= Open Fist Theatre Company =

The Open Fist Theatre is both a 501(c)(3) non-profit theatre company. Originally operating a 99-seat theatre facility in Theatre Row Hollywood located at 6209 Santa Monica Blvd, it is now in residence at the Atwater Village Theatre. The name of the Open Fist Theatre Company comes from two principles: the notion of an open spirit and the fist—a sign of determination and force.

The OFTC was founded in 1990 by Ziad Hamzeh (Artistic Director), Helena Cullen-hamzeh, Michael Denney (Actor/Playwright/Teacher), Tim Pulice (Actor), Brian Muir (Actor) and Kathleen Dunn (Actor/Teacher), all of whom were graduates of the Theater Program of California State University, Fullerton. As of January 2020, Martha Demson has been the company's artistic director for 20 years, taking on the role in 2000. Originally the company was based at 1625 North La Brea in a rehearsal hall once owned by Bob Hope. In 2005 this facility was destroyed to accommodate Hollywood redevelopment and the company moved to 6209 Santa Monica Boulevard, a facility originally operated by the Actors Gang. The Open Fist is notable for its support of both new works and new interpretations of theatre classics in productions typically featuring contemporary production values, ensemble acting, and imaginative direction and design.

It has been the site of numerous premiere productions of then-new plays, including Frank Zappa's rock opera Joe's Garage, The Room by Michael Franco, Love Water by Jacqueline Wright, Neil LaBute's The New Testament, and Julie Hébert's St. Joan and the Dancing Sickness.

A yearly summer Director's Festival or First Look Festival also features membership-driven new work. The Open Fist has been nominated and received numerous LA Weekly, Ovation, Garland and other awards.

== Production history ==
=== 1990 ===
- True West by Sam Shepard

=== 1991 ===
- Car Cemetery by Fernando Arrabal
- Child of God by Michael Denney
- Cloud Nine by Caryl Churchill
- Exit the King by Eugène Ionesco
- Professor George by Marsha Sheiness

=== 1992 ===
- Baal by Bertolt Brecht
- Dusa, Fish, Stas, and Vi by Pam Gems
- Goose and Tomtom by David Rabe
- Poor Murderer by Pavel Kahout
- The Bitter Tears of Petra von Kant by Rainer Werner Fassbinder
- Tiny Alice by Edward Albee

=== 1993 ===
- Blood Moon by Nicholas Kazan
- Cinders by Janusz Glowacki
- Ms. Julie by August Strindberg
- The Architect and the Emperor of Assyria by Fernando Arrabal
- The Last Word by Tony Spiridakis
- After the Bomb by Roxy Ventola

=== 1994 ===
- The Little Prince by Antoine de Saint-Exupéry
- The Night Angel by William Piana
- Vieux Carre by Tennessee Williams
- Hush by April De Angelis

=== 1995 ===
- Etta Jenks by Marlene Meyer
- The Flight of the Earls by Christopher Humble
- Behemoth by Della Vecchia Smith
- The Moke Eater by Ken Bernard
- Blood and Stumbo; Falling by Beth Burns
- Underground by Mark Litton
- The Ghost Diaries by Keith Mason

=== 1996 ===
- A Warring Absence by Jody Duncan
- Time Piece; Guernica by D. O'Brian, Neal Bell
- Fear and Misery of the Third Reich by Bertolt Brecht
- The God Game by Allison Burnett
- Journey of the Fifth Horse by Ronald Ribman
- New York 243 by J.D. Zeik

=== 1997 ===
- Salam, Shalom by Saleem
- The Servant of Two Masters by Carlo Goldoni
- Titanic by Christopher Durang
- The Vakhos by Euripides
- Tabooki (Serial) by Various Authors
- After Easter by Anne Devlin
- Buddy Jack Adapted by Ron West, Joe Liss

=== 1998 ===
- Getting Into My Skin by Saleem
- Time Lost by Jack O'Rourke
- God’s Country by Steven Dietz
- Sex, Death and Other Annoyances by Ron West
- The Accompanist by Berberovna/Adapt. Giurgea
- Skin by Naomi Iizuka
- We Won’t Pay! We Won’t Pay! by Dario Fo
- Fall ’98 One-Act Festival by Various Authors
- The Notcracker Project (with Circle-X Theatre Company) by Various Authors

=== 1999 ===
- Fall Off Night by Allison Gregory
- Widows by Ariel Dorfman & Tony Kushner
- Slippery People by Charley McQuary
- The Life of Galileo by Bertolt Brecht
- Escape From Happiness by George F. Walker

=== 2000 ===
- The Abdication by Ruth Wolff
- Cowboy Mouth; Lobster Man by Sam Shepard, Martin George
- How to Explain the History of Communism to Mental Patients by Matei Visniec
- Talk Show From Hell by Jean-Noël Fenwick
- The King Stag by Carlo Gozzi
- 2000 Directors Festival by Various Authors
- Measure 4 Measure by William Shakespeare
- Three Sisters by Anton Chekov
- Bay of Smokes by Alena Wilson and Alisa Wilson

=== 2001 ===
- The Knacker’s ABC by Boris Vian
- The Wooden Breeks by Glen Berger
- Casanova by Constance Congdon
- 2001 Directors Festival by Various Authors
- Fen by Caryl Churchill
- Sharon and Billy by Alan Bowne
- The Freedom Ball by Chelsea Hackett
- Exmass by Bradley Rand Smith, Lewis Black & Mark Houghtaling

=== 2002 ===
- Perchance To Dream by Jean-Claude Grumberg
- Adult Entertainment, Problem Child by George F. Walker
- Flight by Mikhail Bulgakov
- 2002 Directors Festival by Various Authors
- The Mound Builders by Lanford Wilson
- The Andrea and Hep Show by Andrea Fears, Hep Jamieson and Ron West
- I Licked A Slag's Deodorant by Jim Cartwright

=== 2003 ===
- Songs of Joy and Destitution by Charles L. Mee Jr.
- As I Lay Dying by William Faulkner, adapted by Edward Kemp
- Playhouse Creatures by April De Angelis
- 2003 Directors’ Festival by Various Authors
- The Andrea and Hep Show 2: More Faster More Furiouser by Andrea Fears, Hep Jamieson and Ron West
- The Cosmonaut’s Last Message to The Woman He Once Loved In The Former Soviet Union by David Greig

=== 2004 ===
- Abingdon Square by Maria Irene Fornes
- The Devils by Dostoevsky, adapted by Elizabeth Egloff
- Roberto Zucco by Bernard-Marie Koltès
- Birdbath by Leonard Melfi
- 2004 Directors’ Festival by Various Authors
- Lydie Breeze by John Guare
- The Andrea and Hep Show 3 by Andrea Fears, Hep Jamieson and Ron West

=== 2005 ===
- The Chekhov Machine by Matei Visniec
- Papa by John DeGroot
- General Admissions by Mark Banker
- The Threepenny Opera by Bertolt Brecht
- Speaking in Tongues by Steven Bovell

=== 2006 ===
- Papa (Revival) by John DeGroot
- 2006 Directors’ Festival by Various Authors
- The Time of Your Life by William Saroyan
- How to Explain the History of Communism to Mental Patients by Matei Visniec
- Autobahn by Neil LaBute
- Beautiful City by George Walker

=== 2007 ===
- Macbeth by William Shakespeare
- Travesties by Tom Stoppard
- The Idiot Box by Michael Elyanow
- Do Do Love by Laura Richardson
- The Room by Michael Franco
- Eenie Meanie by Teresa Willis
- Seven Santas by Jeff Goode

=== 2008 ===
- The Dead by James Joyce
- Blue Night in the Heart of the West by James Stock
- Comedy of Errors by William Shakespeare
- deLEARious by Ron West
- Frank Zappa’s Joe's Garage Adaptation by Michael Franco and Pat Towne

=== 2009 ===
- Light Up The Sky by Moss Hart
- Devil With Boobs by Dario Fo
- Love Water by Jacqueline Wright
- First Look Festival by Various Authors

== Awards and nominations ==
Awards	Production	Nominations	Wins	Notes
2007 Ovation Awards	Travesties	1	0	
2008 Ovation Awards	deLEARious	2	0	
2009 Ovation Awards	Joe's Garage	4	0	
2009 Ovation Awards	Light Up The Sky	1	0	

== Current and past affiliated artists ==
- Ziad Hamzeh
- Matthew Fox
