= 2007 Ovation Awards =

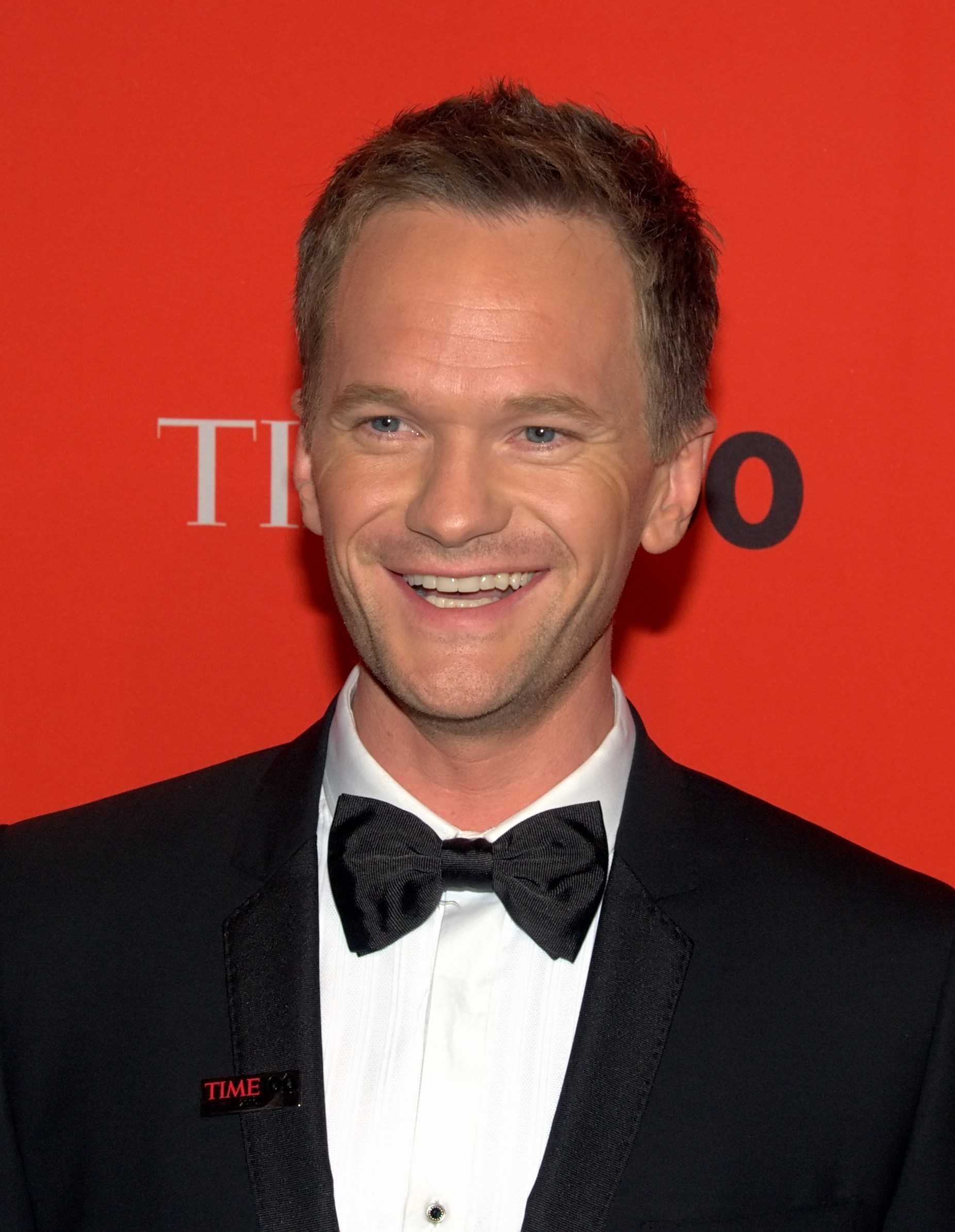
Neil Patrick Harris, ceremony host

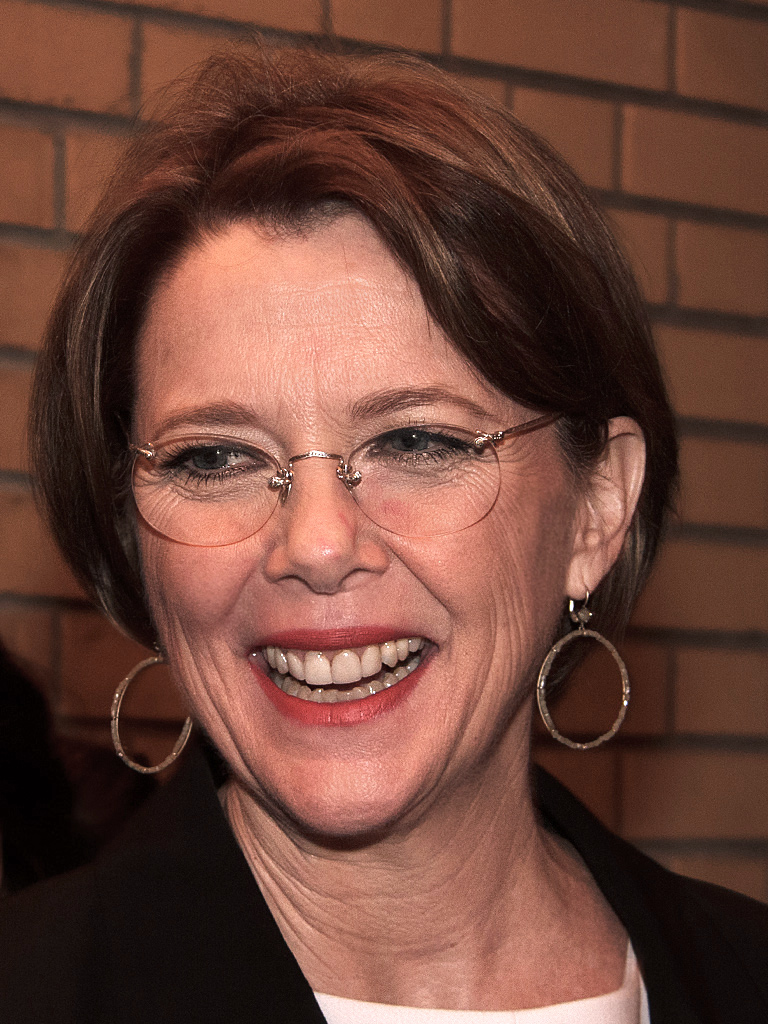
Annette Bening, winner, Career Achievement

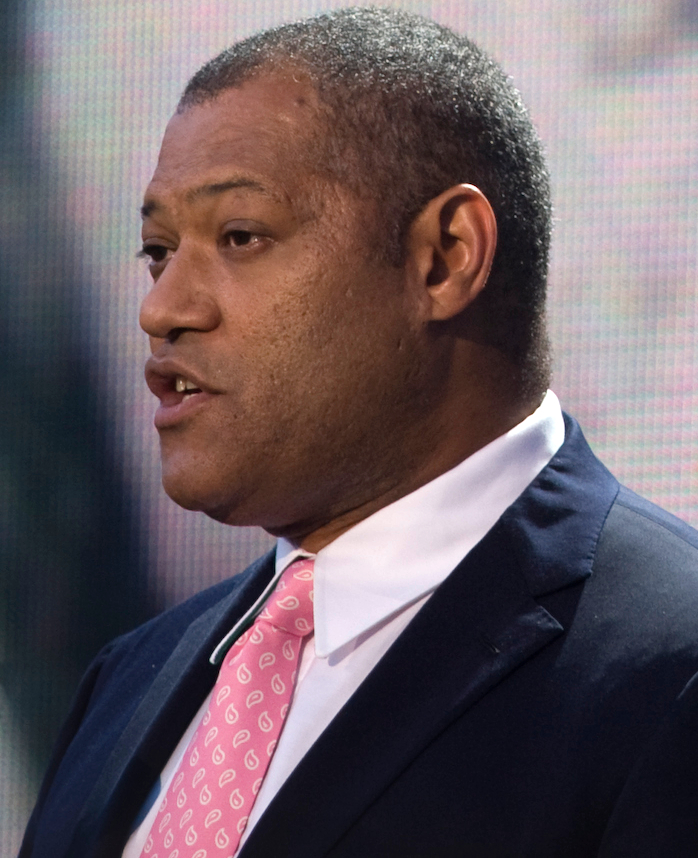
Laurence Fishburne, nominee, Lead Actor in a Play

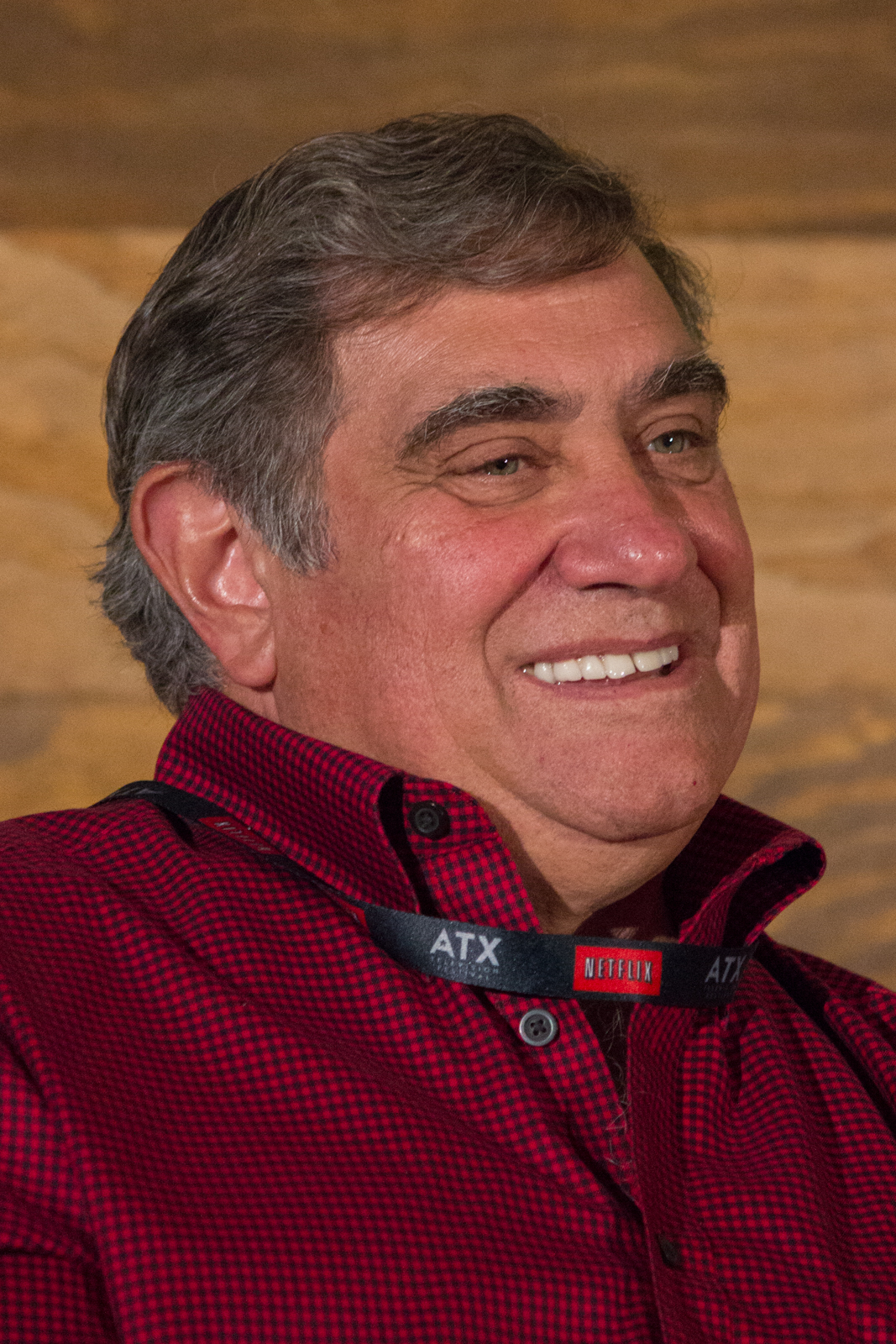
Dan Lauria, nominee, Lead Actor in a Play

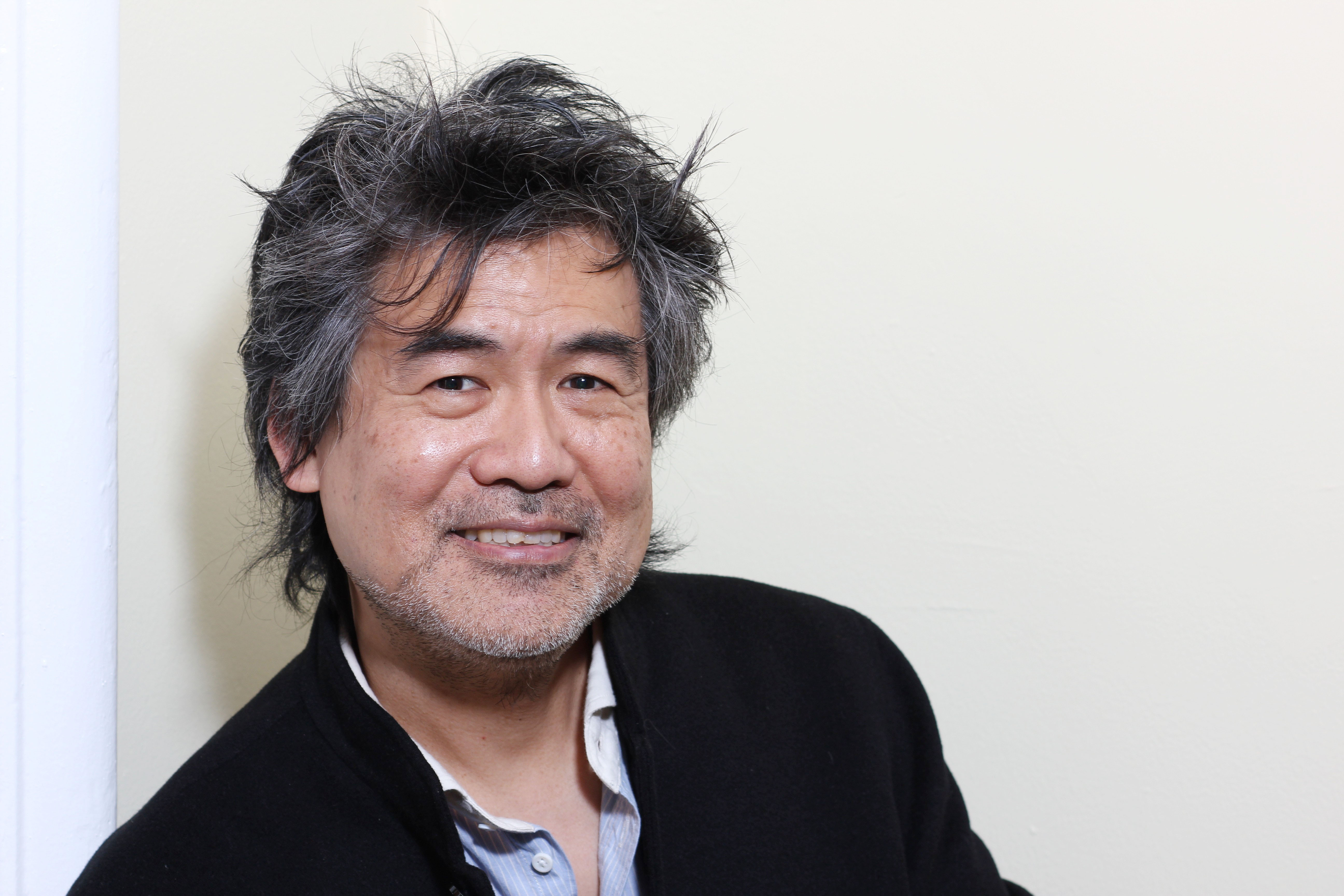
David Henry Hwang, nominee, Playwrighting For An Original Play

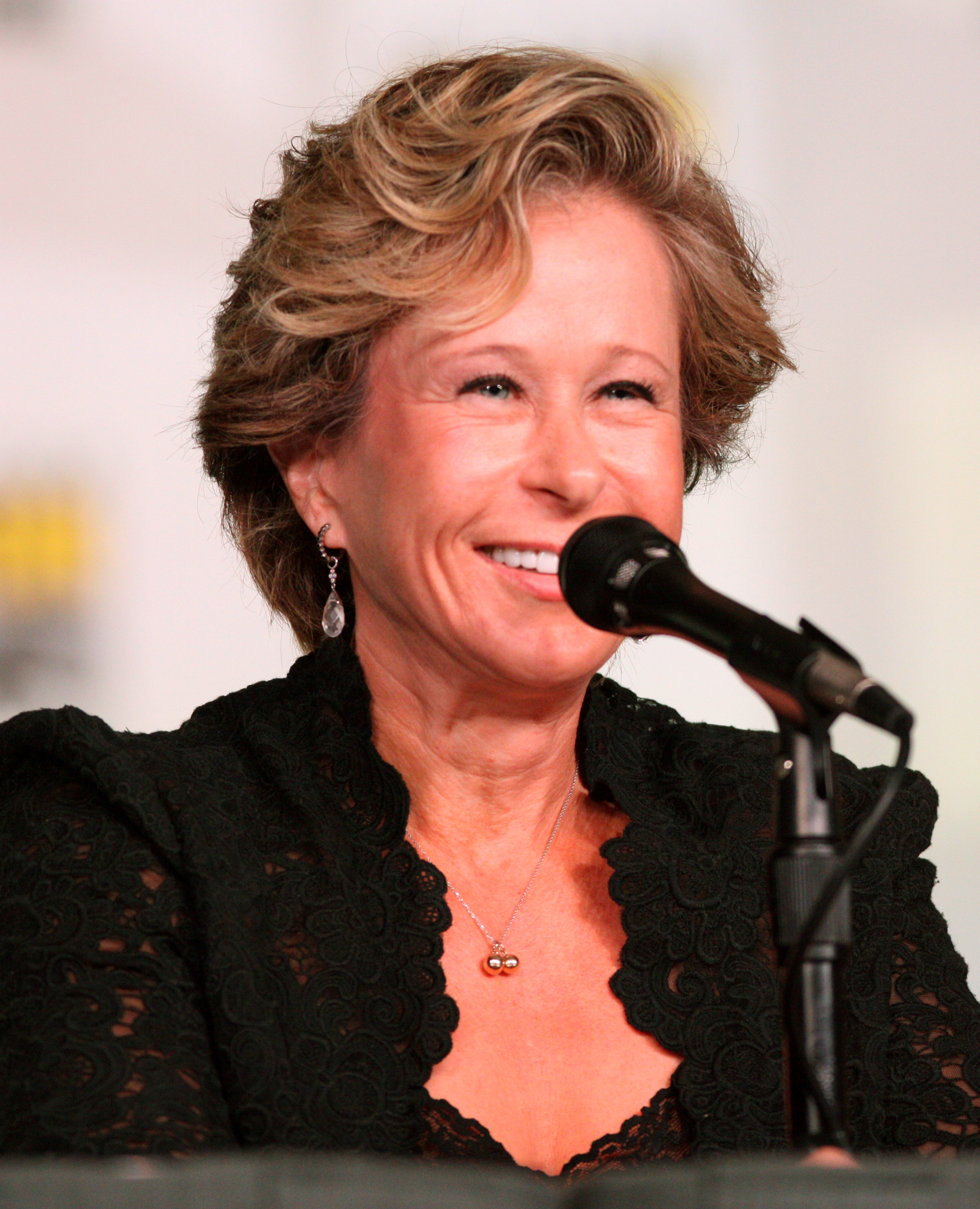
Yeardley Smith, nominee, Lead Actress in a Play

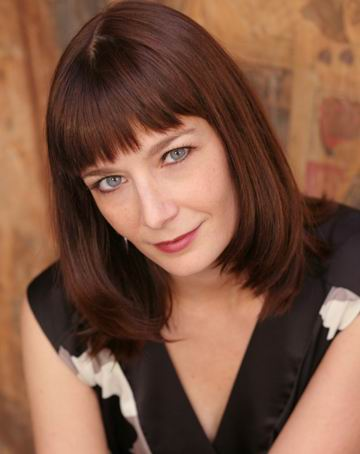
Erika Amato, nominee, Featured Actress in a Musical

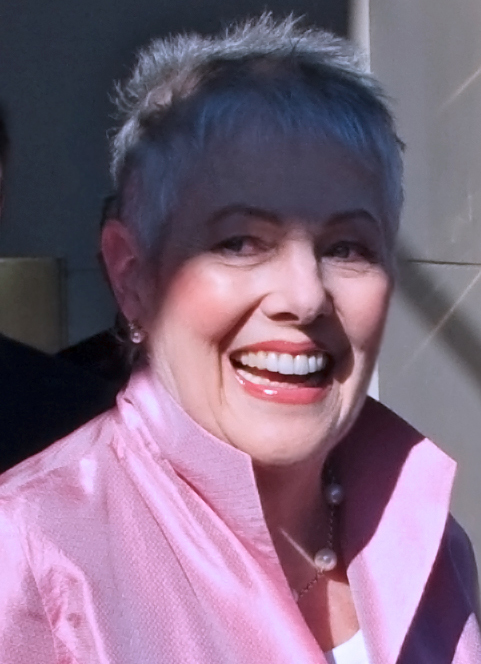
Lynn Redgrave, nominee, Solo Performance

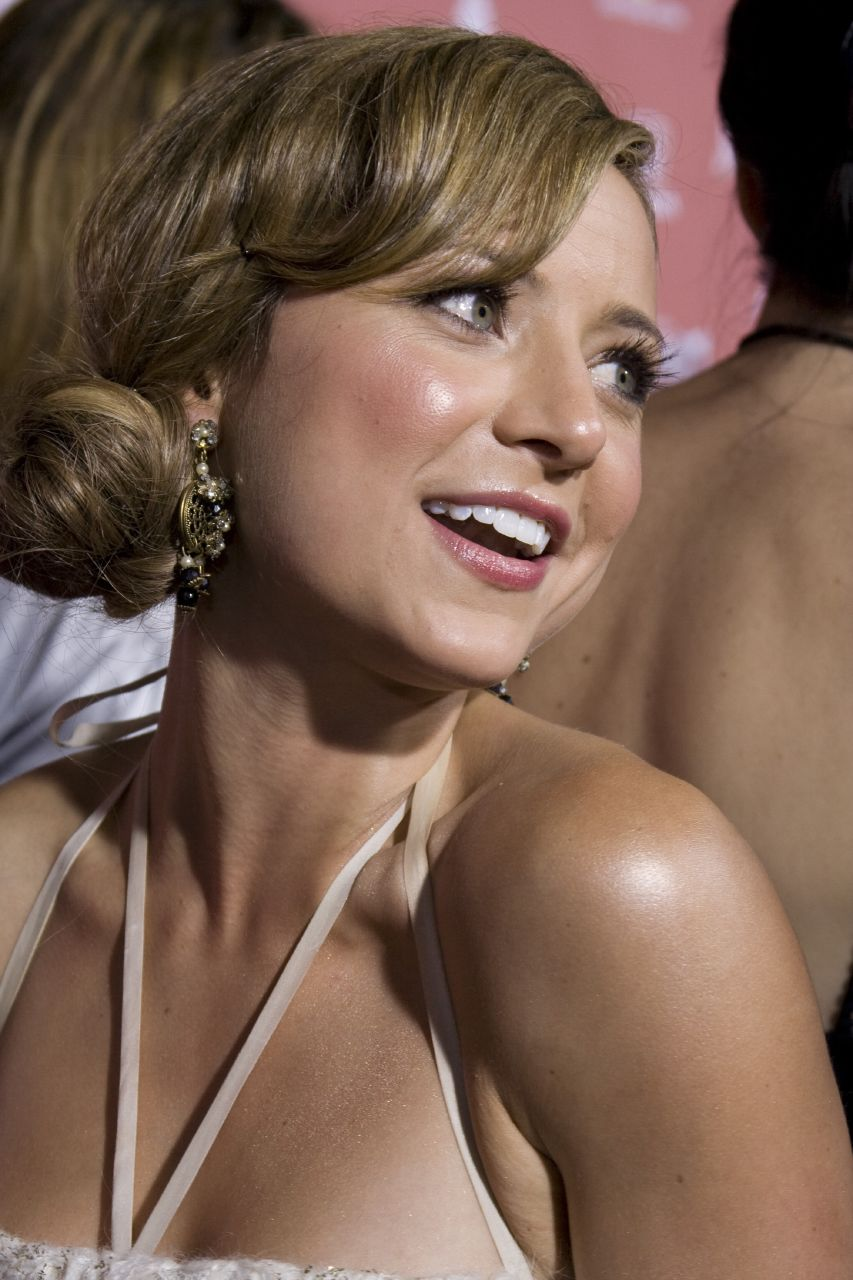
Christine Lakin, nominee, Choreography

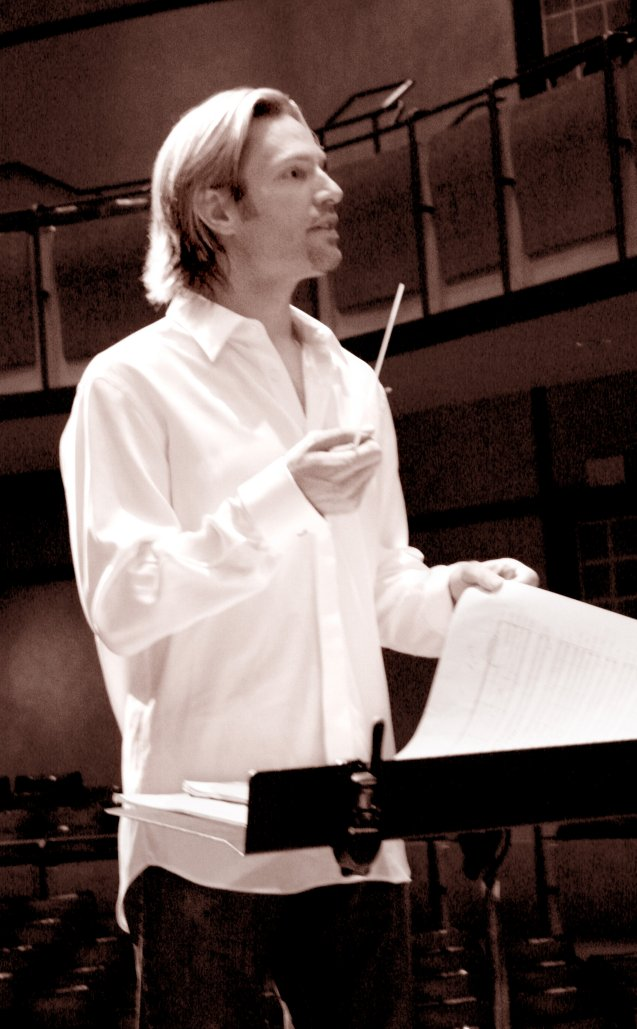
Eric Whitacre, nominee, Book/Lyrics/Music for an Original Musical

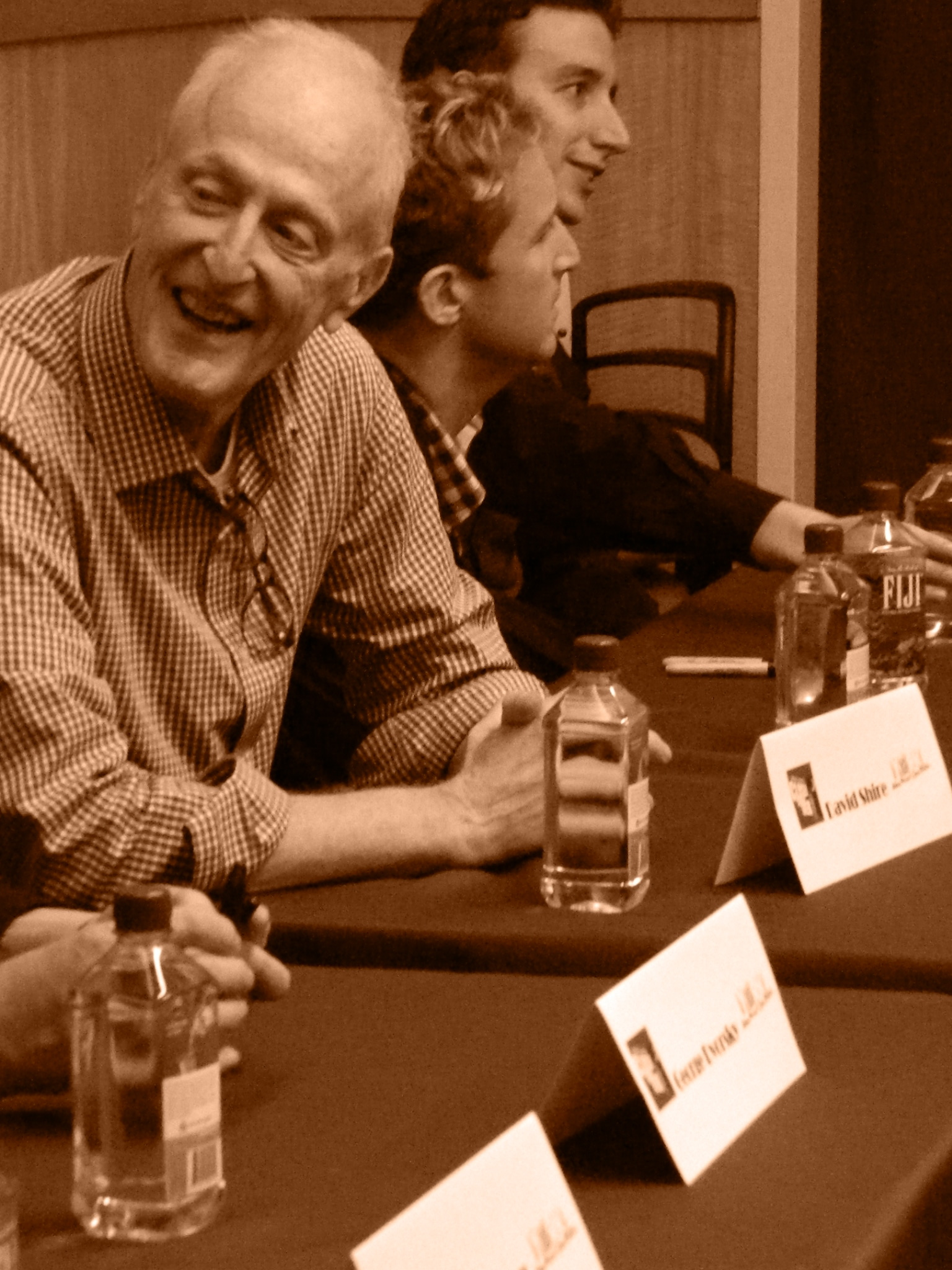
David Shire, nominee, Book/Lyrics/Music for an Original Musical

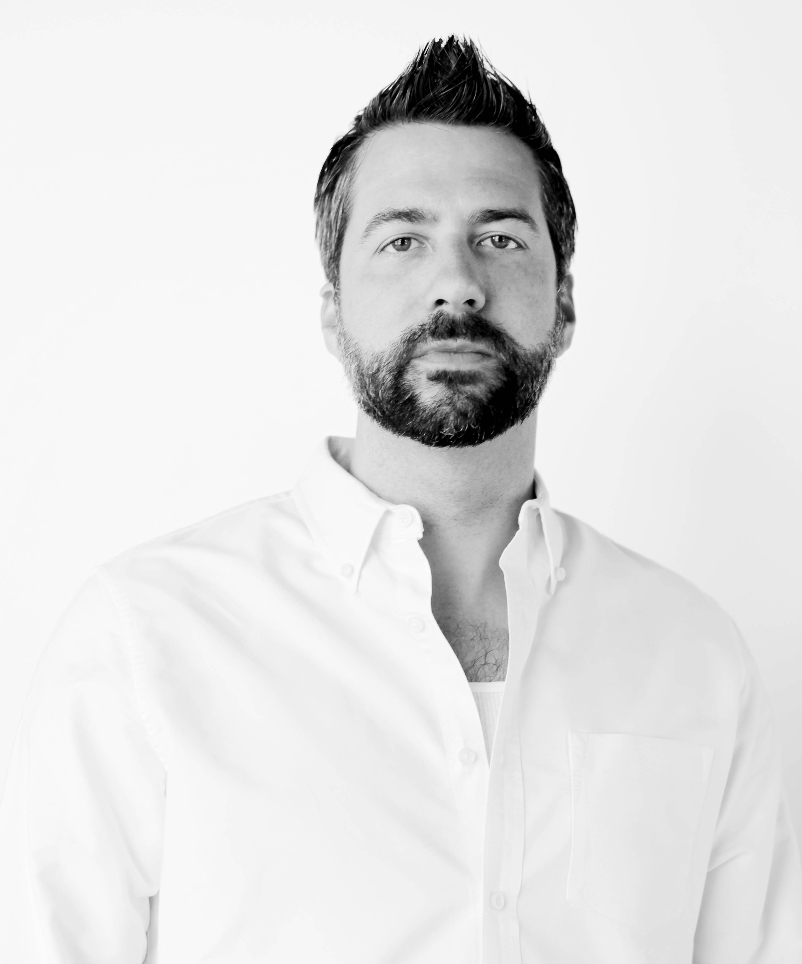
Brian Sidney Bembridge, nominee, Lighting Design (Intimate Theater)

The nominees for the 2007 Ovation Awards were announced on September 24, 2007. The awards were presented for excellence in stage productions in the Los Angeles area from September 1, 2006 to August 31, 2007 based upon evaluations from members of the Los Angeles theater community.

The winners were announced on November 12, 2007 in a ceremony hosted by Neil Patrick Harris at the Orpheum Theatre in downtown Los Angeles, California.

== Board of Governors Awards ==
The Los Angeles Stage Alliance presented three non-competitive awards for meritorious service to theater in Los Angeles. The Board of Governors Award for Career Achievement was given to Annette Bening. The James A. Doolittle Leadership in Theatre Award was given to the Community Redevelopment Agency of the City of Los Angeles. And The Actors Fund was honored with the Community Outreach Award.

== Awards ==
Winners are listed first and highlighted in boldface.

Best Production of a Musical (Intimate Theater)	Best Production of a Musical (Large Theater)
**The Marvelous Wonderettes – Marvelous Dreams, LLC**; The Beastly Bombing – The Secret Order of Revolutionary Operettists; Paradise Lost: Shadows and Wings – The Theatre @ Boston Court; Urinetown: The Musical – Interact Theatre Company; Zanna, Don't! – West Coast Ensemble	**George Gershwin Alone – Geffen Playhouse**; Can-Can – Pasadena Playhouse; Monsieur Chopin – Geffen Playhouse; Plaid Tidings – La Mirada Theatre for the Performing Arts; Sleeping Beauty Wakes – Center Theatre Group: Kirk Douglas Theatre
Best Production of a Play (Intimate Theater)	Best Production of a Play (Large Theater)
**Jitney – Stagewalker Productions**; The Bacchae – Celebration Theatre; Bad Hurt On Cedar Street – Greenway Arts Alliance; Beautiful Thing – Celebration Theatre; The Long Christmas Ride Home – Theatre Tribe; Safety – Closet Space Theatre; Tryst – Black Dahlia Theatre	**Souvenir – Richmark Entertainment**; As You Like It – A Noise Within; Greater Tuna – La Mirada Theatre for the Performing Arts; Trying – The Colony Theatre Company; The Value of Names – Falcon Theatre
Best Touring Production	Acting Ensemble
**Jersey Boys – Center Theatre Group: Ahmanson Theatre**; Doubt – Center Theatre Group: Ahmanson Theatre; In The Continuum – Center Theatre Group: Kirk Douglas Theatre; Twelve Angry Men – Center Theatre Group: Ahmanson Theatre; Who's Afraid Of Virginia Woolf? – Center Theatre Group: Ahmanson Theatre	**The cast of Jitney – Stagewalker Productions**; The cast of Because They Have No Words – Weirdsmobile Productions LLC; The cast of Beehive, The 60's Musical – Valley Musical Theatre; The cast of The Long Christmas Ride Home – Theatre Tribe; The cast of The Marvelous Wonderettes – Marvelous Dreams, LLC; The cast of Plaid Tidings – La Mirada Theatre for the Performing Arts; The cast of Small Tragedy – Odyssey Theatre Ensemble
Solo Performance	
**Dael Orlandersmith – The Gimmick – Fountain Theatre, Simon Levy**; Keo Woolford – I Land – East West Players; Lynn Redgrave – Nightingale – Center Theatre Group: Mark Taper Forum; Jodi Long – Surfing DNA – East West Players; Fritz Coleman – Tonight at 11! – Falcon Theatre	
Lead Actor in a Musical	Lead Actress in a Musical
**Hershey Felder – George Gershwin Alone – Geffen Playhouse**; Kevin Bailey – Annie Get Your Gun – Civic Light Opera of South Bay Cities; Kevin Earley – Can-Can – Pasadena Playhouse; Hershey Felder – Monsieur Chopin – Geffen Playhouse; Jeffry Denman – On Your Toes – Reprise! Broadway's Best	**Michelle Duffy** – Can-Can – Pasadena Playhouse; Misty Cotton – Duke Ellington's Sophisticated Ladies – Civic Light Opera of South Bay Cities; Hila Plitmann – Paradise Lost: Shadows and Wings – The Theatre @ Boston Court; Valerie Vigoda – Sleeping Beauty Wakes – Center Theatre Group: Kirk Douglas Theatre; Alexandria Wailes – Sleeping Beauty Wakes – Center Theatre Group: Kirk Douglas Theatre
Lead Actor in a Play	Lead Actress in a Play
**Alan Mandell – Trying – The Colony Theatre Company**; Eddie Jones – Death of a Salesman – Miss O Productions, Coleen Kolbacher; Laurence Fishburne – Fences – Pasadena Playhouse; Joe Sears – Greater Tuna – La Mirada Theatre for the Performing Arts; Jaston Williams – Greater Tuna – La Mirada Theatre for the Performing Arts; Tim Sullens – Taking Care – The Victory Theatre Center; Dan Lauria – The Value of Names – Falcon Theatre	**Judy Kaye – Souvenir – Richmark Entertainment**; Yeardley Smith – Balancing Act – Falcon Theatre; Anne Gee Byrd – The Bay at Nice – Andak Stage Company; Anne Gee Byrd – Death of a Salesman – Miss O Productions; Anna Khaja – Palace of the End – 49th Parallel Theatre; Rebecca Mozo – Trying – The Colony Theatre Company; Deborah Puette – Tryst – Black Dahlia Theatre
Featured Actor in a Musical	Featured Actress in a Musical
**David Engel – Can-Can – Pasadena Playhouse**; Amir Talai – Can-Can – Pasadena Playhouse; Kevin McMahon – The Full Monty – Musical Theatre West; John Massey – The Full Monty – Musical Theatre West; Randal Keith – Man of La Mancha – Rubicon Theatre Company; Norman Large – The Pirates of Penzance – Musical Theatre West; Kevin Earley – Sleeping Beauty Wakes – Center Theatre Group: Kirk Douglas Theatre	**Vicki Lewis – Hotel C'est L'amour – Blank Theatre Company**; Carol Hatchett – Duke Ellington's Sophisticated Ladies – Civic Light Opera of South Bay Cities; Mary Jo Catlett – The Full Monty – Musical Theatre West; Tami Tappan Damiano – The Full Monty – Musical Theatre West; Yvette Tucker – On Your Toes – Reprise! Broadway's Best; Erika Amato – Sleeping Beauty Wakes – Center Theatre Group: Kirk Douglas Theatre; Gina D'Acciaro – Tales of Tinseltown – Actors Co-op
Featured Actor in a Play – 2 winners	Featured Actress in a Play
**Hugo Armstrong – Bleed Rail – The Theatre @ Boston Court**; **Dan Alemshah – The Fat of the Land – The New Theatre**; Laurence Cohen – Bad Hurt on Cedar Street – Greenway Arts Alliance; Richard Tatum – A Doll's House – Ark Theatre Company; Orlando Jones – Fences – Pasadena Playhouse; Wendell Pierce – Fences – Pasadena Playhouse; Matt Foyer – Power - Theatre Banshee	**Judith Moreland – Miss Julie – Fountain Theatre**; Iris Gilad – Bad Hurt on Cedar Street – Greenway Arts Alliance; Lily Holleman – Bleed Rail – The Theatre @ Boston Court; Sharon Johnston – Kimberly Akimbo – The Victory Theatre Center; Peggy Goss – Safety – Closet Space Theatre; Bonnie Bailey-Reed – See Rock City – Actors Co-op; Deborah Strang – A Touch of the Poet – A Noise Within
Director of a Musical	Director of a Play
**David Lee – Can-Can – Pasadena Playhouse**; Joel Zwick – George Gershwin Alone – Geffen Playhouse; Joel Zwick – Monsieur Chopin – Geffen Playhouse; Roger Bean – The Marvelous Wonderettes – Marvelous Dreams, LLC; Michael Michetti – Paradise Lost: Shadows and Wings – The Theatre @ Boston Court; Jeff Calhoun – Sleeping Beauty Wakes – Center Theatre Group: Kirk Douglas Theatre; Nick DeGruccio – Zanna, Don't! – West Coast Ensemble	**Stuart Rogers – The Long Christmas Ride Home – Theatre Tribe**; Michael Matthews – The Bacchae – Celebration Theatre; Michael Matthews – Beautiful Thing – Celebration Theatre; Claude Purdy – Jitney – Stagewalker Productions; Vivian Matalon – Souvenir – Richmark Entertainment; Cameron Watson – Trying – The Colony Theatre Company; Robin Larsen – Tryst – Black Dahlia Theatre
Music Direction – 2 winners	Choreography
**Dan Wheetman – Back Home Again: A John Denver Holiday Concert – Rubicon Theatre Company**; **Brendan Milburn – Sleeping Beauty Wakes – Center Theatre Group: Kirk Douglas Theatre**; Steve Orich – Can-Can – Pasadena Playhouse; Hershey Felder – George Gershwin Alone – Geffen Playhouse; Hershey Felder – Monsieur Chopin – Geffen Playhouse; Gerald Sternbach – On Your Toes – Reprise! Broadway's Best; Greg Chun – Paradise Lost: Shadows and Wings – The Theatre @ Boston Court	**Lee Martino – Beehive, The 60's Musical – Valley Musical Theatre**; Patti Colombo – Can-Can – Pasadena Playhouse; Cheryl Baxter – Duke Ellington's Sophisticated Ladies – Civic Light Opera of South Bay Cities; Lee Martino – On Your Toes – Reprise! Broadway's Best; Bubba Carr & Caleb Terray – Paradise Lost: Shadows and Wings – The Theatre @ Boston Court; Tracy Powell – Urinetown: The Musical – Interact Theatre Company; Christine Lakin & Paul Nygro – Zanna, Don't! – West Coast Ensemble e
Book/Lyrics/Music for an Original Musical	Playwrighting For An Original Play
**Brendan Milburn & Valerie Vigoda (music/lyrics) & Rachel Sheinkin (book) – Sleeping Beauty Wakes – Center Theatre Group: Kirk Douglas Theatre**; Jason Robert Brown (music/lyrics) & Dan Elish (book) – 13 – Center Theatre Group: Mark Taper Forum; Randal Myler & Dan Wheetman – Back Home Again: A John Denver Holiday Concert – Rubicon Theatre Company; Eric Whitacre (music/lyrics/book) & David Noroña (lyrics) – Paradise Lost: Shadows and Wings – The Theatre @ Boston Court; Richard Maltby Jr. (book/lyrics) & Joel Silberman (book) & David Shire (music) – A Time For Love – Rubicon Theatre Company	**Damon Chua – Film Chinois – Grove Theatre Center**; Mark Kemble – Bad Hurt On Cedar Street – Greenway Arts Alliance; Tim Maddock & Lotti Louise Pharriss – Because They Have No Words – Weirdsmobile Productions LLC; W. Colin McKay – Fallujah – Theatre East; Arlene Hutton – Gulf View Drive – Actors Co-op; Justin Tanner – Space Therapy – Zephyr Theatre; David Henry Hwang – Yellow Face – Center Theatre Group: Mark Taper Forum
Costume Design (Intimate Theater)	Costume Design (Large Theater)
**Audrey Fisher – Tryst – Black Dahlia Theatre**; Leonard Ogden – Film Chinois – Grove Theatre Center; Rudy Dillon – Hogan's Goat – Pacific Resident Theatre; Nanci Martin – Jitney – Stagewalker Productions; JoAnna Jocelyn – Les Liaisons Dangeureses – Ark Theatre Company; Soojin Lee – Paradise Lost: Shadows and Wings – The Theatre @ Boston Court; A. Jeffrey Schoenberg – Travesties – Open Fist Theatre Company	**Tracy Christensen – Souvenir – Richmark Entertainment**; Randy Gardell – Can-Can – Pasadena Playhouse; Linda Fisher – Greater Tuna – La Mirada Theatre for the Performing Arts; Marcy Froehlich – Hamlet – Rubicon Theatre Company; Marcy Froehlich – Man of La Mancha – Rubicon Theatre Company; Bob Mackie & Joe McFate – No Strings – Reprise! Broadway's Best; A. Jeffrey Schoenberg – Trying – The Colony Theatre Company
Lighting Design (Intimate Theater)	Lighting Design (Large Theater)
**Steven Young – Paradise Lost: Shadows and Wings – The Theatre @ Boston Court**; Tim Swiss – The Bacchae – Celebration Theatre; Brian Sidney Bembridge – Eurydice – Circle X Theatre; Jeremy Pivnick – Gilgamesh – The Theatre @ Boston Court; Joel Daavid – Jitney – Stagewalker Productions; Luke Moyer – The Long Christmas Ride Home – Theatre Tribe; Christopher Kuhl – Monster of Happiness – 24th St. Theatre	**Michael Gilliam – George Gershwin Alone – Geffen Playhouse**; Michael Gilliam – Can-Can – Pasadena Playhouse; Richard Norwood – Monsieur Chopin – Geffen Playhouse; Jeremy Pivnick – Man of La Mancha – Rubicon Theatre Company; Michael Gilliam – Sleeping Beauty Wakes – Center Theatre Group: Kirk Douglas Theatre; Jason H. Thompson – Sunday in the Park with George – Reprise! Broadway's Best; Jared Sayeg – Trying – The Colony Theatre Company
Set Design (Intimate Theater)	Set Design (Large Theater) – 2 winners
**Tom Buderwitz – Paradise Lost: Shadows and Wings – The Theatre @ Boston Court**; Two Blue Chairs – 1 to 10? – The Theatre District; Brian Sidney Bembridge – Eurydice – Circle X Theatre; Leonard Ogden – Film Chinois – Grove Theatre Center; Joel Daavid – Jitney – Stagewalker Productions; Travis Gale Lewis – Miss Julie – Fountain Theatre; Craig Siebels – Tryst – Black Dahlia Theatre	**Roy Christopher – Can-Can – Pasadena Playhouse**; **Keith Mitchell – The Value of Names – Falcon Theatre**; Thomas S. Giamario – The Diary of Anne Frank – Rubicon Theatre Company; Yael Pardess – George Gershwin Alone – Geffen Playhouse; Thomas S. Giamario – Man of La Mancha – Rubicon Theatre Company; Francois-Pierre Couture – A Picasso – Geffen Playhouse; Victoria Profitt – Trying – The Colony Theatre Company
Sound Design (Intimate Theater)	Sound Design (Large Theater)
**Martin Carillo – Paradise Lost: Shadows and Wings – The Theatre @ Boston Court**; Cricket Myers – The Bacchae – Celebration Theatre; John Zalewski – Bleed Rail – The Theatre @ Boston Court; Robbin E. Broad – Eurydice – Circle X Theatre; John Zalewski – Melancholia – Latino Theater Company; Richard Alger & Tina Kronis – Monster of Happiness – 24th St. Theatre; John Zalewski – No Mercy – 24th St. Theatre	**Jon Gottlieb – George Gershwin Alone – Geffen Playhouse**; Francois Bergeron – Can-Can – Pasadena Playhouse; Ken Huncovsky – Greater Tuna – La Mirada Theatre for the Performing Arts; Eric Snodgrass – Sleeping Beauty Wakes – Center Theatre Group: Kirk Douglas Theatre; David Budries – Souvenir – Richmark Entertainment; John Zalewski – The Thousandth Night – The Colony Theatre Company; Cricket Myers – Trying – The Colony Theatre Company
