= We Are the Tigers =

Musical by Preston Max Allen

- Off-Broadway Playbill
- Music: Preston Max Allen
- Lyrics: Preston Max Allen
- Book: Preston Max Allen
- Premiere: October 2, 2015: Hudson Backstage Theatre, Los Angeles
- Productions: 2015 Los Angeles; 2019 Off-Broadway
- Awards: Ovation Award for Lyrics/Composition for an Original Musical

We Are the Tigers is a pop rock musical with book, lyrics, and music by Preston Max Allen. The musical follows a cheerleading captain and her team trying to survive the annual cheer sleepover when a serial killer strikes.

The show premiered in Los Angeles at the Hudson Backstage Theatre in 2015, and an Off-Broadway production played from February to April 2019. A cast album was released on April 26, 2019.

== Synopsis ==
=== Act I ===
As Riley and her best friend Cairo prepare for the annual cheerleading sleepover in the basement of Riley's home, Riley expresses her desire to prove herself as the new captain of the Giles Corey High cheerleading squad, while lamenting the team's "loser" status. Meanwhile, the other team members arrive, with varying levels of enthusiasm, as Cairo tries to get Riley to relax ("Worst Team Ever"). The meeting is delayed until Annleigh arrives late, with her step-sister Farrah, who is clearly drunk, in tow. While Riley attempts to lead them all in an introduction exercise, each team member expresses their inner concerns and worries, but ultimately states that they don't care ("Don't Even"). Cairo suggests a game of truth or dare and makes Mattie, the freshman on the team, drink the contents of Farrah's bottle. Riley tries to get them back on track by practicing a cheer, but Farrah refuses to participate if Chess is part of the team. Farrah berates Chess for being stoned and dropping her during a cheer, which was the reason the team went viral the previous year. Kate rises to her defense, stating that Farrah is drunk, and the argument escalates until Riley insists Kate take a walk and calm down.

Chess follows her friend outside and Kate confesses her fears over Chess moving away to college, since Kate is a junior while Chess is a senior ("Skype Tomorrow"). When Kate asks Chess to come back inside with her, Chess tries to stay outside and they argue until Kate finds Chess's bottle of pain medication and leaves, furious. At the same time, Farrah tries to get Annleigh to stop texting Clark, who is Annleigh's boyfriend, and pay attention to her, accidentally breaking her phone in the process. Annleigh tells Farrah that they will never be sisters and leaves, furious. Chess and Farrah divulge their concerns over their lives and their vices while the other girls describe the struggles of being teenage girls ("Before the Breakdown"). Alone, Chess hears strange noises and is murdered by an unseen person.

Back in the kitchen, Annleigh is surprised by Clark, who has snuck into the sleepover to see her. The couple share their desires with each other and confirm their commitment to each other and their chastity, with Clark proposing to Annleigh ("Forever"). Before Annleigh can respond, Cairo comes to retrieve her and Clark hides in the pantry. The doorbell rings and Cairo and Annleigh introduce themselves to the pizza delivery girl, Eva Sanchez, who they recognize as the star cheerleader of West High's team, who are the Tigers' rivals. In the living room, Reese is ignored by the other girls because she is just the mascot and she reveals her dreams to be popular and liked, the way Riley and the others are, as well as her desire to be on the team ("Captain of the Team"). When Kate returns without Chess, Reese volunteers to take her place in the routine, but the other members pressure Riley to say no. Instead, Reese is sent to find Chess and Farrah. Mattie stumbles to the bathroom, drunk from the earlier dare. In the other bathroom, Reese finds Farrah throwing up from the alcohol she has consumed. Reese and Farrah have an honest heart to heart, where Reese, who has long been the victim of bullying due to her weight, asks Farrah to stop calling her "Reeses". Farrah begs Reese not to tell the others that she drank so much. When Reese leaves, Farrah reflects on her life ("Before the Breakdown (Reprise)") and pours the rest of her flask down the toilet. Someone knocks on the door, and Farrah apologizes for being drunk before she is killed in the shower by an unseen person.

Meanwhile, Annleigh checks on a drunk Mattie and Cairo confronts Kate about her feelings for Chess. Mattie comes back into the room, bloody from hitting her head in the bathroom. Cairo follows an upset Riley into the kitchen, where they argue over who has done more for the other. Both believe that they are responsible for the other's success and thus deserve better treatment ("Wallflower"). They hear a scream and run outside to find Kate trying to save a dead Chess. In the bathroom, Reese finds Farrah's body and is surprised by Clark. Startled and afraid, Reese attacks Clark and hits him with the showerhead, believing him to be the person who killed Farrah. Realizing that it was Clark she attacked after turning on the lights, Reese attempts to wake him up, but she panics when she realizes that he died after falling and hitting his head on the toilet. When the other girls come running in after hearing her scream, Reese lets them assume Clark was killed by the same person as Chess and Farrah.

Panicked by the deaths, Riley tries to call the police, but Cairo is worried that they will be blamed for the murders and stops her. Instead, she proposes that they pin the murder on Mattie, a girl who they barely know and who is drunk and covered in blood. The team reluctantly agrees to Cairo's plan and work together to plant a murder weapon. As Mattie staggers in and asks what's happening, the girls pass the knife with blood on it to Riley as they surround Mattie and the lights go out ("Defense").

=== Act II ===
Mattie is in prison. She writes a letter to her parents about how bad her life is now, and how she should never have joined the cheer team ("Mattie's Lament").

The Tigers return to Riley's, with two new promising team members, Reese, and Eva Sanchez. Cairo accuses Riley of avoiding her and for paying for Eva's scholarship to come to their school. The girls once again assemble in the basement, where Riley does her best to convince them that they can still have a great year ("Phoenix"). Kate, who keeps hearing Chess's ghost, is furious at them all for trying to act as if nothing happened. They argue until Kate announces that she is going to call the police and fix what they've done.

Outside, Kate and Annleigh struggle over their feelings for their dead loved ones, with the ghosts of Farrah, Clark, and Chess watching them and asking them to promise not to forget them ("Move On"). Reese follows Kate outside and begs her not to call the police. When Kate asks her why, Reese confesses to accidentally killing Clark. Annleigh overhears and angrily attacks Reese for letting her believe that Clark died after cheating on her with Farrah. As the two begin to fight and Riley, Cairo, and Kate try to separate them, Eva watches the chaos and wrestles with whether or not she should stay on the team; on one hand, being on the Tigers means that she is at a better school and can receive a better education, but the team members are clearly unstable ("Shut Up and Cheer").

Dismayed over the fighting, Riley goes inside to get Annleigh and Reese some ice and tells everyone that they can leave. Cairo follows her, insisting that Riley stop them from leaving. Cairo believes they need to maintain the lie in order to stay out of trouble and they argue over what to do next. Riley leaves, and Cairo struggles over Riley's decision not to listen to her ("Wallflower (Reprise)"). Back in the basement, Riley finds that the door is locked and the Wi-Fi is down. While Riley searches for a key, she asks them to talk out their issues. Cairo, Kate, Annleigh, and Reese argue over which one of them could have been the murderer ("IDK").

Annoyed, Riley tries to get them to just practice cheering. When the team refuses, Riley becomes increasingly agitated and breaks down as the rest of the girls watch. Cairo realizes that Riley has the key and Kate and Reese attempt to reassure her, but an erratic Riley confesses to the murders ("The Breakdown"). After a struggle, Reese knocks Riley out and Cairo helps to tie her up. Annleigh is sent to call the police while Eva helps Kate, whom Riley stabbed in the thigh. Riley tells them that no one will believe them if they turn her in, but Eva reveals she recorded Riley's whole confession on her phone. Riley begs Cairo to untie her as police sirens wail.

Later, in the gym, the remaining Tigers return to practice. Kate and Annleigh reveal that they are coping with the deaths of their loved ones ("Move On (Reprise)"). Mattie is back from Juvie, Cairo is the new cheer captain, Annleigh has met a new guy in grief counseling, and Kate is dating Eva. Eva reminds them all that they have community service for being accessories to the crime. Reese starts to show them all the new cheer and they all, including the ghosts of Farrah, Chess, and Clark, as well as Riley, who is in prison, reflect on moving on and healing with the support of each other ("Finale").

== Musical numbers ==
Act I

- "Worst Team Ever" – Riley and Company
- "Don't Even" – Company
- "Skype Tomorrow" – Kate and Chess
- "Before the Breakdown" – Farrah, Chess, and Company
- "Forever" – Annleigh and Clark
- "Captain of the Team" – Reese, Riley, Mattie, Cairo, and Annleigh
- "Before the Breakdown (Reprise)" – Farrah
- "Wallflower" – Riley and Cairo
- "Defense" – Cairo and Company

Act II

- "Mattie's Lament" – Mattie
- "Phoenix" – Riley and Company
- "Move On" – Kate, Annleigh, Clark, Farrah, and Chess
- "Shut Up and Cheer" – Eva Sanchez
- "Wallflower (Reprise)" – Cairo ^{†}
- "IDK" – Cairo, Kate, Reese, Annleigh, and Eva
- "The Breakdown" – Riley, Cairo, Kate, Annleigh, Reese, and Eva
- "Move On (Reprise)" – Kate, Annleigh, and Mattie ^{†}
- "Finale" – Company

† Song is not featured on Cast Album.

Additionally, the spoken track "Time-Out" is featured on the cast album before "IDK" and is performed out-of-character by Zoe Jensen, who played Farrah. The track acts as a spoiler buffer, alerting the listener that the murderer's identity is about to be revealed.

== Cast ==
| Character | 2015 Los Angeles | Off-Broadway |
|---|---|---|
| Riley | Callandra Olivia | Lauren Zakrin |
| Cairo | Jade Johnson | Wonu Ogunfowora |
| Kate | Cailan Rose | Jenny Rose Baker |
| Reese | Gabi Hankins | MiMi Scardulla |
| Annleigh | Rachel King | Kaitlyn Frank |
| Mattie Wheeler | Charlotte Mary Wen | Cathy Ang |
| Chess | Cait Fairbanks | Celeste Rose |
| Farrah | Talisa Friedman | Zoe Jensen |
| Eva Sanchez | Ari Afsar | Sydney Parra |
| Clark | Adam Cropper | Louis Griffin |

== Productions ==
=== Development ===
Writer Preston Max Allen first workshopped the show at Columbia College Chicago in 2013, followed by a self produced workshop at the Gene Frankel Theatre and an industry reading on April 28–29, 2014, which was held by Over The Moon Productions. The restaurant/venue 54 Below hosted We Are The Tigers: In Concert on January 17, 2015. Performers included Janet Krupin, Meghann Fahy and Emily Skeggs. The musical was then the subject of two 'sold-out workshop performances' in August 2015.

In 2016, the musical was featured as one of five shows in the New York's Gallery Players' New Musical Reading Series. Hosted by New York City's Musical Theatre Factory, a concert with songs from the show was performed at Joe's Pub on August 26, 2018. Performers at the concert included Ari Afsar and Remy Zaken.

=== Los Angeles premiere ===
We Are the Tigers: A New Musical opened in Los Angeles at the Hudson Backstage Theatre from October 2, 2015, through November 8, 2015. Michael Bello directed, with choreography by Jacob Brent. The cast featured Callandra Olivia as Riley, Jade Johnson as Cairo, Cailan Rose as Kate, Rachel King as Annleigh, Gabi Hankins as Reese, Talisa Friedman as Farrah, Adam Cropper as Clark, Cait Fairbanks as Chess, Charlotte Mary Wen as Mattie, and Ari Afsar as Eva.

=== Off-Broadway ===
The Off-Broadway production began previews at Theatre 80 St. Marks on February 7, 2019, and ran from February 21, 2019 until April 1, 2019. It was directed by Michael Bello, with choreography by Katherine Roarty and musical arrangements and orchestration by Patrick Sulken. The cast starred Lauren Zakrin as Riley.

A cast album was recorded on March 29, 2019, with an in-store and digital release date of April 26, 2019.

=== Australia ===
An Australian production of We Are The Tigers ran between 9 October to 8 November 2026 at the Hayes Theatre. It was produced by Cheers Productions with Chiara Assetta as Director and Choreographer, Brianna Bishop playing Riley and Olivia Vásquez as Cairo.

== Critical reception ==
=== Los Angeles run ===
The show received mixed reviews in Los Angeles. Editors of The Advocate wrote that the world premiere of We Are The Tigers, "combines elements of mean-girls stories and teen horror movies to come up with a fresh, often hilarious, and sometimes moving tale of trying to survive high school" and Examiner.com gave the musical five stars, saying: "[T]he songs are wonderful and the performers, besides having great voices, have perfect comic timing". Steven Stanley, writing for StageSceneLA, called the show, "a genre-bending, rule-breaking new musical which, while not yet ready for off-Broadway, features engaging characters, catchy songs, and sensational performances that make its World Premiere run at the Hudson Backstage an entertaining Halloween season treat."

However, Deborah Klugman in LA Weekly said, "The talent is certainly there... but it’s hard to gauge its full measure in a thoughtless vehicle like this one", calling it "another painfully sexist, stupid musical". Paul Birchall of Stageraw.com wrote: "There just isn’t that much that is catchy or delightful about Allen's trudge of a musical. The cheerleader-centric storyline consists of a generic collection of mean-girl cliches that were tedious even when this sort of comedy was trending in 1990s."

The production was nominated for three LA Ovation Awards, winning one for Lyrics/Composition for an Original Musical.

=== Off-Broadway run ===
The Off-Broadway production was originally slated to run through April 17 but closed early on April 1. Reviews were mixed.

David Clark wrote in BroadwayWorld that the show "makes you forgive its missteps by being infectiously plucky and actually fun." The New York Times's Elisabeth Vincentelli wrote: "Unfortunately, Preston Max Allen’s meandering show is a textbook example of how to squander a promising concept. There is almost no cheering and not nearly enough slashing; on the other hand, there is an abundance of exposition, often done via samey-sounding tunes that echo each other".

Zachary Stewart of theatermania.com stated: "This cheerleaders-in-a-basement screamfest is not a great musical – nor is it an unpleasant way to spend two hours and change," saying "I laughed during We Are the Tigers, but not nearly as much as I'd hoped to. There's a truly crazy (and crazy-funny) musical lurking in here somewhere, but Allen would have to clear out some of the tall grass he's grown around the show to find it. Still, a musical like this could be a lot worse. The fact that it's not feels like a small triumph." Jeffery Lyal Segal, writing for the Times Square Chronicles, stated: "This little production feels way bigger than it is by virtue of such wall–to-wall production quality. Add in the rock solid, powerfully sung, beautifully acted performances by every member of this tight knit ensemble, and you get a killer evening of musical theater."

The cast album, released on April 26, 2019, received a positive review from Broadwayworld, where Clark wrote: "Each of these talented and capable singers makes these tracks memorable and tunes that your heart will ruminate on for some time ... don't be afraid to get swept away by the bops and beats as long as you're willing to listen to and reflect on these well-crafted stories. There's definitely more here than meets the eye".

== Awards and nominations ==
Original Los Angeles Production
| Year | Awards Ceremony | Category | Nominee | Result |
|---|---|---|---|---|
| 2016 | Ovation Awards | Best Production of a Musical (Intimate Theatre) | | Nominated |
| 2016 | Ovation Awards | Music Direction | Patrick Sulken | Nominated |
| 2016 | Ovation Awards | Lyrics/Composition for an Original Musical | Preston Max Allen | Won |
