= Cricket S. Myers =

American sound designer

Cricket S. Myers is an American sound designer based in Los Angeles, California, United States.

== Early life and education ==
She graduated with a MFA from California Institute of the Arts and has since then worked on over 300 productions around LA. She was nominated for a Tony Award for Best Sound Design in 2011 for Bengal Tiger at the Baghdad Zoo and won best sound at the Drama Desk Award. In 2007, LiveDesign named her a Young Designer to Watch.

== Awards and nominations ==
Awards	Production	Category	Venue/Prod Company	Result	Notes
2007 Ovation Awards	Trying	Best Sound Design (Large Theater)	The Colony Theater	Nominated	
2007 Ovation Awards	The Bacchae	Best Sound Design (Intimate Theater)	The Celebration Theater	Nominated	
2008 Ovation Awards	Dark Play Or Stories For Boys	Best Sound Design (Intimate Theater)	The Theatre @ Boston Court	Nominated	
2008 Ovation Awards	Emergency	Best Sound Design (Large Theater)	Geffen Playhouse	Nominated	
2008 Ovation Awards	Norman's Ark	Best Sound Design (Large Theater)	John Anson Ford Theatre	Nominated	
2008 Ovation Awards	Picasso At The Lapin Agile	Best Sound Design (Large Theater)	Rubicon Theatre Company	Nominated	
2009 Ovation Awards	Battle Hymn	Best Sound Design (Intimate Theater)	Circle X Theatre Company	Nominated	With Michael Levine
2009 Ovation Awards	Mary’s Wedding	Best Sound Design (Large Theater)	Colony Theatre	Nominated	
2009 Ovation Awards	Bengal Tiger at the Baghdad Zoo	Best Sound Design (Large Theater)	Center Theatre Group	Nominated	With Kathryn Bostic
2009 Ovation Awards	The Little Dog Laughed	Best Sound Design (Large Theater)	Center Theatre Group	Nominated	With Lewis Flinn
2010 Ovation Awards	Cousin Bette	Best Sound Design (Intimate Theater)	The Antaeus Company	Nominated	
2010 Ovation Awards	Grace & Glorie	Best Sound Design (Large Theater)	Colony Theatre	Nominated	
2010 Ovation Awards	The Lieutenant of Inishmore	Best Sound Design (Large Theater)	Center Theatre Group	Nominated	
2011 Drama Desk Awards	Bengal Tiger at the Baghdad Zoo	Outstanding Sound Design in a Play	Richard Rodgers Theatre	Won	With Acme Sound Partners
2011 Tony Awards	Bengal Tiger at the Baghdad Zoo	Best Sound Design of a Play	Richard Rodgers Theatre	Nominated	With Acme Sound Partners
2013 Ovation Awards	Bad Apples!	Best Sound Design (Intimate Theater)	Circle X Theatre Company	Nominated	
2013 Ovation Awards	Joe Turner's Come and Gone	Best Sound Design (Large Theater)	Center Theatre Group	Nominated	
2013 Ovation Awards	The Second City's A Christmas Carol: Twist Your Dickens!	Best Sound Design (Large Theater)	Center Theatre Group	Nominated	
2014 Ovation Awards	Play Dead	Best Sound Design (Large Theater)	Geffen Playhouse	Nominated	
2015 Ovation Awards	Bent	Best Sound Design (Large Theater)	Center Theatre Group	Nominated	
2016 Ovation Awards	Endgame	Best Sound Design (Large Theater)	Center Theatre Group	Nominated	
2016 Ovation Awards	I Only Have Eyes for You	Best Sound Design (Large Theater)	Al Dubin Musical/Corky Hale	Nominated	
