= Once Upon a One More Time =

2021 jukebox musical

Once Upon A One More Time
- Playbill of the Broadway production
- Music: Various
- Lyrics: Various
- Book: Jon Hartmere
- Basis: Songs recorded by Britney Spears
- Premiere: November 30, 2021: Sidney Harman Hall, Washington D.C.
- Productions: 2021 Washington, D.C. 2023 Broadway

Once Upon a One More Time is a jukebox musical based on songs popularized by Britney Spears. Set in a fantasy storybook realm, the plot follows numerous fairy-tale characters transformed by a feminist awakening.

Following a 2021 tryout in Washington, D.C., the Broadway production opened at the Marquis Theatre on June 22, 2023 and closed on September 3, 2023.

== Synopsis ==
=== Act I ===
Once Upon a One More Time begins with a little girl, who asks to read a fairytale. Characters from different stories "audition" for their story to be selected, a process guided by the Narrator, but the girl ultimately chooses Cinderella, whose story is acted out on stage ("Baby One More Time"). After the child falls asleep, the fairytale characters can relax before the next scene is to be acted out.

Left alone in the palace between scenes, Cinderella invites Prince Charming to scroll club, a reading group for the princesses to discuss each other's fairytales. Charming rejects her invitation, citing that he does not read, and Cinderella reveals that she feels that something is missing in their fairytales. Rather than listening to her as she requests, he proposes that having a baby will solve her problems ("Make Me"). The two are interrupted by the Narrator, who offers notes before it is time to act out Cinderella's wedding. Questioned if she was late on her entrance, Cinderella reveals to the Narrator she feels lonely despite living her happy ever after. Later, Cinderella arrives to scroll club. Though the other princesses find Little Mermaid's story romantic, Cinderella questions if she should give up her voice and life to save her prince and if that is really happy ever after. The princesses, led by Cinderella, realize they want more than their fairytales' happy ever afters ("Lucky").

Alone in the forest, Cinderella wishes for "more," which summons O.F.G., the original fairy godmother. O.F.G. introduces Cinderella to Betty Friedan's The Feminine Mystique and begins to deconstruct some of the problematic tropes of the fairytale Cinderella lives in. O.F.G. reveals that she has escaped Story's End to Flatbush with Betty Friedan's ideas and encourages Cinderella to read the book but keep it hidden. Called to the work scene, Cinderella reads as her stepsisters demand she clean the palace. As she becomes more empowered, the Stepmother catches Cinderella reading and takes the book ("Work Bitch").

Cinderella reveals to Snow White that she met O.F.G., who gave her a book that has changed the way she views the world. Snow White volunteers to go help get the book back, even though it is dangerous to enter another princess's story, and the two sings a song celebrating their friendship ("Brightest Morning Star").

At the palace, princes and princesses arrive to Prince Charming's ball ("Boys" / "Pretty Girls"). Cinderella and Snow White sneak into the palace, and after the two split up, Cinderella runs into the Stepmother, who proposes that she can have the book back if she rejects the prince and allows one of her daughters to take Cinderella's place. As the Stepmother is about to discuss her daughters with the Narrator, Prince Charming arrives to the palace ("Circus"). Cinderella and Prince Charming have their first dance, and at first, Cinderella begins to reject the Prince but is overcome by his eyes ("Sometimes"). Snow White returns and interrupts, calling Prince Charming her prince, and Cinderella and Snow White realize he has been cheating on both of them. In response, Prince Charming blows them off, and though Cinderella is furious, Snow White is heartbroken ("Oops!...I Did It Again"). Later at scroll club, Snow White sings about her broken heart ("From the Bottom of My Broken Heart"). Cinderella begins to tell the princesses about the book, but the Narrator enters, reprimanding Snow White and Cinderella, who tries to stand up for the two but is shot down with sexist comments.

Back in the forest, Cinderella tells the mice that she doesn't see the point in dreaming anymore, which summons O.F.G., who encourages her to get the book back through being assertive and self-reliant. Cinderella is called to the dress-making scene. Though her stepsisters berate her again, forcing her to do housework, she stands up for herself and gets her book back ("Piece of Me" / "Cinderella").

Cinderella calls all the princesses to Rapunzel's tower to share the book, but at the tower, the princesses run into Prince Charming, who is revealed to be the Prince in everyone's story. The princesses call him out and push him down into a wishing well ("Womanizer"). Cinderella wishes for more books for the princesses, at first summoning Private Parts by Howard Stern because her wish was not specific enough. After wishing for "Princess Betty's books," O.F.G. enters with copies of The Feminine Mystique for everyone, and as they read, they become empowered and ready to go to Flatbush, a place beyond Story's End that they associate with women's freedom ("Scream & Shout" / "I Wanna Go").

=== Act II ===
While the narrator is distraught that the princesses are no longer following their fairytales and seeks to stop them, Cinderella and the princesses are excited for the future ("Crazy"). The Stepmother attempts to indirectly suggest to the Narrator to replace Cinderella with one of her daughters, but he decides to try to remain as true to the fairytale and call Prince Charming. At the palace, Prince Erudite reveals to Prince Charming that just like in Prince Charming's speech, he believes he has found true love -- not a her but a him. Though Prince Charming believes it must be him, Prince Erudite runs to go find his love, leaving Charming alone, away from both Cinderella and Prince Erudite. After the Narrator asks Prince Charming to bring back Cinderella, Prince Charming decides that because she already has both her slippers, the way to bring her back is to learn how to read and create his own scroll club ("3").

The princesses and other fairytale characters leave what is familiar and go on "The Million Princesses March" to Flatbush ("Gimme More"). The group decides to camp for the night and create a list of wishes. Prince Erudite and Clumsy, allies who also joined the march, simultaneously wish for true love, and the princesses help the two get together. Unsure of where they are, Cinderella splits from the group in search of O.F.G. for direction. Alone in the woods, she runs into Prince Charming, who she rejects both verbally and physically ("Cinderella (Reprise)").

The Stepmother attempts yet again to get the Narrator to replace Cinderella with her daughters. Finally, the Narrator agrees. Once the Stepmother gets what she wants, she asks the Narrator to banish all the other fairytale characters to Story's End ("Toxic"). When Snow White will not give up Cinderella's location, he banishes her too. Hungry on power, he banishes the Stepmother's daughters. After the Narrator has left, Cinderella finds the Stepmother alone in shock and learns that the Narrator has banished everyone. Feeling hopeless and alone, Cinderella sings the musical's eleven o'clock number ("Everytime"). At the final line of this song, the little girl enters the stage with a broken fairytale book and begins singing along. Though Cinderella feels that she has broken her fairytale, the girl consoles her and tells her that she loves the new fairytale Cinderella has been leading since departing from her original story. Calling for the little girl, O.F.G. enters, and Cinderella realizes that O.F.G. is the little girl's godmother too. The three decide that they must all return to the palace and figure out if Cinderella lives happy ever after.

Back at the palace, the Narrator offers Cinderella an ultimatum: marry Prince Charming or be banished to Story's End. Right before Prince Charming and Cinderella kiss, Cinderella defies the fairytale and breaks her glass slipper, making her own fairytale and freeing the other characters from Story's End ("Stronger"). After the little girl tells the Narrator that she likes change, the Narrator agrees to take input from the characters to create "New Fairytales for a New Age." However, Cinderella demands the power for each character to write their own story and to find their own happy every after. As O.F.G. and the little girl leave to return home to Flatbush, O.F.G. reveals that she is Betty Friedan. The musical ends with each character holding a quill, with the possibility of having it all.

== Development ==
Work on a musical based around Britney Spears songs was initially announced in May 2017. A year later Spears attended the first reading of the musical. Theater owner James L. Nederlander announced Once Upon a One More Time would be staged by Broadway In Chicago at the Nederlander Theatre in late fall 2019 prior to a New York City transfer. On May 15, 2023 James L. Nederlander and Hunter Arnold confirmed that Once Upon a One More Time is fully authorized and licensed by Britney Spears, and that the license agreement was negotiated, agreed to and signed post-conservatorship by the Grammy-winner in 2022.

== Productions ==
=== Canceled Chicago premiere (2020) ===
Once Upon a One More Time was initially scheduled to premiere October 29, 2019 in Chicago, but was soon delayed to the following year. The musical premiere at the James M. Nederlander Theatre was then scheduled for April 14, 2020, running through May 17 (anticipating New York previews at the Marquis Theatre on June 26, and a Broadway opening July 30). But on March 12, Illinois Governor J. B. Pritzker announced a ban on all large gatherings through May 1, 2020, in response to the coronavirus pandemic. As a result of widespread theatre closures across the United States, producers canceled the Chicago engagement.

Prior to the cancelation of the Chicago engagement, producers announced casting Briga Heelan as Cinderella and Justin Guarini as Prince Charming, with direction and choreography by Keone and Mari Madrid, the acclaimed husband-wife duo whose choreography work includes Disney's Us Again, Beyond Babel, and music videos & appearances for Justin Bieber, BTS, Billie Eilish, Ed Sheeran, Flying Lotus, and Kendrick Lamar.

In an interview on the podcast Turning Cole Into Diamonds, actor Kevin Trinio Perdido (Prince Mischievous) confirmed that the production remained slated for a Broadway debut in 2022, even without Chicago previews.

=== Washington DC (2021) ===
When theater operations resumed following the Covid-19 pandemic, the show announced a new world premiere run, at the Shakespeare Theatre Company in Washington, D.C., from November 30, 2021 to January 3, 2022 at Sidney Harman Hall. Subsequent demand for tickets extended the engagement to January 9, to become the top-selling show in the company's 35-year history. Ahead of the musical's opening night, Peter Marks of The Washington Post wrote that the musical is "one of the most ambitious new musicals in a theater world awakening to a creative new day. Once Upon a One More Time seems a most unlikely cultural mash-up, reframing Cinderella, Snow White and Sleeping Beauty and a bevy of other storybook characters in an enlightened, modern context. Filling out their story is a narrative inspired by Betty Friedan’s groundbreaking The Feminine Mystique, Spears’s songbook, the choreography of a pair of hip-hop-savvy directors — and American Idol runner-up Justin Guarini as Prince Charming."

In a 2021 interview, star Briga Heelan spoke about "how the show explores the content of the stories we pass on, and the effect they have on the aspirations of the listeners. This raises the question of what kinds of fairy tales we want the next generation to take as their own. Our show speaks to the legacy and the history of these princess stories.” Justin Guarini added, "People are going to come expecting a jukebox musical light, and they’re going to be very pleasantly surprised when they recognize that this is an emotional journey, a beautiful story of discovery and redemption. It turns out that we are able to marry these songs that we cherish to a new set of ideas and concepts. And they take on a whole new life.”

Reviews of the Washington, D.C. production praised the cast's exuberant performances, as well as the musical's clever and timely script. “Once Upon a One More Time is as thought-provoking as it is toe-tapping, as clever as it is hilarious, as bold as it is shiny, and a bona fide success." (DC Metro Theater Arts). BroadwayWorld wrote "the show's high-energy numbers are so full of sharp choreography and powerful vocal performances, you'll want to keep dancing and singing, even after these numbers are over.”The Washington Post lauded Briga Heelan's "winning caliber of poise in her portrayal of Cinderella… and the cast, nearly two dozen strong, meets the material with the zest demanded of them,” but also expressed concern that the production is "vibrating on hyperdrive" and "packs in too many songs." Some critics debated the show's aim to appeal to multiple generations - DC Metro Theater Arts critic John Stoltenberg wrote, “Once Upon a One More Time wakes up centuries of bedtime stories, and I predict it will be an intergenerational smash.” Maya Phillips of The New York Times wrote "The audience cheered at the clever pairings of songs with plot points, like an unfaithful prince singing “Oops! … I Did It Again” or Cinderella’s evil stepmother singing “Toxic." But as I watched the show, I wondered: Who is the target audience? So many Broadway shows are aimed at a general audience, and similarly, this one seems to want to appeal to both children and adults."

=== Broadway (2023) ===
A Broadway run at the Marquis Theatre began previews on May 13, 2023, with the opening on June 22. Keone and Mari Madrid once again directed and choreographed. Briga Heelan, Justin Guarini, Aisha Jackson, and Lauren Zakrin all reprised their respective roles as Cinderella, Prince Charming, Snow White, and The Little Mermaid. Tony nominees Jennifer Simard and Adam Godley replaced Emily Skinner and Michael McGrath as the Stepmother and the Narrator. Britney Spears expressed her love and approval of the show, and it had been made public that the licensing for using her music was reached after her conservatorship. The Broadway production received mixed reviews, lauding the design elements, choreography and acting, but criticizing the weak plot and dated book. After playing 42 previews and 83 performances, the production closed on September 3, 2023.

=== Los Angeles (2025) ===
The show had its Los Angeles premiere in the fall of 2025 with 10 performances at the Jaxx Theatre in East Hollywood under the Actors' Equity Association 50-seat showcase code. Previews began on October 17th and the show closed on November 1st. This production was directed by Colin Tracy, music directed and conducted by Dr. James Lent and featured original choreography by Kasmira Buchanan and Viktor Simon. The production starred Kara Marie as Cinderella, MARQUE as Prince Charming and Emilia Vial as Snow White and featured AEA members Brian Whisenant as the Narrator, Jill Marie Burke as the Stepmother, Michelle Hakala Wolf as OFG and Jeremy Lucas as Clumsy. The show was produced by Jeremy Lucas, JD Morabito & Colin Tracy of Jaxx Theatricals. Reviewers enjoyed the high energy dance numbers and the ingenuity and creativity of Tracy's stage direction.

== Musical numbers ==
=== Washington, D.C. (2021) ===
The Washington, D.C. production featured 23 songs originally recorded by Spears.

Act I

- "...Baby One More Time" – Company
- "Make Me..." – Prince Charming, Cinderella
- "Lucky" – The Princesses
- "Work Bitch" – Belinda, Bethany, Stepmother, Cinderella
- "Boys" / "Pretty Girls" – Cinderella, Bethany, Belinda, Prince Ebullient, Prince Erudite, Prince Suave, Prince Affable, Prince Brawny, Prince Mischievous
- "Circus" – Prince Charming
- "Sometimes" – Cinderella, Prince Charming
- "Oops!...I Did It Again" – Prince Charming, Snow White, Cinderella
- "From the Bottom of My Broken Heart" – Snow White, Clumsy
- "I'm a Slave 4 U" / "Piece of Me" – Belinda, Bethany, Cinderella
- "Womanizer" – Cinderella, Snow White, Sleeping Beauty, Rapunzel, Belle, The Little Mermaid, Princess and the Pea
- "Scream & Shout" – Original Fairy Godmother, The Princesses
- "I Wanna Go" – The Princesses

Act II

- "(You Drive Me) Crazy" – Company
- "Lucky (Reprise)" - Snow White
- "Cinderella" – Cinderella, Prince Charming
- "Toxic" – Stepmother, Narrator
- "Everytime" – Cinderella
- "If I'm Dancing" – The Little Mermaid, Rapunzel
- "Stronger" – Original Fairy Godmother, The Princesses
- "I Wanna Go (Reprise)" - Prince Charming
- "Passenger" – Company
- "Till the World Ends (Megamix)" – Company

=== Broadway (2023) ===
Act I

- "...Baby One More Time" – Company
- "Make Me..." – Prince Charming, Cinderella
- "Lucky" – The Princesses
- "Work Bitch" – Belinda, Betany, Stepmother, Cinderella, Ensemble
- "Brightest Morning Star" - Cinderella, Snow White
- "Boys" / "Pretty Girls" – Cinderella, Betany, Belinda, Prince Ebullient, Prince Erudite, Prince Suave, Prince Affable, Prince Brawny, Prince Mischievous, Female Ensemble
- "Circus" – Prince Charming, Ensemble
- "Sometimes" – Cinderella, Prince Charming
- "Oops!...I Did It Again" – Prince Charming, Snow White, Cinderella
- "From the Bottom of My Broken Heart" – Snow White, Clumsy, Male Ensemble
- "Piece of Me" / "Cinderella" – Belinda, Betany, Cinderella
- "Womanizer" – Cinderella, Snow White, Sleeping Beauty, Rapunzel, Belle, The Little Mermaid, Princess and the Pea
- "Scream & Shout" / "I Wanna Go" – Original Fairy Godmother, The Princesses, Company

Act II

- "(You Drive Me) Crazy" – Company
- ”3” - Prince Charming, Male Ensemble
- "Gimme More" - Company
- "Cinderella (Reprise)" – Cinderella, Prince Charming
- "Toxic" – Stepmother, Narrator, Female Ensemble
- "Everytime" – Cinderella
- "Stronger" – Original Fairy Godmother, The Princesses, Company
- "...Baby One More Time" / "Gimme More" / "Till the World Ends (Megamix)" – Company

== Cast ==
Character	Washington, DC	Broadway
Character	2021	2023
Cinderella	Briga Heelan	Briga Heelan
Prince Charming	Justin Guarini	Justin Guarini
Stepmother	Emily Skinner	Jennifer Simard
Narrator	Michael McGrath	Adam Godley
Fairy Godmother (The O.F.G.)	Brooke Dillman	Brooke Dillman
Snow White	Aisha Jackson	Aisha Jackson
Belinda	MiMi Scardulla	Ryann Redmond^
Betany	Tess Soltau	Tess Soltau
Belle	Belinda Allyn	Liv Battista
Rapunzel	Wonu Ogunfowora	Gabrielle Beckford
Esmeralda		Pauline Casiño
Sleeping Beauty	Ashley Chiu	Liv Battista
Gretel	Selene Haro	Selene Haro
Prince Brawny	Joshua Daniel Johnson	Joshua Daniel Johnson
Goldilocks	Amy Hillner Larsen	Ryah Nixon
Clumsy/Prince Ebullient	Raymond J. Lee	Nathan Levy
Red Riding Hood	Jennifer Florentino	
Prince Mischievous	Kevin Trinio Perdido	Kevin Trinio Perdido
Prince Gregarious		Mikey Ruiz
Prince Erudite	Ryan Steele	Ryan Steele
Prince Suave	Stephen Brower	Josh Tolle
Little Girl	Adrianna Weir Mila Weir	Mila Weir Isabella Ye
Princess Pea	Morgan Whitley	Morgan Whitley
Prince Affable	Stephen Scott Wormley	Stephen Scott Wormley
Little Mermaid	Lauren Zakrin	Lauren Zakrin

^In the second week of previews, Redmond injured her ankle. As a result, Amy Hillner Larsen filled in for the role of Belinda until September 1st, 2023 when Redmond returned to the production. During this time, Ryah Nixon portrayed the role of Goldilocks.

== Awards and nominations ==
=== 2023 Broadway production ===
Year	Award	Category	Nominee	Result
2024	GLAAD Media Awards	Outstanding Broadway Production		Nominated
2024	Outer Critics Circle Awards	Outstanding Featured Performer in a Broadway Musical	Justin Guarini	Nominated
2024	Drama Desk Awards	Outstanding Costume Design of a Musical	Loren Elstein	Nominated

== Film adaptation ==
Sony Pictures acquired film rights to Once Upon a One More Time in April 2019, with Spears producing alongside her ex-manager Larry Rudolph and John Davis through his company Davis Entertainment.

== See also ==
- & Juliet, a jukebox musical based on the music of Max Martin, including five songs made famous by Spears
