= 2008 Ovation Awards =

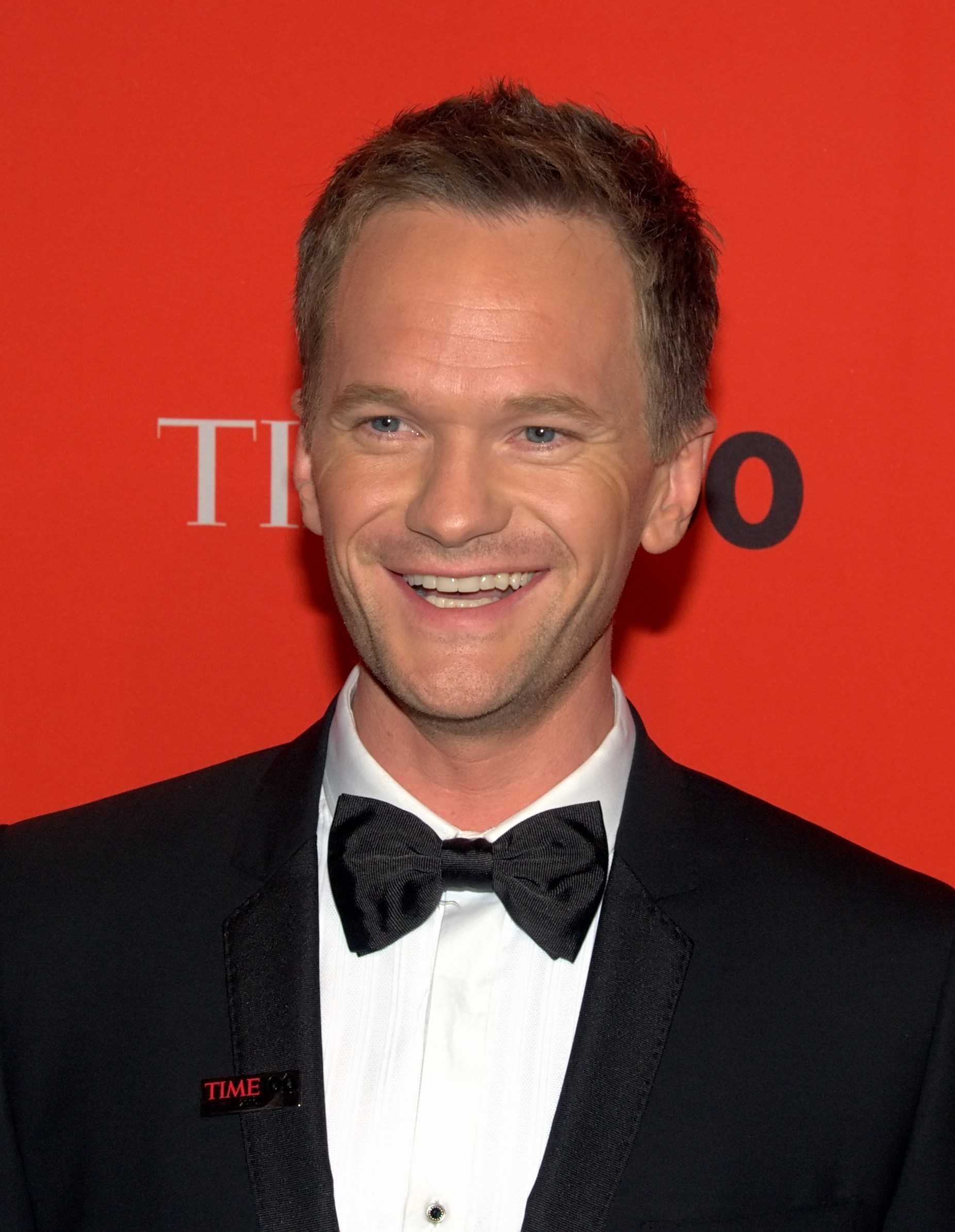
Neil Patrick Harris, ceremony host

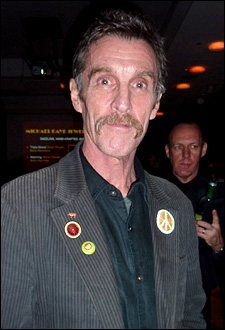
John Glover, winner, Lead Actor in a Play

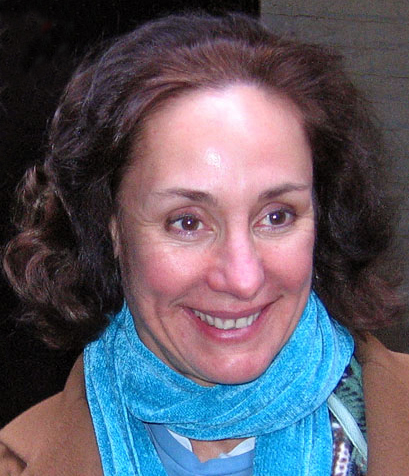
Laurie Metcalf, winner, Lead Actress in a Play

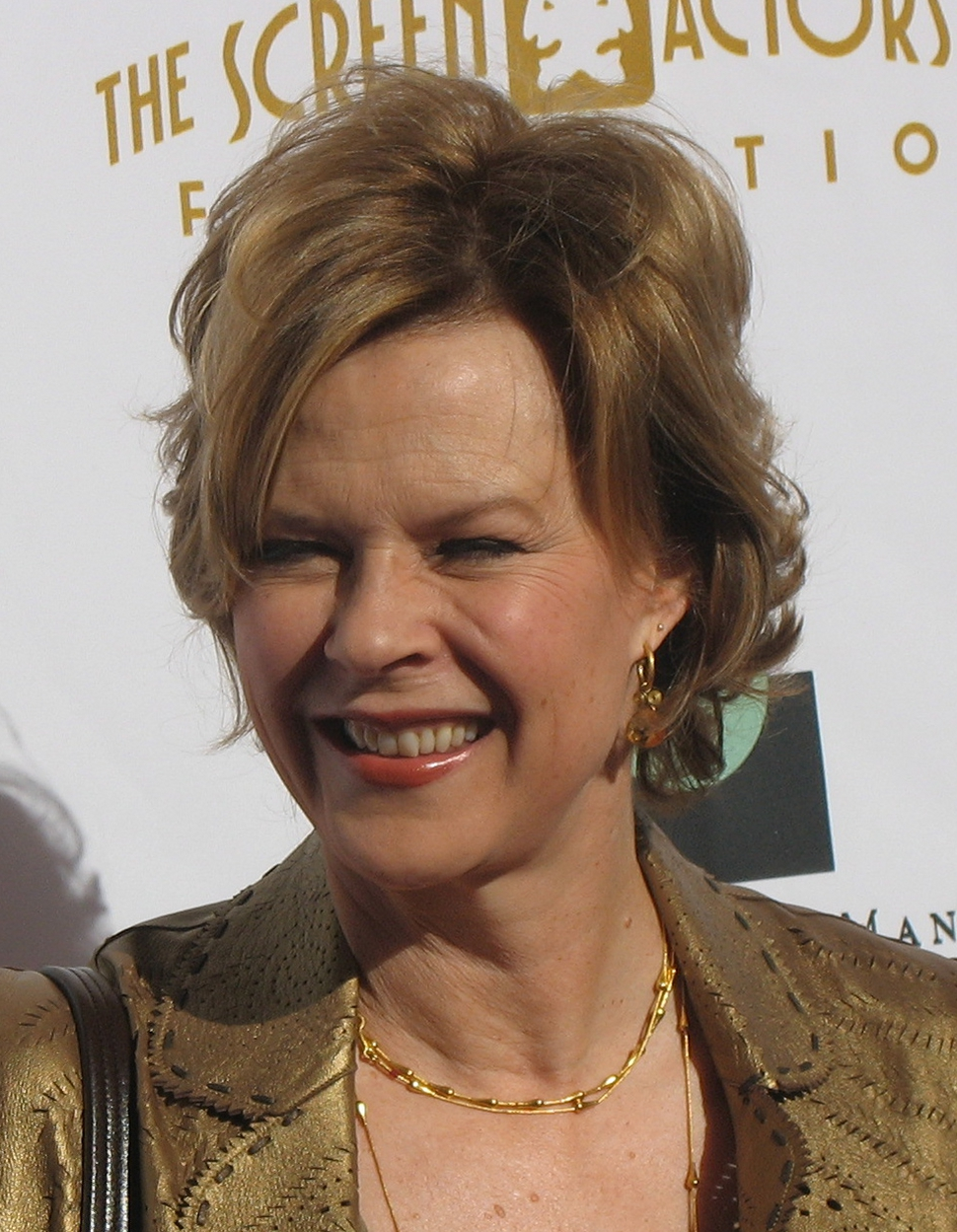
JoBeth Williams, nominee, Lead Actress in a Play

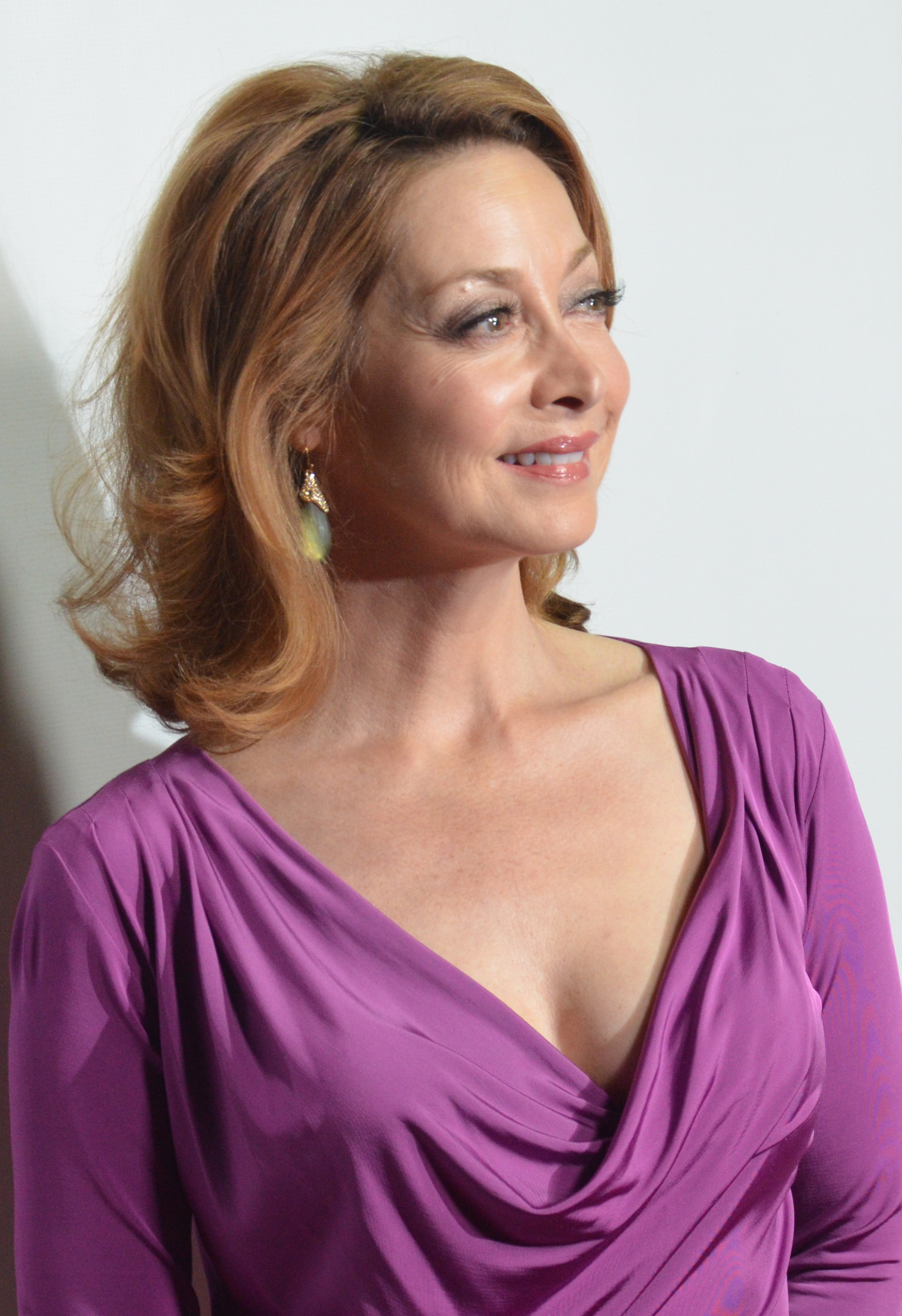
Sharon Lawrence, nominee, Featured Actress in a Play

The nominees for the 2008 Ovation Awards were announced on September 22, 2008. The awards were presented for excellence in stage productions in the Los Angeles area from September 1, 2007 to August 31, 2008 based upon evaluations from members of the Los Angeles theater community.

The winners were announced on November 17, 2008 in a ceremony hosted by Neil Patrick Harris at the Harriet and Charles Luckman Fine Arts Complex on the campus of California State University, Los Angeles in Los Angeles, California.

== Awards ==
Winners are listed first and highlighted in boldface.

Best Production of a Musical (Intimate Theater)	Best Production of a Musical (Large Theater)
**Louis & Keely: Live At The Sahara – Sacred Fools Theatre Company**; City Kid - The Musical – City Kid Productions, LLC; deLEARious – Open Fist Theatre Company; Thrill Me: The Leopold & Loeb Story – Havok Theatre Company; Winter Wondrettes – Marvelous Dreams, LLC; Produced by David Elzer and Peter Schneider	**Miss Saigon – Civic Light Opera Of South Bay Cities**; All Shook Up – Musical Theatre West; The Andrews Brothers – Musical Theatre West; Jekyll & Hyde – Cabrillo Music Theatre; Singin' in the Rain – Cabrillo Music Theatre
Best Production of a Play (Intimate Theater)	Best Production of a Play (Large Theater)
**The Quality Of Life – Geffen Playhouse**; And Neither Have I Wings To Fly – Road Theatre Company; Body Politic – The Echo Theater Company; Lady – Road Theatre Company; The Piano Lesson – The Hayworth, Stagewalkers Productions And 444 Productions; Secrets Of The Trade – Black Dahlia Theatre; Wit – The Pulitzer Prize Winning Masterpiece – The Production Company	**R. Buckminster Fuller: The History (And Mystery) Of The Universe – Rubicon Theatre Company**; Bus Stop – Rubicon Theatre Company; A Delicate Balance – Rubicon Theatre Company; Driving Miss Daisy – La Mirada Theatre For The Performing Arts; En Un Sol Amarillo (Memorias De Un Temblor) – Center Theatre Group: Kirk Douglas Theatre And Fitla
Best Touring Production	Acting Ensemble
**Avenue Q – Center Theatre Group: Ahmanson Theatre**; The Color Purple – Center Theatre Group: Ahmanson Theatre; Produced by Oprah Winfrey, Scott Sanders, Roy Furman, Quincy Jones, et al.; The Drowsy Chaperone – Center Theatre Group: Ahmanson Theatre; My Fair Lady – Center Theatre Group: Ahmanson Theatre; Sweeney Todd – Center Theatre Group: Ahmanson Theatre	**The cast of The Andrews Brothers – Musical Theatre West**; The cast of And Neither Have I Wings To Fly – Road Theatre Company; The cast of Body Politic – The Echo Theater Company; The cast of City Kid – The Musical – City Kid Productions, LLC; The cast of En Un Sol Amarillo (Memorias De Un Temblor) – Center Theatre Group: Kirk Douglas Theatre And Fitla; The cast of Tracers – The Gangbusters Theatre Company; Produced By Leon Shanglebee & Sierra Fisk; The cast of Winter Wonderettes – Marvelous Dreams, LLC; Produced By David Elzer And Peter Schneider
Lead Actor in a Musical	Lead Actress in a Musical
**Robert J. Townsend as Jekyll/Hyde – Jekyll & Hyde – Cabrillo Music Theatre**; Kevin Bailey as The Engineer – Miss Saigon – Civic Light Opera Of South Bay Cities; Jake Broder as Louis Prima – Louis & Keely: Live At The Sahara – Sacred Fools Theatre Company; Brandon Victor Dixon as Ray Charles – Ray Charles Live – The Musical – Pasadena Playhouse; David Engel as Don Lockwood – Singin' in the Rain – Cabrillo Music Theatre; Eric Kunze as Chris – Miss Saigon – Civic Light Opera Of South Bay Cities; Allen E. Read as Rocky – Mask – Pasadena Playhouse	**Jennifer Paz as Kim – Miss Saigon – Civic Light Opera Of South Bay Cities**; Katrina Lenk as Velma Kelly – Chicago – Musical Theatre Of Los Angeles Alliance; Produced By Jeremy Lucas, Bonnie Mcmahan, Justine Baldwin, Mindy Rouff And Mark Espinosa; Lulu Lloyd as Lucy Harris – Jekyll & Hyde – Cabrillo Music Theatre; Bets Malone as Natalie Haller – All Shook Up – Musical Theatre West; Vanessa Claire Smith as Keely Smith – Louis & Keely: Live At The Sahara – Sacred Fools Theatre Company
Lead Actor in a Play – 2 winners	Lead Actress in a Play
**Joe Spano – R. Buckminster Fuller: The History (And Mystery) Of The Universe – Rubicon Theatre Company**; **John Glover – Secrets Of The Trade – Black Dahlia Theatre**; Dennis Boutsikaris as Neil – The Quality Of Life – Geffen Playhouse; Joe Egender as Ted – He Asked For It – Theatre Of Note; V.J. Foster as Cotton Slocum – Carnage, A Comedy – Actors' Gang; Lance E. Nichols as Hoke Coleburn – Driving Miss Daisy – La Mirada Theatre For The Performing Arts; Darrett Sanders as Avram – The Wreck Of The Unfathomable – Theatre Of Note	**Laurie Metcalf as Jeannette – The Quality Of Life – Geffen Playhouse**; Amy Aquino as Joanne – Secrets Of The Trade – Black Dahlia Theatre; Meredith Bishop as Sophie – The Concept Of Remainders – The Production Company; Kathleen Chalfant as Rose – Red Dog Howls – Gang Of Five New York; Karesa McElheny as Vivian Bearing – Wit – The Pulitzer Prize Winning Masterpiece – The Production Company; Tonya Pinkins as Jasmine – And Her Hair Went With Her – Fountain Theatre; Produced By Stephen Sachs; JoBeth Williams as Dinah – The Quality Of Life – Geffen Playhouse
Featured Actor in a Musical	Featured Actress in a Musical
**Randy Rogel as Cosmo Brown – Singin' in the Rain – Cabrillo Music Theatre**; John Bisom as The Scarecrow – The Wizard Of Oz – Musical Theatre West; Danny Calvert as Dennis – All Shook Up – Musical Theater West; Larry Cedar as Finsdale – Li'l Abner – Reprise Theatre Company; Barry Pearl as Jim Haller – All Shook Up -Musical Theatre West; Aaron Phillips as John Utterson – Jekyll & Hyde – Cabrillo Music Theatre; Harrison White as John – Miss Saigon – Civic Light Opera Of South Bay Cities	**Gwen Stewart as Sylvia – All Shook Up – Musical Theatre West**; Misty Cotton as Ellen – Miss Saigon – Civic Light Opera Of South Bay Cities; Melissa Fahn as Lina Lamont – Singin' in the Rain – Cabrillo Music Theatre; Megan Lawrence as Charlotte – Flora, The Red Menace – Reprise Theatre Company; Tracy Lore as Miss Sandra – All Shook Up – Musical Theatre West; Beth Obregon as Emma Carew – Jekyll & Hyde – Cabrillo Music Theatre; Cathy Rigby as Mammy Yokum – Li'l Abner – Reprise Theatre Company
Featured Actor in a Play	Featured Actress in a Play
**Barry Lynch as Candy – Of Mice and Men – Theatre Banshee**; Mark Colson as Slim – Of Mice and Men – Theatre Banshee; JD Cullum as Joseph Tumulty – Of Equal Measure – Center Theatre Group: Kirk Douglas Theatre; Mark Doerr as Graham – Lady – Road Theatre Company; Bennet Guillory as Wining Boy – The Piano Lesson – The Hayworth, Stagewalkers Productions And 444 Productions; Morgan Rusler as Boolie Werthan – Driving Miss Daisy – La Mirada Theatre For The Performing Arts; Mark Taylor as Peter – Secrets Of The Trade – Black Dahlia Theatre	**J. Nicole Brooks as Nina – As Much as You Can – Hendel Productions West; Produced By Steve And Ruth Hendel And David Tarlow**; Kathleen Mary Carthy as Marin – The Wreck Of The Unfathomable – Theatre Of Note; Francesca Casale as Cheetah Bee – The Fastest Clock in the Universe – Celebration Theatre; Sharon Lawrence as Vivien Leigh – Orson'S Shadow – Pasadena Playhouse; Johanna McKay as Mrs. Burns – Teen Girl – Zephyr Theatre; Produced By Linda Toliver And Gary Guidinger; Lauren Patten as Elma – Bus Stop – Rubicon Theatre Company; Chloe Taylor as Mary – Teen Girl – Zephyr Theatre; Produced By Linda Toliver And Gary Guidinger
Director of a Musical	Director of a Play
**Nick Degruccio – Jekyll & Hyde – Cabrillo Music Theatre**; Jeremy Aldridge Louis & Keely: Live At The Sahara – Sacred Fools Theatre Company; Roger Bean – Winter Wonderettes – Marvelous Dreams, LLC; Produced By David Elzer And Peter Schneider; Stephanie Coltrin – Miss Saigon – Civic Light Opera Of South Bay Cities; Nick Degruccio – The Andrews Brothers – Musical Theatre West; Steven Glaudini – All Shook Up – Musical Theatre West; Larry Raben – Singin' in the Rain – Cabrillo Music Theatre	**Matt Shakman – Secrets Of The Trade – Black Dahlia Theatre**; Jane Anderson – The Quality Of Life – Geffen Playhouse; Cesar Brie, En Un Sol Amarillo (Memorias De Un Temblor) – Center Theatre Group: Kirk Douglas Theatre And Fitla; Scott Cummins – And Neither Have I Wings To Fly – Road Theatre Company; D.W. Jacobs, R. Buckminster Fuller: The History (And Mystery) Of The Universe) – Rubicon Theatre Company; Derek Charles Livingston – Shakespeare's R & J – The Production Company; Robert Mammana – Wit – The Pulitzer Prize Winning Masterpiece – The Production Company
Music Direction	Choreography
**Alby Potts – Singin' in the Rain – Cabrillo Music Theatre**; Steven Applegate – Jekyll & Hyde – Cabrillo Music Theatre; Darryl Archibald – Li'l Abner – Reprise Theatre Company; Michael Borth – All Shook Up – Musical Theatre West; Patrick Gandy – City Kid – The Musical – City Kid Productions, LLC; John Glaudini – The Andrews Brothers – Musical Theatre West; Alby Potts – Miss Saigon – Civic Light Opera Of South Bay Cities	**Bradley Rapier – City Kid – The Musical – City Kid Productions, LLC**; Roger Castellano – The Andrews Brothers – Musical Theatre West; Roger Castellano – Jekyll & Hyde – Cabrillo Music Theatre; David Engel – Singin' in the Rain – Cabrillo Music Theatre; Jeremy Lucas – Chicago – Musical Theatre Of Los Angeles Alliance; Produced By Jeremy Lucas, Bonnie McMahan, Justine Baldwin, Mindy Rouff, And Mark Espinosa; Lee Martino – All Shook Up – Musical Theatre West; Karen Nowicki – Miss Saigon – Civic Light Opera Of South Bay Cities
Book/Lyrics/Music for an Original Musical	Playwrighting For An Original Play
**John Bucchino And Daisy Prince – It's Only Life – Rubicon Theatre Company; Produced By Michael Jackowitz**; Meryl Friedman – Tug Of War – The J. Paul Getty Trust; Maury McIntyre And Nick Salamone – Gulls – The Theatre @ Boston Court; Jan Powell And Ken Stone – American Tales – The Antaeus Company; Phil Swann And Ron West – deLEARious – Open Fist Theatre Company	**Jane Anderson – The Quality Of Life – Geffen Playhouse**; Richard Martin Hirsch – The Concept Of Remainders – The Production Company; Joe Keyes – Big Baby – Produced By Joe Keyes, Heather King And Maile Flanagan; Alex Lyras & Robert McCaskill – The Common Air – Elephant Stageworks; Timothy McNeil – Anything – Elephant Stageworks; Produced By Lindsay Albaugh And Gina Soto; Erik Patterson – He Asked For It – Theatre Of Note; Jonathan Tolins – Secrets Of The Trade – Black Dahlia Theatre
Costume Design (Intimate Theater)	Costume Design (Large Theater)
**Scott A. Lane – Pest Control – The Musical – Open At The Top Productions And Canum Entertainment**; Stephanie Kerley-Schwartz & Lauren Tyler – Compleat Female Stage Beauty – Rogue Machine; Produced By John Perrin Flynn And Matthew Elkins; Gelareh Khalioun – And Neither Have I Wings To Fly – Road Theatre Company; Shon Le Blanc – The Milk Train Doesn't Stop Here Anymore – Fountain Theatre; Produced By Ben Bradley And Diana Gibson; Nalia Sanders – The Piano Lesson – The Hayworth, Stagewalkers Productions And 444 Productions; A. Jeffrey Shoenberg – 1776 – Actors Co-Op/Crossley Theatre; A. Jeffrey Shoenberg – Tonight At 8:30 – Part II: Come The Wild – The Antaeus Company	**Paul Tazewell – Ray Charles Live – A New Musical – Pasadena Playhouse**; Ann Closs-Farley – Norman's Ark – John Anson Ford Theatre And Duhirst Music (Us) Ltd.; Marcy Froehlich – Bus Stop – Rubicon Theatre Company; Marcy Froehlich – Picasso At The Lapin Agile – Rubicon Theatre Company; Shon Le Blanc – You Can'T Take It With You – Rubicon Theatre Company; Sharell Martin And Ambra Wakefield – Jekyll & Hyde – Fclo Music Theatre; Naomi Yoshida – Pippin – East West Players
Lighting Design (Intimate Theater)	Lighting Design (Large Theater)
**Jeremy Pivnick – Crime And Punishment – Actors Co-Op/Crossley Theatre**; Leigh Allen – Snake in the Grass – Salem K Theatre Company; Derrick McDaniel – Lady – Road Theatre Company; Luke Moyer, Pest Control – The Musical – Open At The Top Productions And Canum Entertainment; Jeremy Pivnick – 1001 – The Theatre @ Boston Court; August Viverito – Wit – The Pulitzer Prize Winning Masterpiece – The Production Company; Steven Young – Thrill Me: The Leopold & Loeb Story – Havok Theatre Company	**Darrell Clark – Miss Saigon – Civic Light Opera Of South Bay Cities**; Howell Binkley – Clay – Center Theatre Group: Kirk Douglas Theatre; Michael Gilliam, Red Dog Howls – Gang Of Five New York; Jeremy Pivnick – Dawn's Light: The Journey Of Gordon Hirabayashi – East West Players; Jeremy Pivnick – Picasso At The Lapin Agile – Rubicon Theatre Company; Jean-Yves Tessier – Singin' in the Rain – Cabrillo Music Theatre; Steven Young – Jekyll & Hyde – Cabrillo Music Theatre
Set Design (Intimate Theater)	Set Design (Large Theater)
**Desma Murphy – And Neither Have I Wings To Fly – Road Theatre Company**; Danny Cistone – The Last Days Of Judas Iscariot – 68 Cent Crew Theatre Company; Produced By Ronnie Marmo; Danny Cistone – On An Average Day – Elephant Stageworks And Vs. Theatre Company; Joel Daavid – The Piano Lesson – The Hayworth, Stagewalkers Productions And 444 Productions; Helen Harwell – Crime And Punishment – Actors Co-Op/Crossley Theatre; Laura Fine Hawkes – Snake in the Grass – Salem K Theatre Company; Gary Smoot – Love Loves A Pornographer – Circle X Theatre Company	**Thomas S. Giamario – Bus Stop – Rubicon Theatre Company**; Tom Buderwitz – Picasso At The Lapin Agile – Rubicon Theatre Company; Robert Brill – Bloody Bloody Andrew Jackson – Center Theatre Group: Kirk Douglas Theatre And The Public Theatre; Gonzalo Callejas – En Un Sol Amarillo (Memorias De Un Temblor) – Center Theatre Group: Kirk Douglas Theatre And Fitla; David Rockwell – All Shook Up – Musical Theatre West; Gary Wissman – A Delicate Balance – Rubicon Theatre Company; Gary Wissman – You Can't Take It With You – Rubicon Theatre Company
Sound Design (Intimate Theater)	Sound Design (Large Theater)
**Ken Rich – The Common Air – Elephant Stageworks**; John Ballinger – 1001 – The Theatre @ Boston Court; David B. Marling – Lady – Road Theatre Company; Cricket S. Myers – Dark Play Or Stories For Boys – The Theatre @ Boston Court; John Nobori – The Tragical Comedy Of Mr. Punch – Bootleg Theatre And The Rogue Artists Ensemble; Ken Sawyer – Crime And Punishment – Actors Co-Op/Crossley Theatre; Eric Snodgrass – Snake in the Grass – Salem K Theatre Company	**John Feinstein – Miss Saigon – Civic Light Opera Of South Bay Cities**; David Beaudry – Bus Stop – Rubicon Theatre Company; Jonathan Burke – Singin' in the Rain – Cabrillo Music Theatre; Giampaolo Nalli And Danuta Zarzyka – En Un Sol Amarillo (Memorias De Un Temblor) – Center Theatre Group: Kirk Douglas Theatre And Fitla; Cricket S. Myers – Emergency – Geffen Playhouse; Cricket S. Myers – Norman's Ark – John Anson Ford Theatre And Duhirst Music (Us) Ltd.; Cricket S. Myers – Picasso At The Lapin Agile – Rubicon Theatre Company
