= Barry Lynch =

American actor born 1944

- Born: Barry J. Lynch; 1944 (age 81–82); Brooklyn, New York, U.S.
- Occupation: Actor
- Years active: 1980–present
- Family: Richard Lynch (brother)

Barry J. Lynch is an American actor.

== Awards and nominations ==
Awards	Production	Category	Venue/Prod Company	Result	Notes
2008 Ovation Awards	Of Mice and Men	Best Featured Actor in a Play	Theatre Banshee	Won	
