= Aisha Jackson =

American actress

Aisha Jackson is an American actress and performer. She is best known for her Broadway career.

== Early life ==
Jackson is from College Park, Georgia. She graduated from the University of Northern Colorado in 2013.

== Career ==
Jackson made her Broadway debut in 2015 as a swing in Beautiful: The Carole King Musical.

In 2018, Jackson was cast as the Standby for Anna in Frozen on Broadway. She made her debut in the role in March 2018 and was the first Black woman to play Anna on Broadway. Jackson departed the Broadway company of Frozen in February 2020.

Jackson originated the role of Snow White in the Britney Spears jukebox musical Once Upon a One More Time at its world premiere in Washington, DC in 2021. She also originated the role on Broadway in 2023.

Jackson played Deena Jones in Dreamgirls at The MUNY in June 2024. That October, she replaced Joy Woods as Middle Allie in The Notebook on Broadway.

In 2025, Jackson headlined the New York City Center Encores! production of Wonderful Town with Anika Noni Rose. In June, she replaced Sarah Hyland as Daisy Buchanan in The Great Gatsby on Broadway.

== Theatre credits ==
Ref:

Years	Title	Role	Venue	Notes
2011	Hairspray	Little Inez	Arvada Center	
2012	Legally Blonde	Pilar	Arvada Center	
2014	Witness Uganda	Ensemble u/s Grace / Eden	American Repertory Theatre	World premiere cast
2014	Once on This Island	Ti Moune	Olney Theatre Center	
2015	Beautiful: The Carole King Musical	Swing	Stephen Sondheim Theatre	Broadway replacement
2015	Witness Uganda	Ensemble u/s Grace / Eden	Second Stage Theatre	Off-Broadway
2016	A Bronx Tale: The Musical	Ensemble	Paper Mill Playhouse	
2016	Ragtime	Sarah	Ellis Island	Concert
2016-2017	Waitress	Ensemble	Lena Horne Theatre	Original Broadway cast
2017	Frozen	s/b Anna	Denver Center for the Performing Arts	World premiere cast
2018-2020	Frozen	s/b Anna	St. James Theatre	Original Broadway cast
2021-2022	Once Upon a One More Time	Snow White	Sidney Harman Hall	Shakespeare Theatre Company; World premiere cast
2022	Paradise Square	s/b Nelly O'Brien	Ethel Barrymore Theatre	Original Broadway cast
2022	Sister Act	Deloris Van Cartier	North Carolina Theatre	
2023	Once Upon a One More Time	Snow White	Marquis Theatre	Original Broadway cast
2023	Pal Joey	Linda English	New York City Center	Off-Broadway
2024	Dreamgirls	Deena Jones	The Muny	
2024	The Notebook	Middle Allie	Gerald Schoenfeld Theatre	Broadway replacement
2025	Wonderful Town	Eileen Sherwood	New York City Center	Off-Broadway
2025-2026	The Great Gatsby	Daisy Buchanan	Broadway Theatre	Broadway replacement
