= Lauren Zakrin =

American musical theatre actress

- Born: Lauren Ashley Zakrin; 1988 or 1989 (age 37–38); Rochester, Michigan, U.S.
- Education: Western Michigan University (BFA)
- Occupations: Actress; singer; dancer
- Years active: 2008–present
- Website: laurenashleyzakrin.com

Lauren Ashley Zakrin (born 1988 or 1989) is an American musical theatre actress. She was a finalist in MTV's Legally Blonde: The Musical – The Search for Elle Woods, coming in fourth place overall. She has appeared on Broadway, as well as in national tours and regional theatre.

== Early life and education ==
Zakrin was born in Rochester, Michigan, and attended Western Michigan University.

== Career ==
Zakrin first became known as a finalist on MTV's 2008 reality TV show Legally Blonde: The Musical – The Search for Elle Woods. She made her professional acting debut as the understudy for the role of Elle Woods in the first US tour of the musical Legally Blonde; she and Laura Bell Bundy covered the role while Becky Gulsvig was unable to perform. The following year, Zakrin acted as a replacement in the leading role of Sandy in the US tour of Grease. From 2010 to 2011, she was an ensemble member and the understudy for Glinda in the first national tour of Wicked.

During the summer of 2011, Zakrin played Elle Woods in a regional production of Legally Blonde at The Muny Theater in St. Louis, Missouri. Following this, she starred as Brooke Pennington in the Las Vegas production of the 2012 Beach Boys musical Surf at Planet Hollywood, directed by Kristin Hanggi. In 2013, she joined the Off-Broadway cast of Natasha, Pierre & The Great Comet of 1812 as an ensemble member, while understudying the roles of Natasha and Sonya. She made her Broadway debut a year later, in 2014, as a replacement for the leading role of Sherrie in Rock of Ages.

In 2015, Zakrin reprised her roles in the American Repertory Theater production of Natasha, Pierre & The Great Comet of 1812. She remained in the cast during the show's transfer to Broadway from the fall of 2016 until 2017, when it officially closed. In 2017, she originated the role of Kathryn Merteuil in the Off-Broadway production of Cruel Intentions: The '90s Musical and remained in the show until its closure in 2018.

Zakrin appeared as an ensemble member in the NBC television special Jesus Christ Superstar Live in Concert in 2018. In early 2019, she played the lead role of Riley in the Off-Broadway musical We Are the Tigers. Later that year, she played Audrey in a regional production of Little Shop of Horrors. Zakrin was cast to play the role of Polly in the San Francisco production of Harry Potter and the Cursed Child, which opened in 2019. She also understudied the roles of Delphi and Moaning Myrtle. The production temporarily closed in 2020 due to the COVID-19 pandemic. In October 2021, Zakrin announced via Instagram that she would be joining the cast of Once Upon a One More Time during its tryout run at the Sidney Harman Hall in Washington D.C. as Ariel (based on the character from The Little Mermaid). The production began performances on November 30, 2021, and concluded on January 9, 2022.

== Theatre credits ==
Year	Title	Role	Theatre	Director(s)	Ref.
2008–2009	Legally Blonde	Elle Woods u/s	National tour	Jerry Mitchell	
2009–2010	Grease	Sandy Dumbrowski (replacement)	National tour	Kathleen Marshall	
2010–2011	Wicked	Ensemble (u/s Glinda)	National tour	Joe Mantello	
2011	Legally Blonde	Elle Woods	The Muny	Marc Bruni	
2012	Surf	Brooke Pennington	Planet Hollywood Las Vegas	Kristin Hanggi	
2013	Natasha, Pierre & The Great Comet of 1812	Ensemble (u/s Natasha/Sonya)	Kazino Meatpacking District / Kazino Times Square	Rachel Chavkin	
2014	**Rock of Ages**	Sherrie Christian (replacement)	Helen Hayes Theatre	Kristin Hanggi	
2015	**Natasha, Pierre & The Great Comet of 1812**	Ensemble (u/s Natasha)	American Repertory Theater (out-of-town tryout)	Rachel Chavkin	
2016–2017	**Natasha, Pierre & The Great Comet of 1812**	Ensemble (u/s Natasha/Sonya)	Imperial Theatre	Rachel Chavkin	
2017–2018	Cruel Intentions: The '90s Musical	Kathryn Merteuil	(Le) Poisson Rouge	Lindsey Rosin	
2019	We Are the Tigers	Riley Williams	Theatre 80 St. Marks	Michael Bello	
2019	Little Shop of Horrors	Audrey	The Cape Playhouse	Michael Rader	
2019–2020	Harry Potter and the Cursed Child	Polly Chapman (u/s Delphi/Myrtle)	Curran Theatre	John Tiffany	
2021–2022	Once Upon a One More Time	Little	Sidney Harman Hall (out-of-town tryout)	Keone and Mari Madrid	
2022	**Harry Potter and the Cursed Child**	Moaning Myrtle (u/s Delphi)	The Lyric Theatre	John Tiffany	
2023	**Once Upon a One More Time**	Little (u/s Cin/Snow White/Betany)	Marquis Theatre	Keone and Mari Madrid	

• Credits in bold indicate Broadway production(s)

== Filmography ==
Television

Year	Title	Role	Notes
2008	Legally Blonde: The Musical – The Search for Elle Woods	Herself	Fourth place finalist
2018	Jesus Christ Superstar Live in Concert	Ensemble	
