= 2016 Ovation Awards =

Annual American slate of theatrical awards for southern California

The nominees for the 2016 Ovation Awards aka the 27th Annual LA STAGE Alliance Ovation Awards were announced on November 2, 2016, by the Los Angeles Stage Alliance.

The awards were presented for excellence in stage productions in the Los Angeles area from September 2015 to August 2016 based upon evaluations from approximately 250 members of the Los Angeles theater community. The Ovation Awards are the only peer-judged theater awards in Los Angeles.

The winners were announced on January 17, 2017, in a ceremony at the Ahmanson Theatre in Los Angeles, California. The ceremony was hosted by actress Alexandra Billings.

== Awards ==
Winners are listed first and highlighted in boldface.

Best Season	Best Presented Production
**Los Angeles LGBT Center**; Celebration Theatre; Geffen Playhouse	**1984 - The Broad Stage**; A Gentleman's Guide to Love and Murder - Center Theatre Group; Jane Austen Unscripted - The Broad Stage
Best Production of a Musical (Intimate Theater)	Best Production of a Musical (Large Theater)
**The Boy From Oz - Celebration Theatre**; We Are The Tigers: A New Musical - Heart and Flame Productions; The 25th Annual Putnam County Spelling Bee - Sierra Madre Playhouse	**Ham: A Musical Memoir - Los Angeles LGBT Center**; American Idiot - La Mirada Theatre for the Performing Arts; First Date - La Mirada Theatre for the Performing Arts
Best Production of a Play (Intimate Theater)	Best Production of a Play (Large Theater)
**Dry Land - The Echo Theater Company**; Ameryka - Critical Mass Performance Group; Hit The Wall - Los Angeles LGBT Center; Space - Crooked Arrow Productions; My Mañana Comes - Fountain Theatre; Honky - Rogue Machine; Church & State - Skylight Theatre Company	**Guards at The Taj - Geffen Playhouse**; Endgame - Center Theatre Group; Barcelona - Geffen Playhouse; The Complete History of America (Abridged) - Falcon Theatre; Mojada: A Medea In Los Angeles - The Getty Villa & The Theatre @ Boston Court
Lead Actor in a Musical	Lead Actress in a Musical
**Sam Harris as Multiple Characters - Ham: A Musical Memoir - Los Angeles LGBT Center**; Jon Jon Briones as Georges - La Cage Aux Folles - East West Players; David Lamarr as James Thunder Early - Dreamgirls - La Mirada Theatre For The Performing Arts; Marc Ginsburg as Aaron - First Date - La Mirada Theatre For The Performing Arts; Andrew Bongiorno as Peter Allen - The Boy From Oz - Celebration Theatre	**Moya Angela as Effie - Dreamgirls - La Mirada Theatre For The Performing Arts**; Rachel York as “little” Edie Beale/Edith - Grey Gardens - Center Theatre Group; Brittney Johnson as Lorell Robinson - Dreamgirls - La Mirada Theatre For The Performing Arts; Erica Lustig as Casey - First Date - La Mirada Theatre For The Performing Arts; Alison Luff as Charlie Jane - Breaking Through - Pasadena Playhouse
Lead Actor in a Play	Lead Actress in a Play
**Sam Anderson as John - John Is A Father - The Road Theatre Company**; Barry Mcgovern as Clov - Endgame - Center Theatre Group; Sterling K. Brown as Hero/Ulysses - Father Comes Home From The Wars (Parts 1, 2 & 3) - Center Theatre Group; Stefan Marks as Kurt Finge - Space - Crooked Arrow Productions; Ramiz Monsef as Babur - Guards At The Taj - Geffen Playhouse; Erik Odom as Raleigh - See Rock City - Rubicon Theatre Company; Rob Nagle as Charlie Whitmore - Church & State - Skylight Theatre Company	**Lily Nicksay as May - See Rock City - Rubicon Theatre Company**; Betty Gilpin as Irene - Barcelona - Geffen Playhouse; Angelle Brooks as Ruth Younger - A Raisin In The Sun - Ruskin Group Theatre Co; Starletta Dupois as Mama Lena Younger - A Raisin In The Sun - Ruskin Group Theatre Co; Kate Morgan Chadwick as Holly - Bed - The Echo Theater Company; Connor Kelly-Eiding as Ester - Dry Land - The Echo Theater Company; Danielle Truitt as Camae - The Mountaintop - The Matrix Theatre Company
Featured Actor in a Musical	Featured Actress in a Musical
**Stanton Morales as Barfee - The 25th Annual Putnam County Spelling Bee - Sierra Madre Playhouse**; Ryan Driscoll as Cain/Japheth - Children Of Eden - Cabrillo Music Theatre; Leigh Wakeford as Man #2 - First Date - La Mirada Theatre For The Performing Arts; Justin Michael Wilcox as Man #1 - First Date - La Mirada Theatre For The Performing Art; Elijah Rock as Cab Calloway - I Only Have Eyes For You - The Al Dubin Musical/corky Hale; Wilkie Ferguson III as Jesse Belvin - Recorded In Hollywood - Theatre Planners; Matt Magnusson as Huggy Boy - Recorded In Hollywood - Theatre Planners	**Bess Motta as Judy Garland - The Boy From Oz - Celebration Theatre**; Natalia Vivino as Yonah - Children Of Eden - Cabrillo Music Theatre; Kelly Lester as Marion Woolnough - The Boy From Oz - Celebration Theatre; Jessica Pennington as Liza Minnelli - The Boy From Oz - Celebration Theatre; Betty Buckley as Edith Bouvior Beale - Grey Gardens - Center Theatre Group; Michele Spears as Ensemble - Sondheim Unscripted - Impro Theatre; Cristina Gerla as Olive - The 25th Annual Putnam County Spelling Bee - Sierra Madre Playhouse
Featured Actor in a Play	Featured Actress in a Play
**Michael Shepperd as Actor 4 - Bootycandy - Celebration Theatre**; James Greene as Nagg - Endgame - Center Theatre Group; Michael Mckean as Colonel - Father Comes Home From The Wars (Parts 1, 2 & 3) - Center Theatre Group; Larry Powell as Homer - Father Comes Home From The Wars (Parts 1, 2 & 3) - Center Theatre Group; Ray Ford as Gene Jefferson - Ameryka - Critical Mass Performance Group; Robert Gossett as Oz - Watching O.J. - Ensemble Studio Theatre/LA Matthew Hancock as Carson - Hit The Wall - Los Angeles LGBT Center	**Paula Christensen as Nicky - Colony Collapse - The Theatre @ Boston Court**; Charlotte Rae as Nell - Endgame - Center Theatre Group; Sameerah Luqmaan-Harris as Penny - Father Comes Home From The Wars (Parts 1, 2 & 3) - Center Theatre Group; Patrena Murray as Fourth/Odyssey Dog - Father Comes Home From The Wars (Parts 1, 2 & 3) - Center Theatre Group; Robin Pearson Rose as Aoife - Outside Mullingar - Geffen Playhouse; Sharon Sharth as Mrs. Gill - See Rock City - Rubicon Theatre Company; Vivis as Tita - Mojada: A Medea In Los Angeles - The Getty Villa & The Theatre @ Boston Court
Acting Ensemble of a Musical	Acting Ensemble of a Play
**The cast of The Boy From Oz - Celebration Theatre**; The cast of American Idiot - La Mirada Theatre for the Performing Arts; The cast of Dreamgirls - La Mirada Theatre for the Performing Arts; The cast of Empire- La Mirada Theatre for the Performing Arts; The cast of First Date - La Mirada Theatre for the Performing Arts; The cast of I Only Have Eyes For You - The Al Dubin Musical/Corky Hale; The cast of Recorded in Hollywood - Theatre Planners	**The cast of The Complete History of America (Abridged) - Falcon Theatre**; The cast of Endgame - Center Theatre Group; The cast of Barcelona - Geffen Playhouse; The cast of Father Comes Home From The War (Parts 1, 2, & 3) - Center Theatre Group; The cast of My Mañana Comes - Fountain Theatre; The cast of Hit The Wall - Los Angeles LGBT Center; The cast of Fly - Pasadena Playhouse
Director of a Musical	Director of a Play
**Michael Shepperd - The Boy From Oz - Celebration Theatre**; Oanh Nguyen - A Chorus Line - Chance Theater; Brian Kite - American Idiot - La Mirada Theatre For The Performing Arts; Nick Degruccio - First Date - La Mirada Theatre For The Performing Arts; Billy Porter & Ken Sawyer - Ham: A Musical Memoir - Los Angeles LGBT Center	**Ken Sawyer - Hit The Wall - Los Angeles LGBT Center**; Alan Mandell - Endgame - Center Theatre Group; Joseph Calarco - The Sparrow - Coeurage Theatre Company; Jerry Kernion - The Complete History Of America (Abridged) - Falcon Theatre; Trip Cullman - Barcelona - Geffen Playhouse; Giovanna Sardelli - Guards At The Taj - Geffen Playhouse; Katharine Farmer - See Rock City - Rubicon Theatre Company
Music Direction	Choreography
**Todd Schroeder - Ham: A Musical Memoir - Los Angeles LGBT Center**; Patrick Sulken - We Are The Tigers: A New Musical - Heart and Flame Productions; David O - American Idiot - La Mirada Theatre for the Performing Arts; Bryan Blaskie - The Boy From Oz - Celebration Theatre; Gerald Sternbach - I Only Have Eyes For You - The Al Dubin Musical/Corky Hale	**Janet Roston - The Boy From Oz - Celebration Theatre**; Annie Yee - The Golden Dragon - The Theatre @ Boston Court; Tasheena Medina - The Sparrow - Coeurage Theatre Company; Dana Solimando - American Idiot - La Mirada Theatre for the Performing Arts; John Farmanesh-Bocca - Tempest Redux - Odyssey Theatre Company & New American Theatre
Book for an Original Musical	Lyrics/Music for an Original Musical
**Michael Shaw Fisher - Shakespeare’s Last Night Out - Orgasmico Theatre Company**; Mo Willems - Elephant & Piggie’s: “We Are In A Play!” - MainStreet Theatre Company; Robert Hull & Caroline Sherman - Empire - La Mirada Theatre for the Performing Arts	**Preston Max Allen - We Are The Tigers: A New Musical - Heart and Flame Productions**; Deborah Wicks-la Puma & Mo Willems - Elephant & Piggie’s: “We Are In A Play!” - MainStreet Theatre Company; Michael Shaw Fisher - Shakespeare’s Last Night Out - Orgasmico Theatre Company
Playwrighting For An Original Play	Video/Projection Design
**Luis Alfaro - Mojada: A Medea In Los Angeles - The Getty Villa & The Theatre @ Boston Court**; Nancy Keystone - Ameryka - Critical Mass Performance Group; Stefan Marks - Space - Crooked Arrow Productions; Julie Myatt - John Is A Father - The Road Theatre Company; Jason Williams - Church & State - Skylight Theatre Company; Eric Patterson - One of The Nice Ones - The Echo Theater Company; Jason Wells - The Engine Of Our Ruin - The Victory Theatre Center	**Matthew Hill - Man Covets Bird - 24th Street Theatre**; Dallas Nicholas - Wood Boy Dog Fish - Bootleg Theater & Rogue Artists Ensemble; Stephen Epstein & Ron Wood - Space - Crooked Arrow Productions; Jonathan Infante - American Idiot - La Mirada Theatre For The Performing Arts; David Gallo & Brad Peterson - Empire - La Mirada Theatre For The Performing Arts; Adam Flemming - Wicked Lit 2015 - Unbound Productions; Hana Kim - The City Of Conversation - Wallis Annenberg Center For The Performing Arts
Lighting Design (Intimate Theater)	Lighting Design (Large Theater)
**Elizabeth Harper - The Golden Dragon - The Theatre @ Boston Court**; Karyn Lawrence - Colony Collapse - The Theatre @ Boston Court; Matthew Denman - Bootycandy - Celebration Theatre; Tim Swiss - Dream Boy - Celebration Theatre; Elizabeth Harper - Ameryka - Critical Mass Performance Group; Matt Richter - Hit The Wall - Los Angeles LGBT Center; Katelan Braymer - The Hairy Ape - Odyssey Theatre Ensemble	**KC Wilkerson - Wicked Lit 2015 - Unbound Productions**; Jared Sayeg - Endgame - Center Theatre Group; Japhy Weideman - Barcelona - Geffen Playhouse; Lap Chi Chu - Guards At The Taj - Geffen Playhouse; Daniel Ionazzi - Outside Mullingar - Geffen Playhouse; Steven Young - American Idiot - La Mirada Theatre For The Performing Arts; Mike Billings - See Rock City - Rubicon Theatre Company
Scenic Design (Intimate Theater)	Scenic Design (Large Theater)
**John Vertrees & Erin Walley - Deathtrap - Sierra Madre Playhouse**; Sara Ryung Clement - Seven Spots On The Sun - The Theatre @ Boston Court; Stephen Gifford - Dream Boy - Celebration Theatre; John Iacovelli - Kingdom Of Earth - Dance On Productions In Assoc. w/ Linda Toliver & Gary Guidinger; John Iacovelli - The Money Fi$h - Cox Productions; Pete Hickok - Rio Hondo - Theatre Of Note; Michael Navarro - My Mañana Comes - Fountain Theatre	**Tom Buderwitz - Casa Valentina - Pasadena Playhouse**; John Iacovelli - Endgame - Center Theatre Group; Mark Wendland - Barcelona - Geffen Playhouse; Derek Mclane - Big Sky - Geffen Playhouse; Tom Buderwitz - Guards At The Taj - Geffen Playhouse; Mike Billings - See Rock City - Rubicon Theatre Company; Jeff Cowie - The City Of Conversation- Wallis Annenberg Center For The Performing Arts
Sound Design (Intimate Theater)	Sound Design (Large Theater)
**John Nobori - The Golden Dragon - The Theatre @ Boston Court**; John Nobori - Colony Collapse - The Theatre @ Boston Court; Joseph Calarco - The Sparrow - Coeurage Theatre Company; Randy Tico - Ameryka - Critical Mass Performance Group; Christopher Moscatiello - The Hairy Ape - Odyssey Theatre Ensemble; David B. Marling - Birder - The Road Theatre Company; Matt Richter - A Gulag Mouse - Sacred Fools Theater Company	**Drew Dalzell & Noelle Hoffman - Wicked Lit 2015 - Unbound Productions**; Cricket Myers - Endgame - Center Theatre Group; Vincent Olivieri - Barcelona - Geffen Playhouse; Vincent Olivieri - Guards At The Taj - Geffen Playhouse; Philip Allen - Empire - La Mirada Theatre For The Performing Arts; Cricket Myers - I Only Have Eyes For You - The Al Dubin Musical/corky Hale; Bruno Louchouarn - Mojada: A Medea In Los Angeles - The Getty Villa & The Theatre @ Boston Court
Costume Design (Intimate Theater)	Costume Design (Large Theater)
**Michael Mullen - The Boy From Oz - Celebration Theatre**; Kerry Hennessy & Lori Meeker - Wood Boy Dog Fish - Bootleg Theater & Rogue Artists Ensemble; Allison Dillard - Bootycandy - Celebration Theatre; Lena Sands & Sarah Brown - Ameryka - Critical Mass Performance Group; Halei Parker - The Hairy Ape - Odyssey Theatre Ensemble; Candice Cain - The Glass Menagerie - Sierra Madre Playhouse; A. Jeffrey Schoenberg - Cloud 9 - The Antaeus Company	**Christine Cover Ferro - Wicked Lit 2015 - Unbound Productions**; Maggie Morgan - Endgame - Center Theatre Group; Ann Closs-Farley - Women Laughing Alone With Salad - Center Theatre Group; Denitsa Bliznakova - Guards At The Taj - Geffen Playhouse; Jessica Ford - These Paper Bullets! A Modish Ripoff Of William Shakespeare’s Much Ado About Nothing - Geffen Playhouse; Kate Bergh - Casa Valentina - Pasadena Playhouse; Vicki Conrad - The Imaginary Invalid - Will Geer's Theatricum Botanicum

== Ovation Honors ==
Ovation Honors recognize outstanding achievement in areas that are not among the standard list of nomination categories.

- Composition for a Play – Gregory Nabours - The Sparrow - Coeurage Theatre Company
- Fight Choreography – Edgar Landa - That Pretty Pretty; Or, The Rape Play - Son Of Semele Ensemble
- Puppet Design – Greg Ballora, Sean Cawelti, Christine Papalexis, Jack Pullman, Brian White - Wood Boy Dog Fish - Bootleg Theater & Rogue Artists Ensemble
