= Tryst (play) =

Tryst is a romantic play set in Edwardian London written by British playwright Karoline Leach. Tryst had its debut on April 6, 2006 at the Promenade Theatre in New York.

Tryst has been described as a "subversion of Edwardian melodrama", in which the stereotypical actions and responses of the characters are used to ask usually unasked questions about the motivations and power-relationships of the characters.

The 2006 off-Broadway premiere starred Maxwell Caulfield and Amelia Campbell.

The play was then produced in 2007 at the Black Dahlia Theater in Los Angeles, starring Gabriel Olds and Deborah Puette. The play got positive reviews, and was nominated for an Ovation for Best Production, Intimate Theater. Its director, Robin Larsen, was also nominated for an Ovation Award and won the Garland Award for Best Director. Olds received 6 nominations for Best Actor, and 2 wins: an LA Weekly Theater Award and one from the LADCC. Puette received Best Lead Actress nominations from the Ovations, Los Angeles Drama Critics Circle, and Garland Awards and was awarded the LA Weekly Award. Since then the play has been produced in numerous venues around the world, including the Westport Country Playhouse in 2008, and at the Irish Repertory Theatre in New York City in 2011.
