= Saleem (playwright) =

American dramatist

- Born: Saleem Azzouqa; Riyadh, Saudi Arabia
- Education: Colorado State University (MBA)
- Occupations: playwright, actor, DJ, and dancer
- Awards: 1996 GLAAD Harvey Fierstein Award for Best Original Writing

Saleem (Saleem Azzouqa) is a Palestinian-American gay Muslim playwright, actor, DJ, and dancer.

== Biography ==
Saleem was born and raised in Riyadh, Saudi Arabia, finished college in Dhahran (graduating in business in 1984), moved to the United States in 1985. There he earned an MBA at Colorado State University, and he has since lived in Los Angeles and San Francisco, California, in the United States.

Saleem was the recipient of a 1996 GLAAD Harvey Fierstein Award for Best Original Writing for his semi-autobiographical play Salam Shalom: A Tale Of Passion, a two-act love story. As a dancer, Saleem developed his own style which incorporates belly dancing, gypsy movements, flamenco and jazz to produce what he calls "free style belly dancing".

In 2010, referring to the Palestinian-Israeli conflict, he said: "I think things will change and will change for the worse. It doesn’t look good."
