= 2012 Ovation Awards =

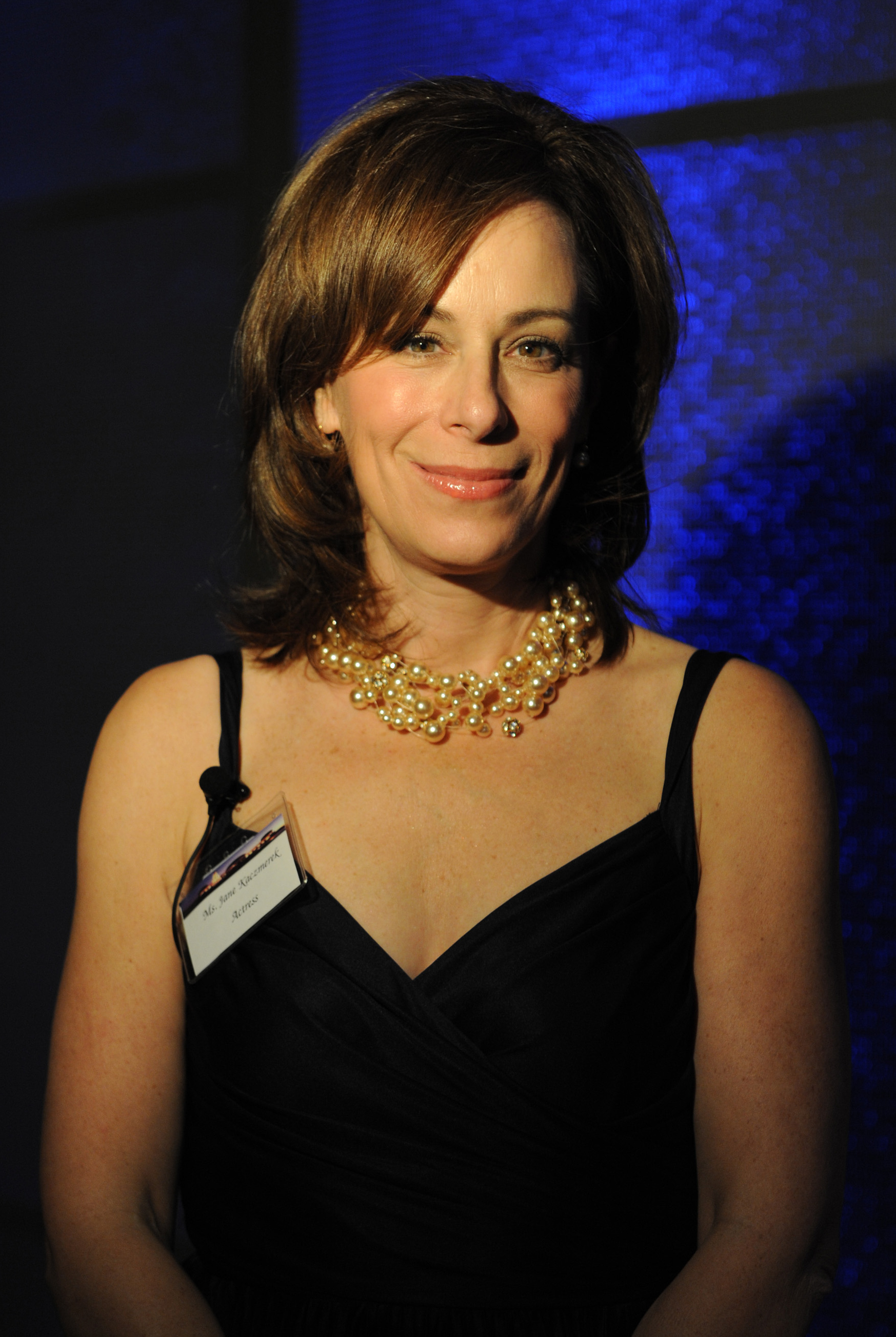
Jane Kaczmarek, Ceremony co-host and nominee, Lead Actress in a Play

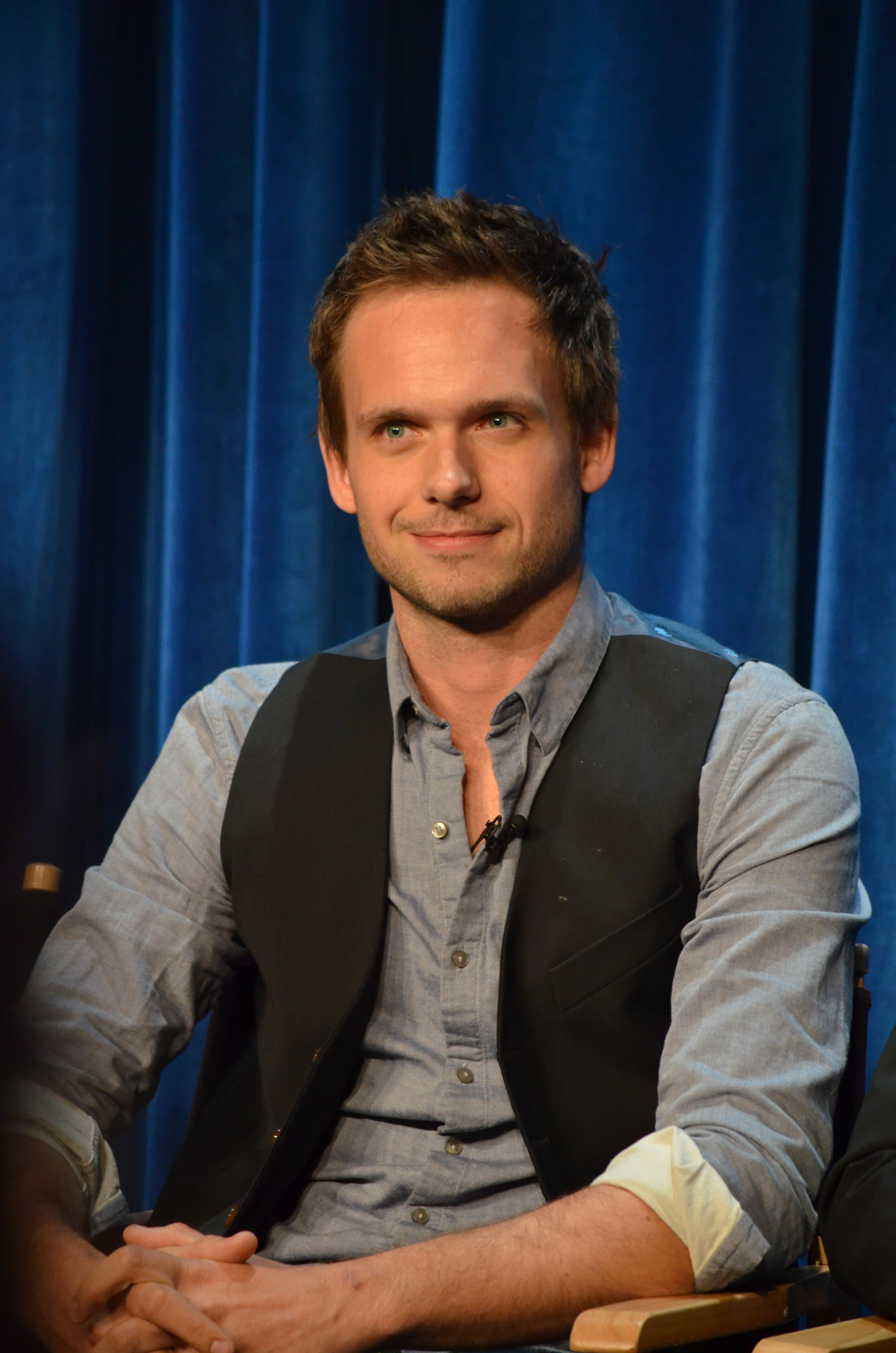
Patrick J. Adams, nominee, Lead Actor in a Play

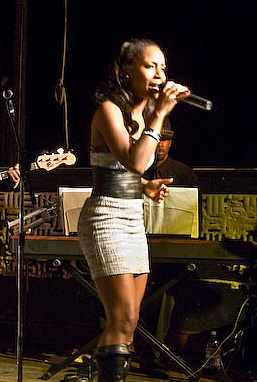
LaToya London, winner, Featured Actress in a Musical

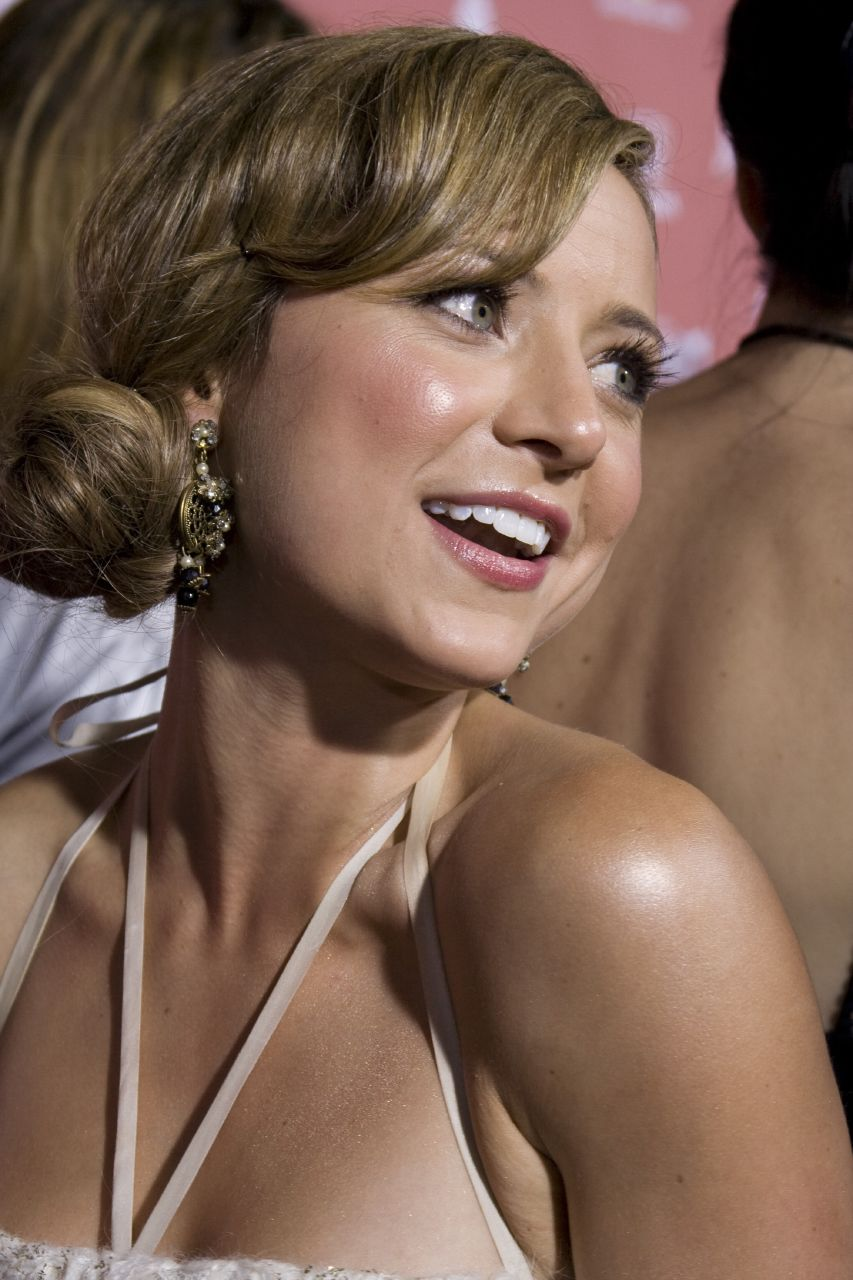
Christine Lakin, nominee, Featured Actress in a Musical

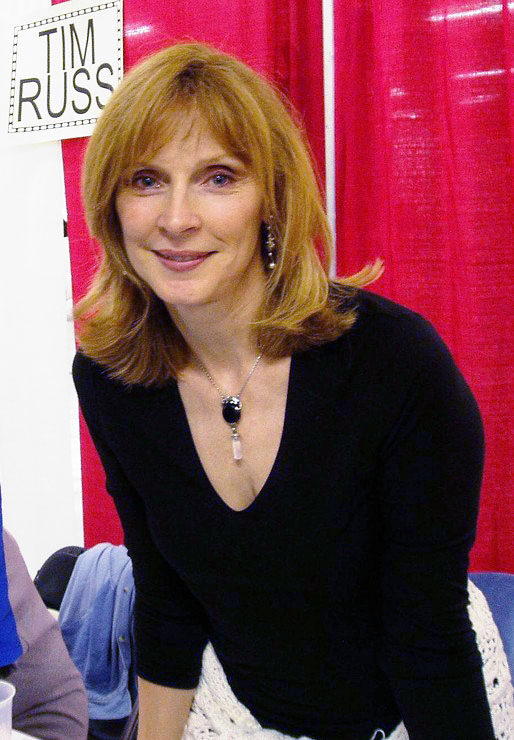
Gates McFadden, nominee, Director of a Play

The nominees for the 2012 Ovation Awards were announced on September 11, 2012, at the L.A. Gay & Lesbian Center in Hollywood, California. The awards were presented for excellence in stage productions in the Los Angeles area from September 1, 2011 to August 28, 2012 based upon evaluations from 250 members of the Los Angeles theater community.

The winners were announced on November 12, 2012 in a ceremony at the Los Angeles Theatre in Downtown Los Angeles. The ceremony was co-hosted by actress Jane Kaczmarek and Herbert Siguenza, co-founder of the performance troupe Culture Clash.

== Awards ==
Winners are listed first and highlighted in boldface.

Best Production of a Musical (Intimate Theater)	Best Production of a Musical (Large Theater)
**The Color Purple: A Musical – Celebration Theatre**; Hey, Morgan! – Black Dahlia Theatre; Spring Awakening – Over The Moon Productions	**Forbidden Broadway: Greatest Hits, Volume 2 – Musical Theatre West**; Avenue Q – 3-D Theatricals; Miss Saigon – McCoy Rigby Entertainment and La Mirada Theatre for the Performing Arts; Hairspray – Musical Theatre West; Two Gentlemen Of Chicago – Troubadour Theater Company
Best Production of a Play (Intimate Theater)	Best Production of a Play (Large Theater)
**Peace In Our Time – Antaeus Theatre Company**; Nine Circles – Bootleg Theater; What‘s Wrong With Angry? – Celebration Theatre; The Elephant Man – Mechanicals Theatre Group; All My Sons – The Matrix Theatre Company; Couples Counseling Killed Katie – Ugly Dog Productions and Elephant Theatre Company; Santasia: A Holiday Comedy – Whitefire Theatre	**Waiting For Godot – Center Theatre Group: Mark Taper Forum**; The Convert – Center Theatre Group: Kirk Douglas Theatre; Good People – Geffen Playhouse; A Wrinkle In Time – Mainstreet Theatre Company; The Mystery of Irma Vep – Rubicon Theatre Company
Best Presented Production	Best Season
**War Horse – Center Theatre Group: Ahmanson Theatre**; Follies – Center Theatre Group: Ahmanson Theatre; Red – Center Theatre Group: Mark Taper Forum	**Center Theatre Group**; Geffen Playhouse; McCoy Rigby Entertainment and La Mirada Theatre for the Performing Arts; Musical Theatre West; The Colony Theatre Company
Lead Actor in a Musical	Lead Actress in a Musical
**Davis Gaines as Cervantes/Quixote – Man of La Mancha – Musical Theatre West**; Adam Shapiro as Joe/Swing – Hey, Morgan! – Black Dahlia Theatre; Michael A. Shepperd as Mister – The Color Purple: A Musical – Celebration Theatre; Joseph Foronda as The Engineer – Miss Saigon – McCoy Rigby Entertainment and La Mirada Theatre for the Performing Arts; David Engel as Man 2 – Forbidden Broadway: Greatest Hits, Volume 2 – Musical Theatre West; Larry Raben as Man 1 – Forbidden Broadway: Greatest Hits, Volume 2 – Musical Theatre West; Gary Patent as Haskell – The Immigrant – West Coast Jewish Theatre	**Susanne Blakeslee as Woman 1 – Forbidden Broadway: Greatest Hits, Volume 2 – Musical Theatre West**; Meagan English as Mrs. Farkas/Jen/Jackie/Black Pants Girl – Hey, Morgan! – Black Dahlia Theatre; Bets Malone as Princess Winnifred – Once Upon a Mattress – Cabrillo Music Theatre; Cesili Williams as Celie – The Color Purple: A Musical – Celebration Theatre; Valerie Fagan as Woman 2 – Forbidden Broadway: Greatest Hits, Volume 2 – Musical Theatre West; Lesli Margherita as Aldonza – Man of La Mancha – Musical Theatre West; Tami Tappan Damiano as The Lady Of The Lake – Spamalot – Musical Theatre West
Lead Actor in a Play	Lead Actress in a Play
**Alan Mandell as Estragon – Waiting For Godot – Center Theatre Group: Mark Taper Forum**; Patrick J. Adams as Reeves – Nine Circles – Bootleg Theater; Barry McGovern as Vladimir – Waiting For Godot – Center Theatre Group: Mark Taper Forum; Troy Kotsur as Cyrano – Cyrano – Fountain Theatre and Deaf West Theatre Company; Jon Jon Briones as Mango – The Romance of Magno Rubio – John Anson Ford Theatre; Jamie Torcellini as Nicodemus/Lady Enid/Alcazar/An Intruder – The Mystery of Irma Vep – Rubicon Theatre Company; Steve Hofvendahl – Peace In Our Time – The Antaeus Company	**Pascale Armand as Jekesai/Ester – The Convert – Center Theatre Group: Kirk Douglas Theatre**; Jacqueline Wright as Jon Benét – House Of Gold – Ensemble Studio Theatre-LA; Jane Kaczmarek as Margie – Good People – Geffen Playhouse; Anne Gee Byrd as Mary – The Savannah Disputation – The Colony Theatre Company; Ellen Lauren as Hecuba – Trojen Women (After Euripides) – The J. Paul Getty Trust; Anne Gee Byrd as Kate Keller – All My Sons – The Matrix Theatre Company; Jessica Tuck as Actress – Couples Counseling Killed Katie – Ugly Dog Productions and Elephant Theatre Company
Featured Actor in a Musical	Featured Actress in a Musical
**Todrick Hall as Seaweed J. Stubbs – Hairspray – Musical Theatre West**; Nathan Danforth as Nicky/Trekkie/Bad Idea/Etc – Avenue Q – 3-D Theatricals; David Allen Jones as Prof. Marvel/Guard At The Gate/Wizard Of Oz – The Wizard of Oz – 3-D Theatricals; Terrance Spencer as Harpo – The Color Purple: A Musical – Celebration Theatre; Matt Walker as Ralphie – A Christmas Westside Story – Troubadour Theater Company; Rob Nagle as Valentine – Two Gentlemen Of Chicago – Troubadour Theater Company; Matt Walker as Proteus – Two Gentlemen Of Chicago – Troubadour Theater Company	**La Toya London as Shug Avery – The Color Purple: A Musical – Celebration Theatre**; Tracy Lore as Queen Aggravain – Once Upon a Mattress – Cabrillo Music Theatre; Kelly Jenrette as Nettie – The Color Purple: A Musical – Celebration Theatre; Constance Jewell Lopez as Sofia – The Color Purple: A Musical – Celebration Theatre; Tracy Lore as Velma Von Tussle – Hairspray – Musical Theatre West; Beth Kennedy as Launce/Outlaw #3 – Two Gentlemen Of Chicago – Troubadour Theater Company; Christine Lakin as Julia – Two Gentlemen Of Chicago – Troubadour Theater Company
Featured Actor in a Play	Featured Actress in a Play
**Hugo Armstrong as Lucky – Waiting For Godot – Center Theatre Group: Mark Taper Forum**; Kevin Mambo as Chancellor – The Convert – Center Theatre Group: Kirk Douglas Theatre; Jonathan Cake as Frank – The Grönholm Method – Falcon Theatre; Stephen Spinella as Rick – The Grönholm Method – Falcon Theatre; Jemal McNeil as Henderson – Cages – LDG Productions LLC; Chris Butler as Caesar Wilks – Gem of the Ocean – Rubicon Theatre Company; Josh Clark as Father Murphy – The Savannah Disputation – The Colony Theatre Company	**Zainab Jah as Prudence – The Convert – Center Theatre Group: Kirk Douglas Theatre**; Kelly Schumann as Linda – What‘s Wrong With Angry? – Celebration Theatre; Cheryl Lynn Bruce as Mai Tamba – The Convert – Center Theatre Group: Kirk Douglas Theatre; Sara Botsford as Jean – Good People – Geffen Playhouse; Marylouise Burke as Dottie – Good People – Geffen Playhouse; Bonnie Bailey-Reed as Margaret – The Savannah Disputation – The Colony Theatre Company; Rebecca Mozo as Melissa – The Savannah Disputation – The Colony Theatre Company
Acting Ensemble of a Musical	Acting Ensemble for a Play
**The cast of The Color Purple: A Musical – Celebration Theatre**; The cast of Hey, Morgan! – Black Dahlia Theatre; The cast of Ring of Fire, the Music of Johnny Cash – Cabrillo Music Theatre; The cast of Forbidden Broadway: Greatest Hits, Volume 2 – Musical Theatre West; The cast of Spring Awakening – Over The Moon Productions	**The cast of Waiting For Godot – Center Theatre Group: Mark Taper Forum**; The cast of Nine Circles – Bootleg Theater; The cast of The Convert – Center Theatre Group: Kirk Douglas Theatre; The cast of The Grönholm Method – Falcon Theatre; The cast of Good People – Geffen Playhouse; The cast of The Jacksonian – Geffen Playhouse; The cast of The Savannah Disputation – The Colony Theatre Company
Director of a Musical	Director of a Play
**Michael Matthews – The Color Purple: A Musical – Celebration Theatre**; Matt Shakman – Hey, Morgan! – Black Dahlia Theatre; William Selby – Forbidden Broadway: Greatest Hits, Volume 2 – Musical Theatre West; Rick Sparks – I Love Lucy Live On Stage – Rockahn, LLC; Patrick Pearson – Rooms: A Rock Romance – The Chance Theater	**Emily Mann – The Convert – Center Theatre Group: Kirk Douglas Theatre**; Michael Matthews – What‘s Wrong With Angry? – Celebration Theatre; Michael Arabian – Waiting For Godot – Center Theatre Group: Mark Taper Forum; Gates McFadden – House Of Gold – Ensemble Studio Theatre-LA; Matt Shakman – Good People – Geffen Playhouse; Neil Patrick Stewart – The Elephant Man – Mechanicals Theatre Group; Jenny Sullivan – The Mystery of Irma Vep – Rubicon Theatre Company
Music Direction	Choreography
**Gregory Nabours – The Color Purple: A Musical – Celebration Theatre**; David Richman – Hey, Morgan! – Black Dahlia Theatre; Jeff Lisenby – Ring of Fire, the Music of Johnny Cash – Cabrillo Music Theatre; Matthew Smedal – Forbidden Broadway: Greatest Hits, Volume 2 – Musical Theatre West; Rachael Lawrence – Spring Awakening – Over The Moon Productions; Eric Heinly – A Christmas Westside Story – Troubadour Theater Company; Eric Heinly – Two Gentlemen Of Chicago – Troubadour Theater Company	**Janet Roston – The Color Purple: A Musical – Celebration Theatre**; Lili Fuller, Matthew Krumpe, Adam North, Joe Sofranko & Juliana Tyson – Stations: A Los Angeles Holiday Story – Ensemble Theatre Company & Boom Kat Dance Theatre; Dana Solimando – Miss Saigon – McCoy Rigby Entertainment and La Mirada Theatre for the Performing Arts; Lee Martino – Hello! My Baby – Rubicon Theatre Company; Lisa Hopkins – Dames at Sea – The Colony Theatre Company; Tina Kronis – The Treatment – The Theatre @ Boston Court; Molly Alvarez – A Christmas Westside Story – Troubadour Theater Company
Book for an Original Musical	Lyrics/Music for an Original Musical
**Isaac Laskin and Matt Fogel – Hey, Morgan! – Black Dahlia Theatre**; Parmer Fuller – Stations: A Los Angeles Holiday Story – Ensemble Theatre Company & Boom Kat Dance Theatre; Cheri Steinkellner – Hello! My Baby – Rubicon Theatre Company	**Parmer Fuller and Michael Kramer – Stations: A Los Angeles Holiday Story – Ensemble Theatre Company & Boom Kat Dance Theatre**; Matthew Fogel, Isaac Laskin, And David Richman – Hey, Morgan! – Black Dahlia Theatre; Masato Baba – The Brahmin and the Tiger – Company Of Angels & Hereandnow Theatre Company
Playwrighting For An Original Play	
**Andrew Dolan – The Many Mistresses Of Martin Luther King Ensemble Studio Theatre-LA**; Lisa Loomer – Café Vida – Cornerstone Theater Company; Stephen Sachs – Cyrano – Fountain Theatre and Deaf West Theatre Company; Keith Stevenson – Out There on Fried Meat Ridge Rd. – Pacific Resident Theatre; Christina Hart – Birds of a Feather – The Complex; Evelina Fernandez – Hope: Part II of a Mexican Trilogy – The Los Angeles Theatre Center; Johnny O‘Callaghan – Who‘s Your Daddy? – The Victory Theatre Center	
Lighting Design (Intimate Theater)	Lighting Design (Large Theater)
**Luke Moyer – Deathtrap – L.A. Gay & Lesbian Center**; Timothy Swiss – The Color Purple: A Musical – Celebration Theatre; Jeremy Pivnick – The King of the Desert – Coactive Content LLC; Hilda Kane – The Elephant Man – Mechanicals Theatre Group; Brandon Baruch – Spring Awakening – Over The Moon Productions; Jeremy Pivnick – Peace In Our Time – The Antaeus Company; Jaymi Smith – The Children – The Theatre @ Boston Court	**Lap Chi Chu – The Convert – Center Theatre Group: Kirk Douglas Theatre**; Jean-Yves Tessier – Ring of Fire, the Music of Johnny Cash – Cabrillo Music Theatre; David Weiner – American Night: The Ballad Of Juan Jose – Center Theatre Group: Kirk Douglas Theatre; Geoff Korf – The Night Watcher – Center Theatre Group: Kirk Douglas Theatre; Brian Gale – Waiting For Godot – Center Theatre Group: Mark Taper Forum; Elizabeth Harper – Good People – Geffen Playhouse; Steven Young – Miss Saigon – McCoy Rigby Entertainment and La Mirada Theatre for the Performing Arts; Brian Gale – A Wrinkle In Time – Mainstreet Theatre Company
Scenic Design (Intimate Theater)	Scenic Design (Large Theater)
**Tom Buderwitz – Peace In Our Time – The Antaeus Company**; Tom Buderwitz – Slow Dance In Midtown – Bella Vita Entertainment; Tom Buderwitz – The Many Mistresses Of Martin Luther King – Ensemble Studio Theatre-LA; Joel Daavid – Deathtrap – L.A. Gay & Lesbian Center; Haley Ho – The Elephant Man – Mechanicals Theatre Group; Desma Murphy – The Water‘s Edge – Road Theatre Company; Joe Holbrook – Rooms: A Rock Romance – The Chance Theater	**Daniel Ostling – The Convert – Center Theatre Group: Kirk Douglas Theatre**; John Lee Beatty – Poor Behavior – Center Theatre Group: Mark Taper Forum; John Iacovelli – Waiting For Godot – Center Theatre Group: Mark Taper Forum; Craig Siebels – Good People – Geffen Playhouse; Tom Buderwitz – Honus & Me – Mainstreet Theatre Company; John Iacovelli – The Heiress – Pasadena Playhouse; Stephen Gifford – Old Wicked Songs – The Colony Theatre Company
Sound Design (Intimate Theater)	Sound Design (Large Theater)
**Veronika Vorel and John Zalewski – The Children – The Theatre @ Boston Court**; Ken Sawyer – Deathtrap – L.A. Gay & Lesbian Center; Joseph Slawinski – Eternal Thou – McCray Productions; David Marling – The Water‘s Edge – Road Theatre Company; John Zalewski – Peace In Our Time – The Antaeus Company; Martin Carrillo – Have You Seen Alice? – Theatre Of NOTE; Bill Froggatt – Wicked Lit 2011 – Unbound Productions	**John Zalewski – A Wrinkle In Time – Mainstreet Theatre Company**; Darron L. West – American Night: The Ballad Of Juan Jose – Center Theatre Group: Kirk Douglas Theatre; Darron L. West – The Convert – Center Theatre Group: Kirk Douglas Theatre; Joe Sofranko – Stations: A Los Angeles Holiday Story – Ensemble Theatre Company And Boom Kat Dance Theatre; Jon Gottlieb – Radiance: The Passion Of Marie Curie – Geffen Playhouse; Erik Carstensen – The Pianist Of Willesden Lane – Geffen Playhouse; David Beaudry – The Mystery of Irma Vep – Rubicon Theatre Company; Drew Dalzell – Old Wicked Songs – The Colony Theatre Company
Costume Design (Intimate Theater)	Costume Design (Large Theater)
**Shon Leblanc – I Love Lucy Live On Stage – Rockahn, LLC**; Vicki Conrad – The Learned Ladies – Actors Co-Op Theatre Company; Naila Aladdin Sanders – The Color Purple: A Musical – Celebration Theatre; Jessica Olson – Stoneface: The Rise and Fall and Rise of Buster Keaton – Sacred Fools Theater Company; Ashley Hayes – Dolls! Not Your Usual Love Story – Santa Monica Playhouse; Jessica Olson – Peace In Our Time – The Antaeus Company; Marcy Froehlich – All My Sons – The Matrix Theatre Company	**Paul Tazewell – The Convert – Center Theatre Group: Kirk Douglas Theatre**; Angela Calin – The Bungler – A Noise Within; Esosa – American Night: The Ballad Of Juan Jose – Center Theatre Group: Kirk Douglas Theatre; Christopher Acebo – Waiting For Godot – Center Theatre Group: Mark Taper Forum; Kim Deshazo – Southern Comforts – Falcon Theatre; Alvin Colt – Forbidden Broadway: Greatest Hits, Volume 2 – Musical Theatre West; Leah Piehl – The Heiress – Pasadena Playhouse

== Ovation Honors ==
Ovation Honors, which recognize outstanding achievement in areas that are not among the standard list of nomination categories, were presented when the nominations were announced.

- Composition for a Play – Ryan Johnson – Stoneface: The Rise and Fall and Rise of Buster Keaton – Sacred Fools Theater Company
- Fight Choreography – Andrew Amani – Hearts Like Fists – Theatre Of NOTE
- Puppet Design – Susan Gratch – The Children – The Theatre @ Boston Court
- Video Design – Brian Gale – Waiting For Godot – Center Theatre Group: Mark Taper Forum
- Certificate of Achievement in Video Design – Shawn Sagady – American Night: The Ballad Of Juan Jose – Center Theatre Group: Kirk Douglas Theatre
