= 2009 Ovation Awards =

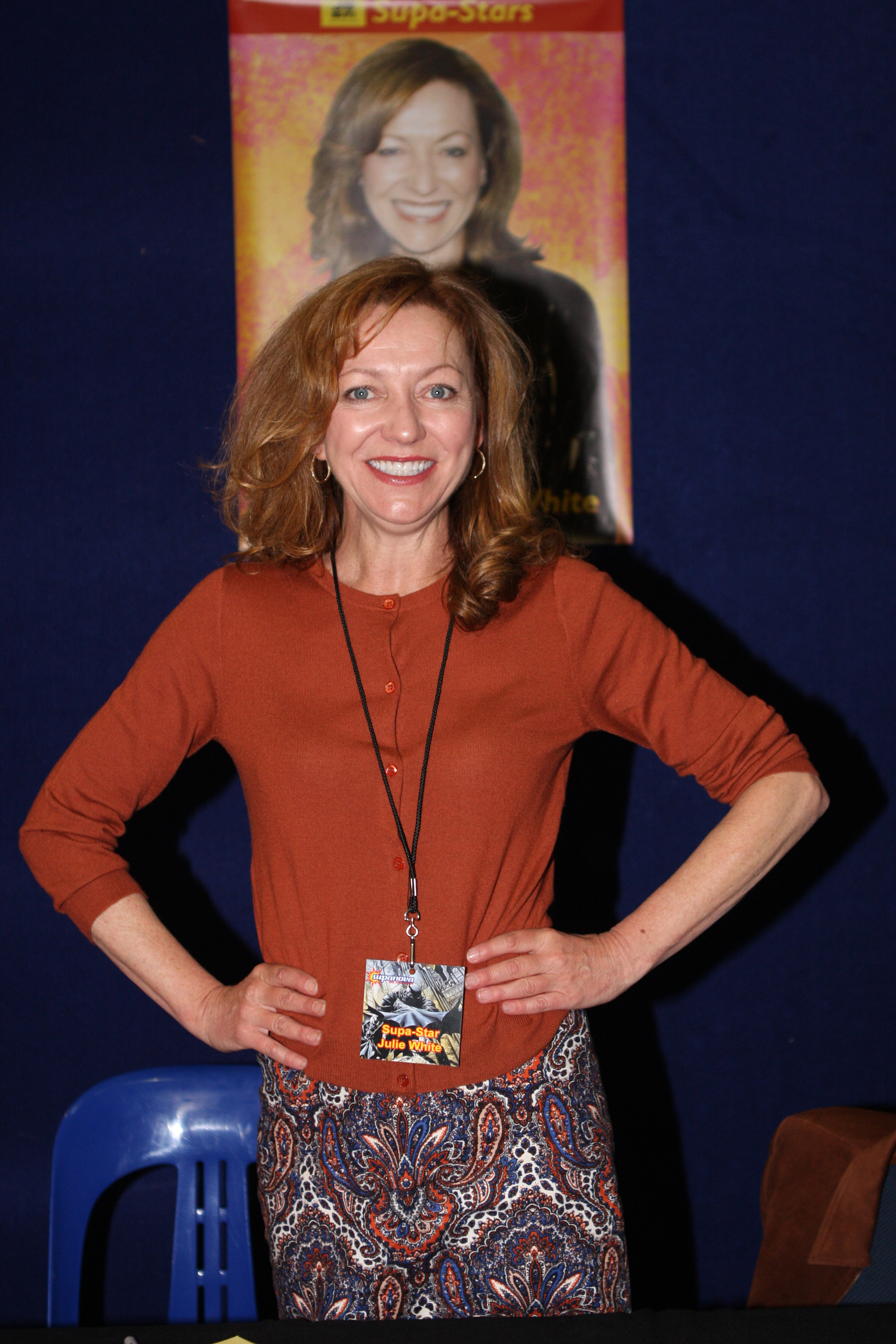
Julie White, winner, Lead Actress in a Play

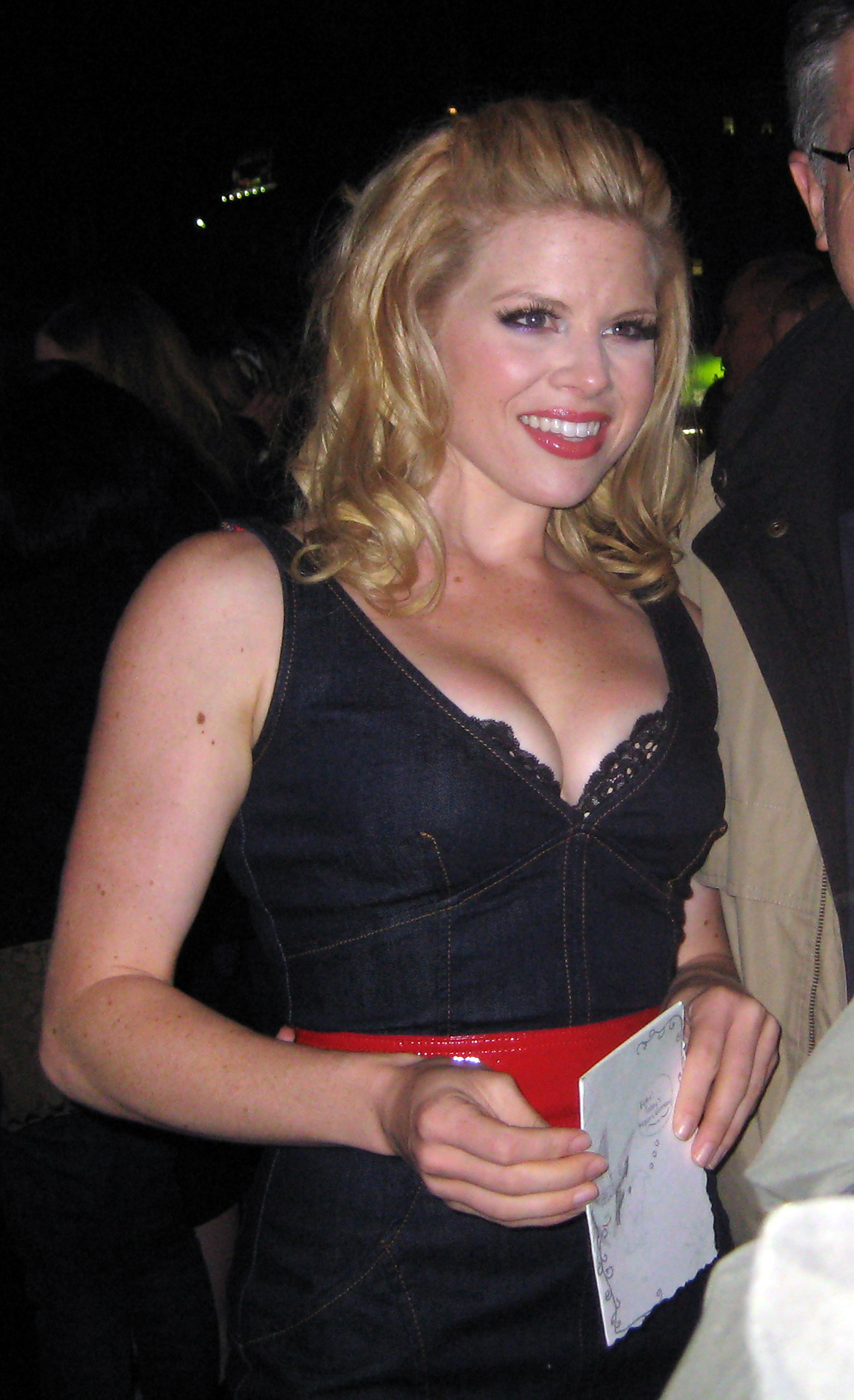
Megan Hilty, nominee, Lead Actress in a Musical

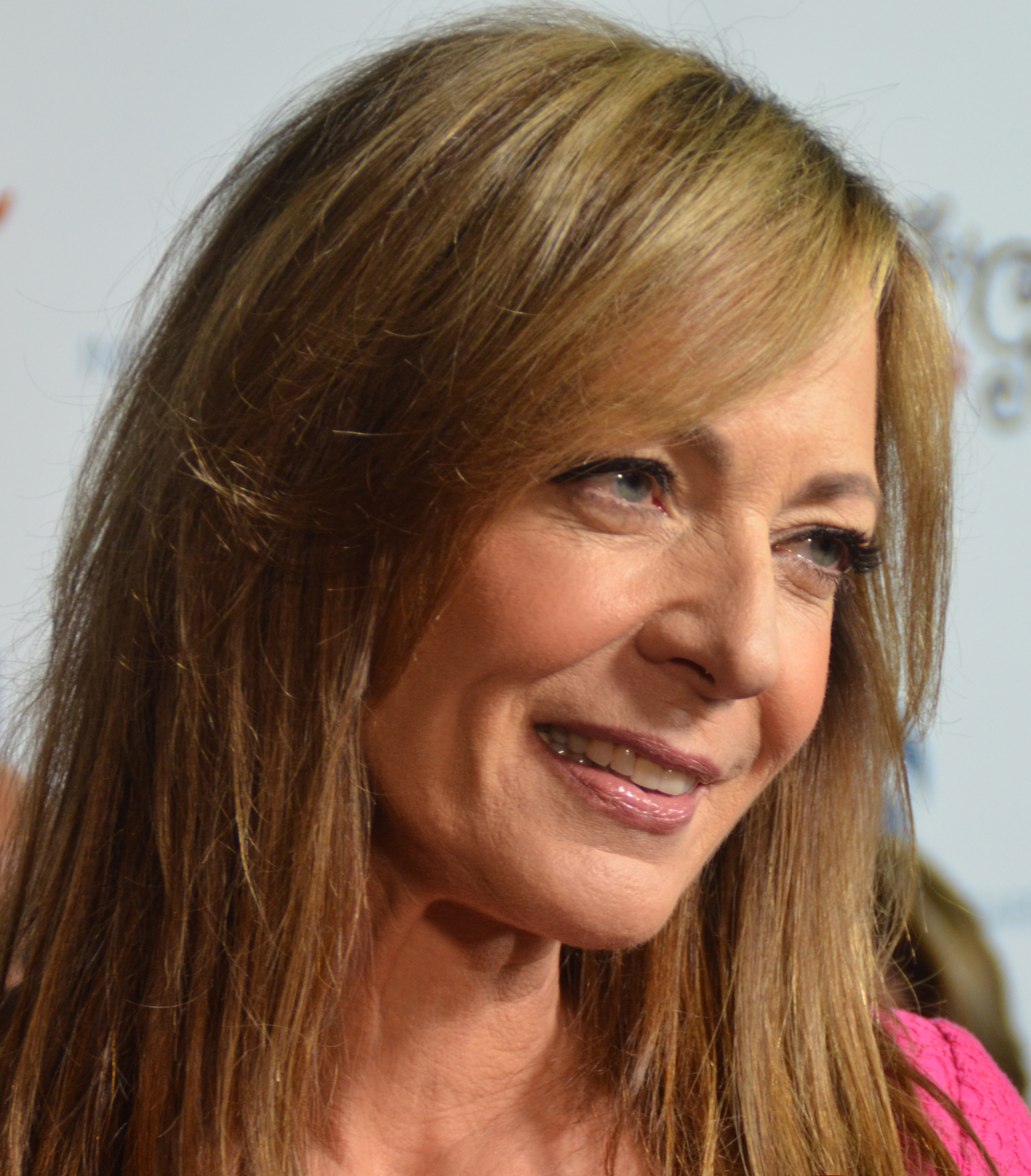
Allison Janney, nominee, Lead Actress in a Musical

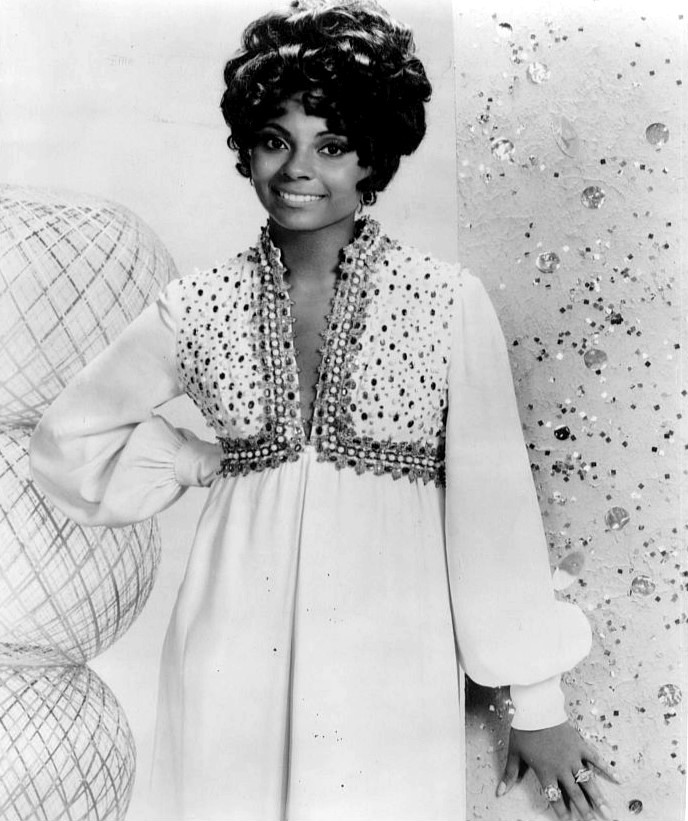
Leslie Uggams, nominee, Lead Actress in a Musical

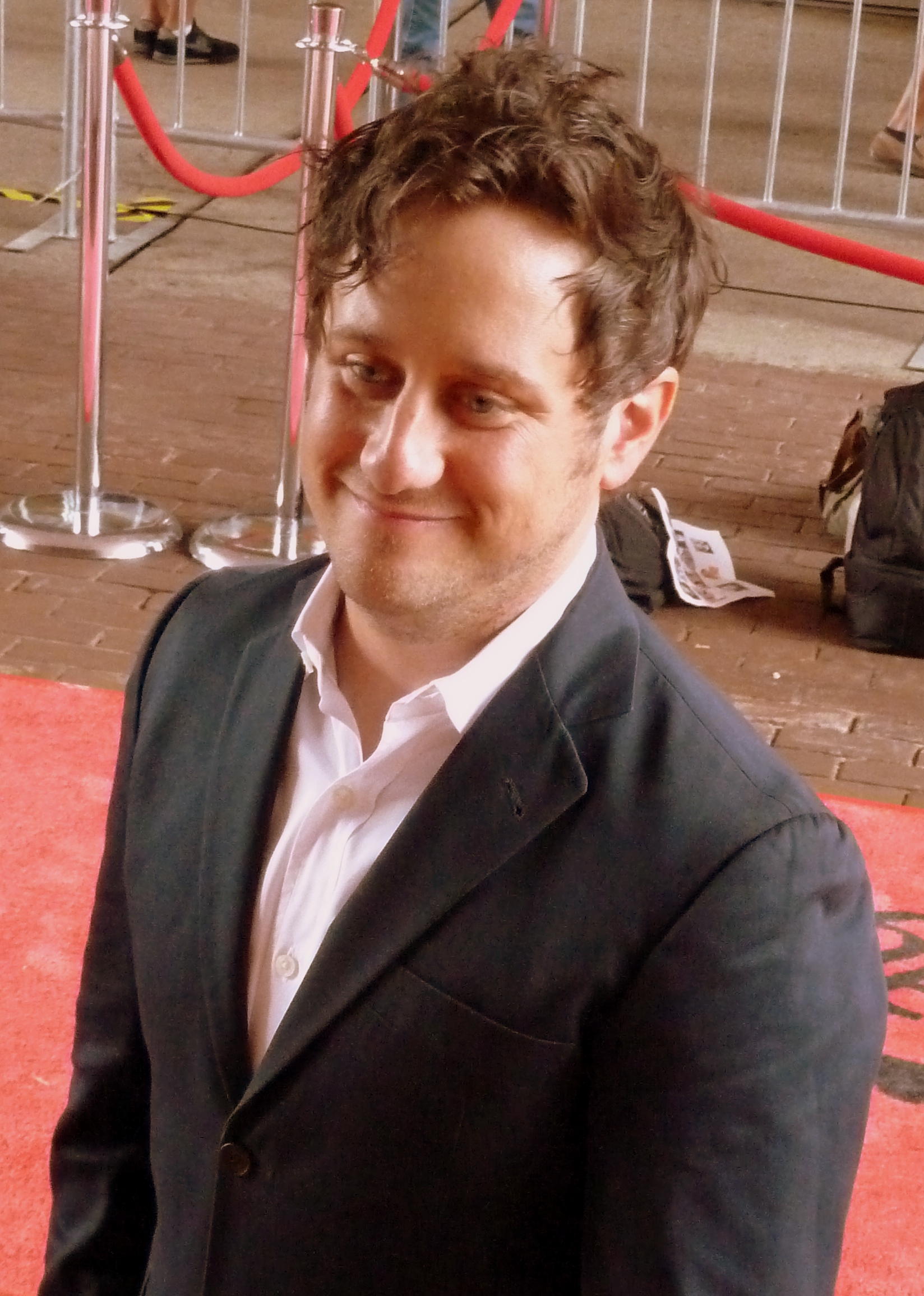
Christopher Fitzgerald, nominee, Lead Actor in a Musical

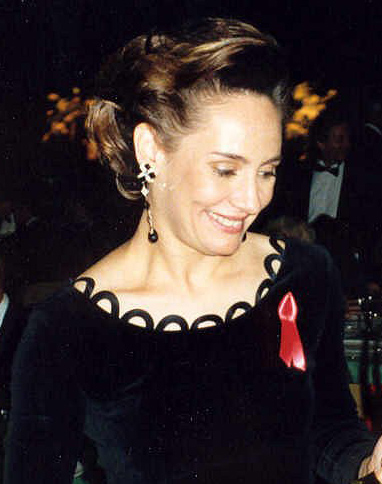
Laurie Metcalf, nominee, Lead Actress in a Play

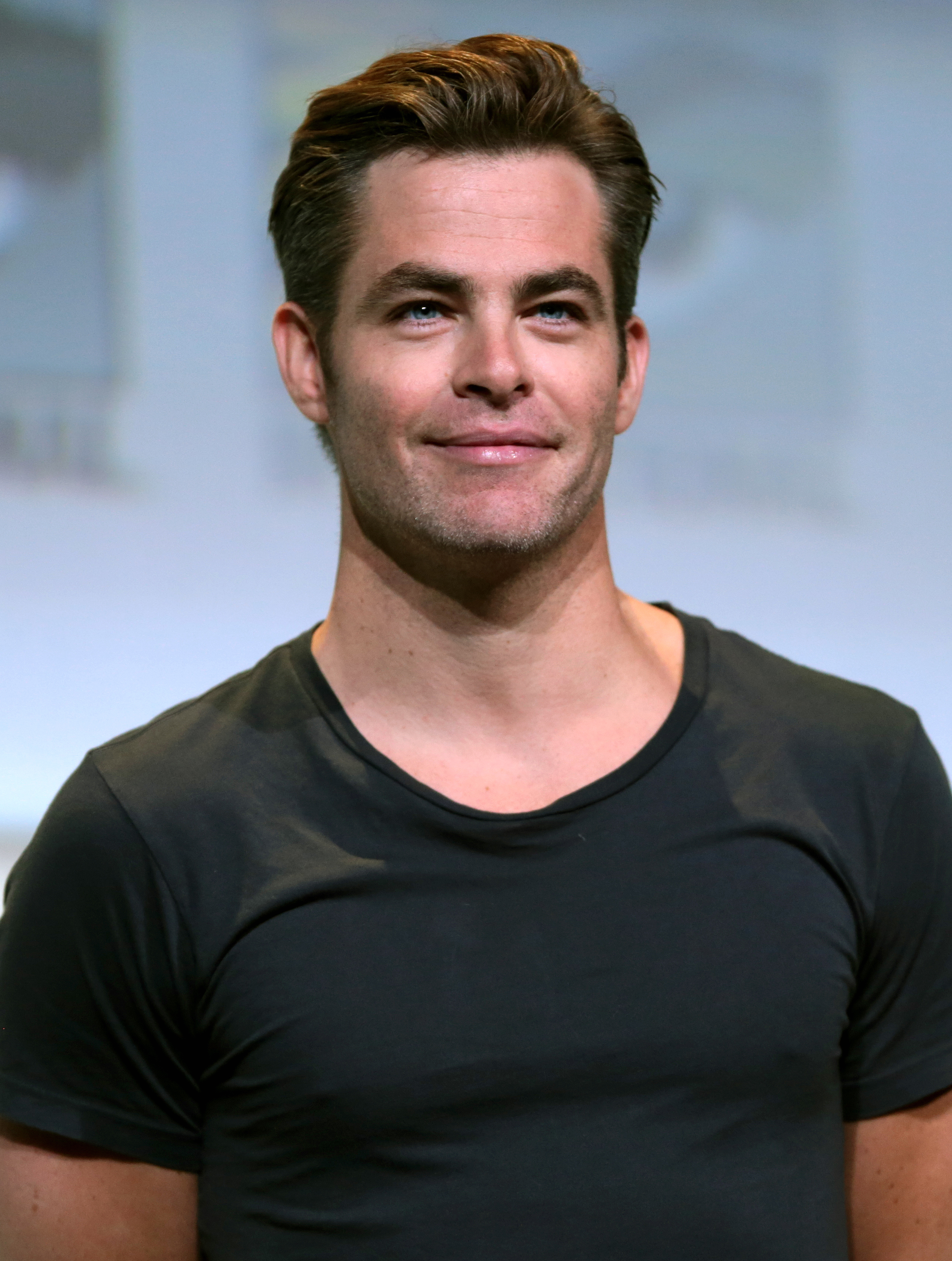
Chris Pine, nominee, Lead Actor in a Play

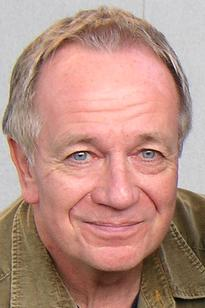
Sam Anderson, nominee, Lead Actor in a Play

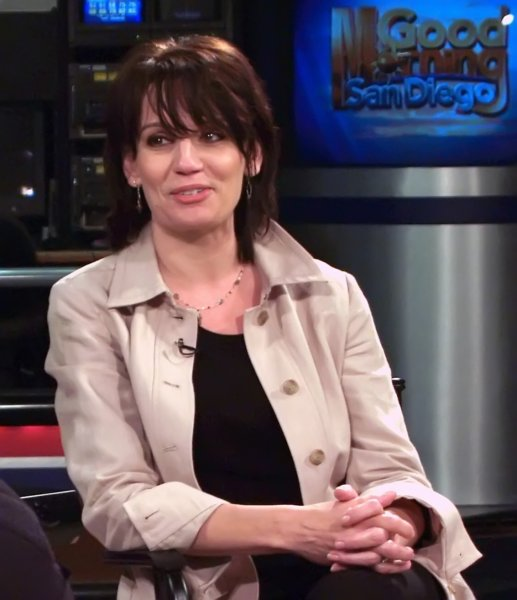
Beth Leavel, nominee, Featured Actress in a Musical

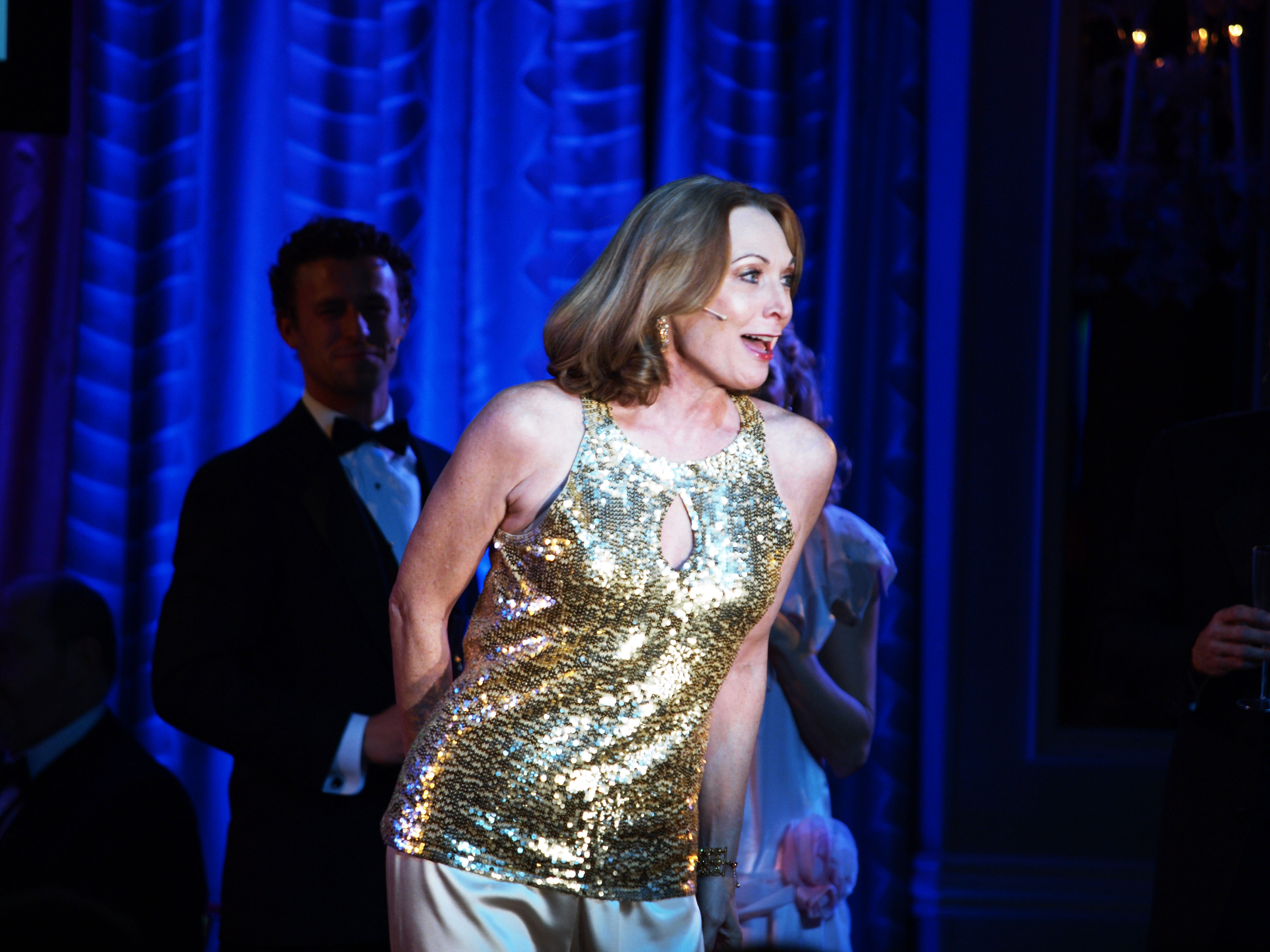
Dee Hoty, nominee, Featured Actress in a Musical

The nominees for the 2009 Ovation Awards were announced on October 19, 2009, at A Noise Within in Glendale, California. The awards were presented for excellence in stage productions in the Los Angeles area from September 1, 2008, to August 31, 2009, based upon evaluations from members of the Los Angeles theater community.

The winners were announced on January 11, 2010, in a ceremony at the Redondo Beach Performing Arts Center in Redondo Beach, California.

== Awards ==
Winners are listed first and highlighted in boldface.

Best Production of a Musical (Intimate Theater)	Best Production of a Musical (Large Theater)
**Kiss of the Spider Woman – The Musical – Havok Theatre Company**; Divorce! The Musical – Rick Culbertson, in association with Lynn Marks and Paradox Entertainment; HAIR: The American Tribal Love-Rock Musical – The Chance Theater; Joe's Garage – Open Fist Theatre Company; Life Could Be a Dream – David Elzer, Peter Schneider & Crooning Crabcakes LLC	**Louis & Keely, Live at the Sahara – Geffen Playhouse**; Alice in One Hit Wonderland 2: Through the Looking Glass – Troubadour Theater Company; As U2 Like It – Troubadour Theater Company; Smokey Joe's Cafe – El Portal Theatre in association with Corky Hale; The Last Five Years – East West Players
Best Production of a Play (Intimate Theater)	Best Production of a Play (Large Theater)
**Family Planning – Chalk Repertory Theatre**; A Skull in Connemara – Theatre Tribe; Coming Home – Fountain Theatre; Equus – The Production Company; Photograph 51 – Fountain Theatre; Stick Fly – The Matrix Theatre Company; The Idea Man – Elephant Theatre Company	**Two Trains Running – Ebony Repertory Theatre**; Farragut North – Geffen Playhouse; Lydia – Center Theatre Group: Mark Taper Forum; The Little Dog Laughed – Center Theatre Group: Kirk Douglas Theatre; The Rehearsal – A Noise Within
Best Season	Acting Ensemble
**Troubadour Theater Company**; Fountain Theatre; Geffen Playhouse; Rubicon Theatre Company; The Chance Theater	**The cast of Stick Fly – The Matrix Theatre Company**; The cast of Alice in One Hit Wonderland 2: Through the Looking Glass – Troubadour Theater Company; The cast of As U2 Like It – Troubadour Theater Company; The cast of Divorce! The Musical – Rick Culbertson, in association with Lynn Marks and Paradox Entertainment; The cast of Forbidden Broadway: Greatest Hits Volume 1 – Musical Theatre West; The cast of Mercury Fur – needtheater; The cast of Model Behavior, i.e., the Strange Case of Dr. Jekyll and Mr. Hyde – 24th Street Theatre
Lead Actor in a Musical	Lead Actress in a Musical
**Jake Broder as Louis Prima – Louis & Keely, Live at the Sahara – Geffen Playhouse**; Hershey Felder as Ludwig van Beethoven – Beethoven As I Knew Him – Geffen Playhouse; Will Collyer as Josh – BIG: The Musical – West Coast Ensemble; Eric Kunze as Jesus – Jesus Christ Superstar – Civic Light Opera of South Bay Cities; Chad Borden as Molina – Kiss of the Spider Woman – The Musical – Havok Theatre Company; Christopher Fitzgerald as Billy Minsky – Minsky's – Center Theatre Group: Ahmanson Theatre; Michael K. Lee as Jamie – The Last Five Years – East West Players	**Vanessa Claire Smith as Keely Smith – Louis & Keely, Live at the Sahara – Geffen Playhouse**; Megan Hilty as Doralee Rhodes – 9 to 5: The Musical – Center Theatre Group: Ahmanson Theatre; Allison Janney as Violet Newstead – 9 to 5: The Musical – Center Theatre Group: Ahmanson Theatre; Katrina Lenk as Linda Lovelace – Lovelace A Rock Opera – The Hayworth; Leslie Uggams as Lena Horne – Stormy Weather – Pasadena Playhouse; Lillias White as Lillias – The Best is Yet to Come: The Music of Cy Coleman – Rubicon Theatre Company; Jennifer Paz as Cathy – The Last Five Years – East West Players
Lead Actor in a Play	Lead Actress in a Play
**Glynn Turman as Memphis – Two Trains Running – Ebony Repertory Theatre**; Morlan Higgins as Mick Dowd – A Skull in Connemara – Theatre Tribe; Sam R. Ross as Alan Turing – Breaking the Code – The Production Company; Chris Pine as Stephen Bellamy – Farragut North – Geffen Playhouse; Sam Anderson as Ichabod Banks – The Bird and Mr. Banks – Road Theatre Company; Matt Gottlieb as Gabriel Hornstein – Who Lives? – Renal Support Network; Joe Spano as George – Who's Afraid of Virginia Woolf? – Rubicon Theatre Company	**Julie White as Diane – The Little Dog Laughed – Center Theatre Group: Kirk Douglas Theatre**; Deidrie Henry as Veronica – Coming Home – Fountain Theatre; Alina Phelan as Olivia – Family Planning – Chalk Repertory Theatre; Aria Alpert as Rosalind Franklin – Photograph 51 – Fountain Theatre; Julia Fletcher as Anna – The Letters – Andak Stage Company; Laurie Metcalf as Virginia – Voice Lessons – Zephyr Theatre; Betty Garrett as Sarita Myrtle – Waiting in the Wings – Theatre West
Featured Actor in a Musical	Featured Actress in a Musical
**Michael Paternostro as Carmen Ghia – The Producers – Musical Theatre West**; Jim Holdridge as Eugene – Life Could Be a Dream – David Elzer, Peter Schneider & Crooning Crabcakes LLC; Niles Rivers as Niles – Smokey Joe's Cafe – El Portal Theatre in association with Corky Hale; TC Carson as TC – Smokey Joe's Cafe – El Portal Theatre in association with Corky Hale; John Woodard III as John – Smokey Joe's Cafe – El Portal Theatre in association with Corky Hale; Maceo Oliver as Maceo – Smokey Joe's Cafe – El Portal Theatre in association with Corky Hale; David Engel as Roger DeBris – The Producers – Musical Theatre West	**Sarah Cornell as Ulla – The Producers – Musical Theatre West**; Beth Leavel as Maisie – Minsky's – Center Theatre Group: Ahmanson Theatre; Dionne Figgins as Dionne – Smokey Joe's Cafe – El Portal Theatre in association with Corky Hale; DeLee Lively as DeLee – Smokey Joe's Cafe – El Portal Theatre in association with Corky Hale; Sharon Catherine Blanks as Sharon – Smokey Joe's Cafe – El Portal Theatre in association with Corky Hale; Nikki Crawford as Young Lena – Stormy Weather – Pasadena Playhouse; Dee Hoty as Kay Thompson – Stormy Weather – Pasadena Playhouse
Featured Actor in a Play	Featured Actress in a Play
**Hugo Armstrong as Sabretooth and Tim – Land of the Tigers – Sacred Fools, Burglars of Hamm and Frantic Redhead Productions**; Jeff Kerr McGivney as Mairtin Hanlon – A Skull in Connemara – Theatre Tribe; David Ross Paterson as Dillwyn Knox – Breaking The Code – The Production Company; David Ari as Rosen – Family Planning – Chalk Repertory Theatre; Adolphus Ward as Solly Two Kings – Gem of the Ocean – Fountain Theatre; Geoff Elliott as Hero – The Rehearsal – A Noise Within; Roger Robinson as Holloway – Two Trains Running – Ebony Repertory Theatre	**Tasha Ames as Izzy – Rabbit Hole – Malibu Stage Company**; Jenny O'Hara as Maryjohnny Rafferty – A Skull in Connemara – Theatre Tribe; Danielle Kennedy as Greta – Family Planning – Chalk Repertory Theatre; Elia Saldana as Jilly – Family Planning – Chalk Repertory Theatre; Kerry Carney as Francine Carlson – The Idea Man – Elephant Theatre Company; Josette DiCarlo as Tamara – The Prodigal Father – Celebration Theatre and Playwrights 6; Angela Goethals as Honey – Who's Afraid of Virginia Woolf? – Rubicon Theatre Company
Director of a Musical	Director of a Play
**Matt Walker – As U2 Like It – Troubadour Theater Company**; Matt Walker – Alice in One Hit Wonderland 2: Through the Looking Glass – Troubadour Theater Company; Rick Sparks – Divorce! The Musical – Rick Culbertson, in association with Lynn Marks and Paradox Entertainment; Oanh Nguyen – HAIR: The American Tribal Love-Rock Musical – The Chance Theater; Nick DeGruccio – Kiss of the Spider Woman – The Musical – Havok Theatre Company; Jeffrey Polk – Smokey Joe's Cafe – El Portal Theatre in association with Corky Hale; Jon Lawrence Rivera – The Last Five Years – East West Players	**Larissa Kokernot – Family Planning – Chalk Repertory Theatre**; Stuart Rogers – A Skull in Connemara – Theatre Tribe; August Viverito – Equus – The Production Company; Shirley Jo Finney – Stick Fly – The Matrix Theatre Company; David Fofi – The Idea Man – Elephant Theatre Company; Scott Ellis – The Little Dog Laughed – Center Theatre Group: Kirk Douglas Theatre; Israel Hicks – Two Trains Running – Ebony Repertory Theatre
Music Direction	Choreography
**Darryl Archibald – Smokey Joe's Cafe – El Portal Theatre in association with Corky Hale**; Eric Heinly – Alice in One Hit Wonderland 2: Through the Looking Glass – Troubadour Theater Company; Eric Heinly – As U2 Like It – Troubadour Theater Company; David O – Divorce! The Musical – Rick Culbertson, in association with Lynn Marks and Paradox Entertainment; Ross Wright – Joe's Garage – Open Fist Theatre Company; Billy Stritch – The Best is Yet to Come: The Music of Cy Coleman – Rubicon Theatre Company; Daniel Thomas – The Producers – Musical Theatre West	**Lee Martino – Kiss of the Spider Woman – The Musical – Havok Theatre Company**; Jon Engstrom – 42nd Street – Cabrillo Music Theatre; Nadine Ellis, Ameenah Kaplan & Christine Lakin – Alice in One Hit Wonderland 2: Through the Looking Glass – Troubadour Theater Company; Ameenah Kaplan – Altar Boyz – Celebration Theatre; Christine Lakin – As U2 Like It – Troubadour Theater Company; Kelly Todd – HAIR: The American Tribal Love-Rock Musical – The Chance Theater; Ken Roht – Ken Roht's Calendar Girl Competition – Bootleg Theater
Book/Lyrics/Music for an Original Musical	Playwrighting For An Original Play
**Erin Kamler – Divorce! The Musical – Rick Culbertson, in association with Lynn Marks and Paradox Entertainment**; Dolly Parton & Patricia Resnick – 9 to 5: The Musical – Center Theatre Group: Ahmanson Theatre; Book, Lyrics and Music by Frank Zappa, adapted by Pat Towne and Michael Franco – Joe's Garage – Open Fist Theatre Company; Ken Roht & John Ballinger – Ken Roht's Calendar Girl Competition – Bootleg Theater; Charles Strouse, Susan Birkenhead & Bob Martin – Minsky's – Center Theatre Group: Ahmanson Theatre	**Kevin King – The Idea Man – Elephant Theatre Company**; Rajiv Joseph – Bengal Tiger at the Baghdad Zoo – Center Theatre Group: Kirk Douglas Theatre; Tim Toyama & Aaron Woolfolk – Bronzeville – Robey Theatre Company; Carolyn Almos, Matt Almos, Albert Dayan and Jon Beauregard – Land of the Tigers – Sacred Fools, Burglars of Hamm and Frantic Redhead Productions; Vince Melocchi – Lions – Pacific Resident Theatre; John W. Lowell – The Letters – Andak Stage Company; Donald Margulies – Time Stands Still – Geffen Playhouse
Costume Design (Intimate Theater)	Costume Design (Large Theater)
**Ann Closs-Farley – Ken Roht's Calendar Girl Competition – Bootleg Theater**; Jeffrey Schoenberg – Bach at Leipzig – Odyssey Theatre Ensemble; Erika C. Miller – HAIR: The American Tribal Love-Rock Musical – The Chance Theater; Martine Granby – Joe's Garage – Open Fist Theatre Company; Ann Closs-Farley – Land of the Tigers – Sacred Fools, Burglars of Hamm and Frantic Redhead Productions; A. Jeffrey Schoenberg – Light Up The Sky – Open Fist Theatre Company; Catherine Glover – Who Lives? – Renal Support Network	**Sharon McGunigle – Alice in One Hit Wonderland 2: Through the Looking Glass – Troubadour Theater Company**; William Ivey Long – 9 to 5: The Musical – Center Theatre Group: Ahmanson Theatre; Ann Closs-Farley – James and the Giant Peach – MainStreet Theatre Company; Gregg Barnes – Minsky's – Center Theatre Group: Ahmanson Theatre; Soojin Lee – Oliver Twist – A Noise Within; Soojin Lee – The Rehearsal – A Noise Within; Robert Perdziola – The School of Night – Center Theatre Group: Mark Taper Forum
Lighting Design (Intimate Theater)	Lighting Design (Large Theater)
**Luke Moyer – Dracula – NoHo Arts Center Ensemble**; Luke Moyer – A Skull in Connemara – Theatre Tribe; Brian Sidney Bembridge – Battle Hymn – Circle X Theatre Company; Steven Young – Kiss of the Spider Woman – The Musical – Havok Theatre Company; Chris Wojcieszyn – Spider Bites – Theatre of NOTE; Christian Epps – Stick Fly – The Matrix Theatre Company; Jeremy Pivnick – Who Lives? – Renal Support Network	**Donald Holder – The Little Dog Laughed – Center Theatre Group: Kirk Douglas Theatre**; Jules Fisher and Peggy Eisenhauer – 9 to 5: The Musical – Center Theatre Group: Ahmanson Theatre; David Lander – Bengal Tiger at the Baghdad Zoo – Center Theatre Group: Kirk Douglas Theatre; Paul Gallo – Farragut North – Geffen Playhouse; Anne Militello – Louis & Keely, Live at the Sahara – Geffen Playhouse; Ken Booth – Oliver Twist – A Noise Within; Dan Weingarten – Two Trains Running – Ebony Repertory Theatre
Scenic Design (Intimate Theater)	Scenic Design (Large Theater)
**Jeff McLaughlin – A Skull in Connemara – Theatre Tribe**; Desma Murphy – Dracula – NoHo Arts Center Ensemble; Leonard Ogden – Eternal Equinox – Grove Theater Center; Christopher Scott Murillo – HAIR: The American Tribal Love-Rock Musical – The Chance Theater; David Harwell – Rantoul And Die – Elephant Theatre Company; John Iacovelli – Stick Fly – The Matrix Theatre Company; Will Pellegrini – Who Lives? – Renal Support Network	**Allen Moyer – The Little Dog Laughed – Center Theatre Group: Kirk Douglas Theatre**; Scott Pask – 9 to 5: The Musical – Center Theatre Group: Ahmanson Theatre; Derek McLane – Bengal Tiger at the Baghdad Zoo – Center Theatre Group: Kirk Douglas Theatre; Michael Ganio – By the Waters of Babylon – Geffen Playhouse; Anna Louizos – Minsky's – Center Theatre Group: Ahmanson Theatre; John Lee Beatty – Time Stands Still – Geffen Playhouse; Edward E. Haynes, Jr. – Two Trains Running – Ebony Repertory Theatre
Sound Design (Intimate Theater)	Sound Design (Large Theater) – 2 winners
**Ken Sawyer – Dracula –NoHo Arts Center Ensemble**; Michael Levine and Cricket S. Myers – Battle Hymn – Circle X Theatre Company; Bruno Louchouarn – Courting Vampires – The Theatre @ Boston Court; Cody Henderson and Matt Almos – Land of the Tigers – Sacred Fools, Burglars of Hamm and Frantic Redhead Productions; David B. Marling and Christopher Moscatiello – The Bird and Mr. Banks – Road Theatre Company; Joseph "Sloe" Slawinski – Treefall – Rogue Machine Theatre; Jeffrey Porter – Who Lives? – Renal Support Network	**Erik Carstensen – Beethoven as I Knew Him – Geffen Playhouse**; **Chris Webb and David Molina – Lydia – Center Theatre Group: Mark Taper Forum**; John H. Shivers – 9 to 5: The Musical – Center Theatre Group: Ahmanson Theatre; Kathryn Bostic and Cricket S. Myers – Bengal Tiger at the Baghdad Zoo – Center Theatre Group: Kirk Douglas Theatre; Lindsay Jones – Louis & Keely, Live at the Sahara – Geffen Playhouse; Cricket S. Myers – Mary's Wedding – The Colony Theatre Company; Lewis Flinn and Cricket S. Myers – The Little Dog Laughed – Center Theatre Group: Kirk Douglas Theatre
