= 2013 Ovation Awards =

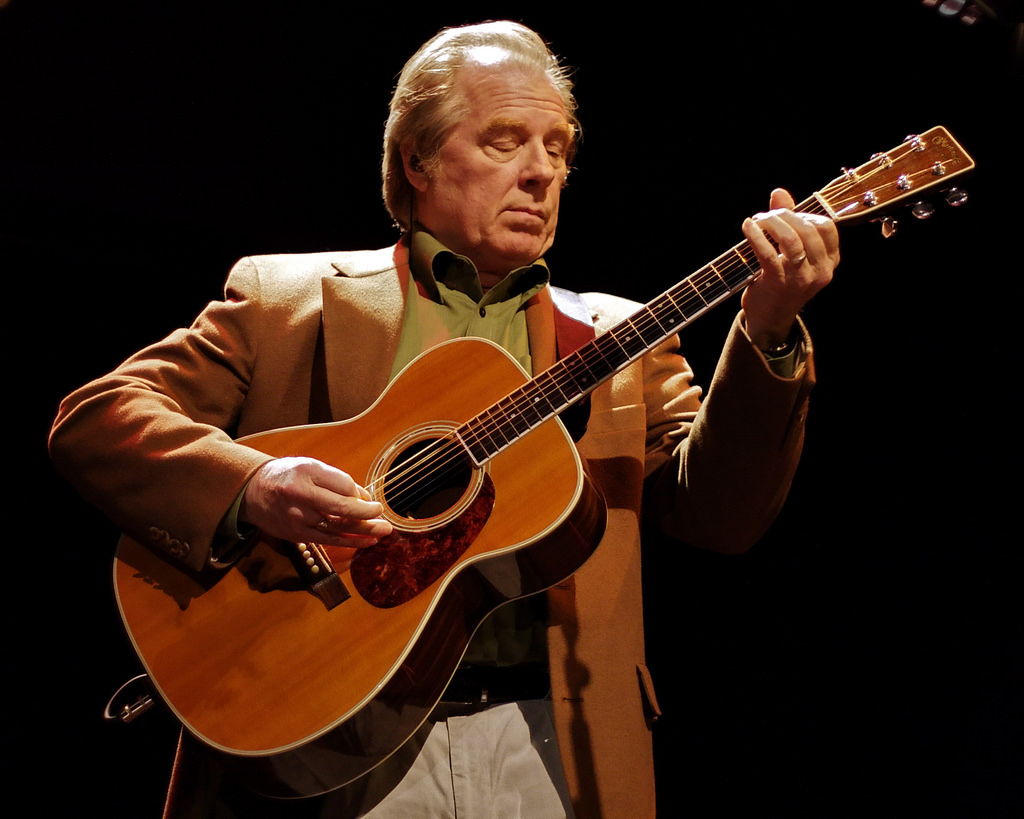
Michael McKean, Ceremony host

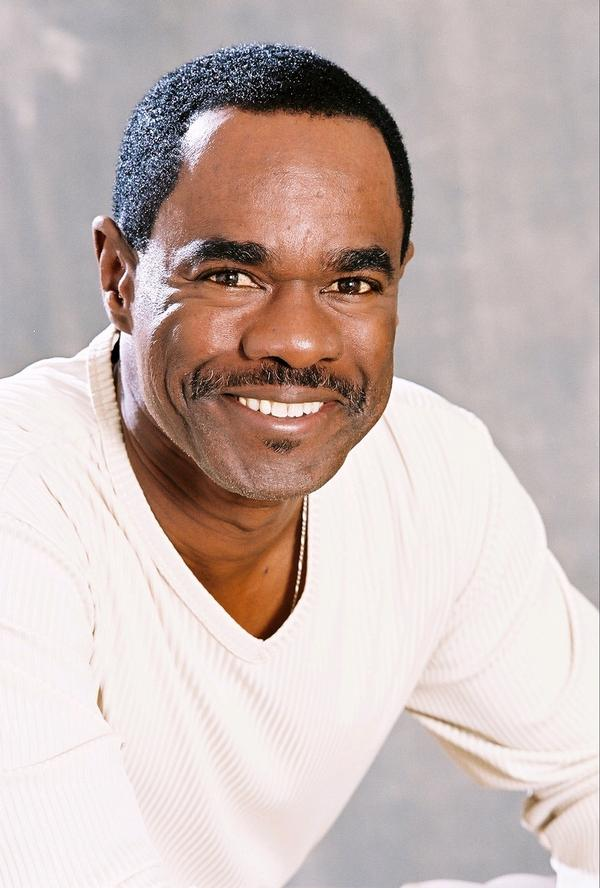
Glynn Turman, winner, Lead Actor in a Play

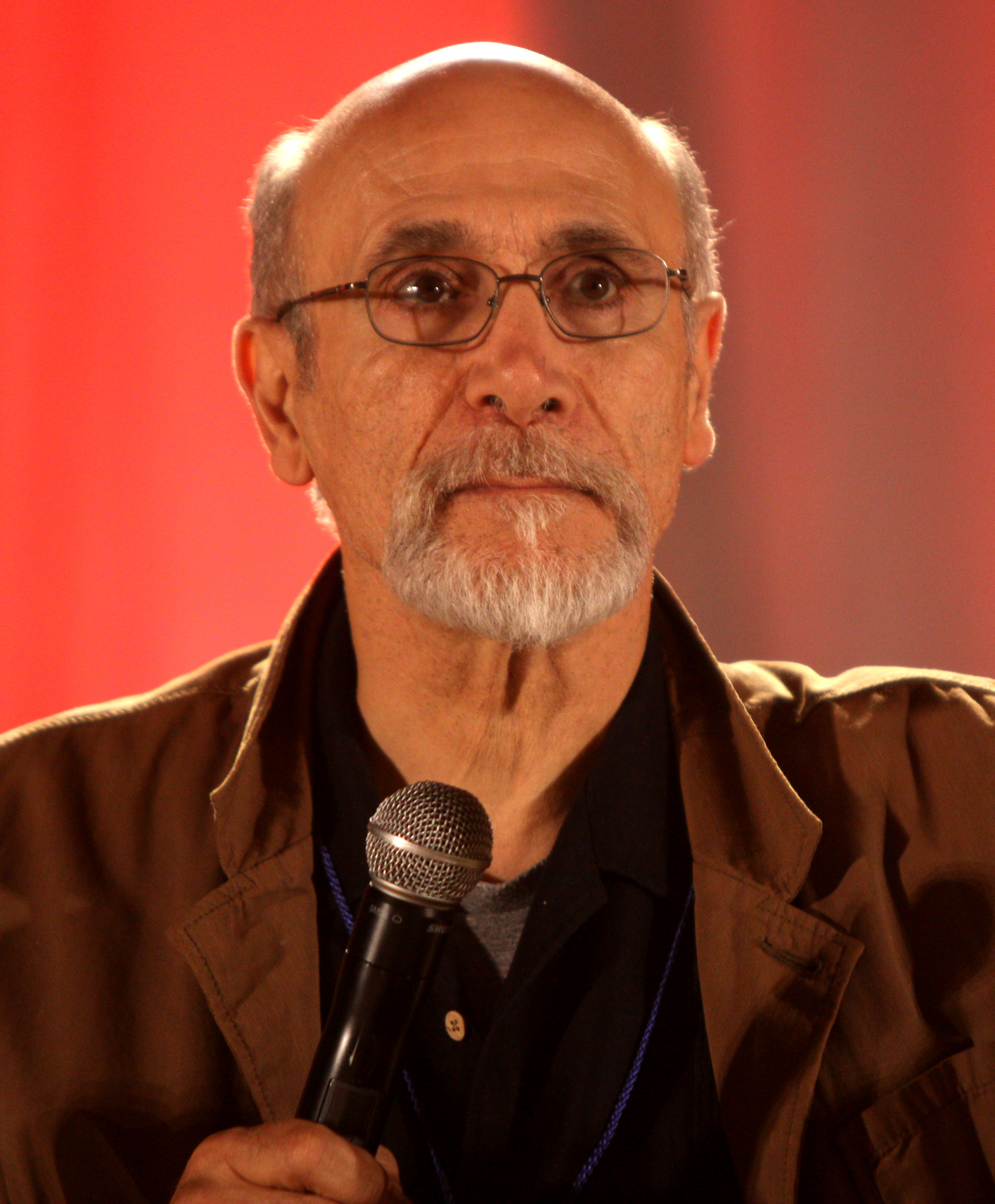
Tony Amendola, nominee, Featured Actor in a Play

The nominees for the 2013 Ovation Awards were announced on September 16, 2013, at the Barnsdall Gallery Theatre in Hollywood, California. The awards were presented for excellence in stage productions in the Los Angeles area from August 27, 2012 to August 25, 2013 based upon evaluations from 250 members of the Los Angeles theater community.

The winners were announced on November 3, 2013 in a ceremony at the San Gabriel Mission Playhouse in San Gabriel, California. The ceremony was hosted by actor Michael McKean.

== Awards ==
Winners are listed first and highlighted in boldface.

Best Production of a Musical (Intimate Theater)	Best Production of a Musical (Large Theater)
**Triassic Parq: The Musical – The Chance Theater**; Bad Apples! – Circle X Theatre; Avenue Q – DOMA Theatre Company	**Parade – 3-D Theatricals**; Legally Blonde – Cabrillo Music Theatre; Next to Normal – La Mirada Theatre for the Performing Arts; Seven Brides for Seven Brothers – La Mirada Theatre for the Performing Arts; Spring Awakening – La Mirada Theatre for the Performing Arts
Best Production of a Play (Intimate Theater)	Best Production of a Play (Large Theater)
**Dying City – Rogue Machine Theatre**; Walking the Tightrope – 24th Street Theatre; Track 3 – Theatre Movement Bazaar at the Bootleg Theatre; The Belle of Belfast – Ensemble Studio Theatre; In the Red and Brown Water – Fountain Theatre; One Night in Miami... – Rogue Machine Theatre; Our Class – Son of Semele Ensemble	**Joe Turner's Come and Gone – Center Theatre Group: Mark Taper Forum**; The Nether – Center Theatre Group: Kirk Douglas Theatre; The Royale – Center Theatre Group: Kirk Douglas Theatre; American Buffalo – Geffen Playhouse; Fallen Angels – Pasadena Playhouse
Best Presented Production	Best Season
**The Scottsboro Boys – Center Theatre Group: Ahmanson Theatre**; Tis Pity She's a Whore – Center for the Art of Performance at UCLA; Anything Goes – Center Theatre Group: Ahmanson Theatre	**La Mirada Theatre for the Performing Arts**; Antaeus Theatre Company; Center Theatre Group; Fountain Theatre; Rogue Machine Theatre
Lead Actor in a Musical	Lead Actress in a Musical
**Jeff Skowron as Leo Frank – Parade – 3-D Theatricals**; Chris Kauffmann as Princeton/Rod – Avenue Q – DOMA Theatre Company; Robert Townsend as Dan – Next to Normal – La Mirada Theatre for the Performing Arts; Coby Getzug as Moritz – Spring Awakening – La Mirada Theatre for the Performing Arts; Austin MacPhee as Melchior – Spring Awakening – La Mirada Theatre for the Performing Arts; David Burnham as Joe Gillis – Sunset Boulevard – Musical Theatre West; Keaton Williams as The Velociraptor of Innocence – Triassic Parq: The Musical – The Chance Theater	**Beth Malone as Milly – Seven Brides for Seven Brothers – La Mirada Theatre for the Performing Arts**; Caitlin Humphreys as Lucille Frank – Parade – 3-D Theatricals; Emma Degerstedt as Elle Woods – Legally Blonde – Cabrillo Music Theatre; Alet Taylor as Buck Ralston – Justin Love – Celebration Theatre; Kate Chadwick as Lindsay Skinner – Bad Apples! – Circle X Theatre; Danielle Jodovits as Kate Monster/Lucy the Slut – Avenue Q – DOMA Theatre Company; Bets Malone as Diana – Next to Normal – La Mirada Theatre for the Performing Arts
Lead Actor in a Play	Lead Actress in a Play
**Glynn Turman as Bynum Walker – Joe Turner's Come and Gone – Center Theatre Group: Mark Taper Forum**; Mark Bramhall as Granddad Stan – Walking the Tightrope – 24th Street Theatre; John Thompson as Herald Loomis – Joe Turner's Come and Gone – Center Theatre Group: Mark Taper Forum; R. Christopher Sands as Twanky – The Snow Queen – Fremont Center Theatre; Burt Grinstead as Peter & Craig – Dying City – Rogue Machine Theatre; JD Cullum as John Doe – Sexsting – Skylight Theatre Company; Bo Foxworth as John Proctor – The Crucible – The Antaeus Company	**Gigi Bermingham as Maria Callas – Master Class – International City Theatre**; Paige White as Esme – Walking the Tightrope – 24th Street Theatre; Diarra Kilpatrick as Oya – In the Red and Brown Water – Fountain Theatre; Jaimi Paige as Woman – Tender Napalm – Point First Productions; Julie Granata as Amanda – Private Lives – Rubicon Theatre Company; Rebecca Mozo as Vivie Warren – Mrs. Warren's Profession – The Antaeus Company; Blaire Chandler as Big Momma – Hot Cat – Theatre of NOTE
Featured Actor in a Musical	Featured Actress in a Musical
**Rufus Bonds, Jr. as Jim Conley – Parade – 3-D Theatricals**; Norman Large as Hugh Dorsey – Parade – 3-D Theatricals; David Vaughn as Farquaad – Shrek the Musical – 3-D Theatricals; Matt Bauer as Emmett – Legally Blonde – Cabrillo Music Theatre; Mark Whitten as Nicky/Trekkie/Bad Idea Bear – Avenue Q – DOMA Theatre Company; Norman Large as Max Von Mayerling – Sunset Boulevard – Musical Theatre West; Matt Walker as Puck/Quince – A Midsummer Saturday Night‘s Fever Dream – Troubadour Theater Company	**Kellie Spill as T-Rex 2 – Triassic Parq: The Musical – The Chance Theater**; Jaycie Dotin as Brooke – Legally Blonde – Cabrillo Music Theatre; Lowe Taylor as Paulette – Legally Blonde – Cabrillo Music Theatre; Tessa Grady as Natalie – Next to Normal – La Mirada Theatre for the Performing Arts; Micaela Martinez as T-Rex 1 – Triassic Parq: The Musical – The Chance Theater; Camryn Zelinger as Morgan Freeman/Velociraptor of Science – Triassic Parq: The Musical – The Chance Theater; Beth Kennedy as Helena/Faerie – A Midsummer Saturday Night‘s Fever Dream – Troubadour Theater Company
Featured Actor in a Play	Featured Actress in a Play
**Dakin Matthews as Doyle – The Nether – Center Theatre Group: Kirk Douglas Theatre**; Mark Skeens as Andre – Track 3 – Theatre Movement Bazaar at the Bootleg Theatre; Adam Hunter as Woodnut – The Nether – Center Theatre Group: Kirk Douglas Theatre; Robert Gossett as Wynton – The Royale – Center Theatre Group: Kirk Douglas Theatre; Billy Meleady as Father Behan – The Belle of Belfast – Ensemble Studio Theatre; Jefferson Mays as Bernard Woolley – Yes, Prime Minister – Geffen Playhouse; Tony Amendola as Sir George Crofts – Mrs. Warren's Profession – The Antaeus Company	**Brighid Fleming as Iris – The Nether – Center Theatre Group: Kirk Douglas Theatre**; January LaVoy as Mattie Campbell – Joe Turner's Come and Gone – Center Theatre Group: Mark Taper Forum; Kimberlee Soo as Lucy Law – The Fourth Graders Present an Unnamed Love-Suicide – Coeurage Theatre Company; Annika Marks as Candace – Doesn‘t Anyone Know What a Pancreas Is? – Ensemble Studio Theatre; Peggy Blow as Mama Mojo – In the Red and Brown Water – Fountain Theatre; Iona Morris as Aunt Elegba – In the Red and Brown Water – Fountain Theatre; Betsy Zajko as Pauline – A Bright New Boise – Rogue Machine Theatre; Catia Ojeda as Maria – Brendan – Theatre Banshee
Acting Ensemble of a Musical	Acting Ensemble for a Play
**The cast of Parade – 3-D Theatricals**; The cast of Legally Blonde – Cabrillo Music Theatretre; The cast of Avenue Q – DOMA Theatre Company; The cast of Next to Normal – La Mirada Theatre for the Performing Arts; The cast of Seven Brides for Seven Brothers – La Mirada Theatre for the Performing Arts; The cast of Spring Awakening – La Mirada Theatre for the Performing Arts; The cast of Triassic Parq: The Musical – The Chance Theater	**The cast of Joe Turner's Come and Gone – Center Theatre Group: Mark Taper Forum**; The cast of Walking the Tightrope – 24th Street Theatre; The cast of Edith Can Shoot Things and Hit Them – Artists at Play; The cast of The Belle of Belfast – Ensemble Studio Theatre; The cast of In the Red and Brown Water – Fountain Theatre; The cast of One Night in Miami... – Rogue Machine Theatre; The cast of We Are Proud to Present a Presentation About the Herero of Namibia... – The Matrix Theatre Company
Director of a Musical	Director of a Play
**Brian Kite – Spring Awakening – La Mirada Theatre for the Performing Arts**; T.J. Dawson – Parade – 3-D Theatricals; Nick DeGruccio – Next to Normal – La Mirada Theatre for the Performing Arts; Glenn Casale – Seven Brides for Seven Brothers – La Mirada Theatre for the Performing Arts; Marshall Pailet – Triassic Parq: The Musical – The Chance Theater	**Shirley Jo Finney – In the Red and Brown Water – Fountain Theatre**; Debbie Devine – Walking the Tightrope – 24th Street Theatre; Tina Kronis – Track 3 – Theatre Movement Bazaar at the Bootleg Theatre; Art Manke – Fallen Angels – Pasadena Playhouse; Michael Peretzian – Dying City – Rogue Machine Theatre; Matthew McCray – Our Class – Son of Semele Ensemble; Tina Kronis – Hot Cat – Theatre of NOTE
Music Direction	Choreography
**Taylor Stephenson – Triassic Parq: The Musical – The Chance Theater**; David Lamoureux – Parade – 3-D Theatricals; Chris Raymond – Avenue Q – DOMA Theatre Company; Darryl Archibald – Next to Normal – La Mirada Theatre for the Performing Arts; Dennis Castellano – Seven Brides for Seven Brothers – La Mirada Theatre for the Performing Arts; John Glaudini – Spring Awakening – La Mirada Theatre for the Performing Arts; Dennis Castellano – Oklahoma! – Musical Theatre West	**Ameenah Kaplan – The Royale – Center Theatre Group: Kirk Douglas Theatre**; Dana Solimando – Parade – 3-D Theatricals; Tina Kronis – Track 3 – Theatre Movement Bazaar at the Bootleg Theatre; Anil Natyaveda – Encounter – East West Players; Lee Martino – Oklahoma! – Musical Theatre West; Kelly Todd – Triassic Parq: The Musical – The Chance Theater; Tina Kronis – Hot Cat – Theatre of NOTE
Book for an Original Musical	Lyrics/Music for an Original Musical
**Jim Leonard – Bad Apples! – Circle X Theatre**; Bret Calder – Justin Love – Celebration Theatre; Velina Hasu Houston – Tea With Music – East West Players	**Rob Cairns, Jim Leonard and Beth Thornley – Bad Apples! – Circle X Theatre**; David Manning and Lori Scarlett – Justin Love – Celebration Theatre; Michael Fisher – Doomsday Cabaret: A Rock Musical of Apocalyptic Proportions – Orgasmico Theatre Company
Playwrighting For An Original Play	
**Jennifer Haley – The Nether – Center Theatre Group: Kirk Douglas Theatre**; Marco Ramirez – The Royale – Center Theatre Group: Kirk Douglas Theatre; Nate Edelman – The Belle of Belfast – Ensemble Studio Theatre; Robert Mersola – Dirty Filthy Love Story – Rogue Machine Theatre; Kemp Powers – One Night in Miami... – Rogue Machine Theatre; Kathryn Walat – Creation – The Theatre @ Boston Court; Richard Alger – Hot Cat – Theatre of NOTE	
Lighting Design (Intimate Theater)	Lighting Design (Large Theater)
**Jeremy Pivnick – Cassiopeia – The Theatre @ Boston Court**; Dan Weingarten – Heart of Darkness – Actors’ Gang; Jeremy Pivnick – Bad Apples! – Circle X Theatre; Leigh Allen – Dying City – Rogue Machine Theatre; Jeremy Pivnick – Mrs. Warren's Profession – The Antaeus Company; Zack Lipinski and Tim Swiss – Peter Pan: The Boy Who Hated Mothers – Blank Theatre Company; Matt Schleicher – Triassic Parq: The Musical – The Chance Theater	**Christopher Kuhl – The Nether – Center Theatre Group: Kirk Douglas Theatre**; Jean-Yves Tessier – Parade – 3-D Theatricals; Allen Hughes – Joe Turner's Come and Gone – Center Theatre Group: Mark Taper Forum; Lap Chi Chu – The Royale – Center Theatre Group: Kirk Douglas Theatre; Steven Young – Next to Normal – La Mirada Theatre for the Performing Arts; Tom Ruzika – Seven Brides for Seven Brothers – La Mirada Theatre for the Performing Arts; Steven Young – Spring Awakening – La Mirada Theatre for the Performing Arts
Scenic Design (Intimate Theater)	Scenic Design (Large Theater)
**Tom Walsh – Annapurna – Odyssey Theatre Ensemble**; Michael Allen – Long Way Go Down – Art of Acting Studio; Desma Murphy – Cooperstown – Road Theatre Company; Tom Buderwitz – Dying City – Rogue Machine Theatre; Tom Buderwitz – You Can't Take It With You – The Antaeus Company; Stephen Gifford – Cassiopeia – The Theatre @ Boston Court; Danny Cistone – Cops and Friends of Cops – Vs. Theatre Company	**Adrian Jones – The Nether – Center Theatre Group: Kirk Douglas Theatre**; Tom Buderwitz – Parade – 3-D Theatricals; Andrew Boyce – The Royale – Center Theatre Group: Kirk Douglas Theatre; Tom Buderwitz – The Second City's A Christmas Carol: Twist Your Dickens! – Center Theatre Group: Kirk Douglas Theatre; Takeshi Kata – American Buffalo – Geffen Playhouse; Myung Hee Cho – Miss Julie – Geffen Playhouse; Tom Buderwitz – Fallen Angels – Pasadena Playhouse
Sound Design (Intimate Theater)	Sound Design (Large Theater)
**John Zalewski – Theatre in the Dark – Odyssey Theatre Ensemble**; John Zalewski – Walking the Tightrope – 24th Street Theatre; Mark Nichols – Heart of Darkness – Actors’ Gang; John Zalewski – Death of a Salesgirl – Bootleg Theater; Cricket S. Myers – Bad Apples! – Circle X Theatre; John Zalewski – Mrs. Warren's Profession – The Antaeus Company; Jack Arky – Cassiopeia – The Theatre @ Boston Court	**John Zalewski – The Nether – Center Theatre Group: Kirk Douglas Theatre**; Cricket S. Myers – Joe Turner's Come and Gone – Center Theatre Group: Mark Taper Forum; Ryan Rumery – The Royale – Center Theatre Group: Kirk Douglas Theatre; Cricket S. Myers – The Second City's A Christmas Carol: Twist Your Dickens! – Center Theatre Group: Kirk Douglas Theatre; Josh Bessom – Seven Brides for Seven Brothers – La Mirada Theatre for the Performing Arts; Julie Ferrin – Oklahoma! – Musical Theatre West; Steven Cahill – Fallen Angels – Pasadena Playhouse
Costume Design (Intimate Theater)	Costume Design (Large Theater)
**Michael Mullen – Dreamgirls – DOMA Theatre Company**; Ann Closs-Farley – Heart of Darkness – Actors’ Gang; Naila Aladdin-Sanders – One Night in Miami... – Rogue Machine Theatre; A. Jeffrey Schoenberg – Mrs. Warren's Profession – The Antaeus Company; A. Jeffrey Schoenberg – You Can't Take It With You – The Antaeus Company; Anthony Tran – Triassic Parq: The Musical – The Chance Theater; Ann Closs-Farley – American Misfit – The Theatre @ Boston Court	**Alex Jaeger – The Nether – Center Theatre Group: Kirk Douglas Theatre**; Shon LeBlanc – Parade – 3-D Theatricals; Kate Bergh – Shrek the Musical – 3-D Theatricals; Karen Perry – Joe Turner's Come and Gone – Center Theatre Group: Mark Taper Forum; Tobin Ost – Jekyll & Hyde – La Mirada Theatre for the Performing Arts; David Kay Mickelsen – Fallen Angels – Pasadena Playhouse; Sharon McGunigle – Rudolph the Red-Nosed Reindoors – Troubadour Theater Company

== Ovation Honors ==
Ovation Honors, which recognize outstanding achievement in areas that are not among the standard list of nomination categories, were presented when the nominations were announced.

- Composition for a Play – Michael Redfield – Walking the Tightrope – 24th Street Theatre
- Fight Choreography – Ken Merckx – Cymbeline – A Noise Within
- Puppet Design – Derek Lux and Christian Anderson – Shrek the Musical – 3-D Theatricals
- Video Design – Jeffrey Elias Teeter – On the Spectrum – Fountain Theatre
