= Mark Taper Forum =

Theatre in Los Angeles, US

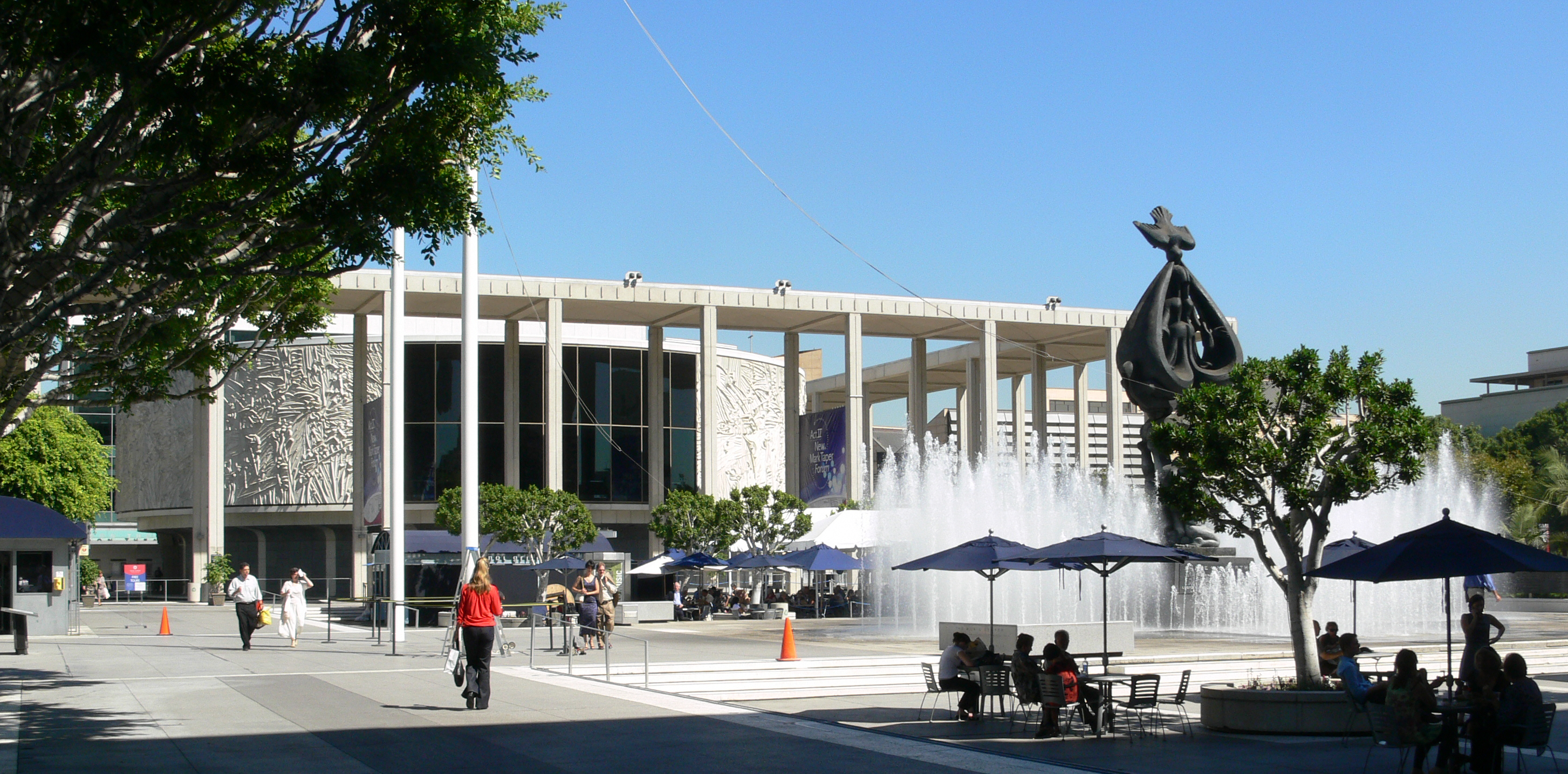
- Interactive map of Mark Taper Forum
- Address: 135 North Grand Avenue; Los Angeles, California; United States
- Coordinates: 34°3′27″N 118°14′52″W
- Owner: Los Angeles Music Center
- Operator: The Music Center
- Capacity: 739
- Public transit: Civic Ctr; Grand Av
- Parking: Yes

Construction
- Built: 1964–1967
- Opened: 1967
- Renovated: 2008
- Architects: Welton Becket & Associates (1967), Rios Clementi Hale Studios (2008)
- Main contractor: Peter Kiewit & Sons (1967)

Website
- www.musiccenter.org

The Mark Taper Forum is a 739-seat thrust stage at the Los Angeles Music Center designed by Welton Becket and Associates on the Bunker Hill section of downtown Los Angeles. Named for real estate developer Mark Taper, the Forum, the neighboring Ahmanson Theatre and the Kirk Douglas Theatre are all operated by the Center Theatre Group.

== History ==
Poster for the 1974 season

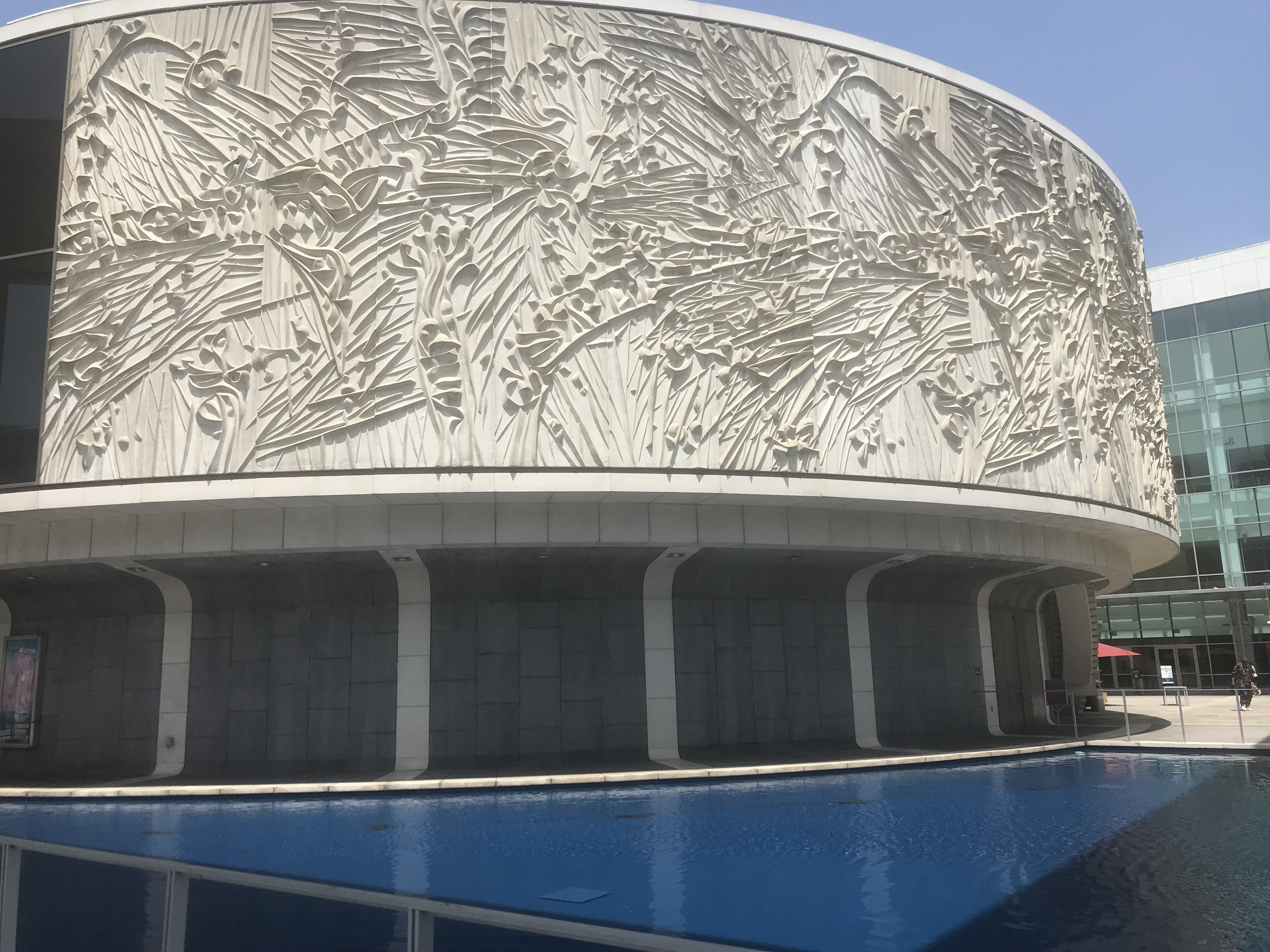
The Taper in August 2025.

The Mark Taper Forum opened in 1967 as part of the Los Angeles Music Center, the West Coast equivalent of Lincoln Center, designed by Los Angeles architect Welton Becket and Associates. Peter Kiewit and Sons (now Kiewit Corporation) was the builder. The dedication took place on April 9, 1967, at an event attended by Governor Ronald Reagan. The smallest of the three venues, the Taper is flanked by the Dorothy Chandler Pavilion and the Ahmanson Theatre on the Music Center Plaza.

Becket designed the center in the style of New Formalism, which emphasized geometric shapes. The perfectly circular Taper is considered one of his best works, featuring a distinctive decorated drum of a design with its exterior wrapped in a lacy precast relief by Jacques Overhoff. The lobby has a curving, abalone wall by Tony Duquette. Charles Moore described Becket's design for the Music Center as "Late Imperial Depression-Style cake".

Becket designed the building not knowing who would use it. Various proposals included chamber music concerts, or even grand jury meetings. Ultimately Dorothy Chandler, the Los Angeles cultural leader, convinced Center Theater Group artistic director Gordon Davidson to use the Taper. For 38 years, Davidson was the artistic director of Center Theater Group, which also ran the Ahmanson and eventually the Kirk Douglas Theater in Culver City. The Taper became known for its thrust stage, jutting into a classical, semicircular amphitheater, which creates an especially intimate relationship between audience and performer.

The building bears an architectural resemblance to Carousel Theatre at Disneyland, also designed by Welton Becket and Associates in 1967. It is similar in design concept and size to the Dallas Theatre Center, designed by Frank Lloyd Wright and the original Tyrone Guthrie Theatre, in Minneapolis.

On October 8, 1993, a memorial was held in the actor Richard Jordan's honor. It was the same day his final movie Gettysburg was released.

In June 2023 the Center Theatre Group announced an indefinite pause of shows at the Mark Taper Forum. The Mark Taper Forum re-opened a year later in October 2024 and remains open.

== Renovation ==
A $30-million renovation of the Taper led by the Los Angeles firm Rios Clementi Hale Studios began in July 2007 after the 2006/2007 season. The theater reopened on August 30, 2008, for the first preview of John Guare's The House of Blue Leaves.

The Taper, as originally designed, was a case study in what happens when a theater is built without a tenant in mind. Fitting the auditorium into the circular building left a tiny backstage and only a narrow, curved hallway for a lobby.

The renovation updated nearly everything that was not concrete and did not disrupt the building's circular shape. To create a larger main lobby, the designers reduced the ticket booth and removed about 30 parking spaces from the lower-level garage to move the restrooms below ground as part of a stylized lounge with gold, curved couches and mosaics of mirrored tiles that fit the era in which the building was designed. The theater seats are wider and total capacity was reduced from 745 to 739. The entrance was moved to the plaza level and an elevator added to increase the accessibility of the theater.

The original theater also had very few women's restrooms opening with four women's stalls for a 750-seat hall. The renovation increased the number of stalls to 16. Backstage, changes included removing an outdated stage "treadmill" and old air-conditioning equipment, installing a modern lighting grid, and enlarging the load-in door to 6 feet by 9 feet. A wardrobe room was constructed in the space previously occupied by the air-conditioning equipment.

The auditorium was renamed the Amelia Taper Auditorium after a $2 million gift from the S. Mark Taper Foundation.

== Production history ==
The Taper has presented innovative plays since its 1967-opening of The Devils from playwright John Whiting about the sexual fantasies of a 17th-century priest and a sexually repressed nun. The play received a great deal of protest from local religious leaders and the Los Angeles County Board of Supervisors, although the production continued.

The production of such plays as Murderous Angels, The Dream on Monkey Mountain, Children of a Lesser God, Savages, The Shadow Box, The Kentucky Cycle and Angels in America has established definition of a "Taper play"; one which is provocative, political and liberal.

The Taper has been host to world premiere productions of many notable plays including The Shadow Box (1975), Zoot Suit (1978), Children of a Lesser God (1979), Neil Simon's I Ought To Be In Pictures (1980), Lanford Wilson's Burn This (1987), Jelly's Last Jam (1991), Angels in America (1992), Twilight: Los Angeles, 1992 (1994), David Henry Hwang's revised version of Flower Drum Song (2001), August Wilson's Radio Golf (2005) and the musical 13 (2007).

In all, the theater has 5 Tony Awards to its credit.

== Awards and nominations ==
Awards	Production	Nominations	Wins	Notes
2009 Ovation Awards	Lydia	2	1	Won for Sound Design
2009 Ovation Awards	The School of Night	1	0	
2010 Ovation Awards	Parade	12	2	Won for Featured Actor and Costume Design
2010 Ovation Awards	The Lieutenant of Inishmore	1	0	
2012 Ovation Awards	Waiting For Godot	10	4	Won for Lead Actor, Featured Actor, Acting Ensemble, and Video Design
2012 Ovation Awards	Red	1	0	
2012 Ovation Awards	Poor Behavior	1	0	
2013 Ovation Awards	Joe Turner's Come and Gone	8	3	Won for Best Production, Lead Actor, and Acting Ensemble
