= Josh Clark (actor) =

American actor

- Born: August 16, 1955 (age 70); Bethesda, Maryland, U.S.
- Years active: 1976 – present

Josh Clark (born August 16, 1955) is an American stage and screen actor.

== Biography ==
Clark was born in Bethesda, Maryland. He studied acting at the North Carolina School of the Arts.

== Acting career ==
His first screen role was in the 1976 TV movie The Other Side of Victory. Since then he has continued to work primarily in television with guest roles on various series including recent stints (2012 - 2015) on True Detective, Murder in the First, (recurring), Justified, Scorpion, Aquarius, Hawaii Five-0, Gang Related, Vegas, Shameless, Criminal Minds, The Mentalist, Scandal, Body of Proof, Grey's Anatomy, and Modern Family.

Clark has been featured in several science fiction series. In 1987, he had a guest role in a first-season episode of Star Trek: The Next Generation. In 1995, Clark would return to the Star Trek universe when he had a recurring role on Star Trek: Voyager as Lieutenant Joe Carey. He has also appeared in Babylon 5, and its spin-off series Crusade, as well as Millennium and The Invisible Man. In 2006, he had a recurring role in the sci-fi/fantasy series Heroes.

Clark has also appeared in several films, most recently with a supporting role in Disney's McFarland, USA, and including Faster, (2010), the indie film I Am I, (2013), the short film Stranger at the Pentagon, (2013), Fingers (1978), Ragtime (1981), and the Tom Hanks comedy Big (1988).

Clark has numerous theatre credits to his name. On Broadway, he appeared in Execution of Justice, The Man Who Came To Dinner, and he played the March Hare in Alice In Wonderland. He was in several plays at the Manhattan Theater Club, and also played the title role in The Wanderings of Odysseus at the Mark Taper Forum in Los Angeles, where he also stood by for Martin Sheen in The Subject Was Roses, and replaced a major supporting role in iWitness. Clark currently resides in Los Angeles, where he received an Ovation nomination in 2012 for featured actor in The Savannah Disputation at the Colony Theater. He is a member of the Antaeus Theater Company, and played the lead role there in Noël Coward's Peace in Our Time, which won an Ovation award for best production at a smaller theater in 2010, and performed in Lillian Helman's Autumn Garden, among many productions.
