= The Matrix Theatre Company =

Coordinates: 34.083956°N 118.356660°W

- Interactive map of The Matrix Theatre Company
- Location: 7657 Melrose Avenue; Los Angeles, California, United States
- Seating type: Reserved
- Capacity: 99
- Type: Theatre

Construction
- Opened: 1977

Website
- matrixtheatre.com

The Matrix Theatre Company is a theatre company located in Los Angeles, California.

== Origins ==
The Matrix was opened in 1977 by producer Joseph Stern. After growing up in Los Angeles mere blocks from the Matrix, Stern later became a New York actor and a Hollywood television producer known for such series as Law & Order, Judging Amy and Cagney & Lacey. Stern bought the Matrix with actor William Devane to keep it from being demolished and during a time when Los Angeles had few 99-seat theaters.

To buy his half of the Matrix Stern had his father lend him the money in the 1970s and later borrowed from his father again in the 1980s to buy Devane's half of the theatre.

Stern was quoted as saying the Matrix had previously been "a psychiatric institution and Spike Jones’ soundstage.”

The Matrix's debut play in 1980 was A Life in the Theatre by David Mamet.

== Later productions ==
In 2018, the Matrix premiered The Guy Who Didn't Like Musicals by StarKid Productions.

== Awards and nominations ==
Awards	Production	Nominations	Wins	Notes
2009 Ovation Awards	Stick Fly	5	1	Won for Acting Ensemble
2011 Ovation Awards	Neighbors	4	0	
2012 Ovation Awards	All My Sons	3	0	
2013 Ovation Awards	We Are Proud to Present a Presentation About the Herero of Namibia, Formerly Known as Southwest Africa, From the German Sudwestafrika, Between the Years 1884-1915	1	0	
2019 BroadwayWorld Los Angeles Awards	The Guy Who Didn't Like Musicals			
