= Troubadour Theater Company =

Theater company in Los Angeles

Troubadour Theater Company is a theater company in Los Angeles.

They play at the Falcon Theatre, and Richard and Karen Carpenter Performing Arts Center, Long Beach, and give readings at the Getty Museum.

In 2009, they played Oedipus the King, Mama!, and Chekhov’s The Seagull.

== Awards and nominations ==
Awards	Production	Nominations	Wins	Notes
2009 Ovation Awards	Alice in One Hit Wonderland 2: Through the Looking Glass	6	1	Won for Costume Design (Sharon McGunigle)
2009 Ovation Awards	As U2 Like It	5	1	Won for Director of a Musical (Matt Walker)
2009 Ovation Awards		1	1	Won award for Best Season
2010 Ovation Awards	Oedipus the King, Mama!	2	2	Won Best Production of a Musical and Director of a Musical (Matt Walker)
2010 Ovation Awards	CHiPs The Musical	2	0	
2010 Ovation Awards	Frosty The Snow Manilow	1	0	
2010 Ovation Awards		1	0	Nominated for Best Season
2011 Ovation Awards	A Wither’s Tale	10	4	Won for Director, Featured Actor, Featured Actress, and Acting Ensemble
2011 Ovation Awards	The First Jo-El	5	0	
2011 Ovation Awards		1	1	Won award for Best Season
2012 Ovation Awards	Two Gentlemen Of Chicago	6	0	
2012 Ovation Awards	A Christmas Westside Story	3	0	
2013 Ovation Awards	A Midsummer Saturday Night‘s Fever Dream	2	0	
2013 Ovation Awards	Rudolph the Red-Nosed Reindoors	1	0	
