= Kirk Douglas Theatre =

Theater in Culver City, California, US

- The Culver Theatre
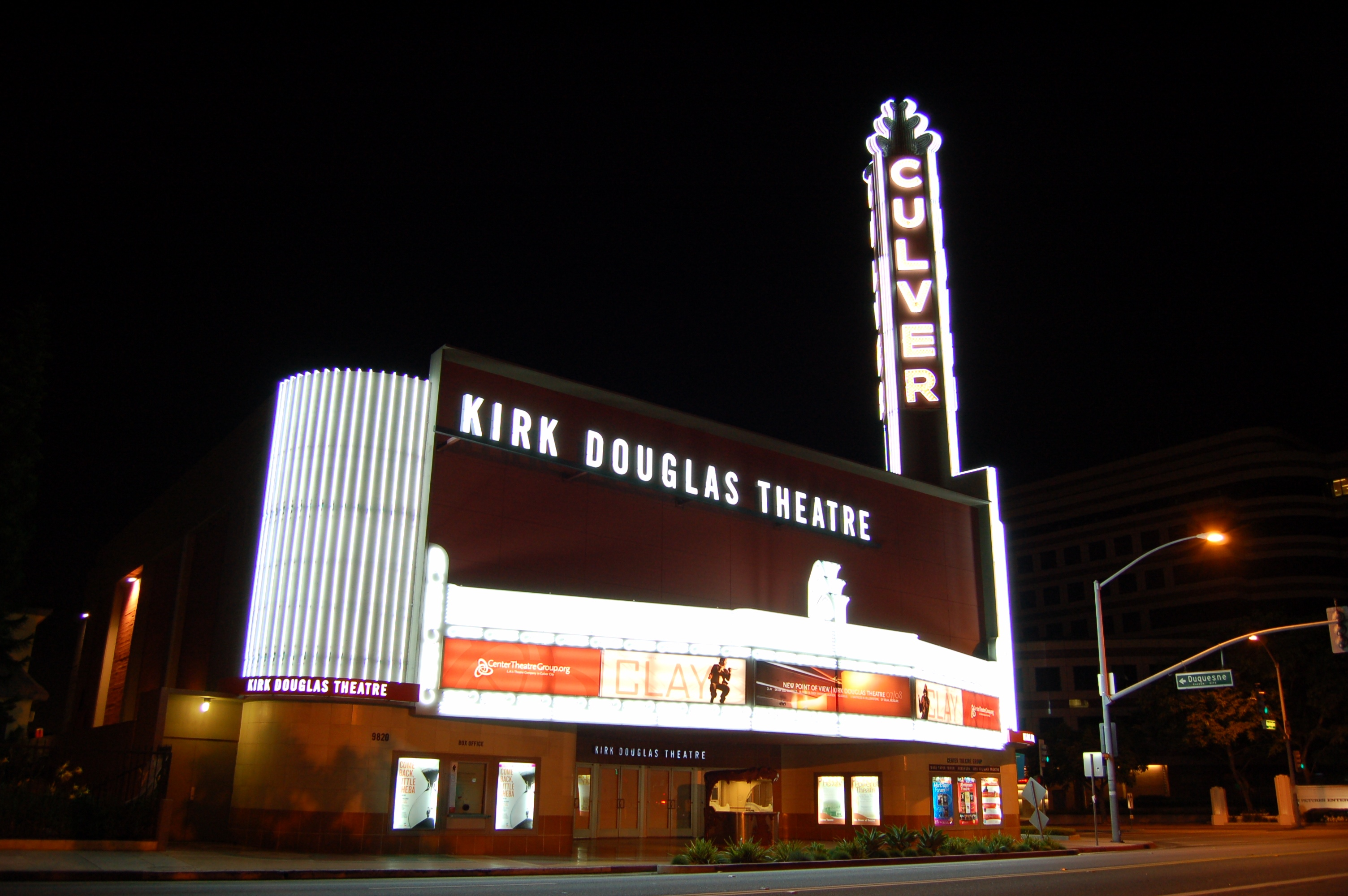
- Kirk Douglas Theatre during the run of Clay, a 2008 hip-hop Shakespeare-inspired musical.
- Interactive map of Kirk Douglas Theatre
- Address: 9820 Washington Boulevard; Culver City, California; 90232
- Coordinates: 34°01′18″N 118°23′49″W
- Owner: Center Theatre Group
- Capacity: 317
- Public transit: Culver City

Construction
- Opened: 1947 (as the Culver Theatre); 2004 (as Kirk Douglas Theatre)

Website
- www.centertheatregroup.org

The Kirk Douglas Theatre is a 317-seat theater located in Culver City, California, United States. Since 2004, it has been operated by the Center Theatre Group.

== History ==
Built in 1946, as a Streamline Moderne movie palace with a seating capacity of 1,160 (on a stadium plan with no overhanging balcony), the Culver Theatre (as it was previously named) was located near the Columbia Pictures studio lot (then the lot for MGM). It opened on Wednesday August 13, 1947.

The Culver Theater, 1977

Originally, much like surrounding downtown Culver City, the Culver was a key part of classic Hollywood's thriving entertainment community. But, eventually, much of the entertainment industry moved to points north and the theater grew tired and worn over the years.

Today, the Culver, now renamed the Kirk Douglas Theatre, operates as a performing arts center and playhouse. An $8 million restoration project, with a $1.25 million grant from the City of Culver City, included the addition of two new stages, one with 100 seats and another with over 300 seats. Most of the exterior has been preserved, including the box office and the signature mezzanine tile.

== Awards and nominations ==
Awards	Production	Nominations	Wins	Notes
2009 Ovation Awards	The Little Dog Laughed	6	3	Won for Lead Actress, Scenic Design and Lighting Design
2009 Ovation Awards	Bengal Tiger at the Baghdad Zoo	4	0	
2010 Ovation Awards	The Wake	3	1	Won for Featured Actress
2011 Ovation Awards	Venice	11	3	Won for Lighting Design, Sound Design, and Video Design
2012 Ovation Awards	The Convert	11	6	Won for Lead Actress, Featured Actress, Director, and 3 design awards
2012 Ovation Awards	American Night: The Ballad Of Juan Jose	4	1	Won for Achievement in Video Design
2012 Ovation Awards	The Night Watcher	1	0	
2013 Ovation Awards	The Nether	9	7	Won for Featured Actor, Featured Actress, Playwrighting, and 4 design awards
2013 Ovation Awards	The Royale	7	1	Won for Choreography
2013 Ovation Awards	The Second City's A Christmas Carol: Twist Your Dickens!	2	0	
