= Ahmanson Theatre =

Performing arts theatre in Los Angeles, California

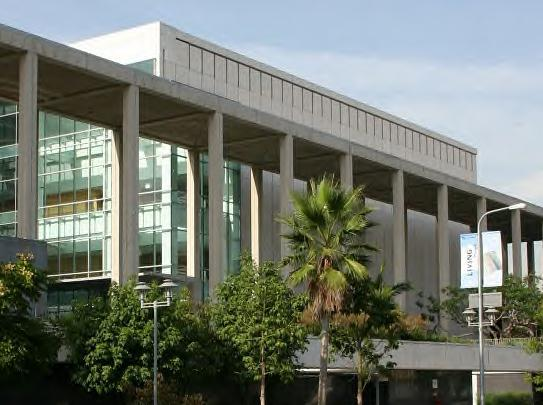
- Ahmanson Theatre
- Interactive map of Ahmanson Theatre
- Location: 135 North Grand Avenue; Los Angeles, California
- Coordinates: 34°3′29″N 118°14′50″W
- Owner: Los Angeles Music Center
- Seating type: Reserved
- Capacity: 2,084
- Type: Indoor Theatre
- Public transit: Civic Ctr; Grand Av

Construction
- Groundbreaking: March 9, 1962
- Built: 1962–1967
- Opened: April 12, 1967
- Renovated: January 25, 1995
- Architects: Welton Becket & Associates (1967), Ellerbe Becket (1995)
- Main contractors: Peter Kiewit & Sons (1967), Robert F. Mahoney & Associates (1995)

Website
- Official Website

The Ahmanson Theatre is one of the four main venues that compose the Los Angeles Music Center. Shows at this theatre are produced by Center Theatre Group.

== History ==
The theatre was built as a result of a donation from Howard F. Ahmanson Sr, the founder of H.F. Ahmanson & Co., an insurance and savings and loans company. It was named for his second wife, businesswoman and philanthropist Caroline Leonetti Ahmanson.

Inaugural Program 1967

Welton Becket & Associates was the architect. Construction began on March 9, 1962 and was undertaken by Peter Kiewit & Sons (now Kiewit Corporation). The theatre's inaugural event was held on April 12, 1967, with the Los Angeles Civic Light Opera Association sponsoring the national cast production of Man of La Mancha, starring Richard Kiley and Joan Diener. The theatre also was the U.S. premiere of More Stately Mansions starring Ingrid Bergman, Arthur Hill, and Colleen Dewhurst, which opened September 12 of that same year. Since then, it has presented a wide variety of dramas, musicals, comedies and revivals of the classics, including six world premieres of Neil Simon plays and works by Wendy Wasserstein, August Wilson, A.R. Gurney, Terrence McNally, John Guare and Edward Albee. The Ahmanson also has served in the capacity of co-producer for a number of Broadway productions, including Amadeus, Smokey Joe's Cafe, The Most Happy Fella, and The Drowsy Chaperone.

The theatre was also home to the Los Angeles production of The Phantom of the Opera which ran at the theatre from 1989 to 1993. It opened with the original London and Broadway Phantom Michael Crawford as the Phantom. He was later replaced with actor Robert Guillaume, and then Davis Gaines.

The Ahmanson has the largest theatrical season-ticket subscription base on the West Coast. Its year-round season begins in early fall and lasts through late summer.

=== 1990s renovation ===
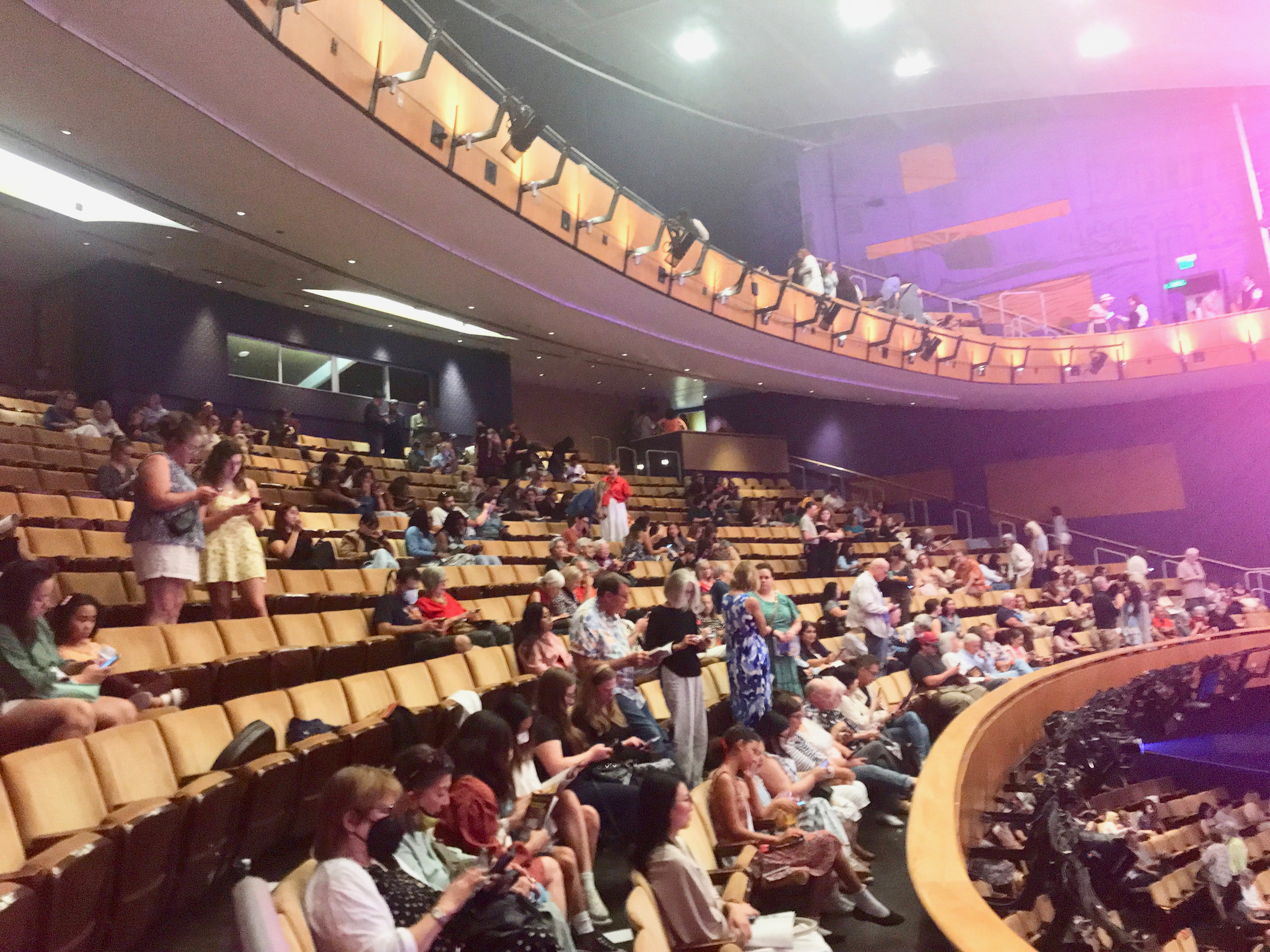
Inside the Ahmanson in 2025

Throughout 1994, a major $17 million renovation moved the mezzanine and balcony closer to the stage, reduced the width of the auditorium, lowered the ceiling and significantly improved the acoustics, which had long been criticized since the theatre's opening. It also allowed the theatre's seating capacity to be reconfigured from 1,600 seats for an intimate play to 2,084 for a major Broadway-sized musical.

Designed by Ellerbe Becket Architects and constructed by Robert F. Mahoney & Associates, the renovation took eighteen months to complete. During this time, the Ahmanson's season-ticket subscriptions were presented at the UCLA James A. Doolittle Theatre (now known as Ricardo Montalbán Theatre) in Hollywood. The Ahmanson reopened on January 25, 1995, with an 8 1/2-month-long run of Miss Saigon.

== World premieres ==
The Ahmanson served as the world premiere venue for the following plays and musicals:

- The Happy Time (1967) – Book by N. Richard Nash, Music by John Kander Lyrics by Fred Ebb, Directed by Gower Champion
- Catch My Soul (1968) – Book by N. Richard Nash, Music by Ray Pohlman Lyrics by William Shakespeare
- Love Match (1968) – Book by Christian Hamilton, Music by David Shire Lyrics by Richard Maltby Jr.
- Remote Asylum (1970) – written by Mart Crowley, starring William Shatner
- California Suite (1976) – written by Neil Simon
- Chapter Two (1977) – written by Neil Simon
- They're Playing Our Song (1978) – Book by Neil Simon, Music by Marvin Hamlisch, Lyrics by Carole Bayer Sager
- The West Side Waltz (1981) – written by Ernest Thompson, starring Katharine Hepburn and Dorothy Loudon
- Brighton Beach Memoirs (1982) – written by Neil Simon, starring Matthew Broderick
- A Sense of Humor (1983) – written by Ernest Thompson, starring Jack Lemmon, Estelle Parsons and Polly Holliday
- Biloxi Blues (1984) – written by Neil Simon, starring Matthew Broderick
- Legends! (1986) – written by James Kirkwood, starring Mary Martin and Carol Channing
- Proposals (1997) – directed by Joe Mantello
- Curtains (2006) – Book by Rupert Holmes, Music by John Kander, Lyrics by Fred Ebb, Directed by Scott Ellis
- 9 to 5 (2008) - Book by Patricia Resnick, Music and Lyrics by Dolly Parton, Directed by Joe Mantello
- Minsky's (2009) – Book by Bob Martin, Music by Charles Strouse and Lyrics by Susan Birkenhead
- Soft Power (2019) - Book and Lyrics by David Henry Hwang, Music and Additional Lyrics by Jeanine Tesori

== Awards and nominations ==
Awards	Production	Nominations	Wins	Notes
1998 Ovation Awards	An Enemy of the People	3	1	Won for Scenic Design (John Napier)
2009 Ovation Awards	9 to 5: The Musical	7	0	
2009 Ovation Awards	Minsky's	5	0	
2011 Ovation Awards	Leap of Faith	1	1	Won for Lead Actor (Raúl Esparza)
2012 Ovation Awards	War Horse	1	1	Won for Best Presented Production
2012 Ovation Awards	Follies	1	0	
2013 Ovation Awards	The Scottsboro Boys	1	1	Won for Best Presented Production
2013 Ovation Awards	Anything Goes	1	0	
2019 Ovation Awards	Soft Power	11	6	
