= Peace in Our Time (play) =

Play written by Noël Coward

Act II, Scene 1: Archie Jenkins (John Molecey), Mr Grainger (Trevor Ward), Alfie Blake (Brian Carey), Janet Braid (Elspeth March), Mrs Grainger (Sybil Wise), Alma Boughton (Helen Horsey), Mr. Lawrence (George Lane), Nora Shattock (Beatrice Varley), Fred Shattock (Bernard Lee) and Doris Shattock (Maureen Pryor)

Peace in Our Time is a two-act play written in 1946 by Noël Coward. It is a work of alternative history, focusing on a group of Londoners in a pub close to Sloane Square, after Nazi Germany has won the Battle of Britain and successfully invaded and occupied the United Kingdom. The work takes inspiration from the real-life sufferings of French citizens during the German occupation of France, which Coward had followed closely.

The play was given a pre-London tryout in Brighton and first performed in the West End at the Lyric Theatre in 1947. The production was directed by Alan Webb under Coward's supervision; it starred performers who became well known including Kenneth More, Bernard Lee, Elspeth March, and Maureen Pryor. Later in the year the play moved to the Aldwych Theatre to complete its run.

The piece is unusual for its sombre tone, being considerably darker than the comedic approach of most of Coward's plays. It was only a moderate success at its first production, running for 167 performances, but has attracted some attention in later revivals.

== Background ==
Coward wrote that he conceived the idea for the play while in Paris shortly after the Liberation and end of Nazi occupation. He wrote, "The city itself seemed to be unchanging, physically at least untouched by the horrors of enemy occupation. It didn't take me long however to realise that, behind the facade, a great deal had changed; the sense of immediate relief had faded, and there was an atmosphere of subtle disintegration, lassitude and above all suspicion". This led him to wonder "what would have happened to London and England if, in 1940, the Germans had successfully invaded and occupied us, which they so very nearly did". He decided to place the entire action of the play in the bar-parlour of a London pub, as "the most easily manageable meeting-ground for various types of Londoners".

Coward was implacably anti-Nazi; he had despised pre-war appeasers, headed the British propaganda office in Paris until the city fell to the Germans, and was discovered to have been on the Gestapo's list of prominent public figures to be liquidated had the Germans taken Britain. The play takes its title from a popular misquotation: the pre-war British prime minister, Neville Chamberlain proclaimed after meeting Adolf Hitler at the Munich Conference of 1938, "I believe it is peace for our time". The phrase was frequently quoted as "peace in our time". (Note: The phrase "Give peace in our time, O Lord" was familiar in Britain from the Anglican Book of Common Prayer.) Coward was advised not to use the phrase for his title, but as his biographer Cole Lesley put it, "Of course he used it, only too delighted to do anything which might anger the pro-Munich lot".

The play was put into rehearsal in 1947. Coward wanted a cast of fresh new talent, and auditioned numerous rising actors including Kenneth More, who accepted a part, and Dirk Bogarde, who did not. Peace in Our Time opened at the Theatre Royal, Brighton on 15 July 1947. The audience gave it an enthusiastic welcome, and it seemed as though Coward had a hit on his hands. Nevertheless, before the London opening Coward revised the text extensively. The play opened at the Lyric Theatre in Shaftesbury Avenue on 22 July. The first night audience received the play with acclaim, but the reviews were generally unfavourable, and Peace in Our Time was not among Coward's longer-running plays. It transferred from the Lyric to the Aldwych Theatre on 29 September and closed in December after a total of 167 performances.

== Roles and original London cast ==
- Alma Boughton – Helen Horsey
- Fred Shattock – Bernard Lee
- Janet Braid – Elspeth March
- Doris Shattock – Maureen Pryor
- Mr Grainger – Trevor Ward
- Mrs Grainger – Sybil Wise
- Nora Shattock – Beatrice Varley
- Lyia Vivian – Hazel Terry
- George Bourne – Kenneth More
- A man – Douglas Vine
- A woman – Stella Chapman
- Chorley Bannister – Olaf Pooley
- Bobby Plaxton – Derek Aylward
- Albrecht Richter – Ralph Michael
- Phyllis Mere – Dora Bryan
- Mr Lawrence – George Lane
- Maudie – Irene Relph
- Gladys Mott – Daphne Maddox
- Alfie Blake – Brian Carey
- German soldier – Charles Russell
- Herr Huberman – Richard Scott
- Frau Huberman – Betty Woolfe
- First SS guard – Anthony Peek
- Second SS guard – William Murray
- Billy Grainger – Philip Guard
- Doctor Venning – Michael Kent
- Ben Capper – Manfred Priestley
- Lily Blake – Dandy Nichols
- Mr Williams – William Murray
- Stevie Shattock – Alan Badel
- Archie Jenkins – John Molecey
- Kurt Forster – Michael Anthony
- Mrs Massiter – Janet Barrow
- Young German soldier – Anthony Peek
- Third SS guard – Peter Drury
- Fourth SS guard – Douglas Vine

Source: Mander and Mitchenson.

== Synopsis ==
The play is in two acts of four scenes each. The setting is the saloon bar of a London public house called The Shy Gazelle, somewhere between Knightsbridge and Sloane Square.

=== Act I ===
The time is November 1940. Britain has been conquered and occupied by Nazi Germany. The Shattock family run the Shy Gazelle, with a clientele mostly of locals. The latter are in general ordinary British people, resentful of German occupation but, to varying degrees, resigned to it. One, Chorley Bannister runs a highbrow magazine and is rightly seen as being too ready to collaborate with the Nazis.

A handsome and well-dressed German, Albrecht Richter, comes into the bar and is cold-shouldered by the other customers. He leaves after one drink. Bannister warns the others that "a little toleration" of the occupiers is simple common sense. Others disagree, and condemn cowardly expediency.

The second scene takes place in June 1941. News of events in Britain, on the radio and reported by customers, include the shooting of Winston Churchill, the State Opening of Parliament by Hitler, an attack on a German officer near the pub and the arrest of a local Jewish tailor by the SS. Richter establishes a friendly relationship with Bannister. Others remain politely hostile, in varying degrees. The most hostile suspect others of being too ready to collaborate.

Scenes 3 and 4 are set in early 1942. The pub's supplies of whisky are running low, but the Shattocks decline Richter's offer to obtain supplies for them. After the pub has closed, Billy Grainger, son of two of the regulars, staggers in. He has escaped from a Nazi prison camp. Dr Venning (another resistance member) is summoned, and takes Billy away to hide him. The Shattocks' son, Stephen, subsequently appears briefly: he is also on the run from the Germans. It emerges that he and his sister Doris are active in the resistance movement.

=== Act II ===
It is 1945. The tide of the war has turned. The liberation of France continues and Germany has been defeated at sea. The cellar of the pub has been turned into a base for the resistance. Bannister discovers this, and rushes out. Subsequently, Richter, with two SS guards, comes to arrest Doris. Three days later her broken and dying body is brought back to the pub: as she dies she says she told the Germans nothing. Two months later the British liberation is in full swing. Some of the regulars abduct Richter and bring him in. They tie him to a chair and tell him he is to be "liquidated" for his murder of Doris. (Note: In the original version of the play, seen in Brighton, it was the quisling informant, Bannister, who suffered this fate.) Learning that the Germans are coming to rescue him, they put his chair immediately behind the locked door; he is riddled with bullets by his comrades as they shoot the door down. The regulars and the Shattocks escape through the back door while the radio is heard announcing that the liberation is nearly complete.

Source: Mander and Mitchenson.

== Critical reception ==
Harold Hobson in The Sunday Times praised the play, and in The Daily Telegraph, W. A. Darlington wrote, "This play cannot possibly fail. It is too moving, too exciting, too deft – and too timely. We need to be reminded, just now, that we are people of spirit". They were in a minority of the critics, most of whom wrote lukewarm or hostile reviews. Some, including Graham Greene were suspected of resenting Coward's depiction of left-wing journalists who collaborated too readily with the Nazis, but other critics, then and later, thought Coward's treatment of the theme fell between two stools: not profound, but not witty enough to make its point by satire.

In the assessment of Coward's biographer Philip Hoare, the writer had uncharacteristically misjudged his moment:

The British public did not want to be reminded of years of deprivation and war; the depressing picture of a defeated people undergoing shortages and domination was all too close to the truth, since Britain was still suffering from austerity and rationing. His audiences expected the escapism of his late war films, Brief Encounter and Blithe Spirit … he had not delivered the goods.

A 2014 article in the magazine Houstonia after the Houston revival detailed below, judged that the play explored interesting dramatic questions while still maintaining a close feeling of realism, such as how frustratingly "characters grumble about the indignity of foreign occupation, including food and drink rationing". Questions of loyalty and friendship versus survival remained compelling.

== Adaptations and revivals ==
The play has (as of 2020) never been staged on Broadway or revived in the West End. The large cast makes it a difficult undertaking from a commercial standpoint. Productions include that at the off West End King's Head Theatre (1989), a UK tour by the Touring Partnership (1995), the Bristol Old Vic Theatre School (2006) and the Main Street Theater company in Houston (2014).

The only broadcast adaptation listed by the BBC is a 1947 version by Ayton Whitaker, using the cast of the original production.

== See also ==
- Hypothetical Axis victory in World War II
- Cultural impact of Noël Coward
- List of plays by Coward

== Sources ==
- Coward, Noël (1994). Plays, Seven. Sheridan Morley (introduction). London: Methuen. ISBN 978-0-413-73400-6.
- Hoare, Philip (1995). Noël Coward, A Biography. London: Sinclair-Stevenson. ISBN 978-1-4081-0675-4.
- Lesley, Cole (1976). The Life of Noël Coward. London: Cape. ISBN 978-0-224-01288-1.
- Mander, Raymond; Joe Mitchenson (1957). Theatrical Companion to Coward. London: Rockliff. OCLC 470106222.
