= Celebration Theatre =

Theatre company in Los Angeles

- Formation: 1982
- Type: Theatre group
- Location(s): 6760 Lexington Ave. Los Angeles, CA 90038
- Notable members: Chris Maikish, Executive Director; Brittney S. Wheeler, Artistic Director; Nathan Frizzell, Associate Artistic Director
- Website: www.celebrationtheatre.com

The Celebration Theatre is a 501(c)(3) non-profit theatre company in Los Angeles, founded in 1982. The company is located in West Hollywood, on the west end of Theatre Row, and specializes in works representing the LGBTQ+ experience.

== History ==
Celebration Theatre was founded in 1982 by Charles Rowland, who leased a storefront in the Silver Lake area of Los Angeles, to start a company dedicated to producing gay-themed material.

In 1993, Robert Schrock took over as artistic director and moved the company to a 99-seat Equity waiver space in West Hollywood. After 6 years of service, Schrock resigned from the position on April 1, 1999. Since then, the theatre has seen numerous individuals assume its role of artistic director. In June of 1999, Celebration Theatre announced that Richard Israel from the West Coast Ensemble Theatre would serve as its artistic director.

From December 2000 to 2005, the role of artistic director was filled by Derek Charles Livingston. In 2005, it was passed onto Michael Matthews who held on to the position until 2008. In 2008, Michael A. Shepperd became artistic director. In August of 2011, the theatre announced that its associate artistic director, John Michael Beck would succeed Shepperd as artistic director. By early January 2013, the theatre announced that Matthews and Shepperd would return as co-artistic directors. In May 2021, the Board of Directors at Celebration Theatre terminated Shepperd following allegations of sexual misconduct which were raised by an actor who had a role in one of Shepperd's productions.

As of September 2023, the artistic director position is held by Brittney S. Wheeler, alongside Nathan Frizzell who is its associate artistic director.

In the 2023-2024 season, the theatre operated as a guest resident at the Los Angeles LGBT Center.

== Awards ==
- R. Christofer Sands, 2002 Ovation Award - Lead Actor in a Musical, Pinafore!
- Play it Cool, 2005-2006 Ovation nomination - World Premiere Musical
- Jessica Sheridan, 2006 Ovation nomination - Lead Actress in a Musical, Play it Cool
- Louis Durra, 2006 Ovation nomination - Musical Direction, Play it Cool
- The Bacchae, 2007 Ovation nomination - Play Production, Intimate Theatre
- Beautiful Thing, 2007 Ovation nomination - Play Production, Intimate Theatre
- Michael Matthews, 2007 Ovation nomination - Direction of a Play, The Bacchae
- Michael Matthews, 2007 Ovation nomination - Direction of a Play, Beautiful Thing
- Tim Swiss, 2007 Ovation nomination - Lighting Design, Intimate Theatre, The Bacchae
- Cricket Myers, 2007 Ovation nomination - Sound Design, Intimate Theatre, The Bacchae
- Francesca Casale, 2008 Ovation nominee - Featured Actress in a Play, The Fastest Clock in the Universe
- Jennifer R. Blake, 2010 Outstanding Performance by a Lead Actress in a Musical for the role of Susan in [title of show] from StagesceneLA's Best of LA Theatre Awards 2009-2010
- Women of Brewster Place, the Musical, 2010 Ovation Award - Best Production of A Musical, Intimate Theatre
- Michael Matthews, 2010 Ovation nomination - Best Director of A Musical, Women of Brewster Place, the Musical
- Ameenah Kaplan, 2010 Ovation nomination - Best Choreographer, Women of Brewster Place, the Musical
- Women of Brewster Place, the Musical, 2010 Ovation award - Best Acting Ensemble
- Michael Matthews, 2011 Ovation Nomination, Director of a Play Intimate Theatre, Take Me Out
- Brian Pugach, 2011 Ovation Nomination, Book for an Original Musical, The Next Fairy Tale
- BASH'd! A Gay Rap Opera, 2011 Ovation Nomination, Best Musical Intimate Theatre
- Ameenah Kaplan, 2011 Ovation Nomination, Director of a Musical, BASH'd! A Gay Rap Opera
- DJ Jedi, 2011 Ovation Nomination, Music Direction, BASH'd! A Gay Rap Opera
- 2010/2011 Best Season Ovation Nomination
- 2012 GLAAD Media Award: Outstanding Los Angeles Theater for The Color Purple
- 2012 LA Weekly Theater Award: Multiple nominations including for The Color Purple
- 2013 LA Stage Alliance Ovation Awards: Nominations for productions including The Color Purple and Take Me Out
- 2014 GLAAD Media Award: Nomination for The Boy from Oz
- 2014 LA Stage Alliance Ovation Awards: Nominations and wins for various productions
- 2015 LA Weekly Theater Award: Wins for Bootycandy
- 2015 Los Angeles Drama Critics Circle Award: Wins for multiple productions
- 2016 Ovation Awards: Nominations and wins for productions including Dream Boy
- 2016 Back Stage Garland Awards: Wins for The Boy from Oz
- 2017 GLAAD Media Award: Nomination for Priscilla, Queen of the Desert
- 2017 LA Stage Alliance Ovation Awards: Wins for Priscilla, Queen of the Desert
- 2018 Center Theatre Group’s Block Party: Selected for Die, Mommie, Die
- 2019 Los Angeles Drama Critics Circle Award: Wins for various productions
- 2022 Los Angeles Drama Critics Circle Award: Wins for Buyer & Cellar
- 2023 Celebration Honors: Del Shores: An awards gala recognizing significant contributions to LGBTQIA+ theatre

== Past Productions ==
- Tales of the Transcestors: The Divine. Written by Azad Namazie, Blaire Battle, and Kaila Tacazon. Directed by Nico Pang. December 12 2024 - December 14 2024
- Fauci and Kramer, Written by Drew Fornarola. Directed by Khanisha Foster. November 2, 2024 - November 2, 2024
- A New Brain, by William Finn & James Lapine. Directed by Khanisha Foster. April 29, 2023 - June 23, 2023
- Indigiqueer Identity: Reclaiming Past, Present, and Future Directed and produced by Carolina Hoyos Original work written and performed by Jean Decay, Samantha Bowling, Honokee Dunn, Carolina Hoyos. December 27 2021 - February 28 2022
- The Boy from Oz, Music and Lyrics by Peter Allen. Book by Martin Sherman and Nick Enright. Directed by Michael A. Shepperd. April 29, 2016
- Dream Boy, by Eric Rosen, Based on the novel by Jim Grimsley. Directed by Michael Matthews. January 29, 2016 - March 2016
- Bootycandy, by Robert O'Hara, Directed by Michael Matthews, - October 29, 2015 - December, 2015
- Stories I Can't Tell Mama, Written and Performed by Leslie Jordan, January/February 2012
- Christmastime is Queer 4 more holiday mirth & mary-ment, December 9, 2011 - December 18, 2011
- What's Wrong with Angry?, Written by Patrick Wilde, Directed by Michael Matthews, - September 9, 2011 - Nov 19, 2011
- BASH'd! A Gay Rap Opera, Written by Chris Craddock and Nathan Cuckow, Directed by Ameenah Kaplan - June 10, 2011 - July 30, 2011
- The Next Fairy Tale, Book, Music and Lyrics by Brian Pugach, Directed by Michael A.Shepperd - March 11, 2011 - May 21, 2011
- Take Me Out, by Richard Greenberg, Directed by Michael Matthews - September 24, 2010 - February 19, 2011
- Title of Show, Book by Hunter Bell, Music and Lyrics by Jeff Bowen, Directed by Michael A.Shepperd - July 16 - September 11, 2010. In the cast were: Jennifer R. Blake, Carey Peters, Jeffrey Landman, Micah McCain, and Gregory Nabours.
- Women of Brewster Place, the Musical, Book, Music and Lyrics by Tim Acito, Directed by Michael Matthews - April 23 - June 27, 2010
- Haram Iran, by Jay Paul Deratany, Directed by Michael Matthews - March 5 - April 4, 2010
- Fucking Men, by Joe DiPietro, Directed by Calvin Remsberg - January 8 - February 14, 2010
- Women Behind Bars, by Tom Eyen, Directed by Kurt Koehler - November 13 - December 20, 2009
- Fucking Men, Book by Joe DiPietro, Directed by Calvin Remsberg - September 11 - November, 2009
- Altar Boyz, Book by Kevin Del Aguila, Music and Lyrics by Gary Adler and Michael Patrick Walker, Directed by Patrick Pearson - July 10 - August 23, 2009
- Trafficking in Broken Hearts, Written by Edwin Sanchez, Directed by Efrain Schunior - May 15 - June 14, 2009
- The Prodigal Father, Written by Larry Dean Harris, Directed by Michael Matthews - March 27 - April 26, 2009
- Missionary Position, Written and Performed by Steven Fales - January 9 - February 22, 2009
- The Daddy Machine, Book by Patricia Laughrey, Music and Lyrics by Rayme Sciaroni - October 18 - December 20, 2008
- A Christmas Carol, Adapted by Jason Moyer, Directed by Michael A. Shepperd - November 28 - December 21, 2008
- Porcelain, by Chay Yew, Directed by Michael Matthews - October 10 - November 16, 2008
- Sissystrata, by Allain Rochel, Directed by Michael Matthews - August - September 28, 2008
- Songs from an Unmade Bed, Lyrics by Mark Campbell, Directed by Patrick Pearson - June 6 - August 10, 2008
- Coffee will make you Black, Book by April Sinclair Adapted by Michael A. Shepperd, Directed by Nataki Garrett - April - May 25, 2008
- Stupid Kids, by John C. Russell, Directed by Michael Matthews - February - April 6, 2008
- The Fastest Clock in the Universe, by Philip Ridley, Directed by Lynn Ann Bernatowicz - October 12 - November 18, 2007
