= Sweet Nothing in My Ear (play) =

Play by Stephen Sachs

Sweet Nothing in My Ear is a two-act play written by American playwright Stephen Sachs in 1998. The play features both deaf and hearing characters, using a blend of spoken English and American Sign Language. The play's storyline revolves around six primary characters, each representing a distinct perspective and experience, and features four additional company members who alternate between voice-acting the signed lines and signing the spoken ones. This unique and inclusive technique ensures that the dialogue is accessible to both deaf and hearing audiences.

== Plot ==
The play explores the lives and family dynamic of Laura (a deaf teacher), Dan (her hearing husband), and Adam (their deaf son). Other featured characters include Laura's parents, Max and Sally, and the therapist Dr. Walters, all of whom are deaf. The central action of the play concerns Dan and Laura's struggle to decide whether their son Adam should receive a Cochlear implant. The play deals with themes of deaf pride, the challenges faced by the deaf community while navigating in the hearing world, the significance of language and communication, and the preservation of deaf culture.

== Cast ==
The original production of Sweet Nothing in My Ear was directed by Stephen Sachs. Produced by Deborah Lawlor and Jesica Korbman, the play premiered at The Fountain Theatre in Los Angeles in June 1997. Set design was provided by Tim Farmer and Mark Henderson; costume design was by Mariel McEwan, lighting design was by J. Kent Inasy; slide projections were created by Evan Mower; and the production stage manager was Jesica Korbman.

The cast included:

- Laura - Terrylene Sacchetti - Voice by Jennifer Massey
- Dan - Bob Kirsh - Voice by John Benitz
- Adam - Gianni Manganelli - Voice by Elizabeth Barrett
- Max - Bernard Bragg - Voice by Cal Bartlet
- Sally - Freda Norman - Voice by Elizabeth Barrett
- Dr. Walters - Vikee Waltrip - Voice by Elizabeth Barrett

In March 1998, Sweet Nothing in My Ear was produced at the Victory Gardens Theater in Chicago through the collaboration of Simon Levy, The Fountain Theatre and MT Productions. Stephen Sachs again directed, ensuring continuity of the creative vision. The creative team included set design by Sets to Go, costume design by Kristine Knanishu; lighting design by Joel Moritz; sound design by Lindsay Jones; slide projections by Evan Mower; and Meredith Scott Brittain as production stage manager.

The cast included:

- Laura - Liz Tannebaum-Greco - Voice by Jennifer Massey
- Dan - Philip Lester - Voice by John Benitz
- Adam - George Scott Kartheiser - Voice by Elizabeth Barrett
- Max - Chuck Baird - Voice by Cal Bartlet
- Sally - Vikee Waltrip - Voice by Elizabeth Barrett
- Dr. Walters - Ralitsa - Voice by Elizabeth Barrett

== Film adaptation ==
A film adaptation of the play was released in 1998, directed by Joseph Sargent and adapted for the screen by the original author, Stephen Sachs. As in the play, the film uses dubbed voices whenever on-screen characters are signing.
