= 2011 Ovation Awards =

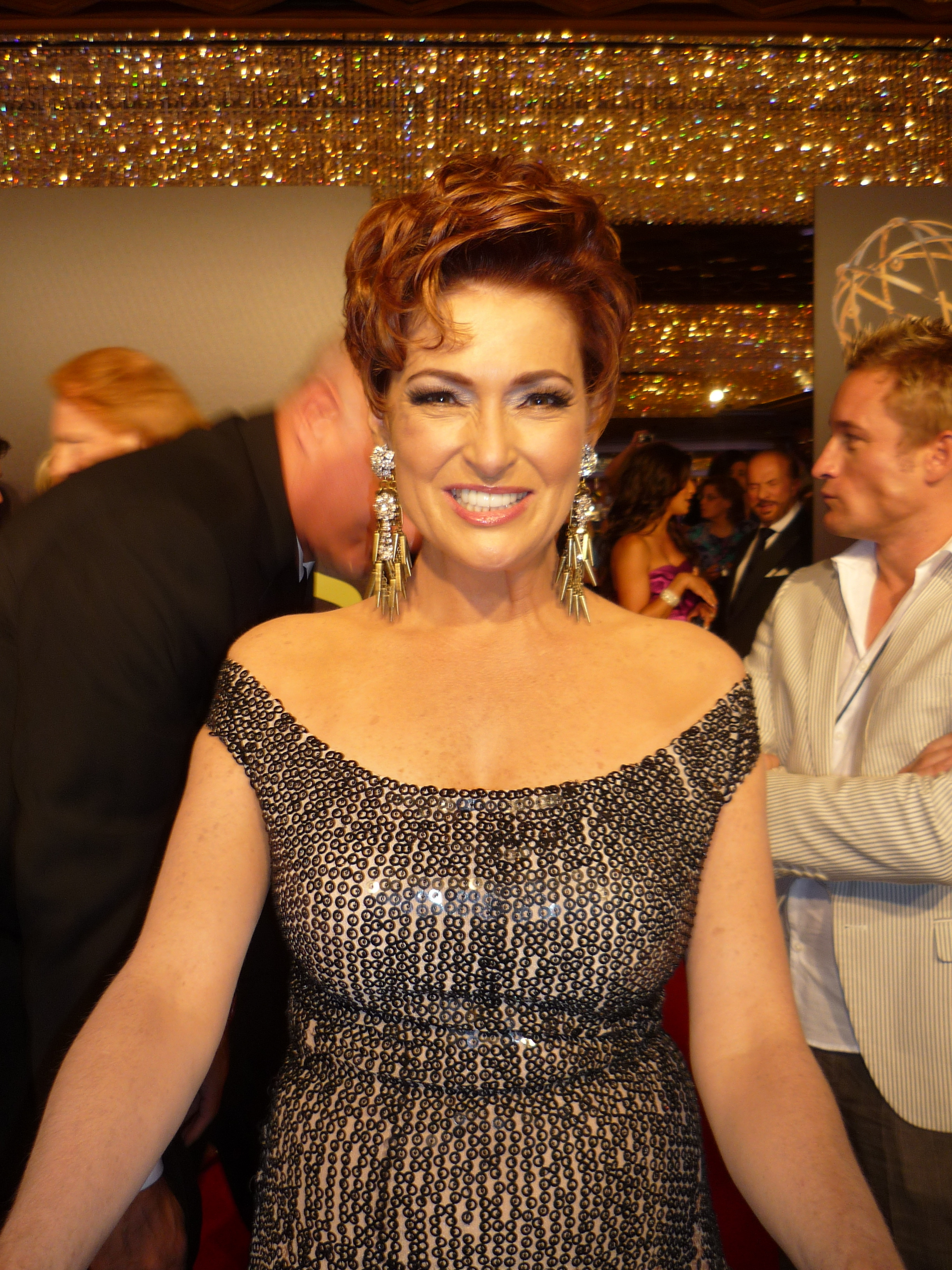
Carolyn Hennesy, Ceremony host

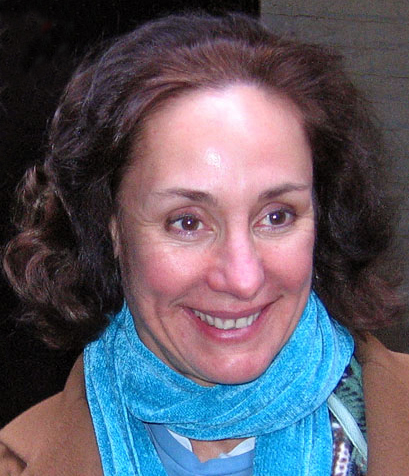
Laurie Metcalf, winner, Lead Actress in a Play

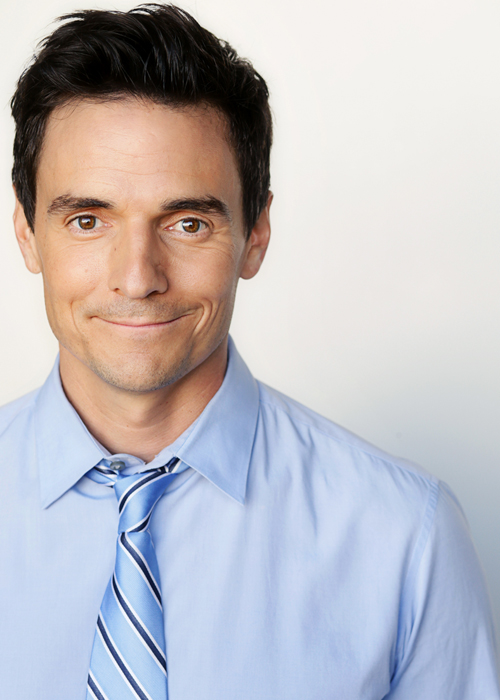
Henry Dittman, winner, Featured Actor in a Play

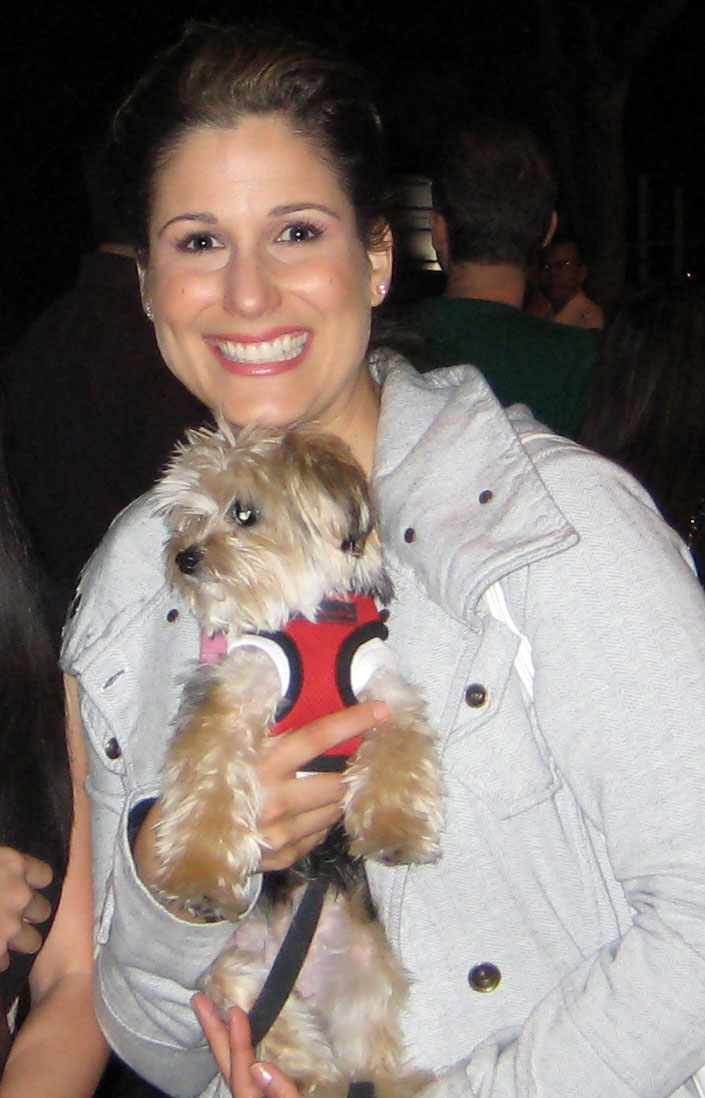
Stephanie J Block, nominee, Lead Actress in a Musical

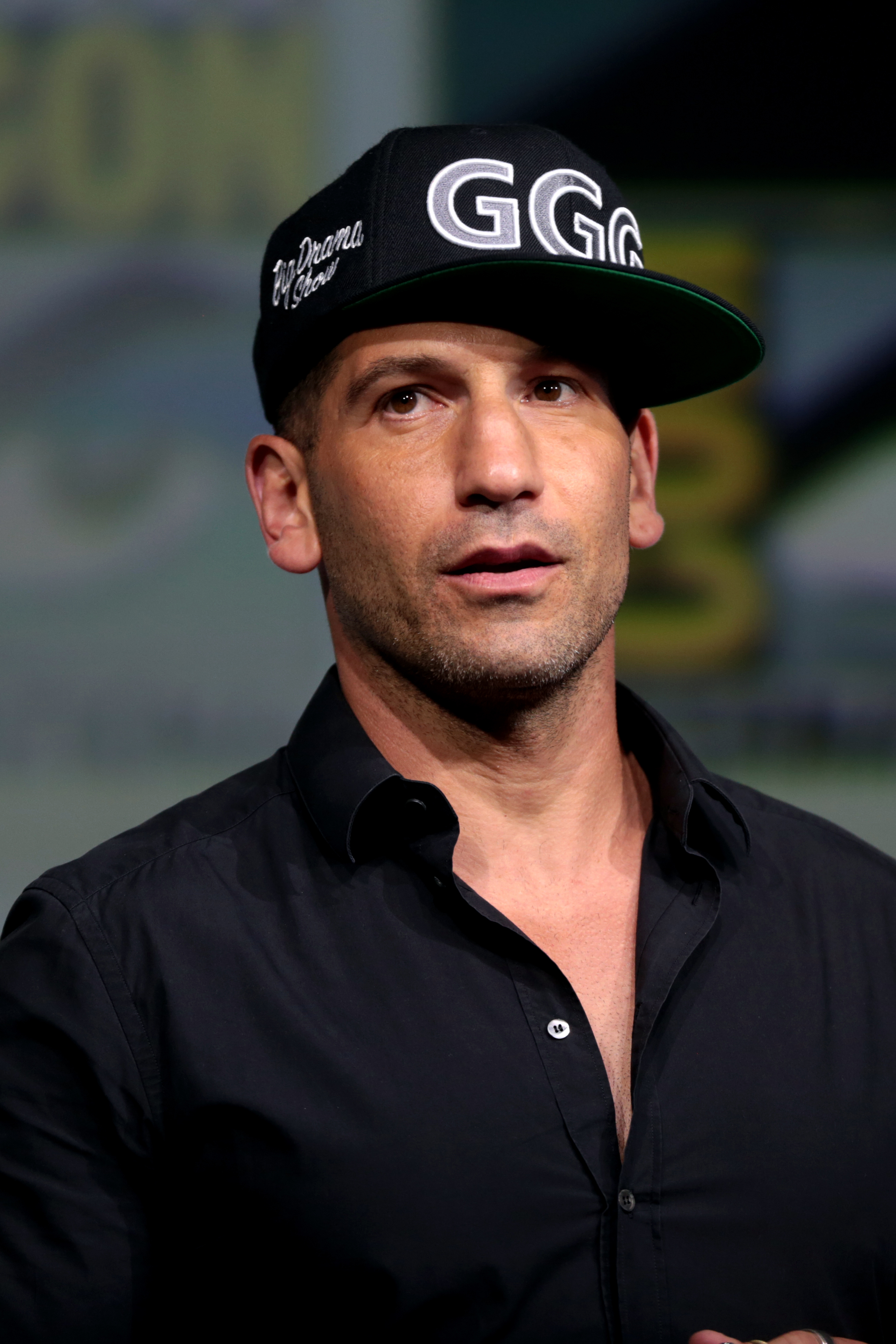
Jon Bernthal, nominee, Lead Actor in a Play

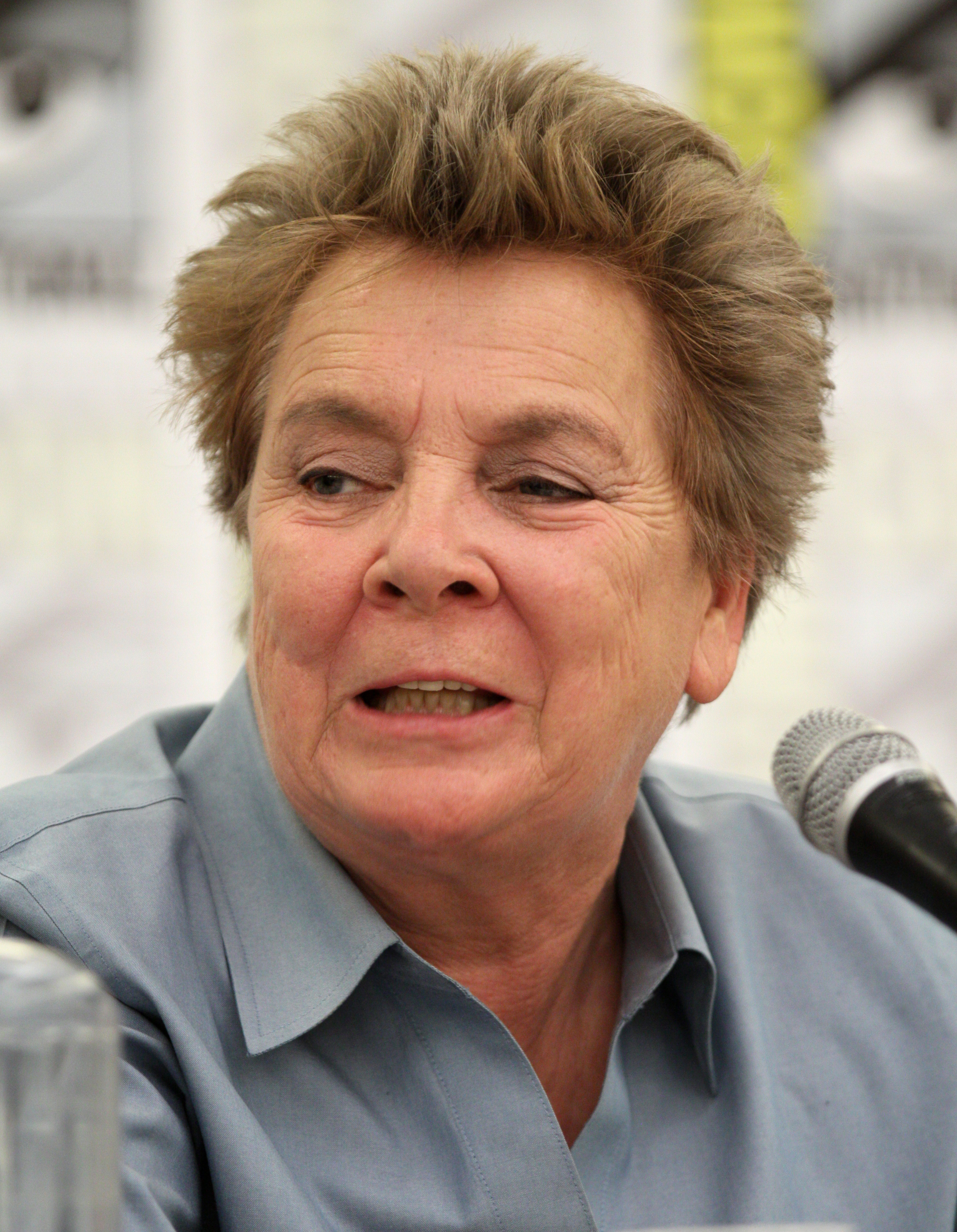
Sandy Martin, nominee, Lead Actress in a Play

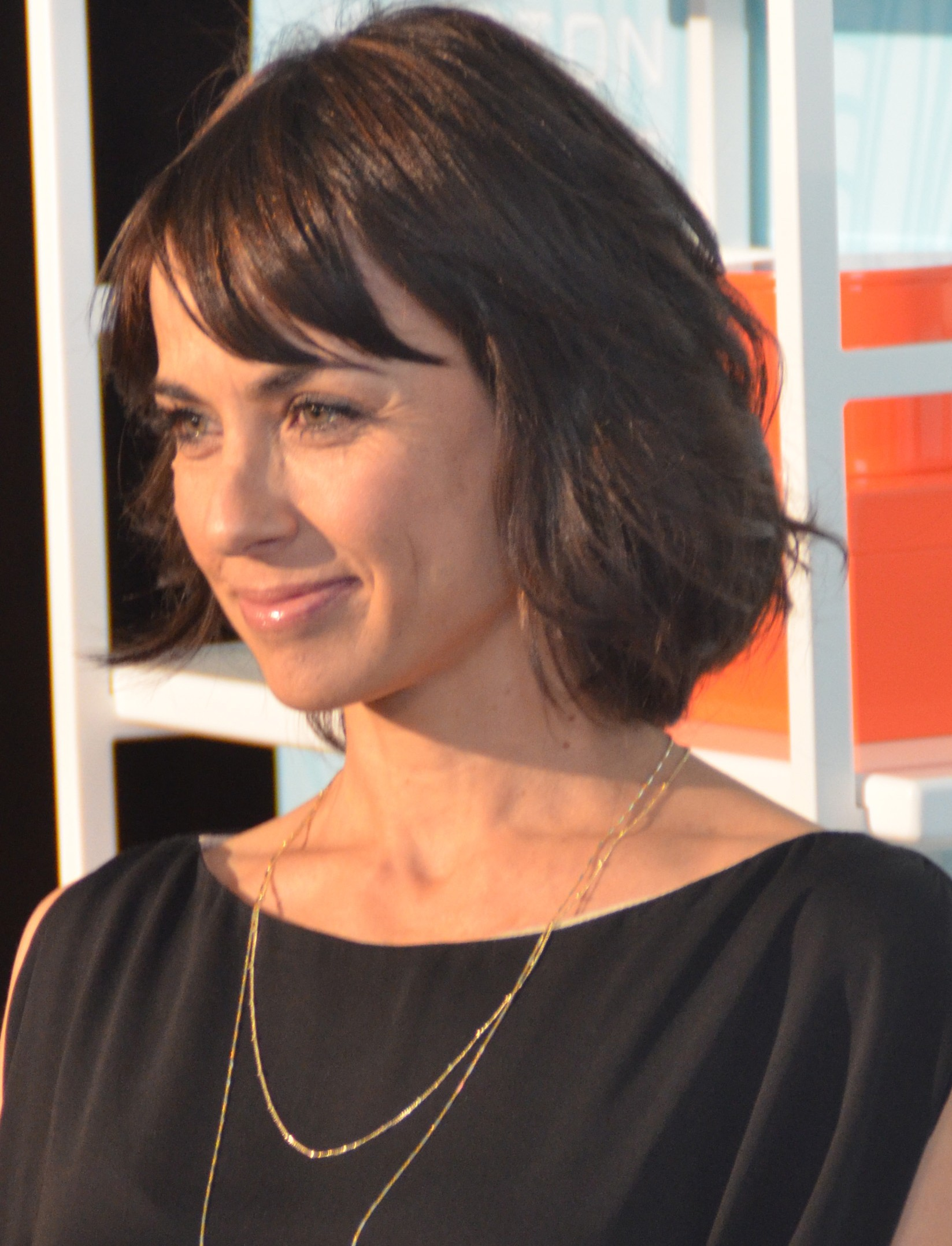
Constance Zimmer, nominee, Lead Actress in a Play

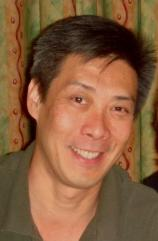
François Chau, nominee, Featured Actor in a Play

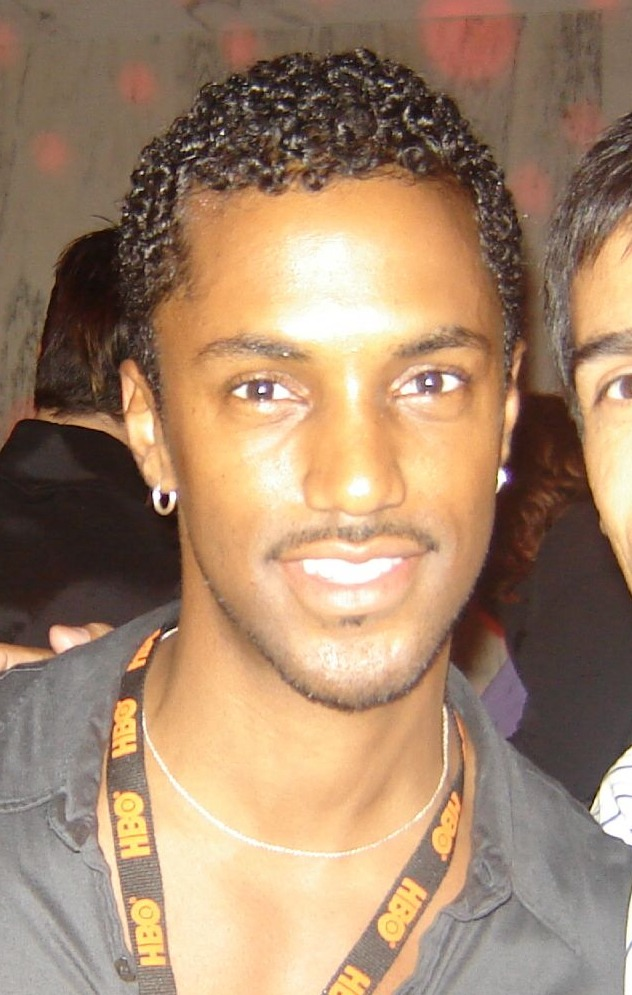
Darryl Stephens, nominee, Featured Actor in a Play

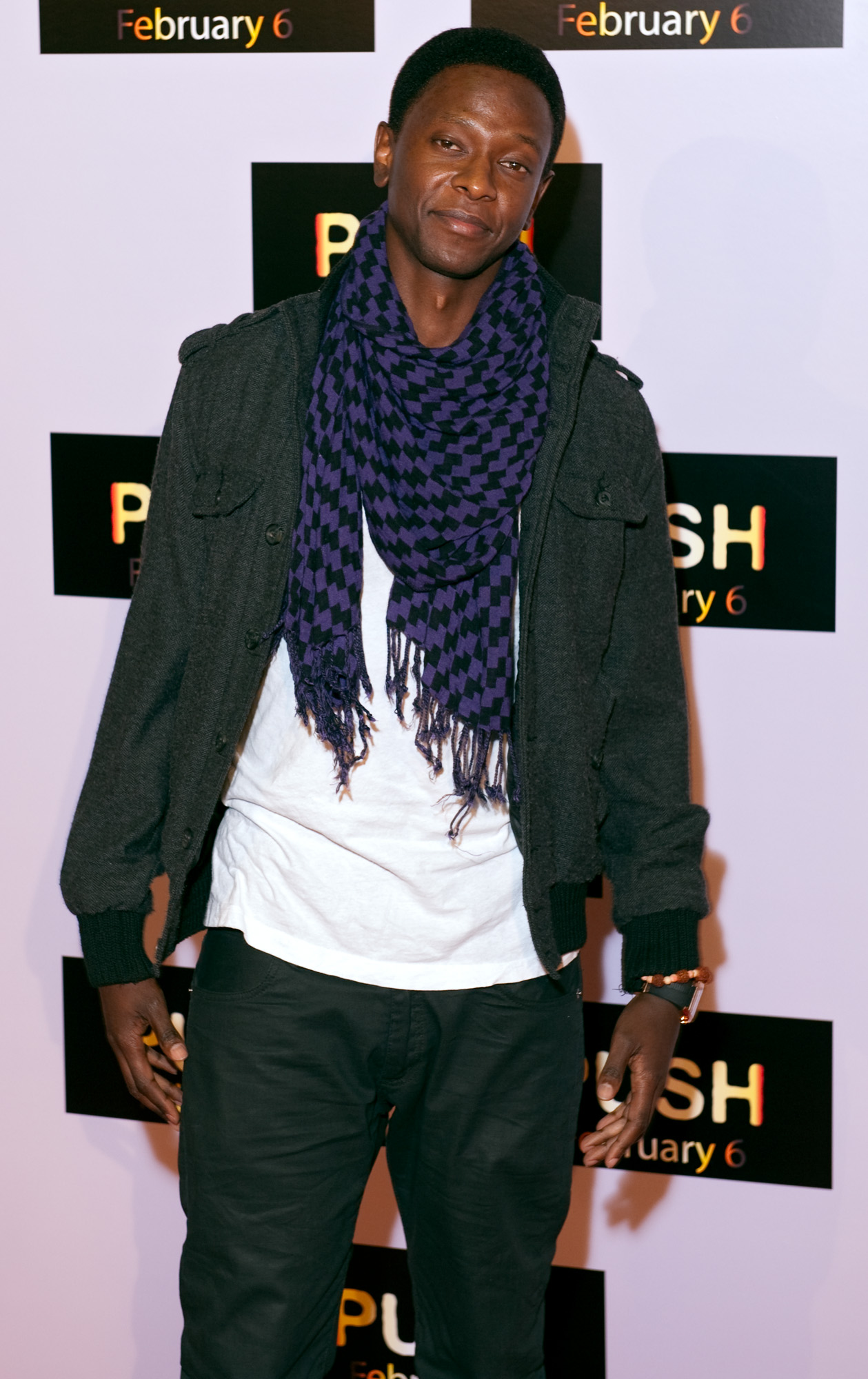
Edi Gathegi, nominee, Featured Actor in a Play

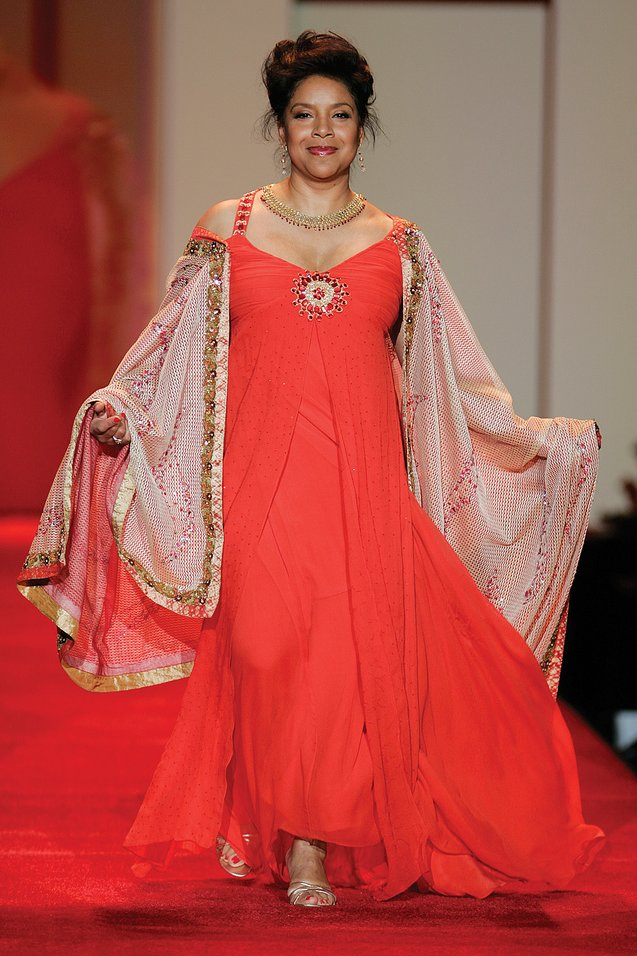
Phylicia Rashad, nominee, Director of a Play

The nominees for the 2011 Ovation Awards were announced on September 19, 2011, at the Falcon Theatre in Burbank, California. The awards were presented for excellence in stage productions in the Los Angeles area from September 2010 to August 2011 based upon evaluations from 250 members of the Los Angeles theater community.

The winners were announced on November 14, 2011 in a ceremony at the Orpheum Theatre in Downtown Los Angeles. The ceremony was hosted by actress Carolyn Hennesy.

== Awards ==
Winners are listed first and highlighted in boldface.

Best Production of a Musical (Intimate Theater)	Best Production of a Musical (Large Theater)
**Jerry Springer: The Opera – The Chance Theater**; BASH'd! A Gay Rap Opera – Celebration Theatre; Having It All – DEMAND Productions; Hoboken to Hollywood – Reasoner Associates LLC; Re-Animator: The Musical – Red Hen Productions & Schramm Group LLC	**Kiss Me, Kate – Reprise Theatre Company**; Fascinating Rhythms – Rubicon Theatre Company; The Sound of Music – Cabrillo Music Theatre; Venice – Center Theatre Group: Kirk Douglas Theatre; A Wither's Tale – Troubadour Theater Company
Best Production of a Play (Intimate Theater)	Best Production of a Play (Large Theater)
**Small Engine Repair – Rogue Machine Theatre**; Everything Will Be Different – Echo Theater Company; Hello – Crooked Arrow Productions; Nazi Hunter - Simon Wiesenthal – Theatre 40; Neighbors – The Matrix Theatre Company; Voice Lessons – Sacred Fools Theater Company; The War Cycle: Gospel According to First Squad – Los Angeles Theatre Ensemble	**A Raisin in the Sun – Ebony Repertory Theatre**; Extraordinary Chambers – Geffen Playhouse; "Master Harold"...and the Boys – Rubicon Theatre Company; Superior Donuts – Geffen Playhouse; Waiting for Lefty – Theatre West
Lead Actor in a Musical	Lead Actress in a Musical
**Raúl Esparza as Jonas Nightingale – Leap of Faith – Center Theatre Group: Ahmanson Theatre**; Alaman Diadhiou as Twist – Twist – An American Musical – Pasadena Playhouse; Luca Ellis as The Crooner – Hoboken to Hollywood – Reasoner Associates LLC; Tom Hewitt as Fred Graham/Petruchio – Kiss Me, Kate – Reprise Theatre Company; David Laffey as Jonathan Weirus/Satan – Jerry Springer: The Opera – The Chance Theater; Jesse Merlin as Dr. Hill – Re-Animator: The Musical – Red Hen Productions & Schramm Group LLC; Graham Skipper as Herbert West – Re-Animator: The Musical – Red Hen Productions & Schramm Group LLC	**Lesli Margherita as Lilli Vanessi/Kate – Kiss Me, Kate – Reprise Theatre Company**; Lindsey Alley as Sissy – Having It All – DEMAND Productions; Stephanie Block as Sonia Walsk – They're Playing Our Song – Reprise Theatre Company; Kim Huber as Lizzie – Having It All – DEMAND Productions; Kelli Provart as Grizabella – Cats – Musical Theatre West; Alet Taylor as Carly – Having It All – DEMAND Productions; Shannon Warne as Amy – Having It All – DEMAND Productions
Lead Actor in a Play	Lead Actress in a Play
**Stefan Marks as Clark – Hello – Crooked Arrow Productions**; Obba Babatundé as Waters – A Soldier's Play – Malibu Stage Company; Jon Bernthal as Terence Swaino – Small Engine Repair – Rogue Machine Theatre; Tom Dugan as Simon Wiesenthal – Nazi Hunter - Simon Wiesenthal – Theatre 40; Joe Fria as Sherlock Holmes – Watson – The Last Great Tale of the Legendary Sherlock Holmes – Sacred Fools Theater Company; Anthony J. Haney as Sam – "Master Harold"...and the Boys – Rubicon Theatre Company; French Stewart as Nate – Voice Lessons – Sacred Fools Theater Company	**Laurie Metcalf as Virginia – Voice Lessons – Sacred Fools Theater Company**; Susan Claassen as Edith Head – A Conversation With Edith Head – El Portal Theatre; Alana Dietze as Charlotte – Everything Will Be Different – Echo Theater Company; Diarra Kilpatrick as Lou – The Interlopers – Bootleg Theatre; Sandy Martin as Bella McCorkle – A House Not Meant to Stand – Fountain Theatre; Beth Patrik as Alice – Hello – Crooked Arrow Productions; Constance Zimmer as Claire – Girls Talk – DEMAND Productions
Featured Actor in a Musical	Featured Actress in a Musical
**Matt Walker as Leontes/Clown – A Wither's Tale – Troubadour Theater Company**; Willem De Vries – Fascinating Rhythms – Rubicon Theatre Company; Sean Hingston as Bill Calhoun/Lucentio – Kiss Me, Kate – Reprise Theatre Company; Morgan Rusler as King Herod/Frankenstein – The First Jo-El – Troubadour Theater Company; Isaac Wade as Dr. Allen – Group: A Musical – Los Angeles Theatre Ensemble; Matt Walker as Joseph/Gold – The First Jo-El – Troubadour Theater Company; Jay Winnick as Man #1 – Kiss Me, Kate – Reprise Theatre Company	**Beth Kennedy as Paulina/Shepard – A Wither's Tale – Troubadour Theater Company**; Anya – Fascinating Rhythms – Rubicon Theatre Company; Meg Gillentine as Lois Lane/Bianca – Kiss Me, Kate – Reprise Theatre Company; Beth Kennedy as Hoffy/Virginia/Winter Warlock – The First Jo-El – Troubadour Theater Company; Katherine Malak as Perdita – A Wither's Tale – Troubadour Theater Company; Millicent Martin as Mamita – Gigi – Reprise Theatre Company; Victoria Platt as Emilia Monroe – Venice – Center Theatre Group: Kirk Douglas Theatre
Featured Actor in a Play	Featured Actress in a Play
**Henry Dittman as James Moriarty – Watson – The Last Great Tale of the Legendary Sherlock Holmes – Sacred Fools Theater Company**; François Chau as Dr. Heng – Extraordinary Chambers – Geffen Playhouse; Edi Gathegi as Franco Wicks – Superior Donuts – Geffen Playhouse; Michael Pappas as PFC Raasch – The War Cycle: Gospel According to First Squad – Los Angeles Theatre Ensemble; Darryl Stephens as Victoria – The Interlopers – Bootleg Theatre; French Stewart as Freud/Queen Victoria – Watson – The Last Great Tale of the Legendary Sherlock Holmes – Sacred Fools Theater Company; Greg Watanabe as Sopoan – Extraordinary Chambers – Geffen Playhouse	**Deidrie Henry as Ruth Younger – A Raisin in the Sun – Ebony Repertory Theatre**; Andrea Bendewald as Jane – Girls Talk – DEMAND Productions; Meredith Bishop as Natalie – Aftermath – Linda Toliver/Gary Guidinger; Anne Gee Byrd as Mrs. Ellis – The Autumn Garden – Antaeus Theatre Company; Vivian Kerr as Mary Warren – The Crucible – Theatre Banshee; Nicole Paggi as Scarlett – Girls Talk – DEMAND Productions; Daniele Watts as Topsy – Neighbors – The Matrix Theatre Company
Acting Ensemble of a Musical	Acting Ensemble for a Play
**The cast of A Wither's Tale – Troubadour Theater Company**; The cast of Having It All – DEMAND Productions; The cast of Jerry Springer: The Opera – The Chance Theater; The cast of Kiss Me, Kate – Reprise Theatre Company; The cast of Venice – Center Theatre Group: Kirk Douglas Theatre	**The cast of Small Engine Repair – Rogue Machine Theatre**; The cast of Everything Will Be Different – Echo Theater Company; The cast of Girls Talk – Demand Productions; The cast of Neighbors – The Matrix Theatre Company; The cast of A Raisin in the Sun – Ebony Repertory Theatre; The cast of Voice Lessons – Sacred Fools Theater Company; The cast of The War Cycle: Gospel According to First Squad – Los Angeles Theatre Ensemble
Director of a Musical	Director of a Play
**Matt Walker – A Wither's Tale – Troubadour Theater Company**; Trevor Biship – Jerry Springer: The Opera – The Chance Theater; Cate Caplin – Fascinating Rhythms – Rubicon Theatre Company; Ameenah Kaplan – BASH'd! A Gay Rap Opera – Celebration Theatre; Michael Michetti – Kiss Me, Kate – Reprise Theatre Company; Eric Rosen – Venice – Center Theatre Group: Kirk Douglas Theatre; Matt Walker – The First Jo-El – Troubadour Theater Company	**Andrew Block – Small Engine Repair – Rogue Machine Theatre**; Stefan Marks – Hello – Crooked Arrow Productions; Michael Matthews – Take Me Out – Celebration Theatre; Phylicia Rashad – A Raisin in the Sun – Ebony Repertory Theatre; Jaime Robledo – Watson – The Last Great Tale of the Legendary Sherlock Holmes – Sacred Fools Theater Company; Danika Sudik & Tom Burmester – The War Cycle: Gospel According to First Squad – Los Angeles Theatre Ensemble; Jenny Sullivan – Nazi Hunter - Simon Wiesenthal – Theatre 40
Music Direction	Choreography
**Paul Litteral – Hoboken to Hollywood – Reasoner Associates LLC**; Darryl Archibald – The Sound of Music – Cabrillo Music Theatre; Eric Heinly – A Wither's Tale – Troubadour Theater Company; DJ Jedi – BASH'd! A Gay Rap Opera – Celebration Theatre; Curtis Moore – Venice – Center Theatre Group: Kirk Douglas Theatre; Michael Paternostro – Kiss Me, Kate – Reprise Theatre Company; Mike Wilkins – Jerry Springer: The Opera – The Chance Theater	**Cate Caplin – Fascinating Rhythms – Rubicon Theatre Company**; Debbie Allen – Twist – An American Musical – Pasadena Playhouse; Molly Alvarez – The First Jo-El – Troubadour Theater Company; Jason Chong – Krunk Fu Battle Battle – East West Players; Ameenah Kaplan – A Wither's Tale – Troubadour Theater Company; Lee Martino – Kiss Me, Kate – Reprise Theatre Company; Kelly Todd – Jerry Springer: The Opera – The Chance Theater
Book for an Original Musical	Lyrics/Music for an Original Musical
**William Norris, Stuart Gordon & Dennis Paoli – Re-Animator: The Musical – Red Hen Productions & Schramm Group LLC**; David Goldsmith & Wendy Perelman – Having It All – DEMAND Productions; Brian Pugach – The Next Fairy Tale – Celebration Theatre	**Gregory Nabours – The Trouble with Words – Coeurage Theatre Company**; Mark Nutter – Re-Animator: The Musical – Red Hen Productions & Schramm Group LLC; Eric Rosen & Matt Sax – Venice – Center Theatre Group: Kirk Douglas Theatre
Playwrighting For An Original Play	Best Season
**Stefan Marks – Hello – Crooked Arrow Productions**; Tom Burmester – The War Cycle: Gospel According to First Squad – Los Angeles Theatre Ensemble; Donald Jolly – Bonded – Playwrights' Arena; Marja-Lewis Ryan – Dysnomia – Jessie Warner & Marja-Lewis Ryan; John Pollono – Small Engine Repair – Rogue Machine Theatre; Elliot Shoenman – Aftermath – Linda Toliver/Gary Guidinger; David Wiener – Extraordinary Chambers – Geffen Playhouse	**Troubadour Theater Company**; Celebration Theatre; Fountain Theatre; Reprise Theatre Company; Theatre Banshee
Lighting Design (Intimate Theater)	Lighting Design (Large Theater)
**Christopher Kuhl – How to Disappear Completely and Never Be Found – The Theatre @ Boston Court**; Ken Booth – A House Not Meant to Stand – Fountain Theatre; Ken Booth – The Train Driver – Fountain Theatre; Bosco Flanagan – Awake – Bootleg Theatre; Matt Richter – Skeleton Stories – Theatre Of NOTE; Matt Richter – Shoe Story – Theatre Of NOTE; Mark Svastics – Hello – Crooked Arrow Productions	**David Weiner – Venice – Center Theatre Group: Kirk Douglas Theatre**; Howell Binkley – Twist – An American Musical – Pasadena Playhouse; Elizabeth Harper – A Raisin in the Sun – Ebony Repertory Theatre; Paulie Jenkins – Moonlight & Magnolias – The Colony Theatre Company; Jeremy Pivnick – A Wither's Tale – Troubadour Theater Company; Jared Sayeg – Kiss Me, Kate – Reprise Theatre Company; Dan Weingarten – Krunk Fu Battle Battle – East West Players
Scenic Design (Intimate Theater)	Scenic Design (Large Theater)
**Joel Daavid – Skeleton Stories – Theatre Of NOTE**; Kurt Boetcher – Heavier Than... – The Theatre @ Boston Court; Tom Buderwitz – The Autumn Garden – The Antaeus Company; Joel Daavid – The Violet Hour – Hollywood Food Chain Productions; Jeff McLaughlin – Bakersfield Mist – Fountain Theatre; Jeff McLaughlin – The Train Driver – Fountain Theatre; Jeff McLaughlin – A House Not Meant to Stand – Fountain Theatre	**Todd Rosenthal – Twist – An American Musical – Pasadena Playhouse**; John Arnone – Superior Donuts – Geffen Playhouse; Tom Buderwitz – Kiss Me, Kate – Reprise Theatre Company; Michael Ganio – A Raisin in the Sun – Ebony Repertory Theatre; Stephen Gifford – The Clean House – International City Theatre; John Iacovelli – On Golden Pond – The Colony Theatre Company; Meghan Raham – Venice – Center Theatre Group: Kirk Douglas Theatre
Sound Design (Intimate Theater)	Sound Design (Large Theater)
**Alyssa Ishii – Awake – Bootleg Theater**; Peter Bayne – A House Not Meant to Stand – Fountain Theatre; Bryan Maier – Shoe Story – Theatre Of NOTE; David Marling – The Train Driver – Fountain Theatre; Mark McClain Wilson – Skeleton Stories – Theatre Of NOTE; John Zalewski – How to Disappear Completely and Never Be Found – The Theatre @ Boston Court; John Zalewski – Margo Veil – Odyssey Theatre Ensemble	**Joshua Horvath – Venice – Center Theatre Group: Kirk Douglas Theatre**; Philip Allen – Kiss Me, Kate – Reprise Theatre Company; Bob Blackburn – A Raisin in the Sun – Ebony Repertory Theatre; Jonathan Burke – The Sound of Music – Cabrillo Music Theatre; Kenny Hobbs – "Master Harold"...and the Boys – Rubicon Theatre Company; Vincent Olivieri – Extraordinary Chambers – Geffen Playhouse; Richard Woodbury – Superior Donuts – Geffen Playhouse
Costume Design (Intimate Theater)	Costume Design (Large Theater)
**A. Jeffrey Schoenberg – The Malcontent – The Antaeus Company**; Naila Alladin-Sanders – Neighbors – The Matrix Theatre Company; Ann Closs-Farley – Ken Roht's 99 Cent Only Same-O, An Electric Ballad – Bootleg Theater; Ann Closs-Farley – The Adventures of Pinocchio – Deaf West Theatre; Tina Haatainen-Jones – The Autumn Garden – The Antaeus Company; Shon Leblanc – The Violet Hour – Hollywood Food Chain Productions; Tifanie McQueen – Endgame – Sacred Fools Theater Company	**Emilio Sosa – Twist – An American Musical – Pasadena Playhouse**; Christa Armendariz – Beehive – The 1960s Girl Group Musical – Civic Light Opera Of South Bay Cities; Angela Calin – Great Expectations – A Noise Within; Ruth Carter – A Raisin in the Sun – Ebony Repertory Theatre; Garry Lennon – Kiss Me, Kate – Reprise Theatre Company; Sharon McGunigle – A Wither's Tale – Troubadour Theater Company; Meghan Raham – Venice – Center Theatre Group: Kirk Douglas Theatre

== Ovation Honors ==
Ovation Honors, which recognize outstanding achievement in areas that are not among the standard list of nomination categories, were presented when the nominations were announced.

- Composition for a Play – Brian Joseph, Lyle Lovett, Fred Sanders, Sara Watkins & Sean Watkins – Much Ado About Nothing – The Shakespeare Center Of Los Angeles
- Fight Choreography – Brian Danner – The Walworth Farce – Theatre Of NOTE
- Puppet Design – Kristopher Bicknell, Gwyneth Conaway Bennison & Miles Taber – D Is For Dog – Rogue Artists Ensemble
- Video Design – Jason Thompson – Venice – Center Theatre Group: Kirk Douglas Theatre
