= Equivocal =

Equivocal is the grammatical quality of ambiguity due to a term's having multiple meanings. It is the latin translation of the greek adjective "homonymous".

- Equivocation, in logic, a fallacy from using a phrase in multiple senses
- Equivocal generation, in biology, the disproven theory of spontaneous generation from a host organism

== See also ==
- Equivocation (disambiguation)
