= The Fountain Theatre =

Theater in Los Angeles, California, US

- Interactive map of The Fountain Theatre
- Address: 5060 Fountain Ave.
- Location: Los Angeles
- Coordinates: 34.095°N 118.300°W
- Type: Theatre

Website
- www.fountaintheatre.com

The Fountain Theatre is a theatre in Los Angeles. Along with its programming of live theatre, it's also the foremost producer of flamenco on the West Coast.

== History ==
The Fountain Theatre was founded in Los Angeles in 1990 by co-artistic directors Deborah Lawlor (wife of Robert Lawlor) and Stephen Sachs. Simon Levy, producing director and dramaturge, joined in 1993 as a resident director, producer, and playwright.

The Fountain Theatre's activities include a year-round season of fully produced new and established plays. It has mounted 35 world premieres and also 31 US, West-Coast, Southern-California, or Los Angeles premieres. The Fountain also offers a full season of multi-ethnic dance, being the foremost presenter of flamenco in Los Angeles, educational outreach programs, and national/international tours. Fountain Theatre projects have been seen in Los Angeles, New York City, San Francisco, Santa Barbara, Seattle, Chicago, Massachusetts, Florida, New Jersey, Minneapolis, London, and Edinburgh, among other cities and countries.

== Flamenco ==
The Fountain Theatre showcases flamenco every month, and is the foremost producer of flamenco on the West Coast.

The theatre is featured prominently in the 2011 documentary, Kumpanía: Flamenco Los Angeles. Live performances and interviews with flamenco dancers and musicians filmed in the theatre are presented, and co-artistic director Deborah Lawlor is also interviewed in the film.

== Awards and honors ==
Fountain Theatre productions have won more than 220 awards for all areas of production, performance, and design. The Fountain Theatre has received more nominations and won more awards than any other intimate theater in the history of the Ovation Awards.

The Fountain has been honored with a Certificate of Appreciation from the Los Angeles City Council for demonstrating years of artistic excellence and "enhancing the cultural life of Los Angeles". It was the recipient of the 2004 Hollywood Arts Council's "Charlie" Award for Live Theatre and Significant Artistic Contribution to Hollywood. In 2009, the LA Weekly named the Fountain Theatre as "one of the Best Theatre Companies of the Decade". In 2011, Broadway World said, "The Fountain Theatre is by the far the best and the brightest that Los Angeles has to offer." In 2012 the Wall Street Journal declared "The Fountain Theatre is one of this country's best intimate regional houses."

Awards	Production	Nominations	Wins	Notes
2009 Ovation Awards	Coming Home	2	0	
2009 Ovation Awards	Photograph 51	2	0	
2009 Ovation Awards	Gem of the Ocean	1	0	
2009 Ovation Awards		1	0	Nominated for Best Season
2010 Ovation Awards	The Ballad of Emmett Till	5	3	Won for Best Production, Acting Ensemble, and Director
2010 Ovation Awards	Opus	3	1	Won for Sound Design (Peter Bayne)
2010 Ovation Awards		1	1	Won award for Best Season
2011 Ovation Awards	A House Not Meant to Stand	4	0	
2011 Ovation Awards	The Train Driver	3	0	
2011 Ovation Awards	Bakersfield Mist	1	0	
2011 Ovation Awards		1	0	Nominated for Best Season
2012 Ovation Awards	Cyrano	2	0	
2013 Ovation Awards	In the Red and Brown Water	6	1	Won for Director of a Play (Shirley Jo Finney)
2013 Ovation Awards	On the Spectrum	1	1	Won for Video Design (Jeffrey Elias Teeter)
2013 Ovation Awards		1	0	Nominated for Best Season

== Productions ==
- The Normal Heart (2013) by Larry Kramer
- Heart Song (2013) by Stephen Sachs
- On the Spectrum (2013) by Ken LaZebnik
- In the Red and Brown Water (2012–2013) by Tarell Alvin McCraney
- The Blue Iris (2012) by Athol Fugard
- Cyrano (2012) by Edmond Rostand, adapted by Stephen Sachs
- El Nogalar (2012) by Tanya Saracho
- Bakersfield Mist (2011) by Stephen Sachs – an NNPN Rolling World Premiere
- A House Not Meant to Stand (2011) by Tennessee Williams
- The Train Driver (2010–2011) by Athol Fugard
- Opus (2010) by Michael Hollinger
- The Ballad of Emmett Till (2010) by Ifa Bayeza
- Shining City (2009) by Conor McPherson
- Coming Home (2009) by Athol Fugard
- The Accomplices (2009) by Bernard Weinraub; remounted at the Odyssey Theatre
- Photograph 51 (2009) by Anna Ziegler
- Gem of the Ocean (2009) by August Wilson
- The Accomplices (2008) by Bernard Weinraub
- And Her Hair Went With Her (2008) by Zina Camblin – an NNPN Rolling World Premiere
- Victory (2008) by Athol Fugard
- The Milk Train Doesn't Stop Here Anymore (2007) by Tennessee Williams
- Taking Flight (2007) by Adriana Sevan
- Sojourn at Ararat (2007) by Gerald Papasian and Nora Armani
- On the Couch with Nora Armani (2007) by Nora Armani
- Miss Julie (2007) by August Strindberg, adapted by Stephen Sachs
- Master Class (2007) by Terrence McNally at Santa Barbara Theatre
- Taxi to Jannah (2006) by Mark Sickman
- The Gimmick (2006) by Dael Orlandersmith
- Little Armenia (2006) by Lory Bedikian, Aram Kouyoumdjian, and Shahe Mankerian
- Joe Turner's Come and Gone (2006) by August Wilson
- What I Heard About Iraq (2005) adapted by Simon Levy
- Acts of Desire (2005) by Yussef El Guindi
- Yellowman (2005) by Dael Orlandersmith
- Exits and Entrances (2005) by Athol Fugard
- Daisy in the Dreamtime (2004) by Lynne Kaufman, at Inside the Ford Amphitheatre
- Master Class (2003–2004) by Terrence McNally
- Going to St. Ives (2003) by Lee Blessing
- After the Fall (2002) by Arthur Miller
- Central Avenue (2001) by Stephen Sachs
- Night of the Iguana (2000–2001) by Tennessee Williams
- The Darker Face of the Earth (2000) by Rita Dove

== Selected actors ==
- Alan Blumenfeld
- Seamus Dever
- Cameron Dye
- Bob Hiltermann
- Adam Huss
- Juanita Jennings
- Karen Kondazian
- Troy Kotsur
- Sandy Martin
- Tracy Middendorf
- Iona Morris
- Jenny O'Hara
- Lisa Pelikan
- Tonya Pinkins
- Larry Poindexter
- Priscilla Pointer
- Maya Lynne Robinson
- Jacqueline Schultz
- Esther Scott
- Malachi Throne
- Nick Ullett
- Karen Malina White
