= Marin Theatre Company =

Coordinates: 37.897297°N 122.536137°W

Marin Theatre is a 501(c)3 nonprofit organization and professional LORT D regional theater located in Mill Valley, California. Lance Gardner is the company's Artistic Director

Marin Theatre is home to the 231-seat Boyer Theatre and 99-seat Lieberman Studio Theatre. Notable past productions include the Bay Area premiere of Matthew Lopez's The Whipping Man, the 10th Anniversary revival of Suzan-Lori Parks's Pulitzer Prize for Drama-winning Topdog/Underdog, the Bay Area premiere of Annie Baker's Circle Mirror Transformation, the West Coast premiere of Keith Huff's A Steady Rain, the world premiere of Steve Yockey's Bellwether, the world premiere of Libby Appel's adaptation of Anton Chekhov's The Seagull, the world premiere of Bill Cain's 2011 Harold and Mimi Steinberg/American Theatre Critics Association New Play Award -winning 9 Circles, the West Coast premiere of Tarell Alvin McCraney's In the Red & Brown Water, and the Bay Area premiere of Bill Cain's 2010 Steinberg/ATCA New Play Award -winning Equivocation.

== History ==
Marin Theatre was founded in 1966 as the Mill Valley Center for the Performing Arts (MVCPA) when 35 Mill Valley residents came together under the leadership of Sali Lieberman. The nonprofit organization brought arts as diverse as film, theater, poetry, dance and concerts of classical, jazz and folk music to Marin County for a decade. After a number of successful community theater productions, MVCPA began to exclusively produce and present theater performances in 1977.

The small group overcame many challenges to put on critically acclaimed, award-winning plays in a golf clubhouse, a veterans’ auditorium and several schools and parks. To acknowledge the organization’s specialization in theater arts and expand regional focus, MVCPA changed its name to Marin Theatre Company (MTC) in 1984. This marked the beginning of a period of extraordinary growth. By 1987, MTC had become a professional theater company, opening its own theater complex with onsite administrative offices and joining with other local theaters to negotiate the first regional equity contract in the Bay Area. MTC began a new play program to support emerging American playwrights, launching a New Works developmental workshop and public reading series in 2004 and establishing two new play prizes in 2007. MTC joined the League of Resident Theatres and the National New Play Network in 2008. The organization discontinued use of the term "Company" in 2024, and is known today as Marin Theatre.

== See also ==
- American Conservatory Theater
- Berkeley Repertory Theatre
- TheatreWorks (Silicon Valley)
- San Jose Repertory Theatre
- Marin Shakespeare Company
