= 2010 Ovation Awards =

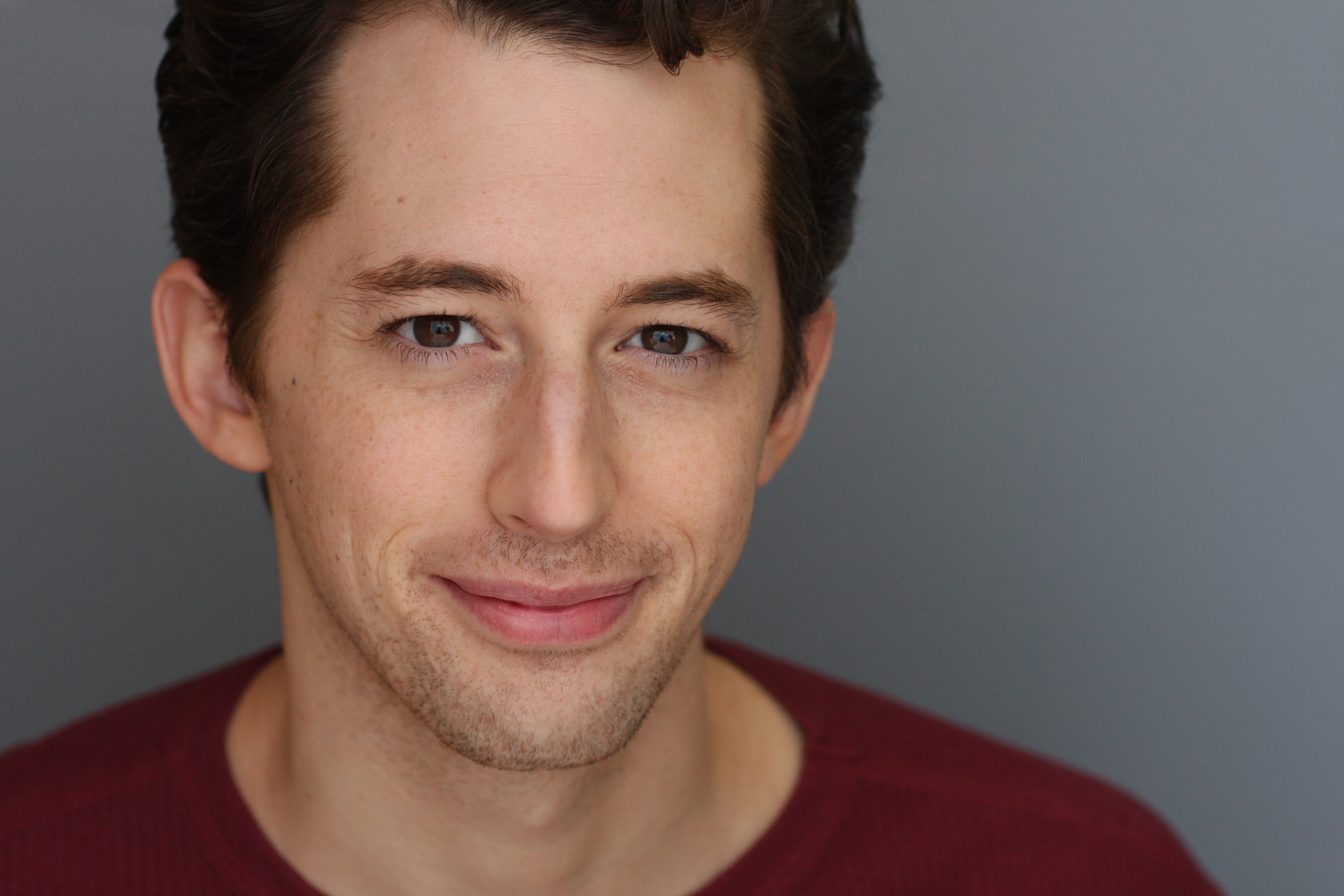
Josh Grisetti, winner, Lead Actor in a Musical

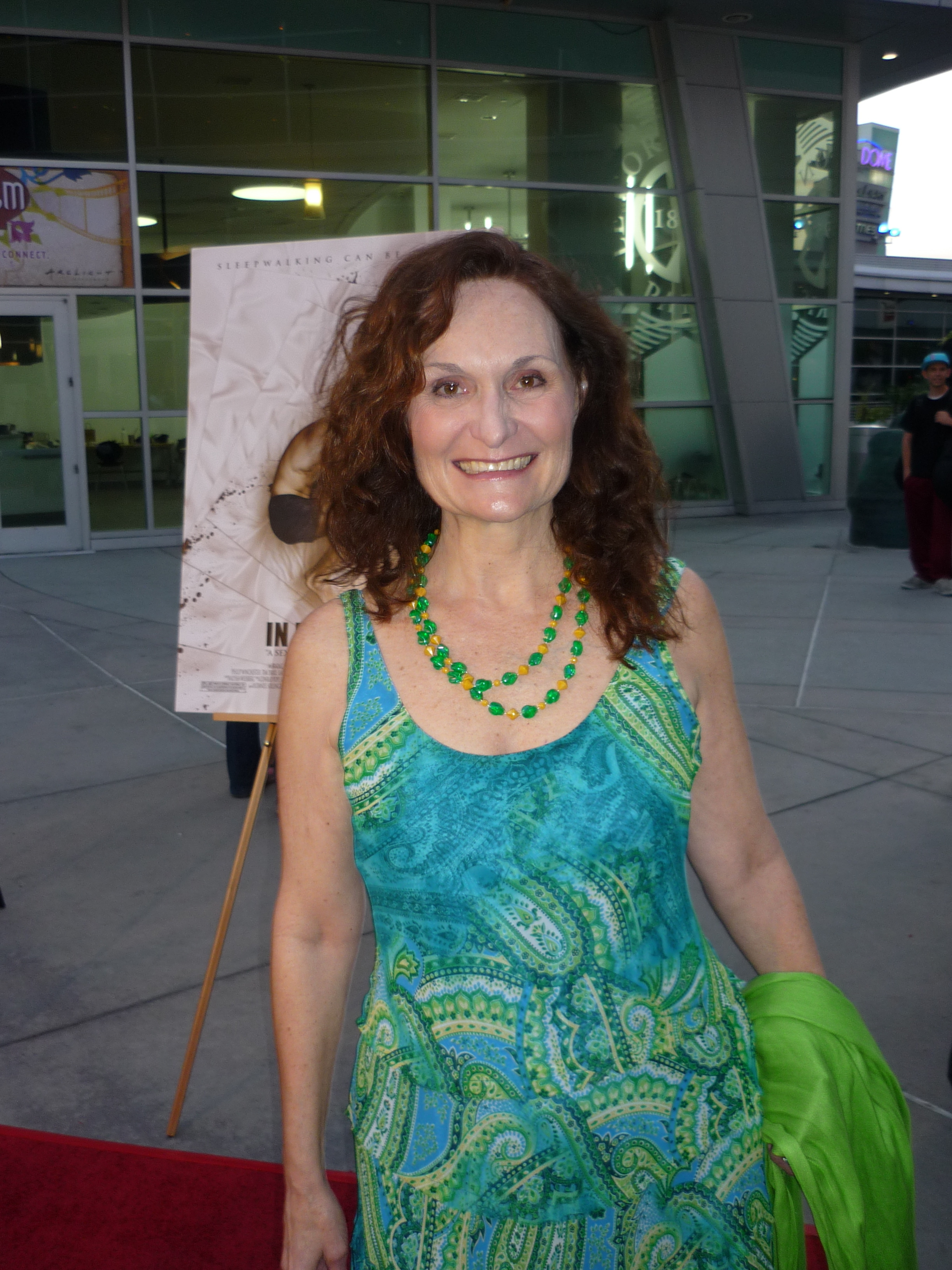
Beth Grant, winner, Lead Actress in a Play

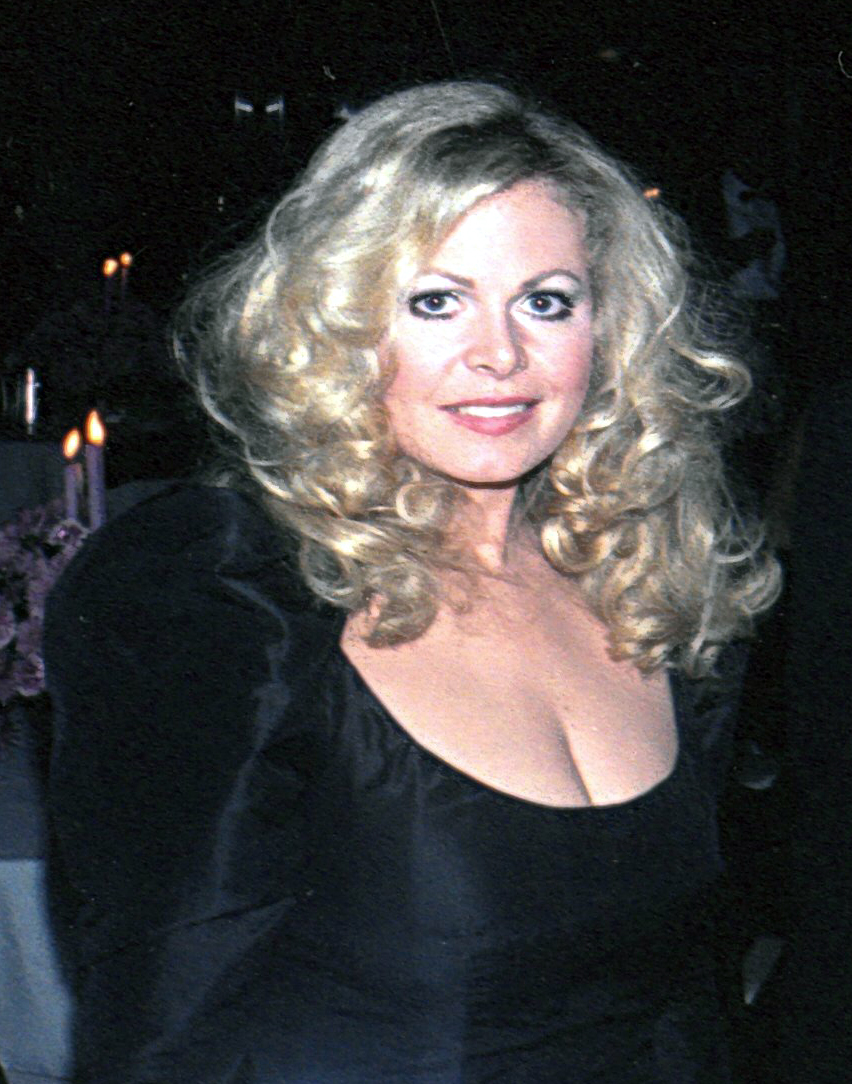
Sally Struthers, winner, Featured Actress in a Musical

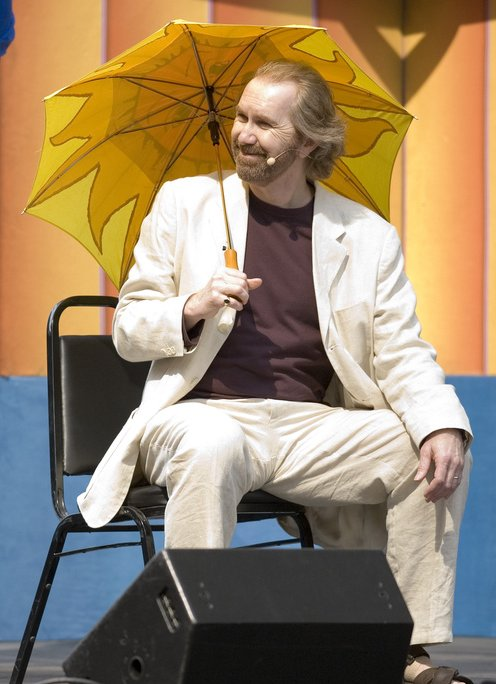
Harry Groener, winner, Featured Actor in a Play

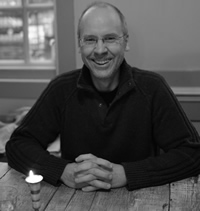
John Caird, winner, Book for an Original Musical, and nominee, Director of a Musical

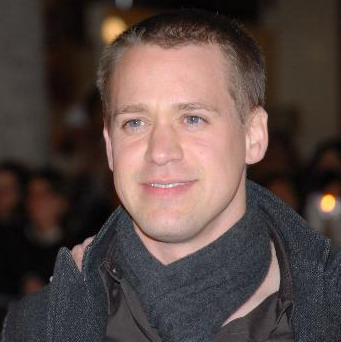
T. R. Knight, nominee, Lead Actor in a Musical

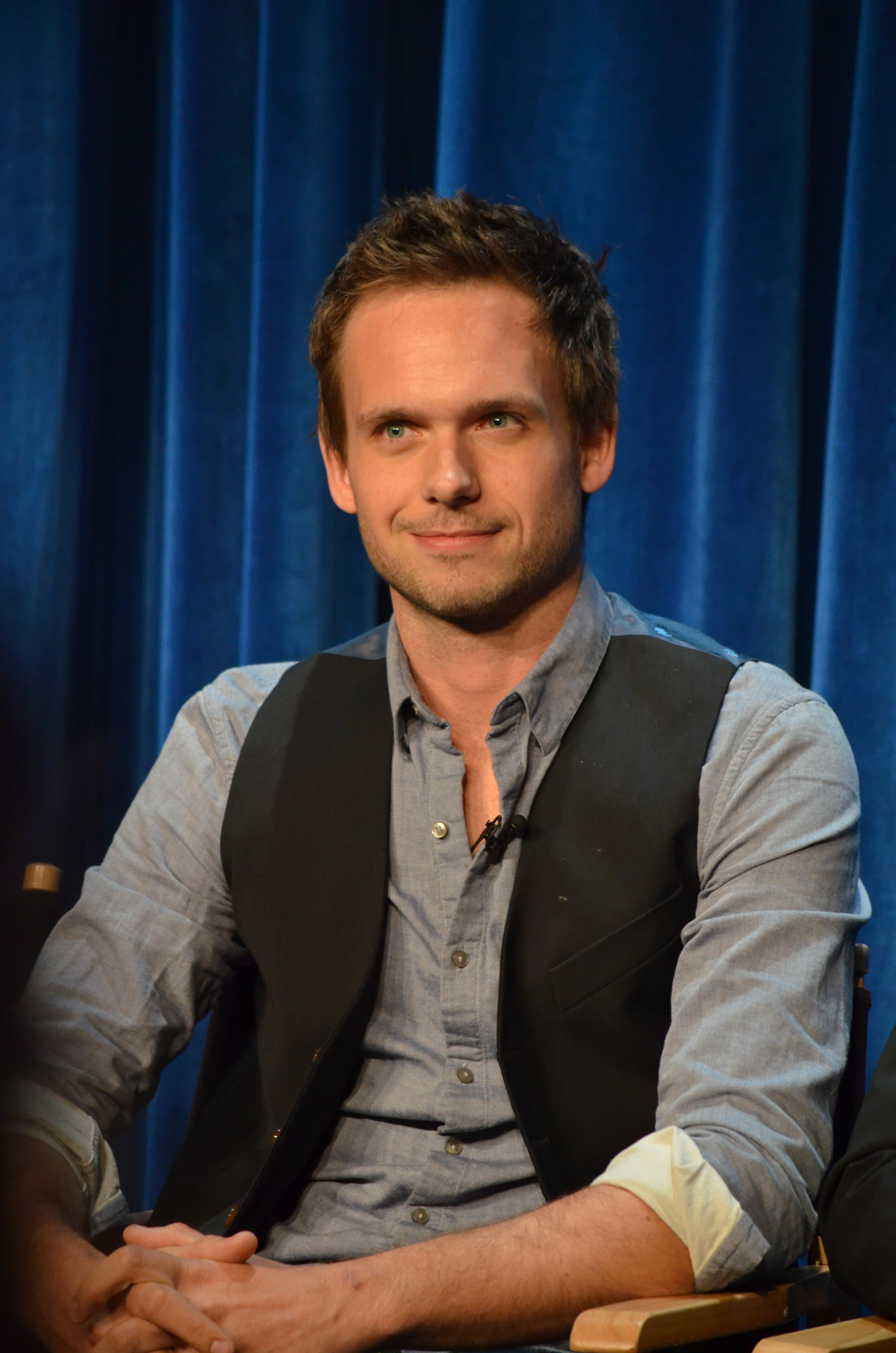
Patrick J. Adams, nominee, Featured Actor in a Play

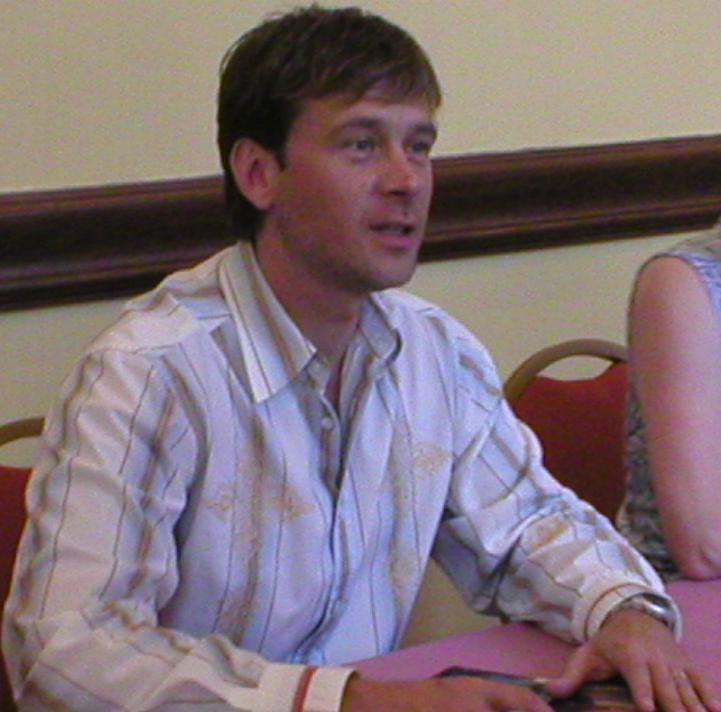
Connor Trinneer, nominee, Featured Actor in a Play

The nominees for the 2010 Ovation Awards were announced on October 18, 2010, at the Autry National Center in Los Angeles, California. The awards were presented for excellence in stage productions in the Los Angeles area from September, 2009 to August, 2010 based upon evaluations from 250 members of the Los Angeles theater community.

The winners were announced on January 17, 2011, in a ceremony at the Thousand Oaks Civic Arts Plaza in Thousand Oaks, California.

== Awards ==
Winners are listed first and highlighted in boldface.

Best Production of a Musical (Intimate Theater)	Best Production of a Musical (Large Theater)
**The Women of Brewster Place – Celebration Theatre**; Project Wonderland – Bootleg Theater; The Story of My Life – Havok Theatre Company; The Who's Tommy – The Chance Theater; Sweeney Todd – The Production Company	**Oedipus the King, Mama! – Troubadour Theater Company**; Carousel – Reprise Theatre Company; Daddy Long Legs – Rubicon Theatre Company; The Marvelous Wonderettes – Musical Theatre West; Parade – Center Theatre Group: Mark Taper Forum
Best Production of a Play (Intimate Theater) – 2 winners	Best Production of a Play (Large Theater)
**The Ballad of Emmett Till – Fountain Theatre**; **Four Places – Rogue Machine Theatre**; Cousin Bette – Antaeus Theatre Company; Oedipus el Rey – The Theatre @ Boston Court; Opus – Fountain Theatre; Shaheed -- The Dream and Death of Benazir Bhutto – Stephanie Feury Studio Theatre; Something Happened – Pacific Stages	**Equivocation – Geffen Playhouse**; Awake and Sing! – A Noise Within; Doubt – Rubicon Theatre Company; Grace & Glorie – The Colony Theatre Company; Through the Night – Geffen Playhouse
Lead Actor in a Musical – 3 winners	Lead Actress in a Musical
**Josh Grisetti as J. Pierrepont Finch – How to Succeed in Business Without Really Trying – Reprise Theatre Company**; **Brendan Hunt as Eldridge – Savin’ Up for Saturday Night – Sacred Fools Theater Company**; **Robert J. Townsend as Thomas Weaver – The Story of My Life – Havok Theatre Company**; T. R. Knight as Leo Frank – Parade – Center Theatre Group: Mark Taper Forum; Chad Borden as Alvin Kelby – The Story of My Life – Havok Theatre Company; Norman Large as Sweeney Todd – Sweeney Todd – Musical Theatre West; Kurt Andrew Hanson as Sweeney Todd – Sweeney Todd – The Production Company	**Megan McGinnis as Jerusha – Daddy Long Legs – Rubicon Theatre Company**; Alexandra Silber as Julie Jordan – Carousel – Reprise Theatre Company; Teri Bibb as Ellen Terry – Children of the Night – Katselas Theatre Company; Lara Pulver as Lucille Frank – Parade – Center Theatre Group: Mark Taper Forum; Debbie Prutsman as Mrs. Lovett – Sweeney Todd – Musical Theatre West
Lead Actor in a Play – 3 winners	Lead Actress in a Play – 2 winners
**Bruce French as Andrew Crocker-Harris – The Browning Version – Pacific Resident Theatre**; **Alan Mandell as Spooner – No Man's Land – Odyssey Theatre Ensemble**; **Daniel Beaty – Through the Night – Geffen Playhouse**; Dakin Matthews as King Lear – King Lear – The Antaeus Company; Justin Huen as Oedipus – Oedipus el Rey – The Theatre @ Boston Court; Will Bradley as Brown – The Twentieth-Century Way – The Theatre @ Boston Court; Robert Mammana as Warren – The Twentieth-Century Way – The Theatre @ Boston Court	**Beth Grant as Grace – Grace & Glorie – The Colony Theatre Company**; **Anna Khaja – Shaheed -- The Dream and Death of Benazir Bhutto – Stephanie Feury Studio Theatre**; Robin Pearson Rose as Sister Aloysius – Doubt – Rubicon Theatre Company; Anne Gee Byrd as Peggy – Four Places – Rogue Machine Theatre; Roxanne Hart as Ellen – Four Places – Rogue Machine Theatre; Agatha Nowicki as Susie – Parasite Drag – Elephant Theatre Company; Eve Sigall as A – Three Tall Women – West Coast Ensemble
Featured Actor in a Musical	Featured Actress in a Musical
**David St. Louis as Newt Lee/Jim Conley/Riley – Parade – Center Theatre Group: Mark Taper Forum**; Andy Taylor as Enoch Snow – Carousel – Reprise Theatre Company; Sam Zeller as Jud Fry – Oklahoma! – Civic Light Opera of South Bay Cities; Michael Berresse as Governor Slaton/Britt Craig/Mr. Peavy – Parade – Center Theatre Group: Mark Taper Forum; Dan Callaway as Anthony Hope – Sweeney Todd – Musical Theatre West; Rob Herring as Tobias – Sweeney Todd – The Production Company; R. Christofer Sands as Pirelli/Fogg – Sweeney Todd – The Production Company	**Sally Struthers as Fairy Godmother – Cinderella – Cabrillo Music Theatre**; Jane Noseworthy as Carrie Pipperidge – Carousel – Reprise Theatre Company; Vicki Lewis as Smitty – How to Succeed in Business Without Really Trying – Reprise Theatre Company; Deidrie Henry as Minnie McKnight – Parade – Center Theatre Group: Mark Taper Forum; Sarah Bermudez as Johanna – Sweeney Todd – Musical Theatre West; Michelle Duffy as Beggar Woman – Sweeney Todd – Musical Theatre West; Jenny Ashman as Johanna – Sweeney Todd – The Production Company
Featured Actor in a Play	Featured Actress in a Play
**Harry Groener as Richard – Equivocation – Geffen Playhouse**; John Prosky as Hector Hulot – Cousin Bette – The Antaeus Company; Patrick J. Adams as Sharpe – Equivocation – Geffen Playhouse; Brian Henderson as Armin – Equivocation – Geffen Playhouse; Connor Trinneer as Nate – Equivocation – Geffen Playhouse; Morlan Higgins as Sam – Forgiveness – Black Dahlia Theatre; Matthew Scott Montgomery as Kendall Parker – Yellow – Jd3atrical	**Deirdre O’Connell as Judy – The Wake – Center Theatre Group: Kirk Douglas Theatre**; Jan Sheldrick as Etta Poore – Anita Bryant Died for Your Sins – West Coast Ensemble; Amanda Detmer as Missy – Extinction – Red Dog Squadron; Lee Garlington as Penny – Forgiveness – Black Dahlia Theatre; Lisa Rothschiller as Barb – Four Places – Rogue Machine Theatre; Danielle Skraastad as Laurie – The Wake – Center Theatre Group: Kirk Douglas Theatre; Susan Leslie as Timothea Parker – Yellow – Jd3atrical
Acting Ensemble	Best Season
**The cast of The Ballad of Emmett Till – Fountain Theatre**; The cast of The 25th Annual Putnam County Spelling Bee – La Mirada Theatre for The Performing Arts; The cast of The Marvelous Wonderettes – Musical Theatre West; The cast of Oedipus el Rey – The Theatre @ Boston Court; The cast of Opus – Fountain Theatre; The cast of Something Happened – Pacific Stages; The cast of The Women of Brewster Place – Celebration Theatre	**Fountain Theatre**; Cabrillo Music Theatre; Reprise Theatre Company; The Los Angeles Theatre Center (LATC); The Production Company; The Theatre @ Boston Court; Troubadour Theater Company
Director of a Musical	Director of a Play
**Matt Walker – Oedipus the King, Mama! – Troubadour Theater Company**; Nick Degruccio – The Andrews Brothers – Cabrillo Music Theatre; Michael Michetti – Carousel – Reprise Theatre Company; John Caird – Daddy Long Legs – Rubicon Theatre Company; Robert Ashford – Parade – Center Theatre Group: Mark Taper Forum; Oanh Nguyen – The Who's Tommy – The Chance Theater; Michael Matthews – The Women of Brewster Place – Celebration Theatre	**Shirley Jo Finney – The Ballad of Emmett Till – Fountain Theatre**; David Esbjornson – Equivocation – Geffen Playhouse; Robin Larsen – Four Places – Rogue Machine Theatre; Jon Lawrence Rivera – Oedipus el Rey – The Theatre @ Boston Court; L Trey Wilson – Something Happened – Pacific Stages; Charles Randolph-Wright – Through the Night – Geffen Playhouse; Michael Michetti – The Twentieth-Century Way – The Theatre @ Boston Court
Music Direction	Choreography
**John Glaudini – Sweeney Todd – Musical Theatre West**; Lloyd Cooper – The Andrews Brothers – Cabrillo Music Theatre; Michael Borth – The Marvelous Wonderettes – Musical Theatre West; Tom Murray – Parade – Center Theatre Group: Mark Taper Forum; David O – Songs and Dances of Imaginary Lands – Overtone Industries; Michael Paternostro – The Story of My Life – Havok Theatre Company; Richard Berent – Sweeney Todd – The Production Company	**Lee Martino – Carousel – Reprise Theatre Company**; Roger Castellano – The Andrews Brothers – Cabrillo Music Theatre; Ameenah Kaplan – The Ballad of Emmett Till – Fountain Theatre; Janet Miller – The Marvelous Wonderettes – Musical Theatre West; Lili Fuller, Joe Sofranko, Matthew Krumpe & Juliana Tyson – Neverwonderland 2010 – Ensemble Theatre Company; Robert Ashfordo – Parade – Center Theatre Group: Mark Taper Forum; Ameenah Kaplan – The Women of Brewster Place – Celebration Theatre
Book for an Original Musical	Lyrics/Music for an Original Musical
**John Caird – Daddy Long Legs – Rubicon Theatre Company**; Scott Martin – Children of the Night – Katselas Theatre Company; Rick Batalla – CHiPs The Musical – Troubadour Theater Company; Dakin Matthews – Liberty Inn: The Musical – Andak Stage Company; Robert Prior – Project Wonderland – Bootleg Theater	**Paul Gordon – Daddy Long Legs – Rubicon Theatre Company**; Henry Phillips – CHiPs The Musical – Troubadour Theater Company; B.T. Ryback & Dakin Matthews – Liberty Inn: The Musical – Andak Stage Company; Indira Stefanianna – Project Wonderland – Bootleg Theater; Richard Levinson, Larry Herbstritt & Tom Campbell – Savin’ Up for Saturday Night – Sacred Fools Theater Company
Playwrighting For An Original Play	
**L. Trey Wilson – Something Happened – Pacific Stages**; Donald Freed – 1951-2006 – The Los Angeles Theatre Center (LATC); Jeffrey Hatcher – Cousin Bette – The Antaeus Company; David Schulner – Forgiveness – Black Dahlia Theatre; Luis Alfaro – Oedipus el Rey – The Theatre @ Boston Court; Tom Jacobson – The Twentieth-Century Way – The Theatre @ Boston Court; Del Shores – Yellow – Jd3atrical	
Lighting Design (Intimate Theater)	Lighting Design (Large Theater)
**Jeremy Pivnick – Oedipus el Rey – The Theatre @ Boston Court**; Leigh Allen – Cousin Bette – The Antaeus Company; Steven Young – God Save Gertrude – The Theatre @ Boston Court; Brian Sidney Bembridge – The Good Book of Pedantry and Wonder – The Theatre @ Boston Court; Elizabeth Harper – The Twentieth-Century Way – The Theatre @ Boston Court; KC Wilkerson – Welcome Home, Jenny Sutter – The Chance Theater; KC Wilkerson – The Who's Tommy – The Chance Theater	**Scott Zielinski – Equivocation – Geffen Playhouse**; Christopher Ash – 1951-2006 – The Los Angeles Theatre Center (LATC); Steven Young – Carousel – Reprise Theatre Company; Mason Barker – Neverwonderland 2010 – Ensemble Theatre Company; Neil Austin – Parade – Center Theatre Group: Mark Taper Forum; Jeff Croiter – The Pee-Wee Herman Show – AEG Live; Alexander Nichols – Through the Night – Geffen Playhouse
Scenic Design (Intimate Theater)	Scenic Design (Large Theater)
**Brian Sidney Bembridge – The Good Book of Pedantry and Wonder – The Theatre @ Boston Court**; Desma Murphy – As White as O – Road Theatre Company; Jeff G. Rack – Black Coffee – Theatre 40; Tom Buderwitz – Cousin Bette – The Antaeus Company; Susan Gratch – God Save Gertrude – The Theatre @ Boston Court; Katie Polebaum – Gogol Project – Bootleg Theater; John Binkley – Oedipus el Rey – The Theatre @ Boston Court	**Jeff McLaughlin – Grace & Glorie – The Colony Theatre Company**; John Iacovelli – Cave Quest – East West Players; Stephen Gifford – Celadine – The Colony Theatre Company; David Farley – Daddy Long Legs – Rubicon Theatre Company; David Korins – The Pee-Wee Herman Show – AEG Live; Snezana Petrovic – Songs and Dances of Imaginary Lands – Overtone Industries; David Korins – The Wake – Center Theatre Group: Kirk Douglas Theatre
Sound Design (Intimate Theater)	Sound Design (Large Theater)
**Peter Bayne – Opus – Fountain Theatre**; John Zalewski – Absinthe, Opium & Magic: 1920s Shanghai – Grand Guignolers; David B. Marling – The Ballad of Emmett Till – Fountain Theatre; Jason Duplissea – Blood and Thunder – Moving Arts; Cricket S. Myers – Cousin Bette – The Antaeus Company; Mark Wilson – Neighborhood 3 : Requisition of Doom – Sacred Fools Theater Company; Rob Oriol – Oedipus el Rey – The Theatre @ Boston Court	**Lindsay Jones – Through the Night – Geffen Playhouse**; Jonathan Burke – Daddy Long Legs – Rubicon Theatre Company; Jon Gottlieb – Equivocation – Geffen Playhouse; Cricket S. Myers – Grace & Glorie – The Colony Theatre Company; Cricket S. Myers – The Lieutenant of Inishmore – Center Theatre Group: Mark Taper Forum; Jon Weston – Parade – Center Theatre Group: Mark Taper Forum; John Zalewski – Solitude – The Los Angeles Theatre Center (LATC)
Costume Design (Intimate Theater)	Costume Design (Large Theater) – 2 winners
**Teresa Shea – Project Wonderland – Bootleg Theater**; Vicki Conrad – Big River: The Adventures of Huckleberry Finn – Actors Co-Op/Crossley Theatre; Joyce Ferrer – Black Coffee – Theatre 40; A. Jeffrey Schoenberg – Children of the Night – Katselas Theatre Company; A. Jeffrey Schoenberg – Cousin Bette – The Antaeus Company; Kerry Hennessy – Gogol Project – Bootleg Theater; Erika C. Miller – The Who's Tommy – The Chance Theater	**Christopher Oram – Parade – Center Theatre Group: Mark Taper Forum**; **Snezana Petrovic – Songs and Dances of Imaginary Lands – Overtone Industries**; Julie Keen – Awake and Sing! – A Noise Within; A. Jeffrey Schoenberg – Celadine – The Colony Theatre Company; Sharon Mcgunigle – Frosty The Snow Manilow – Troubadour Theater Company; Shigeru Yaji – Peace – The J. Paul Getty Trust; Ann Closs-Farley – The Pee-Wee Herman Show – AEG Live

== Ovation Honors ==
Ovation Honors, which recognize outstanding achievement in areas that are not among the standard list of nomination categories, were presented when the nominations were announced.

- Music Composition for a Play – Ego Plum – Gogol Project – Bootleg Theater
- Fight Choreography – Edgar Landa – Oedipus el Rey – The Theatre @ Boston Court
- Puppet Design – Lynn Jeffries – Project Wonderland – Bootleg Theater
- Video Design – K.C. Wilkerson – The Who's Tommy – The Chance Theater
