= 9 Circles =

Play by Bill Cain

- Original language: English
- Written by: Bill Cain
- Characters: Daniel; The Military; The Legal Team; The Shrink; The Pastor
- Genre: Drama

Premiere
- Date: October 19, 2010
- Place: Marin Theatre Company

9 Circles is a play by Bill Cain based on the military career and subsequent civilian trial of murderer Steven Dale Green. The play premiered in 2010 at Marin Theatre Company in Mill Valley, California before premiering Off-Broadway in 2018.

== Plot ==
The play follows a man named Daniel Reeves, an honorably discharged soldier who is arrested for crimes he may have committed while serving. Grappling with an antisocial disorder, he is put on trial for the rape and murder of an Iraqi family and falls into a labyrinth of bureaucracy. The story is based on the real-life life and trial of Steven Dale Green.

== Background ==
Cain is a Jesuit priest. The play's title refers to Dante Alighieri's Inferno—in which Dante navigates a descent into the "nine circles of hell". In Cain's play, Green passes through his discharge from the Army and various judicial and administrative procedures, roughly paralleling the nine circles of Dante's Inferno. Cain structured the play so other cast members would return to play multiple characters, at each different circle.

== Production history ==
=== 2010 California premiere ===
The play had its world premiere at the Marin Theatre Company in Mill Valley, California, directed by Kent Nicholson and starring Craig Marker as Daniel. The production ran from October 14 to November 7, 2010. The play was positively reviewed, and Cain won the 2010 Sky Cooper New American Play Prize and 2011 Harold and Mimi Steinberg/ATCA New Play Award.

=== 2018 Off-Broadway production ===
The play was next produced Off-Broadway at The Sheen Center for Thought & Culture, running from February 9 to March 20, 2017. The production was directed by Kent Nicholson and starred Josh Collins.

=== 2022 West End production ===
The play had its UK premiere in 2022 at the Park Theatre, running from June 29 to July 23, 2022. The production was directed by Laurence Olivier Award-winning director, Guy Masterson, with Collins reprising his role as Daniel.

== Reception ==
The play won praise for being nuanced, and not taking the easy path of demonizing the protagonist. However, Chris Jones, reviewing a Chicago production of the play, reported that audience members concluded the play meant to imply that Green, who was originally from Midland, Texas, which had been United States President George W. Bush's primary home, had the assistance of the President himself in clearing his entry into the Army in spite of his criminal record.

== Awards and nominations ==
The script won the 2011 Harold and Mimi Steinberg/ATCA New Play Award. Cain is the only playwright to have two plays win this award two years in a row.
