= Stephen Sachs =

American stage director and playwright (born 1959)

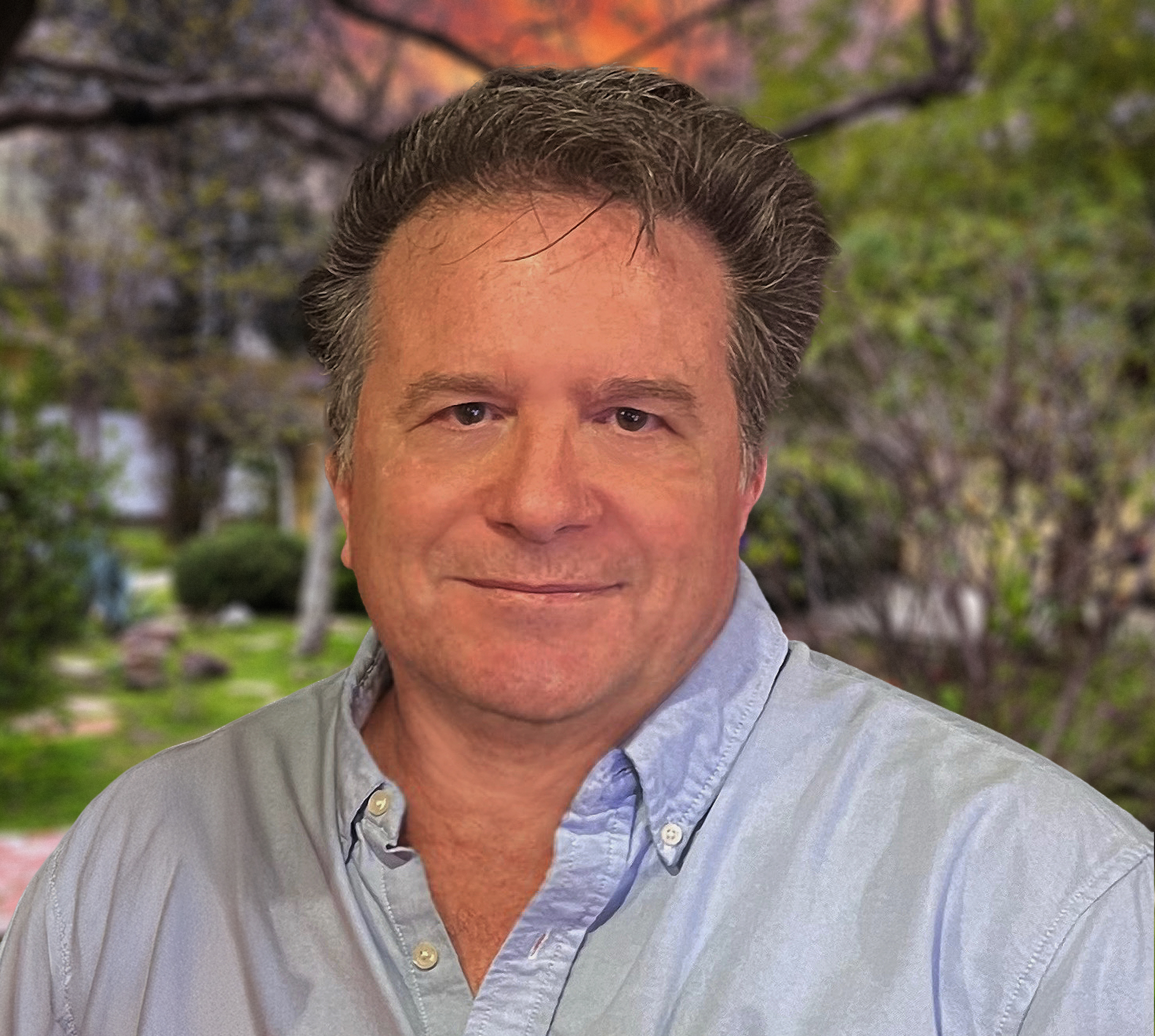
- Sachs in 2025
- Born: August 14, 1959 (age 67); San Francisco, US
- Education: Los Angeles City College
- Occupations: Stage director; playwright
- Spouse: Jacqueline Schultz
- Children: 2

Stephen Sachs (born August 14, 1959) is an American stage director, playwright, producer, and screenwriter. He co-founded the Fountain Theatre in Los Angeles in 1990 and served as its artistic director until 2024. He is known for his work in American regional theater, including collaborations with Athol Fugard and Deaf West Theatre, and for productions staged in Los Angeles, New York, and London. He has received multiple theater awards, including the Milton Katselas Award from the Los Angeles Drama Critics Circle for lifetime achievement in directing.

== Biography ==
=== Early life ===
Sachs was born in San Francisco and grew up in Westlake Village, California. He attended Agoura High School and later studied at the Theatre Academy at Los Angeles City College. Early in his career, he worked as an actor in film, television, and theater, before transitioning to directing and writing.

=== Career ===
Sachs is the author of 18 full-length plays. His directing debut came in 1987, with a stage adaptation of Italo Calvino's The Baron in the Trees at Ensemble Studio Theatre in Los Angeles. In 1990, he joined the staff of the Canon Theatre in Beverly Hills, where he worked on the Los Angeles premiere of A. R. Gurney's Love Letters. Featuring a rotating two-person celebrity cast, the production ran for 565 performances. That same year, Sachs co-founded the Fountain Theatre in Hollywood. His early work there included the world premiere of his stage adaptation of Vikram Seth's verse novel The Golden Gate, which transferred to the Zephyr Theatre in San Francisco in 1991.

In 2001, the Fountain Theatre presented the world premiere of Central Avenue, a drama written by Sachs and set in Los Angeles' Black jazz scene of the 1940s. The production ran for seven months and was a finalist for the PEN West Literary Award for Drama.

In 2002, playwright Arthur Miller granted Sachs exclusive permission to direct After the Fall at the Fountain Theatre. In 2006, Sachs directed Hippolytos, featuring a new translation by poet Anne Carson, to inaugurate the Outdoor Classical Theater at the Getty Villa in Pacific Palisades.

Sachs was involved in the early development of Deaf West Theatre, which began operating at the Fountain Theatre in 1991. He directed early Deaf West productions, including One Flew Over the Cuckoo's Nest (1992) and 'night, Mother (1994). His work with deaf theater continued with Sweet Nothing in My Ear, a family drama addressing the experiences of a deaf and hearing couple raising a deaf child. It premiered at the Fountain Theatre in 1997 and was directed by Sachs. The production later received the California Governor's Media Access Award for Outstanding Achievement in Theatre. Subsequent productions were staged at Victory Gardens Theater in Chicago (1998) and Mixed Blood Theatre in Minneapolis (2003), both directed by Sachs. Sachs later wrote the teleplay adaptation, which premiered on CBS as a Hallmark Hall of Fame presentation in 2008, directed by Joseph Sargent and starring Marlee Matlin and Jeff Daniels.

Sachs developed a long-standing artistic relationship with South African playwright Athol Fugard, beginning in 2000 with the Los Angeles premiere of The Road to Mecca at the Fountain Theatre. Over the following decade, he directed multiple Los Angeles premieres of Fugard's plays and the world premiere of Exits and Entrances in 2004. He later directed the 2007 Off-Broadway production at 59E59 Theaters, produced by Primary Stages.

Sachs's play Open Window premiered in 2005 at the Pasadena Playhouse in a co-production with Deaf West Theatre. Directed by Eric Simonson, the production starred Linda Bove and Shoshannah Stern. The play earned Sachs a second California Governor's Media Access Award for Theatre Excellence.

In 2011, Sachs directed Top Secret, a dramatization of The Washington Post's publication of the Pentagon Papers, for L.A. Theatre Works. The production toured China. Sachs's play Bakersfield Mist premiered at the Fountain Theatre in 2011 and ran for seven months. In 2014, it was produced in London's West End at the Duchess Theatre, starring Kathleen Turner and Ian McDiarmid.

In 2012, Sachs wrote Cyrano, a deaf-themed reinterpretation of Edmond Rostand's play, which premiered at the Fountain Theatre and starred Troy Kotsur. It received the Los Angeles Drama Critics Circle Award for Best New Play. Sachs later collaborated again with Kotsur on Arrival & Departure, a reimagining of the 1945 British film Brief Encounter, which premiered at the Fountain Theatre in 2018.

Citizen: An American Lyric, adapted for the stage by Sachs from Claudia Rankine's book, had its world premiere at the Fountain Theatre in 2015. A remount followed in 2017 at the Kirk Douglas Theatre in Culver City, produced by Center Theatre Group.

In 2018 and 2019, Sachs directed live staged readings of All the President's Men and Ms. Smith Goes to Washington at Los Angeles City Hall, produced in partnership with the Los Angeles City Council and featuring actors from the television series The West Wing and Scandal. Ms. Smith Goes to Washington is an authorized stage adaptation of the film Mr. Smith Goes to Washington, reimagining the titular role as a female U.S. Senator.

During the COVID-19 pandemic in 2020, Sachs oversaw the installation of an outdoor performance space in the Fountain Theatre parking lot, which became the first live outdoor theater venue approved for public performances by the City of Los Angeles during the shutdown.

In 2024, Sachs wrote and directed Fatherland, a docudrama based on court transcripts concerning the January 6, 2021, attack on the United States Capitol. The production premiered at the Fountain Theatre and later transferred to New York City Center.

In 2024, the Fountain Theatre announced that Sachs would retire as artistic director at the end of the year.

=== Personal life ===
Sachs is married to actress Jacqueline Schultz. They have two children.

== Productions ==
=== as director ===
- The Road to Mecca (2000) Los Angeles premiere
- After the Fall (2002) Los Angeles
- Exits and Entrances (2004) world premiere, Los Angeles
- Hippolytos (2006) Getty Villa, Malibu, world premiere translation
- String of Pearls (2006) Los Angeles premiere
- Exits and Entrances (2007) off-Broadway, NYC
- Miss Julie: Freedom Summer (2007) world premiere, Los Angeles
- Gilgamesh (2007) world premiere adaptation
- Victory (2008) United States premiere
- Shining City (2009) Los Angeles premiere
- Coming Home (2009) West Coast premiere
- Side Man (2010) starring Christine Lahti, LA Theatre Works

=== as playwright ===
- The Baron in the Trees (1987), adaptation
- The Golden Gate (1991)
- Sweet Nothing in My Ear (1997)
- Mother's Day (1999)
- Central Avenue (2001)
- Open Window (2005), Pasadena Playhouse
- Gilgamesh (2007), adaptation
- Miss Julie: Freedom Summer (2007), new version of August Strindberg's Miss Julie
- Bakersfield Mist (2012)

== Awards and honors ==
Sachs has received multiple Los Angeles theater awards as a playwright, director, and producer. In 2024, he received the Milton Katselas Award from the Los Angeles Drama Critics Circle for lifetime achievement in directing. The Los Angeles City Council issued a 2024 proclamation recognizing his contributions to theater in the city.

=== as director ===
- Best Director – Golden Gate – Drama-Logue Award (1990)
- Best Director – Fanon's People – Drama-Logue Award (1991)
- Best Director – Cuckoo's Nest – Drama-Logue Award (1992)
- Best Director – The Seagull – Drama-Logue Award (1993)
- Best Director – Night Mother – Drama-Logue Award (1994)
- Best Director – Ashes – Drama-Logue Award (1994)
- Best Director – Lonely Planet – Robby Award nomination (1996)
- Best Director – The Road to Mecca – Maddy Award (2000)
- Best Director – The Road to Mecca – Robby Award nomination (2000)
- Best Director – After the Fall – Maddy Award (2002)
- Best Director – After the Fall – Ovation Award (2002)
- Best Director – Sweet Nothing in my Ear – Minneapolis (2003)
- Best Director – Exits and Entrances – Ovation Award, Los Angeles (2004)
- Best Director – Exits and Entrances – Los Angeles Drama Critics Circle Award (2004)
- Best Director – Exits and Entrances – L.A. Weekly Award nomination (2004)
- Best Director – Exits and Entrances – Maddy Award, Los Angeles (2004)
- Best Director – Exits and Entrances – Carbonell Award nomination (2005)
- Best Director – Victory – NAACP Theatre Award (2008)
- 2009 Zelda Fichandler Award nomination (2009)
- Best Director – Coming Home – LA Weekly Award (2009)

=== as playwright ===
- Best Playwright – Golden Gate – Drama-Logue Award (1990)
- Citation of Appreciation, Los Angeles City Council, for "enhancing the cultural life of the City of Los Angeles" (1996)
- California Governor's Media Access Award for Theatre – Sweet Nothing in my Ear (1997)
- Finalist – Sweet Nothing in my Ear – PEN West Literary Award for Drama (1998)
- Best Play – Mother's Day – Garland Award Honorable Mention (1999)
- Finalist – Central Avenue – PEN West Literary Award for Drama (2001)
- Best Play – Central Avenue – Back Stage Garland Award (2001)
- Best Play – Central Avenue – Beverly Press Maddy Award (2001)
- Best Adaptation – Miss Julie – Los Angeles Drama Critics Circle nomination (2007)
- Best Adaptation – Miss Julie – L.A. Weekly Theatre Award nomination (2007)
