= Nora Armani =

Egyptian play director

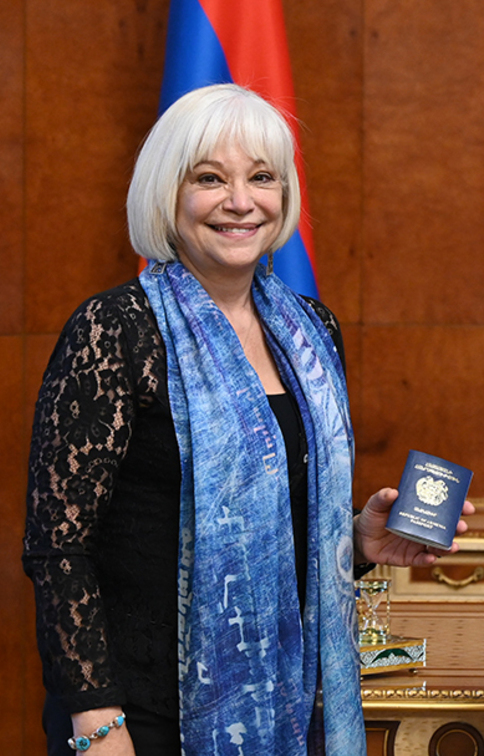
- Born: 31 August 1956 (age 69); Giza
- Citizenship: Egypt, France
- Occupations: Actor, Screenwriter, Film director

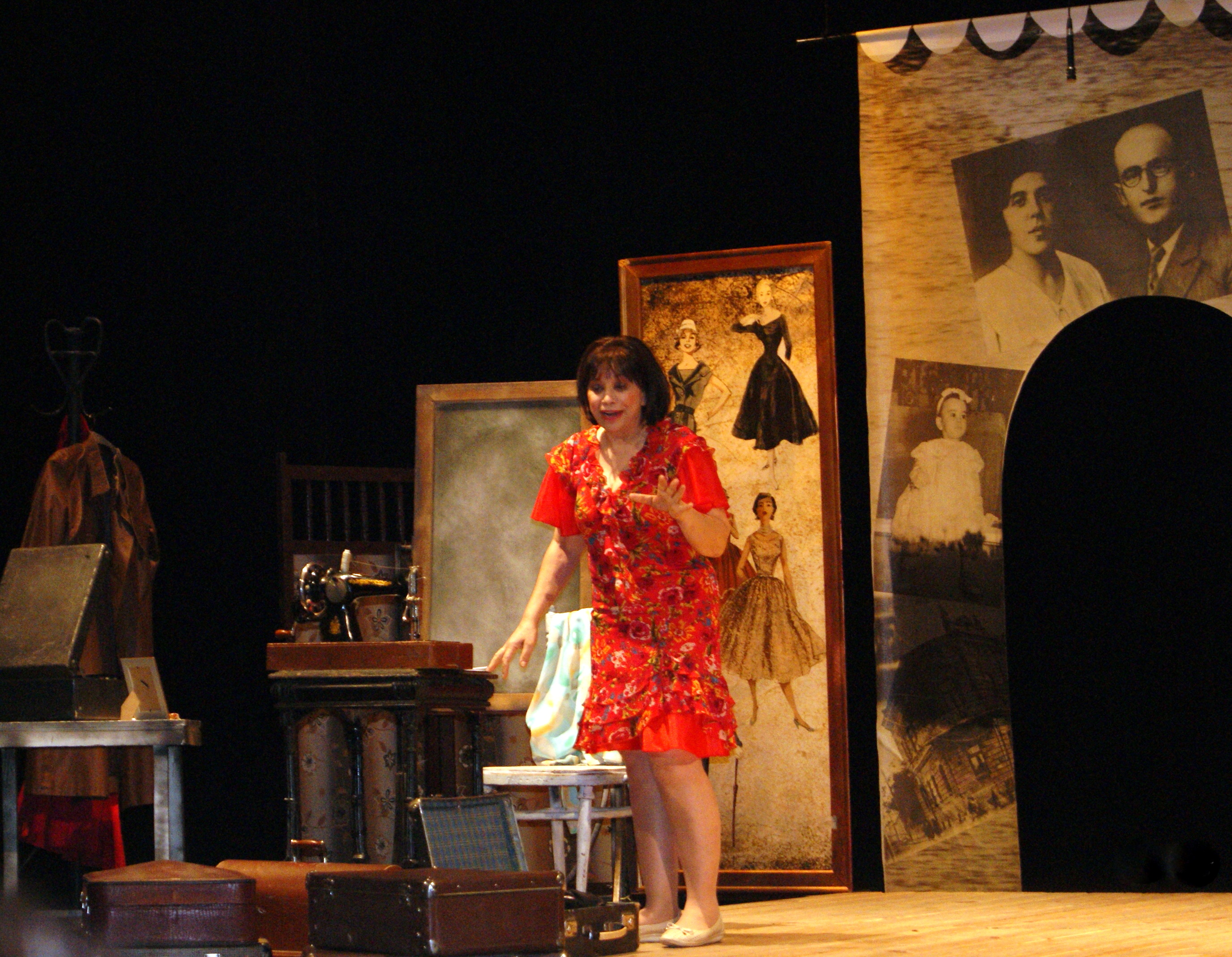
Nora Armani during the play "Mercedes"

Nora Armani (Arabic: نورا أرماني) (Armenian: Նորա Արմանի) is an actor and film-maker. She was born in Giza, Egypt of Armenian parents, educated and trained in England and as an actor has appeared on stage and screen worldwide performing in different languages. She has also directed a number of plays, a feature film and short film. She holds a master's degree in theatre from Hunter College CUNY and an M.Sc. degree from the University of London (London School of Economics) and a BA from the American University in Cairo. She has continued her training at UCLA Extension and RADA in acting and directing, in addition to a number of noteworthy workshops such as Ariane Mnouchkine's worldwide acclaimed Théâtre du Soleil (Paris) and Simon MacBurney's equally well known physical theatre Théâtre de Complicité (London).

Her stage work includes: The Lover (Harold Pinter - Los Angeles) with Aramazd Stepanian, Evocations of Armenia (Metropolitan Museum of Art, New York), Beyond the Veil (Off-Broadway), The Plebeians Rehearse the Uprising (Arcola Theatre - London), The King and I (Cairo), Arms and the Man (Young Vic Theatre - London), On the Couch with Nora Armani (London, Paris, NYC, Los Angeles & on tour), The Virile Celebration (F. Gallaire – Paris), No Possible Return (H. Ghazanchyan – National Theatre of Armenia) to name a few.

Films & TV include: Chasing Taste (Film), Innocent (Film), Salam Shalom (Film - lead), Golden Boy (CBS TV series), Santa Claus in Baghdad, Enchanted, The Doors of Denis, Le Néflier, La Nouvelle Eve, Deadline in Seven Days, Last Station (as co-director), Labyrinth, Casualty (BBC-TV) and Friends (Egyptian-TV).

Her own stage creations Sojourn at Ararat (with Gerald Papasian), Nannto Nannto, On the Couch with Nora Armani and Snowflakes in April have garnered international accolades.

Directorial work includes: William Saroyan's Papa You're Crazy–Yerevan, Armenia (adapted and directed), Sojourn at Ararat (The Fountain Theatre - Los Angeles), J.J. Varoujean's Forest at the Bottom of the Sea (Paris & Los Angeles), Thornton Wilder's Bernice (Off-Broadway- Producers Club), Snowflakes in April (Chicago, Detroit), Nannto, Nanto (Paris & Venice), Last Station (feature film), Evocations of Armenia (MET Museum New York).

Awards: Two Drama-Logue awards for Performance and Creation for Sojourn at Ararat, Best Performance & Creation (Armenia), Best Actress in film for Labyrinth (Armenia).

Armani is an Honorary Member of the National Theatre of Armenia.

Her poems and essays are published in anthologies and literary journals. Her plays have been broadcast on radio Aligre FM in Paris.

Following Los Angeles (1981–1993) and Paris/London (since 1993), as of 2009 Armani divided her time between New York and Paris.

Armani is the founding artistic director of the Socially Relevant Film Festival, and is festival curator for the 7th festival in 2020.
