= Having It All (musical) =

Musical

Promotional artwork

Having It All is a 2011 American musical with music by John Kavanaugh, book by David Goldsmith and Wendy Perelman, and lyrics by David Goldsmith based on an idea by Wendy Perelman. The plot concerns five women waiting in an airport lounge for a continually delayed plane. The musical was nominated in the Musical category in the 2011 Ovation Awards. The musical had a second run at the Laguna Playhouse, Laguna Beach 2013.
