= Equivocation (disambiguation) =

Equivocation is a logical fallacy whereby an argument is made with a term which changes semantics in the course of the argument.

Equivocation may also refer to:

- Equivocation (information theory), measures the amount of information that is contained in a random variable or other unknown quantity, given the knowledge over another random variable
- Amphibology, equivocation in literature
- Equivocation (magic), a technique in magic or mentalism, in which a performer gives the appearance of an apparent choice, with no such choice existing.
- Equivocation (play), a play by Bill Cain
- Doctrine of mental reservation
