= Jennifer Damiano =

American actress, singer (born 1991)

- Born: May 12, 1991 (age 35); White Plains, New York, U.S.
- Occupations: Actress; singer
- Years active: 2006–present
- Spouse: Michael Zegen (m. 2025)
- Children: 1

Jennifer Damiano (born May 12, 1991) is an American actress and singer. She made her Broadway debut in 2006 as an ensemble member in the original production of Spring Awakening, and went on to originate the role of Natalie Goodman in the musical Next to Normal, for which she was nominated for the 2009 Tony Award for Best Actress in a Featured Role in a Musical, becoming one of the youngest nominees for the award at age 17. Her other Broadway roles include Mary Jane Watson in Spider-Man: Turn Off the Dark in 2011 and Jean in the 2016 musical American Psycho, in addition to a number of roles off-Broadway.

== Early life ==
Damiano was born in White Plains, New York to Mark and Nancy Damiano. Her father, Mark, owns an amusement company, and her mother Nancy works at Westchester Community College. When she was nine years old, she began taking voice lessons and joined a children's theatre, The Random Farms Kids' Theater, playing parts such as Dorothy Gale in The Wizard of Oz, the title role in Cinderella, Gertrude McFuzz in Seussical and Marion Paroo in The Music Man. As Damiano began her acting career, she stayed enrolled in her hometown's public high school, where she graduated in 2009.

== Career ==
=== Early career ===
At the age of nine, Damiano made her professional debut in New York City playing Samantha and Josefina in a show based on the American Girl dolls. While continuing to participate in suburban community theater in shows such as Oliver!, Damiano continued to perform professionally, in small professional roles in New York City. Off-Broadway, she appeared in Inner Voices: Solo Voices at the now-defunct Zipper Factory.

=== 2006–2011: Broadway debut and leading roles ===
On December 10, 2006, at the age of 15, she joined the original cast of the musical Spring Awakening on Broadway as an ensemble member and understudy for the roles of Anna, Martha, Ilse and Thea. She was the youngest performer in the cast. Damiano was originally hired also to understudy Lea Michele in the leading role of Wendla, but she was not legally able to cover the role because she was under 16 and the role requires brief nudity.

She remained in the cast until December 2007, when she began rehearsals for the role of Natalie, the angsty teenage daughter of a woman with manic-depression in the musical Next to Normal. She was cast in the role of Natalie for the show's Off-Broadway production at Second Stage Theater. The show later moved to Arena Stage in Washington, D.C. for an out of town tryout and eventually to Broadway at the Booth Theatre. She was nominated for a 2009 Tony Award for Best Actress in a Featured Role in a Musical for her performance, becoming one of the youngest nominees for the award. She left the production on July 18, 2010 (along with co-stars Alice Ripley and Brian d'Arcy James). She was replaced by original Natalie standby Meghann Fahy.

Damiano appeared on Gossip Girl in the 2008 episode entitled "It's a Wonderful Lie."

Following Next to Normal, Damiano originated the role of Mary Jane Watson in the musical Spider-Man: Turn Off the Dark on Broadway. The show, which began previews on November 28, 2010, and, after a record-setting number of previews, opened officially on June 14, 2011, was originally directed by Julie Taymor and later by Philip William McKinley of The Boy from Oz. After almost a year with the show, Damiano played her final performance on November 6, 2011, and was succeeded by Rebecca Faulkenberry from Nov. 10. Following her departure from Spider-Man: Turn Off the Dark, Damiano took part in a variety of readings, workshops, and concert works.

=== 2012–present: Film, return to Broadway, and Off-Broadway theater ===
In 2013, she starred in the acclaimed indie film B-Side, her first movie. Also that year, Damiano joined the Off-Broadway dystopian musical Venice at the Public Theater for a limited run. The cast included Haaz Sleiman, Leslie Odom, Jr., and Uzo Aduba.

On November 9, 2015, it was announced that Damiano would return to Broadway (for the first time in four years) and reunite with Spring Awakening composer Duncan Sheik and Next to Normal co-star Alice Ripley in the musical adaptation of American Psycho in the role of Jean (as portrayed by Chloë Sevigny in the 2000 feature film of the same name). The new musical began previews on March 24, 2016, at the Gerald Schoenfeld Theatre on Broadway.

In 2017, Damiano starred in Zack Zadek's musical Deathless at Norma Terris Theater, home of Goodspeed Musicals in Chester, CT. The show was directed by Tina Landau and began performances on June 2, 2017, ending on July 2, 2017. In December 2019, it was announced that Damiano would star alongside Ana Nogueira, Joél Pérez, and Michael Zegen in the world premiere of the screen-to-stage adaptation of Bob & Carol & Ted & Alice by The New Group. In early 2022, she took part in the Off-Broadway adaptation of Black No More, also with The New Group.

== Accolades ==
Damiano was nominated for the Helen Hayes Award for her performance in Next to Normal's out-of-town tryout in D.C. Later, she was nominated for the 2009 Tony Award for Best Performance by a Featured Actress in a Musical when the show moved to Broadway.

In his review in The New York Times following the 2009 Broadway opening, Ben Brantley observed, "The notion that personality is fragile, always on the edge of decomposition, is exquisitely reflected in Ms. Damiano’s astringent, poignant Natalie". Peter Marks of The Washington Post said she "locates a new depth of adolescent disdain and need".

Year	Award Ceremony	Category	Work	Result
2007	Broadway.com Audience Choice Awards	Best Ensemble	Spring Awakening	Won
2009	Helen Hayes Awards	Outstanding Supporting Performer, Non-Resident Production	Next to Normal	Nominated
2009	Tony Awards	Best Featured Actress in a Musical	Next to Normal	Nominated

== Acting credits ==
=== Film ===
Year	Title	Role	Notes
2013	B-Side	April Simon	
2015	4th Man Out	Tracy	
2015	Emily & Tim	Helayne Specter	Segment: "Betrayal"
2018	American Dresser	Kate	
2020	The Surrogate	Rachel	

=== Television ===
Year	Title	Role	Notes
2008	Gossip Girl	Justine	Episode: "It's a Wonderful Lie"
2011	Late Show with David Letterman	Mary Jane Watson	Episode: "Amanda Seyfried/B.J. Novak/Spider-Man: Turn Off the Dark"
2013	It Could Be Worse	Stacy	4 episodes

=== Theater ===
Year	Production	Role	Location	Category
2005	Oliver!	Ensemble	Westchester Broadway Theater	Regional
2006–2007	Spring Awakening	Ensemble (u/s: Anna, Thea, Martha, Ilse)	Eugene O'Neill Theatre	Broadway
2008	Inner Voices: Alice Unwrapped	Alice	The Zipper Factory	Off-Broadway
2008	Next to Normal	Natalie	Second Stage Theater	Off-Broadway
2008	Next to Normal	Natalie	Arena Stage	Regional
2009–2010	Next to Normal	Natalie	Booth Theatre	Broadway
2010–2011	Spider-Man: Turn off the Dark	Mary Jane	Foxwoods Theatre	Broadway
2013	Venice	Willow Turner	The Public Theater	Off-Broadway
2016	American Psycho	Jean	Gerald Schoenfeld Theatre	Broadway
2017	Cruel Intentions: The '90s Musical	Kathryn Merteuil	Le Poisson Rouge	Off-Broadway (pop-up engagement)
2017	Deathless	Hayley	Norma Terris Theatre	Regional
2020	Bob & Carol & Ted & Alice	Carol	Pershing Square Signature Center	Off-Broadway
2022	Black No More		Pershing Square Signature Center	Off-Broadway

== Personal life ==
Damiano married actor Michael Zegen in January 2025. The pair had met while starring in Bob & Carol & Ted & Alice off-Broadway in 2020. Their daughter, Oona Rose Zegen, was born on January 3, 2026.
