= Reprise Theatre Company =

Former American theater company

- Formation: 1997
- Dissolved: 2013
- Type: Theatre group
- Location: Los Angeles, California

The Reprise Theatre Company was a theater company founded by Marcia Seligson in 1997, in Los Angeles, California. Reprise Theatre Company was the resident company at the Freud Playhouse and Wadsworth, staging revival productions.

== History ==
Marcia Seligson served as Founder and Producing Artistic Director from 1997 - 2006. From 1998 - 2001 Ronn Goswick served as the managing director. He left in 2002 when she was joined by Producing Director, Jim Gardia, who stayed with the company in that role until 2008, with a brief stint as Producing Artistic Director during the 2006-07 Season. Danny Feldman took on the role of managing director in 2006 and served in that position until he left in 2010. Jason Alexander became artistic director of the company in 2007. He was joined by Susan Dietz in the role of Producing Director in 2008 until she left in 2010.

Gilles Chiasson joined the company as Producing Director in 2010. Christine Bernardi Weil assumed the role of managing director that same year, both partnering with Jason Alexander to run the company.

After years of well-received performances, the company was forced to cancel several productions in 2011 due to budgetary concerns. In February 2012, the Board announced a production hiatus, citing dwindling ticket sales. In June 2013, a letter to subscribers announced they were ceasing operations due to what the Los Angeles Times reported was difficulty obtaining "sustained funding".

== Seasons ==
=== 2011-2012 season ===
- Cabaret

=== 2010-2011 season ===
- They're Playing Our Song
- Gigi
- Kiss Me, Kate

==== Special events ====
- An Evening With Liz Callaway
- A Party With Marty
- An Evening with Sutton Foster
- Betty Buckley in Broadway By Request
- Barry Manilow In Concert
- Barbara Cook In Concert
- Ray Romano Live

=== 2010 season ===
- Carousel
- A Funny Thing Happened on the Way to the Forum
- How to Succeed in Business Without Really Trying
- Two by Two

==== Special Events ====
- Jerry Seinfeld Live!
- Audra McDonald in Concert
- An Intimate Evening with Marvin Hamlisch

===== Richard Rodgers Celebration =====
- Soul of Rodgers
- Rodgers & Asia
- South Pacific Film Screening
- Rodgers & Hart & Hammerstein
- A Grand Night For Dancing
- Nothin' Like A Dame
- The Sweetest Sounds

=== 2008-09 season ===
- Once on This Island
- I Love My Wife
- Man of La Mancha
- The Fantasticks

==== Special Events ====
- Ben Vereen: Up Close & Musical
- An Evening With Kristin Chenoweth
- Brian Stokes Mitchell Sings Broadway
- Broadway Under The Stars

=== 2007-08 season ===
- On Your Toes
- Damn Yankees
- The Odd Couple
- Li'l Abner
- Flora the Red Menace

==== Special Events ====
- Patti LuPone: Coulda, Woulda, Shoulda
- Carol Burnett in Conversation

=== 2006-07 season ===
- My One and Only
- Sunday in the Park with George
- No Strings

=== 2005-06 season ===
- On the Town
- City of Angels
- Zorba

=== 2004-05 season ===
- Brigadoon
- Pippin
- Applause

=== 2003-04 season ===
- Babes in Arms
- Kismet
- Company

=== 2002-03 season ===
- Anything Goes
- On the Twentieth Century
- She Loves Me

=== 2001-02 season ===
- 1776
- The Most Happy Fella
- Gentlemen Prefer Blondes

=== 2000-01 season ===
- Call Me Madam
- Mack and Mabel
- Strike Up the Band
- Hair

=== 1999 season ===
- Bells Are Ringing
- The Boys from Syracuse
- Fiorello!

=== 1998 season ===
- The Pajama Game
- The Threepenny Opera
- Of Thee I Sing

=== 1997 season ===
- Promises, Promises
- Finian's Rainbow
- Wonderful Town

== Awards and nominations ==
Awards	Production	Nominations	Wins	Notes
2011 LA Drama Critics Circle Awards	Cabaret	2	2	Won McCulloh Award for Revival and Lead Performance
2011 LA Drama Critics Circle Awards	‘’Kiss Me, Kate’’	2	2	Won for Music Direction and Costume Design
2011 Ovation Awards	‘’Kiss Me, Kate’’	14	2	Won for Best Production of a Musical (Large Theater) and Lead Actress in a Musical
2011 Ovation Awards	‘’They’re Playing Our Song’’	1	0	
2011 Ovation Awards	‘’Gigi’’	1	0	
2011 Ovation Awards	‘’Best Season"	1	0	
2010 LA Drama Critics Circle Awards	‘’A Funny Thing Happened on the Way to the Forum’’	1	1	Won for Music Direction
2010 Ovation Awards	‘’How to Succeed in Business Without Really Trying’’	1	1	Won for Lead Actor in a Musical
2010 Ovation Awards	‘’Carousel’’	6	1	Won for Choreography
2010 Ovation Awards	‘’Best Season"	1	0	
2007 LA Drama Critics Circle Awards	‘’On Your Toes’’	2	2	Won for Music Direction and Choreography
2007 Ovation Awards	‘’On Your Toes’’	4	0	
2007 Ovation Awards	‘’No Strings’’	1	0	
2007 Ovation Awards	‘’Sunday in the Park with George’’	1	0	

== See also ==
- Center Theatre Group of Los Angeles
