= David Goldsmith (lyricist) =

American theatre writer and lyricist (born 1962)

David Goldsmith (born September 3, 1962, in Cincinnati, Ohio) is an American theatre writer and lyricist. David is most known for his contribution to the book and story of Motown the Musical, which first opened on Broadway in 2013. He currently lives in Jersey City with his wife, Bryonha Marie Parham.

== Lyrics ==
Shows and films:

- Descendants 3 lyrics, "My Once Upon A Time" (music by John Kavanaugh), sung by Dove Cameron, Disney Channel 2019
- A Christmas Carol animated film voiced by Tim Curry and Whoopi Goldberg
- Hot Shoe Shuffle, 1998 Houston revision of 1992 Australian musical Hot Shoe Shuffle
- Imagine This, musical with music by Shuki Levy, set in the Warsaw Ghetto during World War II, New London Theatre, West End 2008
- Having It All (also book), NoHo Arts Center, North Hollywood 2011, Laguna Playhouse, Laguna Beach 2013
- Motown: The Musical, Broadway (script consultant), 2013
- Invisible Thread, Second Stage Off-Broadway theatre (story consultant), 2015

Individual songs:

- "Luigi's Welcome" from The Adventures of Pinocchio (sung by Jerry Hadley)
- "Up Against The Wind" from Set It Off 1996 crime film, music by Christopher Young, lyrics by David Goldsmith (sung by Lori Perry)
