= Jacqueline Schultz =

American actress

- Born: Queens, New York, U.S.
- Education: Hofstra University
- Occupation: Actress
- Years active: 1979–2004
- Spouse: Larry Bryggman (m. 1982; div. 1987)

Jacqueline Schultz is an American film and television actress.

== Early years ==
Schultz was born in Queens, New York. As a teenager, she wanted a singing career, specifically singing opera. When she was 13, she took vocal and acting lessons. She was active in musical productions and recitals as a student at Northport High School. She went from Northport to Hofstra University, where she graduated with a degree in music.While at Hofstra, she performed in musical theater and classical opera and sang contemporary music.

== Career ==
Schultz's work on stage included acting in summer stock tours of productions that included Cabaret and A Funny Thing Happened on the Way to the Forum. She also made television commercials and worked as a waitress.

In addition to her recurring roles on two television soap operas — as Dee Stewart on As the World Turns (1979–1982); and as the last Patti Tate on Search for Tomorrow (1985–1986) — Schultz has appeared in over twenty-five other television productions, including a brief appearance on the Star Trek: Deep Space Nine episode "Extreme Measures" as Jessica Sloan.

Beginning on January 7, 1986, Schultz portrayed Catherine Simms in the off-Broadway comedy The Foreigner after having been a standby for the play. Her other off-Broadway credits include Pygmalion and Hay Fever.

She has also appeared in three films.

== Personal life ==
Schultz married actor Larry Bryggman in 1982, whom she met while on working on As the World Turns. They divorced in 1987. She is currently married to stage director and playwright Stephen Sachs; they have two children.

== Filmography ==
Year	Film	Role	Genre
1993	Love Bites (also known as Love Bites: The Reluctant Vampire)	Paula	romantic comedy
1997	The Lost World: Jurassic Park	Screamer	science-film thriller
2002	BraceFace Brandi	Mrs. Mabel Crowe	short
