= Venice (musical) =

- Promo art for the Public Theater production
- Music: Matt Sax
- Lyrics: Matt Sax and Eric Rosen
- Book: Eric Rosen
- Productions: 2010 Kansas City Rep; 2010 Los Angeles; 2013 The Public Theater, New York

Venice is a musical collaboration between Matt Sax and Eric Rosen. The plot focuses on a dystopian near-future fictional city named Venice. The show opened at the Copaken Stage in Kansas City in 2010 as a co-production between Kansas City Rep and Center Theatre Group. Venice also ran at the Public Theater in New York from May 28 through June 30, 2013. The cast of Venice at The Public includes Uzo Aduba, Jennifer Damiano, Jonathan-David, Claybourne Elder, Leslie Odom, Jr., Victoria Platt, Angela Polk, Matt Sax, and Haaz Sleiman.

The Kansas City production received regional and national attention for its unique use of hip-hop and multimedia elements. Time Magazine called it "the next major American musical", citing its timely allusions to post-9/11 America and the election of President Barack Obama.

== Plot ==
The city of Venice has been at war for a generation. Venice Monroe, who was named for the city, is sworn in as the new leader of the city, promising to bring change to the society. A symbolic wedding is planned between Venice and his childhood friend, Willow. Venice's half-brother, Markos, is a commander in the city's military. He plots to disrupt the wedding and keep the public in fear.

In many ways, the musical parallels William Shakespeare's Othello. There are two men in this musical who are in love with the same woman; there are main characters who are Generals and military advisors. The men are power-hungry, driven to possess (be it a lover, a territory or a political seat) and that power becomes their undoing. In the end, it destroys all the players, an earmark of Shakespeare's tragedies. The musical also has more straightforward references to Othello, such as the song "Put out the Light," which may have been a reference to Act V, Scene 2 of the play when Othello states "Put out the light, and then put out the light," comparing his torch to the life of Desdemona and the song "Willow," which has lyrics adapted from a song that Desdemona sings in Act IV, Scene 3 and Emilia sings in Act V, Scene 2.

=== Act I ===
20 years before the story begins, the government of the state of Venice is destroyed by a massive terrorist attack that kills tens of thousands. A military occupation divides the nation into a Safe Zone for the elites, and leaves the rest trapped in the ruins of the fallen city. The Clown MC, our narrator and guide, describes life under military occupation and introduces Venice Monroe, a charismatic leader with a plan to restore the nation's democracy. When a massive peace demonstration threatens to spin out of control, the city is stunned by the miraculous appearance of Willow Turner, daughter of the assassinated President, whose arrival signals the symbolic reunification of the people. The two heroes announce their intention to marry and lead the reunification effort together—to the shock of her supposed fiancé, Theodore Westbrook, heir to the reins of the military occupation. The nation erupts into the first expression of hope and joy in 20 years (“Citizens of Venice”).

Venice's half-brother Markos, a leading general in the military, reels from the news. His secret plan to overthrow Westbrook and rule the nation himself has been undone by his brother's actions. When Theo comes to him to help get Willow back, Markos realizes his chance to find a different path to the crown (“Last Man”).

Venice and Willow, alone now, celebrate their impossible victory (“Waited All These Years”). They are joined by Michael Victor, Willow's childhood best friend, who defected to the city and has become Venice's most trusted ally. Markos surprises all three, announcing his loyalty to their cause. He convinces his brother that Westbrook wants peace, and will open the borders for the first time to allow all citizens to celebrate their marriage. As he gains Venice's trust, Markos's plan is set in motion. Later that night, Willow and Venice are alone in her room. Venice begins to tell Willow the story of his mother, who was killed alongside Willow's father in their fight for peace and national unity (“Anna”). Their shared history affirms their love, and Venice offers Willow all he has left of his mother, her necklace. Meanwhile, Markos's wife Emilia laments the struggle of her marriage, until Markos convinces her to befriend Willow on the day of her wedding (“City at Sleep”).

Later that night, Markos enlists the aid of Hailey Daisy, a celebrated music star and pawn of the military, to seduce Michael Victor as he plans security for the next day's wedding (“Hailey Daisy”). The next morning is the day of the wedding, and the city is infused with newfound hope for a better future. Emilia befriends Willow, Venice entrusts Michael with security, and Theo mourns the loss of his beloved fiancée ("Sunrise"). That night, people from the Safe Zone pour into the city to celebrate reunification ("Liberation (Pull up the People)"). The celebration becomes chaotic and joyful, and Hailey draws Michael into the celebration. Michael realizes too late that something isn't right, and as the wedding procession begins, a terrifying explosion ends the first act.

=== Act II ===
Terrified and confused, Michael Victor relives the explosion and its aftermath, only to be shown by the ghost of Anna and the Clown MC that the body in the coffin is his own (“Never Wish War on a People”).

His funeral begins (“Final Hour Hymn”). Willow is destroyed by the loss of her best friend and questions the choices she has made (“If Only”). At the funeral, Markos suggests to Venice that Willow's true affection may have been for Theo, and raises the possibility that they might have been working against him. A fight escalates between Theo and Venice, until Willow explodes at Venice, blaming him for the carelessness that allowed the tragedy to happen. As the funeral ends, Venice leaves, enraged, while Theo learns that he is unwittingly responsible for Michael's death –- which is overheard by a frightened Emilia, who starts to understand Markos's motives.

The people of the city demand revenge in the aftermath of the attack, and as civil war looms, Markos convinces Venice that Westbrook, Willow, and Michael have been plotting against him the whole time (“Poison”). His jealousy and sense of betrayal boils over when Willow runs into the room, and after a struggle, he strikes her. Nearly past hope, Willow is consoled by Emilia, who knows but can't reveal the plot her husband is weaving. Willow wonders if she was fated to die, and the two women realize that only their bond and their courage might set things right (“Willow”).

On the streets, violence rises. The Clown MC and Venice express their outrage and grief at the turn of events (“Wings”). When a terrified Hailey Daisy emerges from hiding to seek Venice's protection, he misunderstands her confession. As she tries to escape, she is shot and killed. Amid the chaos of the riots, Markos is seen over another dead body—Theo Westbrook. Anna, the Clown MC, and the ghosts of the city revive Theo, and we learn about his courageous attempt to save Willow and the city. Hours earlier, Willow begged Theo to stop Markos and to give up his dream of love for her. He confronts Markos and announces the end of the violence—but before he can succeed, Markos kills him and he is led to join the ghosts of the city (“I Wanna be Great”).

In the church, a nearly insane Venice confronts the memory of his mother and his rage at his failure to redeem her legacy (“Put out the Light”). Willow enters, begging Venice to stop the escalating war. He accuses her of plotting against him, and she almost convinces him of the truth, until Markos steps in, demanding that he kill Willow. Emilia runs into the church in time to reveal Markos's entire plot. Caught, Markos runs to stab his wife, but Willow steps in the way and is mortally wounded. Markos is arrested, and a grief-stricken Venice realizes his mistake too late as Willow dies. In his grief, Venice runs for the knife to kill himself, but Emilia stops him, begging him to honor the dead by stopping the war (“We’re Not Children Anymore”).

The Clown MC summons the dead and living characters back to the stage, imploring the audience to choose a different path in a real world haunted by far worse violence and tragedy, and that only a new kind of greatness can lead the world to peace.

== Characters ==
- Clown MC (Matt Sax) - leads the audience through the performance, ostensibly writing the script as the audience is seeing it.
- Venice Monroe (Haaz Sleiman) - the protagonist, newly elected mayor of Venice.
- Markos Monroe (Leslie Odom, Jr.) - Venice's half-brother, a military commander who seeks power through endless war.
- Anna Monroe (Uzo Aduba) - Venice and Markos's mother, a revolutionary who died in the initial attack a generation ago.
- Emilia Monroe (Victoria Platt) - Markos's wife, whom he uses as a pawn in his plots against his brother.
- Willow Turner (Jennifer Damiano) - the dead President's daughter, who has spent her entire life in the Safe Zone; she agrees to marry Venice to help bring peace to the city.
- Michael Victor (Claybourne Elder) - Willow's childhood friend and director of the city's security.
- Theodore Westbrook (Jonathan-David) - a war profiteer who allows Markos to manipulate his love for Willow into nefarious ends.
- Hailey Daisy (Angela Polk) - an entertainer who uses her powers of seduction to weaken the city's defenses.
- Ensemble (Emilee Duprée, Semhar Ghebremichael, Devin L. Roberts, Manuel Stark)
