= Simon Levy =

American playwright and theater director (born 1949)

- Born: May 12, 1949 (age 77); Surrey, England
- Occupations: Playwright; theater director; producer
- Website: simonlevy.com

Simon Levy (born May 12, 1949) is an American theater director and playwright who has been the producing director and dramaturge with the Fountain Theatre in Los Angeles since 1993.

== Biography ==
Levy was born in Surrey, England and grew up in San Francisco. He graduated from City College of San Francisco with an Associate in Arts and San Francisco State University with a BA and MA in theater, and began his career as an actor in San Francisco, primarily with the New Shakespeare Company and then the Alley Theater in Houston, Texas. Prior to studying theater, he was a music major, played the saxophone, and was a jazz and rock-and-roll musician. He made his debut as a professional stage director in 1980 at the One Act Theatre Company in San Francisco, where he focused on the development of new work, directing many of the plays of Michael Lynch, among others, and at the Magic Theatre, directing the plays of Lynne Kaufman, among others. He moved to Los Angeles in 1990 and joined the staff of the Fountain Theatre in 1993. He has taught playwriting at UCLA Writer's Extension and Chapman University, been a site evaluator for the National Endowment for the Arts and the California Arts Council, and is a member of numerous theater and humanitarian organizations, including the Dramatists Guild, Society for Directors and Choreographers, and Literary Managers and Dramaturgs of the Americas.

== Selected works ==
- What I Heard About Iraq, an anti-Iraq War play adapted from Eliot Weinberger's prose poem and performed at the Edinburgh Fringe Festival and Adelaide Fringe Festival (where it won Fringe First Awards) among other productions worldwide. (2006)
- Levy's stage adaptation of The Great Gatsby, published by Dramatists Play Service—authorized and granted exclusive rights by the Fitzgerald Estate—has had over 600 productions worldwide and continues to be produced. The play inaugurated the Guthrie Theater's new complex, was subsequently produced at Seattle Repertory Theatre, and was a finalist for the PEN Award in Drama. (2007)
- F. Scott Fitzgerald's The Last Tycoon and Tender is the Night.
- Award-winning and critically acclaimed premiere of Stephen Sachs' Cyrano a co-production of the Fountain Theatre and Deaf West Theatre (2012)
- Mark Harelik's The Immigrant for Sierra Madre Playhouse, where it received rave reviews. (2018)

== Awards and recognition ==
Levy is the recipient of numerous directing and producing awards, including the Los Angeles Drama Critics Circle's Milton Katselas Career Achievement Award in Directing.
