= Bill Cain =

American playwright and Jesuit

Bill Cain, SJ (c. 1947–), is an American playwright and Jesuit priest. He founded a Shakespeare company in Boston, and the New York Times has praised him for his "impish humor".

== Works ==
Cain wrote the play Stand Up Tragedy and the play Nine Circles.

He was the co-creator of the television series Nothing Sacred, a drama series that depicted daily life in a modern Catholic parish, which aired in 1997-98 on ABC. He won a Humanitas Prize and a Writers Guild of America Award for the show.

His play Equivocation premiered at the Oregon Shakespeare Festival in Ashland, Oregon, in 2009. Bill Rauch, Artistic Director of OSF, directed; Shag was played by Anthony Heald, Richard and Ensemble by Richard Elmore, Nate and Ensemble by Jonathan Haugen, Sharpe and Ensemble by John Tufts, Armin and Ensemble by Gregory Linington, and Judith by Christine Albright. The same cast later appeared at Seattle Repertory Theater as well. It was later produced at City Center in New York City in March 2010, and as part of the 2014 season at Will Geer's Theatricum Botanicum in Topanga, California, with Ted Barton, Alan Blumenfeld, Dane Oliver, Franc Ross, Taylor Jackson Ross, and Paul Turbiak in Mike Peebler's production. The Los Angeles production was hailed by the Los Angeles Times as a Critics' Choice.

His play How to Write a New Book for the Bible was produced at Seattle's REP, January 13 to February 5, 2012, and afterwards, at various venues around the country. The play is based on Cain's own family.

He has published two titles with Orbis Books: The Diary of Jesus Christ (2021) and The Book of Cain: on Adding a New Book to the Family Bible (2023).
