= A House Not Meant to Stand =

Play by Tennessee Williams

- Original language: English
- Written by: Tennessee Williams
- Genre: Black comedy
- Setting: Pascagoula, Mississippi

Premiere
- Date: April 1982
- Place: Goodman Theatre; Chicago

A House Not Meant to Stand is the last play written by Tennessee Williams. It was produced during the 1981–82 season at the Goodman Theatre in Chicago by Gregory Mosher and published for the first time in 2008 by New Directions. with a foreword by Gregory Mosher and an Introduction by Thomas Keith.

== Plot ==
Subtitled A Gothic Comedy, the play is set during the Christmas holiday in the deteriorating Pascagoula, Mississippi house of Cornelius and Bella McCorkle, who have just buried their eldest son, a gay man Cornelius banished from the home years earlier. During a raging storm, heavy drinker Cornelius, who once had political aspirations, tries to get Bella, who suffers from mild dementia, to disclose where she concealed the considerable amount of money she inherited from her grandfather, who accumulated his wealth by making and selling moonshine. When she refuses to cooperate, her husband threatens to have her institutionalized, just as he did their daughter Joanie. Coming to her rescue is their negligent youngest son Charlie, who has returned home with his zealously religious pregnant fiancée Stacey in tow.

== History ==
The play is derived from a one-act titled Some Problems for the Moose Lodge (published in 2011 in The Magic Tower & Other One-Act Plays) that was staged—together with A Perfect Analysis Given by a Parrot and The Frosted Glass Coffin—under the umbrella title Tennessee Laughs by the Goodman Theatre in 1980. Director Gary Tucker and Goodman artistic director Gregory Mosher urged Williams to expand it into a full-length play. The playwright returned to his home in Key West and began working on what was now called A House Not Meant to Stand, a title suggested by a production assistant on Tennessee Laughs. Williams called it a "Southern Gothic spook sonata," a deliberate reference to an August Strindberg play known as The Ghost Sonata in its English translation. The crumbling house was a metaphor for contemporary society, while the characters were drawn from the Williams family, notably his father Cornelius, his aunt Belle, his paternal grandfather, and his brother Dakin. The play opened in late April 1982 at the Goodman, where it did respectable business through the end of May. Time, calling it "a rich collection of scarred characters," said it was the best play Williams had written in a decade.

Williams received a $15,000 commission to write a new play for the New World Festival of the Arts, held June 4–26, 1982 in Miami. His original offering, called Now, the Cats with Jeweled Claws, was rejected, ostensibly for being too short. As a substitute, A House Not Meant to Stand was transferred, its production intact, from Chicago’s Goodman Theatre. Reviewing the play from Miami for The Boston Phoenix, Carolyn Clay remarked that " What makes A House Not Meant To Stand so shaky is that though the author means it to be funny, even grotesque, he can no more carve out its bittersweetness than he could his own heart. ... Although Williams retains his ability to write stage poetry buttressed by crisp, eccentric dialogue, he seems to have lost his carpenterial skills. It’s a good thing this house isn’t meant to stand since it would take a concrete high-rise to accommodate all that Williams has stuffed into it."
