= Equivocation (play) =

Play written by Bill Cain

Equivocation is a 2009 play by Bill Cain that premiered at the Oregon Shakespeare Festival. It takes place in an alternate history in 17th Century England where Robert Cecil commissions William Shakespeare (referred to as Shagspeare) to write an official history play about the Gunpowder Plot to assassinate King James I.

== Synopsis ==
=== Act 1 ===
London. 1605. A room. Sir Robert Cecil has called for Master William Shagspeare (Shag for short) to commission a play for King James. After reading what it is he should write about, Shag quickly rejects the offer, but is overpowered by Cecil and is forced to take the commission. The scene suddenly turns into one of Shag's plays as actors (Nate, Armin, Richard, and Sharpe) come out performing a scene from King Lear, which Sharpe claims is unplayable. Shag breaks up the argument and tells them how Cecil called upon him, and how he has been commissioned to write a true history of the Gunpowder Plot. Shag tells them he's wary, since current events have never been done on the stage, but his actors claim he's "the man for the job". With that, Shag begins to write.

Enter Judith, Shag's daughter, who looks at the darker aspects of life. After asking him how many people he's killed off in his new play, she gives him clothing to go change into. There is obvious tension between the two. While Shag changes off stage, Judith gives a soliloquy to the audience about how she hates both plays and soliloquies. Shag reenters, scolding her for messing with his work. Shag asks Judith how her twin brother is doing, and she reminds him that her brother is dead. She tells him to ask about her, in which he replies, "You're always the same." When Judith exits Shag's work comes to life. A scene unfolds, in Shakespearean tongue, of three conspirators (played by Nate, Richard, and Sharpe) meeting with the Jesuit priest Henry Garnet (played by Armin) about how they plan on blowing up Parliament. After playing out the whole scene all the actors and Shag, with the exception of Sharpe, agree that it just doesn't work. Sharpe then suggests that they change the ending and blow up Parliament, and is immediately berated by Richard about how it is a terrible idea to put on a play about blowing up a king in the presence of the king. Nate and Armin mention how they don't understand how thirteen gentlemen could go about digging a tunnel under Parliament without getting caught, which gets Shag thinking.

Shag makes a trip back to see Cecil, who is annoyed that Shag has yet to finish the play. Shag tells Cecil he wants to know about the dirt ("Dirt? What dirt?"), which Cecil refuses to tell him of. After arguing some more, Shag tells Cecil how there is (in the story) no plot, to which Cecil, outraged, replies, "It is treason to say so!" When Shag says how he was just giving literary criticism, Cecil realizes his misunderstanding and acts like he said nothing. Shag also apologizes to Cecil for portraying Cecil's father as Polonius in Hamlet. He then asks to interview Thomas Wintour, a conspirator in the Gunpowder Plot. Cecil agrees. The next scene unfolds to show Wintour being suspended, with guards telling him how exactly he's going to be executed. Shag meets with Wintour, who at first refuses to speak with him. Shag is about to leave but when he sees how Wintour can't even write a letter to his wife because his hands are so damaged, Shag agrees to write Wintour's wife a letter if Wintour helps him. Wintour tells Shag of how Robert Catesby called a meeting to first start the plot. Catesby tells Wintour how Cecil gave him the gunpowder, supposedly for a military expedition on the continent. He also tells him of a room underneath Parliament where the deed can be done. Astonished, Shag asks Wintour about Garnet's role in this. Wintour informs him how Garnet was never in on the plan. Wintour, Catesby, and the other conspirators turn back into Shag's actors, who are just as astonished by the new play as Shag is. Richard tells them they can't do the show because it is far too dangerous to perform, but Shag insists. Richard realizes why Shag wants to do this so badly and tells Shag, "Helping someone else's son won't bring back yours."

Cecil then arrives at the Globe, wanting a word with Shag. He tells Shag how he has gotten his hands on a copy of the new script and does not deem it worthy to be performed. When Shag asks how he got a copy, Cecil insinuates there might be one or more moles in his theatre company. He then takes the letter Wintour wrote to his wife away from Shag. Wintour's execution is announced. Shag begs for them to let him live, but Cecil will not comply. Wintour recites a poem before being hung, and then is cut down (while he is still alive), cut open, and then has his head cut off. At the final moments of the first act Cecil says, "Behold! The head of a traitor!" and holds up Wintour's severed head. Suddenly, the eyes of Wintour open and he whispers, "Thou liest." Blackout.

=== Act 2 ===
The second act starts in a courtroom at the trial of the Jesuit priest, Henry Garnet. Prosecutor Edward Coke asks Garnet if he knew the conspirators of the plot, which he denies, but he then affirms knowing Robert Catesby, Thomas Wintour, and all of the other accused except Guy Fawkes, explaining that he did not know them as conspirators. When Cecil challenges him to answer using plain "yes" and "no", he tells of a hypothetical scenario in which the King was seeking shelter from the Spanish in Coke's house, asking whether he would tell the Spanish the King was inside—betray the King or deliberately lie. Coke, trapped by Garnet's words, ends the trial and orders that Garnet be removed to his cell.

Later, Shag comes to Garnet's cell disguised as a jailor, which Garnet quickly sees through. He tells Garnet he has come to learn to equivocate—to tell the truth in his play without getting caught at it. Garnet gives him the same hypothetical scenario and asks him what the Spanish are really asking, but Shag can't figure it out.

== Productions ==
The play was first produced at the Oregon Shakespeare Festival in Ashland, Oregon. It premiered April 15, 2009, and closed on October 31, 2009.

Seattle Repertory Theatre in partnership with Oregon Shakespeare Festival presented the play in Seattle from 18 November through 13 December 2009. As in Ashland, it was directed by Bill Rauch with Anthony Heald, Christine Albright, Jonathan Haugen, Richard Elmore, John Tufts and Gregory Linington.

The play appeared at the New York City Center in March, 2010 with John Pankow, Charlotte Parry, Remy Auberjonois, Michael Countryman, David Furr and David Pittu. Garry Hynes directed.

It was produced by the Circa Theatre, Wellington, New Zealand where it ran from 24 May to 21 June 2014. It was directed by Peter Hamilton and performed by Andrew Foster, Paul McLaughlin, Tom Eason, Jason Whyte, Gavin Rutherford and Tai Berdinner-Blades. At the time the Sheilah Winn National Shakespeare competition was being held, and student groups attending or competing were encouraged to attend the performance.

It has also been produced at Bard on the Beach Shakespeare Festival in Vancouver, Canada – being performed for a fixed run from July 2, 2014, to September 27, 2014.

The play was part of the 2014 season at Will Geer's Theatricum Botanicum in Topanga, California, with Ted Barton, Alan Blumenfeld, Dane Oliver, Franc Ross, Taylor Jackson Ross, and Paul Turbiak in Mike Peebler's production hailed by the Los Angeles Times as a "Critics' Choice."

The play was produced as part of the 2015 season at the Shakespeare Theatre of New Jersey, directed by Paul Mullins. Cast included James Michael Reilly (Shag), Rob Krakovski (Richard/Garnet), Kevin Isola (Armin and others), Matthew Stucky (Sharpe/Tom Wintour/James), Dominic Comperatore (Nate/Cecil), and Therese Barbato (Judith).

The play was produced by the Atlanta Shakespeare Company on April 23-May 8, 2016 as part of its 2015–16 season with Artistic Director Jeff Watkins taking the role of William Shagspeare.

== Breaking up the roles ==
Equivocation, though it has many roles, was never intended to have a large cast. The intention was always to have six actors. Because of this, four of the six actors are meant to carry the weight of the show by taking on ten or more roles each.

=== Original cast ===
- Anthony Heald – William Shagspeare
- Christine Albright – Judith, Shag's daughter
- Jonathan Haugen – Nate/Cecil/Ensemble
- Richard Elmore – Richard/Henry Garnet/Ensemble
- John Tufts – Sharpe/Thomas Wintour/King James/Ensemble
- Gregory Linington – Armin, the script keeper/Sir Edward Coke/Robert Catesby/Ensemble
