= Victoria Matlock =

American musical theatre actress

- Born: Victoria Matlock; Salt Lake City, Utah, U.S.
- Education: University of Northern Colorado
- Occupations: Stage actress, singer
- Website: www.victoriamatlock.com

Victoria Matlock (born in Salt Lake City, Utah) is an American musical theatre actress. She appeared in the Broadway and Off-Broadway productions of Million Dollar Quartet in the role of Dyanne.

She has been involved in several regional theatre productions including Godspell and The Sound of Music. She has also performed in Cats at the Hangar Theatre in Ithaca, New York, as Grizzabella and in the original production of Saving Aimee by Kathie Lee Gifford. She performed in the national tour of The Full Monty and the national tour of Evita, supervised by Hal Prince.

== Early life ==
Victoria Matlock was born on February 3, 1978, in Salt Lake City, Utah. She was drawn to the stage from a young age. Victoria was a creative person from early on, being involved with such things as singing, acting, dancing, painting and purse making. Victoria's first performance was in The Ugly Duckling as the title character, at the age of four. From there she performed at the Junior Shakespeare Company and in the University of Utah's Theatre for Youth program. At the age of 13 her father took her to see The Phantom of the Opera in New York City, which inspired her to pursue a career in musical theatre. Matlock attended the University of Northern Colorado, where she appeared in The Man Who Came to Dinner (Lorraine), The Taming of the Shrew (Kate), Always Patsy Cline (Patsy Cline), and Evita (Eva Perón). After obtaining her degree Victoria moved to New York City.

== Career ==
Once in New York, Victoria auditioned for many different shows and was cast in TheatreWorks USA's production of Lyle, Lyle, Crocodile as Mrs. Primm. After that Victoria went on to star in other shows such as Godspell (as Joanne), Baby Case (Studio Sister/ The Secretary), The Sound of Music (as Maria) and Cats (as Grizabella). She was also a part of the national tours of The Full Monty (as Susan, understudy for Pam, Vicki) and Evita (as Sister, Nurse). Victoria was also seen in Jekyll & Hyde in Concert (as Emma Carew, Dr. Jekyll's fiancé).

=== Wicked and other projects ===
In March 2006, she assumed the role of standby for the lead role of Elphaba on the first North American tour of Wicked. She covered the role multiple times for Julia Murney and later, Shoshana Bean. On January 3, 2007, she took over as lead for a 10-month stint, before exiting the company on November 4, 2007. During this time, she starred opposite Kendra Kassebaum and, later, Christina DeCicco as Glinda.

Victoria starred as Mary Magdalene in Jesus Christ Superstar with the Maine State Music Theatre. The run lasted from June 4 through to the 21st of 2008. As well as concert, The Grass is Always Greener for friend/composer Will Van Dkye.

She played Cindy Lou at the Westside Theatre in the off-Broadway show The Marvelous Wonderettes. Victoria left the production on June 7, 2009.

She also starred in a musical adaptation of The First Wives Club, which played at San Diego's Old Globe Theatre from July 17 - August 30, 2009.
