= Life Could Be a Dream =

Life Could Be a Dream may refer to:

- Life Could Be a Dream (film), a 2026 Australian film
- Life Could Be a Dream (musical), a jukebox musical by Roger Bean that premiered in 2009
- Life Could Be a Dream, an album by 90s punk band Auntie Christ
- Life Could Be a Dream, a 1986 short film about Nick Mason of Pink Floyd and his interest in motor racing
- "Sh-Boom", sometimes referred to as "Life Could Be a Dream", a doo-wop song published in 1954
