= Utah Shakespeare Festival =

Annual Theatrical Festival in Cedar City, Utah, United States

Coordinates: 37°40′34.61″N 113°4′4.73″W

- Begins: June, annually
- Ends: October, annually
- Venue: The Beverley Taylor Sorenson Center for the Arts
- Location: Cedar City, UT
- Founded: 1961
- Founders: Fred C. Adams
- Attendance: Nearly 100,000
- Budget: Over $7 million
- Website: bard.org

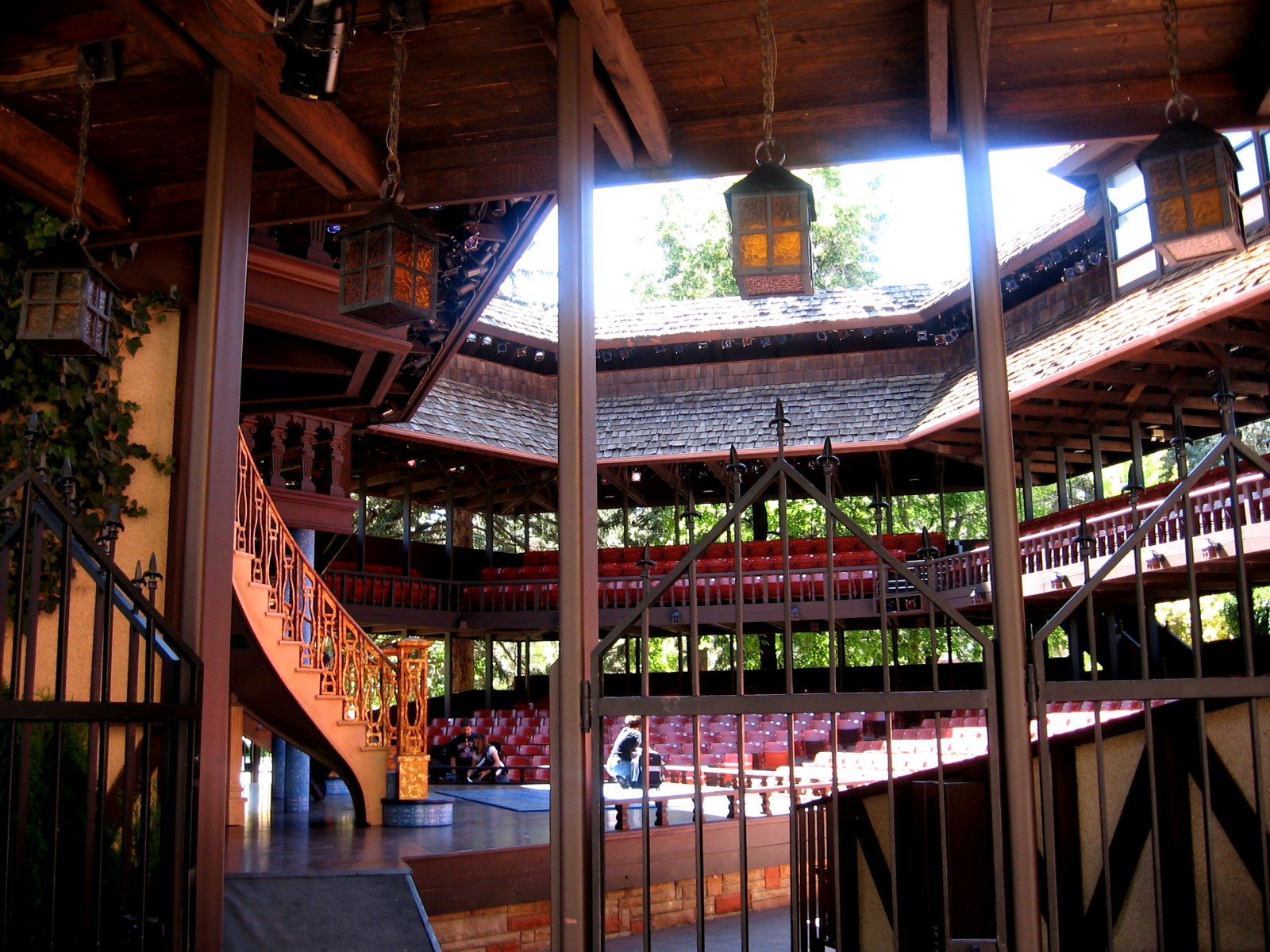
Interior of the Adams Memorial Theatre, a replica of the Globe Theatre.

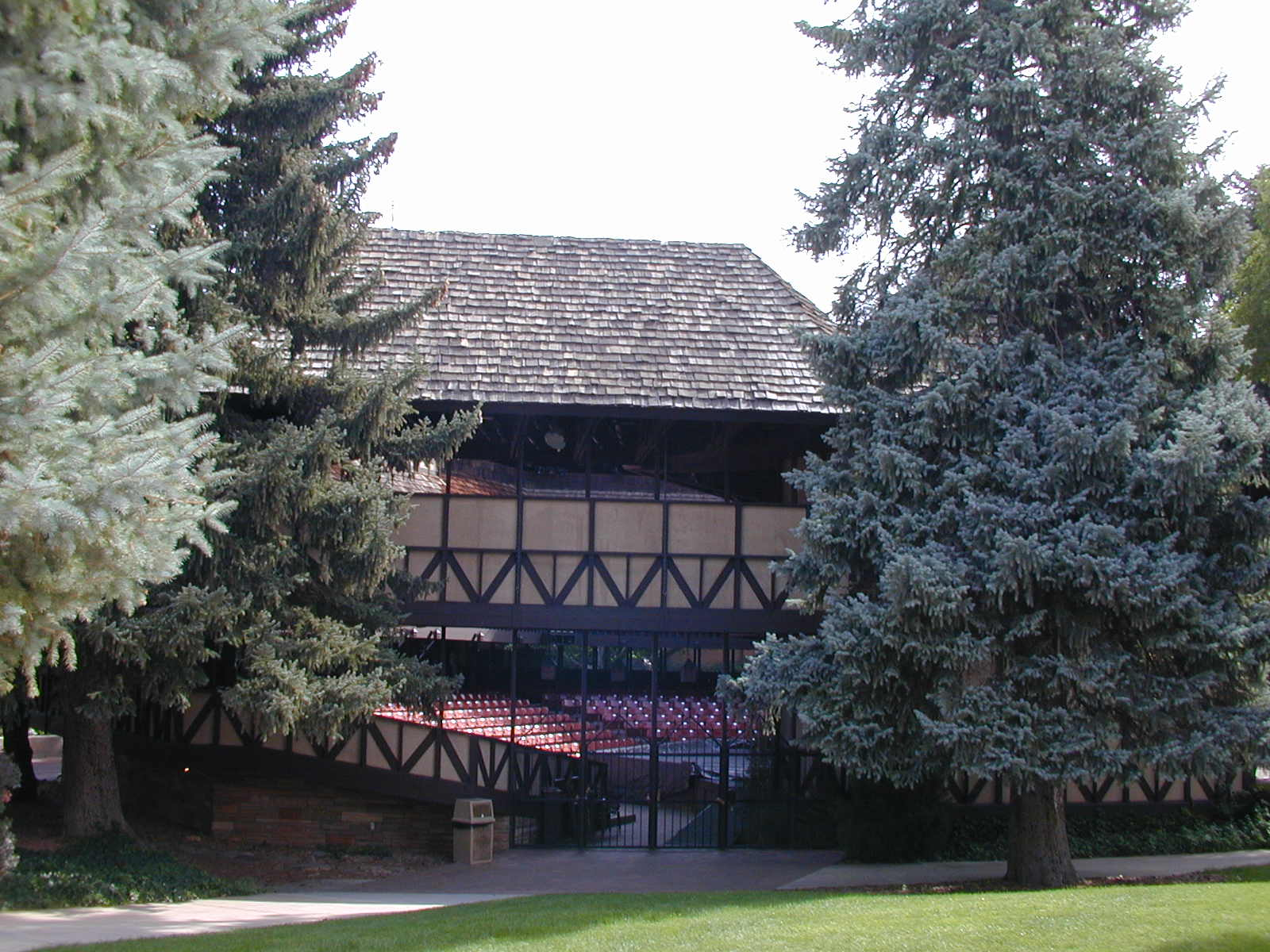
West elevation of The Adams Memorial Theatre

The Utah Shakespeare Festival is a theatrical festival that performs works by Shakespeare as its cornerstone. The Festival is held during the summer and early fall at The Beverly Taylor Sorenson Center for the Arts in Cedar City, Utah, United States, in conjunction with Southern Utah University.

== History ==
The Festival was founded in 1961, and presented its first season in 1962.

The idea for the Utah Shakespeare Festival originated in Cedar City, Utah, when Fred C. Adams, a theatre professor at the College of Southern Utah (now Southern Utah University), and his fiancée, Barbara Gaddie, discussed the possibility of establishing a Shakespeare festival while doing their laundry at the local Fluffy Bundle Laundromat.

Adams had visited the Oregon Shakespeare Festival the previous year (1960) and was inspired by its approach to producing Shakespearean theatre. He and Gaddie believed that Cedar City would be a suitable location for a similar festival because of the large number of tourists who traveled through the area each summer to visit nearby national parks.

During their conversation at the laundromat, the couple recorded their ideas on a yellow notepad, outlining plans for the foundations that would later develop into the Utah Shakespeare Festival.

In 1961, Fred directed a student production of The Taming of the Shrew to test community interest in holding a Shakespeare festival. This initial test was successful, and inspired Adams and Gaddie to pursue their idea. The two were able to garner support, and with the help of students and local residents, built a simple outdoor stage, props, and created costumes for the festival's first season in 1962.

The inaugural season began on July 2, 1962 with productions of The Taming of the Shrew, The Merchant of Venice, and Hamlet. With the help of a $1,000 loan from the local Lions Club, and support from the community, the first season was deemed a success, enabling Adams and Gaddie to produce a second season.

The festival's success continued season after season, allowing for the festival to grow and expand from their original stage on the grass to the purpose built Adams Memorial Theatre in 1977.

1989 saw the opening of an additional theater purpose build for the festival. The Randall L. Jones, an indoor theatre, was opened as a state of the art facility to host additional productions and allow for matinee productions at the festival.

The Utah Shakespeare Festival received a Tony Award for Outstanding Regional Theatre in 2000.

2016 saw the dedication of the newly completed Beverley Taylor Sorenson Center for the Arts, a complex purpose built in Cedar City for the festival. This complex includes the Randall L. Jones Theatre, the outdoor Engelstad Shakespeare Theatre, the Eileen and Allen Anes Studio Theatre, administrative offices for the festival,The Greenshow stage, a seminar grove, statue gardens, and the Southern Utah Museum of Art.

Festival founder, Fred C. Adams, remained involved with the festival until his death in February 2020. Adams built the festival from his humble laundromat vision in 1961 into today's multi-million dollar award winning festival.

The Utah Shakespeare Festival celebrated its 65th season in 2026.

== The Greenshow ==
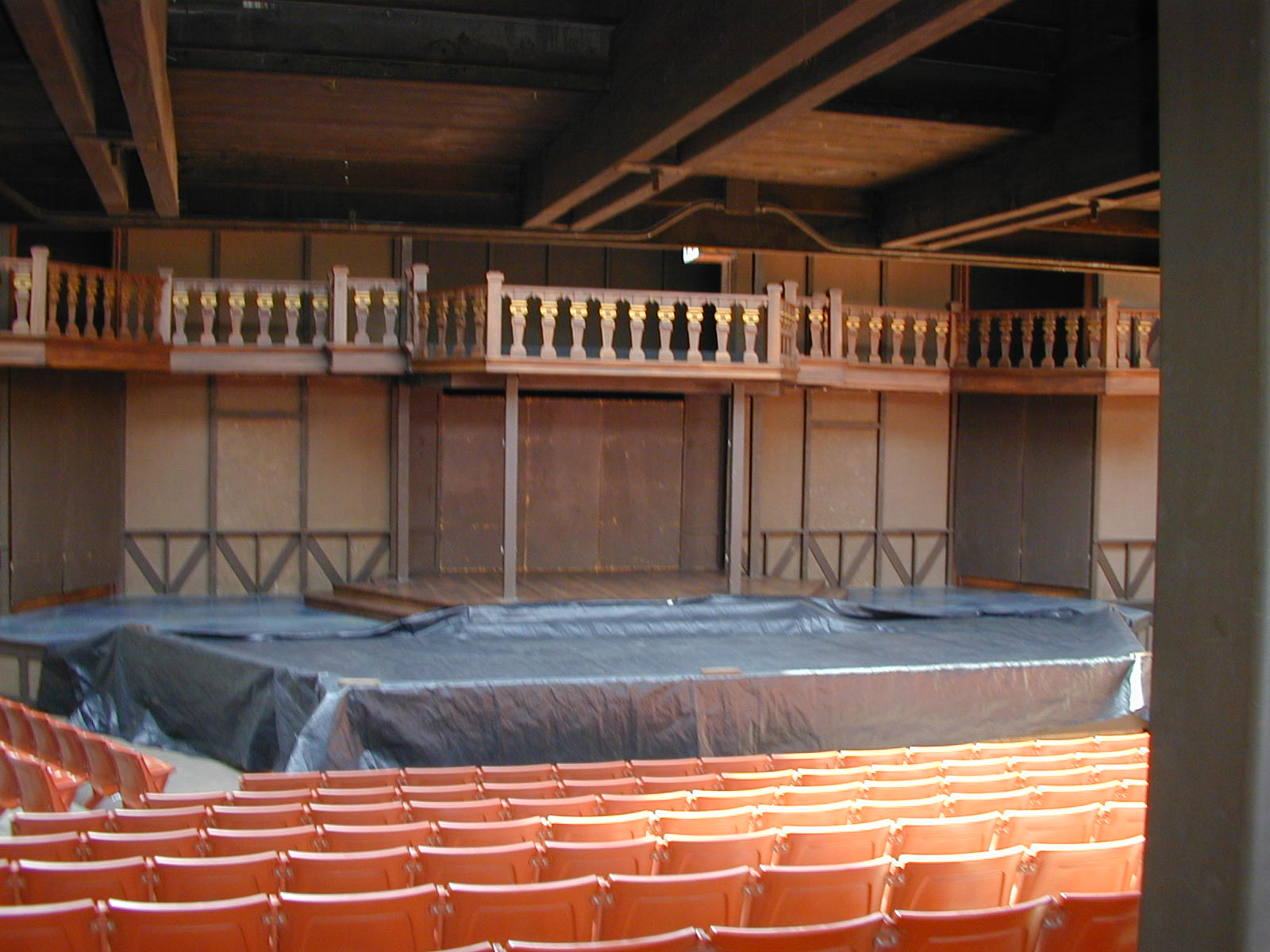
The Adams Memorial Theatre stage

During the summer months of the festival, The Greenshow is performed outdoors before the evening productions. The Greenshow often includes comedic skits, sword fighting, and musical routines with dancing. In recent years, these performances have often been themed to coincide with the evening production (example: Greenshow actors wearing kilts and singing Scottish songs on the evenings Macbeth was performed during the 2025 season). During and before the performance people dressed (roughly) in period clothing walk around the courtyard (green) selling programs, telling jokes, and offering a variety of treats. The Greenshow is free to attend.

Executive Managing Director of the festival, Michael Bahr, on The Greenshow: "It's a fundamental part of the festival experience... Since the first years of the festival, patrons have been immersed in a live theatrical experience, preparing them for the evening that awaits."

== Theatres ==
Theatres currently or previously used by the Utah Shakespeare Festival in Cedar City, Utah.

=== Temporary Outdoor Stage ===
When the festival began in 1962, a temporary outdoor stage was built on a grassy site of the College of Southern Utah (now SUU) campus. The temporary stage had a capacity of 300 seats for festival goers. As the festival continued to gain popularity year after year, it became evident that a more permanent solution was required, and the Adams Memorial Shakespearean Theatre was commissioned.

=== The Adams Memorial Shakespearean Theatre ===
The Adams Memorial Shakespearean Theatre opened in 1977, and was retired at the end of the 2015 season. The "Adams" theatre was designed to replicate Shakespeare's Globe Theatre, and had a capacity of 887 people. In 1981, the BBC used the Adams theatre to film a television program about William Shakespeare; at that time, the Adams was the best replica of The Globe Theatre. Actor Sam Wanamaker visited the Adams theatre for ideas while raising money to build the new Shakespeare's Globe in London, England. Actor Jeremy Irons, a member of the Royal Shakespeare Company at the time of his visit to the Adams theatre remarked, "You come to Utah and there's your language, there's Shakespeare. It's wonderful, it's like coming home."

After 38 years of operation, the Adams Theatre held its final performance on September 5, 2015. Festival founder Fred C. Adams carried a lit candle from the stage of the Adams to the new (Engelstad) construction site to signify the continuance of the festival's dedication to theatrical excellence. The Adams Theatre was returned to the stewardship of Southern Utah University to use for educational programs at the university.

=== Randall L. Jones Theatre ===
The Randall L. Jones Theatre is an indoor theatre with a capacity of approximately 770 people. The "Randall", as festival goers refer to it, opened June 23, 1989. The theatre hosts matinee and evening productions, usually featuring non-Shakespearean productions, such as musicals, comedies, and dramas. The Beverly Taylor Sorenson Center for the Arts was built to include the Randall L. Jones Theatre as part of its campus. The Randall has often been noted for its architectural beauty, and was featured in Architecture magazine's August 1990 edition.

=== Engelstad Shakespeare Theatre ===
The Englestad Shakespeare Theatre is an outdoor theatre built in the style of Shakespeare's Globe Theatre. The theatre is part of the Beverly Taylor Sorenson Center for the Arts, and was opened on July 7, 2016 to replace the Adams Memorial Shakespearean Theatre. The Engelstad seats approximately 921 people, and features modern technology for its productions. Due to the outdoor nature of the theatre, productions are exclusively staged at night, and may be delayed due to rain and other inclement weather.

=== Eileen and Allen Anes Studio Theatre ===
The Eileen and Allen Anes Studio Theatre is an indoor black box style theatre with a capacity of approximately 200 people (depending on the configuration of the current productions). The "Anes" theatre, as it is commonly referred by, opened on July 30, 2016, as part of the Beverly Taylor Sorenson Center for the Arts.

== Leadership ==
David Ivers and Brian Vaughn were named co-artistic directors in 2011. Vaughn became the sole artistic director in 2017 when Ivers left the Festival to join the Arizona Theatre Company.

On October 3, 2022 the Festival announced the departure of Executive Director Frank Mack.

In 2023, Michael Bahr became the new Executive Managing Director of the festival. Bahr had been involved with the festival for decades, originally working in the festival's ticket office while he was a college student. Bahr later became the Education Director for the festival and served in that capacity for over twenty years before becoming Executing Managing Director. John DiAntonio was hired as the Artistic Director of the festival in 2023, having formerly worked as Artistic Director at the Creede Repertory Theatre in Colorado.

== Productions ==
The Utah Shakespeare Festival is a Repertory theatre, which produces a number of Shakespearean plays and other productions each season. The festival initially only performed works by Shakespeare, but expanded over time to include productions by other renowned playwrights, as well as contemporary playwrights.

=== Complete the Canon ===
The Utah Shakespeare Festival created a multi-year plan to stage each of William Shakespeare's 38 plays, which the festival refers to as "Complete the Canon". Complete the Canon began with their 2012 season and was scheduled to end with the 2023 season. Due to the Covid-19 pandemic and other factors, this schedule was delayed. The festival now intends to complete the canon with their 2027 season.

Notably, the festival also performed Shakespeare's ten history plays in chronological order, starting with King John in 2013 and ending with Henry VIII in 2024 as part of their bid to complete the canon.

Many of Shakespeare's popular plays were performed more than once during the Complete the Canon process.

=== List of productions at the festival ===
The table below contains a list of productions at the Utah Shakespeare Festival from their inaugural season to the upcoming season. This table was completed with information from the festival's official website.

† indicates a play performed as part of the festival's "Complete the Canon" endeavor.

Season	Play	Playwright(s)	Theater	Additional Info
2027	The Two Noble Kinsmen †	William Shakespeare	Eileen and Allen Anes Studio Theatre	Upcoming Final previously unperformed play to complete the canon.
2027	Henry V †	William Shakespeare	Engelstad Shakespeare Theatre	Upcoming
2027	The Merry Wives of Windsor †	William Shakespeare	Engelstad Shakespeare Theatre	Upcoming
2027	The Crucible	Arthur Miller	Engelstad Shakespeare Theatre	Upcoming
2027	The Drowsy Chaperone	Music and lyrics by Lisa Lambert and Greg Morrison	Randall L. Jones Theatre	Upcoming
2027	Arsenic and Old Lace	Joseph Kesselring	Randall L. Jones Theatre	Upcoming
2027	William Shakespeare's Land of the Dead	John Heimbuch	Randall L. Jones Theatre	Upcoming Shakespeare meets Zombies!
2027	Into the Breeches!	George Brant	Eileen and Allen Anes Studio Theatre	Upcoming
2027	All The Devils Are Here	Patrick Page	Eccles Music Center	Upcoming
2026	Hamlet †	William Shakespeare	Engelstad Shakespeare Theatre	
2026	Troilus and Cressida †	William Shakespeare	Engelstad Shakespeare Theatre	
2026	Twelfth Night †	William Shakespeare	Engelstad Shakespeare Theatre	
2026	The Book Club Play	Karen Zacarias	Eileen and Allen Anes Studio Theatre	
2026	Mary Shelley's Frankenstein	David Catlin	Eileen and Allen Anes Studio Theatre	Based on the novel Frankenstein by Mary Shelley.
2026	See How They Run	Philip King	Randall L. Jones Theatre	
2026	She Loves Me	Music by Jerry Bock; Lyrics by Sheldon Harnick	Randall L. Jones Theatre	Book by Joe Masteroff, Based on the Play by Miklós László
2026	Something Rotten!	Wayne Kirkpatrick, Karey Kirkpatrick	Randall L. Jones Theatre	
2025	Macbeth †	William Shakespeare	Engelstad Shakespeare Theatre	
2025	Antony and Cleopatra †	William Shakespeare	Engelstad Shakespeare Theatre	
2025	As You Like It †	William Shakespeare	Engelstad Shakespeare Theatre	
2025	A Gentleman's Guide to Love and Murder	Steven Lutvak, Robert L. Freedman	Randall L. Jones Theatre	Book and Lyrics by Robert L. Freedman, Music and Lyrics by Steven Lutvak, Based on the novel Israel Rank by Roy Horniman
2025	The Importance of Being Earnest	Oscar Wilde	Randall L. Jones Theatre	
2025	Steel Magnolias	Robert Harling	Randall L. Jones Theatre	
2025	Ken Ludwig’s Dear Jack, Dear Louise	Ken Ludwig	Eileen and Allen Anes Studio Theatre	
2024	Henry VIII †	William Shakespeare	Engelstad Shakespeare Theatre	
2024	The Winter's Tale †	William Shakespeare	Engelstad Shakespeare Theatre	
2024	The Taming of the Shrew †	William Shakespeare	Engelstad Shakespeare Theatre	
2024	Much Ado About Nothing †	William Shakespeare	Randall L. Jones Theatre	
2024	The 39 Steps	Patrick Barlow	Randall L. Jones Theatre	Adapted from the novel The 39 Steps by John Buchan
2024	Silent Sky	Lauren gunderson	Eileen and Allen Anes Studio Theatre	
2024	The Mountaintop	Katori Hall	Eileen and Allen Anes Studio Theatre	
2023	Romeo and Juliet †	William Shakespeare	Engelstad Shakespeare Theatre	
2023	A Midsummer Night's Dream †	William Shakespeare	Engelstad Shakespeare Theatre	
2023	Coriolanus †	William Shakespeare	Eileen and Allen Anes Studio Theatre	
2023	Timon of Athens †	William Shakespeare	Eileen and Allen Anes Studio Theatre	
2023	Jane Austen's Emma The Musical	Paul Gordon	Randall L. Jones Theatre	Based on the novel Emma by Jane Austen
2023	A Raisin in the Sun	Lorraine Hansberry	Randall L. Jones Theatre	
2023	The Play that Goes Wrong	Henry Lewis, Jonathan Sayer, Henry Shields	Randall L. Jones Theatre	
2022	All's Well That Ends Well †	William Shakespeare	Engelstad Shakespeare Theatre	
2022	King Lear †	William Shakespeare	Engelstad Shakespeare Theatre	
2022	The Tempest †	William Shakespeare	Eileen and Allen Anes Studio Theatre	
2022	Sweeney Todd: The Demon Barber of Fleet Street	Stephen Sondheim	Engelstad Shakespeare Theatre	The first non-Shakespeare related play staged in the Engelstad Theatre.
2022	Clue	Sandy Rustin	Randall L. Jones Theatre	
2022	The Sound of Music	Richard Rogers, Oscar Hammerstein II	Randall L. Jones Theatre	
2022	Trouble in Mind	Alice Childress	Randall L. Jones Theatre	
2022	Thurgood	George Stevens Jr.	Eileen and Allen Anes Studio Theatre	
2021	Pericles †	William Shakespeare	Engelstad Shakespeare Theatre	
2021	Richard III †	William Shakespeare	Engelstad Shakespeare Theatre	
2021	The Comedy of Errors †	William Shakespeare	Engelstad Shakespeare Theatre	
2021	Cymbeline †	William Shakespeare	Eileen and Allen Anes Studio Theatre	
2021	The Pirates of Penzance	W. S. Gilbert (libretto) & Arthur Sullivan (music)	Randall L. Jones Theatre	
2021	Ragtime	Book by Terrence McNally; music by Stephen Flaherty; lyrics by Lynn Ahrens	Randall L. Jones Theatre	
2021	Intimate Apparel	Lynn Nottage	Eileen and Allen Anes Studio Theatre	
2021	The Comedy of Terrors	John Goodrum	Randall L. Jones Theatre	A farce where two actors play all characters
2021	Gold Mountain	Jason Ma	West Valley Arts Center	This production was held in West Valley, UT, not in Cedar City with the rest of the festival.
2020	Season canceled because of COVID-19 pandemic	—	—	
2019	Macbeth †	William Shakespeare	Engelstad Shakespeare Theatre	
2019	Twelfth Night †	William Shakespeare	Engelstad Shakespeare Theatre	
2019	Hamlet †	William Shakespeare	Randall L. Jones Theatre	
2019	The Conclusion of Henry VI: Parts Two and Three	William Shakespeare	Eileen and Allen Anes Studio Theatre	
2019	The Book of Will	Lauren Gunderson	Engelstad Shakespeare Theatre	
2019	Joseph and the Amazing Technicolor Dreamcoat	Lyrics by Tim Rice; music by Andrew Lloyd Webber	Randall L. Jones Theatre	
2019	Every Brilliant Thing	Duncan Macmillan	Eileen and Allen Anes Studio Theatre	
2019	The Price	Arthur Miller	Randall L. Jones Theatre	
2018	The Merry Wives of Windsor †	William Shakespeare	Engelstad Shakespeare Theatre	
2018	The Merchant of Venice †	William Shakespeare	Engelstad Shakespeare Theatre	
2018	Henry VI Part One †	William Shakespeare	Engelstad Shakespeare Theatre	
2018	Othello †	William Shakespeare	Eileen and Allen Anes Studio Theatre	
2018	The Foreigner	Larry Shue	Randall L. Jones Theatre	
2018	Big River	Roger Miller	Randall L. Jones Theatre	
2018	An Iliad	Lisa Peterson & Denis O’Hare	Eileen and Allen Anes Studio Theatre	Performed as a one man play by Brian Vaughan. Based on Homer's Iliad
2018	The Liar	David Ives, adapted from Pierre Corneille	Randall L. Jones Theatre	
2017	As You Like It †	William Shakespeare	Engelstad Shakespeare Theatre	
2017	Romeo and Juliet †	William Shakespeare	Engelstad Shakespeare Theatre	
2017	A Midsummer Night’s Dream †	William Shakespeare	Randall L. Jones Theatre	
2017	Shakespeare in Love	Lee Hall	Engelstad Shakespeare Theatre	Adapted from the film screenplay by Marc Norman & Tom Stoppard
2017	Guys and Dolls	Music/lyrics by Frank Loesser; book by Jo Swerling & Abe Burrows	Randall L. Jones Theatre	
2017	Treasure Island	Mary Zimmerman	Randall L. Jones Theatre	Adapted from Robert Louis Stevenson's novel
2017	The Tavern	George M. Cohan	Randall L. Jones Theatre	Shakespeare Festival adaptation by Joseph Hanreddy
2017	How To Fight Loneliness	Neil LaBute	Eileen and Allen Anes Studio Theatre	
2017	William Shakespeare’s Long Lost First Play (abridged)	Reed Martin & Austin Tichenor	Eileen and Allen Anes Studio Theatre	A fast-paced comedic mashup based on and featuring Shakespeare's characters
2016	Much Ado about Nothing †	William Shakespeare	Engelstad Shakespeare Theatre	
2016	Henry V †	William Shakespeare	Engelstad Shakespeare Theatre	
2016	Julius Caesar †	William Shakespeare	Eileen and Allen Anes Studio Theatre	
2016	The Three Musketeers	Based on Alexandre Dumas; adaptation credit varies by production	Engelstad Shakespeare Theatre	
2016	The Cocoanuts	Irving Berlin	Randall L. Jones Theatre	
2016	The Odd Couple	Neil Simon	Randall L. Jones Theatre	
2016	Mary Poppins	Music/lyrics by Richard M. Sherman & Robert B. Sherman; additional music/lyrics by George Stiles & Anthony Drewe	Randall L. Jones Theatre	
2016	Murder for Two	Music by Joe Kinosian; lyrics by Kellen Blair	Eileen and Allen Anes Studio Theatre	
2015	Henry IV Part Two †	William Shakespeare	Adams Memorial Shakespearean Theatre	
2015	King Lear †	William Shakespeare	Adams Memorial Shakespearean Theatre	
2015	The Taming of the Shrew †	William Shakespeare	Adams Memorial Shakespearean Theatre	
2015	The Two Gentlemen of Verona †	William Shakespeare	Randall L. Jones Theatre	
2015	South Pacific	Richard Rogers, Oscar Hammerstein II	Randall L. Jones Theatre	
2015	Amadeus	Peter Shaffer	Randall L. Jones Theatre	
2015	Charley’s Aunt	Brandon Thomas	Randall L. Jones Theatre	
2015	Dracula	Steven Dietz	Randall L. Jones Theatre	Adapted from Bram Stoker's novel
2014	Henry IV Part One †	William Shakespeare	Adams Memorial Shakespearean Theatre	
2014	The Comedy of Errors †	William Shakespeare	Adams Memorial Shakespearean Theatre	
2014	Measure for Measure †	William Shakespeare	Adams Memorial Shakespearean Theatre	
2014	Twelfth Night †	William Shakespeare	Randall L. Jones Theatre	
2014	Into the Woods	Book by James Lapine; music & lyrics by Stephen Sondheim	Randall L. Jones Theatre	
2014	Sense and Sensibility	Joseph Hanreddy; J. R. Sullivan	Randall L. Jones Theatre	Adapted from Jane Austen's novel
2014	Boeing Boeing	Marc Camoletti	Randall L. Jones Theatre	
2014	Sherlock Holmes: The Final Adventure	Steven Dietz	Randall L. Jones Theatre	Based on Arthur Conan Doyle's character
2013	King John †	William Shakespeare	Adams Memorial Shakespearean Theatre	
2013	The Tempest †	William Shakespeare	Adams Memorial Shakespearean Theatre	
2013	Love’s Labour’s Lost †	William Shakespeare	Adams Memorial Shakespearean Theatre	
2013	Richard II †	William Shakespeare	Randall L. Jones Theatre	
2013	Peter and the Starcatcher	Rick Elice	Randall L. Jones Theatre	
2013	Anything Goes	Cole Porter	Randall L. Jones Theatre	Book by Guy Bolton, P. G. Wodehouse, Howard Lindsay & Russel Crouse
2013	Twelve Angry Men	Reginald Rose	Randall L. Jones Theatre	
2013	The Marvelous Wonderettes	Roger Bean	Randall L. Jones Theatre	
2012	The Merry Wives of Windsor †	William Shakespeare	Adams Memorial Shakespearean Theatre	
2012	Titus Andronicus †	William Shakespeare	Adams Memorial Shakespearean Theatre	
2012	Hamlet †	William Shakespeare	Randall L. Jones Theatre	
2012	Mary Stuart	Friedrich Schiller	Adams Memorial Shakespearean Theatre	
2012	Les Misérables	Music by Claude-Michel Schönberg; lyrics by Herbert Kretzmer	Randall L. Jones Theatre	Based on the novel Les Misérables by Victor Hugo
2012	Scapin	Molière	Randall L. Jones Theatre	
2012	To Kill a Mockingbird	Christopher Sergel	Randall L. Jones Theatre	Adapted from Harper Lee's novel To Kill a Mockingbird
2012	Stones in His Pockets	Marie Jones	Randall L. Jones Theatre	
2011	A Midsummer Night’s Dream	William Shakespeare	Adams Memorial Shakespearean Theatre	
2011	Richard III	William Shakespeare	Adams Memorial Shakespearean Theatre	
2011	Romeo and Juliet	William Shakespeare	Adams Memorial Shakespearean Theatre	
2011	The Winter’s Tale	William Shakespeare	Randall L. Jones Theatre	
2011	The Music Man	Meredith Willson	Randall L. Jones Theatre	
2011	The Glass Menagerie	Tennessee Williams	Randall L. Jones Theatre	
2011	Noises Off!	Michael Frayn	Randall L. Jones Theatre	
2011	Dial “M” for Murder	Frederick Knott	Randall L. Jones Theatre	
2010	Macbeth	William Shakespeare	Adams Memorial Shakespearean Theatre	
2010	The Merchant of Venice	William Shakespeare	Adams Memorial Shakespearean Theatre	
2010	Much Ado about Nothing	William Shakespeare	Adams Memorial Shakespearean Theatre	
2010	The Adventures of Pericles	William Shakespeare	Randall L. Jones Theatre	
2010	Alfred Hitchcock’s The 39 Steps	Patrick Barlow	Randall L. Jones Theatre	Based Alfred Hitchcock's film The 39 Steps
2010	Great Expectations, a New Musical	Music by Richard Winzeler; lyrics by Steve Lane	Randall L. Jones Theatre	
2010	Pride and Prejudice	Joseph Hanreddy; J. R. Sullivan	Randall L. Jones Theatre	Adapted from Jane Austen's novel Pride and Prejudice
2010	Greater Tuna	Joe Sears	Randall L. Jones Theatre	
2010	The Diary of Anne Frank	Frances Goodrich; Albert Hackett; later adaptation by Wendy Kesselman	Randall L. Jones Theatre	
2009	As You Like It	William Shakespeare	Adams Memorial Shakespearean Theatre	
2009	Henry V	William Shakespeare	Adams Memorial Shakespearean Theatre	
2009	The Comedy of Errors	William Shakespeare	Adams Memorial Shakespearean Theatre	
2009	Private Lives	Noël Coward	Randall L. Jones Theatre	
2009	The Secret Garden	Book/lyrics by Marsha Norman; music by Lucy Simon	Randall L. Jones Theatre	Based on Frances Hodgson Burnett's novel The Secret Garden
2009	Foxfire	Susan Cooper; Hume Cronyn	Randall L. Jones Theatre	
2009	The Complete Works of William Shakespeare (abridged)	Adam Long; Daniel Singer; Jess Winfield	Randall L. Jones Theatre	
2009	Tuesdays with Morrie	Jeffrey Hatcher & Mitch Albom	Randall L. Jones Theatre	Adapted from Mitch Albom's memoir Tuesdays with Morrie
2009	The Woman in Black	Stephen Mallatratt	Randall L. Jones Theatre	Adapted from Susan Hill's novel The Woman in Black
2008	Cyrano de Bergerac	Edmond Rostand	Adams Memorial Shakespearean Theatre	
2008	Othello	William Shakespeare	Adams Memorial Shakespearean Theatre	
2008	The Two Gentlemen of Verona	William Shakespeare	Adams Memorial Shakespearean Theatre	
2008	The Taming of the Shrew	William Shakespeare	Randall L. Jones Theatre	
2008	Julius Caesar	William Shakespeare	Randall L. Jones Theatre	
2008	The School for Wives	Molière	Randall L. Jones Theatre	
2008	Fiddler on the Roof	Music by Jerry Bock; lyrics by Sheldon Harnick	Randall L. Jones Theatre	
2008	Gaslight	Patrick Hamilton	Randall L. Jones Theatre	
2008	Moonlight and Magnolias	Ron Hutchinson	Randall L. Jones Theatre	
2007	Twelfth Night	William Shakespeare	Adams Memorial Shakespearean Theatre	
2007	Coriolanus	William Shakespeare	Adams Memorial Shakespearean Theatre	
2007	King Lear	William Shakespeare	Adams Memorial Shakespearean Theatre	
2007	The Tempest	William Shakespeare	Randall L. Jones Theatre	
2007	Lend Me a Tenor: the Musical	Book/lyrics by Peter Sham; music by Brad Carroll	Randall L. Jones Theatre	World Premiere Based on the play Lend Me a Tenor by Ken Ludwig
2007	Candida	George Bernard Shaw	Randall L. Jones Theatre	
2007	The Matchmaker	Thornton Wilder	Randall L. Jones Theatre	
2007	‘Art’	Yasmina Reza	Randall L. Jones Theatre	
2007	The Mousetrap	Agatha Christie	Randall L. Jones Theatre	
2006	Hamlet	William Shakespeare	Adams Memorial Shakespearean Theatre	
2006	The Merry Wives of Windsor	William Shakespeare	Adams Memorial Shakespearean Theatre	
2006	Antony and Cleopatra	William Shakespeare	Adams Memorial Shakespearean Theatre	
2006	The Merchant of Venice	William Shakespeare	Randall L. Jones Theatre	
2006	On Golden Pond	Ernest Thompson	Randall L. Jones Theatre	
2006	Room Service	John Murray; Allen Boretz	Randall L. Jones Theatre	
2006	H.M.S. Pinafore	W. S. Gilbert (libretto); Arthur Sullivan (music)	Randall L. Jones Theatre	
2006	Peg o’ My Heart	J. Hartley Manners	Randall L. Jones Theatre	
2006	Johnny Guitar	Music by Martin Silvestri; lyrics by Joel Higgins	Randall L. Jones Theatre	
2005	Doctor Faustus	Christopher Marlowe	Adams Memorial Shakespearean Theatre	
2005	Love’s Labour’s Lost	William Shakespeare	Adams Memorial Shakespearean Theatre	
2005	Romeo and Juliet	William Shakespeare	Adams Memorial Shakespearean Theatre	
2005	A Midsummer Night’s Dream	William Shakespeare	Randall L. Jones Theatre	
2005	All’s Well that Ends Well	William Shakespeare	Randall L. Jones Theatre	
2005	Camelot	Lyrics by Alan Jay Lerner; music by Frederick Loewe	Randall L. Jones Theatre	
2005	Stones in His Pockets	Marie Jones	Randall L. Jones Theatre	
2005	The Foreigner	Larry Shue	Randall L. Jones Theatre	
2005	Pippin	Stephen Schwartz	Randall L. Jones Theatre	
2004	Henry IV Part One	William Shakespeare	Adams Memorial Shakespearean Theatre	
2004	The Taming of the Shrew	William Shakespeare	Adams Memorial Shakespearean Theatre	
2004	The Winter’s Tale	William Shakespeare	Adams Memorial Shakespearean Theatre	
2004	Macbeth	William Shakespeare	Randall L. Jones Theatre	
2004	Morning’s at Seven	Paul Osborn	Randall L. Jones Theatre	
2004	My Fair Lady	Book/lyrics by Alan Jay Lerner; music by Frederick Loewe	Randall L. Jones Theatre	Based on George Bernard Shaw's play Pygmalion
2004	Forever Plaid	Stuart Ross	Randall L. Jones Theatre	
2004	Blithe Spirit	Noël Coward	Randall L. Jones Theatre	
2004	The Spitfire Grill	Music by James Valcq; lyrics by Fred Alley	Randall L. Jones Theatre	
2003	Measure for Measure	William Shakespeare	Adams Memorial Shakespearean Theatre	
2003	Much Ado about Nothing	William Shakespeare	Adams Memorial Shakespearean Theatre	
2003	Richard III	William Shakespeare	Adams Memorial Shakespearean Theatre	
2003	The Comedy of Errors	William Shakespeare	Randall L. Jones Theatre	
2003	1776	Book by Peter Stone; music & lyrics by Sherman Edwards	Randall L. Jones Theatre	
2003	Born Yesterday	Garson Kanin	Randall L. Jones Theatre	
2003	The Servant of Two Masters	Carlo Goldoni	Randall L. Jones Theatre	
2003	Little Shop of Horrors	Book/lyrics by Howard Ashman; music by Alan Menken	Randall L. Jones Theatre	
2003	The Importance of Being Earnest	Oscar Wilde	Randall L. Jones Theatre	
2002	As You Like It	William Shakespeare	Adams Memorial Shakespearean Theatre	
2002	Cymbeline	William Shakespeare	Adams Memorial Shakespearean Theatre	
2002	Othello	William Shakespeare	Adams Memorial Shakespearean Theatre	
2002	Twelfth Night	William Shakespeare	Randall L. Jones Theatre	
2002	Harvey	Mary Chase	Randall L. Jones Theatre	
2002	Hay Fever	Noël Coward	Randall L. Jones Theatre	
2002	Man of La Mancha	Book by Dale Wasserman; music by Mitch Leigh; lyrics by Joe Darion	Randall L. Jones Theatre	
2002	I Hate Hamlet	Paul Rudnick	Randall L. Jones Theatre	
2002	You’re a Good Man, Charlie Brown	Clark Gesner	Randall L. Jones Theatre	Based on the characters created by cartoonist Charles M. Schulz in his comic strip Peanuts
2001	Julius Caesar	William Shakespeare	Adams Memorial Shakespearean Theatre	
2001	The Tempest	William Shakespeare	Adams Memorial Shakespearean Theatre	
2001	The Two Gentlemen of Verona	William Shakespeare	Adams Memorial Shakespearean Theatre	
2001	Ah, Wilderness!	Eugene O’Neill	Randall L. Jones Theatre	
2001	Arsenic and Old Lace	Joseph Kesselring	Randall L. Jones Theatre	
2001	The Pirates of Penzance	W. S. Gilbert (libretto) & Arthur Sullivan (music)	Randall L. Jones Theatre	
2001	Around the World in 80 Days	Mark Brown	Randall L. Jones Theatre	Adapted from Jules Verne's novel Around the World in 80 Days
2001	The Fantasticks	Book/lyrics by Tom Jones; music by Harvey Schmidt	Randall L. Jones Theatre	
2000	The Merchant of Venice	William Shakespeare	Adams Memorial Shakespearean Theatre	
2000	The Merry Wives of Windsor	William Shakespeare	Adams Memorial Shakespearean Theatre	
2000	The War of the Roses		Adams Memorial Shakespearean Theatre	Adapted from William Shakespeare’s Henry VI plays and Richard III
2000	Noises Off!	Michael Frayn	Randall L. Jones Theatre	
2000	Peter Pan	Moose Charlap; Carolyn Leigh	Randall L. Jones Theatre	Based on the novel Peter Pan by J.M. Barrie
2000	The Cherry Orchard	Anton Chekhov	Randall L. Jones Theatre	
2000	Always . . . Patsy Cline	Ted Swindley	Randall L. Jones Theatre	
2000	Driving Miss Daisy	Alfred Uhry	Randall L. Jones Theatre	
1999	A Midsummer Night’s Dream	William Shakespeare	Adams Memorial Shakespearean Theatre	
1999	King Lear	William Shakespeare	Adams Memorial Shakespearean Theatre	
1999	Troilus and Cressida	William Shakespeare	Adams Memorial Shakespearean Theatre	
1999	Damn Yankees	Music/lyrics by Richard Adler & Jerry Ross	Randall L. Jones Theatre	
1999	The Lion in Winter	James Goldman	Randall L. Jones Theatre	
1999	You Never Can Tell	George Bernard Shaw	Randall L. Jones Theatre	
1999	Forever Plaid	Stuart Ross	Randall L. Jones Theatre	
1999	The Complete Works of William Shakespeare (Abridged)	Adam Long; Daniel Singer; Jess Winfield	Randall L. Jones Theatre	
1998	All’s Well that Ends Well	William Shakespeare	Adams Memorial Shakespearean Theatre	
1998	King John	William Shakespeare	Adams Memorial Shakespearean Theatre	
1998	The Taming of the Shrew	William Shakespeare	Adams Memorial Shakespearean Theatre	
1998	Joseph and the Amazing Technicolor Dreamcoat	Lyrics by Tim Rice; music by Andrew Lloyd Webber	Randall L. Jones Theatre	
1998	Relative Values	Noël Coward	Randall L. Jones Theatre	
1998	Romeo and Juliet	William Shakespeare	Randall L. Jones Theatre	
1997	Henry V	William Shakespeare	Adams Memorial Shakespearean Theatre	
1997	Pericles	William Shakespeare	Adams Memorial Shakespearean Theatre	
1997	Twelfth Night	William Shakespeare	Adams Memorial Shakespearean Theatre	
1997	Charley’s Aunt	Brandon Thomas	Randall L. Jones Theatre	
1997	Hamlet	William Shakespeare	Randall L. Jones Theatre	
1997	The Boy Friend	Sandy Wilson	Randall L. Jones Theatre	
1996	Henry IV Part One	William Shakespeare	Adams Memorial Shakespearean Theatre	
1996	Macbeth	William Shakespeare	Adams Memorial Shakespearean Theatre	
1996	The Comedy of Errors	William Shakespeare	Adams Memorial Shakespearean Theatre	
1996	The Mikado	W. S. Gilbert (libretto) & Arthur Sullivan (music)	Randall L. Jones Theatre	
1996	The Three Musketeers		Randall L. Jones Theatre	Adaptation from Alexandre Dumas' novel The Three Musketeers
1996	The Winter’s Tale	William Shakespeare	Randall L. Jones Theatre	
1995	Henry VIII	William Shakespeare	Adams Memorial Shakespearean Theatre	
1995	Much Ado about Nothing	William Shakespeare	Adams Memorial Shakespearean Theatre	
1995	Othello	William Shakespeare	Adams Memorial Shakespearean Theatre	
1995	A Funny Thing Happened on the Way to the Forum	Stephen Sondheim	Randall L. Jones Theatre	
1995	The Tempest	William Shakespeare	Randall L. Jones Theatre	
1995	You Can’t Take It with You	George S. Kaufman; Moss Hart	Randall L. Jones Theatre	
1994	As You Like It	William Shakespeare	Adams Memorial Shakespearean Theatre	
1994	The Shoemaker’s Holiday	Thomas Dekker	Adams Memorial Shakespearean Theatre	
1994	Richard III	William Shakespeare	Adams Memorial Shakespearean Theatre	
1994	A Flea in Her Ear	Georges Feydeau	Randall L. Jones Theatre	
1994	A Streetcar Named Desire	Tennessee Williams	Randall L. Jones Theatre	
1994	Love’s Labour’s Lost	William Shakespeare	Randall L. Jones Theatre	
1993	A Midsummer Night’s Dream	William Shakespeare	Adams Memorial Shakespearean Theatre	
1993	Richard II	William Shakespeare	Adams Memorial Shakespearean Theatre	
1993	Timon of Athens	William Shakespeare	Adams Memorial Shakespearean Theatre	
1993	Our Town	Thornton Wilder	Randall L. Jones Theatre	
1993	Tartuffe	Molière	Randall L. Jones Theatre	
1993	The Royal Family	George S. Kaufman; Edna Ferber	Randall L. Jones Theatre	
1992	King Lear	William Shakespeare	Adams Memorial Shakespearean Theatre	
1992	The Merchant of Venice	William Shakespeare	Adams Memorial Shakespearean Theatre	
1992	The Merry Wives of Windsor	William Shakespeare	Adams Memorial Shakespearean Theatre	
1992	Blithe Spirit	Noël Coward	Randall L. Jones Theatre	
1992	Cyrano de Bergerac	Edmond Rostand	Randall L. Jones Theatre	
1992	Julius Caesar	William Shakespeare	Randall L. Jones Theatre	
1991	Hamlet	William Shakespeare	Adams Memorial Shakespearean Theatre	
1991	Twelfth Night	William Shakespeare	Adams Memorial Shakespearean Theatre	
1991	Volpone	Ben Jonson	Adams Memorial Shakespearean Theatre	
1991	Death of a Salesman	Arthur Miller	Randall L. Jones Theatre	
1991	Misalliance	George Bernard Shaw	Randall L. Jones Theatre	
1991	The Taming of the Shrew	William Shakespeare	Randall L. Jones Theatre	
1990	Romeo and Juliet	William Shakespeare	Adams Memorial Shakespearean Theatre	
1990	Titus Andronicus	William Shakespeare	Adams Memorial Shakespearean Theatre	
1990	The Two Gentlemen of Verona	William Shakespeare	Adams Memorial Shakespearean Theatre	
1990	Ghosts	Henrik Ibsen	Randall L. Jones Theatre	
1990	Waiting for Godot	Samuel Beckett	Randall L. Jones Theatre	
1990	The Importance of Being Earnest	Oscar Wilde	Randall L. Jones Theatre	
1989	The Tempest	William Shakespeare	Adams Memorial Shakespearean Theatre	
1989	Macbeth	William Shakespeare	Adams Memorial Shakespearean Theatre	
1989	The Winter’s Tale	William Shakespeare	Adams Memorial Shakespearean Theatre	
1989	The Glass Menagerie	Tennessee Williams	Randall L. Jones Theatre	
1989	The Imaginary Invalid	Molière	Randall L. Jones Theatre	
1989	Nothing Like the Sun	Writing/adaptation credit not verified in accessible online archive	Randall L. Jones Theatre	
1988	As You Like It	William Shakespeare	Adams Memorial Shakespearean Theatre	
1988	Othello	William Shakespeare	Adams Memorial Shakespearean Theatre	
1988	Cymbeline	William Shakespeare	Adams Memorial Shakespearean Theatre	
1987	The Comedy of Errors	William Shakespeare	Adams Memorial Shakespearean Theatre	
1987	Richard III	William Shakespeare	Adams Memorial Shakespearean Theatre	
1987	Much Ado about Nothing	William Shakespeare	Adams Memorial Shakespearean Theatre	
1986	A Midsummer Night’s Dream	William Shakespeare	Adams Memorial Shakespearean Theatre	
1986	Julius Caesar	William Shakespeare	Adams Memorial Shakespearean Theatre	
1986	Love’s Labour’s Lost	William Shakespeare	Adams Memorial Shakespearean Theatre	
1985	Antony and Cleopatra	William Shakespeare	Adams Memorial Shakespearean Theatre	
1985	Twelfth Night	William Shakespeare	Adams Memorial Shakespearean Theatre	
1985	The Merry Wives of Windsor	William Shakespeare	Adams Memorial Shakespearean Theatre	
1984	The Taming of the Shrew	William Shakespeare	Adams Memorial Shakespearean Theatre	
1984	The Tempest	William Shakespeare	Adams Memorial Shakespearean Theatre	
1984	Troilus and Cressida	William Shakespeare	Adams Memorial Shakespearean Theatre	
1983	Henry V	William Shakespeare	Adams Memorial Shakespearean Theatre	
1983	The Two Gentlemen of Verona	William Shakespeare	Adams Memorial Shakespearean Theatre	
1983	The Merchant of Venice	William Shakespeare	Adams Memorial Shakespearean Theatre	
1982	As You Like It	William Shakespeare	Adams Memorial Shakespearean Theatre	
1982	Romeo and Juliet	William Shakespeare	Adams Memorial Shakespearean Theatre	
1982	Henry IV Part Two	William Shakespeare	Adams Memorial Shakespearean Theatre	
1981	Much Ado about Nothing	William Shakespeare	Adams Memorial Shakespearean Theatre	
1981	Hamlet	William Shakespeare	Adams Memorial Shakespearean Theatre	
1981	Henry IV Part One	William Shakespeare	Adams Memorial Shakespearean Theatre	
1981	The Guardsman	Ferenc Molnár	Adams Memorial Shakespearean Theatre	
1980	The Comedy of Errors	William Shakespeare	Adams Memorial Shakespearean Theatre	
1980	Macbeth	William Shakespeare	Adams Memorial Shakespearean Theatre	
1980	Measure for Measure	William Shakespeare	Adams Memorial Shakespearean Theatre	
1979	The Merry Wives of Windsor	William Shakespeare	Adams Memorial Shakespearean Theatre	
1979	King Lear	William Shakespeare	Adams Memorial Shakespearean Theatre	
1979	All’s Well that Ends Well	William Shakespeare	Adams Memorial Shakespearean Theatre	
1978	Twelfth Night	William Shakespeare	Adams Memorial Shakespearean Theatre	
1978	Othello	William Shakespeare	Adams Memorial Shakespearean Theatre	
1978	A Midsummer Night’s Dream	William Shakespeare	Adams Memorial Shakespearean Theatre	
1978	Scandals	Writing credit not verified in accessible online archive	Adams Memorial Shakespearean Theatre	
1977	The Taming of the Shrew	William Shakespeare	Adams Memorial Shakespearean Theatre	
1977	Coriolanus	William Shakespeare	Adams Memorial Shakespearean Theatre	
1977	Romeo and Juliet	William Shakespeare	Adams Memorial Shakespearean Theatre	
1977	The Mikado	W. S. Gilbert (libretto) & Arthur Sullivan (music)	Adams Memorial Shakespearean Theatre	
1976	The Tempest	William Shakespeare	Original outdoor Festival stage, Southern Utah State College campus	
1976	Love’s Labour’s Lost	William Shakespeare	Original outdoor Festival stage, Southern Utah State College campus	
1976	Julius Caesar	William Shakespeare	Original outdoor Festival stage, Southern Utah State College campus	
1975	The Merchant of Venice	William Shakespeare	Original outdoor Festival stage, Southern Utah State College campus	
1975	Richard II	William Shakespeare	Original outdoor Festival stage, Southern Utah State College campus	
1975	The Two Gentlemen of Verona	William Shakespeare	Original outdoor Festival stage, Southern Utah State College campus	
1974	As You Like It	William Shakespeare	Original outdoor Festival stage, Southern Utah State College campus	
1974	Hamlet	William Shakespeare	Original outdoor Festival stage, Southern Utah State College campus	
1974	Henry VIII	William Shakespeare	Original outdoor Festival stage, Southern Utah State College campus	
1973	A Midsummer Night’s Dream	William Shakespeare	Original outdoor Festival stage, Southern Utah State College campus	
1973	Macbeth	William Shakespeare	Original outdoor Festival stage, Southern Utah State College campus	
1973	Much Ado about Nothing	William Shakespeare	Original outdoor Festival stage, Southern Utah State College campus	
1972	The Comedy of Errors	William Shakespeare	Original outdoor Festival stage, Southern Utah State College campus	
1972	King Lear	William Shakespeare	Original outdoor Festival stage, Southern Utah State College campus	
1972	The Winter’s Tale	William Shakespeare	Original outdoor Festival stage, Southern Utah State College campus	
1971	The Taming of the Shrew	William Shakespeare	Original outdoor Festival stage, Southern Utah State College campus	
1971	Henry IV Part One	William Shakespeare	Original outdoor Festival stage, Southern Utah State College campus	
1971	The Tempest	William Shakespeare	Original outdoor Festival stage, Southern Utah State College campus	
1970	Richard III	William Shakespeare	Original outdoor Festival stage, Southern Utah State College campus	
1970	The Merry Wives of Windsor	William Shakespeare	Original outdoor Festival stage, Southern Utah State College campus	
1970	Twelfth Night	William Shakespeare	Original outdoor Festival stage, Southern Utah State College campus	
1969	A Midsummer Night’s Dream	William Shakespeare	Original outdoor Festival stage, Southern Utah State College campus	
1969	Othello	William Shakespeare	Original outdoor Festival stage, Southern Utah State College campus	
1969	Love’s Labour’s Lost	William Shakespeare	Original outdoor Festival stage, Southern Utah State College campus	
1968	The Merchant of Venice	William Shakespeare	Original outdoor Festival stage, Southern Utah State College campus	
1968	As You Like It	William Shakespeare	Original outdoor Festival stage, Southern Utah State College campus	
1968	Romeo and Juliet	William Shakespeare	Original outdoor Festival stage, Southern Utah State College campus	
1967	The Comedy of Errors	William Shakespeare	Original outdoor Festival stage, Southern Utah State College campus	
1967	Hamlet	William Shakespeare	Original outdoor Festival stage, Southern Utah State College campus	
1967	The Tempest	William Shakespeare	Original outdoor Festival stage, Southern Utah State College campus	
1966	The Taming of the Shrew	William Shakespeare	Original outdoor Festival stage, Southern Utah State College campus	
1966	Julius Caesar	William Shakespeare	Original outdoor Festival stage, Southern Utah State College campus	
1966	The Two Gentlemen of Verona	William Shakespeare	Original outdoor Festival stage, Southern Utah State College campus	
1965	The Merry Wives of Windsor	William Shakespeare	Original outdoor Festival stage, Southern Utah State College campus	
1965	Much Ado about Nothing	William Shakespeare	Original outdoor Festival stage, Southern Utah State College campus	
1965	King Lear	William Shakespeare	Original outdoor Festival stage, Southern Utah State College campus	
1964	Twelfth Night	William Shakespeare	Original outdoor Festival stage, Southern Utah State College campus	
1964	Macbeth	William Shakespeare	Original outdoor Festival stage, Southern Utah State College campus	
1964	A Midsummer Night’s Dream	William Shakespeare	Original outdoor Festival stage, Southern Utah State College campus	
1963	Othello	William Shakespeare	Original outdoor Festival stage, Southern Utah State College campus	
1963	As You Like It	William Shakespeare	Original outdoor Festival stage, Southern Utah State College campus	
1963	Antony and Cleopatra	William Shakespeare	Original outdoor Festival stage, Southern Utah State College campus	
1962	The Taming of the Shrew	William Shakespeare	Original outdoor Festival stage, Southern Utah State College campus	
1962	Hamlet	William Shakespeare	Original outdoor Festival stage, Southern Utah State College campus	
1962	The Merchant of Venice	William Shakespeare	Original outdoor Festival stage, Southern Utah State College campus	
1961	The Taming of the Shrew	William Shakespeare		Student production directed by festival founder Fred Adams. Cited as a test run for the festival.

== See also ==
- Wooden O Symposium
