= John Alvin =

American cinematic artist and painter (1948–2008)

- Born: John Henry Alvin; November 24, 1948; Hyannis, Massachusetts, U.S.
- Died: February 6, 2008 (aged 59); Rhinebeck, New York, U.S.
- Occupations: Cinematic artist and painter
- Spouse: Andrea Alvin (19??–2008; his death)
- Children: Farah Alvin

John Henry Alvin (November 24, 1948 – February 6, 2008) was an American cinematic artist and painter who illustrated many movie posters. Alvin created posters and key art for more than 135 films, beginning with the poster for Mel Brooks's Blazing Saddles (1974). His style of art became known as Alvinesque by friends and colleagues in the entertainment industry.

Alvin's work includes the movie posters for E.T. the Extra-Terrestrial, Blade Runner, Gremlins, Spies Like Us, The Color Purple, The Little Mermaid, Batman Returns, Beauty and the Beast, Aladdin, The Lion King, Space Jam, The Emperor's New Groove, Harry Potter and the Philosopher's Stone, and Looney Tunes: Back in Action. He also created the anniversary posters for Star Wars.

== Early life and education ==
John Henry Alvin was born on November 24, 1948, in Hyannis, Massachusetts. His parents were in the United States military and the family was relocated often.

The Alvins settled permanently in the area of Monterey, California, where Alvin graduated from Pacific Grove High School in 1966.

His early interest in movie posters reportedly began with movie advertisements in the Sunday newspaper.

Alvin graduated from the Art Center College of Design in Los Angeles in 1971 and began work as a freelance artist.

He lived in the Linda Mar area of Pacifica, California, from 1958 to 1961, then moved to Monterey, California on January 1, 1961.

== Career ==
Alvin's first official movie art campaign was the poster for Blazing Saddles, directed by Mel Brooks, in 1974. Alvin, who was working as an animator at an animation studio at the time, was invited to work on the Blazing Saddles poster by a friend.

Alvin took an unusual path when designing the movie poster. He designed a serious movie poster, which incorporated unusual and quirky elements from the film. For example, in the poster, Alvin depicts Mel Brooks, who plays a Yiddish-speaking Native American chief in the film, wearing a headdress inscribed with the phrase, Kosher for Passover. The joke had been suggested by Alvin's wife, Andrea.

Alvin's work on Blazing Saddles was liked by Mel Brooks, as well as by others in the industry. He went on to work on a number of Brooks' later films, including Young Frankenstein, which was also released in 1974.

Alvin also did the poster for Steven Spielberg's 1982 film, E.T. the Extra-Terrestrial. It shows E.T.'s finger touching the finger of his human friend, Elliott, fingertip to fingertip. The fingers create a glow where they touch. The idea for the poster was reportedly suggested by Spielberg, and was inspired by Michelangelo's painting, The Creation of Adam. Alvin used his daughter as the human hand model for the poster.

Alvin created artwork for more than 135 film campaigns over the span of three decades. His work for such film studios as New Line Cinema, Warner Bros., Disney Studios and Lucasfilm, include Blade Runner, Cocoon, The Lost Boys, Predator, The Princess Bride, Gremlins, The Goonies, The Lion King, Beauty and the Beast, Batman Returns, Batman Forever, Jurassic Park, and Space Jam. He also created the anniversary posters and other artwork for the 30th-anniversary Star Wars Celebration.

John Alvin created the artwork for the 1995 international VHS and Laserdisc release of the Star Wars Trilogy.

In later years, he created posters for Peter Jackson's Lord of the Rings trilogy, the Harry Potter film series and Walt Disney's Pirates of the Caribbean films. According to John Sabel, an advertising executive at Walt Disney Pictures who often worked with Alvin, "There was a reason why The Lion King did the numbers that it did... There was a reason why 'Hunchback [of Notre Dame]' became a big success. It's because of the images that were produced, and a lot of those were John Alvin's paintings."

Alvin's poster for the 1974 film Phantom of the Paradise was selected by the National Collection of Fine Arts at the Smithsonian Institution and the Museum of Modern Art to be included in "Images of an Era (1945–1975)", a collection of posters that toured Europe as part of the U.S. Bicentennial.

In later years, Alvin focused more on cinematic fine art as the importance of movie posters was usurped by newer forms of digital advertising. Alvin's fine art portfolio centered on movies artistically, rather than on advertising.

The Art of John Alvin, a book collecting a large portfolio of his work by Andrea Alvin, was published on August 26, 2014, by Titan Books.

The book includes examples of publicly used artwork, as well as previously unseen paintings and sketches, with a foreword by Jeffrey Katzenberg and commentary by Alvin's widow.

ArtInsights, exclusively retail Alvin's original works to the public.

== Personal life ==
Alvin met his wife Andrea at the Art Center College of Design in Los Angeles, where they were both students. Andrea went on to become an accomplished painter. They had one child, actress Farah Alvin. Their daughter's hand was featured on the movie poster for E.T. the Extra-Terrestrial.

== Death ==
On February 6, 2008, Alvin died at his home in Rhinebeck, New York from a heart attack.

== Filmography ==
- Anchor Bay Entertainment
  - Tai-Pan (1986)
- Artisan Entertainment
  - The Fabulous Baker Boys (1989)
- Buena Vista Home Entertainment
  - Blaze (1989)
  - Mr. Destiny (1990)
  - Oscar (1991)
  - Deceived (1991)
  - Ernest Scared Stupid (1991)
  - Sarafina! (1992)
  - My Boyfriend's Back (1993)
  - The Nightmare Before Christmas (1993)
  - Judge Dredd (1995)
- Columbia TriStar
  - Bite the Bullet (1975)
  - Bobby Deerfield (1977)
  - Hanover Street (1979)
  - Wholly Moses! (1980)
  - White Nights (1985)
  - A Chorus Line (1985)
  - The Blob (1988)
  - Lawrence of Arabia (1989 re-release)
  - Chances Are (1989)
  - Blind Fury (1989)
  - Old Gringo (1989)
  - The Freshman (1990)
  - Flatliners (1990)
  - Jacob's Ladder (1990)
  - By the Sword (1991)
  - Hook (1991)
  - Radio Flyer (1992)
  - Sleepwalkers (1992)
  - Year of the Comet (1992)
  - Wilder Napalm (1993)
  - City Slickers II: The Legend of Curly's Gold (1994)
  - Little Big League (1994)
  - The Shawshank Redemption (1994)
- Walt Disney Studios Motion Pictures
  - Escape to Witch Mountain (1975)
  - Tron (1982)
  - The Sword in the Stone (1983 re-release)
  - Lady and the Tramp (1986 re-release)
  - Cinderella (1987 re-release)
  - The Aristocats (1987 re-release)
  - Bambi (1988 re-release)
  - The Fox and the Hound (1988 re-release)
  - The Rescuers (1989 re-release)
  - Peter Pan (1989 re-release)
  - Arachnophobia (1990)
  - Shipwrecked (1990)
  - The Jungle Book (1990 re-release)
  - The Rescuers Down Under (1990)
  - The Rocketeer (1991)
  - Beauty and the Beast (1991)
  - Pinocchio (1992 re-release)
  - Aladdin (1992)
  - Newsies (1992)
  - The Adventures of Huck Finn (1993)
  - The Three Musketeers (1993)
  - Snow White and the Seven Dwarfs (1993 re-release)
  - Iron Will (1994)
  - The Lion King (1994)
  - Rudyard Kipling's The Jungle Book (1994)
  - Tall Tale (1995)
  - A Goofy Movie (1995)
  - Oliver & Company (1996 re-release)
  - The Hunchback of Notre Dame (1996)
  - Hercules (1997)
  - The Little Mermaid (1997 re-release)
  - Mulan (1998)
  - Tarzan (1999)
  - Fantasia 2000 (1999)
  - Dinosaur (2000)
  - The Emperor's New Groove (2000)
  - Atlantis: The Lost Empire (2001)
  - Chicken Little (2005)
  - The Chronicles of Narnia: The Lion, the Witch and the Wardrobe (2005)
  - Enchanted (2007)
- Fox Home Entertainment
  - Mother, Jugs & Speed (1976)
  - The Verdict (1982)
  - Raw Deal (1986)
  - Dying Young (1991)
  - Thumbelina (1994)
  - A Troll in Central Park (1994)
  - The Pebble and the Penguin (1995)
- Image Entertainment
  - Twilight Zone: The Movie (1983)
  - Short Circuit (1986)
- MGM
  - Rancho Deluxe (1975)
  - From Noon till Three (1976)
  - Motel Hell (1980)
  - Poltergeist (1982)
  - The Secret of NIMH (1982)
  - Victor/Victoria (1982)
  - My Favorite Year (1982)
  - The Plague Dogs (1982)
  - Trail of the Pink Panther (1982)
  - Losin' It (1983)
  - Curse of the Pink Panther (1983)
  - Red Dawn (1984)
  - That's Dancing! (1985)
  - Poltergeist II: The Other Side (1986)
  - Running Scared (1986)
  - Solarbabies (1986)
  - Spaceballs (1987)
  - The Princess Bride (1987)
  - Betrayed (1988)
  - Rain Man (1988)
  - Leviathan (1989)
  - All Dogs Go to Heaven (1989)
  - Texasville (1990)
  - City Slickers (1991)
  - Fluke (1995)
  - All Dogs Go to Heaven 2 (1996)
- Paramount Pictures
  - Won Ton Ton, the Dog Who Saved Hollywood (1976)
  - Sorcerer (1977)
  - Raiders of the Lost Ark (1981)
  - Indiana Jones and the Temple of Doom (1984)
  - The Golden Child (1986)
  - Ferris Bueller's Day Off (1986)
  - We're No Angels (1989)
  - The Godfather Part III (1990)
  - Flight of the Intruder (1991)
  - Talent for the Game (1991)
  - Soapdish (1991)
  - Regarding Henry (1991)
  - The Butcher's Wife (1991)
  - The Addams Family (1991)
  - Star Trek VI: The Undiscovered Country (1991)
  - Patriot Games (1992)
  - Cool World (1992)
  - 1492: Conquest of Paradise (1992)
  - Leap of Faith (1992)
  - The Core (2003)
  - The SpongeBob SquarePants Movie (2004)
  - War of the Worlds (2005)
- Twentieth Century Fox
  - Planet of the Apes (1968)
  - Conrack (1974)
  - The Crazy World of Julius Vrooder (1974)
  - Phantom of the Paradise (1974)
  - Young Frankenstein (1974)
  - Lucky Lady (1975)
  - Star Wars: The Concerts
  - Silent Movie (1976)
  - The Last Hard Men (1976)
  - The Turning Point (1977)
  - High Anxiety (1977)
  - History of the World, Part I (1981)
  - The Pirate Movie (1982)
  - Rhinestone (1984)
  - Cocoon (1985)
  - The Manhattan Project (1986)
  - Star Wars (10th anniversary) (1987)
  - Project X (1987)
  - The Sicilian (1987)
  - Willow (1988)
  - Cocoon: The Return (1988)
  - Gleaming the Cube (1989)
  - Skin Deep (1989)
  - Enemies, A Love Story (1989)
  - Come See the Paradise (1990)
  - Buffy the Vampire Slayer (1992)
  - Toys (1992)
  - Alien (15th anniversary) (1994 re-release)
  - Anastasia (1997)
  - Titan A.E. (2000)
  - Planet of the Apes (2001)
- Universal Music Group
  - Melvin and Howard (1980)
  - Legend (1985)
- Universal Pictures
  - Sorcerer (1977)
  - The Wiz (1978)
  - Smokey and the Bandit II (1980)
  - Flash Gordon (1980)
  - Missing (1982)
  - E.T. the Extra-Terrestrial (1982)
  - The Dark Crystal (1982)
  - Scarface (1983)
  - The River (1984)
  - An American Tail (1986)
  - Harry and the Hendersons (1987)
  - The Milagro Beanfield War (1988)
  - The Last Temptation of Christ (1988)
  - The Land Before Time (1988)
  - Renegades (1989)
  - Always (1989)
  - Lionheart (1990)
  - Darkman (1990)
  - Havana (1990)
  - Once Around (1991)
  - Cape Fear (1991)
  - The Babe (1992)
  - Leaving Normal (1992)
  - Far and Away (1992)
  - Scent of a Woman (1992)
  - Jurassic Park (1993)
  - Heart and Souls (1993)
  - We're Back! A Dinosaur's Story (1993)
  - Greedy (1994)
  - Waterworld (1995)
  - Balto (1995)
  - Dragonheart (1996)
- Vestron Video
  - The Adventures of Buckaroo Banzai Across the 8th Dimension (1984)
  - Ironweed (1987)
- Warner Bros.
  - Blazing Saddles (1974)
  - Our Time (1974)
  - Big Wednesday (1978)
  - 10 (1979)
  - The Frisco Kid (1979)
  - Excalibur (1981)
  - Outland (1981)
  - S.O.B. (1981)
  - So Fine (1981)
  - Blade Runner (1982)
  - The World According to Garp (1982)
  - The Outsiders (1983)
  - Deal of the Century (1983)
  - Gremlins (1984)
  - Pee-wee's Big Adventure (1985)
  - Spies Like Us (1985)
  - The Goonies (1985)
  - The Color Purple (1985)
  - Cobra (1986)
  - One Crazy Summer (1986)
  - The Mosquito Coast (1986)
  - The Lost Boys (1987)
  - Innerspace (1987)
  - Empire of the Sun (1987)
  - Beetlejuice (1988)
  - Batman (1989)
  - Joe Versus the Volcano (1990)
  - The Nutcracker Prince (1990)
  - New Jack City (1991)
  - Nothing but Trouble (1991)
  - Robin Hood: Prince of Thieves (1991)
  - Doc Hollywood (1991)
  - Showdown in Little Tokyo (1991)
  - Meeting Venus (1991)
  - JFK (1991)
  - Batman Returns (1992)
  - Stay Tuned (1992)
  - Christopher Columbus: The Discovery (1992)
  - Innocent Blood (1992)
  - Under Siege (1992)
  - Made in America (1993)
  - Dennis the Menace (1993)
  - The Man Without a Face (1993)
  - The Saint of Fort Washington (1993)
  - Ace Ventura: Pet Detective (1994)
  - The Mask (1994)
  - Disclosure (1994)
  - Ace Ventura: When Nature Calls (1995)
  - Batman Forever (1995)
  - Bad Moon (1996)
  - Space Jam (1996)
  - Mars Attacks! (1996)
  - Cats Don't Dance (1997)
  - Batman & Robin (1997)
  - The Fearless Four (1997)
  - Quest for Camelot (1998)
  - The Iron Giant (1999)
  - The Green Mile (1999)
  - Harry Potter and the Philosopher's Stone (2001)
  - The Majestic (2001)
  - Looney Tunes: Back in Action (2003)
  - Harry Potter and the Goblet of Fire (2005)
- Other:
  - The Nickel Ride (1974)
  - Royal Flash (1975)
  - The Adventure of Sherlock Holmes' Smarter Brother (1975)
  - Smile (1975)
  - Serial (1980)
  - Fanny and Alexander (1982)
  - Eddie and the Cruisers (1983)
  - Black Moon Rising (1986)
  - King Kong Lives (1986)
  - Return of the Living Dead Part II (1988)
  - Lisa (1989)
  - Tom and Jerry: The Movie (1992)
  - Felidae (1994)
  - North (1994)
  - Mouse Hunt (1997)
  - Pokémon: The First Movie (1998)
  - Pokémon the Movie 2000 (1999)
