= Farah Alvin =

American theatre actress

- Born: September 28, 1976 (age 49); Los Angeles, California, U.S.
- Education: Brooklyn College Conservatory of Music
- Occupation: Theatre actress
- Known for: The Marvelous Wonderettes, One Night with Fanny Brice, Grease, Nine
- Parent(s): John Alvin (father); Andrea Alvin (mother)
- Awards: Drama Desk Award nominee (2009)

Farah Alvin (born September 28, 1976) is an American theatre actress. She is the daughter of cinematic poster artist John Alvin.

== Early life ==
Alvin grew up in Los Angeles, the daughter of the artists John Alvin and Andrea Alvin. In 1993, at the age of sixteen, she won the Spotlights Award, a scholarship competition for the Los Angeles Music Center and performed at the Dorothy Chandler Pavilion. At eighteen, she received a scholarship to the Brooklyn College music conservatory and moved to New York City.

== Career ==
During her senior year of high school, Alvin earned her Equity card when she performed in the Los Angeles premiere of Fame: The Musical. Three weeks after moving to New York, she obtained a role in the musical A Christmas Carol at Madison Square Garden. Alvin's first Broadway theatre credit came was in the revival of the musical Grease. Subsequent Broadway credits have included the musical productions of Saturday Night Fever, Nine and The Look of Love. Alvin appeared as Marcy in an Off Broadway production of the musical I Love You Because, as well as several other Off Broadway productions.

In 2009, Alvin was nominated for a Drama Desk Award for Outstanding Featured Actress in a Musical, for her role as Missy in The Marvelous Wonderettes. In 2011, she performed the title role of the Off Broadway musical One Night with Fanny Brice.
