= Life Could Be a Dream (musical) =

- Music: Various
- Lyrics: Various
- Book: Roger Bean
- Basis: Songs of the 1960s
- Premiere: April 7, 2009: The Hudson Theatre
- Productions: 2009 Hollywood

Life Could Be a Dream is a jukebox musical written by Roger Bean, the creator of The Marvelous Wonderettes.

The original production at the Hudson Theatre in Hollywood, California was directed by Bean and was produced by David Elzer. It premiered on August 7, 2009, and starred Daniel Tatar, Jim Holdridge, Ryan Castellino, Doug Carpenter and Jessica Keenan Wynn.

== Synopsis ==
=== Act 1 ===
Denny Varney and Eugene Johnson are rehearsing for the "Dream of a Lifetime" Talent Search ("Life Could Be a Dream (Sh-Boom)"), hosted by Big Whopper Radio. Denny, a former member of the Crooning Crab Cakes glee club at Springfield High School, grabs the spotlight as Eugene struggles to keep up with him. They rehearse in Denny's basement, and it becomes clear when their friend Wally arrives that Denny's mother is ready for him to grow up and move out ("Get a Job"). Wally Patton joins the singing group and suggests they ask if Big Stuff Auto will sponsor them in the contest. Denny's mother, Mrs. Varney, tells the boys to keep the noise down, but no one can stifle these boys and their musical ambitions ("Mama Don't Allow It"). The next night the boys are anxiously awaiting their audition for "Big" Earl, the owner of Big Stuff Auto, when mechanic Duke Henderson shows up instead. Trouble comes in the form of Lois Franklin, "Big" Earl's daughter, who shows up to help Duke evaluate the group, but who also broke Eugene's heart many years before. Eugene works through his pain as the boys audition ("Tears on My Pillow"). Lois likes the boys, but thinks they need to add a fourth member to become a proper doo-wop quartet. After hearing Duke sing ("Fools Fall in Love"), the boys welcome him into the group and Lois realizes her budding romantic feelings for him. As the newly formed quartet rehearses, Denny struggles with Duke singing lead ("Runaround Sue"). Lois tries to add polish to the rough edges of their act ("Lonely Teardrops"), triggering Wally, Eugene, and Denny to fantasize about their love for her ("Lovin' Lois Medley"). Little do the boys realize that Lois has fallen hard for Duke ("I Only Have Eyes for You"), and she surprises him with a kiss. Duke is startled and runs off, leaving the boys oblivious to the unfolding drama, begging Lois to stay and rehearse with them ("Stay"). The next night, Denny, Wally, and Eugene rehearse while imagining themselves with Lois ("(Just Like) Romeo and Juliet"), when Duke arrives to offer the guys some advice about girls and love in general ("A Sunday Kind of Love"). When Lois arrives, Duke quits the group and runs out. Lois tells the boys that she told her parents she was in love with Duke, and then her father fired Duke from the Auto Shop. Lois laments her unrequited love ("Unchained Melody").

=== Act 2 ===
The next day, the boys show Lois they can still perform without Duke ("Dreamin’"), but Lois is unsure. They implore Lois to go after Duke and bring him back ("Easier Said Than Done"). They thank her for helping them improve as a group ("The Magic Touch"), which helps Lois decide to go find Duke and bring him back for the sake of the group and her own happiness ("Lonely Teardrops Reprise"). The next morning ("Buzz Buzz Buzz") Duke returns just in time to sing for the contest. The boys have since learned a little about love themselves, and help Duke realize some important lessons ("The Glory of Love"). Lois arrives, and Duke is prompted by the boys to finally reveal his love for her ("Duke of Earl"). The finale sequence features Denny & The Dreamers returning from their triumphant world tour ("Pretty Little Angel Eyes"), and the quartet becomes a quintet as Lois joins them onstage in a doo-wop finale extravaganza ("Do You Love Me/The Twist"/“Rama lama ding dong"/Unchained Melody (Reprise)").

== Musical numbers ==
Act I

- "Life Could Be a Dream (Sh-Boom)" – Denny and Eugene
- "Get a Job" – Denny and Eugene
- "Mama Don't Allow It" – Denny and Eugene
- "Tears on My Pillow" – Eugene
- "Fools Fall in Love" – Duke
- "Runaround Sue" – Duke
- "Lonely Teardrops" – Lois
- Lovin' Lois Medley ("Devil or Angel"/"Earth Angel"/"Only You") – Dreamers
- "I Only Have Eyes for You" – Lois
- "Stay" – Dreamers
- "(Just Like) Romeo and Juliet" – Denny, Eugene, and Wally
- "A Sunday Kind of Love" – Duke
- "Unchained Melody" – Lois

Act II

- "Dreamin'" – Denny, Eugene, and Wally
- "Easier Said Than Done" – Denny, Eugene, and Wally
- "The Magic Touch" – Denny Eugene, and Wally
- "“Lonely Teardrops (Reprise)" – Lois
- "Buzz Buzz Buzz" – Dreamers
- "The Glory of Love" – Dreamers
- "Duke of Earl" – Duke
- "Pretty Little Angel Eyes" – Dreamers
- "Do You Love Me"/"The Twist"/"Rama lama ding dong"/"Unchained Melody (Reprise)" – Company

== Original cast ==
- Denny Varney – Daniel Tatar
- Eugene Johnson – Jim Holdridge
- Wally Patton – Ryan Castellino
- Duke Henderson – Doug Carpenter
- Lois Franklin / Mrs. Varney – Jessica Keenan Wynn

== Awards and nominations ==
- L.A. Drama Critics Circle Award
  - Best Production of the Year
  - Best Ensemble
  - Best Musical Direction
- LA Weekly Theatre Award
  - Best Musical of the Year
- Garland Award
  - Best Production of the Year
  - Best Ensemble
  - Best Musical Direction
