= Roger Bean =

American writer, director and producer (born 1962)

- Born: March 20, 1962 (age 64); Seattle, Washington
- Occupations: Writer, director, producer
- Writing career
- Notable works: The Marvelous Wonderettes; Route 66; Honky Tonk Laundry; The Andrews Brothers; Life Could Be A Dream; Why Do Fools Fall In Love.
- Notable awards: 2007 Ovation Award for Best Musical Intimate Theatre (The Marvelous Wonderettes)
- Website: rogerbean.com

Roger Bean (born March 20, 1962) is an American writer and director who specializes in jukebox musicals.

Bean wrote The Marvelous Wonderettes, which played Off-Broadway at the Westside Theatre in New York City. The Marvelous Wonderettes was first written for the Milwaukee Repertory Theater, where Bean created various other musicals utilizing established and lesser-known radio and popular hits. The Andrews Brothers, Winter Wonderettes, Don't Touch That Dial!, Route 66, That's Amoré, Life Could Be A Dream, Honky Tonk Laundry and Why Do Fools Fall In Love? have been produced in various theaters across the country (Musical Theatre West, Welk Resort Theatre, Delaware Theatre Company, Oregon Cabaret Theatre, The Laguna Playhouse, Madison Repertory Theatre, Fullerton Civic Light Opera, Phoenix Theatre, Water Tower Theatre, Invisible Theatre, and many others). In 2007, The Marvelous Wonderettes received the Los Angeles Ovation Award for Best Musical Intimate Theatre, and played a record-setting 18 months at the El Portal Theatre in North Hollywood, California. Bean was also nominated for two Ovation Awards for Direction of a Musical for the Los Angeles productions of The Marvelous Wonderettes and Winter Wonderettes.

Roger Bean's work as a director has been seen on the stages of the Milwaukee Repertory Theater, Delaware Theatre Company, The Laguna Playhouse, Utah Shakespeare Festival, Madison Repertory Theatre, Oregon Cabaret Theatre, Skylight Music Theatre, and numerous stages in between. Bean directed the premiere of Lend Me a Tenor: The Musical at the Utah Shakespeare Festival, written by Peter Sham and Brad Carroll, based on the Tony Award-winning play by Ken Ludwig.

Bean was the Executive Director of Steele Spring Productions/Stage Rights, a theatrical licensing and royalty company, until selling it to Broadway Licensing in 2022.

He is a member of the Stage Directors and Choreographers Society and the Dramatists Guild.

== Works ==
- The Marvelous Wonderettes
- The Marvelous Wonderettes: Dream On
- The Marvelous Wonderettes: Caps & Gowns
- Winter Wonderettes
- Summer of Love
- The Andrews Brothers
- Don't Touch That Dial!
- Route 66
- That's Amoré
- Life Could Be A Dream
- Honky Tonk Laundry
- Why Do Fools Fall In Love?
