= Maine State Music Theatre =

Professional performing arts organization based in Brunswick, Maine

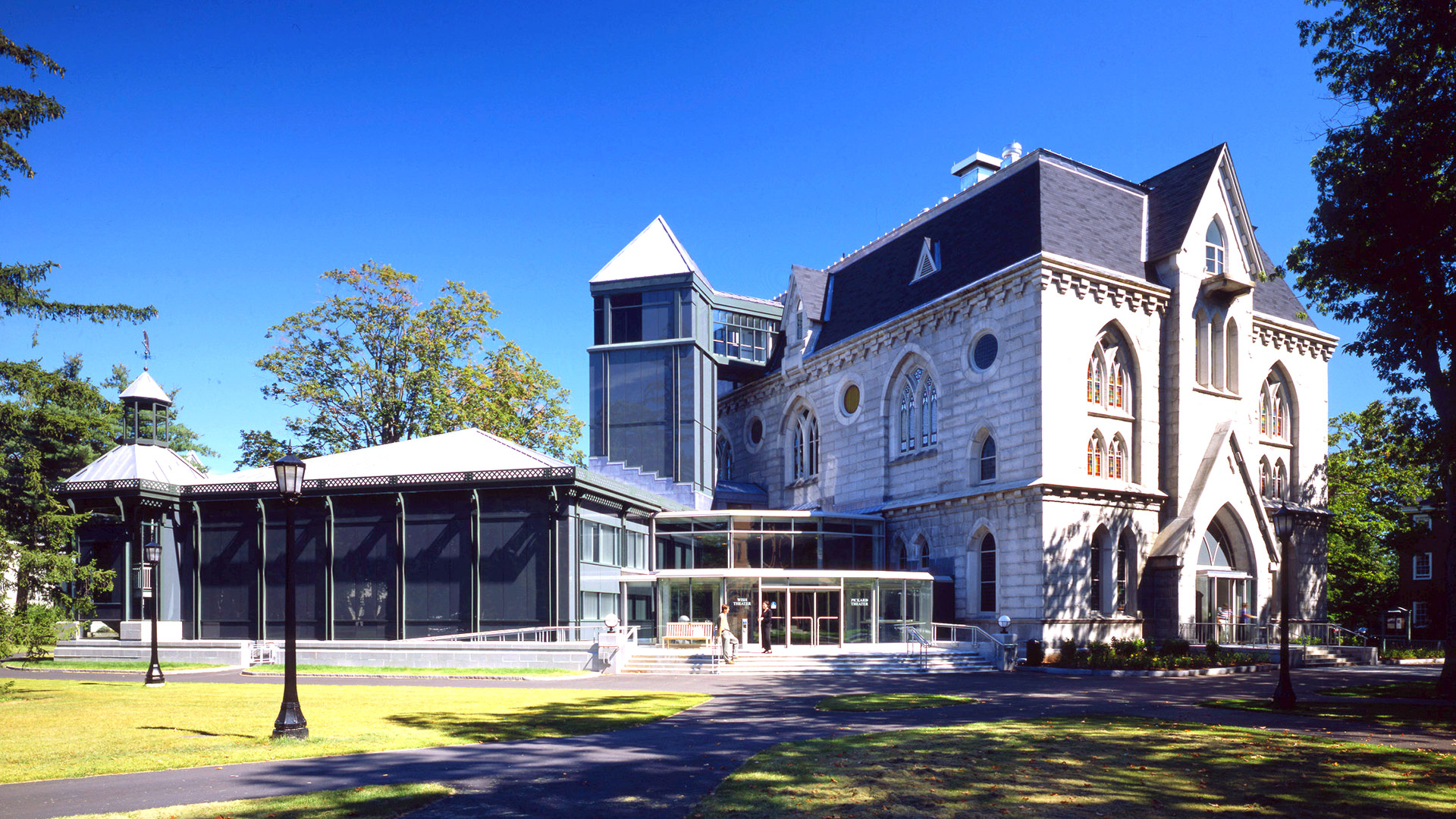
- Pickard Theater at Bowdoin College
- Interactive map of Maine State Music Theatre
- Former names: Brunswick Music Theatre
- Address: 22 Elm Street; Brunswick, Maine; United States
- Coordinates: 43.9127°N 69.9660°W
- Operator: Victoria Crandall (founder); Curt Dale Clark (artistic director); Stephanie Dupal (managing director)
- Capacity: 598 (Pickard Theater)
- Type: Regional theatre

Construction
- Opened: 1959 (67 years ago)

Website
- https://msmt.org

Maine State Music Theatre (MSMT) is a professional performing arts organization based at the Pickard Theater on the campus of Bowdoin College in Brunswick, Maine, United States. MSMT presents a summer season of four fully staged musicals, a concert series, and a Theatre for Young Audiences series.

== History ==
=== Early years (1950s–1970s) ===
MSMT began as Brunswick Music Theatre (BMT). Founded by Victoria Crandall, BMT opened in 1959 with a summer production of Song of Norway. In the next decade, playhouses became quite prevalent in New England. BMT was one of the few that exclusively produced musical theatre. In the 1970s, BMT changed to a non-profit organization in order to focus on establishing an intern program that intended to help equip young and emerging theatre artists for their intended industry.

=== Name change and growing influence (1980s–1990s) ===
In 1988, BMT celebrated its 30th anniversary. Governor John R. McKernan presented an award to founder Vicki Crandall, and the organization changed its name to Maine State Music Theatre to reflect that its influence had reached past the Midcoast region of the state. By this time, the number of professional theaters in New England had been significantly reduced. MSMT was one of the few remaining musical houses.

=== 21st century ===
During the late 2000s, as the severity of the housing crisis grew, MSMT was presented with an opportunity to make the Gorham campus of the University of Southern Maine its home base. The Board of Trustees opted to remain in Brunswick, as they were committed to remaining in the birthplace of the organization. This commitment prompted them to purchase the Maine Line Bus Garage on Elm Street. The space was renovated to become a permanent home for MSMT, complete with administrative offices, rehearsal spaces and technical facilities. Performances would still take place in the Pickard Theater.

In 2015, MSMT announced a three-year $2 million capital campaign to assist with upgrades, housing, and maintenance.

The COVID-19 pandemic forced MSMT to cancel its previously announced 2020 season, the first time a summer season had been canceled by the organization. MSMT created the Lifeline Fund to offset losses and remain strong and prepared for 2021. Subscribers and patrons, businesses and organizations rallied to support the theatre during this difficult time, preserving the legacy of the organization. Though a 2021 season was announced, the pandemic forced MSMT to cancel all events, other than its production of Jersey Boys. In 2022, MSMT returned for a full summer season.

=== Notable alumni ===
Theatre artists who have gone through the MSMT Educational Fellowship Program include Lindsay Nicole Chambers (2002), Barrett Foa (1997), Marty Lauter (2017) and Aaron Lazar (1996).

== Seasons ==
Extended content

=== 2000 ===
Big River • The Sound of Music • Swingtime Canteen • Titanic • Victor/Victoria

=== 2001 ===
Footloose • Little Shop of Horrors • Oklahoma! • The Scarlet Pimpernel

=== 2002 ===
Chicago • The King and I • Ragtime • She Loves Me

=== 2003 ===
Hans Christian Anderson (Loesser) • Jekyll & Hyde • La Cage Aux Folles • Smokey Joe's Cafe

=== 2004 ===
Brigadoon • Follies • Kiss Me, Kate • Pump Boys and Dinettes

=== 2005 ===
Cats • Mame • Miss Saigon • Swing!

=== 2006 ===
South Pacific • Beauty and the Beast • Aida • The Full Monty

=== 2007 ===
West Side Story • Thoroughly Modern Millie • Grand Hotel • Hairspray

=== 2008 ===
Jesus Christ Superstar • All Shook Up • The Producers • Les Misérables

=== 2009 ===
The Light in the Piazza • Crazy for You • Dirty Rotten Scoundrels • The Drowsy Chaperone

=== 2010 ===
Always, Patsy Cline • My Fair Lady • Chicago • Spamalot

=== 2011 ===
The Marvelous Wonderettes • Annie • Xanadu • The Wiz

=== 2012 ===
A Chorus Line • Legally Blonde • Sunset Boulevard • 42nd Street

=== 2013 ===
Dreamgirls • Les Misérables • Gypsy • Mary Poppins

=== 2014 ===
Buddy: The Buddy Holly Story • Chamberlain: A Civil War Romance (Knapp & Alper) • Seven Brides for Seven Brothers • Footloose

=== 2015 ===
The Full Monty • Sister Act • The Music Man • Young Frankenstein

=== 2016 ===
Ghost • Evita • Fiddler on the Roof • Mamma Mia!

=== 2017 ===
Always, Patsy Cline • Guys and Dolls • Grease • Newsies

=== 2018 ===
Million Dollar Quartet • Beauty and the Beast • Saturday Night Fever • Singin' in the Rain

=== 2019 ===
Sophisticated Ladies • Treasure Island (Robin & Clark) • Hello, Dolly! • The Wizard of Oz

=== 2020 (CANCELED DUE TO COVID-19) ===
~~Titanic~~ • ~~Mamma Mia!~~ • ~~The Sound of Music~~ • ~~Something Rotten!~~

=== 2021 (ABRIDGED DUE TO COVID-19) ===
~~Kinky Boots~~ • ~~Cinderella~~ • ~~The Color Purple~~ • Jersey Boys

=== 2022 ===
The Sound of Music • Joseph and the Amazing Technicolor Dreamcoat • The Color Purple • Kinky Boots

=== 2023 ===
Titanic • Buddy: The Buddy Holly Story • 9 to 5 • Something Rotten!

=== 2024 ===
South Pacific • Funny Girl • White Christmas • Beautiful: The Carol King Musical

=== 2025 ===
Anastasia • Tootsie • Footloose • West Side Story

=== 2026 ===
Hairspray • 1776 • Frozen • Come from Away

=== 2027 ===
My Fair Lady • Some Like It Hot • Heartbreak Hotel • Phantom
