= Wooden O Symposium =

Conference about the era of William Shakespeare

Logo

The Wooden O Symposium is a cross disciplinary conference exploring Medieval, Renaissance, and Early Modern Studies, through the study and performance of the works of William Shakespeare. Scholars from many disciplines present papers that offer insights and new ideas springing from the era of William Shakespeare.

The symposium is hosted by Southern Utah University, home of the Tony Award-winning Utah Shakespearean Festival. A major focus of the scholarly event is the interface between scholarship and performance and how the pursuit of one area can enrich and inform the other.

The festival is noted for the Adams Memorial Theater, an open air performance space modeled after Shakespeare's own Globe Theatre, the original "Wooden O."

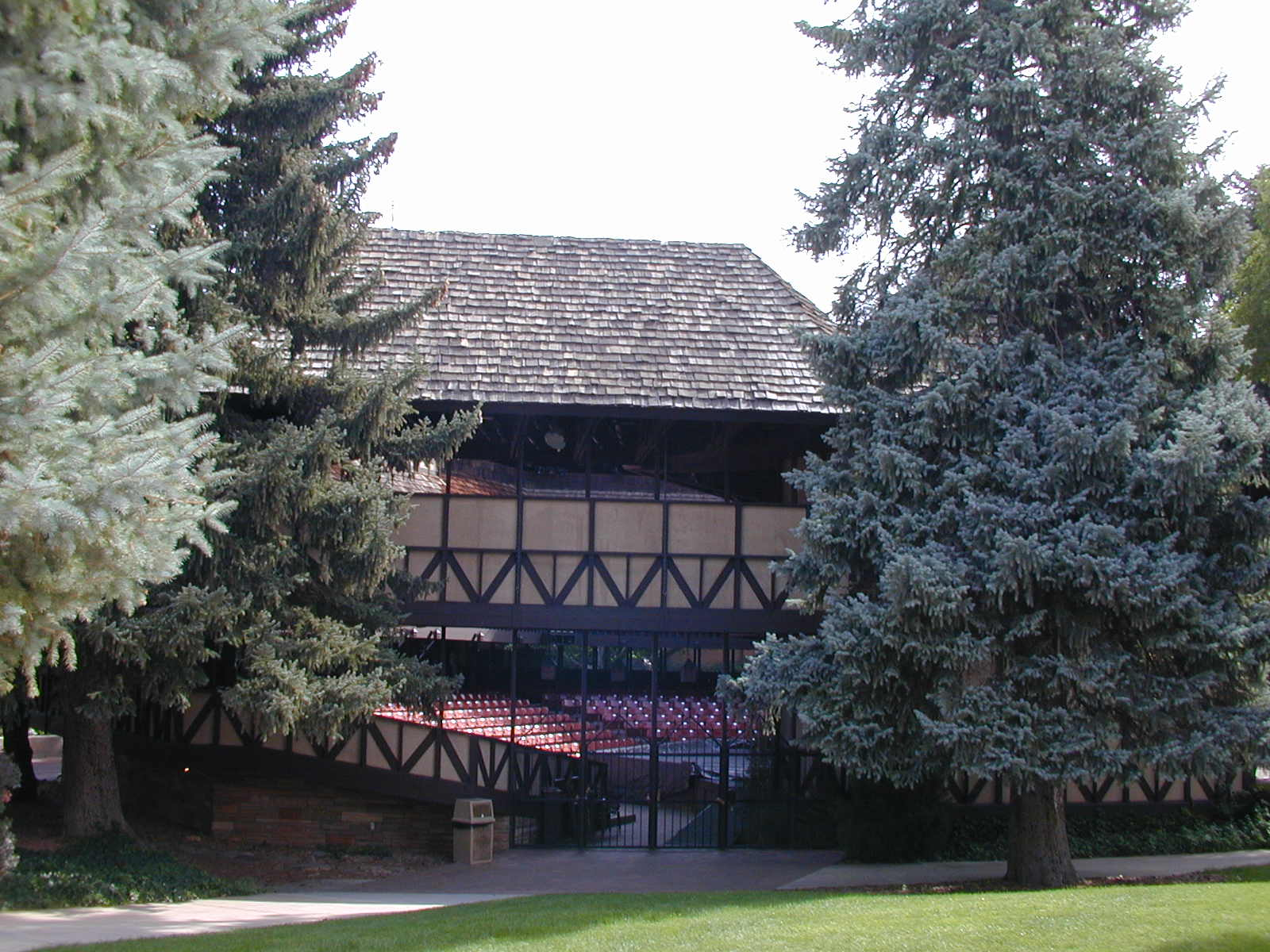
The Adams Theater on the campus of Southern Utah University

This academic conference takes place every year in Cedar City, Utah and runs the first Monday through Wednesday of August.
