= Bobby Pearce (designer) =

American costume designer (born 1961)

- Born: February 15, 1961 (age 65); Miami, Florida, United States
- Occupations: Costume Designer, Author
- Writing career
- Notable works: Taboo; The Marvelous Wonderettes; The Big Gay Sketch Show; The Rosie O'Donnell Show
- Notable awards: 2004 Tony Award (nomination)
- Website: www.bobbypearce.com

Bobby Pearce (born February 15, 1961) is an American costume designer for stage, film and television. He lives in New York City.

== Early life and education ==
Pearce was born and raised in Miami, Florida. He holds a BA from Barry University in Miami, and an MFA in design from Wayne State University in Detroit, Michigan.

He began his career in show business as a performer specialized in musical comedy but is also a classically trained mime and studied with Marcel Marceau.

== Career ==
Bobby Pearce was nominated for the Tony Award for Best Costume Design and the Outer Critics Circle Award for Outstanding Costume Design for the 2003 production of Taboo starring Boy George. He also designed Signed, Sealed, Delivered at the Venetian Hotel in Las Vegas, the award-winning production of The Syringa Tree (New York and London), the National Tour of Tommy, three gowns for Liza Minnelli's appearance in Michael Jackson's 30th Anniversary Celebration, The Rosie O'Donnell Show, (Halloween 1999–2001) and Broadway's Betrayal starring Juliette Binoche (Associate Costume Designer). In addition he designed the films Let It Snow starring Bernadette Peters and The Big Gay Musical. Pearce also designed Chita Rivera's concert tour Chita, And All That Jazz and Off-Broadway's Behind the Beat starring Vicki Sue Robinson.

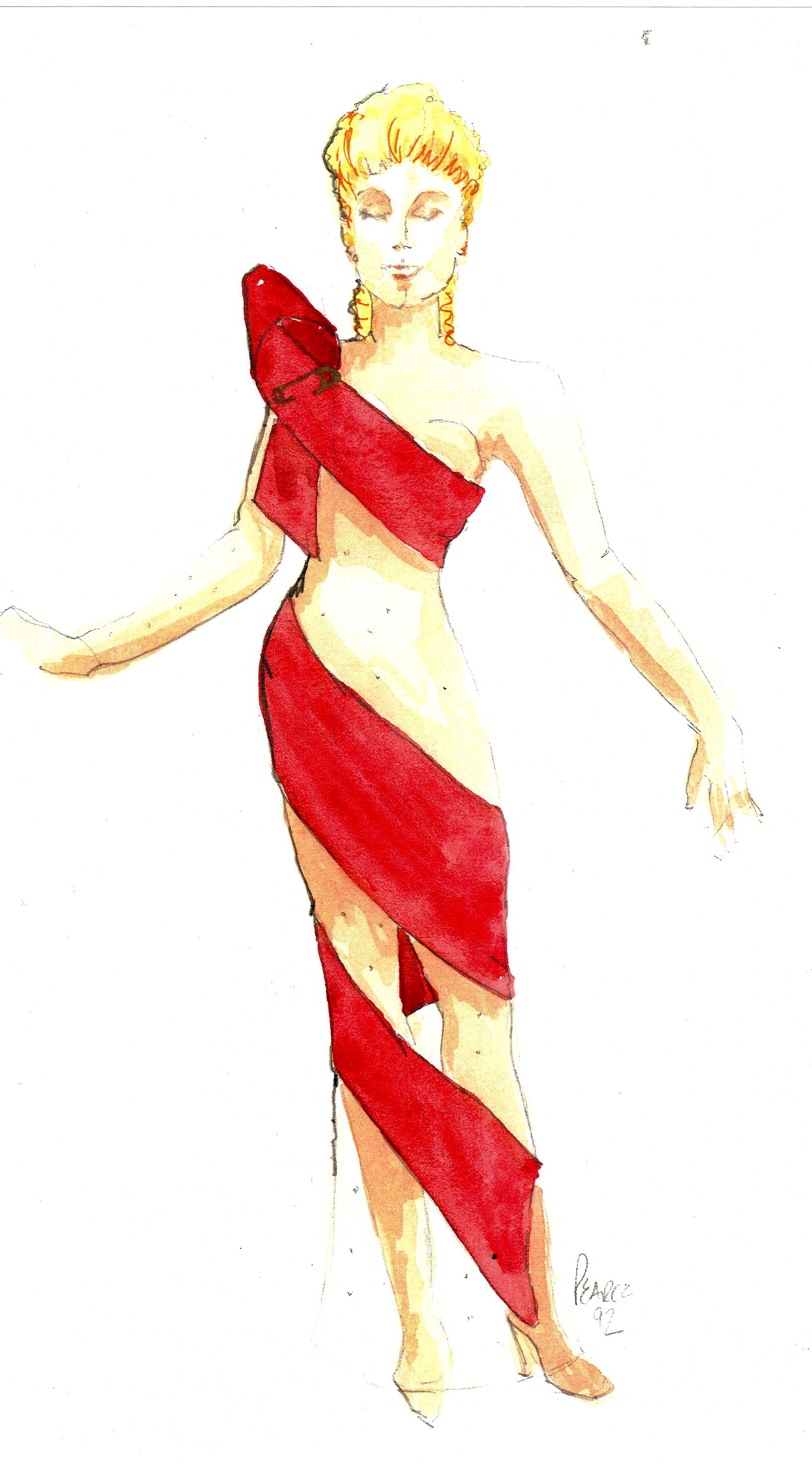
Sketch by Bobby Pearce for a gown designed to be worn by Marla Maples

Pearce designed the wigs and costumes for the long running Off-Broadway musical The Marvelous Wonderettes which has had numerous regional productions. His work has received critical acclaim. Philip Kennicott with The Washington Post commented that his costume design for L'incoronazione di Poppea at Wolf Trap Opera "makes references to the Italy of Caesar and the Italy of Versace but keeps them in a state of suspended animation. Poppea has clearly enjoyed the ministrations of a 20th century couturier.

For Mark Dendy's Altogether Different at the Joyce Theater in New York, his costumes were called "enjoyably splashy and sexy" (The New York Times), "excellent costumes" (The Village Voice) and "a smashing revue parade of 13 separate numbers, all stylishly costumed by Bobby Pearce" (Clive Barnes, The New York Post).

Reviews for Taboo include "What the show does have and could not exist without - is a great sense of style - on top of this come nonstop outlandish, freaky and beautiful costumes" (New York Newsday), and "flagrantly stylish, outrageously sexy ... sit back and watch the fashion show" (Ben Brantley, The New York Times).

Pearce has also designed the costumes for world champion American ice dancers Maia and Alex Shibutani as well as outfits for personal appearances and club acts of numerous celebrities including Bea Arthur, Petula Clark, Bebe Neuwirth, Faith Prince, Larry Gatlin, Martin Short, Madeline Kahn, Elizabeth Ashley, Cyd Charisse, Glenn Close, Sheena Easton, Leslie Uggams, Laurie Beechman and Tracey Ullman. He has designed over 30 gowns for Marla Maples, many of which have been featured in numerous magazines. His favorite "diva" to date was the late Gwen Verdon, for whom he designed over a dozen gowns. Pearce also designed the costumes for The Big Gay Sketch Show on Logo TV, which began its third season in 2010.

Pearce has a longtime association with Rosie O'Donnell. He has been featured in the magazine Rosie and has made over a dozen appearances on The Rosie O'Donnell Show doing crafts and singing songs with O'Donnell. He appears as a regular on Rosie Radio (O'Donnell's daily morning radio show) on Sirius and XM Radio.

== Book ==
In August 2016, Pearce released his first craft book, The Art of Paper Flowers, published by Creative Publishing International in hardback format. Rosie O'Donnell says in the book's foreword: "I love this book. Not because my friend Bobby—or as I like to call him, Tony-nominated Costume Designer Bobby Pearce—wrote it, but because it's exquisite and beautiful … He was the secret sauce that made my own craft book the success that it was … He's the real deal, and so is The Art of Paper Flowers. Enjoy it in as many ways as you like: for the beauty in its pages, the humor and heart in its words, or the patterns and instructions that will let you create crafts as beautiful as Bobby's. Me, I'm going for all three."

Four months after its release, The Art of Paper Flowers was named Amazon Editors' Holiday Gift Pick for Design, Construct, and Create! and went into its second printing. The book garnered positive reviews: "You'll want to run to the craft store for supplies when you see the gorgeous paper blooms Bobby Pearce created for this easy-to-follow book. Using his grandmother's full-size patterns from more than 40 years ago, Pearce instructs readers on how to make 35 flower varieties— some so lifelike you’ll swear they grew in the garden." – 'Country Woman Magazine'. Publishers Weekly stated: "Gorgeous pictures make it immediately clear why one would want to devote time to making paper flowers rather than buying silk flora at the craft store, and the range of flowers adds to the book's appeal. This is a fantastic mix of inspiration and real care in pattern making."

The book has been translated into French and Dutch.

== Awards and nominations ==
- 2004 Tony Award Nomination for Best Costume Design – Taboo
- 2004 Outer Critics Circle Award Nomination for Outstanding Costume Design – Taboo
- 2008 New York Innovative Theatre Award Nomination for Outstanding Costume Design - The Chaos Theories
