= Baby Case =

- Music: Michael Ogborn
- Lyrics: Michael Ogborn
- Book: Michael Ogborn
- Basis: The Lindbergh kidnapping
- Productions: 2002 Arden Theatre Company (Philadelphia); 2012 New York Musical Theatre Festival

Baby Case is a musical with book, music, and lyrics by Michael Ogborn. The show is based on the famous Lindbergh baby kidnapping, commonly known as the "Crime of the Century". The musical, which had its world premiere at the Arden Theatre Company in Philadelphia, has gone on to win multiple awards, including the "Best of Fest" award in the 2012 New York Musical Theatre Festival.

== Productions ==
The musical originally ran at the Arden Theatre Company in Philadelphia, Pennsylvania as a part of its 2001/2002 season.

The musical had its New York debut in 2012 in the New York Musical Theatre Festival. Direction was by Jeremy Dobrish, with choreography by Warren Adams. The cast consisted of Will Reynolds, Anika Larsen, Melissa van der Schyff, Eugene Barry-Hill, Jason Collins, Hannah Elless, Tom Riis Farrell, Michael Thomas Holmes, Matthew G. Myers, Patricia Noonan, and Kurt Zischke.

== Musical numbers ==
Act 1

- American Hero - Ensemble
- Nurse's Song - Betty Gow
- Someone's Taken the Lindbergh Baby - Ensemble
- To Search for You - Anne Lindbergh and Charles Lindbergh
- Lullaby - Anne Lindbergh
- Baby Case - William Randolph Hearst, Reporters, and Ensemble
- A Picture of You - Photographer and Girls
- Pull Over Here - William Allen and Girls
- Dirty Dishes - Violet Sharpe
- Over the Sea - Charles Lindbergh
- Wake Up New York - Walter Winchell, Barry, Lyle, and Ensemble

Act 2

- Baby Case (reprise) - Orchestra and Ensemble
- Scapegoat - Bruno Hauptmann
- Lawsuit Daddy - Mrs. Wilentz, Secretary, and Women
- Flemington Jingle - Studio Sisters
- Hauptmann Murdered the Lindbergh Baby! - Ensemble
- Lucky Locks - Studio Sisters
- Hour of Gold - St. Johns and Anne Lindbergh
- If That's What Greets a Hero - Millard Whited and Company
- Ladder Song - Ladder Lady
- No, I Never Did - Bruno Hauptmann
- Trial Drinking Song - Reporters and Ensemble
- Unmerciful Hearts - Anna Hauptmann
- Invitation to an Execution - Men
- Execution March - Ensemble
- One Little Boy - Anne Lindbergh
- Over, Said, and Done - Ensemble

== Reception ==
In her review of the New York Musical Theatre Festival production, Anita Gates of the New York Times wrote: "This production has rousing songs, big voices, stylish staging and choreography, first-rate lighting and handsome period costumes. And framing it with the radio bulletins of Walter Winchell (Michael Thomas Holmes), the celebrity-gossip king of his day, was a smart idea." The Huffington Post review wrote: "We were both overwhelmed by Ogborn's wit, juxtaposition of historical elements, his range of you-can't-keep-your-toes-from-tapping syncopation, his you-actually-walk-out-humming-them melodies and his handling of a complex and complicated subject...a cut above the original. Director Jeremy Dobrish deserves an E for Exceptionallly Excellent for his revisions."

== Awards and nominations ==
The musical received four Barrymore Awards for Excellence in Theater in 2002, including Best Musical. In 2012, it received four NYMF awards, including Best of Fest.
