= The Marvelous Wonderettes =

Musical

- Cast recording album cover
- Music: Various artists
- Lyrics: Various artists
- Book: Roger Bean
- Basis: Pop songs of the 1950s and 1960s
- Productions: 1999 Milwaukee; 2001 Milwaukee; 2006 Los Angeles; 2008 Off-Broadway; 2016 Off-Broadway

The Marvelous Wonderettes is a jukebox musical comedy with a book by Roger Bean. The show, which uses pop songs from the 1950s and 1960s as a vehicle to tell its story, pays homage to the high school Songleader squads of the 50s. When called upon to perform at their senior prom as a last minute replacement, Springfield High Songleaders Betty Jean, Cindy Lou, Missy and Suzy, rally together to entertain their classmates in four-part harmony. The second act shows the four ten years later at a high school reunion.

The musical includes the songs "Lollipop", "Dream Lover", "Stupid Cupid", "Lipstick on Your Collar", "Hold Me, Thrill Me, Kiss Me", "It's My Party", and "It's In His Kiss (The Shoop Shoop Song)".

== Background ==
In 1998, fresh off a run of Bean's first musical, Don't Touch That Dial! at the Milwaukee Repertory Theater, Bean was asked to write a new musical for their intimate black box space, the Stackner Cabaret. Bean suggested a musical about high school song leaders from the 50s and 60s, best friends, singing at prom for their best friends and boyfriends. He would use pop songs from the 50s and 60s to tell story of the characters. In this way, The Marvelous Wonderettes was born in 1999.

With limited backstage space, Bean needed to write a script in which the actors could remain onstage through most if not all of the show. Thus the original one-act version of The Marvelous Wonderettes came to be. Through the years it has grown from its much simpler one-act format to its current, fully realized, two-act version.

== Production history ==
=== Milwaukee Productions ===
The original production directed by book writer Roger Bean opened at the Milwaukee Repertory Theater in 1999. Due to the production's success, it was revived in 2001 with direction by Bean once again. The show starred Laurie Birmingham (Betty Jean), Rhae Ann Theriault (Cindy Lou), Becky Spice (Missy), and Bets Malone (Suzy).

=== Los Angeles Production ===
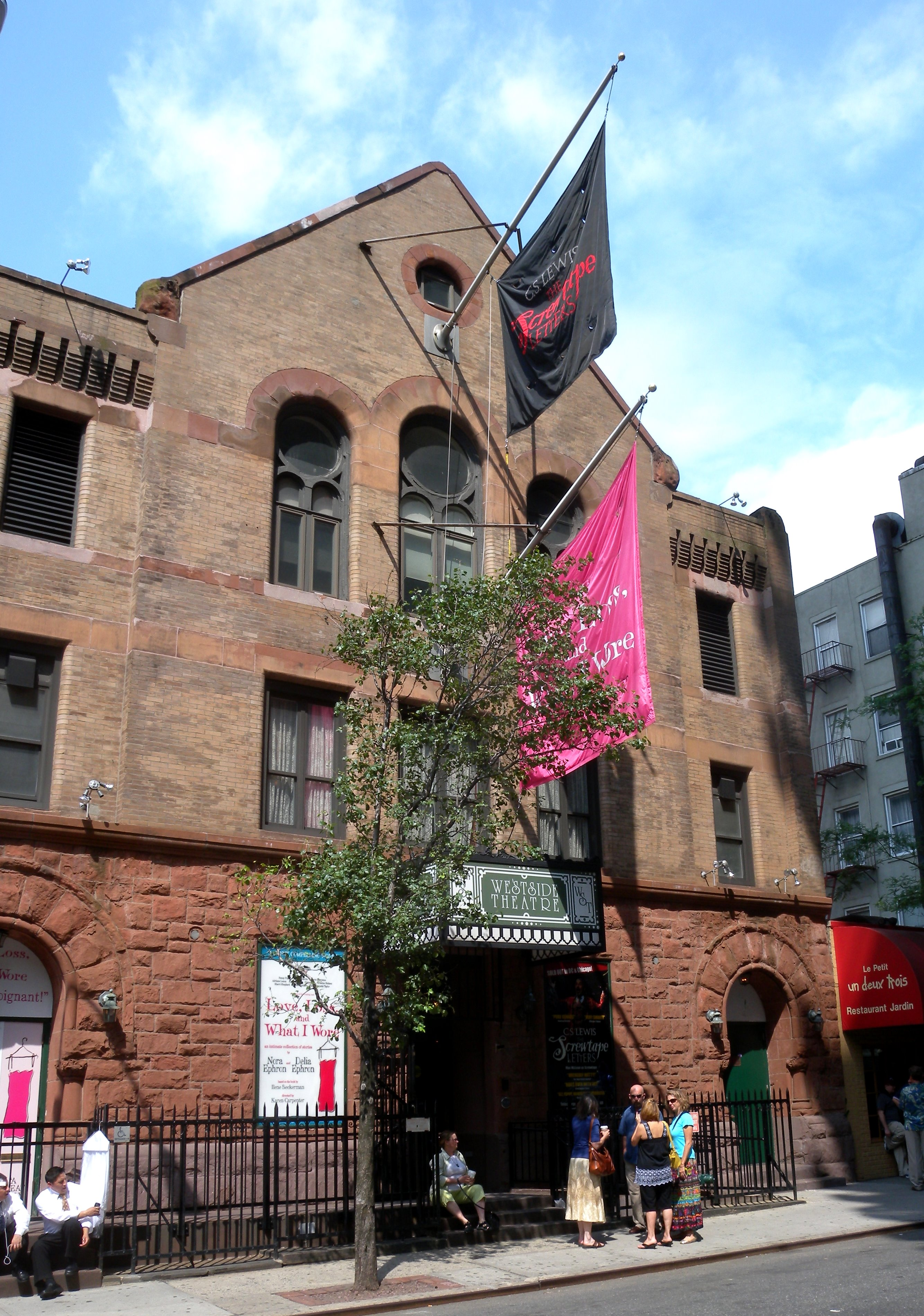
The exterior of the Westside Theatre

A successful Los Angeles production opened at the El Portal Forum Theatre on September 29, 2006. It starred Julie Dixon Jackson (Betty Jean), Kristen Chandler (Cindy Lou), Kim Huber (Missy), and Bets Malone returning to play Suzy.

=== Off-Broadway Production ===
The original off-Broadway cast included Beth Malone (Betty Jean), Victoria Matlock (Cindy Lou), Farah Alvin (Missy), and Bets Malone (Suzy) with Lauren Pastorek and Melissa Robinette as "Wonderstudies". This was Beth Malone's second time playing Suzy. The production opened on September 14, 2008, at Westside Theatre. Vocal arrangements and musical direction were by Brian William Baker and Roger Bean with choreography was by Janet Miller; Bean, once again, directed the production. The creative team included Michael Carnahan (sets), Bobby Pearce (wigs and costumes), Jeremy Pivnick (lights) and Cricket S. Myers (sound).

=== Off-Broadway Revival ===
An off-Broadway revival opened on April 28, 2016, with Sally Schwab (Betty Jean), Jenna Leigh Green (Cindy Lou), Christina Bianco (Missy), and Kathy Brier (Suzy). The production was directed by Tom and Michael D'Angora. Throughout its run, Diana DeGarmo and Ryann Redmond both played Suzy after Brier left the production. Kristy Cates eventually replaced Bianco as Missy.

=== UK Premiere ===
The UK Premiere production ran at Upstairs at the Gatehouse in London from April 9, 2019, with Sophie Camble (Missy), Louise Young (Betty Jean), Kara Taylor Alberts (Suzy) and Rosie Needham (Cinder Lou). It was directed by Joseph Hodges and produced by Gardner Hodges Entertainment. This production subsequently transferred to the Theatre Royal Windsor for an extended run.

== Synopsis ==
=== Act I ===
The story takes place at Springfield High School. It's prom night and the gym is filled with homemade decorations. The show begins when the school's principal, Principal Varney, welcomes the class of 1958 to their Super Senior Prom and introduces the night's entertainment, The Marvelous Wonderettes. As the lights come up on the girls they sing "Mr. Sandman". Each are in their respective colors: Missy – tangerine, Suzy – blue, Cindy Lou – pink, and Betty Jean – green. During the song it becomes apparent that Suzy is dating the guy running the lights for the prom, Ritchie Stevens. After introducing themselves, the girls begin their second song of the evening, "Lollipop", which transitions into "Sugartime". After the song, the girls show off the cheer that won them third place at the State Song Leaders' competition and thank the teacher who leads their team, Mr. Lee.

When Betty Jean runs off to put their trophy in the school trophy case, Cindy Lou seizes her opportunity to steal Betty Jean's song, "Allegheny Moon". Hilarity ensues when Betty Jean returns to find that she's been duped. She tries her hardest to ruin Cindy Lou's performance, but Cindy Lou finds a way to recover.

After the song, Suzy and Missy explain to the promgoers (audience members) the events which led to them providing the entertainment that evening. It turns out that the boys from the glee club were supposed to perform, but the lead singer, Billy Ray Patton, was suspended from school for smoking ("Tobacco can kill, and make you ill."), so Mr. Lee called on The Marvelous Wonderettes to take their place. The girls announce that the theme of the prom is "Marvelous Dreams" and segue nicely into a medley of "All I Have to Do Is Dream" and "Dream Lover".

Missy then announces the nominees for that year's Prom Queen, who will get to choose her King after winning the vote. All four of the Marvelous Wonderettes are nominated along with Judy Carter, a girl with whom they have homeroom. Then it's time for the dreamcatcher, which will determine the order in which the girls will sing their solos. Suzy is selected to go first. In her giggly excitement, Suzy announces that her song is for her prom date, Ritchie, and then begins to sing "Stupid Cupid". Next up is Betty Jean, who sings "Lipstick on Your Collar", during which the audience discovers that her boyfriend, Johnny, has been cheating on her with Cindy Lou. A confrontation between the two girls is broken up by Suzy, who urges Betty Jean to calm down and continue with the performance. Cindy Lou is up next and sings "Lucky Lips". Betty Jean stands in the background mocking her performance, attempting to thwart Cindy Lou, but once again, Cindy Lou recovers gracefully. The only one left to sing is Missy, who sings "Secret Love". After her song, she announces that her secret love is Mr. Lee, the girl's Songleader Leader. Mr. Lee (who was chosen from the audience at the top of the show), is brought on stage and the girls serenade him with the songs "Mr. Lee", "Born Too Late", and "Teacher's Pet".

After returning Mr. Lee to his seat, an announcement is made over the loudspeaker that it's time for the talent portion of the Prom Queen competition. Missy explains that to keep things moving along, the rules committee has decided that all the girls will perform their talents simultaneously and only have 30 seconds in which to perform. Judy Carter has been excused from the talent portion because of a doctor's appointment. The girls scramble to set up their talents. Cindy Lou shows off a myriad of poses, Missy sings her best note over and over again, Suzy uses a lemon twist while blowing giant bubbles with her gum, and Betty Jean rushes to set up her fire baton routine, but the buzzer goes off before she has time to even light the baton.

Now it is time for everyone to vote for Prom Queen. The audience take out their ballots (included in the playbill) and circle their choice for queen as the girls wander through the theatre collecting the completed ballots. When the ballots are collected they are given to the girls' French teacher, Miss McPhereson, who is supposed to count them. As the ballots are being tallied, the girls sing a medley of "Sincerely" and "Goodnight Sweetheart, Goodnight". At the end of the song, it is announced that Suzy has been voted Prom Queen. Cindy Lou, who expected to win, is distraught, Betty Jean couldn't be happier that Cindy Lou lost, and Suzy is so surprised she chokes on her gum. Missy announces that it's time for Suzy to pick her Prom King. The girls ask her three questions, and through Suzy's answers discover that she has, to no one's surprise, chosen her prom date, Ritchie Stevens. Since she won, Suzy gets to sing a spotlight song, "Hold Me, Thrill Me, Kiss Me", which swells at the end when the other girls join in. The girls gather around and congratulate Suzy, except for Cindy Lou, who reaches out to touch the crown as the lights fade and intermission begins.

=== Act II ===
Act two begins with Principal Varney welcoming everyone back to Springfield High School and their ten-year reunion. The Marvelous Wonderettes are back to entertain everyone for the night. "Heatwave" begins to play and Cindy Lou, Betty Jean, and Missy appear to sing it. Noticeably missing is Suzy. When she finally enters, the audience discovers that she is pregnant. After the song, a brief reintroduction is made and the girls sing "Mr. Sandman" in tribute to their prom performance.

Ritchie, who is now Suzy's husband, is back running the lights, but it becomes apparent that they have run into some tough times in their relationship. To cheer her up, Missy decides to take out the dreamcatcher that they used at their senior prom. Despite her insistence that she put it in her purse that morning, Missy can't find it, so she decides they'll just ask each other the three questions that Suzy answered after winning Prom Queen. She says she'll go first, and the girls ask the questions: "Are you in love?" to which Missy answers, "yes"; "Is he someone we know?", another "yes"; "Is he here tonight", one more "yes", and Missy spills the beans. She has been dating Mr. Lee for the past five years. Now she has some questions for him, which she asks in her songs, "It's In His Kiss" and "Wedding Bell Blues".

Cindy Lou doesn't like what she sees; she thinks Missy shouldn't have to beg Mr. Lee for a marriage proposal, and helps her reclaim her confidence with the song "You Don't Own Me". After the song ends, Betty Jean discovers that Mr. Lee has had the dreamcatcher the whole time. She returns it to Missy, who discovers that Mr. Lee has attached an engagement ring to it! Overjoyed with the proposal, Missy breaks into song again, singing "With This Ring". Mr. Lee is brought back up on stage and the girls join Missy in singing as the happy couple celebrate.

Now that the dreamcatcher has been returned, the girls use it to select the next performer, Betty Jean. Missy says that it is Betty Jean's birthday as she takes the stage to relate what she's been up to since high school; she has been working at the neighborhood hardware store with her husband, the boy who used to cheat on her with Cindy Lou. It turns out things between her and her husband are just as bumpy now as they used to be. Lamenting, Betty Jean sings "I Only Want to Be With You". At the conclusion of her song she notices her husband spending time with Judy Carter. She sings "That's When The Tears Start" followed by "It's My Party". Cindy Lou attempts to comfort her, but Betty Jean is still angry with her about the events which took place in high school.

It's Cindy Lou's turn to perform next and she apologizes to Betty Jean as best she can before talking about her lack of luck in Hollywood, which resulted in her moving back to Springfield and falling in love with Billy Ray Patton, the rebel whose suspension from school 10 years earlier had led to the girls' performing. She sings "Son of A Preacher Man" and "Leader of the Pack" followed by "Maybe". After her song, Betty Jean opens her arms to Cindy Lou again and the two are reconciled.

Now it's Suzy's turn to take the stage. She is self-conscious of her pregnant body and still an emotional wreck about her personal life. She sings through tears "Maybe I Know". Missy tries to cheer her up, singing "Needle in a Haystack". Suzy, slowly gaining confidence, begins to sing "Rescue Me", but doesn't find her strength until her friends step up and support her in singing "RESPECT". At the end of the song, Ritchie blinks the lights to let Suzy know that he still loves her. In the end all is well again; Cindy Lou and Betty Jean are friends, Missy and Mr. Lee are getting married, and Suzy has reconnected with her husband. The girls sing "Thank You and Goodnight" to close out the show. As they exit they announce, "See you in 1978!".

== Musical numbers ==
Act I

- "Mr. Sandman" – Wonderettes
- "Sugar & Spice Medley (Lollipop/Sugartime)" – Wonderettes
- "Dreamer Medley (All I Have To Do Is Dream/Dream Lover)" – Wonderettes
- "Stupid Cupid" – Suzy, Wonderettes
- "Lipstick On Your Collar" – Betty Jean, Wonderettes
- "Lucky Lips" – Cindy Lou, Wonderettes
- "Secret Love" – Missy
- "Man of My Dreams Medley (Mr. Lee/Born Too Late/Teacher's Pet)" – Missy, Wonderettes
- "Goodnight and Goodbye Medley (Sincerely/Goodnight Sweetheart, Goodnight)" – Wonderettes
- "Hold Me, Thrill Me, Kiss Me" – Suzy, Wonderettes

Act II

- "Heatwave" – Wonderettes
- "Mr. Sandman (Reprise)" – Wonderettes†
- "It's in His Kiss" – Missy, Wonderettes
- "Wedding Bell Blues" – Missy, Wonderettes‡
- "You Don't Own Me" – Missy, Wonderettes
- "With This Ring" – Missy, Wonderettes
- "I Only Want To Be With You" – Betty Jean, Wonderettes
- "That's When The Tears Start" – Betty Jean, Wonderettes
- "It's My Party" – Betty Jean, Wonderettes
- "Son of a Preacher Man" – Cindy Lou, Wonderettes
- "Leader of the Pack" – Cindy Lou, Wonderettes
- "Maybe" – Cindy Lou, Wonderettes
- "Maybe I Know" – Suzy, Wonderettes
- "Needle in a Haystack"– Wonderettes
- "Rescue Me" – Suzy, Wonderettes
- "RESPECT" – Suzy, Wonderettes
- "Thank You and Goodnight"/"Sincerely (Reprise)" – Wonderettes

Keys

- † Not included on the Cast Recording.
- ‡ "Wedding Bell Blues" was placed after "Sugar & Spice Medley" in the original production

=== Cast album ===
An original Off-Broadway cast recording was recorded on September 18, 2008, at Avatar Studios, New York City. The recording features the voices of cast members Beth Malone, Victoria Matlock, Farah Alvin, and Bets Malone. It was produced by Jeffery Lesser, Philip Chaffin, Roger Bean, David Elzer and Peter Schneider.

== Notable casts ==
Character	Milwaukee 1999	Off-Broadway 2008	Off-Broadway Revival 2016
Betty Jean	Laurie Birmingham	Beth Malone	Sally Schwab
Cindy Lou	Jacquelyn Ritz	Victoria Matlock	Jenna Leigh Green
Missy	Becky Spice	Farah Alvin	Christina Bianco
Suzy	Bets Malone Lowe Taylor	Bets Malone Lowe Taylor	Kathy Brier

Notable Off-Broadway Revival Replacements:

- Suzy: Diana DeGarmo, Ryann Redmond
- Missy: Kristy Cates

== Sequels ==
There have been three sequels to The Marvelous Wonderettes. The first, Winter Wonderettes, was presented in November 2003, again at the Milwaukee Repertory Theater. The show includes all four girls and sets them at Harper's Hardware, the store that Betty Jean has worked in since high school. The girls have created a winter wonderland within the store for the 1968 holiday party. The evening includes some favorite holiday songs, including "Rockin' Around the Christmas Tree", "Jingle Bell Rock", "Santa Claus is Comin' to Town", and "Winter Wonderland".

The second sequel, Wonderettes: Caps and Gowns, premiered at the Laguna Playhouse. The first act shows the four characters graduating from Springfield High School and the second shows the wedding reception of Missy and Mr. Lee. The show again uses songs from the 1950s in the first act and the 1960s in the second. The third sequel and final installment of the Wonderettes franchise is titled Marvelous Wonderettes: Dream On. The first act shows the characters performing at their teacher Ms. McPherson's retirement party. The second act shows the girls at the twenty year reunion for the class of '58 where they sing songs from the 1970's.

A large cast version of The Marvelous Wonderettes is licensed at Stage Rights under the title The Marvelous Wonderettes: Glee Club Edition. The show combines the first act from the original show and the first act from Caps and Gowns and uses an ensemble cast as the school's glee club.

== Awards and nominations ==
- 2007 Los Angeles Ovation Awards
  - Franklin R. Levy Award for Musical Intimate Theatre (winner)
  - Ensemble Performance (nomination)
  - Direction of a Musical
    - Roger Bean (nomination)
- 2007 Los Angeles Drama Critics Circle Awards
  - Ensemble Performance (winner)
  - Choreography
    - Janet Miller (winner)
- 2009 Gypsy of the Year Awards
  - Top Fundraising Off-Broadway company (winner)
- 2009 Drama League Awards
  - Distinguished Production of a Musical (nomination)
- 2009 Drama Desk Awards
  - Outstanding Featured Actress in a Musical
    - Farah Alvin (nomination)
