= Marlee Matlin filmography =

Film, television, and theater roles

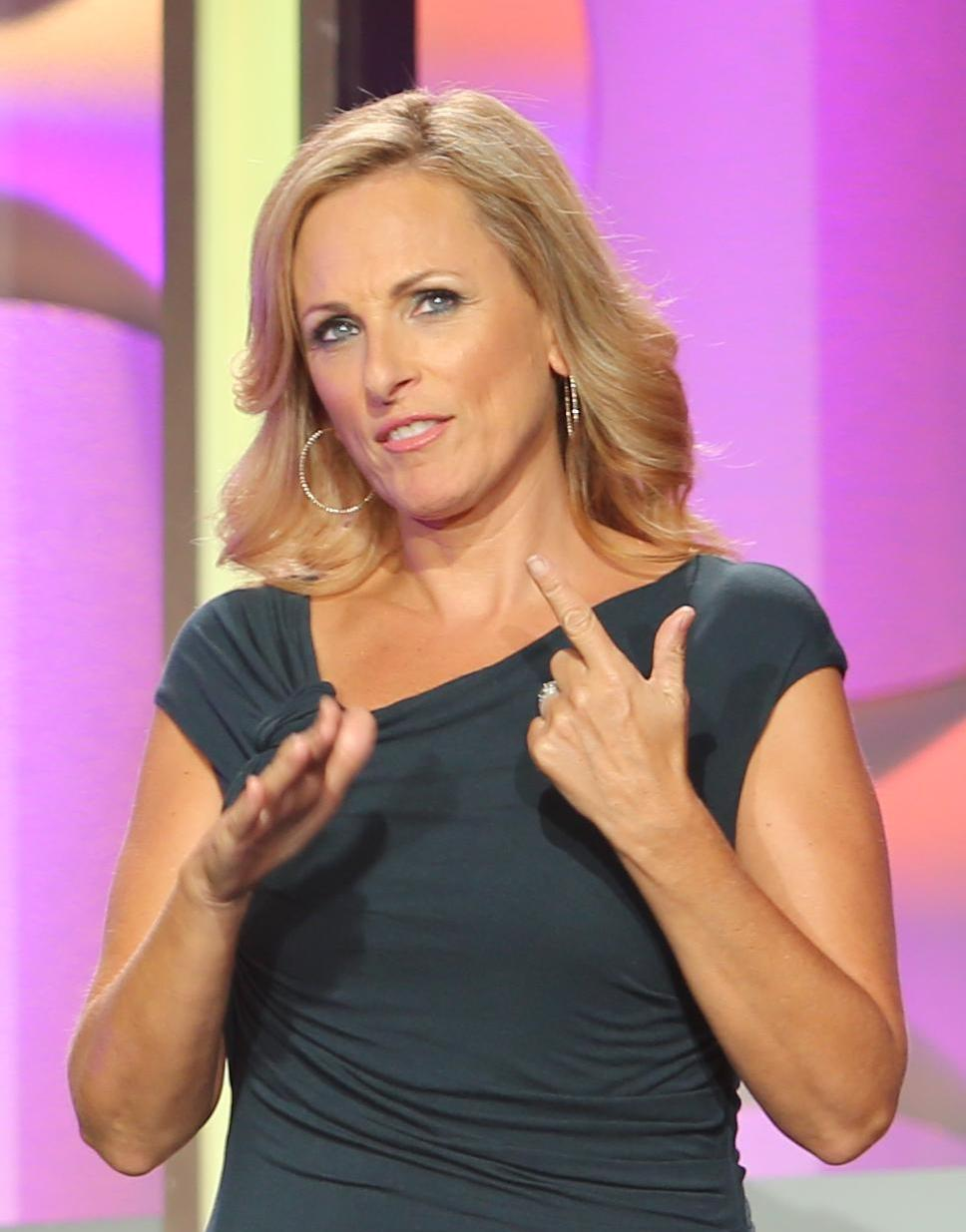
- Matlin at the 2014 AHA Hero Dog Awards
- Occupations: Actress, producer
- Years active: 1986–present

This article lists the film, television, and theater appearances of American actress Marlee Matlin. Matlin, who had previously acted in stage productions, made her screen debut as the female lead in the 1986 film Children of a Lesser God, for which she won a Golden Globe Award for Best Actress in a Motion Picture – Drama and the Academy Award for Best Actress in a Leading Role, becoming the youngest Best Actress winner and the first deaf performer to have won an Academy Award.

Matlin, who is deaf, generally plays deaf characters. However, in 1994 Matlin played a hearing woman in the title role of the television movie Against Her Will: The Carrie Buck Story, based on the true story of Carrie Buck, who was not deaf. Matlin was nominated for a CableACE Award for her performance.

Although Matlin has continued to make occasional film appearances, most of her work has been in television. From 1991 to 1993, she starred in the police drama series Reasonable Doubts as Assistant District Attorney Tess Kaufman, receiving two Golden Globe nominations. She has had recurring roles as Mayor Laurie Bey in Picket Fences (for which she received an Emmy Award nomination), pollster Joey Lucas in The West Wing (appearing on all seven seasons of its run), attorney Ruby Whitlow in My Name Is Earl, gay sculptor Jodi Lerner in The L Word, and guidance counselor Melody Bledsoe in Switched at Birth. Her numerous guest appearances have included Seinfeld, The Practice, and Law & Order: Special Victims Unit, each of which brought her another Emmy nomination.

Matlin has also competed on the game shows Dancing with the Stars and The Celebrity Apprentice. On the April 3, 2011 episode of The Celebrity Apprentice, Matlin raised $986,000 for her charity, the Starkey Hearing Foundation, setting a record for the most funds raised for charity in a single event on any television show. The show's production company then donated an additional $14,000 to bring the contribution to one million dollars.

== Filmography ==
=== Film ===
Year	Title	Role	Notes
1986	Children of a Lesser God	Sarah Norman	Won – Academy Award for Best Actress
1987	Walker	Ellen Martin	
1991	The Linguini Incident	Jeanette	
1991	L'Homme au masque d'or	María	
1992	The Player	Herself	
1993	Hear No Evil	Jillian Shanahan	
1996	It's My Party	Daphne Stark	
1996	Snitch	Cindy	
1999	Two Shades of Blue	Beth McDaniels	
1999	In Her Defense	Jane Claire	
1999	When Justice Fails	Katy Wesson	
2001	Askari	Paula McKinley	
2004	What the Bleep Do We Know!?	Amanda	
2005	Baby Einstein: Baby Wordsworth	ASL Instructor/Herself	Video
2006	Baby Einstein: Baby's Favorite Places	ASL Instructor/Herself	Video
2007	Baby Einstein: My First Signs	ASL Instructor/Herself	Video
2012	Excision	Amber	
2013	4Closed	Ally Turner	Video
2013	No Ordinary Hero: The SuperDeafy Movie	Herself	
2014	Some Kind of Beautiful	Cindy	
2019	Multiverse	Dierdre	Also known as Entangled
2021	CODA	Jackie Rossi	
2025	Marlee Matlin: Not Alone Anymore	Herself	Documentary

=== Television ===
Year	Title	Role	Notes
1988	Sesame Street	Herself	1 episode
1989	Bridge to Silence	Peggy Lawrence	TV movie
1991–1993	Reasonable Doubts	Tess Kaufman	44 episodes
1993	Seinfeld	Laura	Episode: "The Lip Reader"
1993–1996	Picket Fences	Laurie Bey	14 episodes
1994	Adventures in Wonderland	April Hare	Episode: "The Sound and the Furry"
1994	Against Her Will: The Carrie Buck Story	Carrie Buck	TV movie
1995	Sweet Justice	Brianna Holland	Episode: "Pledges"
1995	The Outer Limits	Jennifer Winter	Episode: "The Message"
1997	Dead Silence	Melanie Charrol	TV movie
1997	The Larry Sanders Show	Herself	Episode: "The Book"
1997	Spin City	Sarah Edelman	Episode: "Deaf Becomes Her"
1998	The Puzzle Place	Herself	Episode: "I'm Talking to You"
1999	Freak City	Cassandra	TV movie
1999	ER	SL Instructor	Episode: "Storm: Part 1"
1999	Where the Truth Lies	Dana Sue Lacey	TV movie, also executive producer
1999	Chicken Soup for the Soul	Teacher	Episode: "The Perfect Dog"
1999	Judging Amy	Eliza Spears	Episode: "An Impartial Bias"
2000–2006	The West Wing	Joey Lucas	17 episodes
2000	The Practice	Sally Berg	Episode: "Life Sentence"
2001	Gideon's Crossing	Lindsay Warren	Episode: "Orphans"
2001	Kiss My Act	Casey	TV movie
2002–2003	Blue's Clues	Herself as a librarian	2 episodes
2003	The Division	Ann Polton	Episode: "Testimonial"
2003	Eddie's Million Dollar Cook-Off	None	TV movie, executive producer
2004	Extreme Makeover: Home Edition	Guest star	Episode: "The Vardon Family"
2004–2005	Law & Order: Special Victims Unit	Dr. Amy Solwey	2 episodes
2005	Desperate Housewives	Alisa Stevens	Episode: "There Won't Be Trumpets"
2006	CSI: NY	Gina Mitchum	Episode: "Silent Night"
2006	Extreme Makeover: Home Edition	Guest host	Episode: "The Llanes Family"
2006–2007	My Name Is Earl	Ruby Whitlow	3 episodes
2007–2009	The L Word	Jodi Lerner	29 episodes
2008	Dancing with the Stars	Herself	6 episodes
2008	Nip/Tuck	Barbara Shapiro	Episode: "Magda & Jeff"
2008	Sweet Nothing in My Ear	Laura Miller	TV movie
2009	Seth & Alex's Comedy Show	Herself	TV short
2010	Extreme Makeover: Home Edition	Guest star	Episode: "Oregon School for the Deaf"
2011–2012	The Celebrity Apprentice	Herself	13 episodes
2011	Comedy Central Roast of Donald Trump	Herself	TV movie
2011	CSI: Crime Scene Investigation	Prof. Julia Holden	Episode: "The Two Mrs. Grissoms"
2011–2017	Switched at Birth	Melody Bledsoe	45 episodes
2012–2021	Family Guy	Stella (voice)	7 episodes
2013	Celebrity Ghost Stories	Herself	Episode: 5x13
2014	Glee	Herself	Episode: "City of Angels"
2014	Cosmos: A Spacetime Odyssey	Annie Jump Cannon	Voice role, episode: "Sisters of the Sun"
2016	Code Black	Kathy Byrne	Episode: "Ave Maria"
2017	Battle of the Network Stars	Herself	Episode: "White House vs. Lawyers"
2017	Hollywood Medium with Tyler Henry	Herself	Episode: "Janice Dickinson/Joanna Krupa/Marlee Matlin"
2017–2019	The Magicians	Harriet	Guest, 8 episodes
2018	Quantico	Jocelyn Turner	Series regular
2018	Gone	Ms. Finley	Episode: "Romans"
2019	Limetown	Deirdre Wells	3 episodes
2022	Blue's Clues & You!	Herself (Video Letter)	1 episode
2022	New Amsterdam	Dr. Bev Clemons	Episode: “Don’t Do This To Me”
2023	Hell's Kitchen	Herself	Guest diner; Episode: "Lights, Camera, Sabotage!"

=== Theater ===
Year	Title	Role	Notes
1985	Children of a Lesser God	Lydia	Chicago
2015	Spring Awakening	Adult Women	Broadway (Deaf West Theater)

== See also ==
- List of awards and nominations received by Marlee Matlin
- List of Academy Award records
- List of oldest and youngest Academy Award winners and nominees – Youngest winners for Best Actress in a Leading Role
- List of oldest and youngest Academy Award winners and nominees – Youngest nominees for Best Actress in a Leading Role
- List of Jewish Academy Award winners and nominees
- List of actors with Academy Award nominations
