= Phyllis Frelich =

American actress

- Publicity Photo of Phyllis Frelich
- Born: Phyllis Annetta Frelich; February 29, 1944; Devils Lake, North Dakota, U.S.
- Died: April 10, 2014 (aged 70); Temple City, California, U.S.
- Occupation: Actress
- Years active: 1970–2011

Phyllis Annetta Frelich (February 29, 1944 – April 10, 2014) was a deaf American actress. She was the first deaf actor to win a Tony Award.

== Early life ==
Frelich was born to deaf parents Esther (née Dockter) and Philip Frelich. She was one of nine siblings. She and her parents were alumni of the North Dakota School for the Deaf. At Gallaudet University she completed a degree in library science, but also participated in theater. It was there that she was seen performing by David Hays, one of the founders of the National Theater of the Deaf, who asked her to join the theater company.

== Career ==
Frelich originated the leading female role in the Broadway production of Children of a Lesser God, written by Mark Medoff. That play was specially written for her, and based to some extent on her relationship with her husband Robert Steinberg. Children won the Tony for Best Play; Frelich won the 1980 Best Actress Tony Award and her co-star, John Rubinstein, won the Best Actor Tony Award. Frelich was the first deaf actor or actress to win a Tony Award. Marlee Matlin played Frelich's role in the film version, for which she won the Academy Award for Best Actress. Frelich later starred in other plays written by Medoff, including The Hands of Its Enemy and Prymate. She was nominated for an Emmy Award for her performance in the 1985 television movie Love Is Never Silent. On the original air date of February 9, 1985, she appeared as a guest in the Gimme a Break! episode "The Earthquake". Frelich appeared in the recurring role of Sister Sarah on Santa Barbara. Her last acting role was in an episode of CSI: Crime Scene Investigation in 2011, where her co-star, Marlee Matlin, played her surrogate daughter.

Frelich was named to the North Dakota Rough Riders Hall of Fame in 1981.

Frelich was elected to the ninety-member Screen Actors Guild (SAG) Board in Hollywood, the highest policy-making body in the entertainment industry, in 1991. She was the first deaf actress to be recognized in the United States.

In 1991, Frelich starred with Patrick Graybill in The Gin Game at the Deaf West Theatre in Los Angeles drawing critical acclaim on their aesthetic art of American Sign Language. This performance was adapted from D. L. Coburn's play and was directed by Linda Bove, with Deaf West Theatre artistic director Ed Waterstreet.

== Death ==
Frelich died on April 10, 2014, at her home in Temple City, California at the age of 70 from progressive supranuclear palsy (PSP), a rare degenerative neurological disease for which there are no treatments.

== Filmography ==
=== Film ===
| Year | Title | Role | Notes |
|---|---|---|---|
| 1992 | Judgement | District Attorney | |
| 1997 | Santa Fe | Dr. Joyce Ginsberg | |
| 2002 | Children on Their Birthdays | Mrs. Bobbit | |

=== Television ===
| Year | Title | Role | Notes |
|---|---|---|---|
| 1981 | Barney Miller | Madeline Schaefer | Episode: "Stormy Weather" |
| 1985 | Gimme a Break! | Martha | Episode: "Earthquake" |
| 1985 | Love Is Never Silent | Janice Ryder | TV movie |
| 1986 | Spenser: For Hire | Joan Cugell | Episode: "When Silence Speaks" |
| 1987 | Santa Barbara | Sister Sarah | Recurring role, 31 episodes |
| 1989 | Bridge to Silence | Amanda Wingfield | TV movie |
| 1991 | Hunter | Barbara Collins | Episode: "Cries of Silence" |
| 1992 | L.A. Law | Suzanne Bidwell | Episode: "My Friend Flicker" |
| 1998 | Pacific Blue | Helena | Episode: "Broken Dreams" |
| 1998–1999 | ER | Dr. Lisa Parks | 2 episodes |
| 1999 | Diagnosis: Murder | Frances Lamar | Episode: "Today Is the Last Day of the Rest of My Life" |
| 2004 | Sue Thomas: F.B.Eye | Helga | Episode: "The Holocaust Survivor" |
| 2008 | Sweet Nothing in My Ear | Sally | TV movie |
| 2011 | CSI: Crime Scene Investigation | Mrs. Betty Grissom | Episode: "The Two Mrs. Grissoms", (final appearance) |
