= Deaf West Theatre =

Sign-language theater in Los Angeles, California, US

Deaf West Theatre is a non-profit arts organization based in Los Angeles, California, US. It is most well known for its Tony Award-nominated productions of Big River and Spring Awakening.

Deaf West Theatre is led by artistic director DJ Kurs.

== History ==
Established in 1991 by Founding Artistic Directors, Ed Waterstreet and Linda Bove, Deaf West Theatre engages artists and audiences in unparalleled theater experiences inspired by Deaf culture and the expressive power of sign language. Committed to innovation, collaboration, and training, Deaf West Theatre is the artistic bridge between the deaf and hearing worlds. Deaf West productions are traditionally performed in American Sign Language with voice translation occurring at the same time so it is accessible to both deaf and hearing audiences. Deaf West has also held workshops for deaf youth who come from underprivileged communities and supported young deaf individuals who have a career in the arts. Since 2012, Deaf West has been led by Artistic Director DJ Kurs.

Deaf actors who have worked with Deaf West Theatre include Troy Kotsur, Phyllis Frelich, Daniel Durant, Marlee Matlin, and Alexandria Wailes.

== Productions ==
Notable past productions include Our Town by Thornton Wilder in a co-production with Pasadena Playhouse; Edward Albee's At Home at the Zoo in a co-production with The Wallis Annenberg Center for the Performing Arts; Spring Awakening, which transferred from Inner-City Arts to The Wallis Annenberg and then to Broadway where it received three Tony Award nominations, including Best Revival; American Buffalo, which was labeled a Los Angeles Times Critic's Choice; Cyrano, a co-production with the Fountain Theatre which received the Los Angeles Drama Critics Circle Award for Outstanding Production; Big River which received two Tony Award nominations (including Best Revival), Pippin, produced at the Mark Taper Forum in a co-production with Center Theatre Group; Oliver! which received the Ovation Award for Best Musical, and A Streetcar Named Desire which received the Ovation Award for Best Play.

== Awards and nominations ==
Year	Award	Production	Category	Nominee	Result
2021	Ovation Awards	The Solid Life of Sugar Water	Best Production of a Play (Intimate Theatre)		Nominated
2021	Ovation Awards	The Solid Life of Sugar Water	Scenic Design (Intimate Theatre)	Sean Fanning	Nominated
2016	Tony Awards	Spring Awakening	Best Revival of a Musical		Nominated
2016	Tony Awards	Spring Awakening	Best Direction of a Musical	Michael Arden	Nominated
2016	Tony Awards	Spring Awakening	Best Lighting Design of a Musical	Ben Stanton	Nominated
2015	Ovation Awards	Spring Awakening	Best Production of a Musical (Intimate Theater)		Won
2015	Ovation Awards	Spring Awakening	Best Production of a Musical (Large Theater)		Won
2015	Ovation Awards	Spring Awakening	Acting Ensemble of a Musical		Won
2015	Ovation Awards	Spring Awakening	Director of a Musical	Michael Arden	Won
2015	Ovation Awards	Spring Awakening	Choreography	Spencer Liff	Won
2015	Ovation Awards	Spring Awakening	Lighting Design (Large Theater)	Ben Stanton	Won
2015	Ovation Awards	Spring Awakening	Lead Actor in a Musical	Austin P. McKenzie	Nominated
2015	Ovation Awards	Spring Awakening	Lead Actress in a Musical	Sandra Mae Frank	Nominated
2015	Ovation Awards	Spring Awakening	Featured Actor in a Musical	Andy Mientus	Nominated
2015	Ovation Awards	Spring Awakening	Featured Actress in a Musical	Krysta Rodriguez	Nominated
2015	Ovation Awards	Spring Awakening	Music Direction	Jared Stein	Nominated
2015	Ovation Awards	Spring Awakening	Lighting Design (Intimate Theater)	Travis Hagenbuch	Nominated
2015	Ovation Awards	Spring Awakening	Scenic Design (Large Theater)	Dane Laffrey	Nominated
2015	Ovation Awards	Spring Awakening	Sound Design (Intimate Theater)	Phillip Allen	Nominated
2015	Ovation Awards	Spring Awakening	Video/Projection Design	Lucy Mackinnon	Nominated
2012	LA Drama Critics Circle Awards	Cyrano	Best Play		Won
2012	LA Drama Critics Circle Awards	Cyrano	Best Actor	Troy Kotsur	Won
2010	LA Weekly Theater Awards	Children of a Lesser God	Leading Female Performance	Shoshannah Stern	Nominated
2010	LA Weekly Theater Awards	Children of a Lesser God	Best Ensemble		Nominated
2008	BackStage West Garland Awards	Sleeping Beauty Wakes	Best Production		Nominated
2008	BackStage West Garland Awards	Sleeping Beauty Wakes	Choreography	Jeff Calhoun	Nominated
2008	BackStage West Garland Awards	Sleeping Beauty Wakes	Sound Design	Eric Snodgrass	Nominated
2007	Ovation Awards	Sleeping Beauty Wakes	Best World Premiere Musical		Won
2007	Ovation Awards	Sleeping Beauty Wakes	Best Musical Direction	Brendan Milburn	Won
2006	Helen Hayes Awards	Big River	Outstanding Musical Direction	Nick DeGregorio	Nominated
2006	Helen Hayes Awards	Big River	Outstanding Director	Jeff Calhoun	Nominated
2006	Helen Hayes Awards	Big River	Outstanding Lead Actor	Christopher B. Corrigan	Nominated
2006	Helen Hayes Awards	Big River	Outstanding Lead Actor	Michael McElroy	Nominated
2006	Helen Hayes Awards	Big River	Outstanding Lead Actor	Bill O'Brien	Nominated
2006	Helen Hayes Awards	Big River	Outstanding Resident Musical		Nominated
2005	Ovation Awards	Big River	Best Production of a Musical (Intimate Theater)		Won
2005	Ovation Awards	Big River	Director of a Musical	Jeff Calhoun	Won
2005	Ovation Awards	Big River	Choreography	Jeff Calhoun	Won
2005	Ovation Awards	Big River	Musical Direction	Steven Landau	Won
2005	Ovation Awards	Big River	Scenic Design (Intimate Theater)	Ray Klausen	Won
2005	Ovation Awards	Big River	Lighting Design (Intimate Theater)	Michael Gilliam	Won
2005	Ovation Awards	Big River	Best Touring Production		Won
2005	Independent Reviewers of New England	Big River	Special Citation for Landmark Revival		Won
2005	Independent Reviewers of New England	Big River	Best Sound Design, Large Company	Peter Fitzgerald	Won
2005	Independent Reviewers of New England	Big River	Best Set Design, Large Company	Ray Klausen	Nominated
2005	Independent Reviewers of New England	Big River	Best Lighting Design, Large Company	Michael Gilliam	Nominated
2005	Independent Reviewers of New England	Big River	Best Actor, Large Company	Daniel Jenkins	Nominated
2005	Independent Reviewers of New England	Big River	Best Actor, Large Company	Michael McElroy	Nominated
2005	Denver Post Ovation Awards	Big River	Best Touring Production		Won
2005	Denver Post Ovation Awards	Big River	Best Actor	Tyrone Giordano	Won
2005	Denver Post Ovation Awards	Big River	Best Actor	Daniel Jenkins	Nominated
2005	Denver Post Ovation Awards	Big River	Best Supporting Actor	David Aron Dumane	Won
2005	Denver Post Ovation Awards	Big River	Best Supporting Actor	Kia Glover	Nominated
2005	LA Drama Critics Circle Awards	Big River	Best Production		Won
2005	SFBA Theatre Critics Circle	Big River	Best Musical (Touring)		Nominated
2004	Tony Awards	Big River	Honor for Excellence	Broadway cast of Big River	Won
2004	Tony Awards	Big River	Best Revival of a Musical		Nominated
2004	Tony Awards	Big River	Best Featured Actor in a Musical	Michael McElroy	Nominated
2004	Drama Desk Awards	Big River	Outstanding Revival of a Musical		Nominated
2004	Drama Desk Awards	Big River	Outstanding Actor in a Musical	Michael McElroy	Nominated
2004	Drama Desk Awards	Big River	Outstanding Actor in a Musical	Tyrone Giordano	Nominated
2004	Drama Desk Awards	Big River	Outstanding Director of a Musical	Jeff Calhoun	Nominated
2004	Drama League	Big River	Distinguished Production of a Revival		Nominated
2002	Ovation Awards	Big River	Best Production		Won
2002	Ovation Awards	Big River	Best Director	Jeff Calhoun	Won
2002	Ovation Awards	Big River	Best Choreographer	Jeff Calhoun	Won
2002	Ovation Awards	Big River	Best Musical Director	Steven Landau	Won
2002	Ovation Awards	Big River	Best Set Design	Ray Klausen	Won
2002	Ovation Awards	Big River	Best Lighting Design	Michael Gilliam	Won
2002	Ovation Awards	Big River	Best Lead Actor	Bill O'Brien	Nominated
2002	Ovation Awards	Big River	Best Lead Actor	James Black	Nominated
2002	Ovation Awards	Big River	Best Featured Actor	Troy Kotsur	Nominated
2002	Ovation Awards	Big River	Best Costume Design	David Zyla	Nominated
2002	Ovation Awards	Big River	Best Sound Design	Bill O'Brien	Nominated
2002	Valley Theatre League	Big River	Best Musical		Won
2002	Valley Theatre League	Big River	Best Director	Jeff Calhoun	Won
2002	Valley Theatre League	Big River	Best Choreographer	Jeff Calhoun	Won
2002	Valley Theatre League	Big River	Best Musical Director	Steven Landau	Won
2002	Valley Theatre League	Big River	Best Actor	Tyrone Giordano	Won
2002	Valley Theatre League	Big River	Best Supporting Actor	Troy Kotsur	Won
2002	Valley Theatre League	Big River	Best Actress	Melissa van der Schyff	Won
2002	Valley Theatre League	Big River	Best Supporting Actress	Deanne Bray	Won
2002	Valley Theatre League	True West	Best Revival Drama		Nominated
2002	Valley Theatre League	True West	Best Actor	Troy Kotsur	Nominated
2002	Valley Theatre League	True West	Best Actor	Bill O'Brien	Nominated
2001	LA Weekly Theatre Awards	Big River	Best Director of a Musical	Jeff Calhoun	Won
2001	LA Weekly Theatre Awards	Big River	Best Musical		Nominated
2001	LA Weekly Theatre Awards	Big River	Best Musical Ensemble		Nominated
2001	LA Drama Critics Circle Awards	Big River	Best Production		Won
2001	LA Drama Critics Circle Awards	Big River	Best Director	Jeff Calhoun	Won
2001	LA Drama Critics Circle Awards	Big River	Best Musical Director	Steven Landau	Won
2001	LA Drama Critics Circle Awards	Big River	Best Set Design	Ray Klausen	Won
2001	LA Drama Critics Circle Awards	Big River	Best Choreography	Jeff Calhoun	Won
2001	LA Drama Critics Circle Awards	Big River	Best Adaptation		Nominated
2001	Backstage West Garland Awards	Big River	Best Musical		Won
2001	Backstage West Garland Awards	Big River	Best Director of a Musical	Jeff Calhoun	Won
2001	Backstage West Garland Awards	Big River	Best Musical Direction	Steven Landau	Won
2001	Backstage West Garland Awards	Big River	Best Actor	Bill O'Brien	Won
2001	Backstage West Garland Awards	Big River	Best Actor	Tyrone Giordano	Won
2001	Backstage West Garland Awards	Big River	Best Set Design	Ray Klausen	Won
2001	Entertainment Today; Ticketholder Awards	Big River	Outstanding Production		Won
2001	Entertainment Today; Ticketholder Awards	Big River	Best New Discovery	Tyrone Giordano	Won
2001	Entertainment Today; Ticketholder Awards	Big River	Best Supporting Actor	Troy Kotsur	Nominated
2001	Entertainment Today; Ticketholder Awards	Big River	Best Supporting Actor	Lyle Kanouse	Nominated
2001	Entertainment Today; Ticketholder Awards	Big River	Best Director	Jeff Calhoun	Nominated
2001	Entertainment Today; Ticketholder Awards	Big River	Best Ensemble Cast		Nominated
2001	Robby Awards	Big River	Best Director	Jeff Calhoun	Nominated
2001	Robby Awards	Big River	Best Actor	Tyrone Giordano	Nominated
2001	Robby Awards	Big River	Best Set Design	Ray Klausen	Nominated
2001	Robby Awards	Road to Revolution	Best Drama		Nominated
2001	Robby Awards	Road to Revolution	Best Actress	Phyllis Frelich	Nominated
2001	Robby Awards	Road to Revolution	Best Actress	Deanne Bray	Nominated
2001	Robby Awards	Road to Revolution	Best Playwright	Mark Medoff	Nominated
2001	Robby Awards	Road to Revolution	Best Director	Mark Medoff	Nominated
2001	Robby Awards	Road to Revolution	Best Lighting Design	Steven Wallace	Nominated
2001	Valley Theatre League	Road to Revolution	Best Actress	Phyllis Frelich	Won
2001	Valley Theatre League	Road to Revolution	Best Stage Manager	Meredith Greenburg	Won
2000	Ovation Awards	Oliver!	Best Musical		Won
2000	Ovation Awards	Oliver!	Best Director	Jeff Calhoun	Won
2000	Ovation Awards	Oliver!	Best Choreographer	Brian-Paul Mendoza	Won
2000	Ovation Awards	Oliver!	Best Adaptation/Translation		Nominated
2000	Ovation Awards	Oliver!	Best Actor	George McDaniel	Nominated
2000	Ovation Awards	Oliver!	Best Featured Actor	Harris Doran	Nominated
2000	Ovation Awards	Oliver!	Best Featured Actor	Troy Kotsur	Nominated
2000	Ovation Awards	Oliver!	Best Featured Actress	Antoinette Abbamonte	Nominated
2000	Ovation Awards	Oliver!	Best Featured Actress	Carol Kline	Nominated
2000	Ovation Awards	Oliver!	Best Lighting Design	Michael Gilliam	Nominated
2000	Ovation Awards	A Streetcar; Named Desire	Best Director	Deborah LaVine	Nominated
2000	Ovation Awards	A Streetcar; Named Desire	Best Actress	Suanne Spoke	Nominated
2000	Ovation Awards	A Streetcar; Named Desire	Best Set Design	Robert Steinberg	Nominated
2000	Ovation Awards	A Streetcar; Named Desire	Best Lighting Design	Ken Booth	Nominated
2000	Ovation Awards	A Streetcar; Named Desire	Best Sound Design	Bill O'Brien	Nominated
2000	Ovation Awards	A Streetcar; Named Desire	Best Play		Won
2000	Ovation Awards	A Streetcar; Named Desire	Best Adaptation/Translation		Won
2000	LA Weekly Theatre Awards	A Streetcar; Named Desire	Best Actress	Suanne Spoke	Nominated
2000	LA Weekly Theatre Awards	A Streetcar; Named Desire	Best Set Design	Robert Steinberg	Nominated
2000	Valley Theatre League	A Streetcar; Named Desire	Best Revival Drama		Won
2000	Valley Theatre League	A Streetcar; Named Desire	Best Actor in a Drama	Troy Kotsur	Won
2000	Valley Theatre League	A Streetcar; Named Desire	Best Actress in a Drama	Suanne Spoke	Won
2000	Valley Theatre League	A Streetcar; Named Desire	Best Director	Deborah LaVine	Won
2000	Valley Theatre League	A Streetcar; Named Desire	Best Set Design	Robert Steinberg	Won
2000	Valley Theatre League	Oliver!	Best Musical		Won
2000	Valley Theatre League	Oliver!	Best Director of a Musical	Jeff Calhoun	Won
