= Shoshannah Stern =

American actress

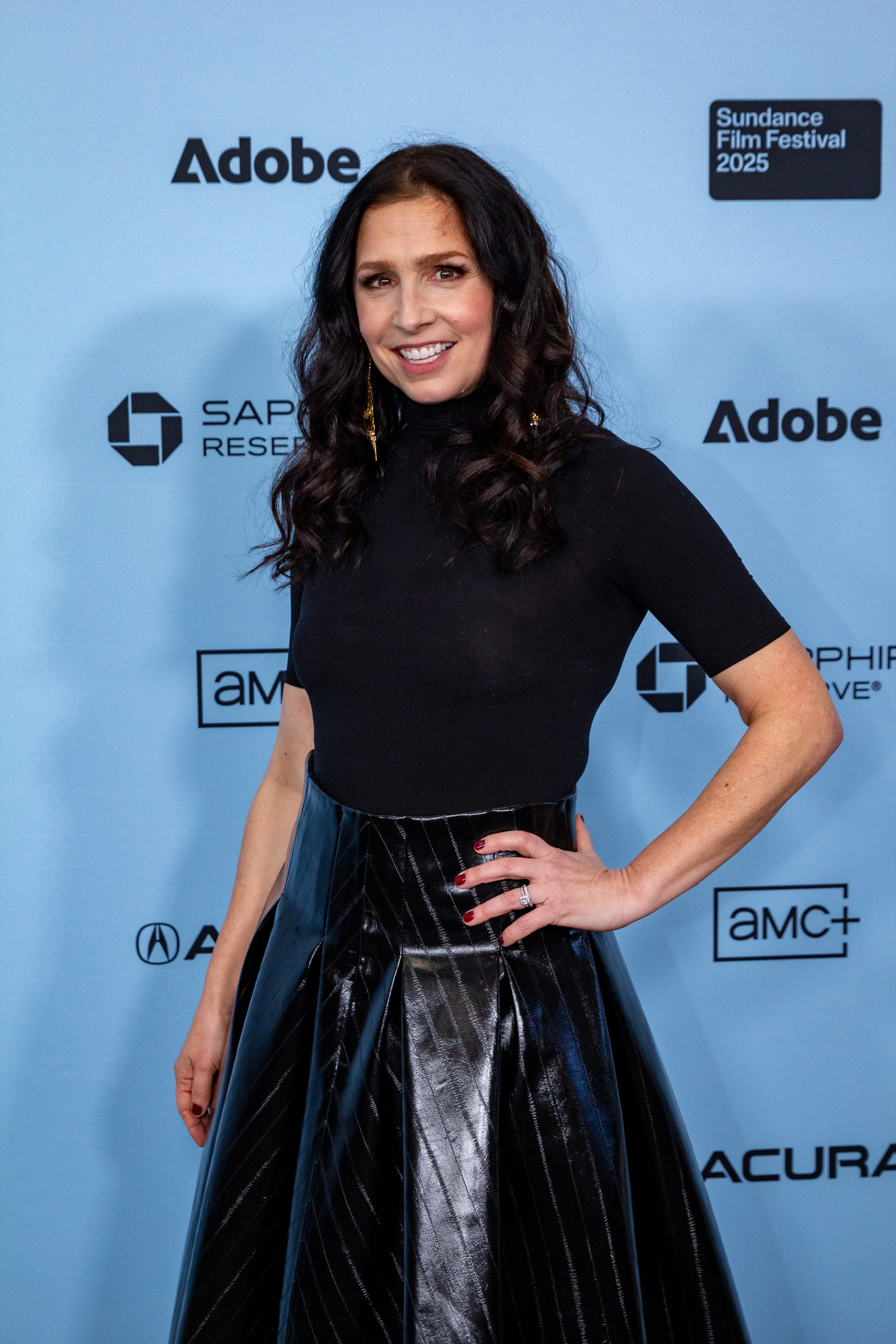
- Stern at the 2025 Sundance Film Festival
- Born: Walnut Creek, California, U.S.
- Occupations: Actress, writer
- Relatives: Louise Stern (sister)

Shoshannah Stern is an American actress and writer.

== Life and career ==
She was born in Walnut Creek, California, into an observant Jewish and fourth-generation deaf family, the daughter of Ron Stern and Hedy Marilyn Stern (née Udkovich), and the sister of writer and artist Louise Stern and former Gallaudet men's basketball coach and current political scientist Brendan Stern.

Stern got her first regular series role as Holly Brodeen, a member of an elite government anti-terrorist task force in ABC's Threat Matrix. The role was created for her by the show's producers after a director who had worked with her on The Division recommended her. She had a recurring role in Showtime's Weeds (as Megan Beals-Botwin) and was also on ER, Providence and Cold Case. She played Bonnie Richmond in the CBS post-apocalyptic drama Jericho. She had a recurring role in Season 3 of Fox's Lie to Me.

Stern appeared with Matthew Broderick in the film The Last Shot and starred in the film Adventures of Power. She also appeared in the popular music video "Yes We Can", written by will.i.am for the Barack Obama campaign.

Her 2020 role on Grey's Anatomy is the first recurring deaf doctor role on a prime time television network show.

She also played the recurring character Eileen Leahy on the CW show Supernatural.

She is also set to write the episode "Tuklo" of the Hawkeye spin-off series Echo, set in the Marvel Cinematic Universe starring Alaqua Cox.

In 2025, Stern made her directorial debut with Marlee Matlin: Not Alone Anymore, a documentary revolving around actress Marlee Matlin, which will have its world premiere at the 2025 Sundance Film Festival.

== Filmography ==
=== Film ===
Year	Title	Role	Notes
1999	The Auteur Theory	Founders' Day girl	
2003	Justice	First patron	
2004	The Last Shot	Steven's girlfriend	
2008	Adventures of Power	Annie	
2010	The Hammer	Kristi Jones	
2023	Under the Boardwalk	Shelly	Voice
2023	The Magnificent Meyersons	Susie Meyerson	
2025	Marlee Matlin: Not Alone Anymore	—N/a	Director, producer

=== Television ===
Year	Title	Role	Notes
2002	Off Centre	Rebecca	Episode: "Hear No Evil, See No Package"
2002	Providence	Renee	Episode: "Great Expectations"
2002	Boston Public		Episode: "Chapter Fifty"
2003	ER	Rosemary	Episode: "A Little Help From My Friends"
2003	The Division		Episode: "Testimonial"
2003–2004	Threat Matrix	Holly Brodeen	Series regular (6 episodes)
2005–2006, 2012	Weeds	Megan Beals	Main role (14 episodes)
2006–2008	Jericho	Bonnie Richmond	Main role (18 episodes)
2008	Cold Case	Leah O'Rafferty	Episode: "Andy in C Minor"
2008	Sweet Nothing in My Ear	Valerie Park	TV film
2010–2011	Lie to Me	Sarah	3 episodes
2015–2018	Another Period	Helen Keller	2 episodes
2016–2020	Supernatural	Eileen Leahy	Recurring role (7 episodes)
2017	Fridays	Kate	
2018–2019	This Close	Kate	Main role (14 episodes) (also co-creator)
2020	Grey's Anatomy	Dr. Lauren Riley	2 episodes
2024	Echo	—N/a	Writer (1 episode); Disney+ series

== Stage ==
=== Deaf West Theatre ===
- Open Window .... Susan (directed by Eric Simonson)
- Children of a Lesser God .... Sarah (directed by Joe Giamalva)

=== California School for the Deaf Theatre Program ===
- Romeo and Juliet .... Juliet (directed by Julianna Fjeld)
- Aladdin .... Dancer (directed by CJ Jones)
- The Cat and the Canary .... Annabelle (directed by CJ Jones)
- A Funny Thing Happened on the Way to the Forum .... Gymnasia (directed by CJ Jones)
- Anne of Green Gables .... Anne (directed by Charles Katz)
