= List of awards and nominations received by Marlee Matlin =

Marlee Matlin awards
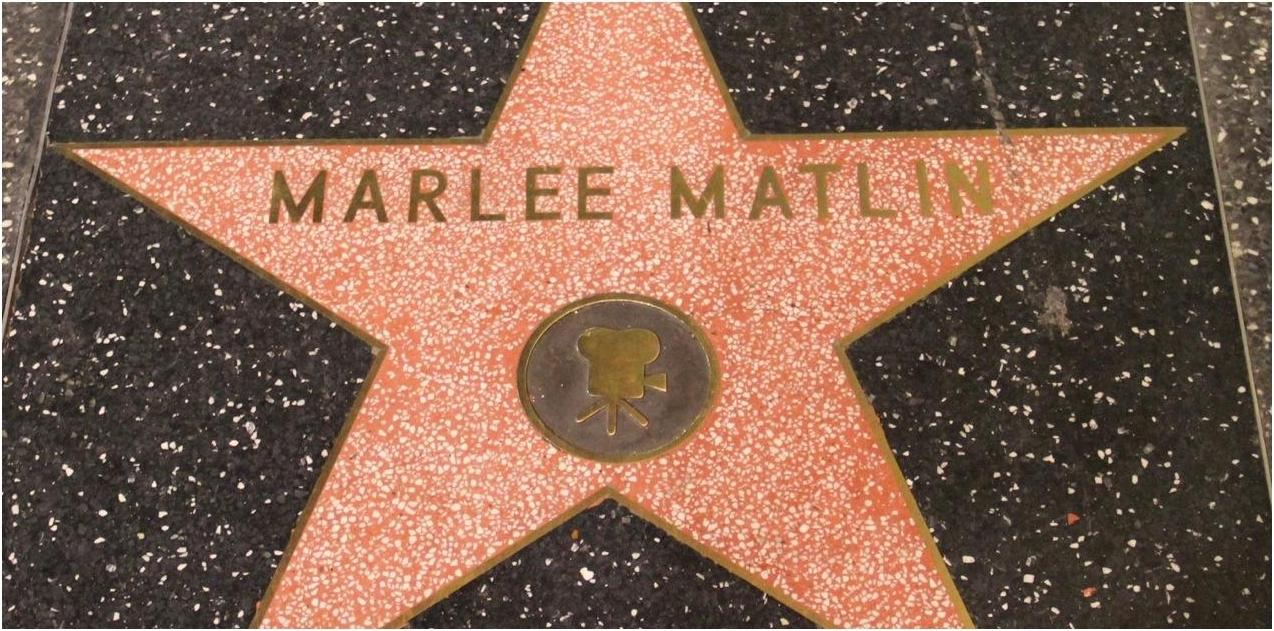
- Matlin's star at the Hollywood Walk of Fame in Los Angeles, California
Totals
| Award | Wins | Nominations |
| Academy Awards | 1 | 1 |
| CableACE Awards | 0 | 1 |
| Emmy Awards | 0 | 4 |
| Gallaudet University Awards | 1 | 1 |
| Golden Globes | 1 | 3 |
| Hollywood; Walk of Fame | 1 | 1 |
| Jefferson Awards | 1 | 1 |
| LAFCA Awards | 0 | 1 |
| OFTA Awards | 0 | 2 |
| People's Choice Awards | 0 | 2 |
| SAG Awards | 1 | 2 |
| UFCA Awards | 1 | 1 |
| VQT Awards | 0 | 3 |
| Awards won | 8 |
| Nominations | 26 |

American actress Marlee Matlin won a Golden Globe Award for Best Actress in a Motion Picture – Drama as well as the Academy Award for Best Actress in a Leading Role, for her screen debut in the 1986 romantic drama film Children of a Lesser God. At age 21, she is the youngest Best Actress winner and was the first deaf performer to win an Academy Award. Since then, Matlin, who is deaf, has received a number of awards and nominations for her acting work, including two additional Golden Globe nominations and four Emmy Award nominations for her television appearances. In 2009, she received a star on the Hollywood Walk of Fame.

Matlin has also received honors for her public service on behalf of the deaf, including a national Jefferson Award in 1988. Gallaudet University, a private university that focuses on educating deaf and hard of hearing persons, awarded her an honorary doctorate in 1987.

== Awards and nominations ==
- Academy Awards

| Year | Nominated work | Category | Result |
|---|---|---|---|
| 1986 | Children of a Lesser God | Best Actress | Won |

- CableACE Awards

| Year | Nominated work | Category | Result |
|---|---|---|---|
| 1995 | Against Her Will: The Carrie Buck Story | Actress in a Movie or Miniseries | Nominated |

- Gallaudet University Awards

| Year | Nominated work | Category | Result |
|---|---|---|---|
| 1987 | Herself | Honorary Doctorate of Humane Letters | Honored |

- Golden Globe Awards

| Year | Nominated work | Category | Result |
|---|---|---|---|
| 1986 | Children of a Lesser God | Best Actress in a Motion Picture – Drama | Won |
| 1991 | Reasonable Doubts | Best Actress in a Television Series – Drama | Nominated |
| 1992 | Reasonable Doubts | Best Actress in a Television Series – Drama | Nominated |

- Gotham Independent Film Awards

| Year | Nominated work | Category | Result |
|---|---|---|---|
| 2021 | CODA | Outstanding Supporting Performance | Nominated |

- Henry Viscardi Achievement Awards

| Year | Nominated work | Category | Result |
|---|---|---|---|
| 2014 | - | Henry Viscardi Achievement Awards | Won |

- Hollywood Critics Association Film Awards

| Year | Nominated work | Category | Result |
|---|---|---|---|
| 2022 | CODA | Best Supporting Actress | Nominated |

- Hollywood Walk of Fame

| Year | Nominated work | Category | Result |
|---|---|---|---|
| 2009 | — | Motion Picture Star | Honored |

- Jefferson Awards

| Year | Nominated work | Category | Result |
|---|---|---|---|
| 1988 | Herself | Samuel S. Beard Award for Greatest Public Service by an Individual 35 Years or Under | Won |

- Los Angeles Film Critics Association Awards

| Year | Nominated work | Category | Result |
|---|---|---|---|
| 1986 | Children of a Lesser God | Best Actress | Runner-up |

- Online Film Critics Association Awards

| Year | Nominated work | Category | Result |
|---|---|---|---|
| 2000 | The Practice | Best Guest Actress in a Drama Series | Nominated |
| 2000 | The West Wing | Best Guest Actress in a Drama Series | Nominated |

- Peoples Choice Awards

| Year | Nominated work | Category | Result |
|---|---|---|---|
| 1991 | Reasonable Doubts | Favorite Female Performer in a New Television Series | Nominated |
| 1999 | Where the Truth Lies | Favorite Female Performer in a New Television Series | Nominated |

- Primetime Emmy Awards

| Year | Nominated work | Category | Result |
|---|---|---|---|
| 1994 | Seinfeld: "The Lip Reader" | Outstanding Guest Actress in a Comedy Series | Nominated |
| 1994 | Picket Fences: "Dancing Bandit" | Outstanding Guest Actress in a Drama Series | Nominated |
| 2000 | The Practice: "Life Sentence" | Outstanding Guest Actress in a Drama Series | Nominated |
| 2004 | Law & Order: SVU: "Painless" | Outstanding Guest Actress in a Drama Series | Nominated |

- San Diego International Film Festival

| Year | Nominated work | Category | Result |
|---|---|---|---|
| 2025 | Lifetime Achievement | Visionary Impact Award | Honored |

- Screen Actors Guild Awards

| Year | Nominated work | Category | Result |
|---|---|---|---|
| 1995 | Picket Fences | Outstanding Drama Series Cast | Nominated |
| 2022 | CODA | Outstanding Cast in a Motion Picture | Won |

- Satellite Awards

| Year | Nominated work | Category | Result |
|---|---|---|---|
| 2022 | CODA | Best Supporting Actress | Nominated |

- Utah Film Critics Association Awards

| Year | Nominated work | Category | Result |
|---|---|---|---|
| 1986 | Children of a Lesser God | Best Actress | Won |

- Viewers for Quality Television Awards

| Year | Nominated work | Category | Result |
|---|---|---|---|
| 1991 | Reasonable Doubts | Best Actress in a Quality Drama Series | Nominated |
| 1992 | Reasonable Doubts | Best Actress in a Quality Drama Series | Nominated |
| 1994 | Picket Fences | Specialty Player | Nominated |

- Women Film Critics Circle Awards

| Year | Nominated work | Category | Result |
|---|---|---|---|
| 2021 | CODA | Best Screen Couple (shared with Troy Kotsur) | Nominated |

== See also ==
- Marlee Matlin filmography
- List of Academy Award records
- List of oldest and youngest Academy Award winners and nominees – Youngest winners for Best Actress in a Leading Role
- List of oldest and youngest Academy Award winners and nominees – Youngest nominees for Best Actress in a Leading Role
- List of Jewish Academy Award winners and nominees
- List of actors with Academy Award nominations
