= Sweet Nothing in My Ear =

- Based on: Sweet Nothing in My Ear by Stephen Sachs
- Written by: Stephen Sachs
- Directed by: Joseph Sargent
- Starring: Jeff Daniels; Marlee Matlin; Sonya Walger; Ed Waterstreet; Phyllis Frelich; David Oyelowo; John Rubinstein; Carlease Burke; Shoshannah Stern; Noah Valencia
- Theme music composer: Charles Bernstein
- Country of origin: United States
- Original languages: English; American Sign Language

Production
- Producer: Marian Rees
- Cinematography: Donald M. Morgan
- Editor: Michael Brown
- Running time: 110 minutes
- Production company: Hallmark Hall of Fame

Original release
- Network: CBS
- Release: April 20, 2008

Sweet Nothing in My Ear is a 2008 American made-for-television drama film directed by Joseph Sargent and is based on a 1998 play of the same name by Stephen Sachs, who also wrote the teleplay. It stars Jeff Daniels and Marlee Matlin as Dan and Laura Miller, the parents of deaf child Adam, played by Noah Valencia, who struggle with deciding to give their child an implant that will allow him to hear again. The film premiered on CBS as a Hallmark Hall of Fame presentation on April 20, 2008. This was the final film directed by Sargent before his death on December 22, 2014.

With the film, Hallmark and producer-director Sargent revisited deafness with a universal theme contemplating the relationship of a minority group to society at large, 23 years after their previous film on a similar theme, the Emmy-winning Love Is Never Silent (1985). Daniels studied American Sign Language before filming, in order to portray the language accurately.

== Plot ==
Dan and Laura Miller have been married for nine years, are separated, and in a custody dispute over their deaf son, Adam. Their close relationship began to change when Adam loses his hearing at the age of four, the condition was initially accepted as Laura is deaf since her youth. Adam turns eight years old and he is injured when Dan is unable to warn him of oncoming danger. Dan begins to explore the idea of cochlear implants.

Flashbacks show how various situations in the Millers' lives have been advantageous and unfortunate to be deaf. The effects of deafness on the relationships of Adam's grandparents are explored as one set, Laura's parents Max and Sally, is deaf and the other, Dan's parents Louise and Henry, is hearing. The issue of deaf pride and deaf culture weighs in from the family.

The attorneys and the witnesses at the custody hearing focus on the benefits and disadvantages of cochlear implants. The case is to resume following the weekend. Both parents see that living separately is not helping with the raising of their children and they will make the decision as a family.

== Cast ==
- Marlee Matlin as Laura Miller
  - Elizabeth Greene as Laura Miller (voice)
- Jeff Daniels as Dan Miller
- Noah Valencia as Adam Miller
  - Zach Mills as Adam Miller (voice)
- Sonya Walger as Joanna Tate
- Ed Waterstreet as Max
  - Geoff Pierson as Max (voice)
- Phyllis Frelich as Sally
  - Priscilla Pointer as Sally (voice)
- David Oyelowo as Leonard Grisham
- John Rubinstein as Dr. Flynt
- Carlease Burke as Jennifer Kramer
- Shoshannah Stern as Valerie Park
- Rosemary Forsyth as Louise Miller
- Bradford English as Henry Miller
- Christopher Gartin as Dr. Weisman
- Deanne Bray as Dr Walters
- Colleen Flynn as Priscilla Scott
- Nolan Gould as Mark Scott
- Lia Sargent as Audiologist
- Garrett Ryan as David
- Colby French as David's Father

== Reception ==
The film was reviewed by Brian Lowry for Variety; the review summary reads, "Hallmark and producer-director Joseph Sargent revisit deafness with a universal theme that contemplates the relationship of a minority group to society at large. Here, the pivotal question involves a choice unavailable to most minorities — whether they would opt out of that status if possible. Buoyed by Marlee Matlin and Jeff Daniels' strong performances, the Hall of Fame's 233rd entry suffers a tepid ending but still gets its thoughtful point across, loud and clear."

== See also ==
- Deaf culture
- List of films featuring the deaf and hard of hearing
