= This Close =

American television series

- Genre: Comedy
- Created by: Shoshannah Stern; Joshua Feldman
- Written by: Shoshannah Stern; Joshua Feldman
- Starring: Shoshannah Stern; Joshua Feldman
- Country of origin: United States
- No. of seasons: 2
- No. of episodes: 14

Production
- Executive producers: Wolfgang Hammer; Colette Burson; Andrew Ahn; Mary Pat Bentel; Joshua Feldman; David Hinojosa; Shoshannah Stern; Christine Vachon; Paul Young
- Producer: Joel Henry
- Production companies: Super Deluxe; Killer Films

Original release
- Network: Sundance TV
- Release: February 14, 2018 – September 21, 2019

This Close is a dramedy television series written by and starring deaf creators Shoshannah Stern and Josh Feldman that premiered on Sundance Now on February 14, 2018.

== Background ==
This Close began as Fridays, Stern and Feldman's Kickstarter web series, and then premiered at the 2017 Sundance Film Festival's Episodic Showcase as The Chances. It was Sundance Now's first straight-to-series order, and centers on two deaf best friends navigating their twenties in Los Angeles. Josh Feldman and Shoshannah Stern are the first deaf TV showrunners. According to the creators, approximately 25 of the cast and crew are also deaf.

Stern says when they were coming up with a title for the TV show, the network kept trying to pitch "words [that] they were trying to use to capture the deaf experience, like 'The Sound of Silence' [or] 'Deaf Like Me.' But I said, 'I think we’re working backwards... instead of trying to find an English word that captures the deaf experience, we should be thinking of a sign'." Stern and Feldman came up with the title, This Close, as a translation for a sign that's "your index finger and your middle finger crossing." According to Stern, it's a sign that has many different translations: "We’re showing something that’s intertwined... [it's] a sign used for “best friends, “like this” or “this close”. So we came up with “this close” from that."

It was renewed for a second season in April 2018. This Close is developed and produced by Super Deluxe.

== Cast ==
=== Main ===
- Shoshannah Stern as Kate
- Josh Feldman as Michael

=== Recurring ===
- Colt Prattes as Ryan
- Zach Gilford as Danny
- Cheryl Hines as Stella
- Nyle DiMarco as Ben Genovese
- Moshe Kasher as Jacob
- Marlee Matlin as Annie
- Colleen Foy as Taylor
- Marcia Cross as Blythe
- Camryn Manheim as The Therapist
- Steven Weber as Michael's Dad
- Austin Nichols as Shep
- Lisa Rinna as Ryan's Mom
- Margaret Cho as Zagat
- Millicent Simmonds as Emmaline
- Marylouise Burke as Hollis
- Jessica Tuck as Carol
- Will Murden as Nathan
- Colleen Foy as Taylor
- Shaylee Mansfield as Margaret
- Bryan Michael Nunez as Jimmy
- John P. McGinty as Blaine
- CJ Jones as Craig
- Joseph Haro as Noah
- Dot-Marie Jones as Judy/Judith

== Episodes ==
Season	Episodes	Originally released	
Season	Episodes	First released	Last released
1	6	February 14, 2018	March 15, 2018
2	8	September 13, 2019	September 21, 2019

=== Season 1 (2018) ===
No. overall	No. in season	Title	Directed by	Written by	Original release date	U.S. viewers (millions)
1	1	"Like I Always Wanted"	Andrew Ahn	Joshua Feldman & Shoshannah Stern	February 14, 2018	N/A
Michael and Kate go to Seattle together to a bookstore for a book signing. Kate's secret is revealed to Michael leading him to be in trouble with the airport's security.
2	2	"Who We Are"	Andrew Ahn	Joshua Feldman & Shoshannah Stern	February 14, 2018	N/A
Kate is asked to be on the “Disabilities in Media” panel by her boss where she must decide to not do it or pretend to and go along with it. Ryan (Michael's former boyfriend) comes over uninvited at dinner.
3	3	"Night and Day"	Andrew Ahn	Joshua Feldman & Shoshannah Stern	February 22, 2018	N/A
Kate's PR event is going great until a deaf celeb comes to it. Stella makes her special brownies which create a hazy day. Michael makes a shocking decision while clubbing.
4	4	"The Chances"	Andrew Ahn	Joshua Feldman & Shoshannah Stern	March 1, 2018	N/A
On Thanksgiving, Michael's mom (played by Marlee Matlin) arrives with Michael's brother where they reveal upsetting secrets while keeping other secrets private. Kate's ideal perfect holiday meal is threatened by bad moods.
5	5	"The Way We Were"	Andrew Ahn	Joshua Feldman & Shoshannah Stern	March 8, 2018	N/A
One relationship is good while another is dissipated. Kate, Michael, Danny and Ryan's life a year before the series started is shown in flashbacks.
6	6	"What Happened to Us?"	Andrew Ahn	Joshua Feldman & Shoshannah Stern	March 15, 2018	N/A
Danny's secret is revealed to Kate but larger problems come due to a last-minute engagement party threatening to destroy the friendship between Kate and Michael.

=== Season 2 (2019) ===
No. overall	No. in season	Title	Directed by	Written by	Original release date	U.S. viewers (millions)
7	1	"Look Both Ways"	Stephen Cone	Josh Feldman & Shoshannah Stern	September 13, 2019	N/A
Kate fights over Michael with Ryan, Danny, and the hospital staff who don't understand how to deal with deaf patients. Ryan and Michael make a hasty decision that sends Kate spinning, and by the time the sun rises, the two friends are worlds apart.
8	2	"No Place Like Home"	Stephen Cone	Shoshannah Stern	September 13, 2019	N/A
Home in Georgia for her grandmother's 80th birthday and to mend her heart, Kate runs into her ex-fiance and starts to wonder about the path not taken. Kate unintentionally derails her mother's intricate plans for the party.
9	3	"Three's Company"	Jordan Firstman	Josh Feldman & Shoshannah Stern	September 14, 2019	N/A
Kate throws herself into work after moving into Ryan's guest house. When things go wrong on a commercial shoot with Ben, she must convince him to do the right thing. Michael is offered a deal that will get him out of his publishing debt.
10	4	"Wait Until Dark"	Bridey Elliott	Josh Feldman & Shoshannah Stern	September 14, 2019	N/A
Ryan insists Kate come along on a family camping trip that he and Michael planned for Jacob's visit. Things take a wrong turn when secrets start spilling and tempers flare. The horror escalates when night falls, and the group loses one of their own.
11	5	"Frog of Truth"	Jordan Firstman	Josh Feldman & Shoshannah Stern	September 20, 2019	N/A
Kate and Michael try to dive back into normality after the camping trip. Kate receives an upsetting version of Ben's commercial on the same day an unexpected visitor arrives. Michael and Ryan begin couples therapy, but Michael begins to act out.
12	6	"Games People Play"	Jordan Firstman	Josh Feldman & Shoshannah Stern	September 20, 2019	N/A
Michael plans an elaborate brunch to apologize to Ryan and while Kate wants nothing to do with it, a discovery forces her to stay put. An innocent game turns ugly, bringing out the worst in everyone.
13	7	"It's About Time"	Coy Middlebrook	Josh Feldman	September 21, 2019	N/A
Kate escorts Michael on an out of town trip after the fallout of the brunch. As Michael struggles to acclimate to the environment and relate to the people there, he begins to unlock the painful memories of his past.
14	8	"Begin Again"	Andrew Ahn	Josh Feldman & Shoshannah Stern	September 21, 2019	N/A
Kate and Michael have celebrated their friendversary religiously every year... until now. Kate is thrilled when Stella asks her to lunch. Michael dives into his new teaching job. Some shocking news threatens the future of Kate and Michael's friendship.

== Reception ==
This Close is the first television series created, written by and starring deaf artists and has garnered attention for its representation of the deaf community. Mike Hale of The New York Times called it "funny and poignant in ways we haven't seen before...deftly directed and impressively cast." It was featured on Vulture's "Best Shows of 2018" list and was described as a "terrific, quietly groundbreaking series."
