= Louise Stern =

American writer and artist (born 1978)

- Born: 1978 (age 47–48); California, U.S.
- Education: Gallaudet University; Sotheby's Institute of Art (MA)
- Occupations: Writer, artist
- Relatives: Shoshannah Stern (sister)
- Writing career
- Notable work: Chattering

Louise Stern (born 1978) is an American writer and artist, and works around ideas of language, communication and isolation.

Stern grew up in an exclusively deaf community and is fourth-generation deaf on her father's side, and third-generation deaf on her mother's side. She attended California School for the Deaf, Fremont.

== Literature ==
Her first collection of short stories, Chattering, was published by Granta in 2011. Alan Warner called it "an amazing debut: vibrantly perceptive, gentle, funny and profound".

Her first novel, Ismael and His Sisters, was written and set in a deaf village in the Yucatán Peninsula, where Stern communicated in Mayan Sign Language. There will be an accompanying book of photographs to it.

She has also written plays, including The Ugly Birds and The Interpreter, which was performed at the Bush Theatre. Stern was commissioned to write stories for BBC Radio 4 in 2012 and 2013.

== Visual art ==
Stern studied at Gallaudet University, where she was the only student studying art history. She moved to the United Kingdom in 2002 where she gained a Master of Arts from Sotheby's Institute of Art and worked as an assistant to Sam Taylor-Wood.

Her own artwork has been exhibited in galleries in Geneva, Barcelona, Madrid, London, and Port Eliot. She is the founder and publisher of Maurice, a contemporary art magazine for children.

== Film ==
She directed a film, Celan, based on the poetry of Paul Celan. The first screening had live spoken accompaniment by Polly Frame. The premiere screening of Celan and accompanying live performance took place at a PoetryFilm Equinox event curated by Zata Kitowski.

In 1999, she acted with her sister Shoshannah in the film The Auteur Theory.

She is the subject of the film Louisa in Majahua.

== Books ==
- Chattering, Granta Books, 2011. ISBN 1847081770
- Ismael and His Sisters, Granta Books, 2015 ISBN 9781847089458
