= Dorothea G. Petrie =

American television film producer (c.1925–2020)

Dorothea G. Petrie (c. 1925 - November 24, 2020) was an American television film producer. She had twice won the Primetime Emmy Award for Outstanding Television Movie for her work in Love Is Never Silent (1985) and Caroline? (1990). She also received a third nomination for the same category for Foxfire (1987). Petrie was also a founding member of the Producers Guild of America.

== Personal life and death ==
Petrie was married to Canadian filmmaker Daniel Petrie from 1957 until his death in 2004. They had four children, including Daniel Petrie Jr. and Donald Petrie, and seven grandchildren.

Petrie died of natural causes in her home in Los Angeles at the age of 95.

== Select filmography ==
- The Single Girls (1974)
- Orphan Train (1979)
- License to Kill (1984)
- Love Is Never Silent (1985)
- Foxfire (1987)
- Caroline? (1990)
- Crash Landing: The Rescue of Flight 232 (1992)
- The Face on the Milk Carton (1995)
- The Echo of Thunder (1998)
