= International Center on Deafness and the Arts =

American non-profit organization

- Founded: 1997
- Founder: Dr. Patricia Scherer
- Type: 501(c)(3)
- Purpose: Deafness and Arts
- Location: Northbrook, Illinois
- Website: www.oneillustration.com/clients/ICODA/WWW/about/index.html

International Center on Deafness and the Arts (ICODA) is a non-profit organization based in Northbrook, Illinois, US. Patricia Scherer is the founder and president. Founded in 1973, the organization is a registered nonprofit, tax exempt, 501(c)(3) corporation.

== History ==
The Center on Deafness was founded in 1973 by Patricia Scherer, and became the International Center On Deafness and the Arts in July 1997.

== ICODA Programs ==
CenterLight Family Theatre performs using American Sign Language and Spoken English concurrently during the performance.

Story-N-Sign Touring Theatre was created in 1995. Performers who are Deaf, Hard of Hearing, and Hearing perform short stories, poems and mimes in American Sign Language and Spoken English.

Icodance is a dance company whose dancers are Deaf, Hard of Hearing and Hearing.

Traveling Hands Troupe (THT) serves as an outreach program for ICODance Company. The program's members are deaf, hard of hearing, and hearing persons between the ages of 7 and 18. The troupe performs poems, interpreted song and dance for various service organizations.

I.O.I Program - In 1994 a partnership between Illinois State University, Oakton Community College & ICODA was established for the primary purpose of training teachers of the deaf and hard of hearing in the Chicago area.

Museum on Deafness at ICODA is a permanent exhibit on deafness and hearing loss.

== Awards ==
- Best New Freedom Community Program, Northbrook Arts Commission, 1993
- Speech & Hearing Foundation Lifetime Achievement Award, Northwestern University, 1994
- Presidents Award, Boulevard Art Center, 1994
- Best Ensemble Award for Godspell, Chicago After Dark Theater Awards, 1996
- Village of Northbrook established "Recognize ICODA Day in Northbrook", 1998
- Omni Youth Services, Outstanding Recognition, 2000

== See also ==
- Marlee Matlin
