= Deborah LaVine =

American film director

Deborah LaVine is an American theater and independent film director. She is also the dean of the University of North Carolina School of the Arts School of Filmmaking.

== Career ==
=== Teaching ===
Dean of Filmmaking School of Filmmaking University of North Carolina School of the Arts (2021 - Present).

Director of the Film Directing Program at the California Institute of the Arts (CalArts) in Valencia, California.

=== Theater ===
LaVine has directed over 300 professional theater productions across the United States. She has received several awards including Ovation Awards, Drama-Logue/Back Stage Garland Awards, and an NAACP Image Award citation.

Select Los Angeles productions include Napoli Milionara at the Road Theater (Ovation award winner Outstanding Director and Best Production), Bertolt Brecht’s The Resistible Rise of Arturo Ui at Theater Exchange, Deaf West Theatre’s Streetcar Named Desire (Ovation award Best Production), Kindertransport starring Holland Taylor and Jane Kaczmarek at the Tiffany Theater, Distant Fires at International City Theater (NAACP Image Award Citation for Excellence), The Accomplices at the Fountain Theatre, and Edgemar Center for the Arts long running Black Cat Cabaret.

LaVine directed a staged reading of Kindertransport at the Wallis Annenberg Center for the Performing Arts in partnership with Holocaust Museum of Los Angeles.

=== Film ===
LaVine's 2016 debut feature film, Wild Prairie Rose, premiered at Geena Davis’ Bentonville Film Festival and won prizes including the inaugural Jimmy Stewart Legacy Award at the Heartland Film Festival, Sedona International Film Festival (Audience Award for Best Feature), Seattle Deaf Film Festival (Opening Night Film and Best Drama), Cambria Film Festival (Jury and Audience Awards for Best Feature), Toronto International Deaf Film Festival (Opening Night Film, Best Feature and Audience Choice Award), Sioux Empire Film Festival (Best Cinematography and Best Film), Cinema At the Edge Festival (Opening Night Film and Jury Award Best Feature), Omaha National Film Festival, Black Hills Film Festival (Best Feature), Sioux Empire Film Festival (Best Feature), La Femme International Festival, St. Louis Film Festival, ReelAbilities Film Festival NYC, and Cinema Falls Cinematheque.

LaVine's short film, Unintended features Jeff Perry, a founding member of the Steppenwolf Theater Company and co-star of the television series, Scandal.

Lavine's other film work includes Lost Music, a lyrical exploration of loss and memory featuring Barbara Bain and the short film, Prairie Sonata.

LaVine also directed a short film, Dancing with Shadows.

== Awards ==
- Ovation Award winner for Outstanding Director and Best Production for Napoli Millionaria at the Road Theatre.
- Ovation Award nominee Best Director A Streetcar Named Desire Deaf West Theatre.
