= Ed Waterstreet =

American artistic director

Ed Waterstreet (born Edmund Waterstreet, May 5, 1943, in Algoma, Wisconsin) is a Deaf American actor and one of the founders (along with his wife, Linda Bove) and the artistic director of Deaf West Theatre, which was established in 1991, and was the first resident theatre company in America operating under the direction of a deaf artistic director.

Waterstreet has acted in a few films such as Love Is Never Silent (1985), Snowbound, and Sweet Nothing in My Ear (2008), as well as an episode of The Pretender.

== Personal life ==
Since 1970, he has been married to Linda Bove, best known for her role as "Linda the Librarian" from Sesame Street.
