= Love Is Never Silent =

1985 television film by Joseph Sargent

- Based on: In This Sign by Joanne Greenberg
- Written by: Darlene Craviotto
- Directed by: Joseph Sargent
- Starring: Mare Winningham; Sid Caesar; Phyllis Frelich; Ed Waterstreet; Cloris Leachman; Fredric Lehne
- Composer: Billy Goldenberg
- Country of origin: United States
- Original language: English

Production
- Executive producer: Marian Rees
- Producer: Dorothea G. Petrie
- Production locations: Vancouver, British Columbia, Canada
- Cinematography: David Gribble
- Editor: Paul LaMastra
- Running time: 100 minutes
- Production companies: Hallmark Hall of Fame Productions; Marian Rees Associates; Telepictures Productions

Original release
- Network: NBC
- Release: December 9, 1985

Love Is Never Silent is an American drama television film that premiered on NBC on December 9, 1985, as part of the Hallmark Hall of Fame anthology series. It is directed by Joseph Sargent and written by Darlene Craviotto, based on the novel In This Sign by Joanne Greenberg. The film stars Mare Winningham, Phyllis Frelich, Ed Waterstreet, Fredric Lehne, Cloris Leachman and Sid Caesar. It follows Margaret Ryder, a young woman who struggles with her own need for independence and the obligation she feels for her deaf parents Abel and Janice.

It received positive reviews from critics and won two Primetime Emmy Awards, for Outstanding Drama/Comedy Special and Outstanding Directing in a Miniseries or a Special for Sargent, from a total of five nominations.

== Plot ==
The film begins in the 1930s and takes place over the following twenty years. Ten-year old Margaret Ryder is a hearing child of deaf parents. After her younger brother Bradley is killed in an accident, she has to negotiate a price for his coffin, as her parents Abel and Janice are unable to communicate with the speaking world. Margaret assists her parents at all times, but sometimes feels left out of the hearing world, as her parents don't encourage her to mix with others. Her only true friend is Mr. Petrakis, an immigrant from Greece who used the radio to learn English. As Margaret gets older, she excels in high school math and upon graduating high school, she gets a job.

At work, Margaret meets William Anglin, who asks her out. She turns him down multiple times as she is still living with and helping her parents in their new house. She finally accepts as he is enlisted in the war. They develop a romance and write to each other while he is gone. William comes home for a few days and they quickly marry as he is due to go back the next day. Abel and Janice are furious, but they eventually agree to meet his family.

William comes home from the war early after an injury and stays with Margaret and her parents for a few weeks until he is accepted into a university. They move out of her family home and into a small university apartment. Margaret's parents come to visit and are not happy with the accommodation they are living in and leave.

Margaret and her parents don't speak for a while until Margaret shows up at their house, pregnant. Her parents begin to argue with her about how well William is providing for her and how responsible she is. Finally, she tells them that she has been responsible her whole life as she has had to interpret the world for her parents since she was little. Tearfully, she sits alone in a church and reminisces over her times with Mr. Petrakis, who has recently died. Margaret gives birth to a son, Marshall. At the Christening, her parents arrive and they are reunited.

Five years later, Janice is retiring and the factory she worked at is throwing her a party. She stands in front of everyone and signs a speech about how the hearing and deaf are alike and should not be divided.

== Cast ==
- Mare Winningham as Margaret Ryder
  - Susan Curtis as Young Margaret Ryder
- Phyllis Frelich as Janice Ryder
- Ed Waterstreet as Abel Ryder
- Fredric Lehne as William Anglin
- Cloris Leachman as Mrs. Anglin
- Sid Caesar as Mr. Petrakis
- Lou Fant as Reverend Maartens
- Mark Hildreth as Bradley Ryder
- Julianna Fjeld as Barbara
- Jeff Schultz as Donald Anglin
- Jeremy Christall as Marshall Anglin
- Ted Stidder as Doctor
- Jackson Davies as Realtor
- Stephen E. Miller as Driver
- Alex Diakun as Funeral Director
- Greg Hayes as Neil Switzer
- Jennifer Michas as Ester Cohen
- Twyla-Dawn Vokins as Marie
- David Petersen as Mr. Cotter
- Frank C. Turner as Factory Foreman

== Reception ==
=== Critical response ===
Howard Rosenberg of the Los Angeles Times wrote that the film "is exceptional and very special, a near flawless execution of a wise, tender and acutely soulful story" and called it "a lovely, achingly real, intense and sometimes angry small film that blows away musty definitions and explodes stereotypes." Rosenberg also highlighted Joseph Sargent's direction and the performances of Mare Winningham, Phyllis Frelich and Ed Waterstreet. Patricia Brennan of The Washington Post stated that the film "fulfills its visual task" and "is beautifully filmed." Brennan also praised the performances of the cast, noting "Frelich and Waterstreet do splendid jobs" and Winningham's performance "may touch your heart." John Corry of The New York Times described it as "an extremely good-looking production" and concluded his review by writing, "Love Is Never Silent is intelligent and sometimes moving, but it doesn't quite touch us the way it should."

=== Accolades ===
Year	Award	Category	Recipient(s)	Result
1986	2nd TCA Awards	Outstanding Achievement in Drama	Love Is Never Silent	Nominated
1986	38th Primetime Emmy Awards	Outstanding Drama/Comedy Special	Marian Rees, Julianna Fjeld and Dorothea G. Petrie	Won
1986	38th Primetime Emmy Awards	Outstanding Lead Actress in a Miniseries or a Special	Mare Winningham	Nominated
1986	38th Primetime Emmy Awards	Outstanding Supporting Actress in a Miniseries or a Special	Phyllis Frelich	Nominated
1986	38th Primetime Emmy Awards	Outstanding Directing in a Miniseries or a Special	Joseph Sargent	Won
1986	38th Primetime Emmy Awards	Outstanding Writing in a Miniseries or a Special	Darlene Craviotto	Nominated

== See also ==
- List of films featuring the deaf and hard of hearing
