= John Rubinstein =

American actor, composer and director (born 1946)

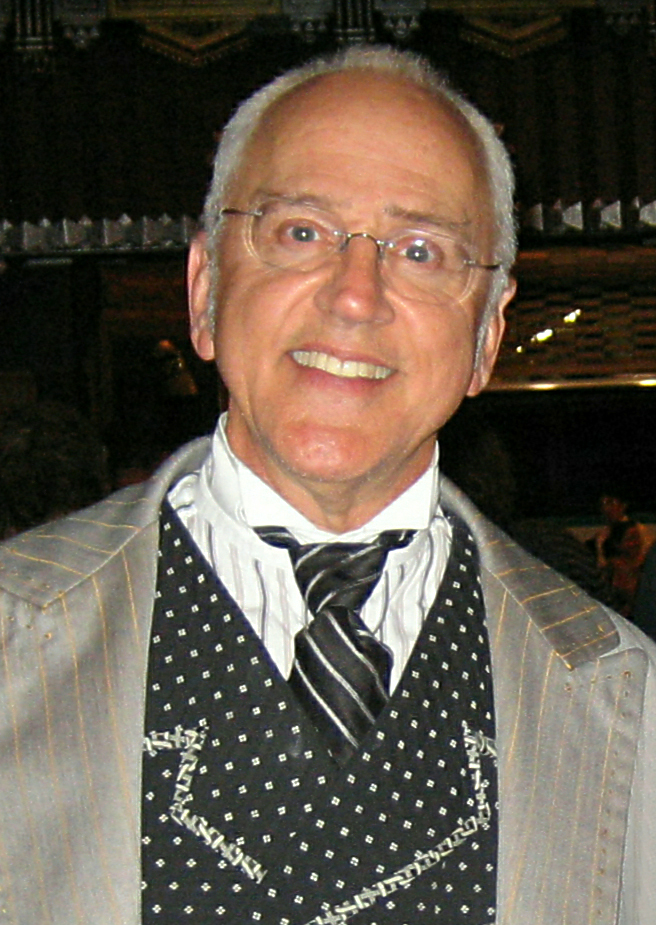
- Rubinstein in 2008
- Born: December 8, 1946 (age 79); Los Angeles, California, U.S.
- Occupations: Actor; composer; director
- Years active: 1967–present
- Spouses: Judi West (m. 1971; div. 1992) Jane Lanier (m. 1992; div. 2002) Bonnie Burgess (m. 2016)
- Children: 5, including Jacob Rubinstein, Peter Rubinstein, and Michael Weston

John Rubinstein (born December 8, 1946) is an American actor, composer and director.

== Early life ==
Rubinstein is the son of Polish parents. His mother, Aniela (née Młynarska), a dancer and writer, was a Roman Catholic native of Warsaw, the daughter of conductor Emil Młynarski. His father was Polish-Jewish concert pianist Arthur Rubinstein. He attended El Rodeo Public School in Beverly Hills (K–2), Cours La Cascade in Paris, France (1954), and St. Bernard's School (3–8) and Collegiate School (New York City) (9–12) in New York City. He studied theater and music at the University of California, Los Angeles (1964–1967), and later composition at the Juilliard School in New York.

== Career ==
=== Theater ===
Rubinstein made his Broadway acting debut in 1972 and received a Theatre World Award for creating the title role in the musical Pippin, directed by Bob Fosse. In 1980 he won the Tony, Drama Desk, Los Angeles Drama Critics Circle, and Drama-Logue Awards for his portrayal of James Leeds in Mark Medoff's Children of a Lesser God, directed by Gordon Davidson.

Other Broadway appearances were in Neil Simon's Fools, directed by Mike Nichols, and Herman Wouk's The Caine Mutiny Court-Martial, which earned him a Drama Desk nomination; he replaced William Hurt as Eddie in David Rabe's Hurlyburly, replaced David Dukes in David Henry Hwang's M. Butterfly, and starred in Getting Away with Murder, by Stephen Sondheim and George Furth, directed by Jack O'Brien, and Ragtime, by Terrence McNally, Stephen Flaherty, and Lynn Ahrens. In 2014, he joined the Broadway cast of the hit revival of Pippin, directed by Diane Paulus, this time playing Pippin's father, Charlemagne; and subsequently repeated that role on the national tour throughout the United States and Japan in 2014–15.

In 2016, it was announced that Rubinstein would join fellow Tony-winner Christian Borle in Charlie and the Chocolate Factory as Grandpa Joe, directed by Jack O'Brien.

In 2023 he starred in the one man biographical show Eisenhower: This Piece of Ground debuting Off-Broadway at the St. Clemens Theatre in New York City and subsequently touring around the US. The show portrays the former president at his home in retirement, working on his second autobiography, reminiscing about his life and musing about his popularity and how he will be remembered.

He taught a course in musical theater audition techniques at the University of Southern California, and directed their spring musicals.

=== Film and television ===
Rubinstein's feature films include 21 Grams, Red Dragon, Mercy, Another Stakeout, Someone to Watch Over Me, Daniel, The Boys from Brazil, Rome & Jewel, Jekyll, Kid Cop, Getting Straight, Zachariah, The Trouble with Girls, and The Car. He appears in the film Being the Ricardos as Jess Oppenheimer. On television he starred in Crazy Like a Fox from 1984-1986.

== Acting credits ==
=== Film ===
Year	Title	Role	Notes
1969	The Trouble with Girls	Princeton	
1970	Getting Straight	Herbert	
1971	Zachariah	Zachariah	
1971	The Sandpit Generals	Professor	
1977	The Car	John Morris	
1978	The Boys from Brazil	David Bennett	
1979	In Search of Historic Jesus	Jesus	
1983	Daniel	Robert Lewin	
1987	Someone to Watch Over Me	Neil Steinhart	
1993	Another Stakeout	Thomas Hassrick, Las Vegas District Attorney	
1995	Mercy	Frank Kramer	
1996	Kid Cop	Stan Dwerkin	Direct-to-video
2002	Red Dragon	Dinner Guest	
2003	21 Grams	Gynecologist	
2006	Rome & Jewel	Major Capps	
2007	Sublime	Dr. Lichterhand	Direct-to-video
2007	Choose Connor	Cary Evor	
2012	Atlas Shrugged	Dr. Floyd Ferris	
2015	The Atticus Institute	Marcus Wheeler	
2021	Being the Ricardos	Older Jess Oppenheimer	

=== Television ===
Year	Title	Role	Notes
1967	Dragnet	Paul Whidden	Episode: "The Grenade"
1967	The Virginian	Billy Simmons	Episode: "The Deadly Past"
1967	Ironside	2nd Hippie	Episode: "The Leaf in the Forest"
1969	Room 222	Martin Kaufman	Episode: "The Flu"
1970	The Bold Ones: The Protectors	Private Kelley	Episode: "A Thing Not of God"
1970	The Young Lawyers	Dan Fulton	Episode: "We May Be Better Strangers"
1970	The Psychiatrist: God Bless the Children	Teddy	Television film
1971	Matt Lincoln	Christopher	Episode: "Christopher"
1971	Men at Law	Ron Martin	Episode: "Hostage"
1971	Nichols	Fred Buckerman	Episode: "Paper Badge"
1971	The Psychiatrist	Randell File	Episode: "Ex-Sgt. Randell File, U.S.A."
1971	The Mod Squad	Larry Wheeler	Episode: "Survival"
1971	A Howling in the Woods	Justin Conway	Television film
1972	Something Evil	Ernest Lincoln	Television film
1972	Cannon	Larry Bolinger	Episode: "A Deadly Quiet Town"
1972	The Mary Tyler Moore Show	Matt, Jr.	Episode: "You Certainly Are a Big Boy"
1972, 1977	The Streets of San Francisco	Lindy/Walter J. Young	2 episodes
1972, 1977	Hawaii Five-O	Harold/Joey Kalima	2 episodes
1975	All Together Now	Bill Lindsay	Television film
1975	Police Woman	Tommy Donlevy	Episode: "Glitter with a Bullet"
1975	Mr. & Ms. and the Magic Studio Mystery	David	Television film
1975	Wide World Mystery	David	Episode: "Mr. & Mrs. and the Bandstand Mystery"
1975	Movin' On	Gershon Simenov	Episode: "Stowaway"
1975–1976	Harry O	Jack Dawes/Richard Trask	2 episodes
1975–1976	Barnaby Jones	Chris Garrison/Larry Christopher	2 episodes
1976	The Quest: The Longest Drive	Wakely	Television film
1976	Barbary Coast	Garrison	Episode: "The Dawson Marker"
1976	The Rookies	Dr. Richard Komansky	Episode: "The Mugging"
1976	The Quest	Wakely	2 episodes
1976–1980	Family	Jeff Maitland	12 episodes
1977	Corey: For the People	Dan Corey	Television film
1977	Lou Grant	Andrew Martin	Episode: "Hostages"
1977	What Really Happened to the Class of '65?	Jaik	Episode: "The Girl Nobody Knew"
1977	Wonder Woman	Major Dexter	Episode: "The Deadly Toys"
1978	Happily Ever After	Richy	Television film
1978–1987	The Love Boat	George Allison/Jack Forbes/Allan Davis	4 episodes
1979	Vega$	Vance Spilroy	Episode: "Best Friends"
1979	Roots: The Next Generations	Lieutenant Hamilton Ten Eyck	Miniseries
1979	The French Atlantic Affair	Herb Kleinfeld	Miniseries
1979	She's Dressed to Kill	Alan Lenz	Television film
1979, 1984	Fantasy Island	Johnny Court/Donald King	2 episodes
1980	Make Me an Offer	Dr. Max Westcott	Television film
1980	The Silent Lovers	Irving Thalberg	Television film
1981	Killjoy	Dr. Paul Trenton	Television film
1981	Skokie	Herb Lewisohn	Television film
1982	Freedom to Speak	William Lloyd Garrison/Patrick Henry/Charles Lindbergh/Rabbi Stephen Wise	Miniseries
1982	Quincy M.E.	Dr. Walter Ross	Episode: "Unreasonable Doubt"
1983	I Take These Men	David Koenig	Television film
1983	Trapper John, M.D.	Hank Palmer	Episode: "Hear Today, Gone Tomorrow"
1983	M.A.D.D.: Mothers Against Drunk Drivers	Steve White	Television film
1983	Emerald Point N.A.S.	Lt. Cmdr. Edwards	3 episodes
1984	The Paper Chase	Professor Wendell Peterson	Episode: "Judgement Day"
1984–1986	Crazy Like a Fox	Harrison Fox	35 episodes
1987	The Two Mrs. Grenvilles	Bratsie Bleeker	Television film
1987	Still Crazy Like a Fox	Harrison Fox, Jr.	Television film
1987	Jake and the Fatman	Brent Moore	Episode: "Happy Days Are Here Again"
1988	Highway to Heaven	Matthew	Episode: "Time in a Bottle"
1988	Hotel	Cliff Phillips	Episode: "Aftershocks"
1988	Beryl Markham: A Shadow on the Sun	Arthur Kane	Television film
1988	Sam Found Out: A Triple Play	Johnny	Television film
1988	Liberace	Jamie	Television film
1988	Matlock	Carl Benedict/Dr.Douglas Clark	4 episodes
1990	Voices Within: The Lives of Truddi Chase	Norman De Roin	Miniseries
1991	Father Dowling Mysteries	Tim	Episode: "The Prodigal Son Mystery"
1992	In My Daughter's Name	Ban Worrall	Television film
1992	Murder, She Wrote	George Foster	Episode: "The Classic Murder"
1993	The American Clock	Moe Baumler	Television film
1993	Frasier	Phillip Hayson	Episode: "The Crucible"
1993	Against the Grain	Mr. O’Brien	Episode: "E Pluribus Unum"
1994	RoboCop	Chip Chayken	4 episodes
1994	NYPD Blue	Mr. Bernstein	Episode: "Double Abandando"
1994, 1996	Diagnosis: Murder	Thomas Taylor/Peter Trent	2 episodes
1994, 1997	Party of Five	Walter Alcott	2 episodes
1995	Lois & Clark: The New Adventures of Superman	Emmet Vale	Episode: "Metallo"
1995	Star Trek: Voyager	John Evansville	Episode: "The 37s"
1996	Norma Jean & Marilyn	Darryl F. Zanuck	Television film
1996	Superman: The Animated Series	Peterson (voice)	Episode: "A Little Piece of Home"
1996	Early Edition	Marcus	Episode: "The Choice"
1997	ER	Dr. Kenner	Episode: "Night Shift"
1997	The Sleepwalker Killing	Dr. Frank Corrigan	Television film
1998	The Practice	Judge Joseph Papp	3 episodes
2000	Perfect Murder, Perfect Town	Rev. Hoverstock	Television film
2000	Family Law	Garwicz	Episode: "Family Values"
2001	Boston Public	Judge Joseph Papp	Episode: "Chapter Thirteen"
2001	The West Wing	Sen. Andy Ritter	Episode: "18th and Potomac"
2001	Gideon's Crossing	Larry Palmer	Episode: "Clinical Enigma"
2001–2002	Angel	Linwood Murrow	6 episodes
2002	Judging Amy	James Pierpoint	Episode: "Can They Do That with Vegetables?"
2002	The District	George Wilson	Episode: "Wasteland"
2002	She Spies	Senator Thomas Jefferson Mitchell	Episode: "First Episode"
2002	The Guardian	Sen. Nathan Caldwell	4 episodes
2002, 2004	Star Trek: Enterprise	Mazarite Captain, Minister Kuvak	3 episodes
2003	Without a Trace	Dr. Feldman	Episode: "Underground Railroad"
2003	Kôkaku kidôtai: Stand Alone Complex	Ernest Serano (voice)	Episode: "Stand Alone Complex"
2003	Charmed	Dr. Berenson	Episode: "Cat House"
2003	24	Secretary of State	2 episodes
2003	The Division	Doctor Bertman	Episode: "Diagnosis"
2003	The Lyon's Den	Mr. Woodard	Episode: "The Other Side of Caution"
2003	Strong Medicine	Lyle LaCouer	Episode: "Prescriptions"
2003	NCIS	CIA Director Bob	Episode: "Marine Down"
2004	Becker	Dickie	Episode: "Subway Story"
2004	The Parkers	Jonathan	Episode: "She's Positive"
2004	Friends	The Doctor	2 episodes
2005	Amber Frey: Witness for the Prosecution	Mark Geragos	Television film
2005	The Closer	Dr. Brown	Episode: "Pilot"
2005	Jane Doe: The Wrong Face	Phil Raphaelson	Television film
2005	Mrs. Harris	Tarnower's Best Friend	Television film
2005	Barbershop	Nicholas Kane	3 episodes
2005	Law & Order: Special Victims Unit	Judge Schuyler	Episode: "Raw"
2005	House M.D.	Dr. Ayersman	Episode: "The Mistake"
2006	Law & Order	Mr. Thurber	Episode: "Heart of Darkness"
2006	Related	Dr. Shapiro	Episode: "The Godmother"
2006	CSI: Crime Scene Investigation	Judge Crawford	Episode: "The Unusual Suspect"
2006	Cold Case	Rafe Gray	Episode: "Willkommen"
2006	Criminal Minds	Hayden Rawlings	Episode: "P911"
2006	Shark	Lance Horning	Episode: "Russo"
2006	Girlfriends	Dr. Wulfberg	3 episodes
2006–2007	Day Break	Barry Colburn	5 episodes
2007	Jekyll	Daniel Carew	Miniseries
2008	Sweet Nothing in My Ear	Dr. Flynt	Television film; uncredited
2008	Eli Stone	Damon Smalls	Episode: "The Humanitarian"
2008	Dirty Sexy Money	Dr. Zwerling	3 episodes
2009	Supernatural	Charlie	Episode: "Criss Angel Is a Douche Bag"
2009	Brothers & Sisters	Dr. Marc Wilson	Episode: "Owning It"
2009	Numb3rs	Gene Evans	Episode: "Disturbed"
2009	Hawthorne	Dr. Lee	Episode: "No Guts, No Glory"
2009	Greek	Dr. Larsen	2 episodes
2009–2010	The Young and the Restless	Dr. Charles Taylor	12 episodes
2009–2012	Desperate Housewives	Principal Hobson	7 episodes
2011	Wizards of Waverly Place	Gorog	4 episodes
2012	Electric City	Richard "Dick" Jacobs	Web series
2013	Bones	Mick Warren	Episode: "The Twist in the Plot"
2014	Jessie	Ivan	Episode: "Spaced Out"
2016	Legends of Tomorrow	Albert Einstein	Episode: "Out of Time"
2017	Feud: Bette and Joan	George Cukor	2 episodes
2018	Chilling Adventures of Sabrina	Daniel Webster	Episode: "The Trial of Sabrina Spellman"
2018	Dirty John	Old William	Episode: "Lord High Executioner"
2018	Mom	Professor Addison	Episode: "Pre-Washed Lettuce and a Mime"
2018	The Orville	Prefect	Episode: "All the World is Birthday Cake"
2019	Proven Innocent	Clifford	Episode: "SEAL Team Deep Six"
2019	For All Mankind	Dr. Marsden	Episode: "Rupture"
2019	Pearson	Allan Steiner	Episode: "The Donor"
2019	Young Sheldon	Rabbi Schneiderman	Episode: "Albert Einstein and the Story of Another Mary"
2020	AJ and the Queen	Doctor	Episode: "Baton Rouge"
2021–2022	Claws	Baron Axel von Reichler	6 episodes
2025	Sub/liminal		

=== Theatre ===
Year	Title	Role	Notes
1967	Camelot	Mordred	Melodyland Theatre
1972	Pippin	Pippin	Kennedy Center
1972-1974	Pippin	Pippin	Broadway
1980-1982	Children of a Lesser God	James Leeds	Broadway
1983	The Caine Mutiny Court-Martial	Lt. Barney Greenwald	Broadway
1985	Merrily We Roll Along	Franklin Shepard	La Jolla Playhouse
1989-1990	M. Butterfly	René Gallimard	Broadway
1989	Love Letters	Andrew Makepeace Ladd III	Broadway
1990	Kiss of the Spider Woman	Molina	The PepsiCo Theatre
1995	Camelot	King Arthur	The Muny
1995	The Doctor is Out	Martin Chisholm	Old Globe Theatre
1996	Getting Away With Murder	Martin Chisholm	Broadway
1996-1997	Into the Woods	The Baker	Interact Theatre Company
1997-1998	Ragtime	Tateh	Shubert Theatre
1998	Ragtime	Tateh	Meridian Arts Centre
1998-1999	Ragtime	Tateh	Broadway
2000	Enigma Variations	Erik Larsen	Royal Alexandra Theatre
2001	A Little Night Music	Fredrik Egerman	Interact Theatre Company
2006	Urinetown	Caldwell B. Cladwell	Interact Theatre Company
2007-2008	Wicked	The Wonderful Wizard of Oz	Hollywood Pantages Theatre
2009	The Torch-Bearers	Frederick Ritter	Williamstown Theatre Festival
2010	Our Town	Dr. Gibbs	Williamstown Theatre Festival
2014	Pippin	King Charlemagne / Charles	Broadway
2014-2016	Pippin	King Charlemagne / Charles	US Tour
2017-2018	Charlie and the Chocolate Factory	Grandpa Joe	Broadway
2019	Cabaret	Herr Schultz	Ogunquit Playhouse
2022	Eisenhower: This Piece of Ground	Eisenhower	Los Angeles
2023-2024	Eisenhower: This Piece of Ground	Eisenhower	New York/Maryland

=== Video games ===
Year	Title	Role	Notes
2006	Metal Gear Solid: Portable Ops	Commander	

=== Voice Work ===
Rubinstein has also performed in 150 Audio Books, mostly in the genres of Mystery Thriller & Suspense (94) or science fiction/fantasy (18) genres, either as a character but usually narrating the entire text. He also read the part of Captain Kirk in the talking book version of Harlan Ellison's original teleplay for The City on the Edge of Forever.
