= Marlee Matlin: Not Alone Anymore =

2025 American documentary film by Shoshannah Stern

- Theatrical release poster
- Directed by: Shoshannah Stern
- Produced by: Shoshannah Stern; Bonni Cohen; Robyn Kopp; Justine Nagan
- Starring: Marlee Matlin
- Cinematography: Jon Shenk
- Edited by: Sara Newens
- Music by: Kathryn Bostic
- Production companies: Actual Films; Impact Partners; ITVS; American Masters Pictures
- Distributed by: Kino Lorber
- Release dates: January 23, 2025 (Sundance); June 20, 2025 (United States)
- Running time: 98 minutes
- Country: United States
- Languages: English; American Sign Language
- Box office: $109,285

Marlee Matlin: Not Alone Anymore is a 2025 American documentary film, directed and produced by Shoshannah Stern. It follows the life and career of Marlee Matlin.

It had its world premiere at the Sundance Film Festival on January 20, 2025, and was released on June 20, 2025, by Kino Lorber.

== Premise ==
Explores the life and career of actress Marlee Matlin.

== Production ==
In August 2024, it was announced Shoshannah Stern would direct a documentary revolving around Marlee Matlin, with Actual Films, American Masters, ITVS, Impact Partners set to produce, with American Masters retaining broadcast rights.

== Release ==
It had its world premiere at the 2025 Sundance Film Festival. In April 2025, Kino Lorber acquired distribution rights to the film, and set a June 20, 2025, release. It was broadcast on PBS as part of American Masters on October 14, 2025.

== Reception ==
On the review aggregator website Rotten Tomatoes, 98% of 56 critics' reviews are positive. The website's consensus reads: "Filled with heart and layered introspection, Shoshannah Stern's directorial debut traverses the trailblazing career of Marlee Matlin and deftly showcases the ways in which both are Not Alone Anymore." Metacritic, which uses a weighted average, assigned the film a score of 79 out of 100, based on 12 critics, indicating "generally favorable" reviews.
