= Linda Bove =

American actress (born 1945)

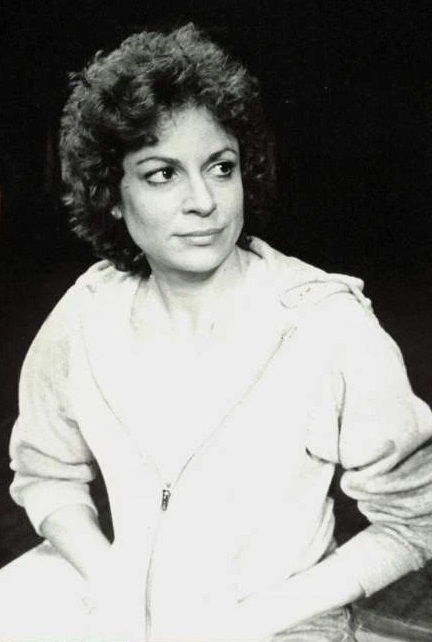
- Born: November 30, 1945 (age 80); Garfield, New Jersey, U.S.
- Education: Gallaudet University (B.S. Library Science 1968)
- Occupations: Actress, Certified Deaf Interpreter
- Years active: 1971–present
- Spouse: Ed Waterstreet (m. 1970)

Linda Bove (born November 30, 1945) is a Deaf American actress, her most notable role being a fictionalized version of herself in the PBS children's series Sesame Street from 1971 to 2002. Bove was the first Deaf actress to be a member of the program's recurring cast.

== Early life and education ==
Bove was born in Garfield, New Jersey, a Deaf child born to two Deaf parents. She has one brother, Michael, who is hearing. As a child, she attended St. Joseph School for the Deaf in The Bronx, New York and subsequently Marie H. Katzenbach School for the Deaf in Trenton, New Jersey, from which she graduated in 1963. She attended Gallaudet College, now Gallaudet University, studying library science. From there, she became interested in theatre. She participated in several theatrical productions at Gallaudet, including The Threepenny Opera and poetic characterizations of the Spoon River Anthology. In her senior year, she studied in a Summer School Program at the National Theatre of the Deaf (NTD).

Bove is an active member of the Deaf arts community.

== Career ==
=== Television ===
Bove appeared in an episode of Happy Days as Allison, Arthur Fonzarelli's deaf love interest. She also performed on the soap opera Search for Tomorrow, with the latter role making her one of the first deaf actors to become a regular on a soap opera series.

She also performed as a member of the National Theatre of the Deaf, founded in 1967.

Many cast members, crew, and technicians of the shows on which Bove has performed have learned sign language from her.

==== Sesame Street ====
Linda, portrayed by Bove, was a character on the children's program Sesame Street. When Bove debuted on Sesame Street with NTD in April 1971 (Episode 0243) as the Deaf character of her namesake, she was the first deaf performer on the show. Initially appearing sporadically, she became a regular member of the cast in 1975, and she continued to appear until 2002, making Linda the longest-running deaf character and Bove the longest-working Deaf actor on a single series in television history. In 2019, Linda returned to the franchise in the television special Sesame Street's 50th Anniversary Celebration, 17 years after her last appearance. She has introduced millions of children to sign language and issues surrounding the Deaf community, increasing public awareness of Deaf culture and to reassure others who are Deaf to be proud of who they are. Her character owns a very playful dog, Barkley.

Linda communicated only in American Sign Language and interacted with other members of the Sesame Street community as a citizen and resident of the community. The person who most often interpreted for her was Bob and eventually, he and Linda were portrayed in a romantic relationship. Linda made her living as a librarian, and had an assistant, Micki Barnett, who would read stories to the children, while Linda signed them.

The staff writers at Sesame Street were initially unsure of how to write for her. Bove said:

When I joined the cast I found the writers would write about 'How would a deaf person do this?' 'How does a deaf person do that?' and it was just related to my deafness and it didn't feel like they were treating me as a person. I found my character one-dimensional and kind of boring. It showed how brave a deaf person was to do this and that in everyday life. I said it was no big deal. I have a sense of humor; why don't you show that? I can be angry over something. Show that I can have a relationship with another person. Maybe a love relationship with Bob. It's not perfect, but... We do have misunderstandings over sign language, make fun of it, and show the funny side of it. It's OK."

In addition to playing Linda, Bove appeared frequently in various sketches and silent segments, where she was often paired up with Maria, played by Sonia Manzano, often playing a supporting role in Manzano's Charlie Chaplin silent film sketches (with occasional voiceovers), usually just as a woman in the sketch, but played a second Tramp if two were needed (e.g. the mirror sketch and the opening umbrellas sketch). Manzano and Bove worked in many other sketches together, both with and without dialogue, on-camera, or voiceover.

=== Theatre ===
In the 1970s, Bove and some of her colleagues started the Little Theatre of the Deaf to attract more deaf people, including children, to theater and the company gained national and international attention. It dealt with communication among deaf people and the importance of teaching sign language to deaf children.

In 1979, Bove and NTD traveled on a 30,000-mile (48,000 km) world tour. Their biggest success was in Japan, where their show was attended by the royal family and they were invited to appear on a Japanese television show.

In 1991, Bove and her husband Ed Waterstreet founded Deaf West Theatre in Los Angeles, the first theater company run by deaf actors. While working with DWT, she starred in George Bernard Shaw's Saint Joan, based on Joan of Arc. The company performs plays in sign language and adjusts dialog accordingly. Signed dialog is interpreted into spoken language in order to bridge the gap between the deaf and hearing communities.

She appeared in several roles in the national tour of the Deaf West production of Big River in 2005.

Bove was also involved in a number of other projects in the Deaf community, several related to children. She had a brief role in The Land Before Time IV: when the dinosaur characters would speak, Bove would appear in a picture-in-picture box in the lower corner of the screen signing the dialog. She has also made many videos in American Sign Language such as Sign Me a Story and has starred in several productions of the play Children of a Lesser God.

=== Interpreting ===
In 2004, Bove obtained credentials as a Certified Deaf Interpreter from the Registry of Interpreters for the Deaf. Since then she has worked in that role in a variety of settings, including legal settings and White House briefings.

== Personal life ==
In 1970, Bove married Ed Waterstreet, whom she met when they both worked at the National Theatre of the Deaf.

== Filmography ==
| Year | Film | Role | Notes |
|---|---|---|---|
| 1971 | Sesame Street | Linda | TV series, 1971–2002 |
| 1973 | Search for Tomorrow | Melissa Hayley Weldon | TV series, unknown episodes |
| 1978 | Christmas Eve on Sesame Street | Linda | TV movie |
| 1979 | A Walking Tour of Sesame Street | Linda | TV movie |
| 1980 | Happy Days | Allison | TV series, one episode "Allison" |
| 1983 | Don't Eat the Pictures | Linda | TV movie |
| 1985 | Sesame Street Presents: Follow That Bird | Linda | Movie |
| 1986 | Children of a Lesser God | Marian Loesser | Movie |
| 1987 | Sign me a Story | Herself, Various Characters | Educational video featuring signed versions of fairy tales |
| 1989 | Sesame Street: 20 and Still Counting | Herself | TV special |
| 1996 | Somebody to Love | Computer | Voice only/Sign |
| 2005 | Friends to the Rescue | a fictional version of herself | Direct to video |
| 2010 | Weeds | Child Protective Services Officer | 3 episodes |
| 2019 | Sesame Street's 50th Anniversary Celebration | Linda | TV special |
| 2026 | Dark Matter (2024 TV series) | Ellie Dessen | 1 episode |

== Publications ==
In 1980, Sesame Street and the National Theatre of the Deaf collaborated on publishing a book, Sign Language Fun With Linda Bove

== Recognition ==
- Bove received an award in 1974 from AMITA, an Italian-American women's organization, in recognition for her work on television.
- 1991 - received an honorary degree from Gallaudet University
- 1992 - Bernard Bragg Artistic Achievement Award
- July 3, 2012 Bove was presented with the Media Advocacy Award in recognition of her "success in advancing the civil, human and linguistic rights of the American deaf and hard of hearing community through use of the media and social networking".
