= Reasonable Doubts =

American police drama television series

- Genre: Police procedural
- Created by: Robert Singer
- Starring: Mark Harmon; Marlee Matlin
- Theme music composer: Brad Fiedel
- Composer: Ross Levinson
- Country of origin: United States
- Original languages: English; American Sign Language
- No. of seasons: 2
- No. of episodes: 44

Production
- Executive producer: Robert Singer
- Producer: Jim Michaels
- Production locations: Chicago; Stage 27A, Warner Brothers Burbank Studios - 4000 Warner Boulevard, Burbank, California; Stage 28, Warner Brothers Burbank Studios - 4000 Warner Boulevard, Burbank, California; Stage 28A, Warner Brothers Burbank Studios - 4000 Warner Boulevard, Burbank, California
- Running time: 60 minutes
- Production companies: December 3rd Productions; Lorimar Television

Original release
- Network: NBC
- Release: September 26, 1991 – April 27, 1993

Reasonable Doubts is an American police drama television series created by Robert Singer, which broadcast in the United States by NBC that ran from September 26, 1991, to April 27, 1993.

== Synopsis ==
Reasonable Doubts is primarily about the working relationship between Assistant District Attorney Tess Kaufman (Marlee Matlin), a prosecutor very sensitive to the rights of the accused, and hard-charging, gruff Detective Dicky Cobb (Mark Harmon), an old-fashioned cop with a "bust-the-perps" attitude. The reason that these two are assigned to work together was that Cobb is one of the few available police officers who knows sign language, and Tess, like the actress who portrayed her, is deaf. Dicky is usually more frustrated by Tess' sympathy for the suspects than by her deafness; he also repeats what Tess says back to her to make sure that he understood it (Tess can also read lips) and this allowed the audience to understand her part of the dialogue. Dicky also spoke as he signed to Tess.

Both characters are romantically involved with other people when the series opens: Tess is estranged from, but still in contact with, her husband Bruce (Tim Grimm); Dicky had a manipulative girlfriend named Kay Lockman (Nancy Everhard), who is, unsurprisingly, quite jealous of Tess, and not without reason, as a considerable mutual attraction, despite their differences, has developed between Tess and Dicky. The situation becomes more complicated with the death of Kay early in the second season, freeing the characters to pursue the relationship at least somewhat, although its resolution is still up in the air when the program was not renewed for a third season. Cobb was also involved with flinty lawyer Maggie Zombro (Kay Lenz), an early continuing character who became a regular in later seasons.

Executive producer Bob Singer gained some interest from the network in spinning off the show into a straight cop drama starring Harmon and Jim Beaver, who had played Dicky's friend and partner Detective Earl Gaddis from the beginning of the show, but ultimately NBC demurred.

== Cast ==
- Mark Harmon as Detective Dickie Cobb
- Marlee Matlin as Assistant District Attorney Tess Kaufman
- William Converse-Roberts as District Attorney Arthur Gold
- Nancy Everhard as Kay Lockman
- Tim Grimm as Bruce Kaufman
- Kay Lenz as Maggie Zombro (recurring, season 1; main, season 2)
- Abraham Alvarez as Judge Augustus Triandos (recurring)

== Episodes ==
=== Series overview ===
Season	Episodes	Originally released	
Season	Episodes	First released	Last released
1	21	September 26, 1991	September 15, 1992
2	23	September 29, 1992	April 27, 1993

=== Season 1 (1991–92) ===
No. overall	No. in season	Title	Directed by	Written by	Original release date	Prod. code
1	1	"Pilot"	Robert Singer	Robert Singer	September 26, 1991	475046
2	2	"Hard Bargains"	James Quinn	Steven Phillip Smith	September 27, 1991	447202
3	3	"Making Dirt Stick"	Joe Napolitano	Kathy McCormick	October 4, 1991	447203
4	4	"Daddy's Little Girl"	Armand Mastroianni	Story by : Michael Marks & John Schulian; Teleplay by : Steven Phillip Smith & Kathy McCormick	October 18, 1991	447204
5	5	"...and Sleep Won't Come"	Bill D'Elia	John Schulian	October 25, 1991	447205
6	6	"The Silent Treatment"	Charles Robert Carner	Story by : Robert Singer & Steven Phillip Smith; Teleplay by : John Schulian & Kathy McCormick	November 1, 1991	447206
7	7	"Tangled Up in Blue"	Randall Zisk	Robert Singer & John Schulian	November 8, 1991	447207
8	8	"Aftermath"	James A. Contner	Steven Phillip Smith	November 15, 1991	447208
9	9	"One Woman's Word"	Eric Laneuville	Kathy McCormick	November 29, 1991	447209
10	10	"Graduation Day"	Robert Singer	Michael Marks	December 5, 1991	447210
11	11	"Pure Gold"	Peter Levin	John Schulian	December 13, 1991	447211
12	12	"Dicky's Got the Blues"	James Quinn	Steven Phillip Smith	December 20, 1991	447212
13	13	"The Shadow of Death"	Fred Gerber	Kathy McCormick	January 17, 1992	447213
14	14	"The Discomfort Zone"	Randy Zisk	John Schulian	February 4, 1992	447214
15	15	"Fish Out of Water"	Armand Mastroianni	Steven Smith	February 11, 1992	447215
16	16	"Burning Desire"	Richard M. Rawlings, Jr.	Kathy McCormick	March 3, 1992	447216
17	17	"Love is Strange"	Armand Mastroianni	Tracy Friedman	March 17, 1992	447217
18	18	"Home is Where the Heart is"	Bill D'Elia	Roger Lowenstein	March 17, 1992	447218
19	19	"Maggie Finds Her Soul"	Philip Sgriccia	Steven Smith	March 24, 1992	447220
20	20	"Home to Roost"	Robert Singer	Kathy McCormick	September 8, 1992	447221
21	21	"Change of Plans"	Randy Zisk	Randy Zisk	September 15, 1992	447222

=== Season 2 (1992–93) ===
No. overall	No. in season	Title	Directed by	Written by	Original release date	Prod. code
22	1	"Lifelines"	Randy Zisk	Steven Phillip Smith & Kathy McCormick	September 29, 1992	455202 455203
23	2	"Lifelines"	Randy Zisk	Steven Phillip Smith & Kathy McCormick	September 29, 1992	455202 455203
24	3	"FAP"	Robert Singer	Melissa M. Snodgrass	October 6, 1992	455201
25	4	"Moment of Doubt"	Philip Sgriccia	Barry Pullman and Melinda M. Snodgrass	October 27, 1992	455204
26	5	"Mercury in Retrograde"	Bill D'Elia	Allison Roberts	November 10, 1992	455206
27	6	"Try to Be Nice, What Does It Get You?"	Robert Singer	Kathy McCormick	November 17, 1992	455207
28	7	"Brother's Keeper"	Randy Zisk	Barry Pullman	December 1, 1992	455208
29	8	"Self Defense"	Philip Sgriccia	Steven Phillip Smith	December 8, 1992	455209
30	9	"A Rose is a Rose"	Richard M. Rawlings Jr.	Ed Zuckerman and Melinda M. Snodgrass	December 15, 1992	455210
31	10	"Silence"	David Rosenbloom	Melinda M. Snodgrass	December 22, 1992	455205
32	11	"Legacy"	Robert Singer	Melinda M. Snodgrass	January 5, 1993	455211
33	12	"Two Women"	Michael Zinberg	Sharon Elizabeth Doyle and Melinda M. Snodgrass	January 12, 1993	455212
34	13	"The Iceman"	James Hayman	David Ehrman and Melinda M. Snodgrass	January 19, 1993	455213
35	14	"Run Through the Jungle"	Robert Singer	John Schulian	January 26, 1993	447219
36	15	"Thank God, It's Friday"	Randall Zisk	Ed Zuckerman	January 26, 1993	455214
37	16	"Sister, Can You Spare a Dime?"	Philip Sgriccia	Kathy McCormick and Melinda M. Snodgrass	March 13, 1993	455215
38	17	"Crumbling Systems"	Ken Collins	Stephen Phillip Smith	March 20, 1993	455216
39	18	"Diminished Capacity"	James A. Contner	Barry Pullman and Melinda M. Snodgrass	March 27, 1993	455217
40	19	"Wish You Were Here"	Randy Zisk	Ed Zuckerman	April 3, 1993	455218
41	20	"The Ties That Bind"	Philip Sgriccia	Stephen Phillip Smith & Melinda M. Snodgrass	April 13, 1993	455219 455220
42	21	"The Ties That Bind"	Philip Sgriccia	Stephen Phillip Smith & Melinda M. Snodgrass	April 13, 1993	455219 455220
43	22	"Trust Me on This"	Bill D'Elia	Kathy McCormick & Ed Zuckerman	April 27, 1993	455221 455222
44	23	"Trust Me on This"	Bill D'Elia	Kathy McCormick & Ed Zuckerman	April 27, 1993	455221 455222

== Awards and nominations ==
Year	Award	Category	Recipient	Result
1992	American Cinema Editors' Eddie Award	Outstanding Achievement in Cinematography in Movies of the Week/Pilots	Robert Primes	Nominated
1992	Golden Globe Award	Best Actor – Television Series Drama	Mark Harmon	Nominated
1992	Golden Globe Award	Best Actress – Television Series Drama	Marlee Matlin	Nominated
1993	Golden Globe Award	Best Actor – Television Series Drama	Mark Harmon	Nominated
1993	Golden Globe Award	Best Actress – Television Series Drama	Marlee Matlin	Nominated
1992	Primetime Emmy Award	Outstanding Supporting Actress in a Drama Series	Kay Lenz	Nominated
1993	Primetime Emmy Award	Outstanding Supporting Actress in a Drama Series	Kay Lenz	Nominated
1993	Primetime Emmy Award	Outstanding Cinematography for a Series	Richard M. Rawlings Jr. (For episode "Lifelines")	Nominated
1992	Viewers for Quality Television Award	Best Actor in a Quality Drama Series	Mark Harmon	Nominated
1992	Viewers for Quality Television Award	Best Actress in a Quality Drama Series	Marlee Matlin	Nominated
1993	Viewers for Quality Television Award	Best Actor in a Quality Drama Series	Mark Harmon	Nominated
1993	Viewers for Quality Television Award	Best Actress in a Quality Drama Series	Marlee Matlin	Nominated
1993	Viewers for Quality Television Award	Best Supporting Actress in a Quality Drama Series	Kay Lenz	Won
1993	Viewers for Quality Television Award	Best Specialty Player	Leslie Jordan	Nominated
1994	Writers Guild of America Award	Episodic Drama	Ed Zuckerman (For episode "Thank God, It's Friday")	Nominated
