= Children of a Lesser God (play) =

Play written by Mark Medoff

- Playbill from the original Broadway production
- Original language: English; American Sign Language
- Written by: Mark Medoff
- Characters: Sarah Norman; James Leeds; Orin Dennis; Mr. Franklin; Mrs. Norman; Lydia; Edna Klein
- Genre: Drama

Premiere
- Date: October 25, 1979
- Place: Mark Taper Forum; Los Angeles, California

Phyllis Frelich and John Rubinstein in a scene from Children of a Lesser God

Children of a Lesser God is a play by Mark Medoff, focusing on the conflicted professional and romantic relationship between Sarah Norman, a deaf student, and her former teacher, James Leeds. It premiered at the Mark Taper Forum in 1979, and was produced on Broadway in 1980 and in the West End in 1981. It won the 1980 Tony Award for Best Play.

== Background ==
The play was specially written for the deaf actress Phyllis Frelich, based to some extent on her relationship with her husband Robert Steinberg. It was originally developed from workshops and showcased at New Mexico State University, with Frelich and Steinberg in the lead roles. It was seen by Gordon Davidson, director of the Mark Taper Forum in Los Angeles, who insisted that the male role needed to be played by a more experienced professional actor.

The title comes from Alfred, Lord Tennyson's Idylls of the King: "For why is all around us here / As if some lesser god had made the world".

== Historical casting ==
Character	1979 Los Angeles cast	1980 Broadway cast	1981 West End cast	1986 film cast	2018 Broadway revival cast
Sarah Norman	Phyllis Frelich	Phyllis Frelich	Elizabeth Quinn	Marlee Matlin	Lauren Ridloff
Mrs. Norman	Jo de Winter	Scotty Bloch	Irene Sutcliffe	Piper Laurie	Kecia Lewis
James Leeds	Robert Steinberg	John Rubinstein	Trevor Eve	William Hurt	Joshua Jackson

== Productions ==
Following a highly successful run at the Mark Taper Forum in Los Angeles, the Broadway production, directed by Gordon Davidson, opened on March 30, 1980, at the Longacre Theatre, where it ran for 887 performances. The cast included Phyllis Frelich as Sarah and John Rubinstein as James. David Ackroyd later replaced Rubinstein. Deaf actress Elizabeth Quinn later replaced Frelich, and Linda Bove, another deaf actress, known to television audiences for her more-than-30-year-long run on Sesame Street, had a successful turn in the role as well.

In 1981, the West End production ran originally at the Mermaid Theatre, then at the Albery Theatre, garnering three Olivier Awards. The production starred Trevor Eve and Elizabeth Quinn. Deaf actors from the UK were understudies, including Jean St Clair, Sarah Scott and Terry Ruane.

A Broadway revival opened on April 11, 2018, at Studio 54, directed by Kenny Leon and starring Joshua Jackson, Lauren Ridloff, John McGinty and Anthony Edwards.

== Reception ==
Reviewing a 1982 Boston production of the play, critic Carolyn Clay wrote, "Don't believe what you hear about Children of a Lesser God. This much touted, Tony Award-winning exercise in affirmative-action theater does not constitute a great play. It is a nice, rather prosaically written love story that happens to focus on a bright and defiant ‘pure deaf’ woman who marries her speech teacher yet refuses to speak. The production is unusual, however, in that it uses a deaf actress in the role of the deaf woman and two hearing-impaired performers as her hearing-impaired cohorts. This is — depending on how you choose to regard it — either the play's gimmick or its very soul. Certainly the fact that half the drama is spoken in American Sign Language — fleet and eloquent and often delightfully snide — is the only extraordinary thing about it."

== Film adaptation ==
In 1986, Medoff adapted the play for film directed by Randa Haines, starring Marlee Matlin and William Hurt.

== Awards and nominations ==
Awards

- 1980 Tony Award for Best Actor in a Play- John Rubinstein
- 1980 Tony Award for Best Play
- 1980 Drama Desk Award Outstanding Actor- John Rubinstein
- 1980 Drama Desk Award Outstanding New Play
- 1981 Laurence Olivier Award for Best New Play

=== Original Broadway production ===
Year	Award ceremony	Category	Nominee	Result
1980	Tony Award	Best Play		Won
1980	Tony Award	Best Actor in a Play	John Rubinstein	Won
1980	Tony Award	Best Actress in a Play	Phyllis Frelich	Won
1980	Tony Award	Best Direction of a Play	Gordon Davison	Nominated
1980	Drama Desk Award	Outstanding New Play		Won
1980	Drama Desk Award	Outstanding Actor in a Play	John Rubinstein	Won
1980	Drama Desk Award	Outstanding Actress in a Play	Phyllis Frelich	Nominated
1980	Drama Desk Award	Outstanding Director of a Play	Gordon Davison	Nominated
1980	Drama Desk Award	Outstanding Lighting Design	Tharon Musser	Nominated
1980	Outer Critics Circle Award	Outstanding New Broadway Play		Won
1980	Outer Critics Circle Award	Outstanding Debut Performance	Phyllis Frelich	Won

=== Original West End production ===
Year	Award ceremony	Category	Nominee	Result
1981	Laurence Olivier Award	Play of the Year		Won
1981	Laurence Olivier Award	Best Actor	Trevor Eve	Won
1981	Laurence Olivier Award	Best Actress	Elizabeth Quinn	Won

=== 2018 Broadway revival ===
Year	Award ceremony	Category	Nominee	Result
2018	Drama League Award	Outstanding Revival of a Broadway or Off-Broadway Play		Nominated
2018	Drama League Award	Distinguished Performance Award	Joshua Jackson	Nominated
2018	Drama League Award	Distinguished Performance Award	Lauren Ridloff	Nominated
2018	Tony Award	Best Actress in a Play	Lauren Ridloff	Nominated
2018	Outer Critics Circle Award	Outstanding Actress in a Play	Lauren Ridloff	Nominated
