= Marlee Matlin =

American actress (born 1965)

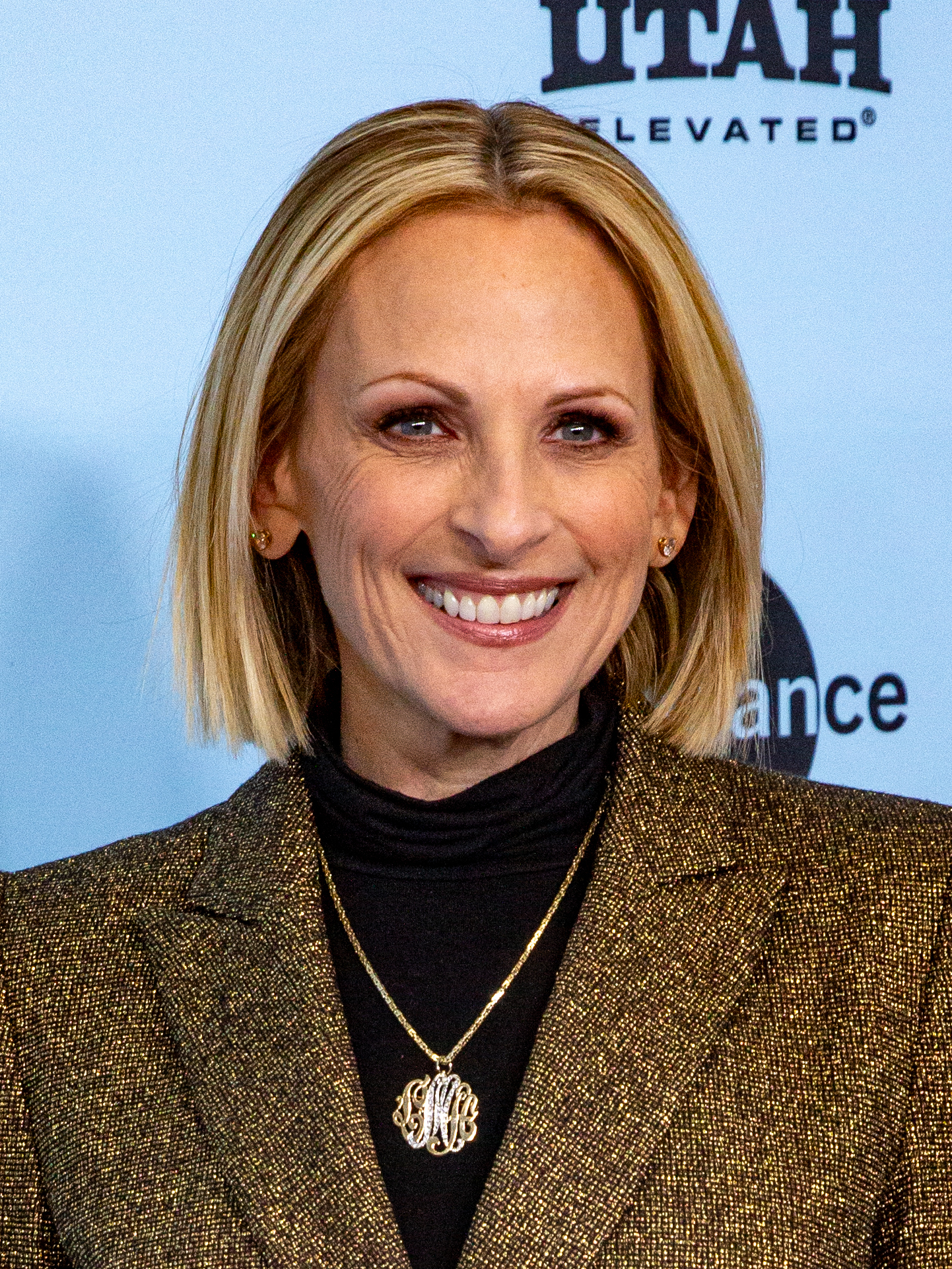
- Matlin at the 2025 Sundance Film Festival
- Born: August 24, 1965 (age 61); Morton Grove, Illinois, U.S.
- Occupations: Actress; activist
- Years active: 1986–present
- Spouse: Kevin Grandalski (m. 1993)
- Children: 4
- Awards: Full list

Marlee Matlin (born August 24, 1965) is an American actress. Having been deaf since 18 months of age, she is known for her activism on behalf of Deaf individuals in Hollywood and other industries. Her accolades include an Academy Award and a Golden Globe Award, in addition to nominations for a British Academy Film Award and four Primetime Emmy Awards. In 2009, she received a star on the Hollywood Walk of Fame.

Matlin made her acting debut playing Sarah Norman in the romantic drama film Children of a Lesser God (1986), winning the Academy Award for Best Actress and the Golden Globe Award for Best Actress in a Motion Picture – Drama. She is the first Deaf performer to win an Academy Award, the youngest winner in the Best Actress category, and one of four women to win the award for their screen debut. For playing a district attorney in the police drama series Reasonable Doubts (1991–1993), she was twice nominated for the Golden Globe Award for Best Actress – Television Series Drama. She received a nomination for the Emmy Award for Outstanding Guest Actress in a Comedy Series for her guest role in the comedy series Seinfeld (1993), and received three more nominations for Picket Fences (1993), The Practice (2000), and Law & Order: Special Victims Unit (2004–2005) in the drama category.

Matlin has primarily worked in television, as she has found more roles for Deaf actors. She played Joey Lucas on the political drama series The West Wing (2000–2006), appeared in the drama series The L Word (2007–2009) and Switched at Birth (2011–2017), and voiced Stella in the animated sitcom Family Guy (2012–2021). She made her Broadway debut in the 2015 revival of Spring Awakening. For her role in the coming-of-age film CODA (2021), she won the Screen Actors Guild Award for Outstanding Performance by a Cast in a Motion Picture.

Outside of acting, Matlin is a prominent member of the National Association of the Deaf, and her interpreter is Jack Jason. She has published four works and won recognitions for her advocacy. A documentary about her life and work, Marlee Matlin: Not Alone Anymore, was released in 2025.

== Early life ==
Matlin was born in Morton Grove, Illinois, on August 24, 1965, to Libby (née Hammer; 1930–2020) and Donald Matlin (1930–2013), who was an automobile dealer. Matlin lost all hearing in her right ear and 80% of the hearing in her left ear at the age of 18 months due to illness and fevers. In her autobiography I'll Scream Later, she suggests that her hearing loss may have been due to a genetically malformed cochlea. She is the only member of her family who is deaf. She has a sense of humor about her deafness: "Often I'm talking to people through my speakerphone, and after 10 minutes or so they say, 'Wait a minute, Marlee, how can you hear me?' They forget I have an interpreter there who is signing to me as they talk. So I say, 'You know what? I can hear on Wednesdays.'"

Matlin and her two older brothers, Eric and Marc, grew up in a Reform Jewish household. Her family roots are in Poland and Russia. Matlin attended a synagogue for the Deaf (Congregation Bene Shalom), and after studying Hebrew phonetically, was able to learn her Torah portion for her Bat Mitzvah. She was later interviewed for the book Mazel Tov: Celebrities' Bar and Bat Mitzvah Memories. She graduated from John Hersey High School in Arlington Heights and attended Harper College in Palatine, Illinois. She had planned a career in criminal justice. In her autobiography, Matlin described two instances in which she was molested: by a babysitter at age 11, and by a teacher in high school.

== Career ==
=== 1980s: Debut and film stardom ===
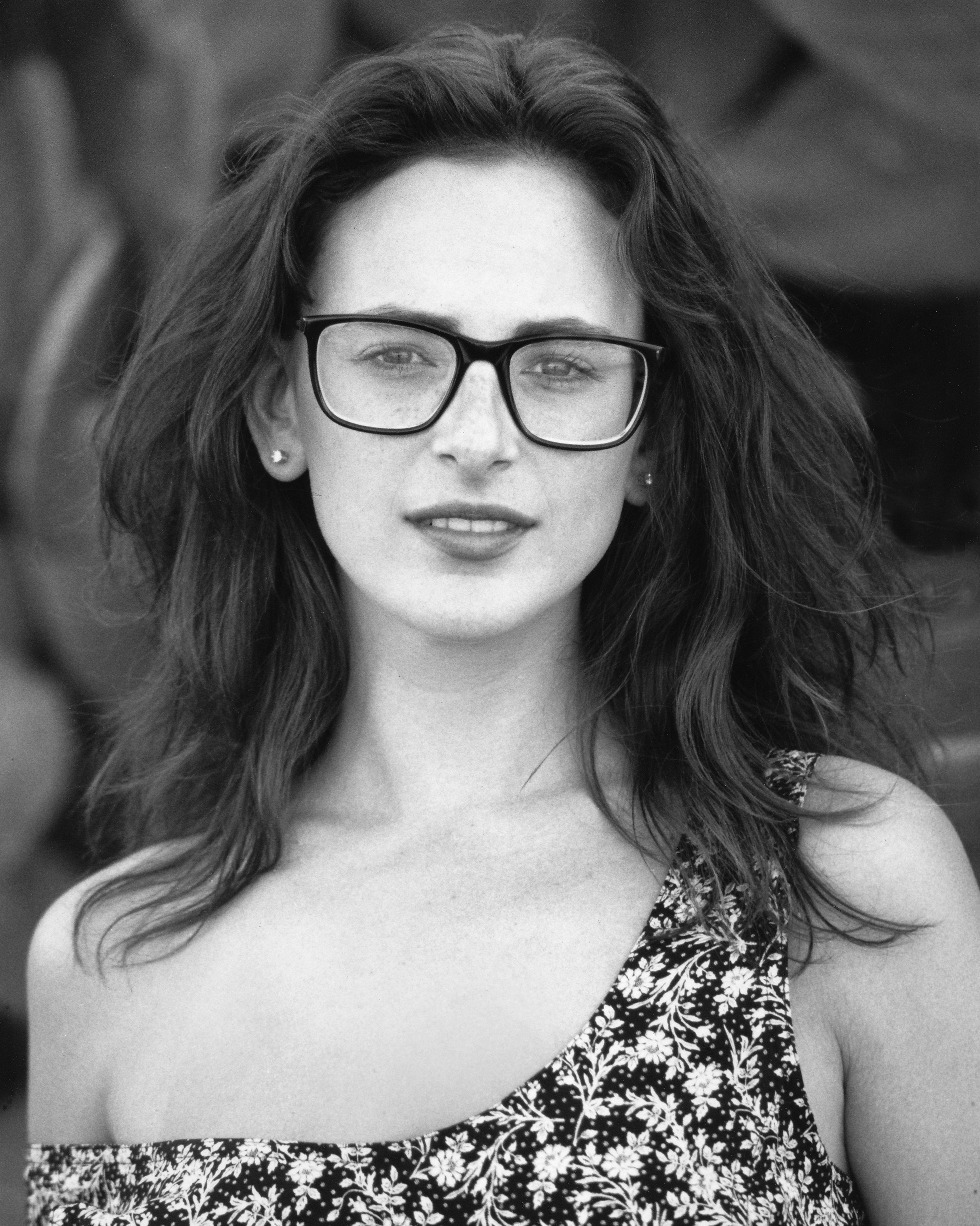
Matlin in 1989

Matlin made her stage debut at the age of seven, as Dorothy in an International Center on Deafness and the Arts (ICODA) children's theatre production of The Wizard of Oz, and continued to appear with the ICODA children's theatre group throughout her childhood. At the age of thirteen, she won second prize in the Chicago Center's Annual International Creative Arts Festival for an essay titled "If I Was not a Movie Star."

She was discovered by Henry Winkler during one of her ICODA theater performances, which ultimately led to her film debut in Children of a Lesser God (1986). The film received generally positive reviews and Matlin's performance as Sarah Norman, a reluctant-to-speak deaf woman who falls for a hearing man, drew high praise: Richard Schickel of Time magazine wrote: "[Matlin] has an unusual talent for concentrating her emotions -- and an audience's -- in her signing. But there is something more here, an ironic intelligence, a fierce but not distancing wit, that the movies, with their famous ability to photograph thought, discover in very few performances." Roger Ebert of the Chicago Sun-Times credits her with "carrying scenes with a passion and almost painful fear of being rejected and hurt, which is really what her rebellion is about," and Paul Attasanio of The Washington Post said, "The most obvious challenge of the role is to communicate without speaking, but Matlin rises to it in the same way the stars of the silent era did -- she acts with her eyes, her gestures." Children of a Lesser God brought her a Golden Globe Award for Best Actress in a Drama and an Academy Award for Best Actress. Only 21 years old at the time, Matlin remains the youngest actress to receive the Oscar in the Best Actress category. She was the only Deaf nominee and recipient in any category for 36 years until 2022, when deaf actor and filmmaker Troy Kotsur won for Best Supporting Actor for his role in CODA, in which Matlin also played a supporting role.

External videos
- Ted Koppel speaks with Gregory Hlibok, Elizabeth Zinser and Marlee Matlin on ABC's Nightline on March 9, 1988, Youtube video

Two years later, she made a guest appearance on Sesame Street with Billy Joel performing a revised version of "Just the Way You Are" with lyrics by Tony Geiss. Matlin used sign language during the song and hugged Oscar the Grouch during the song's conclusion. One year after that, Joel invited her to perform in his video for "We Didn't Start the Fire". In 1989, Matlin portrayed a Deaf widow in the television movie Bridge to Silence. In that role, she spoke in addition to using sign language. People magazine did not like the film, but praised Matlin's work, writing, "the beautiful, emotionally moving Matlin is too good for this well-intentioned but sentimental slop." Matlin attended the 1988 Oscars to present the Academy Award for Best Actor. After signing her introduction in ASL, she spoke aloud the names of the nominees and of Michael Douglas, the winner.

=== 1990s and 2000s: Acclaim in television ===
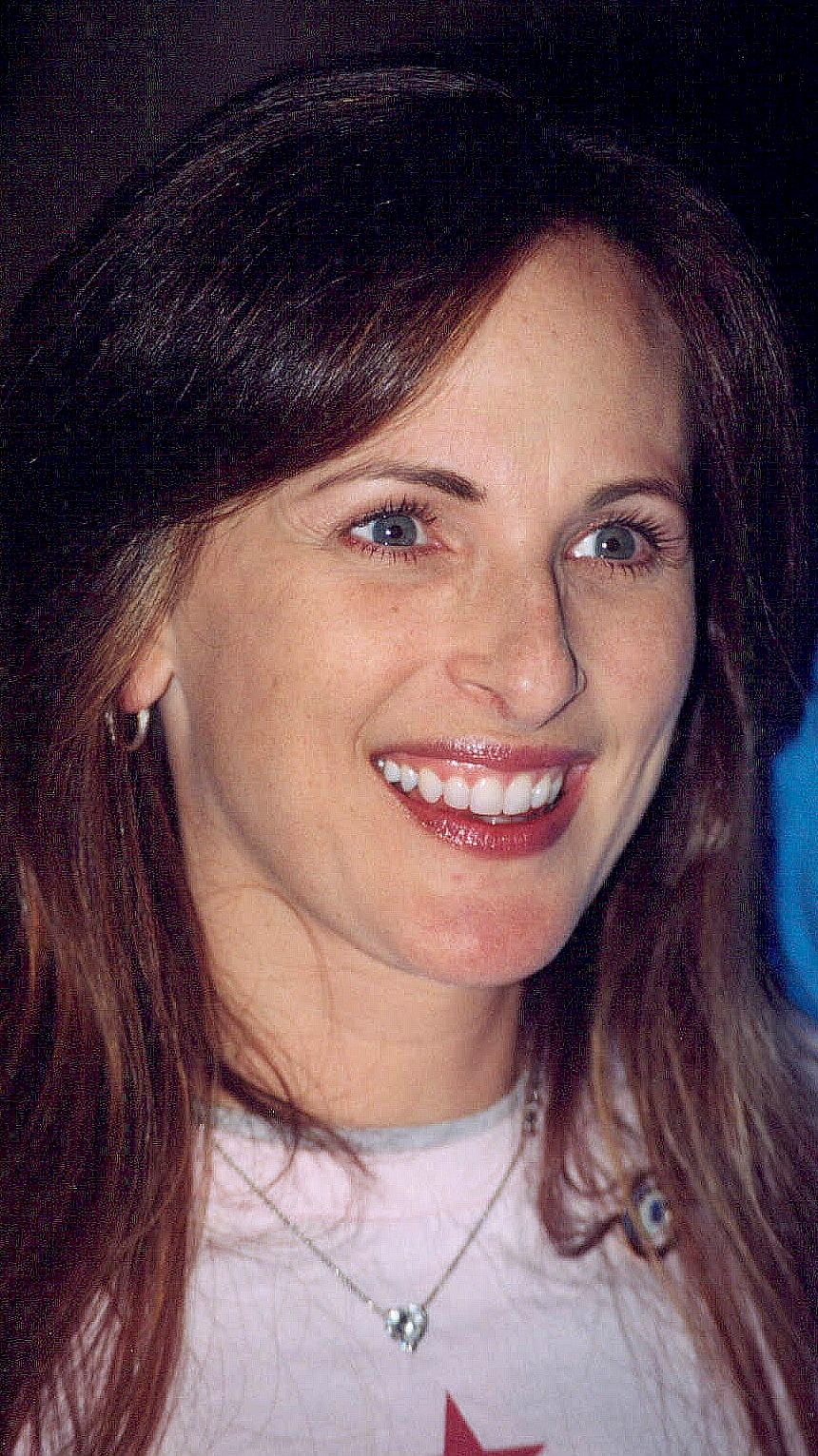
Matlin in 1999

Matlin was nominated for a Golden Globe for her work as the lead female role in the television series Reasonable Doubts (1991–1993). Matlin was nominated for an Emmy Award for a guest appearance in Picket Fences (1992) and became a regular on that series during its final season (1996). She played Carrie Buck in the 1994 television drama Against Her Will: The Carrie Buck Story, based on the 1927 United States Supreme Court case Buck v. Bell. In that role, Matlin portrayed a hearing woman for the first time in her career, which earned her a CableACE nomination for Best Actress. She had a prominent supporting role in the drama It's My Party (1996). She later had recurring roles in The West Wing, and Blue's Clues. Other television appearances include Seinfeld ("The Lip Reader"), The Outer Limits ("The Message"), ER, The Practice, and Law & Order: Special Victims Unit. She was nominated for Primetime Emmy Awards for her guest appearances in Seinfeld, Law & Order: Special Victims Unit, and The Practice.

In 2004, she hosted the 3rd Annual Festival for Cinema of the Deaf in Chicago. That same year, she also starred in the movie What the Bleep Do We Know!? as Amanda. In 2006, she played a deaf parent in Desperate Housewives. She had a recurring role in My Name Is Earl as public defender for Joy Turner (who made many jokes about Matlin's deafness at Matlin's expense), and played the mother of one of the victims in an episode of CSI: NY. That same year, Matlin was cast in season 4 of The L Word as Jodi Lerner, a lesbian sculptor and girlfriend of one of the show's protagonists, Bette Porter, played by Jennifer Beals.

On February 4, 2007, and February 7, 2016, Matlin interpreted the "Star Spangled Banner" in American Sign Language at Super Bowl XLI in Miami, Florida, and at Super Bowl 50 in Santa Clara, California, respectively. In January 2008, she appeared on Nip/Tuck as a television executive. In 2008, Matlin participated as a competitor in the sixth season of ABC's Dancing with the Stars. Her dance partner was newcomer Fabian Sanchez. Matlin and Sanchez were the sixth couple eliminated from the competition.

On May 6, 2009, Matlin received a star on the Hollywood Walk of Fame. On November 8, 2009, Matlin appeared on Seth & Alex's Almost Live Comedy Show, hosted by Seth MacFarlane and Alex Borstein. After Borstein imitated Matlin calling MovieFone and singing "Poker Face," Matlin herself appeared and launched into a comical tirade against Borstein over being made fun of, and how she was not invited to provide her own voice for Family Guy. Matlin went on to voice Stella, Peter Griffin's coworker, in the Season 10 episode "The Blind Side". Stella later became a recurring character.

=== 2010s and 2020s: Broadway debut and expansion ===
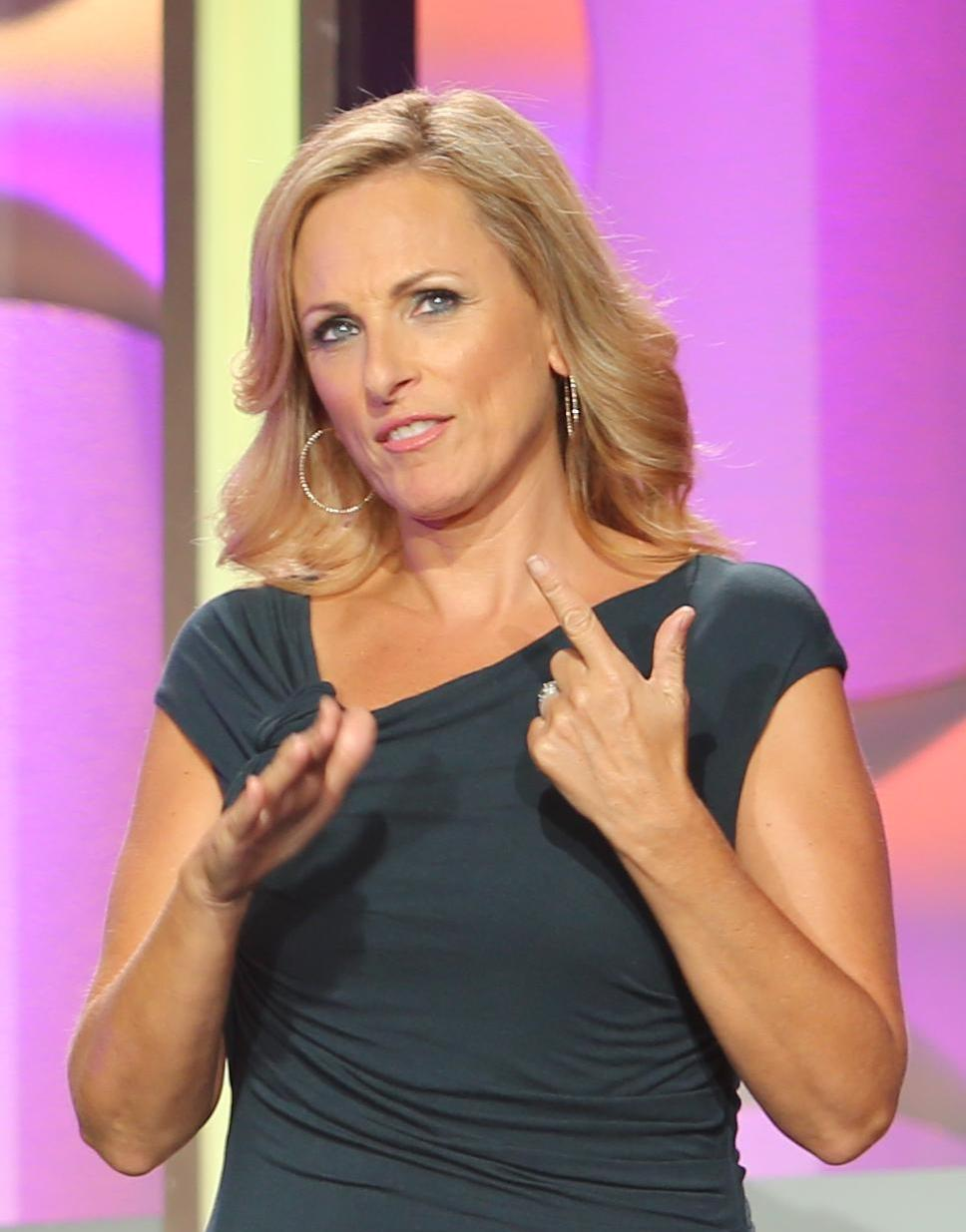
Matlin as one of the presenters at the 2014 AHA Hero Dog Awards

In 2010, Matlin produced a pilot for a reality show she titled My Deaf Family, which she presented to various national network executives. Although they expressed interest, no network purchased rights to the show. On March 29, 2010, Matlin uploaded the pilot to YouTube and launched a viral marketing campaign. Matlin played the recurring character of Melody Bledsoe on Switched at Birth. In 2013, Matlin played herself in No Ordinary Hero: The SuperDeafy Movie. In September 2015, she made her Broadway debut in the revival production of the musical Spring Awakening.

Beginning in 2017, Matlin played the recurring role of Harriet on the Syfy television series, The Magicians. On July 31, 2017, it was announced by Deadline that Matlin joined as a series regular in the third season of the ABC thriller Quantico. She starred in the role of ex-FBI agent Jocelyn Turner. In 2019, Matlin was mentioned in an article by Hearing Like Me as somebody that could bring more #DeafTalent to "Life and Deaf," a new comedy show set in the 1970s that aims to explore the life of a kid with deaf parents. This show was to be executive produced by Matlin according to Deadline.

In 2021, Matlin appeared in CODA, an American comedy-drama film that follows a hearing teenage girl who is a child of deaf adults (CODA for short). The film stars Emilia Jones as the hearing girl, with Matlin and Troy Kotsur as her culturally Deaf parents and Daniel Durant as her deaf brother; the role won her the SAG Award for Best Ensemble. On October 3, 2022, Matlin appeared in the "Mail Time" section of the episode, "Blue's Storytime with Camila" on the Blue's Clues sequel, Blue's Clues & You!.

== Activism ==
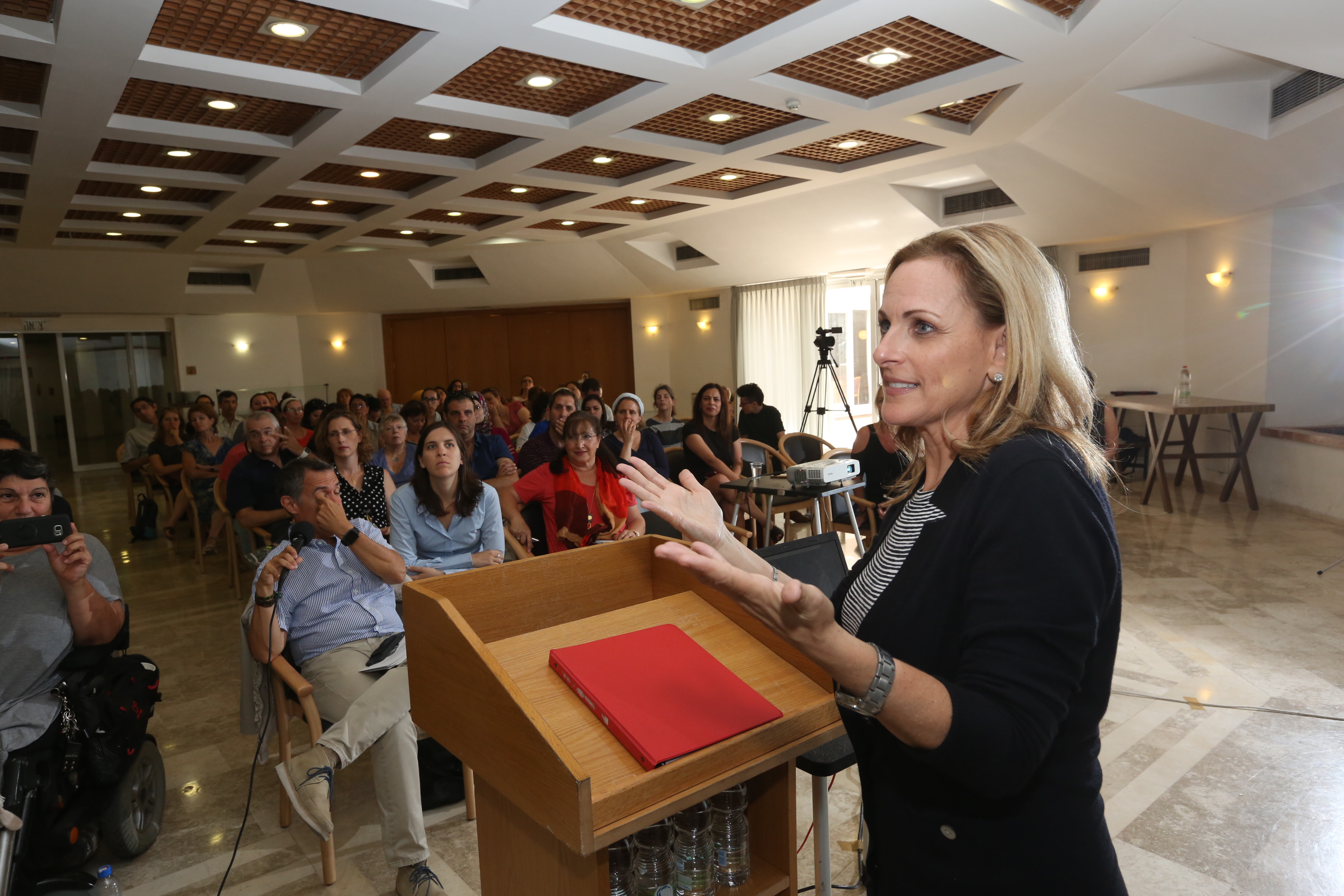
Matlin speaking at the Hebrew University of Jerusalem in 2017

Matlin is actively involved with charitable organizations such as Easter Seals (where she was appointed an Honorary board member), the Children Affected by AIDS Foundation, Elizabeth Glaser Pediatric AIDS Foundation, VSA arts, and the Red Cross Celebrity Cabinet. She has been a strong advocate for the rights of Deaf people, accepting television roles only if producers commit to caption the films, remaining openminded and respectful of both signed and spoken communication preferences, and promoting telephone equipment specifically designed for deaf persons. She has testified before the Senate Committee on Labor and Human Resources in support of the establishment of the National Institute on Deafness and Communication Disorders. Matlin has also been active in the fight against AIDS, the "Victory Awards" for the National Rehabilitation Hospital, and other causes. She is also a lifetime member of Hadassah Women's Zionist Organization of America. Matlin has been a frequent guest narrator at Disney's Candlelight Processional at Walt Disney World. Matlin received an honorary Doctorate of Humane Letters degree from Gallaudet University in 1987. In 1988, Matlin received the Samuel S. Beard Award for Greatest Public Service by an Individual 35 Years or Under, an award given out annually by Jefferson Awards. In 1991, Matlin received the Bernard Bragg Young Artists Achievement Award at the Annual International Creative Arts Festival sponsored by the Center on Deafness in Chicago. Matlin was appointed by President Bill Clinton in 1994 as a member of the board of directors of the Corporation for National and Community Service and served as chair of National Volunteer Week. Matlin was a participant in the first-ever national television advertising campaign supporting donations to Jewish federations. The program featured "film and television personalities celebrating their Jewish heritage and promoting charitable giving to the Jewish community" and included Greg Grunberg, Joshua Malina, Kevin Weisman, and Jonathan Silverman.

In October 2007, she was appointed to the Gallaudet University board of trustees. On July 26, 2010, Matlin signed a speech at an event commemorating the 20th anniversary of the Americans with Disabilities Act. In the following year, Matlin was a finalist on the NBC show The Celebrity Apprentice, competing to win money for her charity, The Starkey Hearing Foundation, finishing in second place. However, on one episode of The Celebrity Apprentice, "The Art of the Deal", which was transmitted on April 3, 2011, raised $986,000 for charity. Donald Trump, who was then hosting The Celebrity Apprentice, donated an additional $14,000 to make the contribution an even million.

As of January 2015, Matlin acts as the ACLU's celebrity ambassador for disability rights. As a "celebrity ambassador" for the ACLU, in attempts to bridge the gap between law enforcement and the deaf community, Matlin discussed the communication barriers when deaf individuals are stopped by the police. In recognition of her philanthropic work and her advocacy for the inclusion of people with disabilities, Matlin received the 2016 Morton E. Ruderman Award in Inclusion, a $120,000 prize given annually by Jay Ruderman of the Ruderman Family Foundation to one individual whose work excels at promoting disability inclusion. She won the Henry Viscardi Achievement Awards for disability advocacy in 2014.

== Personal life ==
Matlin married Burbank police officer Kevin Grandalski on August 29, 1993, at the home of friend and fellow actor Henry Winkler. The couple first met while she was filming a scene from Reasonable Doubts outside the studio grounds; the police department had assigned Grandalski to provide security and control traffic. They have four children: Sarah (born 1996), Brandon (born 2000), Tyler (born 2002), and Isabelle (born 2003).

In 2002, Matlin published her first novel, titled Deaf Child Crossing, which was loosely based on her own childhood. She later wrote and published a sequel titled Nobody's Perfect, produced on stage at the John F. Kennedy Center for the Performing Arts in partnership with VSA Arts in October 2007.

Matlin's memoir, I'll Scream Later, was published in April 2009. In the book, she writes about her drug abuse and how it drove her to check herself into the Betty Ford Center. She discusses her rocky, two-year relationship with her significantly older Children of a Lesser God co-star William Hurt, who she says physically abused and raped her. She also discusses the sexual abuse she suffered as a child at the hands of her female babysitter.

In 2025, Matlin was the subject of Marlee Matlin: Not Alone Anymore, a documentary film revolving around her life and career, directed by Shoshannah Stern, which had its world premiere at the 2025 Sundance Film Festival. On June 15, 2026, Matlin was the commencement speaker for the 2025-2026 graduates of the University of Oregon in Eugene, Oregon that included her youngest daughter.

== Works and accolades ==
Following her breakout role in Children of a Lesser God, Matlin has made occasional film appearances (mostly due to lack of substantial roles for deaf actors), but has focused most of her work in television. She won the Academy Award for Best Actress for Children of a Lesser God. She was the only deaf performer to have won an Academy Award until 2022, when Troy Kotsur received the award for Best Supporting Actor for CODA, in which Matlin also starred. Matlin received a star on the Hollywood Walk of Fame in 2009.

== Published works ==
- Matlin, Marlee (2004). Deaf Child Crossing. New York: Simon & Schuster. ISBN 978-0689866968.
- Matlin, Marlee; Cooney, Doug (2007). Leading Ladies. New York: Simon & Schuster. ISBN 978-0689869877.
- Matlin, Marlee; Cooney, Doug (2007). Nobody's Perfect. New York: Simon & Schuster. ISBN 978-1416949763.
- Matlin, Marlee (2009). I'll Scream Later. New York: Simon Spotlight Entertainment. ISBN 978-1439102855.

== See also ==
- List of Academy Award records
- List of oldest and youngest Academy Award winners and nominees
- List of Jewish Academy Award winners and nominees
- List of actors with Academy Award nominations
