= List of Deaf films =

This is a list of films that reflect the criteria of the Deaf cinema movement: written, produced or directed by deaf people with leading deaf actors. All these works have a tendency to nurture and develop the culture's self image and to reflect correctly the core of the Deaf culture and language.

== List of films ==
| Film | Year | Description |
|---|---|---|
| A Scene at the Sea | 1991 | A deaf garbage collector happens upon a broken and discarded surfboard. The discovery plants in him dreams of becoming a surf champion. Encouraged by his also deaf girlfriend, he persists against all odds |
| A Silent Agreement | 2017 | The Australian romantic drama features an LGBT couple, a profoundly deaf human rights activist and his filmmaker boyfriend with a speech impediment, as their intellectual property is stolen by a film industry mentor. This was the first film to feature Auslan in its main dialogue. Some scenes are entirely in Auslan. Deaf actors Joshua Sealy, Luke Watts and Matthew Archibald appear in this film. |
| Sign Gene: The First Deaf Superheroes | 2017 | The Italian and American superhero film features Deaf superheroes that can create superhuman powers through the use of Sign language. The story centres on a Deaf agent from New York City carrier of a powerful genetic mutation sent to Japan with his colleague to investigate the various intriguing crimes committed by Japanese Deaf mutants. Written, produced and directed by and with Deaf people (played by Deaf actors, Emilio Insolera, Ben Bahan, Carola Insolera) |
| The Tribe | 2014 | A deaf boy joins a boarding school for similar children. Confronted by the violent and criminal antics of some of the other boys and girls, he struggles to conform and join the 'tribe'. There are no speaking roles. All dialog is presented in Ukrainian sign language. |
| Lake Windfall | 2013 | The American independent film features five friends, three deaf, who go on a camping trip that becomes a disaster. |
| No Ordinary Hero: The SuperDeafy Movie | 2013 | The American independent comedy-drama film features a Deaf actor who plays a superhero on a TV show. He meets a Deaf boy and works to inspire him. |
| Universal Signs | 2008 | The American drama film features a deaf artist who blames himself for the death of his fiancée's daughter and struggles to recover. |
| Country of the Deaf | 1998 | The Russian film features two women, one who is a deaf-mute dancer and one who is fleeing from the mafia. |
| Think Me Nothing | 1975 | ref. |
| Deafula | 1975 | The horror film about a Deaf vampire is the first full-length feature film made in American Sign Language. |

== List of documentaries ==
| Film | Year | Description |
|---|---|---|
| See What I'm Saying: The Deaf Entertainers Documentary | 2009 | The American documentary film explores the careers of four deaf entertainers: standup comic CJ Jones, actor Robert DeMayo whose HIV-positive status impacts him, drummer Bob Hiltermann of the all-deaf band Beethoven's Nightmare, and singer and actress TL Forsberg. |
| Sound and Fury | 2000 | The American documentary film features two brothers, one deaf and one hearing, with their families. The deaf brother has a deaf wife and a deaf daughter. While he opposes cochlear implants, his daughter wants one. The hearing brother has a hearing wife, and the couple have a deaf baby for whom they explore the option of cochlear implants. The film explores the relationship between the culturally deaf community and cochlear implants. One of the four producers is deaf. |

== Online Database ==
The Deaf Movie Database (DMDb) is an online platform that catalogs films, television series, and media content featuring deaf actors, sign language, and themes centered on deaf culture. Created by Emilio Insolera, the database serves as a valuable resource for filmmakers, audiences, and researchers interested in representation, accessibility, and inclusivity within the entertainment industry.

== See also ==
- List of films featuring the deaf and hard of hearing
- Deaf Movie Database

== Bibliography ==
- Lane, Harlan L.; Hoffmeister, Robert J.; Bahan, Benjamin J. (1996). A Journey into the Deaf-World. DawnSignPress. p. 152. ISBN 978-0-915035-63-2.
- Schuchman, John S. (1999). Hollywood Speaks: Deafness and the Film Entertainment Industry. University of Illinois Press. ISBN 978-0-252-06850-8.
