= Deaf cinema =

Films produced and led by Deaf creatives

Deaf cinema is a movement that includes all works produced and directed by deaf people or members of the deaf community and is led by deaf actors. All these works have a tendency to nurture and develop the culture's self image and to reflect correctly the core of the Deaf culture and language.

== Deaf Cinema vs Cinema of the deaf ==
"Deaf cinema" is a movement that dissociates from the "Cinema of the deaf". “The two are worlds apart" while the Cinema of the deaf is "a mainstream cinema in need of character types as grist for its mercantile mill", the Deaf Cinema is "an outsider cinema serving to nurture and develop a culture's self-image”.

=== Cinema of the deaf ===
The "Cinema of the deaf" includes any film where the deafness is the main subject but is written or directed by anyone without questioning its relationship or knowledge about the deaf culture or language. It also includes any film that is played by hearing actors for deaf roles pretending to know sign language. Or by deaf people that do not know sign language and quickly learn it making it look ridiculous. Often these films contain erroneous messages such as negative stereotypes, continued misrepresentations or incorrect usage of the sign language and "are letting deaf people down"

In regard to deaf performers, the #DeafTalent movement spread across social media in 2015. "Using this hashtag, members of the Deaf community publicly spoke out against the cultural appropriation of deafness in movies and TV" "Deaf parts belong to deaf performers — people who understand the experience of hearing loss and can accurately portray deaf characters. Just as blackface is not an acceptable way to depict a black character, having a non-deaf actor pretend to be deaf is irresponsible, unethical, and offensive." However the challenge remains since the scripts are written by those who are not actually familiar to the deaf culture and language and then it is in the hands of hearing directors, who have received the right budget for the production from big production houses, thus often the deaf actors are found themselves in a dilemma when they find the script does not align with the deaf cores.

"Deaf people’s culture and experiences have long been appropriated for the fascination and entertainment of others, and in the process kneaded into a bastardisation bearing no resemblance to real-life experiences, because it is rare that deaf people are actually involved in the production process" explains Rebecca Atkinson in The Guardian "but films and TV shows about deaf characters, told through a hearing lens are demeaning, depressing and cause more damage then good" In 2013 a deaf storyline on BBC1 "caused outrage among deaf viewers, with the depiction of the nine-year-old daughter of a deaf man (this time played by a deaf actor) interpret complex medical information about his upcoming heart surgery". As one deaf blogger said: “5.3 million viewers will now think that deaf people should be looked after by our kids.”

=== Deaf Cinema ===
"Deaf Cinema" emerges as a response to the continued misrepresentations of the deaf in the media. It includes films written, produced or directed by deaf people whose leading actors are deaf. Thanks to the advent of the digital technology in 2000s, there has been a rise of various short film productions by and with deaf people, formation of deaf film production companies and deaf film festivals. Computer software has made filmmaking more affordable and the proliferation of internet and the ability to stream in sign language freely and internationally has contributed to an increase in Deaf Cinema. Lately there has been an increase of long feature films as well.

The following films have been directed by deaf directors: Deafula (1975), Think Me Nothing (1975), See What I'm Saying: The Deaf Entertainers Documentary (2009), Lake Windfall (2013), No Ordinary Hero: The SuperDeafy Movie (2013) and Sign Gene (2017).

Film	Year	Description
Lake Windfall	2013	The film is a portrait of interactions between deaf, hard of hearing, and hearing people. The plot focuses on five characters in a post-apocalyptic setting. Director by Roger Vass Jr.
A Silent Agreement	2017	An Australian LGBT romance/drama directed by Davo Hardy, who also stars as a writer with a speech impediment, who falls in love with a profoundly deaf human rights activist (played by profoundly-deaf actor Joshua Sealy), who teaches him how to sign. This treats his speech impediment and together, they adapt their story into a screenplay. However their film industry mentor (played by Australian veteran actor Paul Mercurio) steals their idea for his own selfish gain. This was the first film to feature Auslan (Australian Sign Language) as a main language for the film's dialogue.
Sign Gene	2017	The Italian and American superhero film features Deaf superheroes that can create superhuman powers through the use of Sign language. The story centres on a Deaf agent from New York City (played by deaf actor Emilio Insolera) carrier of a powerful genetic mutation sent to Japan with his colleague to investigate the various intriguing crimes committed by Japanese Deaf mutants.
No Ordinary Hero: The SuperDeafy Movie	2013	The American independent comedy-drama film features a Deaf actor who plays a superhero on a TV show. He meets a Deaf boy and works to inspire him.
See What I'm Saying: The Deaf Entertainers Documentary	2009	The American documentary film explores the careers of four deaf entertainers: standup comic CJ Jones, actor Robert DeMayo whose HIV-positive status impacts him, drummer Bob Hiltermann of the all-deaf band Beethoven's Nightmare, and singer and actress TL Forsberg.
Deafula	1975	The horror film about a Deaf vampire is the first full-length feature film made in American Sign Language.
Think Me Nothing	1975	Explores the adventures of a young deaf man and his friends in southern California.

== Online Database ==
The Deaf Movie Database (DMDb) is an online platform that catalogs films, television series, and media content featuring deaf actors, sign language, and themes centered on deaf culture. Created by Emilio Insolera, the database serves as a valuable resource for filmmakers, audiences, and researchers interested in representation, accessibility, and inclusivity within the entertainment industry.

== Bibliography ==
- Lane, Harlan L.; Hoffmeister, Robert J.; Bahan, Benjamin J. (1996). A Journey into the Deaf-World. DawnSignPress. p. 152. ISBN 978-0-915035-63-2.
- Schuchman, John S. (1999). Hollywood Speaks: Deafness and the Film Entertainment Industry. University of Illinois Press. ISBN 978-0-252-06850-8.
