= List of films featuring the deaf and hard of hearing =

There is a body of films that feature the deaf and hard of hearing. The Encyclopedia of Film Themes, Settings and Series wrote, "The world of the deaf has received little attention in film. Like blindness... it has been misused as a plot gimmick in syrupy romances." Miriam Nathan Lerner, writing in M/C Journal: A Journal of Media and Cultures, said that films featuring deaf and hard of hearing characters rarely focus on deafness itself but rather use it to advance the story or to help understand hearing characters. She said, "Films shape and reflect cultural attitudes and can serve as a potent force in influencing the attitudes and assumptions of those members of the hearing world who have had few, if any, encounters with deaf people." She identified various classifications behind the representation of deafness in film: deafness as a plot device, as a metaphor, as a symbolic commentary on society, or as a psychosomatic response to trauma; deaf characters as protagonist informants or as parallels to the protagonist, et cetera.

== List of films ==
Film	Year	Description
A Scene at the Sea	1991	A deaf garbage collector happens upon a broken and discarded surfboard. The discovery plants in him dreams of becoming a surf champion. Encouraged by his also deaf girlfriend, he persists against all odds
A Silent Agreement	2017	A profoundly deaf man encourages his new boyfriend, an aspiring writer/actor grappling with a speech impediment, to pursue his entertainment career, though they face abuse from an industry mentor, played by Paul Mercurio.
The Legend of the Mountain Man	2008	Three deaf kids camp in their grandparents' lodge and embark on journey to uncover the mystery of the Mountain man.
The Voiceless Message	1911	Adele DeGarde portrays a deaf orphaned girl adopted by a hearing couple. The family undertakes sign language from J. Schuyler Long's The Sign Language (1910). The mother is cornered by a burglar, who hides behind the bedstead when the father approaches. She makes signs to her husband that there is a "robber"; he fires a pistol into the furniture, and the burglar drops dead. Directed by William V. Ranous.
A Silent Voice	2016	The Japanese anime film features a young hearing man who tracks down a deaf signing woman whom he had bullied in elementary school to try make amends with her.
All About Steve	2009	American romantic comedy features a subplot involving a group of deaf children (played by a group of deaf child actors) who fall into a mineshaft and need to be rescued; Mary (Sandra Bullock) accidentally falls in herself, and discovers a child (played by deaf child actress Delaney Hamilton) who has been left behind, and helps her to be rescued. Deaf actor Tyrone Giordano also appears in the film in a small role as the father of one of the deaf children.
All the Silence	2023	Mexican drama about an actress and sign language teacher who learns she will soon become deaf, and struggles to accept this, despite her deaf parents, friends, and girlfriend.
Amy	1981	A hearing woman leaves her domineering hearing husband after the death of their deaf child. She becomes a teacher at a school for the deaf.
Adventures of Power	2008	In the quest to become the world's greatest air-drummer, a small-town dreamer must overcome obstacles and ridicule to save the day.
And Now Tomorrow	1944	
Audible (short)	2021	Football player Amaree McKenstry-Hall and his Maryland School for the Deaf teammates attempt to defend their winning streak while coming to terms with the tragic loss of a close friend.
Babel	2006	In one of the film's sub-stories, a deaf Japanese high school girl (played by hearing actress Rinko Kikuchi) who knows Japanese Sign Language struggles with her hearing mother's death and engages in sexual behavior with hearing men of different ages.
Baby Driver	2017	Action film in which the hearing but tinnitus-struck protagonist (Ansel Elgort) who works as a getaway driver has a deaf foster father (played by deaf actor CJ Jones).
Bangkok Dangerous	1999	Thai thriller film set in Bangkok, in which a deaf hitman succeeds in his occupation because he does not react to gunfire.
Bangkok Dangerous	2008	The American remake of the 1999 Thai film of the same name stars a white American hitman in Bangkok who has a deaf girlfriend.
Barfi!	2012	Based in the 1970s in Darjeeling and Kolkata, the film is about Barfi Johnson (Ranbir Kapoor), a deaf and mute young boy who develops a special bond with two young girls Shruti Ghosh (Ileana D'Cruz) and Jhilmil Chatterjee (Priyanka Chopra).
Batman Forever	1995	In this superhero sequel, a bank security guard (played by hearing actor Joe Grifasi), who wears a hearing aid, is held captive by Two-Face. The guard and Batman are trapped in the bank's vault as it fills with acid; Batman uses the guard's hearing aid to help him open the vault's lock and free them both.
Beethoven's Great Love	1937	Lyrical biography of the classical composer, depicted as a romantic hero, an accursed artist.
The Bélier Family (French: La Famille Bélier)	2014	In the French film, the hearing daughter of a deaf couple discovers that she has a singing talent.
Black	2005	The Hindi film features a deaf-blind student and her alcoholic teacher.
Beyond Silence (German: Jenseits der Stille)	1996	The German film features a hearing daughter of deaf parents who seeks independence from her family and meets another child of deaf adults (CODA) and falls in love with him.
Bohemian Rhapsody	2018	In this biopic of Freddie Mercury, the father of his one-time fiancée Mary Austin is deaf (played by deaf actor Neil Fox-Roberts) and converses in sign language.
Boy Kills World	2023	Action film about a deaf-mute man (played by hearing actor Bill Skarsgård) who avenges the murder of his family.
Bratz	2007	One of the main characters, Yasmin, falls in love with Dylan, a deaf football player at the same school.
Break Up	1998	
Bridge to Silence	1989	In the American TV film, a deaf woman recovers from a car crash, caused by a drunk driver, that kills her husband. Her hearing daughter is looked after by her hearing mother.
Causeway	2022	The drama contains a scene where the main (hearing) character visits her deaf, incarcerated brother (played by deaf actor Russell Harvard) in prison, where they communicate through ASL.
Children of a Lesser God	1986	In the drama film, a speech teacher falls in love with a deaf girl (played by deaf actress Marlee Matlin) at a school for the deaf in New England. The film was Matlin's debut, and she won an Academy Award for her performance.
Close to You	2023	Drama about a trans man (played by Elliot Page) returning home for a family reunion, and reconnects with an old deaf friend (played by deaf actor Hillary Baack).
CODA	2021	The English-language film, a remake of the 2014 French-language film La Famille Bélier, features a hearing teenage girl who is a child of deaf adults (CODA for short), having culturally Deaf parents and brother.
Code Unknown	2000	In the French- and Romanian-language film, three hearing characters' lives intersect. One of the characters is a teacher at a school for deaf children, and one of his students is his little sister.
Compensation	1999	The film features two love stories set in Chicago – one at the turn of the 20th century, the other in contemporary times. Both feature a deaf woman and a hearing man, played by Michelle A. Banks and John Earl Jelks, respectively.
Concerto for Abigail	2024	American romantic drama about a world-renowned pianist (played by hearing actor Monica Young) who falls in love shortly after discovering she has hearing loss that will eventually make her deaf.
Copying Beethoven	2006	Fictionalised biopic of Ludwig van Beethoven (played by hearing actor Ed Harris) in his final years, as a student aids the deaf composer.
Country of the Deaf	1998	The Russian film features two women; one is a deaf dancer, the other is fleeing from the mafia.
Crazy Moon	1987	The Canadian coming-of-age film features a hearing boy (Kiefer Sutherland) who falls in love with a deaf girl (Vanessa Vaughan) and attempts to woo her.
Creed	2015	While trying to follow in his late father's footsteps by training with Rocky Balboa (Sylvester Stallone), the estranged son of Apollo Creed, Adonis Johnson-Creed (Michael B. Jordan), falls in love with a musician with progressive hearing loss named Bianca Taylor (played by hearing actress Tessa Thompson).
Creed II	2018	Adonis (Michael B. Jordan) seeks revenge for his father's demise in a son-on-son fight against Viktor Drago. Bianca (Tessa Thompson) births a daughter who inherits her deafness.
Creed III	2023	Continues the story of Adonis (Michael B. Jordan) and Bianca (Tessa Thompson) as they continue to raise their deaf daughter (played by deaf actress Mila Davis-Kent), while Adonis confronts a former childhood friend.
Dead Silence	1997	The American hostage drama, set in upstate New York, follows three hearing escaped convicts who hold hostage a bus of deaf students and a deaf teacher (played by deaf actress Marlee Matlin).
Deaf (or Sorda)	2025	The drama film features a deaf actress Miriam Garlo, who portrays Ángela, a deaf woman, who is expecting a child with her hearing partner, Héctor.
Deaf Smith & Johnny Ears (or Los Amigos)	1973	The Spaghetti Western film features a deaf-mute gunfighter (played by hearing actor Anthony Quinn) who does not speak or sign; his partner, a hearing man, acts as his ears.
Deafula	1975	The horror film about a Deaf vampire is the first full-length feature film with dialogue exclusively in American Sign Language.
Dear Frankie	2004	The British drama film, directed by Shona Auerbach, features a nine-year-old deaf boy (played by hearing actor Jack McElhone) and his hearing mother, who are on the run. The boy wants to meet his father, but the mother wants to prevent this since her husband caused the boy's hearing loss at a young age.
Dig	2022	American thriller about a father (Thomas Jane) and his deaf daughter (Harlow Jane) that are taken hostage.
Dummy	1979	The CBS television film, based on a book about a 1965 legal case, features an illiterate young deaf black man being charged for the murder of a prostitute. He is defended by a hard-of-hearing lawyer. The accused was played by LeVar Burton, and the lawyer was played by Paul Sorvino; both actors are hearing.
Eternals	2021	In the superhero film set in the Marvel Cinematic Universe, deaf actress Lauren Ridloff portrays the superhuman Makkari. She is the first deaf superhero in the MCU.
Extraction 2	2023	American action sequel features crime lord Zurab (played by hearing actor Tornike Gogrichiani), who wears a hearing aid after being beaten by his father in childhood, and has tinnitus that manifests as auditory hallucinations.
The Family Stone	2005	The American dramedy film features a New England family who has a deaf son (played by deaf actor Ty Giordano). They communicate with him in American Sign Language.
Feel the Beat	2020	A dance film featuring a small-town dance team with a deaf dancer (played by deaf actress Shaylee Mansfield), and she communicates with her team in American Sign Language.
Feeling Through	2019	A homeless teen bonds with a deafblind man.
Flesh and Fury	1952	
For the First Time	1959	Romantic musical where an operatic tenor (Mario Lanza) who finds love with a deaf German woman (played by hearing actress Johanna von Koczian).
Forgiveness	2021	Horror film about three women who wake up in a hospital blind, deaf, and mute respectively, and must work together to figure a way out of their predicament.
Four Weddings and a Funeral	1994	The British romantic comedy film, directed by Mike Newell and written by Richard Curtis, features a hearing protagonist (played by Hugh Grant) who has a deaf brother (played by deaf actor David Bower).
Freddy's Dead: The Final Nightmare	1991	In this horror sequel, one of the teens, Carlos, is deaf in one ear after being physically abused by his mother. Freddy Krueger later attacks him in his dreams by making his hearing aid extremely sensitive to noise.
Fuzz	1972	American action comedy film features hearing actor Yul Brynner as master criminal The Deaf Man, a recurring character in the series of novels on which the film is based.
Gas Food Lodging	1992	The American drama film features a hearing female protagonist who gets a new hearing boyfriend and meets his deaf mother.
Godzilla vs. Kong	2021	In the monster movie featuring Godzilla and King Kong, a deaf girl (played by deaf actor Kaylee Hottle) forms a bond with Kong on Skull Island, communicating to him with sign language.
Godzilla x Kong: The New Empire	2024	Kaylee Hottle reprises her role as a young girl who communicates with King Kong and other characters in sign language.
The Good Shepherd	2006	In the American spy film, the hearing protagonist (played by Matt Damon) enters a relationship with a deaf woman (played by hearing actor Tammy Blanchard). He leaves her after impregnating a hearing woman (played by Angelina Jolie), whom he eventually marries.
Grand Canyon	1991	The American drama film features an ensemble cast, including a hearing father (played by Danny Glover) who maintains a long-distance relationship with his deaf daughter by using a telecommunications device for the deaf.
The Hammer	2010	The American biographical film features the deaf wrestler Matt Hamill, played by deaf actor Russell Harvard.
Hear and Now	2007	The American documentary film, produced by HBO, features the director's deaf parents going through cochlear implant surgery at 65 years old.
The Hearing	2024	Philippine legal drama features a court case of a 12-year old mute and deaf boy (played by hearing actor Enzo Osorio) who was sexually abused by a priest. The film also had Jose Steffan a relay interpretator played by deaf actor, Rome Mallari.
Hear No Evil	1993	In the American thriller film, a deaf marathon runner (played by deaf actor Marlee Matlin) discovers a valuable coin and is pursued by hearing criminals.
The Heart Is a Lonely Hunter	1968	The American melodrama film, based on the 1940 novel of the same name, features a deaf-mute loner (played by hearing actor Alan Arkin) who influences the lives of others in a Southern town.
Helen Keller in Her Story	1954	The American documentary film features the deafblind figure Helen Keller. The film won an Academy Award for Best Documentary in 1955.
Hell's Highway	1932	An American crime drama starring Richard Dix about a chain gang that makes a prison escape. One of the convicts was portrayed by deaf actor Joe Hermano.
His Bodyguard	1998	A female security guard is hired to protect a deaf man (played by deaf actor Anthony Natale) who seeks to retrieve a migraine cure stolen from his father's chemical engineering firm. She falls in love with him along the way.
Hoppers	2026	Animated sci-fi comedy features a sequence where the main character visits an elderly man about signing a petition to save the glade, only to realise that he hasn't been listening because his hearing aid has been turned off.
Hush	2016	The American horror film features a deaf woman living in a rural home (played by hearing actor Kate Siegel) who faces down a hearing killer after he breaks in.
I Don't Want to Talk About It	1993	The film, set in Argentina, features a hearing little person who, in her childhood, befriends a deaf girl.
In the Land of the Deaf	1992	The French documentary film explores Deaf communities in France that use French Sign Language.
Ingelore	2009	The American documentary film, produced by HBO, features the director's deaf mother, who was born to Jewish hearing parents in Germany in 1924 and escapes Nazi Germany.
Island Etude	2006	
It's All Gone Pete Tong	2004	The Canadian independent film is a mockumentary about an Ibiza-based disc jockey (played by hearing actor Paul Kaye) who goes deaf.
Illtown	1998	The American drama film features a drug-dealing hearing couple who take in the man's runaway deaf brother.
Immortal Beloved	1994	The biographical film features composer and pianist Ludwig van Beethoven, who loses his hearing over time. Beethoven is played by hearing actor Gary Oldman.
In Cold Light	2025	Canadian crime thriller features Deaf actor Troy Kotsur playing the protagonist's father.
In the Company of Men	1997	The black comedy film, featuring spoken English and American Sign Language, follows two hearing male white-collar workers (played by Aaron Eckhart and Matt Malloy) who target a deaf co-worker (played by hearing actor Stacy Edwards) to form romantic relationships with so that they can hurt her by breaking up with her afterward.
Iqbal	2005	
It's a Wonderful Life	1946	The American dramedy film follows hearing actor James Stewart's George Bailey, who is deaf in one ear. When he hugs the woman he loves, he cannot hear her reciprocation.
It's My Party	1996	
Jerry Maguire	1996	The American dramedy film features a hearing sports agent (played by Tom Cruise) and his hearing date (played by Renée Zellweger). They encounter a deaf couple in an elevator; one who signs "you complete me" to the other, and the agent later signs the same thing to his love.
John Tucker Must Die	2006	The American teen comedy film features a small scene occurs with two deaf teenage girls (played by deaf actresses and sisters Stephanie and Karlie A. Locke) engaging in a conversation at a school assembly while communicating in sign language.
Johnny Belinda	1948	The American drama film, based on a stageplay by Elmer Harris, follows the deaf Belinda, played by hearing actor Jane Wyman, who lives on a farm in Nova Scotia. She attends a village dance after a recently arrived hearing doctor teaches her sign language; whereafter she is cornered and raped by a local hearing man.
Johnny Belinda	1967	The American TV Movie, based on a stage play by Elmer Harris, stars the deaf woman Belinda, played by hearing actor Mia Farrow. Belinda lives on a farm in Nova Scotia and is unable to communicate with others until a recently arrived hearing doctor teaches her sign language. She is raped by a local hearing man after going to a village dance.
Khamoshi: The Musical	1996	An Indian musical drama film which is the story about Joseph (Nana Patekar) and Flavy Braganza (Seema Biswas), a deaf couple in Goa.
Knowing	2009	The science fiction thriller film stars Nicolas Cage as a hearing father who faces an apocalyptic world and rescues his hearing daughter and deaf son.
Koshish	1972	Considered a landmark movie in the history of Indian cinema, Koshish depicts a deaf couple (Sanjeev Kumar and Jaya Bhaduri) in a society desensitized to their struggles.
Kung Fu Hustle	2004	The Cantonese martial arts comedy film, produced by China and Hong Kong, features a deaf girl as the one social underdog who gets the protagonist to change sides.
Lake Windfall	2013	The American independent film features five friends, three deaf, who go on a camping trip that becomes a disaster.
Land of Silence and Darkness	1971	The German documentary film, directed by Werner Herzog, features deafblind people and how they live and perceive life.
Language Says It All	1987	The American short documentary film focuses on deaf children and their communication potential.
Lapse	2023	Brazilian short drama film written and directed by Caroline Cavalcanti, tells the story of Bel and Juliano, two teenagers living in the suburbs of Belo Horizonte in Brazil. Bel, who is turning 18, is deaf and faces the challenges of communication by sign language.
The Linguini Incident	1991	
Living in Two Worlds	2024	Japanese drama about a CODA who moves away from his deaf parents for an independent life in Tokyo.
A Lot like Love	2005	The American rom-com stars Ashton Kutcher as a hearing man developing a relationship with a hearing woman over seven years; deaf actor Ty Giordano plays his deaf brother.
Looking for Mr. Goodbar	1977	The American drama film features a hearing teacher of deaf children who goes clubbing in her free time.
Love Is Never Silent	1985	The American TV film, set from 1931 to 1945, stars hearing actress Mare Winningham and deaf actors Phyllis Frelich and Ed Waterstreet as a young hearing woman and her deaf parents, respectively, who converse in sign language. The woman grows up learning how to balance her own needs with her parents'.
Love N' Dancing	2009	American romance about a woman (Amy Smart) who falls for her dance teacher (played by hearing actor Tom Malloy, also the film's screenwriter), who is deaf after an infection and uses hearing aids.
Man of a Thousand Faces	1957	The American film dramatizes the life of silent film actor Lon Chaney, whose pantomime artistry was based, in part, on growing up with two deaf parents who communicated by signing. In a subplot, Chaney's wife has a negative attitude toward her deaf in-laws and fears their child also will be deaf.
The Man Who Played God	1932	
Mandy (also Crash of Silence)	1952	The British drama film features the titular deaf girl, Mandy (played by hearing actor Mandy Miller), being sent to a school for the deaf by her hearing mother, causing challenges in the family.
Marianna Ucrìa	1997	The Italian drama film features a deaf girl in 18th-century Sicily who is forced to marry an old Duke. As she gets older, a French tutor teaches her sign language, which she uses to gain independence and discover a dark truth from her childhood.
Marie's Story	2014	The French biographical film is based on the true story of Marie Heurtin, played by deaf actor Ariana Rivoire, a late 19th-century French deafblind girl taught how to read Braille and communicate in sign language by a nun.
Marnie	1964	The Alfred Hitchcock thriller contains a sequence where the title character commits a robbery in an office, attempting to evade a cleaning lady (played by hearing actor Edith Evanson), who is revealed as deaf when Marnie's shoe falls to the floor but the cleaning lady doesn't hear it.
Marty Supreme	2025	American sports drama features deaf table tennis champion Koto Kawaguchi as Japanese champion Koto Endo, who was deafened during the US bombing raids on Tokyo, and his ability to focus makes him a formidable opponent.
Mea Maxima Culpa: Silence in the House of God	2012	American documentary following allegations of clerical sexual abuse at St. John's School for the Deaf. Features four of the victims.
Medeas	2013	The south California drama features a hearing man, a deaf woman (played by hearing actress Catalina Sandino Moreno), and their five children, whose cattle farm suffers a drought.
Mermaids	1990	At the end of this comedy-drama, youngest daughter Kate (played by hearing actress Christina Ricci) has partial hearing loss after she nearly drowns when she falls into a river.
Millstone	2022	A desperate, grieving couple think they have found the only therapist who can give them what they want: to make them forget they had ever had a child.
Miracle on 34th Street	1994	The American Christmas film features a department store scene of a deaf signing girl (played by a deaf actress) sitting on Kris Kringle's lap. She is surprised when he responds in sign language himself.
The Miracle Worker	1962	The film features the deafblind Helen Keller (played by hearing actor Patty Duke) and her teacher Anne Sullivan.
The Miracle Worker	1979	The film features the deafblind Helen Keller and her teacher Anne Sullivan.
The Miracle Worker	2000	The film features the deafblind Helen Keller and her teacher Anne Sullivan.
Misjudged People	1932	The German documentary film features the German deaf community at the time of production. It was produced by the Reich Union of the Deaf of Germany to give the German public a positive perception of the capabilities of deaf people. It was banned by the Nazis in 1934 to avoid promoting that perception.
Mom and Dad Can't Hear Me	1978	The American TV film, part of the anthology series ABC Afterschool Special, features a 14-year-old girl who moves to a new town with her deaf parents. She is ashamed of their deafness and lies to her classmates so they do not know about or meet her parents.
Moonlight Sonata: Deafness in Three Movements	2019	The documentary, composed in three parts, explores three generations of deaf people.
Mr. Holland's Opus	1995	The American drama film features a hearing high school music teacher who aspires to compose music. He and his hearing wife have a deaf son, whom the teacher finds hard to accept due to the impossibility of his son hearing his intended composition. The teacher grows to accept his son as well as his own life.
Murder by Death	1976	The American murder mystery parody film features a dinner party with an ensemble cast, including an illiterate deaf-mute cook (played by hearing actress Nancy Walker).
Music Within	2007	
My Father Die	2017	
Nashville	1975	The American dramedy, about country people and gospel music businesses, features an ensemble cast that includes a hearing gospeler who is the mother of two deaf children.
The Night of the 12th	2022	A scene in this French crime drama features investigators hiring a deaf woman (who communicates in LSF) and her interpreter to try and lip-read a hidden camera video that has no sound.
No Ordinary Hero: The SuperDeafy Movie	2013	The American independent comedy-drama film features a Deaf actor who plays a superhero on a TV show. He meets a Deaf boy and works to inspire him.
No Road Back	1957	
No Way Out	1950	
Nutty Professor II: The Klumps	2000	In this American comedy sequel, Granny Klump (Eddie Murphy) has a relationship with an elderly man who uses hearing aids, which she deactivates when she has a conversation she doesn't want him to hear.
Once in a Lifetime	1994	Made for television romantic drama about a widowed hearing novelist (played by Lindsay Wagner), who gives birth to a deaf son (played by deaf actor Darrell Thomas Utley). She enrols her son in a school for the deaf, where she falls for his hearing teacher (played by Barry Bostwick).
Orphan	2009	A psychological horror movie that features a couple intent on adopting the titular orphan; the couple has two other children, a hearing son and a deaf daughter.
Out of the Past	1947	Classic Noir film starring Robert Mitchum. A man in hiding from the mob befriends a deaf kid, played by hearing actor Dickie Moore, who helps him in a key scene.
Out of This World	2020	French thriller about a serial killer taxi driver who becomes obsessed with a deaf dancer (played by hearing actor Aurélia Poirier).
The Parts You Lose	2019	The thriller film features a fugitive who hides on a family farm in the U.S. state of North Dakota; he befriends a deaf boy played by deaf actor Danny Murphy.
Past Future	2022	Partly-signed musical starring deaf actor Hillary Baack and her husband Alexander Baack (who directs), as their family deals with COVID-19 pandemic in 2020.
The Penguin Pool Murder	1932	Edna May Oliver portrays Hildegarde Withers, who takes her elementary school class to the New York Aquarium where a murder occurs. One of the chief suspects is Chicago Lew, portrayed by deaf actor Joe Hermano.
The Perfect Circle	1997	The Bosnian war drama features a hearing poet who helps two boys, one hearing and one deaf, during the Siege of Sarajevo.
Perfect Sense	2011	Ewan McGregor and Eva Green play two people who fall in love during a global epidemic that causes people to lose their senses one by one; late in the film, the entire world becomes deaf.
Preman	2021	Indonesian action film about a deaf gangster (played by hearing actor Khiva Iskak) who turns on his organisation to protect his son.
Primate	2025	American horror film about a family's adopted chimpanzee turning violent features deaf actor Troy Kotsur as the father, whose deafness makes him initially unaware of the dangerous animal sneaking up on him; the film simulates the character's deafness to build suspense.
Protein	2024	Welsh horror crime film about a cannibalistic vigilante who targets a gang, one of whom, Gary (played by hearing actor Gareth John Bale), wears hearing aids.
Psych-Out	1968	In the American counterculture film, 17-year-old deaf runaway Jenny (played by hearing actor Susan Strasberg) travels to San Francisco to find her brother; pursued by authorities, and befriending members of a psychedelic band, she gets involved in the city's hippie scene before finding him.
The Quiet	2005	The American thriller film features a teenage girl (played by hearing actor Camilla Belle), who has been deaf and silent since the age of seven; she is orphaned and moves in with her hearing godparents. She is bullied by their hearing daughter, though the two eventually find common ground.
A Quiet Place	2018	The horror film features a deaf girl (played by deaf actor Millicent Simmonds) and her hearing family, who have to stay quiet on a remote farm to avoid attracting dark forces.
A Quiet Place Part II	2021	The horror sequel to A Quiet Place (2018) sees the young deaf actress above reprise her role in the post-apocalyptic world of creatures who hunt by sound.
Rally Caps	2024	American family drama about a young baseball player who befriends another player (played by Colten Pride), who was born deaf and wears a hearing aid and a cochlear implant.
Rangasthalam	2018	In the Indian Telugu-language period action-drama film, the Protagonist (played by hearing actor Ram Charan) is partially deaf and does not want to use a hearing aid.
Read My Lips	2001	The French thriller film features a female hard-of-hearing office worker who wants to help a hearing ex-convict.
Requiem for a Dream	2000	In the American psychological drama film, one of the hearing protagonists encounters a speaking-signing deaf drug dealer.
Resident Evil: Retribution	2012	The fifth part of the Resident Evil Saga features a girl named Becky (played by Deaf actress Aryana Engineer), a clone of Alice who playing the role of suburban-Alice-clone's deaf daughter. She is later rescued by our primary Alice clone.
Ridicule	1996	The French drama film, set in the late 18th century, features hearing aristocrats who attempt to humiliate each other. In one scene, a group of deaf people are mocked by the aristocrats, but the group winds up having the last laugh.
The River Wild	1994	The American thriller film features a family on a rafting trip who have to face a pair of armed killers. The mother of the family, Gail, is a teacher of deaf students, so she knows sign language and uses it to communicate surreptitiously.
Satan's Slaves	2017	An Indonesian horror film which features a deaf child who communicates through Indonesian Sign Language.
Satan's Slaves 2: Communion	2022	Indonesian horror sequel which also features a deaf child.
Saving Silverman	2001	The American comedy film about two best friends (Jack Black and Steve Zahn) trying to stop their friend (Jason Biggs) from marrying his controlling new girlfriend (Amanda Peet). Deaf Canadian actor Max Fomitchev also appears in the film in a small role as a mime.
See No Evil, Hear No Evil	1989	The American comedy film features a blind man (Richard Pryor) and a deaf man (played by hearing actor Gene Wilder) to stop three murderous thieves.
See What I Say	1981	The American short documentary film features deaf women who discuss their use of sign language.
See What I'm Saying: The Deaf Entertainers Documentary	2009	The American documentary film explores the careers of four deaf entertainers: standup comic CJ Jones, HIV-positive actor Robert DeMayo, drummer Bob Hiltermann of the all-deaf band Beethoven's Nightmare, and singer/actress TL Forsberg.
Sesame Street Presents: Follow That Bird	1985	The film features the deaf character Linda (played by deaf actress Linda Bove), who reprises her role from the children's series Sesame Street.
The Shape of Water	2017	A deaf and mute woman (played by hearing actress Sally Hawkins) communicates with her hearing neighbor (Richard Jenkins) frequently throughout the film, and teaches a humanoid fish creature basic phrases in American sign language.
The Shop on Main Street	1965	The Czechoslovak drama film set in the Slovak State during World War II features a shop owned by a mostly deaf elderly Jewish woman. Her friends pay a carpenter to be her co-worker so she is not deported to a concentration camp.
Sicario: Day of the Soldado	2018	The crime film features one of the main (hearing) characters interacting with a deaf man in Mexican Sign Language; the film reveals that the main character had a deaf daughter, which is how he knew LSM.
Sierra Burgess Is a Loser	2018	The American comedy film features the hearing teenage girl pretending to be deaf when meeting a hearing love interest in person, but the love interest recognizes her sign language because his brother is deaf (and played by deaf actor Cochise Zornoza).
Sign Gene: The First Deaf Superheroes	2017	The Italian and American superhero film features Deaf superheroes who can actualize superpowers with signs. The story centers on a Deaf agent from New York City (played by deaf actor Emilio Insolera). A carrier of a powerful genetic mutation, he is sent to Japan with his colleague to investigate some intriguing crimes committed by Japanese Deaf mutants.
Silenced	2011	Dramatisation of the Gwangju Inhwa School scandal, in which children were physically and sexually abused at a South Korean school for the deaf.
The Silence	2019	The American horror film, based on a book by Tim Lebbon, features a deaf girl (played by hearing actor Kiernan Shipka) in a world of monsters.
The Silent Child	2017	A four year old profoundly deaf girl is silent until she is taught sign language by a social worker. Won the Live Action Short Film category at the 90th Academy Awards.
The Silent Hour	2024	American action-thriller about a police officer (played by hearing actor Joel Kinnaman) who becomes hearing impaired in an accident, and has to protect a deaf witness (played by deaf actor Sandra Mae Frank) from those that wish to eliminate her.
The Silent War	2019	The Spanish film, set during World War II, features Asier Etxeandia as a soldier in Spain who becomes deaf and has to survive a manhunt.
Silent Victory: The Kitty O'Neil Story	1979	Documentary of the eponymous deaf stuntwoman.
Sincerely Yours	1955	
Small, Slow But Steady	2022	Japanese drama about a deaf woman (played by hearing actor Yukino Kishii) with dreams of becoming a professional boxer.
Solarbabies	1986	American science fiction film set in a post-apocalyptic future about a group of roller skating orphans, one of whom, Daniel (played by hearing actor Lukas Haas), is deaf, and has his hearing restored after an encounter with an alien orb.
Sound and Fury	2000	An American documentary film about two brothers, one Deaf and one hearing, and their families. The Deaf brother has a deaf wife and daughter; while he despises cochlear implants, his daughter wants one. The hearing brother has a hearing wife and a deaf baby. The film explores the impact of cochlear implants with regard to Deaf Culture.
Sound of Metal	2019	An American drama film starring hearing actor Riz Ahmed as a metal drummer who loses his hearing.
Soundtrack	2011	Bollywood remake of It's All Gone Pete Tong, using the same premise of a DJ who goes deaf.
Speakeasy	2002	
Speed 2: Cruise Control	1997	Action sequel involves a cruise ship that is hijacked; one of the passengers is a young deaf girl (played by deaf actor Christine Firkins).
Spy Kids 4: All the Time in the World	2011	Cecil is hearing impaired and uses hearing aids.
A Star Is Born	2018	The American romantic drama film about two musicians in love features one of them having noise-induced hearing loss and tinnitus.
Stille Liebe	2001	The Swiss film features a signing deaf nun who travels from her German convent to the city to work at a center for the homeless. She meets a signing deaf man and falls in love with him. The man, who turns out to be a pickpocket, is killed by the police. The nun resolves to move to the United States to become an actor.
The Story of Alexander Graham Bell	1939	
The Story of Esther Costello	1957	
Suspect	1987	The American courtroom drama film stars Cher as a hearing public defender assigned to a deaf bum (played by hearing actor Liam Neeson) who is arrested for the murder of a Washington legal secretary.
Sweet Nothing in My Ear	2008	The American television film, part of the anthology program Hallmark Hall of Fame, features a couple, a hearing man and a deaf woman (played by deaf actor Marlee Matlin), who have an eight-year-old son who is gradually losing his hearing. While the mother assumes the family will use sign language, a doctor who sees the son recommends for the father to look into cochlear implants. The parents begin fighting with each other about raising their son, and it leads to a court battle for custody.
Sympathy for Mr. Vengeance	2002	The South Korean thriller film features a deaf man (played by the hearing actor, Shin Ha-kyun) working in a factory who then becomes involved with illegal organ transplantation, kidnapping, and murder.
Talentime	2009	The Malaysian romantic drama film features a deaf student named Mahesh who falls in love with a girl named Melur, whom he was assigned to pick up for rehearsals as a finalist of a school talent show, but comes in conflict with family traditions.
Take Shelter	2011	The American psychological drama film features a Midwestern family man who has apocalyptic visions and starts building a storm shelter for his family. His daughter is deaf, and he and his wife desperately try to get a cochlear implant for her.
The 355	2022	The spy film features an ensemble cast that includes deaf actor Emilio Insolera as a hacker.
The Babysitters Club	1995	The American comedy drama film based on Ann M. Martin's novel of the same name. The film features a little boy named Matt who is deaf (played by deaf child actor Lance O'Reilly) and the girls are learning sign language in order to communicate with him.
The Little Death	2014	The Australian sex comedy deals with the secret lives of five suburban couples living in Sydney, revealing both the fetishes and the repercussions that come with sharing them. One of them is VRS agent who relays the call between the deaf caller who signs in Auslan and the hearing phone sex worker.
Thelma	2024	In this American action-comedy, both the title character (played by June Squibb) and Ben (played by Richard Roundtree) use hearing aids, which they connect to their phones to talk to each other privately and to guide Thelma through an antiques shop.
There Will Be Blood	2007	The American historical drama film stars Daniel Day-Lewis as a hearing oilman whose son goes deaf due to a gas blowout. The oilman sends his son to a school for the deaf. Later in the film, he sees his adult son (played by deaf actor Russell Harvard) who now knows sign language and marries a woman who also knows sign language.
Think Me Nothing	1975	ref.
This Is Normal	2013	The American short film stars hearing actress Ryann Turner as a deaf woman who undergoes surgery to become completely hearing. It also features multiple deaf side characters who disapprove of her choice.
Tin Man	1983	The American drama film stars hearing actor Timothy Bottoms as a deaf auto mechanic who invents a computer allowing him to hear and speak. He tries to get his invention produced, but is undermined by a salesman.
To Live (also Lifelines)	1994	The Chinese drama film features a Chinese couple who have a son and daughter. The daughter loses her hearing as a result of an illness.
Touch the Sound	2004	The German documentary film is about profoundly deaf Scottish classical percussionist Evelyn Glennie.
The Tribe	2014	The Ukrainian drama film features teenage gangsters at a school for the deaf. Ukrainian Sign Language is shown between the characters, but with no voiceover or subtitles.
Through Deaf Eyes	2007	The American documentary, produced by PBS, explores the lives of Deaf people in the United States in the past 200 years.
Tommy	1975	British satirical operetta fantasy drama film written and directed by Ken Russell and based upon The Who's 1969 rock opera album Tommy about a "psychosomatically deaf, mute, and blind" boy who becomes a pinball champion and religious leader.
Toy Story 5	2026	Animated sequel briefly features an elderly couple who wear hearing aids, who find Jessie and Bullseye on the street, and take her to the address written on her leg, which returns her back to the home of her original owner.
Tuner	2025	American-Canadian crime thriller about a piano tuner with hyperacusis (Leo Woodall) features hearing actor Dustin Hoffman as his mentor, who has hearing loss, but often misplaces his hearing aids. At the end of the film, the main character is partially deafened when an air horn is used to rupture his eardrums.
Universal Signs	2008	The American drama film features a deaf artist who blames himself for the death of his fiancée's daughter and struggles to recover.
Unsound	2020	Australian drama about a romance between a musician and a deaf trans man (played by deaf performer Yiana Pandelis).
Up	2009	Carl wears hearing aids and uses them to ignore Russell.
Venom: Let There Be Carnage	2021	In this superhero sequel, Patrick Mulligan (played by hearing actor Stephen Graham) wears a hearing aid after an encounter as a young officer with the sonic screams of Shriek.
Voices	1979	
Walker	1987	
The Way We Talk	2024	Hong Kong drama about a cochlear implant user (played by hearing actor Chung Suet Ying) as she navigates whether to integrate with hearing people or embrace the deaf community after befriending a sign language enthusiast (played by hearing actor Neo Yau). Deaf actor Marco Ng plays a friend of the protagonists, and much of the film is in Hong Kong Sign Language.
We Met in Virtual Reality	2022	Documentary filmed in a virtual reality world during the COVID-19 pandemic. Some parts of the film explore virtual Deaf spaces and the use of sign languages in VRChat, including in interviews.
Wedding of Silence	2004	The Russian documentary film features a monochromatic wedding in the Deaf community of Saint Petersburg.
What the Bleep Do We Know!?	2004	This American movie about quantum mysticism blends narrative, documentary, and animation cinematographies. The film features Marlee Matlin as the deaf photographer who explores the spiritual connection between quantum physics and consciousness.
Where the Truth Lies (a.k.a. Ninety Days at Hollyridge)	1999	
Wild Flower	1991	In a small town in 1938, adolescent Sammy Perkins (William McNamara) and his sibling Ellie (Reese Witherspoon) find Alice (Patricia Arquette) alone in a shack, where her heartless stepdad forces her to live because he is disgusted by her disabilities. Sammy and Ellie quickly grow close to Alice, who struggles with both epilepsy and a hearing problem. Together, the brother and sister help their friend live a more fulfilling life, but the process is interrupted by Alice's stepfather.
Wild Prairie Rose	2016	American drama film directed by Deborah LaVine. In 1952, Rose Miller returns to her rural hometown of Beresford, South Dakota to care for her ailing mother. Once there, she falls in love with a deaf man (played by deaf actor Troy Kotsur) and must decide if she has the courage to follow her heart.
Wonderstruck	2017	The American drama film, directed by Todd Haynes and based on the juvenile fiction novel of the same name, features two children in separate time periods (1927 and 1977) whose storylines interweave. One child is deaf and played by deaf actor Millicent Simmonds, and the other is partly deaf and played by hearing actor Oakes Fegley.
World of Delight	2015	Japanese youth romance film directed by Yoshishige Miyake and based on the novel Raintree no Kuni by Hiro Arikawa about a blog writer Hitomi Rika that refuses to meet Sakisaka Nobuyuki, a salaryman she's been exchanging emails with, because of her secret of being hard of hearing.

=== Films by deaf directors ===
The following films were directed by deaf directors: Deafula (1975), Lake Windfall (2013), No Ordinary Hero: The SuperDeafy Movie (2013), See What I'm Saying: The Deaf Entertainers Documentary (2009) and Sign Gene: The First Deaf Superheroes (2017).

=== Films about deaf pretenders ===
These films feature characters who pretend to be deaf or hard of hearing:

- One Flew Over the Cuckoo's Nest (1975), an American comedy-drama film based on the 1962 novel of the same name which is set in a mental institution and features a Native American side character who is believed to be a deafmute, until revealed otherwise.
- What the Deaf Man Heard (1997), an American television film set in the U.S. state of Georgia in 1945 in which the hearing protagonist lives in a town for 20 years pretending to be deaf.

== See also ==
- Deaf Movie Database

== Bibliography ==
- Lane, Harlan L.; Hoffmeister, Robert J.; Bahan, Benjamin J. (1996). A Journey into the Deaf-World. DawnSignPress. p. 152. ISBN 978-0-915035-63-2.
- Schuchman, John S. (1999). Hollywood Speaks: Deafness and the Film Entertainment Industry. University of Illinois Press. ISBN 978-0-252-06850-8.
