= Hilari Scarl =

American filmmaker

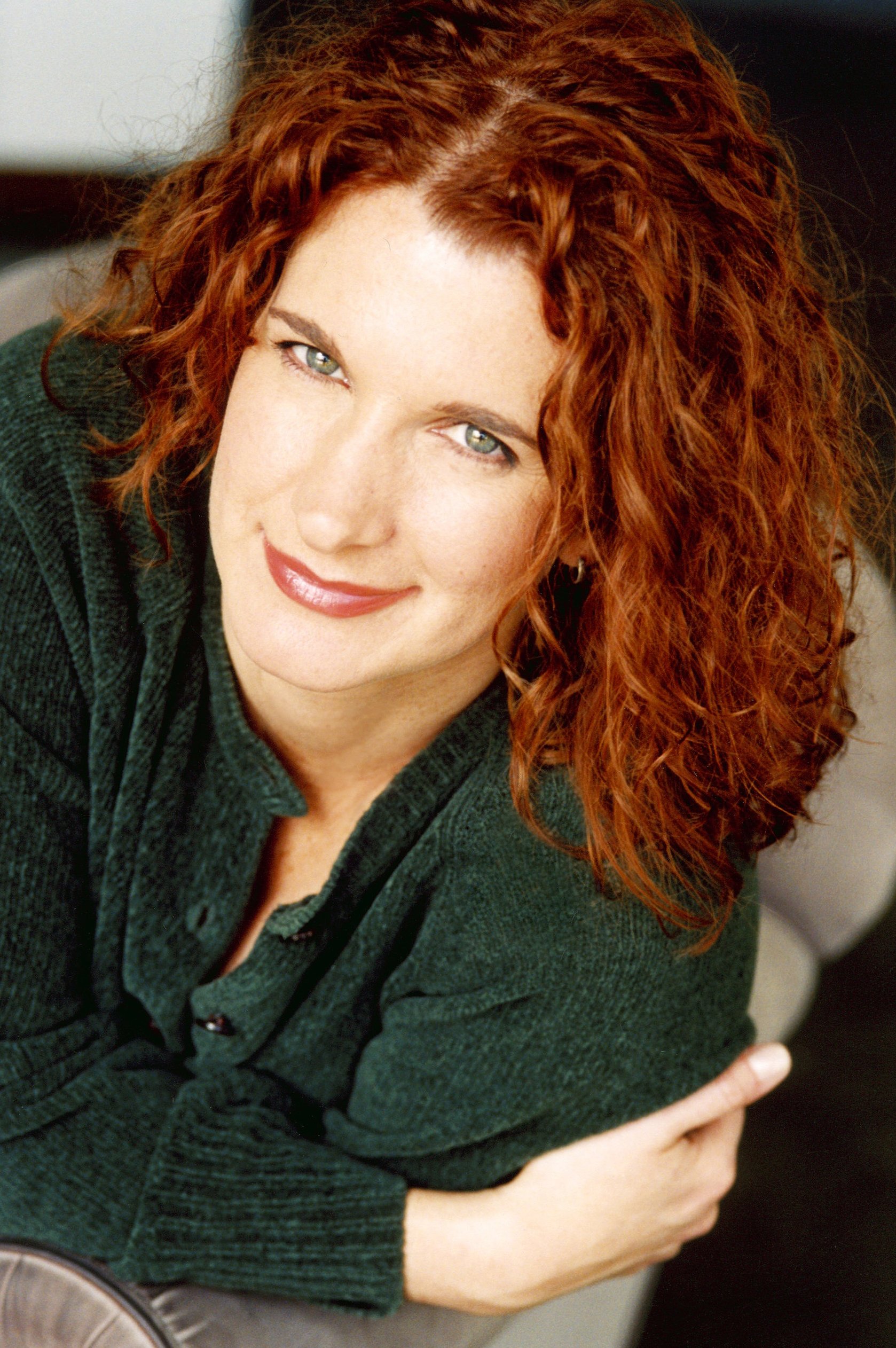
- Occupation: Filmmaker

Hilari Scarl is an American filmmaker who directed and produced the documentary See What I'm Saying: The Deaf Entertainers Documentary (2009), starring Bob Hiltermann, TL Forsberg, CJ Jones and Robert DeMayo. She also produced No Ordinary Hero: The SuperDeafy Movie (2013).

Scarl was one of the 50 filmmakers chosen by Steven Spielberg out of 12,000 directors for his reality television show On the Lot on FOX. She made it to the final 19.

Scarl is a board member of the Alliance of Women Directors.

== Filmography ==
List of film from Stage32

| Year | Film | Director | Writer | Producer | Notes |
|---|---|---|---|---|---|
| 2000 | Making the Band | No | No | No | Editorial department. Television (Music and Reality-TV) |
| 2001 | Fortune Inn | No | No | Yes | Film (Short and Fantasy) |
| 2002 | The Tomorrow Man | No | No | No | Actress. Video (Drama, Sci-Fi and Thriller) |
| 2004 | In the Middle of a Movie | No | Yes | No | |
| 2006 | Iraq for Sale: The War Profiteers | No | No | No | Miscellaneous Crew |
| 2006 | Worldplay | No | No | Yes | |
| 2006 | Most Shocking | No | No | Yes | |
| 2006 | Paving the Way | No | No | Yes | |
| 2007 | Mega Movers | No | No | No | Miscellaneous Crew |
| 2007 | Ditto | No | No | Yes | DITTO was completed as the final submission film that enabled Hilari Scarl to be selected as a semi-finalist to compete on the Steven Spielberg television show ON THE LOT. |
| 2007 | Snips & Snails | No | No | Yes | |
| 2009 | See What I'm Saying: The Deaf Entertainers Documentary | No | No | Yes | |
| 2013 | No Ordinary Hero: The SuperDeafy Movie | No | No | Yes | |
| 2016 | Chill | Yes | No | No | |
