= Disability in horror films =

Cultural phenomenon

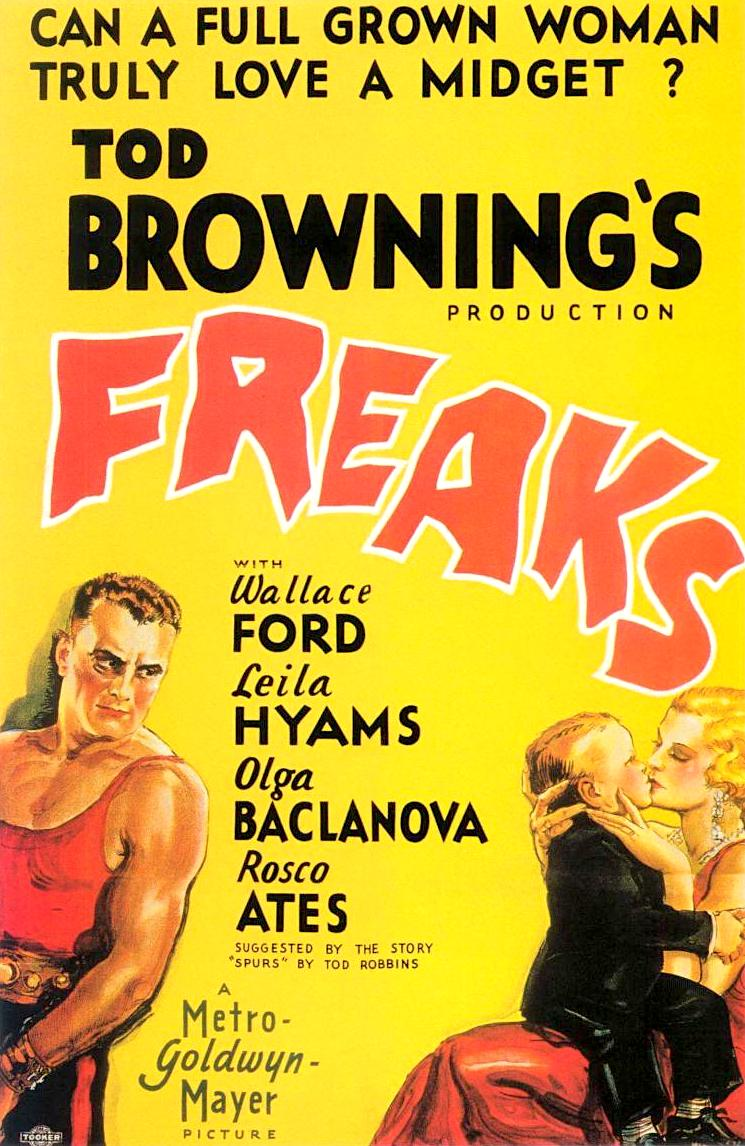
Promotional poster for Freaks (1932). Whilst the film has been praised for its majority disabled cast, it has also been described as exploitative.

Horror films have frequently featured disability, dating to the genre's earliest origins in the 1930s. Various disabilities have been used in the genre to create or augment horror in audiences, which has attracted commentary from some critics and disability activists.

(The opening provides historical context but does not clearly establish the article's overall scope.)

Monsters and villains depicted in many horror films have often had physical or mental disabilities. These evolved from being sympathetic depictions of disabled characters in early monster films such as Frankenstein, to presentations of disabled people as "bloodthirsty and terrifying" in slasher films of the 1970s and 1980s. Horror films have sometimes attracted criticism for their depictions of disability or have been described as ableist. Some films have been accused of reflecting eugenicist views held by the society of their time. Tropes of characters "overcoming" disability, or of disability granting special powers, have been described as damaging.

== Physical disabilities ==
Historically, there has been a trend of using physical disability in horror to signify a character's monstrosity; as though their physical difference represented moral difference. Despite this trope's popularity within the horror genre, this is not at all accurate to real life which has led to some recent releases in the genre that have begun to challenge this view.

=== Disabled enemy ===
Tod Browning's Freaks (1932) has been highlighted as a notable example of a horror film for prominently depicting disability, and has received diverse commentary for its depiction of the community, with some labelling it as portraying disability sympathetic and anti-eugenicist and others criticising it for being exploitative. As of 2020, it remains one of few American films to feature a predominantly disabled cast. Independent film Deafula (1975) is notable for being entirely in sign language. Jason Voorhees from the Friday the 13th series and Leatherface from The Texas Chain Saw Massacre are both violent killers with disabilities that have been described as depicting disability as fearful or taboo. In the 21st century, some commentators noted a trend of horror films depicting deafness in a perceivedly fetishistic manner, including A Quiet Place and The Unholy. Lupita Nyong'o's performance in the 2019 film Us was criticized by disability rights groups for being inspired by symptoms of spasmodic dysphonia. In the film Gerald's Game (2017), the antagonist character Raymond Andrew Joubert has acromegaly, a disorder that causes abnormal growth in the hands, feet, and face, and critics point out that this disorder is used to villainize people who have a different appearance.

=== Disabled Protagonists ===
A more recent horror film contains a powerful portrayal of disability rather than using the disabled character as a villain; Run (2020). The film centers around a wheelchair bound character played by Kiera Allen, a wheelchair user herself, signifying the first instance in over 70 years for an authentic wheelchair user to star in a thriller. Critics point to this as a powerful example of disability representation because it portrays the strength and resilience of disabled people while also confronting the reality of abuse perpetrated against disabled children by their family members which is a perspective not often seen in media. In Hush (2016), Kate Siegel plays a Deaf-mute character who fights against a home invader who targets her due to her deafness, seeing her as "easy prey". The film received some backlash due to the fact that the Kate Siegel is a hearing actress playing a Deaf character and is thus not able to accurately embody the experience. Despite this criticism, the movie has gained recognition and praise for portraying a Deaf character who was not "othered" by the narrative. It has also received praise for undermining the Final Girl narrative.

== Mental disabilities ==
According to the World Health Organization, "nearly 1 in 7 people in the world live with a mental disorder" and this includes a broad range from anxiety and depression to schizophrenia and dissocial disorders. Despite how common these disabilities are, they are still portrayed as different and dangerous in horror movies when this is often not the case. Below are some examples of movies that have shaped public opinion of disabilities such as dissociative identity disorder and schizophrenia and movies that are working to reshape public perceptions of mental disabilities.

=== Disabled Antagonists ===
The film Split has been criticised for its portrayal of dissociative identity disorder. In particular, the film is criticized for reinforcing negative stereotypes about the disorder and potentially harming individuals who live with it.

. In an open letter to M. Night Shyamalan, disability activists wrote that "Split represents yet another gross parody of us based on fear, ignorance, and sensationalism, only much worse." Psycho (1960) and Donnie Darko (2001) have received much criticism for their portrayals of people with schizophrenia as dangerous or supernatural which in turn demonizes or minimizes people with the disorder.

=== Disabled Protagonists ===
In the year two thousand and five, the independent psychological horror film They Look Like People received widely positive reactions, including on how director Perry Blackshear treated the issue of psychosis. Gabe Castro of Ghouls Next Door praised the movie for showing how the character portrayed by MacLeod Andrews does not hurt anyone despite his persecutory hallucinations.

The 2016 American horror film Spring Break Zombie Massacre was created by Sam Suchman and Mattie Zufelt, best friends with Down syndrome, who also starred in the film. The movie was widely praised as refreshing for having neurodivergent minds in charge of the creative process. It was also celebrated for featuring protagonists with Down syndrome whose disability was not the main focus of the film.

== Stigmatization from stereotypes ==
About 27% of adults living in the United States live with a disability. That just the representation in movies are all more important. when horror movies like stated before are represented as monstrous; it can cause more stereotypes and stigmatization to jump into the real world. It is very telling with people with visible disabilities. There was a study made in the controlled group there was a lot of stereotypical behavior towards the people who have visible disabilities. Then the people with no disabilities had no out of the ordinary action taken out of them. They have 3 main hypothesis from this study. The first hypothesis is that when two groups there would be a mix of both increase and decrease stigma. when two groups one with disabilities the other with none there will be some more understanding of each other. They also predicted that could increase stigma because the stereotypes may reinforce themselves. The second hypothesis is that people would just have less negative thoughts with people disabilities. Finally the last hypothesis is the two groups wont have anything in common and nothing may change. The outcome of the interactions of these groups showed that people went into their own groups based on things like race and similar disabilities. Then that grew stigmatization within these groups. This is why representation in movies are so important. When there is representation of disabled people in horror movies as grotesque villians people will grow not the right throughts about disbilites in real life.

== What is another way to portray disabilities ==
An article written by Katherine Fusco goes into depth of how horror movies should show disabilities with more of a sense of empathy. Carl Plantinga who is a film professor at Calvin College, built this idea of empathy. She started this work on film where the root of horror movies should show more empathy and emotion to be able to get a more impactful and lasting movie.

== See also ==
- Disability in the arts
- Disability in the media
- List of films featuring the deaf and hard of hearing
