= See What I Say =

1981 film

- Produced by: Linda Chapman; Pam LeBlanc; Freddi Stevens
- Production company: Michigan Women Filmmakers
- Distributed by: Filmakers Library
- Release date: 1981
- Country: United States
- Language: English

See What I Say is a 1981 American short documentary film produced by Linda Chapman, Pam LeBlanc and Freddi Stevens. It was nominated for an Academy Award for Best Documentary Short. The subjects of the film are hearing-impaired women who discuss their use of sign language. Also included are the singer-songwriter Holly Near and her concert sign language interpreter.

== Reception ==
A reviewer for Choice wrote: "The beauty in both the technical aspects and the content is that there is a feeling of cooperation, community, and sharing among all those who participated in the making of the film."

== See also ==
- List of films featuring the deaf and hard of hearing
