= Ashlyn Sanchez =

American actress

- Occupation: Child actress
- Years active: 2003–2008

Ashlyn Sanchez is a former American child actress. Notable roles include Crash and The Happening.

== Filmography ==
=== Film ===
Year	Title	Role	Notes
2004	Crash	Lara	
2006	Marrying God	Lola	Short
2006	Kill Your Darlings	Meadow	
2008	Universal Signs	Katie	
2008	The Happening	Jess	

=== Television ===
Year	Title	Role	Notes
2003	Charmed	Little Bianca	1 episode
2005	Alias	Young Renée	1 episode
2005	CSI: Crime Scene Investigation	April Torres	1 episode
2006	The West Wing	Miranda Santos	3 episodes
2006	Vanished	Inez Kelton	4 episodes
2007	Without a Trace	Sofie Delgado	2 episodes
2007	Raines	Grace Tobman	1 episode

== Critical reception ==
Sanchez earned specific praise for her role in Crash: "Michael Pena and Ashlyn Sanchez flat out steal the movie with their sweet-yet-not-saccharine, wholly realistic father-daughter relationship. They share an incredibly touching scene that not only adds gravitas to their storyline, but also to the entire movie"; and criticism for her role in The Happening.
