= Misjudged People =

1932 film

Verkannte Menschen Misjudged People
- Directed by: Wilhelm Ballier
- Written by: Wilhelm Ballier
- Produced by: Alfred Kell
- Release date: 1932
- Running time: 60 minutes (est.)
- Country: Germany
- Language: German

Misjudged People (German: Verkannte Menschen) is a 1932 German documentary film that features the German deaf community. It was produced by the Reich Union of the Deaf (Reichsverband der Gehörlosen Deutschlands) of Germany to give the German public a positive perception of the capabilities of deaf people. It was banned by the Nazis in 1934 to avoid promoting a more positive perception of deaf people.

== Synopsis ==
The documentary has two parts, with the first part focused on education and the second on deaf people as actively contributing German citizens.

== Production ==
The organization Reich Union of the Deaf of Germany (Reichsverband der Gehörlosen Deutschlands, ReGeDe) was formed in 1927 from multiple regional associations. ReGeDe wanted to create a more positive perception of deaf people by the rest of the German public, so they produced a documentary based on a script written by Wilhelm Ballier, who was deaf and a Nazi sympathizer.

== Release ==
The film was released in 1932, but the Nazis did not want the positive perception promoted, so Joseph Goebbels, the minister of propaganda, banned it in 1934.

== Reception ==
Carol Poore, writing in Disability in Twentieth-Century German Culture, said that Misjudged People "is an important document about the German deaf community" in the Weimar Republic's last years.

The Encyclopedia of Disability said that Misjudged People was an example of Deaf Europeans trying "to counter popular impressions of deaf people as inferior" by instead representing themselves "to hearing society as healthy, vigorous, and thoroughly modern individuals".

== See also ==
- List of films featuring the deaf and hard of hearing
