= The Hammer (2010 film) =

- Film poster
- Directed by: Oren Kaplan
- Screenplay by: Eben Kostbar; Joseph McKelheer
- Produced by: Kip Konwiser (executive producer), Eben Kostbar; Joseph McKelheer
- Starring: Russell Harvard
- Cinematography: David Rom
- Edited by: Jacquelyn Dean
- Music by: iZLER
- Production companies: Film Harvest; Fifth Year Productions; Tapout Films
- Distributed by: D&E Entertainment
- Release dates: November 7, 2010 (AFI); October 27, 2011 (United States)
- Running time: 108 minutes
- Country: United States
- Languages: English; American Sign Language

The Hammer, previously titled Hamill, is a 2010 biographical film about Matt Hamill, a deaf wrestler and mixed martial artist. Oren Kaplan directs the film based on a screenplay co-written by Eben Kostbar and Joseph McKelheer, who are also the film's producers. Russell Harvard, a deaf actor, plays Hamill in the film. The Hammer screened at several film festivals throughout 2010 and 2011. The film was released in theaters on October 27, 2011.

== Plot ==
The Hammer follows Matt Hamill, who was born deaf, in his youth and mostly in 1997, when Hamill is a sophomore walk-on at Rochester Institute of Technology and wins the first of three collegiate wrestling championships.

== Cast ==
- Russell Harvard as Matt Hamill
  - Theodore Conley as young Matt
- Raymond J. Barry as Stanley, Hamill's grandfather
- Shoshannah Stern as Kristi, Hamill's girlfriend
- Susan Gibney as Janet Hamill
- Lexi Marman as Kelley, Kristi's roommate
- Michael Anthony Spady as Jay, Hamill's roommate
- Bob Hiltermann as Purdue Professor
- Benjamin Kally as BenC'moe

Also in the film are Robin Walton, Gavin Bellour, Stephen Dodd, and Courtney Halverson. One of Hamill's former opponents, Rich Franklin, also appears in the film as Purdue University wrestling coach Pruitt who cuts Hamill from the team.

== Production ==
The Hammer is directed by Oren Kaplan based on a screenplay co-written by Eben Kostbar and Joseph McKelheer, who are also the film's producers. Matt Hamill is played by Russell Harvard, who is also deaf. The filmmakers spent over five years developing the project, and they sought out deaf cast and crew members for the film. According to McKelheer, the writers performed "roughly" 75 rewrites to ensure Hamill's support and that the film would not be cheesy. Kostbar was originally intended to play Hamill, but they decided to cast a deaf person as the wrestler to appeal to the deaf community. They first noticed Harvard in his brief role in There Will Be Blood as the adult son of Daniel Day-Lewis's character but were not sure initially if Harvard could portray an athlete. After additional searching that was inconclusive, they chose to cast Harvard as Hamill.

Kostbar and McKelheer produced the film with their independent film company Film Harvest. For the production, they sought financing and found it with Fifth Year Productions, which was founded by the Farrelly brothers, Jim Kelly, and Bob Bartosiewicz. Most of the film was shot in Rochester, New York, home of Hamill's college, Rochester Institute of Technology. Scenes at Purdue were actually shot at the University of Rochester. The film alternates between use of sound and absence of sound as well as the use of subtitles, frequently with words missing.

== Release ==
The Hammer, titled Hamill at the time, had its world premiere at the AFI (American Film Institute) Film Festival in November 2010, where it won a Breakthrough Film Audience Award and a $5,500 prize. From then to May 2011, the film was screened at film festivals in Newport Beach, Florida, Miami, Cleveland, and Philadelphia, winning audience awards at each festival. The film was given a limited theatrical release as The Hammer on October 27, 2011. It was distributed by D&E Entertainment. The film was also released on DVD, Blu-ray, and video on demand by ARC Entertainment.

== See also ==
- List of films featuring the deaf and hard of hearing
