= Ryan Lane =

American actor (born 1987)

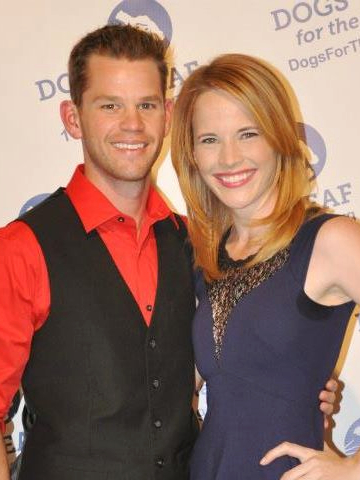
- Ryan Lane and Katie Leclerc at a Dogs for the Deaf benefit in April 2013
- Born: Ryan Thomas Lane; November 23, 1987 (age 38); Fullerton, California, U.S.
- Occupation: Actor
- Years active: 2007–present
- Website: RyanLaneOnline.com

Ryan Thomas Lane (born November 23, 1987) is an American actor. Beginning his professional career at the age of nineteen, Lane is best known for his portrayal of Cincinnati Reds center-fielder William Ellsworth Hoy in the Documentary Channel biography Dummy Hoy: A Deaf Hero, and for his recurring role as Travis Barnes on the ABC Family drama series Switched at Birth, which earned him the RJ Mitte Diversity Award at the 2013 Media Access Awards.

== Early life ==
Lane was born on November 23, 1987, in Fullerton, California to parents William, who is hard of hearing, and Jill Lane. Lane was born deaf and diagnosed at two weeks old with congenital nerve deafness. He has two older sisters, Kristyn (b. 1983) and Hayley (b. 1986) who are both hearing. His parents divorced when he was eight and he then split his time between living with his father in Ontario, California and his mother in Diamond Bar, California. He attended school in the County School District of Los Angeles and graduated from the California School for the Deaf, Riverside (CSDR) in 2007.

== Career ==
In 2007, director David Risotto discovered a photograph of Lane in his football uniform on the wall at CSDR (some conflicting sources reporting it as a photograph in the CSDR yearbook). Risotto had been searching for a young man who was deaf and could play baseball to portray Cincinnati Reds Hall of Fame center-fielder William Ellsworth "Dummy" Hoy in the documentary Dummy Hoy: A Deaf Hero (aka: I See the Crowd Roar) and cast Lane, who he believed had both the perfect "look" and the athletic abilities to portray the role. After altering his Mohawk hairstyle and learning to bat left-handed, Lane spent the spring of 2007 filming on location in Southern California, later re-shooting some key ballpark scenes in Evansville, Indiana in the fall of 2008.

Lane's portrayal of Dummy Hoy led to a series of guest-starring roles on episodic television. In 2008, he guest-starred on the CBS crime drama Cold Case, portraying Andy Rierdan, a popular high school student whose murder is investigated, in the episode "Andy in C Minor". In 2009, he guest-starred on the Fox medical drama House M.D., portraying Seth Miller, a high school wrestler who hears explosions in his head, in the episode "House Divided". In 2010, he guest-starred on the CBS medical drama Miami Medical, portraying Ethan, a patient injured under a collapsed balcony, in the episode "All Fall Down".

In 2011, Lane transitioned to roles in short films, appearing in the science-fiction short Irving J. Koppermelt and the family short drama White Space. That same year, he appeared in Jennette McCurdy's music video for the song "Generation Love". In addition to his film and television roles, Lane has been one of the repertory players at the Deaf West Theatre in North Hollywood, California, appearing in stage productions of ASImprov, Charlie's Version and The "R" Word.

In February 2012, Lane began a recurring role on the ABC Family drama Switched at Birth. On the series, Lane portrays Travis, a lonely and sometimes angry high school student who struggles to communicate with his hearing family at home and develops an unrequited romantic interest in Daphne Vasquez (née Kennish), portrayed by Katie Leclerc. Lane described the differences between his own life and his character's saying, "Travis' parents don't [sign]. My parents do. Travis doesn't have that, so in some ways we're different [...] But I'm embracing this whole [storyline] about his home life."

In September 2012, it was reported that Lane was set to star in the feature film In Other Words, portraying an isolated young man who falls in love with a blind dancer. His film credits include an appearance in No Ordinary Hero: The SuperDeafy Movie (2013), as well as a cameo in Veronica Mars (2014).

== Personal life ==
In September 2006, Lane sustained serious injuries in a dirt bike accident in Pismo Beach, California, which reportedly almost left him paralyzed. While trying to execute a jump, Lane fractured his lower spine and left femur, an injury which required a steel rod and screws to replace the broken section of his spine. His time spent recovering from his injuries, which required him to wear a body brace until January 2007, caused him to miss a significant amount of school, delaying his graduation from CSDR until the fall of 2007. Prior to establishing a career in show business, Lane had expressed an interest in studying to be an auto mechanic at the Universal Technical Institute in Rancho Cucamonga, California. In addition to his interest in motorcycles and mechanics, Lane is proficient in baseball, football, snowboarding, swimming and wrestling. In his free time, he has been involved with the charity Dogs for the Deaf, which trains shelter dogs to be assistance animals to the deaf and hard of hearing.

== Filmography ==
=== Film ===
Year	Title	Role	Notes
2007	Dummy Hoy: A Deaf Hero	William Ellsworth "Dummy" Hoy	aka: I See the Crowd Roar
2011	Irving J. Koppermelt	Irving J. Koppermelt	Short film
2011	White Space	The Poet	Short film
2013	No Ordinary Hero: The SuperDeafy Movie	Himself	
2014	Veronica Mars	Slick Fellow Applicant	

=== Television ===
Year	Title	Role	Notes
2008	Cold Case	Andy Rierdan	Episode: "Andy in C Minor"
2009	House	Seth Miller	Episode: "House Divided"
2010	Miami Medical	Ethan	Episode: "All Fall Down"
2012–2017	Switched at Birth	Travis	Recurring character
2016	iZombie	Kell Guthrie	Episode: "Method Head"

== Accolades ==
In 2013, Lane received the Media Access RJ Mitte Diversity Award for his performance on Switched at Birth.
