= Troy Kotsur =

American actor (born 1968)

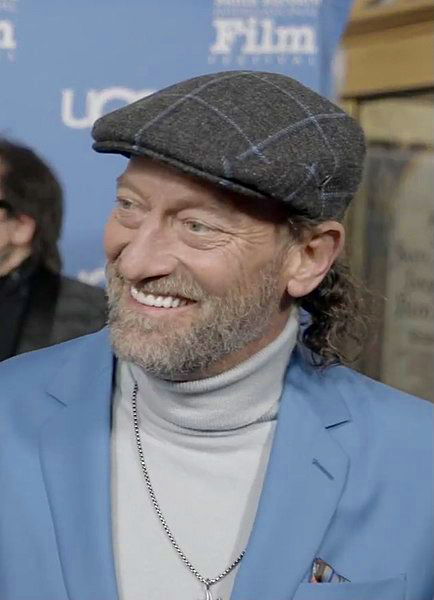
- Kotsur at the 2022 Santa Barbara International Film Festival
- Born: Troy Michael Kotsur; July 24, 1968 (age 58); Mesa, Arizona, U.S.
- Occupation: Actor
- Years active: 1989–present
- Spouse: Deanne Bray (m. 2001)
- Children: 1
- Awards: Academy Award for Best Supporting Actor (2022)

Troy Michael Kotsur (/ˈkɒtsər/; born July 24, 1968) is an American actor. Born deaf, Kotsur made his acting debut in the late 1980s working with the National Theatre of the Deaf. His television debut was in a 2001 episode of Strong Medicine. His film debut was in the 2007 thriller The Number 23. His accolades include a BAFTA Award, an Academy Award, and a nomination for a Golden Globe Award.

After making his Broadway debut in a 2003 revival of Big River, Kotsur's performance in a 2012 production of Cyrano earned him a nomination for the Ovation Award for Best Actor in a Play. He directed and starred in the film No Ordinary Hero: The SuperDeafy Movie (2013) and gained wider attention with his guest role in the Disney+ series The Mandalorian (2019). Kotsur's portrayal of a deaf father in the comedy drama film CODA (2021) was critically acclaimed and won him the Academy Award for Best Supporting Actor, making him the first male deaf actor, and second overall (after Marlee Matlin (Note: Matlin, who stars opposite Kotsur in CODA, won Best Actress in 1986 for Children of a Lesser God.)) to win an acting Oscar.

== Early life and education ==
Kotsur was born and raised in Mesa, Arizona, the largest suburb of Phoenix, on July 24, 1968, to JoDee (née True) and Leonard Stephen "Len" Kotsur, who was Mesa's police chief. When Kotsur was nine months old, his parents discovered that he was deaf and they learned American Sign Language so the family could communicate. His parents encouraged Kotsur to play sports and to make friends with hearing children in their neighborhood. Kotsur attended the Phoenix Day School for the Deaf, where he first became interested in acting. He graduated from Westwood High School, where his drama teacher encouraged him to participate in the senior variety show. He performed a pantomime skit that was positively received and motivated him to pursue theater.

After Kotsur graduated from high school, he interned at KTSP-TV (later KSAZ-TV). While he had aspired to direct films, during the internship he assisted an editor and did not feel connected with people, recalling: "My directing dream poofed after I accepted the fact that I lived in a world that did not use my language." He then attended Gallaudet University from 1987 to 1989 and studied theater, television and film.

== Career ==
When Kotsur received an acting job offer from the National Theatre of the Deaf, he accepted it and left Gallaudet to tour with NTD for two years, performing in two plays. In 1994, he started working at Deaf West Theatre in Los Angeles, California, acting in and directing several productions. On stage, his roles included Stanley in A Streetcar Named Desire, Lenny in Of Mice and Men, and Prince Hamlet in Ophelia.

In 2001, Kotsur and hearing actor Lyle Kanouse were cast together in a Deaf West Theatre production of the 1985 musical Big River. Kotsur and Kanouse both played Huckleberry Finn's father Pap, with Kotsur signing and Kanouse speaking and singing. Big River's success led to the play being performed at the Mark Taper Forum, then to a Broadway revival under Roundabout Theater Company and Deaf West at the American Airlines Theater in New York City. He also had a recurring role on Sue Thomas: F.B.Eye, as well as working as an ASL specialist for the show.

In 2012, Kotsur starred in the play Cyrano, based on Cyrano de Bergerac and a co-production of Deaf West Theatre and The Fountain Theatre. The play, directed by Stephen Sachs, premiered in April 2012. Following Cyrano, Kotsur directed the feature film No Ordinary Hero: The SuperDeafy Movie, which premiered at the Heartland Film Festival in 2013.

In 2016 he starred in Deborah LaVine's independent feature, Wild Prairie Rose. The film won the Jimmy Stewart Legacy award at the Heartland International Film Festival.

In The Mandalorian, the Tusken Raiders use a sign language, and Kotsur was brought on to develop the conlang. He did not mention that he was also an actor for fear that it would come across as sycophantic. But after they found out from his manager, he was cast to play the lead Tusken Raider.

In 2021, Kotsur appeared in the feature film CODA in a supporting role as the deaf father of a hearing teenage daughter. Director Sian Heder first saw his performances in Deaf West productions of Our Town and Edward Albee's At Home at the Zoo and cast him as part of the ensemble. NPR reported that Kotsur's performance in the film "awed both audiences and critics."

In 2025, Kotsur appeared in Foundation as Preem Palver, leader of the Second Foundation.

Kotsur is set to star in Flash Before the Bang, a sports drama television show with an all-deaf cast.

== Awards ==
Kotsur has received numerous awards for his performances, including the Academy Award for Best Supporting Actor, BAFTA Award for Best Actor in a Supporting Role, Critics' Choice Movie Award for Best Supporting Actor, Gotham Independent Film Award for Outstanding Supporting Performance, Independent Spirit Award for Best Supporting Male and Screen Actors Guild Award for Outstanding Performance by a Male Actor in a Supporting Role. His win of the Oscar made him the first male deaf actor, second overall (after Marlee Matlin) to win an Academy Award for acting. He received an Honorary Doctor of Fine Arts degree from Rochester Institute of Technology in 2026.

== Personal life ==
Kotsur is married to Deanne Bray. On September 8, 2005, their daughter, Kyra Monique Kotsur, was born. Kotsur is Catholic.

== Acting credits ==
=== Film ===
Year	Title	Role	Notes
2007	The Number 23	Barnaby	
2008	Universal Signs	Chris	
2009	See What I'm Saying: The Deaf Entertainers Documentary	—N/a	Documentary
2013	No Ordinary Hero: The SuperDeafy Movie	Matt	Also director
2021	CODA	Frank Rossi	Academy Award for Best Supporting Actor
2025	In Cold Light	Will Bly	
2025	Primate	Adam Pinborough	

=== Television ===
Year	Title	Role	Notes
2001	Strong Medicine	Lars	Episode: Fix"
2002–2005	Sue Thomas: F.B.Eye	Troy Myers	5 episodes
2003	Doc	Troy	Episode: "Rules of Engagement"
2006	CSI: NY	Dennis Mitchum	Episode: "Silent Night"
2007	Scrubs	Mr. Frances	Episode: "My Words of Wisdom"
2012	Criminal Minds	John Myers	Episode: "The Silencer"
2019	The Mandalorian	Tusken Raider Scout #1	Episode: "Chapter 5: The Gunslinger"
2023	Super Bowl LVII	himself	National Anthem interpreter
2024	Curb Your Enthusiasm	Himself	Episode: "Vertical Drop, Horizontal Tug"
2025	Foundation	Preem Palver	Season 3
2025	Black Rabbit	Joe Mancuso	Miniseries

=== Theatre ===
Year	Title	Role	Notes	Ref.
1989	In a Room Somewhere		Play by Suzan Zeder, directed by Victor Brown	
1991–1992	Treasure Island		Based on Treasure Island; tour under National Theatre of the Deaf	
1992–1993	Ophelia	Hamlet	Based on Hamlet's character Ophelia; tour under National Theatre of the Deaf	
1993	25 Cents	Harry	New York Deaf Theatre production	
2001	Big River	Pap Finn/The Duke	Kotsur shared role of "Pap" with Lyle Kanouse; produced under Deaf West Theatre	
2002	Big River	Pap Finn/The Duke	Performed at Mark Taper Forum; Kotsur shared role of "Pap" with Lyle Kanouse	
2003	Big River	Pap Finn/The Duke	Broadway revival under Deaf West Theatre and Roundabout Theatre Company; Kotsur shared role of "Pap" with Lyle Kanouse	
2012	Cyrano	Cyrano	Based on Cyrano de Bergerac; produced under Deaf West Theatre	
2014	Spring Awakening	Adult Men	Produced under Deaf West Theatre	

== Accolades ==
Year	Organizations	Category	Work	Result	Ref.
2012	Ovation Awards	Best Lead Actor in a Play	Cyrano	Nominated	
2021	Academy Awards	Best Supporting Actor	CODA	Won	
2021	British Academy Film Awards	Best Actor in a Supporting Role	CODA	Won	
2021	Critics' Choice Awards	Best Supporting Actor	CODA	Won	
2021	Golden Globe Awards	Best Supporting Actor – Motion Picture	CODA	Nominated	
2021	Gotham Awards	Outstanding Supporting Performance	CODA	Won	
2021	Independent Spirit Awards	Best Supporting Male	CODA	Won	
2021	Screen Actors Guild Awards	Outstanding Performance by a Cast in a Motion Picture	CODA	Won	
2021	Screen Actors Guild Awards	Outstanding Performance by a Male Actor in a Supporting Role	CODA	Won	

== See also ==
- List of Academy Award records
- List of actors with Academy Award nominations
- List of actors nominated for Academy Awards for non-English performances
