= Anthony Natale =

Canadian - American actor

- Born: June 13, 1967 (age 59); St. Catharines, Ontario, Canada
- Education: California State University, Northridge
- Occupation: Actor
- Years active: 1989–Present

Anthony Natale (born June 13, 1967) is a deaf Canadian - American actor who has performed in movies such as Jerry Maguire and Mr. Holland's Opus and television shows like Curb Your Enthusiasm, Ellen, and as Captain Thom in Nancy Drew. He also portrayed Cameron Bledsoe on Switched at Birth.

== Early life ==
Anthony Natale was born in St. Catharines, Ontario, Canada. He has an older brother and younger sister. He attended Ernest C. Drury School for the Deaf before transferring to a mainstreaming program for gifted students where he graduated as valedictorian. He then earned a Bachelor of Arts in Film Production and a minor in Theater Arts from California State University, Northridge.

== Career ==
In Mr. Holland's Opus, he played Coltrane "Cole" Holland (age 28), Glenn and Iris' son, who is 90% deaf. He appeared prominently in an episode of the sitcom Ellen in 1997 (episode "Ellen's Deaf Comedy Jam"). He also appeared in Curb Your Enthusiasm and the films Jerry Maguire (1995) and Universal Signs (2008). Most recently, he played Captain Thom in several episodes of Nancy Drew. He also portrayed Cameron Bledsoe on Switched at Birth.

== Personal life ==
He teaches American Sign Language and enjoys fixing up houses in his spare time.

== Filmography ==
Anthony Natale film and television credits
Year	Title	Role	Notes	Ref.
1989	Bridge to Silence	Gentleman Caller	Television film (scenes from play The Glass Menagerie)	
1995	Mr. Holland's Opus	Cole at 28 Years Old	Theatrical film	
1996	Jerry Maguire	Man in Elevator	Theatrical film	
1997	Ellen	Brian	1 episode	
1997	7th Heaven	Waiter	1 episode	
1998	His Bodyguard	Sam Rollston	Television film	
1998	Rude Awakening	Boyd	4 episodes	
1998	Pacific Blue	Kirk	1 episode	
1999	Two Shades of Blue	Todd	Theatrical film	
1999	Once and Again	Bookstore Man	1 episode	
2001–2002	Any Day Now	Paul	3 episodes	
2002	Sorority Boys	Deaf Student	Theatrical film	
2006	Date Movie	Deaf Man	Theatrical film	
2008	Universal Signs	Andrew	Theatrical film	
2011	CSI: Crime Scene Investigation	Dr. Lambert	1 episode	
2011–2014	Switched at Birth	Cameron Bledsoe / Deafenstein	9 episodes	
2013	Baby I Try for You [Tim Sweeney]	ASL Signer	Short film	
2017	Wonderstruck	Dr. Gill, Teacher of the Deaf	Theatrical film	
2017	Curb Your Enthusiasm	Paul Chesnick	1 episode	
2020–2023	Nancy Drew	Captain Thom	10 episodes	
2021	What?	Deaf Passenger in Car	Theatrical film	
2026	Star Trek: Starfleet Academy	President Sadal	1 episode	
