= Universal Signs =

- Directed by: Ann Calamia
- Written by: Ann Calamia
- Starring: Anthony Natale; Sabrina Lloyd; Lupe Ontiveros
- Music by: Joe Renzetti
- Production company: Universal Signs Productions
- Release date: 2008
- Running time: 100 minutes
- Country: United States
- Language: American Sign Language

Universal Signs is a 2008 American drama film made entirely using American Sign Language (ASL). It was written and directed by Ann Calamia.

== Plot ==
After the death of his fiancée’s daughter while in his care, Andrew, a Deaf artist, becomes a prisoner of his own mind. Tormented day and night by memories and self-blame, Andrew falls in a downward spiral of depression and anger that alienates everyone around him. It is only through a serendipitous friendship and new love with Mary that Andrew is able to sense the life around him – forgive himself, rediscover his muse, and experience the transformative power of love.

== Cast ==
- Anthony Natale as Andrew
- Sabrina Lloyd as Mary
- Lupe Ontiveros as Claire
- Margot Kidder as Rose Callahan
- Robert Picardo as Father Joe
- Aimee Garcia as Trish
- Robert Hogan as Mr. Callahan
- Troy Kotsur as Chris
- Deanne Bray as Natalie
- Ashlyn Sanchez as Katie
- Robert DeMayo as The Peddler

== See also ==
- List of films featuring the deaf and hard of hearing
