= In Cold Light =

2025 thriller film by Maxime Giroux

- Theatrical release poster
- Directed by: Maxime Giroux
- Written by: Patrick Whistler
- Produced by: Yanick Létourneau; Mike MacMillan
- Starring: Maika Monroe; Troy Kotsur; Helen Hunt; Allan Hawco
- Cinematography: Sara Mishara
- Edited by: Mathieu Bouchard-Malo
- Music by: Philippe Brault
- Production companies: Périphéria; Lithium Studios
- Distributed by: Elevation Pictures
- Release dates: June 7, 2025 (Tribeca); January 23, 2026 (U.S.); February 27, 2026 (Canada)
- Running time: 97 minutes
- Country: Canada
- Languages: English; American Sign Language

In Cold Light is a 2025 Canadian thriller film directed by Maxime Giroux in his English-language feature debut, from a screenplay written by Patrick Whistler. It stars Maika Monroe, Troy Kotsur, Helen Hunt, and Allan Hawco.

The film premiered at the 2025 Tribeca Festival on June 7, 2025. It was released in the United States on January 23, 2026 by Saban Films, and was released in Canada on February 27, 2026 by Elevation Pictures.

== Cast ==
- Maika Monroe as Ava Bly
- Troy Kotsur as Will Bly, Ava's deaf father
- Jesse Irving as Tom Bly, Ava's twin brother
- Helen Hunt as Claire
- Allan Hawco as Bob Whyte

== Production ==
In July 2021, it was reported that Telefilm Canada would finance on Giroux's first English feature film titled In Cold Light. In May 2023, Maika Monroe and Troy Kotsur was reported to star in the film with XYZ Films handling the rights and presenting the project at the Marché du Film. In June 2023, it was reported that principal photography had been taking place in Alberta, Canada and was set to wrap the next month. In July 2023, the production was granted an interim agreement allowing filming during the 2023 SAG-AFTRA strike.

== Release ==
In Cold Light had its world premiere at the 2025 Tribeca Festival on June 7, 2025, during the Spotlight Narrative section. Saban Films has acquired for the North American distribution rights and released it on January 23, 2026. Elevation Pictures released the film in Canada on February 27, 2026.

=== Critical reception ===
On the review aggregator website Rotten Tomatoes, 58% of 40 critics' reviews are positive, with an average rating of 5.8/10. The website's consensus reads: "While it offers some noteworthy visual flair, In Cold Light's story gets buried under implausible twists, worn out genre beats, and a cast that's never given the chance to shine." On Metacritic, the film has a weighted average score of 49 out of 100 based on five critics, which the site labels as "mixed or average" reviews.

For Original Cin, Liz Braun wrote that "none of it makes any sense, alas, and you’ll stop caring about what happens or who it happens to, fairly early on. There seems to be a lot of pseudo-Freudian yammer in the middle of this crime drama, or perhaps there’s a lot of drug-trade-related violence in the middle of a psychological family study; either way, it’s mystifying as hell."
