= No Ordinary Hero: The SuperDeafy Movie =

- Film poster
- Directed by: Troy Kotsur
- Written by: Taly Ravid
- Produced by: Hilari Scarl; Douglas Matejka
- Starring: John Maucere; Michelle Nunes; Zane Hencker
- Cinematography: Jeff Gatesman
- Edited by: James Cude
- Music by: H. Scott Salinas
- Production companies: Mariposa Creativity, LLC
- Distributed by: DeafNation
- Release date: October 19, 2013
- Running time: 78 minutes
- Country: United States
- Languages: English; American Sign Language

No Ordinary Hero: The SuperDeafy Movie is a 2013 American drama film directed by Troy Kotsur and produced by Douglas Matejka and Hilari Scarl, with music score by H. Scott Salinas. The film stars John Maucere as Tony Kane/SuperDeafy and Zane Hencker as Jacob Lang. The film tells the story of a deaf actor who portrays a superhero on a children's television show and wants to help a young deaf boy who gets bullied at school. The film is open captioned in English.

== Background ==
Gallaudet University Professor Sharon Pajka says:

SuperDeafy is the star of a popular children's television show who dresses in blue with a bright yellow cape and green briefs. His hair is a giant pompadour wig with two distinct pieces sticking out on both sides jokingly "for balance". The emblem on the front of his chest is SuperDeafy's name sign, a crossed double hand "I Love You". He's goofy and animated; the show focuses on teaching ASL (American Sign Language) along with a good dose of charades that children, deaf and hearing, adore.

Deaf comedian, actor, and ASL advocate John Maucere has been performing the SuperDeafy character in the deaf community around the world since 2004, and perhaps as early as about 1998. Maucere has thus become well known in the deaf community internationally.

Troy Kotsur directed a number of webisodes of the SuperDeafy program prior to No Ordinary Hero: The SuperDeafy Movie.

== Plot ==
Eight-year-old Jacob Lang is having a hard time in school, where he is in a class of hearing kids (Jacob is deaf). Although he's trying to learn lip reading, he has difficulty understanding and being understood. He knows ASL but his classmates don't. He longs to fit in and be accepted as an average kid, but that's not happening. Jacob's teacher is recommending that he be put in a class of deaf kids to help his social development and communication skills. Jacob's mother agrees, but his father insists that Jacob will be more "normal" by remaining with hearing kids and becoming more proficient at lip-reading. Jacob is feeling helpless and depressed.

Jacob finds escape from his problems in a TV program named SuperDeafy that is especially for deaf kids. SuperDeafy is about a deaf superhero who gets into comical situations with a police officer. Jacob identifies with SuperDeafy because he, too, is deaf; he fantasizes about being a superhero and surmounting his problems via imagined superpowers.

Tony Kane plays SuperDeafy in the TV program and is deaf in real life. Tony, like Jacob, is having problems due to the self-centeredness and lack of empathy of others. Jacob's teacher, Jenny, is dating Derek (Officer Norm), Tony's supporting character on SuperDeafy. She asks Derek and Tony to come to the school and talk to the school for Diversity Day.

Tony and Derek go to the school for the event, however, Derek upstages Tony by making fun of Tony for being deaf in front of the whole school. This gives a poor image of deaf people, leading people to believe deaf people are a joke and dumb. After, Jenny confronts Derek in the school parking lot telling him how inappropriate his behavior was. Tony meets Jenny in the parking lot and discovers she knows ASL. It is also apparent that Tony falls in love with her. That night, Tony quits being SuperDeafy.

Jenny and Tony fall in love, and he goes on with his life without SuperDeafy. Jenny asks Tony to talk to her class since she sees Jacob is having a difficult time. He does so, and talks to the kids about what it means to be "normal". Tony explains that being normal simply means being one's own unique, authentic self. After hearing this speech, Jacob's classmates become more open to being friends with Jacob and learning ASL.

Jenny and others have a meeting with Jacob's parents and discuss their recommendation to move Jacob into the deaf kids' class. Jacob's dad is still resisting this idea, but over the following weeks he gives it further consideration and changes his mind (and also decides to learn ASL).

== Cast ==
- John Maucere as Tony Kane/SuperDeafy
- Zane Hencker as Jacob Lang (the deaf boy)
- Michelle Nunes as Jenny (Jacob's teacher)
- James Leo Ryan as Patrick Lang (Jacob's father)
- Colleen Foy as Emily Lang (Jacob's mother)
- Peter A. Hulne as Derek/Officer Norm (as Peter Hulne)
- Marlee Matlin as herself
- Sherry Hicks as Marlee's Interpreter
- Garren Stitt as Sammy the Bully
- Barbara Eve Harris as Principal Gwen
- Emjay Anthony as Dean
- Daniela Maucere as Susie
- James Foster as Steve
- Paul Raci as Rudy Gold
- Daniele Gaither as Casting Receptionist
- Shoshannah Stern as herself
- Ashley Fiolek as herself
- Deanne Bray as IEP (Individualized Education Program) Advocate
- Kim Poirier as Erica
- Robert DeMayo as Rally Volunteer
- Ryan Lane as himself
- Bernard Bragg as himself
- Troy Kotsur as Matt
- Hilari Scarl as Director

== Production ==
No Ordinary Hero is the first film in the history of SAG (Screen Actors Guild) commercial feature films to be directed by a deaf director and to be executive-produced exclusively by deaf executive producers.

The movie was filmed on location in Los Angeles and Burbank, California.

The film is rated PG for mild thematic elements.

== Release ==
The world premiere of No Ordinary Hero took place on October 19, 2013, at the Heartland Film Festival in Indianapolis, Indiana.

The film was released on DVD by KimStim, Inc. on August 18, 2015.

== Reception ==
Colleen Foy, who played Jacob's mother in the film, said this in an interview:

[Jacob's] family was clearly a very important part of the film, because we have two stories going on at the same time. We have a family and a depiction of their lives, and then SuperDeafy and his life. And that moment when both of those paths cross, that's when the magic happens. The family story really does establish a beautiful reality that deaf people experience. Really, I'm very proud of this film. It was just an awesome film and it's important for the film world to show audiences and [let deaf people] see depictions of basically their own story put into a feature film. And realize that they aren't alone out there in the world, so it's important for that reason, and we need more characters that show diversity so that way more people can see this for themselves and be inspired and see that they are indeed normal and not alone out there.

Movie reviewer Richard Propes says that No Ordinary Hero is "a must see for parents who desire to have their children grow up celebrating the differences that exist between us."

Reviewer Amos Lassen says that the film "seeks to inspire, but it does so in a realistic way as many of the laughs involving Kane do center around the many challenges he faces living his daily life in a world that doesn't always understand those who appear to be 'different'."

== Awards and honors ==
- Shepard Award for Innovative Filmmaking, 2014, The Rome International Film Festival (USA)
- Best Film, 2014 Dov Film Festival (Stockholm, Sweden)
- Best Film, 2014 Temecula Valley International Film Festival
- The Dove "Family-Approved" Seal for people of all ages

== See also ==
- Deaf education
- Deaf culture
- Deaf culture in the United States
- Ableism
- John Maucere (Italian Wikipedia article)
- List of films featuring the deaf and hard of hearing
