= Robert DeMayo =

Deaf actor and educator

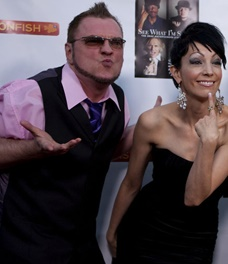
- DeMayo (left) with TL Forsberg

Robert DeMayo is a deaf American actor, educator, and ASL translator. He is one of the subjects of See What I'm Saying: The Deaf Entertainers Documentary (2009) who the New York Times called "staggeringly talented." He has also acted in the films Universal Signs (2008) and No Ordinary Hero: The SuperDeafy Movie (2013).

DeMayo met Hilari Scarl when he was working at the National Theatre of the Deaf which led to his being cast in See What I'm Saying. He created a one-man comedy show about his life called Me Hear NONE which he performed at Philadelphia's Independence Starts Here festival in 2007 and then toured with. He has worked as an ASL consultant and as a theater interpreter at Juilliard.

In 2014 he was cast as the lead role in The Strange Case of Dr. Jekyll and Mr. Hyde at the New York Deaf Theater.

DeMayo has created a 30-episode 10-DVD educational series of videos about sign language and deaf culture called Sign With Robert created for classroom use. In 2017 he worked with Giphy to create a series of 2,000 animated GIFs of him performing ASL words and phrases to help others learn sign language. The GIFs have been viewed 2.4 billion times as of February 2022.

== Personal life ==
DeMayo was born in Connecticut and currently lives in Pennsylvania. He has been deaf since birth and is a graduate of the American School for the Deaf in West Hartford.
