= Lake Windfall =

- Directed by: Roger Vass Jr.
- Written by: Tony Nitko; Roger Vass Jr.
- Produced by: Kathleen Murbarger
- Starring: Christopher B. Corrigan; Alex Laferriere; Jasun Hicks; J. William Sanders; Timothy J. Dillard
- Production company: Rustic Lantern Films
- Release date: April 6, 2013
- Running time: 105 minutes
- Country: United States
- Languages: American Sign Language; English
- Budget: $70,000 (estimated)

Lake Windfall is a 2013 American post-apocalyptic movie written by Tony Nitko and Roger Vass Jr, and directed by Roger Vass Jr. The film was produced by Rustic Lantern Films, as subsidiary of Deaf Empowerment Awareness Foundation. The film focuses on the interaction between five friends who set off for a weekend of camping. It explores issues around Deaf, hard-of-hearing, and hearing people. The primary language is American Sign Language with closed captioned subtitles throughout, though early stages of the movie contain dialog in voice, with subtitles.

== Plot ==
The film begins with five friends who are organizing a weekend camping trip to a Missouri lake. Three of the friends are deaf, one is a hearing child of deaf adult (CODA) and the last is a hearing person. The film focuses on the interaction between the friends, and mirrors the interactions between 'Big-D' Deaf, hard-of-hearing, CODAs and hearing people.

As the friends set off for the weekend, Jake (Jasun Hicks) has a heated discussion with his mom over video relay service (VRS) using his iPad. Cliff (Timothy Dillard) is watching and is fascinated by the speed of Jake's signing and seems unaware of the nature of the conversation. Cliff identifies as hard-of-hearing and has only recently begun learning ASL as he was brought up orally and was mainstream schooled. He is a nerdy guy, technology-addicted, and wears a hearing aid. At the beginning of the movie, he tries to align himself with the hearing people, to the annoyance of Jake. During the campfire that night, the two hearing guys sit around one side of the fire chatting. Cliff joins them and tries to follow their conversation but gets confused. Keith (Will Sanders), the hearing guy, gets annoyed with him and Cliff wanders off to the other side of the fire where the deaf men are chatting. The two deaf guys, Matt (Christopher B. Corrigan) and Jake, chide Cliff for trying to be part of the hearing world, while they were laughing at him. They play a trick on Jake by giving him a sign name. He is pleased by this and goes to tell Drew (Alex Laferriere) who tells him that it actually the sign for penis. The others laugh at this, and he is infuriated.

Later, Matt and Drew are arguing and the audience learns that Drew is Matt's brother. A CODA, he has distanced himself from Matt and his deaf parents; his new wife had taken their calls and told them that Drew was not in. His wife has never learnt to sign, and it seems that she has played a part in Drew's disconnect from the rest of his family. Matt tells Drew that their mother has stage-2 breast cancer and he is shocked.

In the morning, Keith and Drew take the boat and go fishing in the lake without telling the others. They eventually wake up but the two other guys will not return. Instead, Jake goes to the truck where Cliff and Matt learn that he has brought his late father's rifle along on the trip. They all decide to take off for a few hours and do some target shooting. They go into the woods where they find a barn and set up some cans as targets. Matt and Keith are reasonably adept at shooting but Cliff has never fired a gun before, so he messes it up. The guys go off down a forest track to explore. Cliff needs a bathroom break, so he steps out behind a tree. Right at that moment, Jake spies a deer in the woods and decides to shoot it. Matt tries to stop him. Just as he is about to press the trigger on the rifle, something happens and they are flung to the ground. The world spins around them and the birds fly up. When Matt and Jake pick themselves up, they see the deer lying on its side, apparently dead. Jake checks his gun and, to his surprise, finds that the shot had not been fired. The deer suddenly gets up and runs into the clearing. Jake reloads, takes a few hurried shots at the deer and misses. It's then that they realize that Jake has accidentally shot Cliff in the lower left abdomen.

They eventually go back to the lake, where they meet up back with Keith and Drew. None of their phones work anymore, cars will not start and electric-powered devices no longer work. Keith is no longer able to hear as the cataclysmic event has deafened him. He does not handle this very well, can 'hear' phantom sounds, and is unable to communicate with the others. They keep going through the woods where they find a cabin lit with oil lamps. It appears empty, and they go in to investigate. There, they find a stack of notes where the occupants - a family - were deafened and were frantically writing notes to each other. Jake goes to investigate the basement where he discovers the father hiding. There is an altercation and both of them are shot and killed.

The brothers Matt and Drew escape from the house, along with Keith by taking a diesel Jeep and push-starting it. While they are getting the Jeep ready, Cliff dies from blood-loss. They stop briefly at a gas station where Keith is shot and killed by the owner. Drew is saved by his brother Matt, who shoots and kills the owner but is injured in the process. The main story ends with the brothers driving along while Drew is frantically trying to keep his brother alive.

As the movie ends, the epilog shows us a view of the future. It transpires that the vast majority of people on the planet had been deafened by a cosmic event known as the "Soundfall". The world falls into disarray and chaos but we learn that it is rehabilitated much sooner than expected thanks to a minority community (the Deaf world) which nurtured and kept ASL alive, and it was this that the world turned to. The audience then discovers that the person telling us these is actually the President of the United States and that he is deaf, too.

== Film Awards ==
(Best Thriller 2013) Toronto International Deaf Films & Arts Festival 4/9-12/13

== Official Selections ==
13th Annual Whitaker St. Louis Filmmakers Showcase 7/18/2013

22nd Whitaker St. Louis International Film Festival 10/22/2013

== See also ==
- List of films featuring the deaf and hard of hearing

== Sources ==
Fashion News Live http://www.fashionnewslive.com/2013/03/22/lake-windfall-movie-review/

St. Louis Post Dispatch http://interact.stltoday.com/pr/arts-entertainment/PR030613041312110

iDeaf News http://read.ideafnews.com/2013/04/rustic-lantern-films-red-carpet-lake-windfall-hosted-by-jonathan-kovacs/
