= See What I'm Saying: The Deaf Entertainers Documentary =

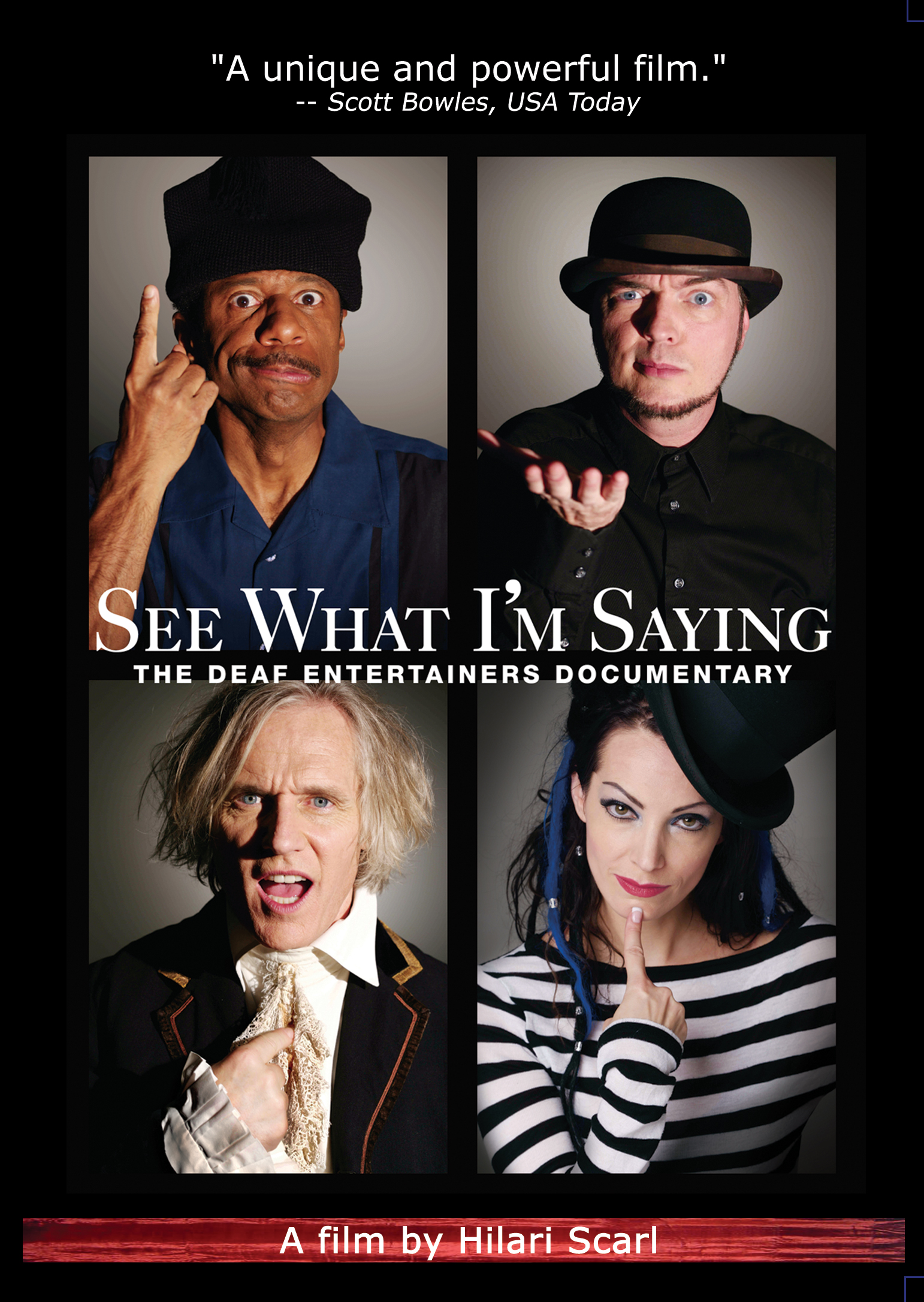
- Teaser poster
- Directed by: Hilari Scarl
- Produced by: Hilari Scarl
- Starring: CJ Jones, Robert DeMayo, TL Forsberg, Bob Hiltermann
- Cinematography: Jeff Gatesman
- Music by: Kubilay Uner
- Distributed by: Worldplay, Inc., Cinedigm
- Release dates: April 2009 (Newport Beach); March 19, 2010
- Running time: 90 minutes
- Country: United States
- Languages: ASL; English

See What I'm Saying: The Deaf Entertainers Documentary is a 2009 feature documentary produced and directed by Hilari Scarl. It focuses on the lives of deaf entertainers Bob Hiltermann, TL Forsberg, CJ Jones, and Robert DeMayo and their attempts to cross over to mainstream audiences. These talented entertainers overcome great challenges on their way to personal triumphs and professional success.

== Reception ==
The film was cited as a necessary look at the world of deaf performers.

The film won awards at five film festivals (Newport Beach, Philadelphia International, Jury Award at the DC Deaf Film Festival Jury, World Deaf Cinema and Perspektiva Moscow Film Festival) was an Official Selection at dozens of other film festivals. The film screened in 800 cities in 19 countries and was also part of an exhibit at the New Britain Museum of American Art that focused on deaf culture.

== See also ==
- List of films featuring the deaf and hard of hearing
