= A Silent Agreement =

2017 Australian romantic drama film

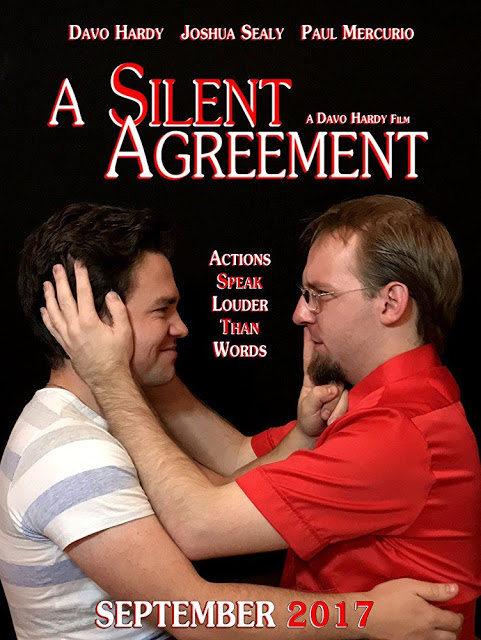
- Directed by: Davo Hardy
- Written by: Davo Hardy
- Produced by: Davo Hardy
- Starring: Davo Hardy; Joshua Sealy; Paul Mercurio
- Cinematography: Bebi Zekirovski
- Edited by: Davo Hardy
- Music by: Jamie Murgatroyd
- Production company: Davo Hardy Productions
- Distributed by: davohardyfilms.com
- Release date: 28 September 2017
- Running time: 134 minutes
- Country: Australia
- Languages: English and Auslan (Australian Sign Language)

A Silent Agreement is a 2017 Australian romantic drama film written and directed by Davo Hardy. It was the first theatrically released, cinematic film to feature Auslan (Australian Sign Language) as both a main language of the film's dialogue, as well as a key plot element in the story.

The plot concerns Reuben (played by Davo Hardy), who overcomes a speech impediment with the use of Auslan, with help from his profoundly deaf boyfriend (played by Joshua Sealy). Having built up Reuben's confidence enough to encourage his higher ambitions, Derek contacts an Australian screen legend, Gareth (played by Paul Mercurio) to help mentor Reuben in his burgeoning career. But shortly after seeing the potential in Reuben's autobiographical screenplay, Gareth takes over the project for his own gain and sanitizes the story to suit a wider audience, thereby cutting Reuben out of the equation. Forced to draw upon the courage and self-actualization that he has gathered through the experience, Reuben stands up to his bully and wins the support of those who had once opposed him, for the greater moral good.

Davo Hardy has stated in interviews that the film was a response to his film mentors telling him he could not be a director because of his real-life stutter.

== Plot ==
Reuben Heywood is an aspiring writer, who grapples with anxiety, manifesting as a stutter, while attempting to build a career as both a writer and actor. When a performance at an amateur theatre showcase goes awry, Reuben is bullied by the troupe leader and a sign language interpreter. Derek Shanahan, a profoundly deaf man from the audience (played by Joshua Sealy) comes to vindicate him and the two form a friendship which quickly turns into a sexual relationship.

As Derek and Reuben discuss their mutual ambitions within the arts and political activism, Reuben discloses his troubled past and the origins of his speech impediment. Derek encourages Reuben to steer his work away from theater and into independent film, offering to support him, where needed. Shortly after, Derek seeks out Reuben's dream mentor, Gareth Donahue (played by Paul Mercurio) to help him bring his story, titled The Burden of Being Me to the screen.

Gareth, meanwhile, has reached a low point in his career. He is over 50, lamenting his lost youth and fading career. Hungry for a chance to make a comeback, Gareth agrees to meet with Reuben and discuss their collaboration on The Burden of Being Me. Derek is also present at the meeting and is quick to point out Gareth's self-obsessed narcissism. but Reuben overlooks his observations, blindsided by the support that Gareth offers. Derek's mother, Faye Shanahan, and sister, Courtney, are deeply protective of Derek and treat Reuben's artistic ambitions with skepticism. Faye, a painter, discourages Derek's involvement with Reuben's filmmaking, in favor of noble causes to support deaf education and advocating human rights in the footsteps of Helen Keller. Reuben recognizes the hypocrisy and continues to pursue his film with Derek and Gareth.

Almost immediately after receiving the script of The Burden of Being Me, Gareth begins to amend the characters and plot to suit him as both an actor and a producer. His wife, Lillian Donahue, a highly respected entertainment attorney, is captivated by the screenplay and recognizes Reuben as a talented writer. But Gareth uses his industry expertise and gas-lighting tactics to seize creative control from Reuben, while also manipulating Lillian to help him, using her long-delayed desire to have children as leverage for emotional blackmail. Obediently, Lillian writes up contracts that highly favor Gareth's interests and leave Reuben empty handed. Immediately conflicted by guilt, Lillian stands idly by, as Gareth pressures Reuben to sign the contracts and grant him 100% of the rights. When Reuben realizes that he has been swindled, Faye offers to help finance Reuben's next project, effectively giving her blessing for he and Derek to collaborate in the future. This offer is quickly retracted when Reuben accidentally makes a spectacle of himself at Courtney's engagement party and embarrasses the family. Derek sides with Faye, citing that Reuben has acted in appropriately. Reuben is asked to leave the party, at once.

Shortly after, Reuben receives an emotional call from Courtney, saying that Derek has suddenly died from an accident. At the funeral, Faye confronts Reuben, imploring him to continue honoring Derek's memory, but also to honor himself. Meanwhile, Lillian reads an article about Reuben's stage play, dedicated to Derek's memory. Gareth's only response is to make sure the stage play has no affiliation with the film he now owns the rights to, or else they'd have to sue. Incensed at Gareth's heartlessness, Lillian lashes out at him and vows to reverse the contracts that she had made for Gareth. Concluding that her chance to have children has passed her by, Lillian abandons Gareth and seeks Reuben out at the theater, where he and Derek met. She encourages him to rewrite his story from scratch and amend key elements, so that Gareth cannot claim copyright infringement. Similarly, Faye reinstates her support of Reuben, around the time of her first Christmas since her son's death.

One by one, Gareth's collaborators abandon his project and he is left without any supporters at around the time that Reuben develops his new film, The Purpose of Being Me. At the a screening of his film, Reuben thanks the audience for attending, including those who may have originally discouraged him. He thanks them for providing the strength he needed to continue in his pursuits, even if it was only to prove them wrong. As a final thought, Reuben comes to terms with his speech impediment and thanks those who supported his journey, saying "actions speak louder than words."

== Cast ==
- Davo Hardy as Reuben Heywood
- Joshua Sealy as Derek Shanahan
- Paul Mercurio as Gareth Donahue
- Sage Godrei as Lillian Donahue
- Jennifer Maclaughlan as Courtney Shanahan
- Rhonda Rourke as Faye Shanahan

== Reception ==
Premiering in Sydney, Australia, on 28 September 2017, at the height of the Australian Marriage Law Postal Survey, the film gained immediate attention for its unapologetic depiction of same-sex relationships without a plot revolving around coming-out, homophobia or the sex industry, effectively showing an everyday slice of life for a couple who happen to be two men. The film also brought Paul Mercurio back into the spotlight. On 11 April 2017, during a live interview for The Morning Show, the hosts Larry Emdur and Kylie Gillies attempted to discuss the 25-year anniversary of Strictly Ballroom, but Paul continued to steer the conversation back to A Silent Agreement. He was cast in Promised a few months later.

The film was submitted into many festivals for its use of Auslan, qualifying it as a foreign language film. Many LGBT-related festivals and organisations to do with the deaf and disabilities were lauding of A Silent Agreement for its authentic depictions of deaf characters, using deaf actors.

The DVD was released in Australia on 8 December 2018, after its extended festival screenings; including special seminar screenings for its educational importance in support of Auslan and speech pathology. LGBT streaming service Dekkoo began to distribute the film from June 2019. Amazon released an NTSC DVD in September 2019.

From 2022, A Silent Agreement, along with the rest of Davo Hardy's films, were made available on his dedicated streaming website; www.davohardyfilms.com.

=== Accolades ===
Award	Category	Subject	Result
Dreamanila International Film Festival	Grand Jury Prize for Best Film	Davo Hardy	Nominated
Dreamanila International Film Festival	Grand Jury Prize for Best Director	Davo Hardy	Nominated
Dreamanila International Film Festival	Jury Award for Best Leading Actor	Davo Hardy	Nominated
Dreamanila International Film Festival	Jury Award for Best Leading Actor	Joshua Sealy	Nominated
Dreamanila International Film Festival	Jury Award for Best Leading Actor	Paul Mercurio	Nominated
Sydney Indie Film Festival	Best Film	Davo Hardy	Nominated
Sydney Indie Film Festival	Best Male Lead Actor	Davo Hardy	Nominated
Sydney Indie Film Festival	Best Male Lead Actor	Paul Mercurio	Nominated
Los Angeles Cinefest	Best Indie Film	Davo Hardy	Nominated
