= Deaf Movie Database =

Media platform

- Founder: Emilio Insolera
- Website: deafmovie.org
- Written in: PHP (WordPress)

The Deaf Movie Database (DMDb) is an online platform dedicated to cataloging films, television series, and media content featuring deaf actors, sign language, and themes related to deaf culture. The database serves as a resource for researchers, filmmakers, and audiences interested in representation and accessibility in the entertainment industry.

== History and development ==
The Deaf Movie Database was established by Emilio Insolera, a deaf actor and producer, to address the lack of centralized information on deaf cinema. While mainstream film databases often include works featuring deaf characters, they do not comprehensively track films created by or for the deaf community. DMDb was created to bridge this gap, offering a specialized collection of productions where sign language and authentic deaf representation play a central role.

The database is publicly accessible online, allowing users to browse or search for specific titles. Some listings include links to streaming platforms, enabling direct access to films.

== Feature and content ==
=== Titles Section ===
The Deaf Movie Database includes a wide range of media content, from films and short films to TV series, documentaries, and web series. Each entry in the database provides details such as the title, director, release date, cast, languages spoken and signed, and a plot summary.

The DMDb also tracks the percentage of sign language usage in films, categorizing them based on the extent to which sign language is integrated. Movies in the database are classified as follows:

- Full Sign Language Films (50–100%): Films where sign language is the primary mode of communication.
- High Sign Language Films (25–50%): Movies with a substantial portion of dialogue in sign language.
- Moderate Sign Language Films (10–25%): Productions featuring notable but not dominant use of sign language.
- Minimal Sign Language Films (1–10%): Films that include occasional use of sign language in specific scenes or for certain characters.
- Rare Sign Language Films (0–1%): Movies with very limited or brief instances of sign language.

=== Career Section ===
The database also features a Career Section, providing job opportunities for both cast and crew members. This section connects deaf and hearing professionals with filmmakers, casting agents, and production teams looking to hire talent with experience in deaf cinema. Users can browse job listings, submit their portfolios, and network within the industry.

=== Community Section ===
The Community Section of the Deaf Movie Database provides a list of film festivals dedicated to deaf cinema, helping users discover events that celebrate and promote deaf filmmakers and stories. Additionally, it includes a "Dummies" page, offering introductory guides on various aspects of deaf cinema, including filmmaking, accessibility, and the use of sign language in media.

== Importance and impact ==
The Deaf Movie Database plays a vital role in raising awareness and appreciation of deaf cinema. It provides filmmakers with a platform to showcase their work and serves as a hub for deaf professionals to connect with major studios.

By highlighting authentic deaf narratives, DMDb creates more opportunities for deaf actors and filmmakers, fostering a more inclusive film industry. It also offers hearing audiences insight into deaf culture through accurate and diverse portrayals.

Additionally, DMDb serves as an educational resource, helping students and scholars explore the evolution of deaf representation in media.
