= TL Forsberg =

American singer

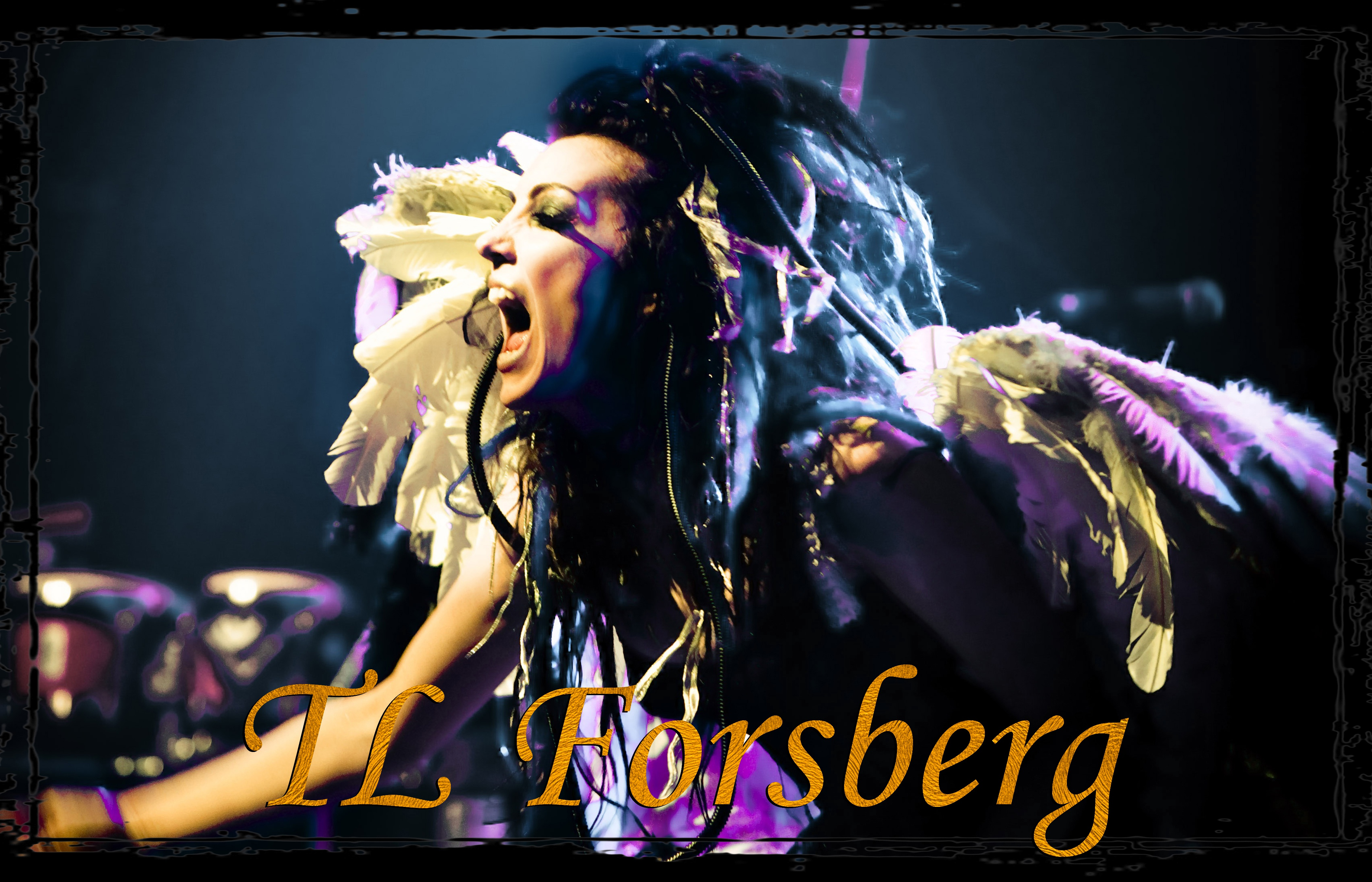

Background information
- Born: 8 September, 1971; Nova Scotia, Canada
- Genres: Avant-garde rock with American Sign Language
- Occupations: Singer, songwriter, actress
- Website: www.tlforsberg.com

TL Forsberg (born 8 September in Nova Scotia, Canada) is a Canadian hard of hearing singer, songwriter and actress. She is a graduate of George Brown Theatre School, Forsberg performed as the singer/front person for the band KRIYA which opened for Alanis Morissette and Tori Amos at the Molson Canadian Amphitheatre in 1999. Forsberg, is perhaps most known for her candidacy as the hard of hearing singer as one of four subjects, along with CJ Jones, Bob Hilterman, Robert De Mayo profiled in the 2010 award-winning documentary See What I'm Saying: The Deaf Entertainers Documentary.

As an actress she starred in the short film Simone.

She also performed the role of Magician Assistant in a 2009 Deaf West/Center Theater Group production of Pippin at the Mark Taper Forum.

Other TV/Film: Out of Step, Exhibit A: Secret of Forensic Science, Fight for Justice, His Bodyguard, Falcone, Hendrix, La Femme Nikita, and Earth: The Final Conflict.

As a musical performer and fashion stylist, Forsberg appeared opposite rockers Sebastian Bach (Skid Row), Scott Ian (Anthrax), Evan Seinfeld (Biohazard), and Ted Nugent on VH1's reality TV series Supergroup. Her performances were featured on Much Music, MTV (Fuse), The New Music and City TV, Ozzfest 2006, San Diego's 105.3 Rock Radio and Hollywoodmusic.tv.

Recently she performed ASL musical translations with rappers Cee-Lo and T-Pain on FUSE TV's production "Lay it Down" and on NBC's Season Two of The Voice performing opposite opera singer and finalist Chris Mann.

Forsberg is most known to date for her portrayal of Olivia, Camryn's stunning alternative hard of hearing girlfriend, on ABC's hit TV series, Switched at Birth.

Forsberg resides in Los Angeles.
