= CJ Jones =

American actor (born 1950)

- Jones in 2014
- Born: September 29, 1950 (age 75); St. Louis, Missouri, U.S.
- Education: Missouri School for the Deaf
- Occupation: Actor

CJ Jones (born September 29, 1950) is an American actor. He is one of the subjects of See What I'm Saying: The Deaf Entertainers Documentary (2009). Jones made his feature film debut with Edgar Wright's Baby Driver (2017), in which he portrays Joseph, the deaf foster father of Ansel Elgort's protagonist.

He has developed three one-man shows that have toured the United States, Japan, Sweden, Australia, Ecuador, and Canada. He co-wrote and directed six classic fairy tales for children's television for the series Once Upon a Sign. CJ produced the International Sign Language Theater Festival, which hosted theater artists from all over the world. He has also appeared in various episodes of American TV series.

Jones created a Na'vi sign language for Avatar: The Way of Water, in which he plays a Na'vi.

== Personal life ==
CJ Jones is the son of deaf parents who communicated in American Sign Language. One of seven hearing children born to the couple, he lost his hearing at the age of 7 when he fell ill with spinal meningitis. He attended Missouri School for the Deaf. Active in sports, he was voted class valedictorian. He remains active in deaf awareness causes and charities.

== Filmography ==
=== Film ===
Year	Title	Role	Notes
2009	See What I'm Saying: The Deaf Entertainers Documentary	Himself	Documentary
2017	Baby Driver	Joe	
2019	Door in the Woods	Uriah	
2022	Avatar: The Way of Water	Metkayina Interpreter	uncredited
2025	True Value	Himself	Documentary

=== Television ===
Year	Title	Role	Notes
1991	A Different World	CJ	Episode: "A Word in Edgewise"
2003	Cold Case	Junkie	Episode: "The Runner"
2003	Frasier	Customer #1	Episode: "I'm Listening"
2007	Lincoln Heights	Luther	Episode: "House Arrest"
2018	Castle Rock	Odin Branch	3 episodes
2019	This Close	Craig	2 episodes
2021	Everything's Gonna Be Okay	Eric	2 episodes
2023	The Last of Us	—N/a	Episode: "Endure and Survive" (ASL consultant)
