= List of accolades received by CODA (2021 film) =

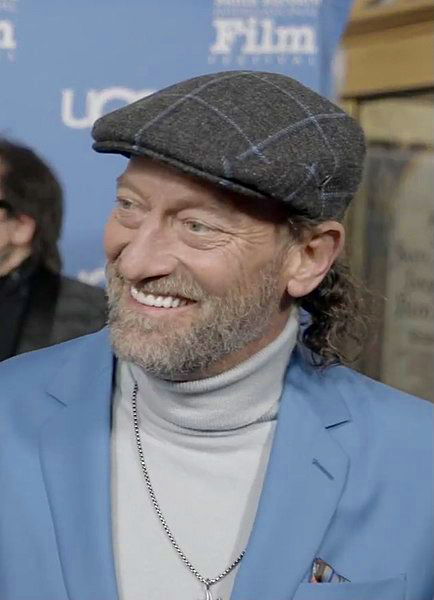
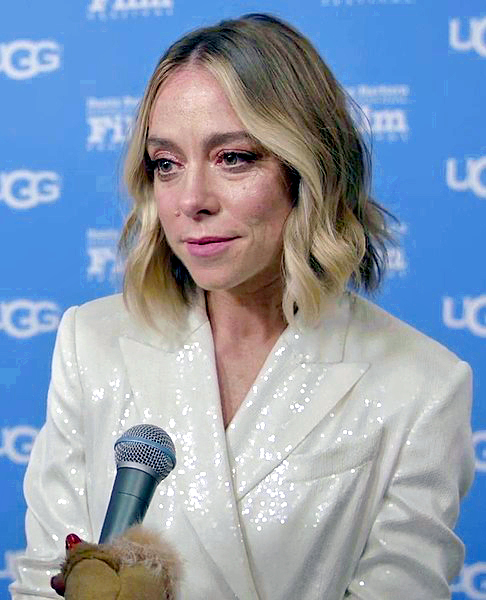
- Troy Kotsur (left) received critical acclaim for his performance and won the Academy Award for Best Supporting Actor, while Sian Heder (right) received praise for direction and screenplay.
Accolades
Award	Wins	Nominations
AARP Movies for Grownups Awards	1	2
Academy Awards	3	3
Alliance of Women Film Journalists	1	5
American Film Institute Awards	1	1
Austin Film Critics Association	0	2
Boston Society of Film Critics	1	1
British Academy Film Awards	2	3
Casting Society of America	1	1
Chlotrudis Awards	0	1
Chicago Film Critics Association	0	2
Dallas–Fort Worth Film Critics Association Awards	0	2
Detroit Film Critics Society	0	5
Dorian Awards	0	1
Georgia Film Critics Association	0	5
Golden Globe Awards	0	2
Gotham Awards	2	3
Guild of Music Supervisors Awards	0	3
Heartland Film Festival	1	1
Hollywood Critics Association Film Awards	3	9
Hollywood Music in Media Awards	2	5
Houston Film Critics Society	0	5
Independent Spirit Awards	1	1
Japan Academy Film Prize	0	1
Location Managers Guild Awards	0	1
London Film Critics' Circle	0	1
National Board of Review	1	1
Norwegian International Film Festival	1	1
Miskolc International Film Festival	0	1
NAACP Image Awards	1	1
Online Film Critics Society	0	1
Palm Springs International Film Festival	1	1
San Diego Film Critics Society	1	5
San Francisco Bay Area Film Critics Circle	0	2
Santa Barbara International Film Festival	2	2
Satellite Awards	1	4
Screen Actors Guild Awards	2	2
Seattle Film Critics Society	1	3
Set Decorators Society of America Awards	0	1
St. Louis Film Critics Association Awards	0	1
Sundance Film Festival	1	4
Vancouver Film Critics Circle	1	2
Washington D.C. Area Film Critics Association	0	3
Women Film Critics Circle Awards	0	5
Writers Guild of America Awards	1	1

Totals (Note: Certain award groups do not simply award one winner. They acknowledge several different recipients, have runners-up, and have third place. Since this is a specific recognition and is different from losing an award, runner-up mentions are considered wins in this award tally. For simplification and to avoid errors, each award in this list has been presumed to have had a prior nomination.)
- Wins: 39
- Nominations: 112

CODA is a 2021 coming-of-age comedy-drama film written and directed by Sian Heder. An adaptation of the French-Belgian film La Famille Bélier (2014), it stars Emilia Jones as the titular child of deaf adults (CODA) and the only hearing member of a deaf family, who attempts to help their struggling fishing business while pursuing her desire to be a singer. The film's cast includes Troy Kotsur, Marlee Matlin, Daniel Durant, Eugenio Derbez, and Ferdia Walsh-Peelo in supporting roles. After debuting at the 2021 Sundance Film Festival on January 28, 2021, the film's distribution rights were purchased by Apple Inc. for a festival-record of $25 million. It was released in theaters and through the Apple TV+ streaming service on August 13, 2021.

The film garnered awards and nominations in a variety of categories with particular praise for Heder's screenplay and Kotsur's performance as Frank Rossi. CODA won all three categories it was nominated in at the 94th Academy Awards: Best Picture, Best Supporting Actor (Kotsur), and Best Adapted Screenplay (Heder). It is the first Best Picture winner to be distributed via a streaming platform and the first starring a primarily deaf cast. Furthermore, Kotsur became the first male deaf person and second overall deaf performer to win an acting Oscar after his co-star Matlin won for her lead performance in the 1986 film Children of a Lesser God. It won two awards at the 75th British Academy Film Awards for Best Actor in Supporting Role (Kotsur) and Best Adapted Screenplay (Heder), while Jones was nominated for Best Actress in a Leading Role.

At the 33rd Producers Guild of America Awards, CODA won the award for Best Theatrical Motion Picture. Heder received honors for Best Adapted Screenplay at the 74th Writers Guild of America Awards. The film won an award for Outstanding Performance by a Cast in a Motion Picture at the 28th Screen Actors Guild Awards, and Kotsur received the award for Outstanding Performance by a Male Actor in a Supporting Role at the same ceremony. Kotsur was also named Best Supporting Actor at the 27th Critics' Choice Awards. Both the National Board of Review and American Film Institute included CODA in their top 10 films of 2021.

== Accolades ==
Accolades received by CODA
Award	Date of ceremony	Category	Recipient(s)	Result	Ref.
AARP Movies for Grownups Awards	March 18, 2022	Best Intergenerational Film	CODA	Won	
AARP Movies for Grownups Awards	March 18, 2022	Best Supporting Actress	Marlee Matlin	Nominated	
Academy Awards	March 27, 2022	Best Picture	Philippe Rousselet, Fabrice Gianfermi and Patrick Wachsberger	Won	
Academy Awards	March 27, 2022	Best Supporting Actor	Troy Kotsur	Won	
Academy Awards	March 27, 2022	Best Adapted Screenplay	Siân Heder	Won	
Alliance of Women Film Journalists	January 25, 2022	Best Actor in a Supporting Role	Troy Kotsur	Nominated	
Alliance of Women Film Journalists	January 25, 2022	Best Screenplay, Adapted	Siân Heder	Nominated	
Alliance of Women Film Journalists	January 25, 2022	Best Woman Director	Siân Heder	Nominated	
Alliance of Women Film Journalists	January 25, 2022	Best Woman Screenwriter	Siân Heder	Nominated	
Alliance of Women Film Journalists	January 25, 2022	Best Woman's Breakthrough Performance	Emilia Jones	Won	
American Film Institute Awards	March 11, 2022	Top 10 Movies of the Year	CODA	Won	
Austin Film Critics Association	January 11, 2022	Best Adapted Screenplay	Siân Heder	Nominated	
Austin Film Critics Association	January 11, 2022	Breakthrough Artist Award	Emilia Jones	Nominated	
Boston Society of Film Critics	December 12, 2021	Best Supporting Actor	Troy Kotsur	Won	
British Academy Film Awards	March 13, 2022	Best Leading Actress	Emilia Jones	Nominated	
British Academy Film Awards	March 13, 2022	Best Supporting Actor	Troy Kotsur	Won	
British Academy Film Awards	March 13, 2022	Best Adapted Screenplay	Siân Heder	Won	
Casting Society of America	March 23, 2022	Studio or Independent Feature – Drama	Deborah Aquila, Tricia Wood, Lisa Zagoria, Angela Peri, Lisa Lobel, and Melissa Morris	Won	
Chicago Film Critics Association	December 15, 2021	Most Promising Performer	Emilia Jones	Nominated	
Chicago Film Critics Association	December 15, 2021	Most Promising Filmmaker	Siân Heder	Nominated	
Chlotrudis Awards	March 20, 2022	Best Adapted Screenplay	Siân Heder	Nominated	
Critics' Choice Movie Awards	March 13, 2022	Best Picture	CODA	Nominated	
Critics' Choice Movie Awards	March 13, 2022	Best Supporting Actor	Troy Kotsur	Won	
Critics' Choice Movie Awards	March 13, 2022	Best Adapted Screenplay	Siân Heder	Nominated	
Critics' Choice Movie Awards	March 13, 2022	Best Young Actor/Actress	Emilia Jones	Nominated	
Dallas–Fort Worth Film Critics Association Awards	December 20, 2021	Best Picture	CODA	10th place	
Dallas–Fort Worth Film Critics Association Awards	December 20, 2021	Best Supporting Actor	Troy Kotsur	2nd place	
Detroit Film Critics Society	January 14, 2022	Best Film	CODA	Nominated	
Detroit Film Critics Society	January 14, 2022	Best Supporting Actor	Troy Kotsur	Nominated	
Detroit Film Critics Society	January 14, 2022	Best Screenplay	Siân Heder (Adapted)	Nominated	
Detroit Film Critics Society	January 14, 2022	Best Ensemble	CODA	Nominated	
Detroit Film Critics Society	January 14, 2022	Breakthrough Award	Emilia Jones	Nominated	
Dorian Awards	March 17, 2022	Best Supporting Film Performance	Troy Kotsur	Nominated	
Georgia Film Critics Association	January 14, 2022	Best Picture	CODA	Nominated	
Georgia Film Critics Association	January 14, 2022	Best Supporting Actor	Troy Kotsur	Nominated	
Georgia Film Critics Association	January 14, 2022	Best Adapted Screenplay	Siân Heder	Nominated	
Georgia Film Critics Association	January 14, 2022	Best Ensemble	CODA	Nominated	
Georgia Film Critics Association	January 14, 2022	Breakthrough Award	Emilia Jones	Nominated	
Golden Globe Awards	January 9, 2022	Best Motion Picture – Drama	CODA	Nominated	
Golden Globe Awards	January 9, 2022	Best Supporting Actor – Motion Picture	Troy Kotsur	Nominated	
Gotham Awards	November 29, 2021	Outstanding Supporting Performance	Troy Kotsur	Won	
Gotham Awards	November 29, 2021	Outstanding Supporting Performance	Marlee Matlin	Nominated	
Gotham Awards	November 29, 2021	Breakthrough Performer	Emilia Jones	Won	
Guild of Music Supervisors Awards	March 20, 2022	Best Music Supervision in a Trailer	Will Quiney	Nominated	
Heartland Film Festival	August 13, 2021	Truly Moving Picture Award	CODA	Won	
Hollywood Critics Association Film Awards	February 28, 2022	Best Picture	CODA	Won	
Hollywood Critics Association Film Awards	February 28, 2022	Best Actress	Emilia Jones	Nominated	
Hollywood Critics Association Film Awards	February 28, 2022	Best Supporting Actor	Troy Kotsur	Won	
Hollywood Critics Association Film Awards	February 28, 2022	Best Supporting Actress	Marlee Matlin	Nominated	
Hollywood Critics Association Film Awards	February 28, 2022	Best Cast Ensemble	CODA	Nominated	
Hollywood Critics Association Film Awards	February 28, 2022	Best Director	Siân Heder	Nominated	
Hollywood Critics Association Film Awards	February 28, 2022	Best Adapted Screenplay	Siân Heder	Won	
Hollywood Critics Association Film Awards	February 28, 2022	Best Indie Film	CODA	Nominated	
Hollywood Critics Association Film Awards	February 28, 2022	Best Original Song	"Beyond the Shore" (performed by Emilia Jones)	Nominated	
Hollywood Critics Association Film Awards	February 28, 2022	Spotlight Award	CODA	Won	
Hollywood Music in Media Awards	November 17, 2021	Original Score – Independent Film	Marius de Vries	Nominated	
Hollywood Music in Media Awards	November 17, 2021	Original Song – Independent Film	"Beyond the Shore" by Nick Baxter, Siân Heder, Marius de Vries, and Matt Dahan	Won	
Hollywood Music in Media Awards	November 17, 2021	Original Song – Onscreen Performance	Emilia Jones (for the song "Both Sides, Now")	Won	
Hollywood Music in Media Awards	November 17, 2021	Music Supervision – Film	Alexandra Patsavas	Nominated	
Hollywood Music in Media Awards	November 17, 2021	Soundtrack Album	CODA (Soundtrack from the Apple Original Film)	Nominated	
Houston Film Critics Society	January 19, 2022	Best Picture	CODA	Nominated	
Houston Film Critics Society	January 19, 2022	Best Actress	Emilia Jones	Nominated	
Houston Film Critics Society	January 19, 2022	Best Supporting Actor	Troy Kotsur	Nominated	
Houston Film Critics Society	January 19, 2022	Best Ensemble Cast	Eugenio Derbez, Daniel Durant, Emilia Jones, Troy Kotsur, Marlee Matlin, and Ferdia Walsh-Peelo	Nominated	
Houston Film Critics Society	January 19, 2022	Best Screenplay	Siân Heder	Nominated	
Independent Spirit Awards	March 6, 2022	Best Supporting Male	Troy Kotsur	Won	
Japan Academy Film Prize	March 10, 2023	Outstanding Foreign Language Film	CODA	Nominated	
Location Managers Guild Awards	August 27, 2022	Outstanding Locations in a Contemporary Film	CODA	Nominated	
London Film Critics' Circle	February 6, 2022	Young British/Irish Performer of the Year	Emilia Jones	Nominated	
Miskolc International Film Festival	September 18, 2021	Best Feature Film	CODA	Nominated	
NAACP Image Awards	February 26, 2022	Outstanding Independent Motion Picture	CODA	Won	
National Board of Review	December 2, 2021	Top Ten Independent Films	CODA	Won	
Norwegian International Film Festival	August 27, 2021	Ray of Sunshine Award	Siân Heder	Won	
Online Film Critics Society	January 24, 2022	Best Supporting Actor	Troy Kotsur	Nominated	
Palm Springs International Film Festival	February 26, 2021	Variety's 10 Directors to Watch & Creative Impact Awards	Siân Heder	Won	
Producers Guild of America Awards	March 19, 2022	Outstanding Producer of Theatrical Motion Pictures	Fabrice Gianfermi, Philippe Rousselet, and Patrick Wachsberger	Won	
San Diego Film Critics Society	January 10, 2022	Best Film	CODA	Nominated	
San Diego Film Critics Society	January 10, 2022	Best Actress	Emilia Jones	Nominated	
San Diego Film Critics Society	January 10, 2022	Best Supporting Actor	Troy Kotsur	Nominated	
San Diego Film Critics Society	January 10, 2022	Best Adapted Screenplay	Siân Heder	Nominated	
San Diego Film Critics Society	January 10, 2022	Breakthrough Artist	Emilia Jones	Won	
San Francisco Bay Area Film Critics Circle	January 10, 2022	Best Supporting Actor	Troy Kotsur	Nominated	
San Francisco Bay Area Film Critics Circle	January 10, 2022	Best Supporting Actress	Marlee Matlin	Nominated	
Santa Barbara International Film Festival	March 5, 2022	Virtuosos Award	Troy Kotsur	Won	
Santa Barbara International Film Festival	March 5, 2022	Virtuosos Award	Emilia Jones	Won	
Satellite Awards	April 2, 2022	Best Film, Drama	Siân Heder	Nominated	
Satellite Awards	April 2, 2022	Best Supporting Actress, Motion Picture	Marlee Matlin	Nominated	
Satellite Awards	April 2, 2022	Best Adapted Screenplay	Siân Heder	Won	
Satellite Awards	April 2, 2022	Best Original Song	"Beyond the Shore" by Nick Baxter, Siân Heder, Marius de Vries, and Matt Dahan	Nominated	
Screen Actors Guild Awards	February 27, 2022	Outstanding Performance by a Cast in a Motion Picture	Eugenio Derbez, Daniel Durant, Emilia Jones, Troy Kotsur, Marlee Matlin, Ferdia Walsh-Peelo	Won	
Screen Actors Guild Awards	February 27, 2022	Outstanding Performance by a Male Actor in a Supporting Role	Troy Kotsur	Won	
Seattle Film Critics Society	January 17, 2022	Best Picture of the Year	CODA	Nominated	
Seattle Film Critics Society	January 17, 2022	Best Actor in a Supporting Role	Troy Kotsur	Nominated	
Seattle Film Critics Society	January 17, 2022	Best Youth Performance	Emilia Jones	Won	
Set Decorators Society of America Awards	February 22, 2022	Best Achievement in Decor/Design of a Contemporary Feature Film	Vanessa Knoll and Diane Lederman	Nominated	
St. Louis Film Critics Association	December 19, 2021	Best Adapted Screenplay	Siân Heder	Nominated	
Sundance Film Festival	January 28, 2021	Best Director — U.S. Dramatic	Siân Heder	Won	
Sundance Film Festival	January 28, 2021	Audience Award — U.S. Dramatic	CODA	Won	
Sundance Film Festival	January 28, 2021	Grand Jury Prize — U.S. Dramatic	CODA	Won	
Sundance Film Festival	January 28, 2021	Special Jury Prize for Ensemble Cast — U.S. Dramatic	CODA	Won	
Vancouver Film Critics Circle	March 7, 2022	Best Film	CODA	Nominated	
Vancouver Film Critics Circle	March 7, 2022	Best Supporting Actor	Troy Kotsur	Won	
Washington D. C. Area Film Critics Association	December 6, 2021	Best Supporting Actor	Troy Kotsur	Nominated	
Washington D. C. Area Film Critics Association	December 6, 2021	Best Adapted Screenplay	Siân Heder	Nominated	
Washington D. C. Area Film Critics Association	December 6, 2021	Best Youth Performance	Emilia Jones	Nominated	
Women Film Critics Circle Awards	December 11, 2021	Best Movie About Women	CODA	Nominated	
Women Film Critics Circle Awards	December 11, 2021	Best Movie by a Woman	Siân Heder	Runner-up	
Women Film Critics Circle Awards	December 11, 2021	Best Woman Storyteller (Screenwriting Award)	Siân Heder	Nominated	
Women Film Critics Circle Awards	December 11, 2021	Best Screen Couple	Marlee Matlin and Troy Kotsur	Runner-up (Note: Tied with Nicole Kidman and Javier Bardem for Being the Ricardos)	
Women Film Critics Circle Awards	December 11, 2021	Courage in Filmmaking	Siân Heder	Nominated	
Writers Guild of America Awards	March 20, 2022	Best Adapted Screenplay	Siân Heder	Won	

== See also ==
- 2021 in film
