= Victoria Bedos =

French writer

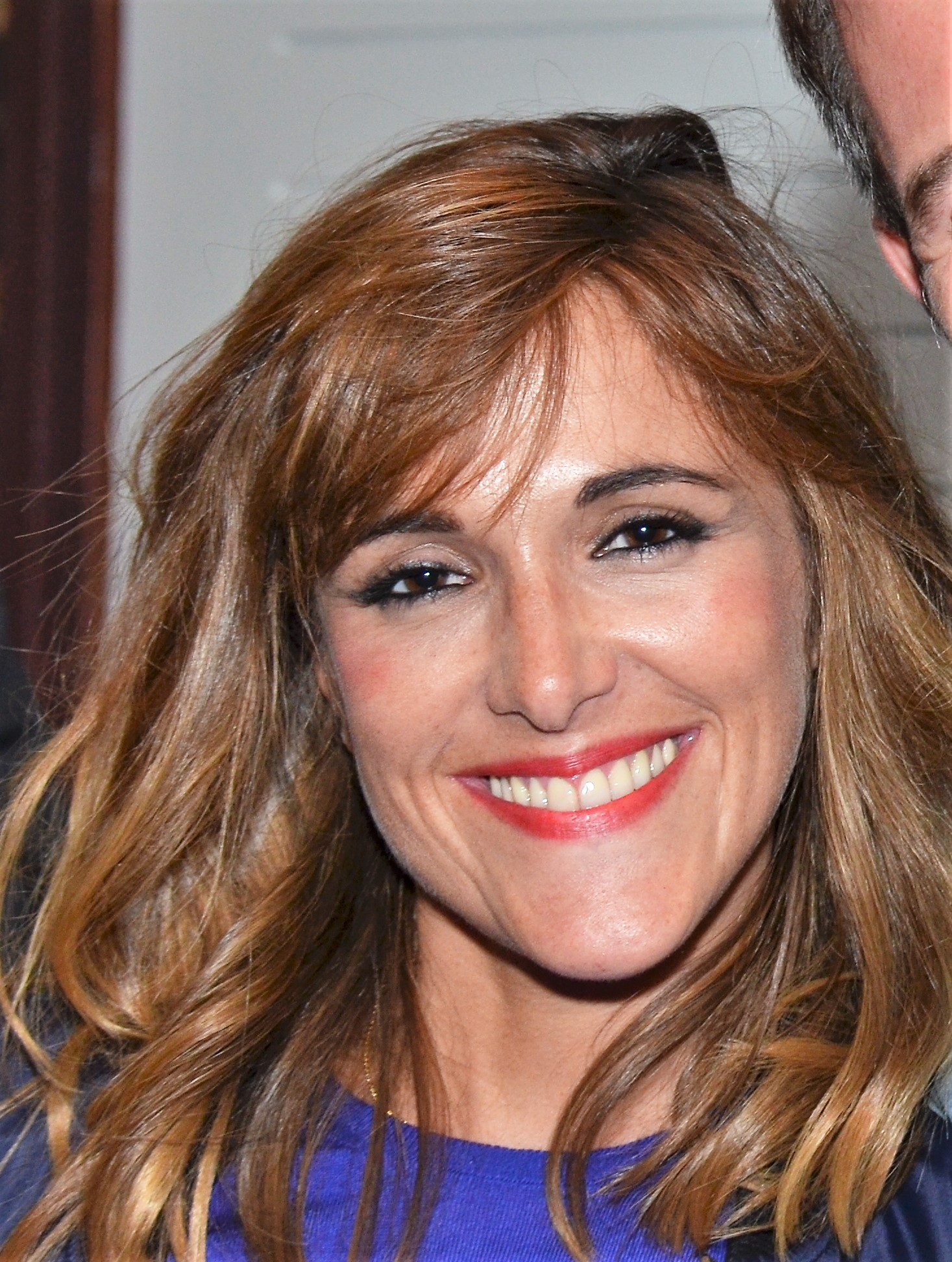
Victoria Bedos in 2016

Victoria Bedos (born April 28, 1984, in Neuilly-sur-Seine) is a French author, screenplay writer, singer and actress.

== Biography ==
=== Family ===
She is the daughter of Guy Bedos and Joëlle Bercot, and the sister of Nicolas Bedos. She was named after Chaplin's daughter.

=== Formation ===
Bedos began her career as a journalist on Télécinéobs (a supplement to Nouvel Observateur), on Inrockuptibles, and for the woman's magazine Glamour. At the age of 23, Plon published her first book, Le Déni, where she explored the lies involved in romance. She was also a screenwriter for Confidences, broadcast on Canal+ in January 2007.

=== Career ===
She was co-author with Stanislas Carré de Malberg of the screenplay for the film La Famille Bélier. The film was produced by Éric Jehelmann, Philippe Rousselet and Stéphane Célérié, directed by Éric Lartigau. In 2014, while writing La Famille Bélier, she set up the duo Vicky Banjo with Olivier Urvoy de Closmadeuc. They write songs and sing together. She played Linda, the lead role in the mini-series Gym Couine written and directed by Sébastien Haddouk, and broadcast for two years on June via social networks and produced by Silex films. She is the face of the interactive advertising campaign for the new version of the magazine Glamour, directed by Noémie Saglio. In January 2015, she made the film Vicky Banjo (provisional title) which she co-wrote with Denis Imbert (co-director of the series Platane) in which she played the leading role. It was directed by Denis Imbert and produced by LGM films with Chantal Lauby and François Berléand playing her parents and Jonathan Cohen as her brother.

In 2021, La Famille Bélier was adapted in English and directed by Sian Heder: CODA, with Emilia Jones and Eugenio Derbez.

== Bibliography ==
- Le déni, Plon, 2007

== Filmographie ==
- 2014 : La Famille Bélier par Éric Lartigau, scénario et histoire originale.
- 2015 : Vicky Banjo par Denis Imbert, scénario et acteur.
- 2023 : La plus belle pour aller danser par herself, scénario

== Nominations ==
- César 2015 : for Best original screenplay for La Famille Bélier
