= CODA (soundtrack) =

2021 film soundtrack album

CODA (Soundtrack from the Apple Original Film)

Soundtrack album by Various artists
- Released: August 13, 2021
- Genre: Feature film soundtrack
- Length: 45:03
- Label: Republic Records
- Producer: Nicholai Baxter; Marius de Vries

CODA (Soundtrack from the Apple Original Film) is the soundtrack album to the 2021 film CODA. The album featuring 18-tracks was released by Republic Records on August 13, 2021, the same day coinciding with the theatrical and streaming release on Apple TV+. It features original songs composed by Marius de Vries, co-produced the tracks with Nicholas Baxter, and incorporated tracks were compiled into the album. The film's lead cast members, Emilia Jones and Ferdia Walsh-Peelo, had sung for most of the tracks in the film, along with CODA choir members (students from the Berklee College of Music) recording for a few tracks.

== Background ==
"It didn't really prepare us for the experience of seeing the early footage cut together for the first time and seeing these long scenes of emotional intensity and full of dialogue, but without words. What became immediately apparent is that those scenes, in spite of the lack of spoken language, are not silent. They're really a rich detail of mouth noises, body percussion, supported movements, and that had a tonality all of its own, delicate, but definitely powerful. That really helped us to understand what the relationship of music and silence meant within the specific context of this movie."

— Marius de Vries

Vries attached to the project in mid-2019, when Patrick Wachsberger had the acquisition for the remake rights of La Famille Bélier (2014) and co-produced the film with the original film's producer Philippe Rousselet. During the scripting discussions, he felt that composing original songs for a film, that featured predominantly deaf characters, is considered to be the "biggest challenge" as there need a strong musical cue to connect the emotions, for each sign language. In an interview with Edward Douglas, Vries recalled that "We pretty quickly realized that the dramatic side of the movie would start, in musical terms, in almost complete silence, and then the score would sort of surreptitiously bleed into it as her [Emilia Jones] journey into music develops. The more fully-fledged cues that you hear at the end of the film correspond with the slow process of her mastering her craft as a singer and confidence as a musical intelligence." The soundtrack album was curated and produced by Vries and Nicholai Baxter. Baxter stated that "I've always been drawn to soundtrack albums that take the listeners on the journey of reliving the movie, even if it's from a completely different perspective [...] Especially for a film like this, it's rewarding to be able to experience that again, in audio form."

Sian Heder believed that there is a strong connection between deaf culture and music. She further elaborated this in an interview with Roy Takin of Variety magazine, saying "ASL, as a language, is closer to music than spoken word — it is expressive, melodic, rhythmic, visual and three-dimensional in the same way music is. You use your whole body, and experience what you say as you're saying it. You live in those emotions being described as you communicate [...] The ASL scenes, even though not accompanied by music, are far from silent. They are full of incredible, intimate sounds of breath, vocalization, the way fingers hit against clothes or hands slap together in anger. It would have been very easy for the music to overwhelm what was happening on screen." The team wanted the audience to intentionally experience of the silence and being comfortable, and once the audience were invested and emotionally drawn with the characters, they felt that it is acceptable to score music.

== Recording and production ==
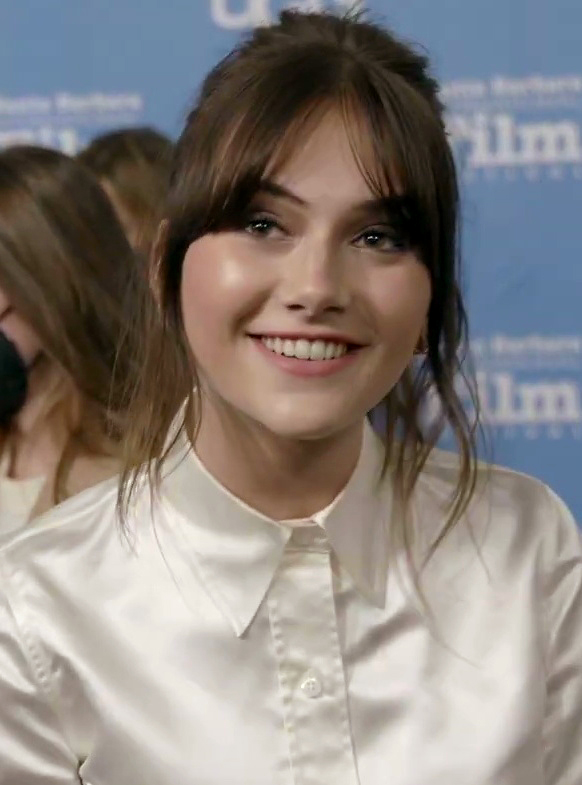
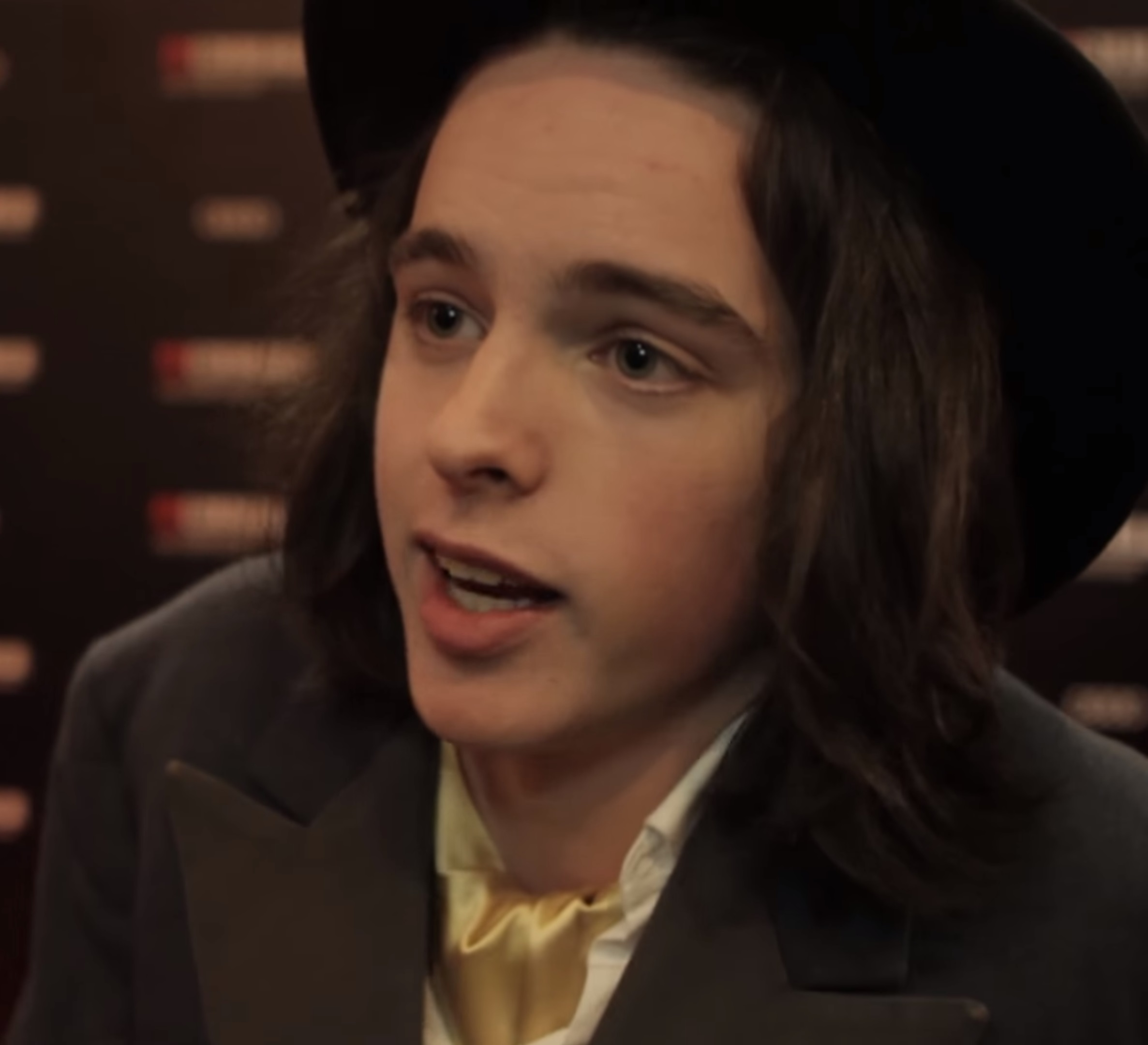
Emilia Jones (left), the film's lead actress had sung most of the incorporated tracks and the original song "Beyond the Shore". She sang for four tracks with Ferdia Walsh-Peelo (right) and the CODA choir.

Vries approached for minimal instrumentation, to connect with the deaf characters' emotions. Some of the musical sequences, including Emilia's high-school choir performance and rehearsals where shot and recorded live on sets, instead of re-recording and lip-syncing. Some of the students trained at Berklee College of Music and Gloucester High School, were brought in for the choir sequences, under the suggestions of Vries and Baxter, the latter also worked with the students in Berklee. All the songs in the album were recorded live. When the songs recording were done, the team originally had to mix the album in Canada, but post-production works were interrupted due to the COVID-19 pandemic lockdown. The team later relocated to Los Angeles, to continue the mixing and mastering works, and the team managed to complete post-production, as most of the restrictions were lifted due to the reduction in COVID-19 cases, though the team had to abide safety guidelines. Emilia's vocals were recorded at a studio in England.

While most of the album featured incorporated musical songs, an original track sung by Emilia Jones and written by Heder and Matt Dahan, titled "Beyond the Shore" was composed for the film. The song, which was the final track from the album, was recorded when most of the filming and production works were completed. Heder said that "When we started thinking about the song, the movie felt complete, in a way. Yet it ended with a beginning — [Ruby] driving off into the unknown of whatever her journey was going to be [...] Even though we go forth from our families and out into the world and pursue our own dreams, they're always going to be a part of us." Baxter also recalled in an interview with The Hollywood Reporter, saying "All of us realized that it would be really powerful if we could extend Ruby's narrative a little bit further. You end the film feeling somewhat unresolved and wondering what happens to her and wanting more from her story."

== Reception ==
Reviewing for The Hollywood Reporter, at the screening in 2021 Sundance Film Festival, Jon Frosch said "Marius De Vries' score is discreet and sparingly deployed, never overshadowing the singing by Ruby, Miles and the choir. And if a movie is going to feature multiple rehearsal scenes, Marvin Gaye and Tammi Terrell's "You're All I Need to Get By" and Joni Mitchell's "Both Sides Now" are pretty unbeatable song choices." Divya Bhavani of The Hindu stated "Though music is a strong component in this film, it rightfully remains as such and does not overshadow the core storytelling. The emotive score of strings by Marius de Vries has a subtle restraint that is slowly lessened as Ruby comes into her own; the compositions make for an ideal companion to the visual narrative."

== Track listing ==
CODA (Soundtrack from the Apple Original Film)
No.	Title	Writer(s)	Performer(s)	Length
1.	"Something's Got a Hold on Me"	Leroy Kirkland; Pearl Woods	Etta James	2:49
2.	"One Thing I Know How To Do"		Marius de Vries	2:16
3.	"It's Your Thing"	Bernard Rudolph Isley; Kelly O Isley; Ronald Isley	Emilia Jones; Ferdia Walsh-Peelo; CODA Choir	2:00
4.	"You're All I Need to Get By"	Nickolas Ashford; Valerie Simpson	Marvin Gaye; Tammi Terrell	2:49
5.	"I Fought the Law"	Sonny Curtis	The Clash	2:41
6.	"Mr. V's Sonata"		de Vries	1:00
7.	"The Observer"		de Vries	1:02
8.	"Walk in the Woods / Belly Flop"		de Vries	2:01
9.	"The Log"		de Vries	1:20
10.	"Do You Ever Wish I Was Deaf?"		de Vries	1:12
11.	"I've Got the Music in Me"	Tobias Boshell	Jones; Walsh-Peelo; CODA Choir	3:09
12.	"Starman"	David Bowie	Jones; Walsh-Peelo; CODA Choir	3:27
13.	"You're All I Need to Get By" (Duet)	Ashford; Simpson	Jones; Walsh-Peelo; CODA Choir	2:25
14.	"Going To Boston"		de Vries	2:14
15.	"Both Sides, Now"	Joni Mitchell	Jones	4:39
16.	"Wait Wait Stop Stop"		de Vries	3:36
17.	"Beyond The Shore"	de Vries; Matt Dahan; Sian Heder; Nicholai Baxter	Jones	4:07
18.	"Ruby's Theme"		de Vries	2:08
Total length:				45:03

== Charts ==
Chart (2021)	Peak position
UK Compilation Albums (OCC)	34
UK Digital Albums (OCC)	23
UK Soundtrack Albums (OCC)	28
US Billboard 200	49
US Soundtrack Albums (Billboard)	14

== Accolades ==
Although the film was nominated and won, three Oscars at the 94th Academy Awards (Best Picture, Best Supporting Actor for Troy Kotsur, and Best Adapted Screenplay), the track "Beyond the Shore" was shortlisted for Best Original Song, but did not make it to the final list of nominations.

Award	Date of ceremony	Category	Recipient(s)	Result	Ref.
Hollywood Music in Media Awards	November 17, 2021	Original Score – Independent Film	Marius de Vries	Nominated	
Hollywood Music in Media Awards	November 17, 2021	Original Song – Independent Film	Nick Baxter, Siân Heder, Marius de Vries, and Matt Dahan (for the song "Beyond the Shore")	Won	
Hollywood Music in Media Awards	November 17, 2021	Original Song – Onscreen Performance	Emilia Jones (for the song "Both Sides, Now")	Won	
Hollywood Music in Media Awards	November 17, 2021	Music Supervision – Film	Alexandra Patsavas	Nominated	
Hollywood Music in Media Awards	November 17, 2021	Soundtrack Album	CODA (Soundtrack from the Apple Original Film)	Nominated	
Hollywood Critics Association Film Awards	February 28, 2022	Best Original Song	"Beyond the Shore" (performed by Emilia Jones)	Nominated	
Guild of Music Supervisors Awards	March 20, 2022	Best Music Supervision for Films Budgeted Under $25 Million	Alexandra Patsavas	Nominated	
Guild of Music Supervisors Awards	March 20, 2022	Best Song Written and/or Recorded for a Film	"Beyond the Shore"	Nominated	
Guild of Music Supervisors Awards	March 20, 2022	Best Music Supervision in a Trailer	Will Quiney	Nominated	
Satellite Awards	April 2, 2022	Best Original Song	Nick Baxter, Siân Heder, Marius de Vries, and Matt Dahan (for the song "Beyond the Shore")	Nominated	
