= Rob Doyle (writer) =

Irish novelist and literary critic

Rob Doyle is an Irish author. He has published three novels, a collection of short stories and a book of non-fiction, and he is the editor of two anthologies.

His 2014 novel Here Are the Young Men was adapted into a 2020 film of the same name. His writing has appeared in The New York Times, The Observer, The Dublin Review, and many other publications.

== Early life ==
Doyle was born in Dublin, where his father and mother worked in the post office until their retirement. He studied Philosophy and Psychoanalytic Studies at Trinity College Dublin. After completing his education, Doyle left Ireland to travel and live abroad for a number of years, with periods in Southeast Asia, South America, London, San Francisco and Sicily. Throughout his twenties he made a living as an English language teacher and philosophy tutor. After quitting his teaching work to devote himself full-time to writing, he lived for periods in Paris, Berlin, Dublin, and Rosslare Harbour, County Wexford.

== Career ==
Doyle wrote his first novel, Here Are the Young Men, while living in London. It was published in 2014 by Lilliput Press and Bloomsbury. It was shortlisted for the Newcomer of the Year at the Irish Book Awards, and was included in Hot Press magazine’s "20 Greatest Irish Novels 1916–2016". A film adaptation directed by Eoin Macken and starring Dean-Charles Chapman, Anya Taylor-Joy, Finn Cole and Ferdia Walsh-Peelo was released in 2020. This Is the Ritual, a collection of short fiction, was published in 2016 by Bloomsbury and Lilliput Press, and was a book of the year in the New Statesman and Sunday Times. Threshold, a work which contains elements of memoir, fiction, and travel-writing, was published by Bloomsbury in 2020. It was described in the TLS as ‘Riddling, irreverent, fearless… His best book so far’, by The New York Times as ‘game and gleefully provocative’, and by Ryan Chapman in Inside Hook as ‘the great drug novel of our time’. Threshold was shortlisted for the Kerry Group Irish Novel of the Year Award 2021. In 2021 Doyle’s first nonfiction book Autobibliography was published by Swift Press. The book evolved from a weekly column Doyle wrote in The Irish Times throughout 2019 on rereading 52 of the books that had influenced him.

Doyle edited the anthologies The Other Irish Tradition (2017, Dalkey Archive Press) and In This Skull Hotel Where I Never Sleep (2018, Broken Dimanche Press). Doyle played the lead role – "the Hitcher" – in the feature film Hit the North, directed by Daniel Sayer.

== Books ==
- — (2014). Here Are the Young Men. Bloomsbury / Lilliput Press.
- — (2016). This Is the Ritual. Bloomsbury / Lilliput Press.
- — (2020). Threshold. Bloomsbury.
- — (2021). Autobibliography. Swift Press.
- — (2026). Cameo. Weidenfeld & Nicolson.
