= Rob Doyle =

Rob Doyle may refer to:

- Rob Doyle (ice hockey)
- Rob Doyle (writer)
