= Jason Durr =

British actor (born 1967)

- Born: 2 December 1967 (age 58); Singapore
- Occupation: Actor
- Years active: 1990–present
- Television: Jupiter Moon; Heartbeat; Casualty
- Spouse: Kate Charman (m. 2004)
- Children: 3

Jason Durr (born 2 December 1967) is an English/Irish actor. Durr made his television debut as Alex Hartman in the sci-fi drama Jupiter Moon in 1990 and went on to star as Mike Bradley in the Yorkshire-based police drama series Heartbeat from 1997 until 2003. Between 2016 and 2023, he appeared in the medical drama series Casualty as David Hide.

== Early life ==
Durr was born on 2 December 1967 in Singapore. After leaving Leighton Park School, Durr trained at the London Academy of Music and Dramatic Art.

== Career ==
In his early career Durr worked with the Royal Shakespeare Company under director Trevor Nunn. From 1997 to 2003, he starred as Mike Bradley in the Yorkshire-based police drama series Heartbeat. In 2009, he appeared in a two-part British television drama, Above Suspicion. He received favourable reviews for his performance as murder suspect Alan Daniels.

In 2012, Durr starred as Guy Littleton in Noël Coward's Volcano, opposite Jenny Seagrove at the Vaudeville Theatre in London's West End. In February 2014, Durr starred in the Michael Frayn production of Donkeys Years at the Rose Theatre in Kingston. Then in March 2014, he appeared in The Mummy opposite Susie Amy at the Belgrade Theatre and then on a national tour. In 2016, he joined the cast of the BBC medical drama series Casualty as Clinical Nurse Manager David Hide. In October 2022, Durr announced he was leaving Casualty after six years. Durr starred as Colonel Mustard in the play Cluedo 2 in spring 2024. 2025 saw Jason play Jimmy Vale in Channel 4’s drama, Pierre to be aired late ‘26. After starring in Torben Betts new play ‘Murder At Midnight’ on tour throughout 2025 into spring ‘26, Jason has joined the cast of Eastenders, as ‘Clive Masters’ with his first episodes in July 2026.

== Personal life ==
Durr has three children with his wife, television presenter and garden designer Kate Charman, whom he married in 2004.

== Filmography ==
Film roles
Year	Title	Role	Genre
1991	Young Soul Rebels	Billibud/ Lead Role	Punk drama
1996	La lengua asesina	Johnny	Sci-fi horror
2006	True True Lie	Dr. Anthony/ Lead Role	Thriller
2013	Down Dog	Frank/ Lead Role	British comedy
2014	Bloodshot	Andrew	

Television roles
Year	Title	Role	Notes
1990	Jupiter Moon	Alex Hartman	Lead role
1990	Iphigeneia at Aulis	Potroculus	TV drama (play adaptation)
1990	The Paradise Club	Tony Bracciola	1 episode
1991	Sir Gawain and the Green Knight	Sir Gawain	
1993	Femme Fatale	Davey Harty	TV series
1993	Inspector Morse	John Brewster	Episode: "Deadly Slumber"
1994	A Dark-Adapted Eye	Jamie	TV film
1995	Sharpe's Battle	Lord Kiely	1 episode
1996	Christmas	Martin	Television film
1997	Bugs	Mark	Episode: "Happy Ever After"
1997–2003	Heartbeat	Mike Bradley	Lead role
2000	The Wrong Side of the Rainbow	Nick	Lead role
2003	Winter Solstice	Sam Howard	Lead role
2004	Fooling Hitler	Lt. Col. Strangeways	Lead role
2005	Mysterious Island	Pencroff	Lead role
2005	Summer Solstice	Sam Howard	Lead role
2007	Numb3rs	J.W. Piennar	Episode: "Robin Hood"
2009	Above Suspicion	Alan Daniels	Lead role
2010	Agatha Christie's Marple	Eddie Seward	Episode: "The Blue Geranium"
2012	Lewis	DI Peterson	Episodes: "Generation of Vipers" and "The Indelible Stain"
2011	Midsomer Murders	Luke Archbold	Episode: "Fit for Murder"
2013	New Tricks	Eddie Trenton	Episode: "Things Can Only Get Better"
2016–2023	Casualty	David Hide	Series regular
2019–2020	Holby City	David Hide	Guest appearances
2025	Shakespeare & Hathaway: Private Investigators	Charlie Alexander	Episode: "Such Sweet Sorrow"
2026	EastEnders	Clive Masters	
2026	Pierre	Jimmy Vale	
