= Here Are the Young Men =

2020 film

- Official poster
- Directed by: Eoin Macken
- Written by: Eoin Macken
- Based on: Here Are the Young Men by Rob Doyle
- Produced by: Richard Bolger; Noah C. Haeussner
- Starring: Dean-Charles Chapman; Finn Cole; Anya Taylor-Joy; Ferdia Walsh-Peelo; Travis Fimmel; Conleth Hill
- Cinematography: James Mather
- Edited by: Colin Campbell
- Music by: Ryan Potesta
- Production companies: Hail Mary Pictures; Union Entertainment Group; Screen Ireland; Foton Pictures; Funny Leopard Films; Glanzrock Productions
- Distributed by: Well Go USA Entertainment; Signature Entertainment
- Release dates: 11 July 2020 (Galway Film Fleadh); 27 April 2021 (United States); 30 April 2021 (United Kingdom)
- Running time: 96 minutes
- Countries: United States; Ireland
- Language: English

Here Are the Young Men is a 2020 drama film written and directed by Eoin Macken, based on the novel of the same name by Irish writer Rob Doyle. It stars Dean-Charles Chapman, Finn Cole, Anya Taylor-Joy, Ferdia Walsh-Peelo, Travis Fimmel and Conleth Hill.

The film had its world premiere at the Galway Film Fleadh on 11 July 2020. It was released in the United States on 27 April 2021, by Well Go USA Entertainment, and in the United Kingdom on 30 April 2021, by Signature Entertainment.

== Plot ==
Matthew, Joseph and Rez are students, who on their last day of school vandalize their school and damage their principal's car. The three hang out with Jen and discuss their plans for the summer. Matthew will go to work, Joseph will go to the US, and Rez will stay in the area as well. While the three are walking they see a little girl get hit by a car and die, which profoundly shocks Matthew and Rez, but exhilarates Joseph. Matthew is in a relationship with Jen, but Jen does not want to hear about Matthew's problems. Joseph goes to America and becomes more reckless before returning to the UK before the end of the summer. Rez attempts suicide at the start of the summer and sours his relationship with Matthew. When Joseph returns the three are able to reunite. Matthew grows upset with Jen's indifference to his feelings, and the two seemingly break up. Matthew and Joseph go to a party where Jen is also present. Jen states she is okay with resuming the relationship with Matthew, but wants to drink for the night and approaches him later that night, but is rejected by Matthew who is still having problems due to having witnessed the girl's death. Joseph approaches Jen as she becomes inebriated and then attempts to rape her, but Jen rejects him angrily. The next day, Jen tells Matthew what happened. He doesn't believe her at first but then offers to exact revenge, which she rebuffs. Later, the three friends go to a club where Matthew drugs Joseph and, at the top of the club, he pushes Joseph, who dies. Matthew and Rez attend Joseph's funeral.

== Cast ==
- Dean-Charles Chapman as Matthew Connolly
- Finn Cole as Joseph Kearney
- Anya Taylor-Joy as Jen
- Ferdia Walsh-Peelo as Rez
- Conleth Hill as Mark Kearney
- Travis Fimmel as TV Presenter
- Emmett J. Scanlan as Homeless Man
- Chris Newman as Dwayne Kearney
- Ralph Ineson as Mr Landerton
- Susan Lynch as Lynn Connolly
- Lola Petticrew as Julie
- Noomi Rapace as Angel Dust
- Eoin Macken as Homeless American

== Production ==
In August 2018, it was announced Dean-Charles Chapman, Finn Cole, Anya Taylor-Joy, Ferdia Walsh-Peelo, Conleth Hill and Lola Petticrew joined the cast of the film, with Eoin Macken directing from a screenplay by Macken and Rob Doyle, based upon the novel of the same name, written by Doyle. Richard Bolger, Noah Haeussner, Edwina Casey served as producers on the film, while Paul W. S. Anderson, Andrew Davies Gans, Conor Barry and Michael Raimondi served as executive producers under their Hail Mary Pictures and Union Entertainment Group banners, respectively. In September 2018, Ralph Ineson and Susan Lynch joined the cast of the film. In November 2019, it was announced Travis Fimmel had joined the cast of the film. The title is a quote from the song "Decades" which closes the album Closer (1980) by Joy Division.

=== Filming ===
Principal photography began in August 2018 in Ireland.

== Release ==
The film had its world premiere at the Galway Film Fleadh on 11 July 2020. In November 2020, Well Go USA Entertainment and Signature Entertainment acquired Irish, UK and US distribution rights to the film respectively. It was released in the United States on 27 April 2021, and the United Kingdom on 30 April 2021.

== Reception ==
Here Are the Young Men holds a 38% approval rating on review aggregator website Rotten Tomatoes, based on 29 reviews, with an average of 5/10. The critics consensus reads "Strong acting and good intentions aren't enough to overcome all the obvious turns in Here Are the Young Men's derivative story." On Metacritic, the film holds a weighted average score of 49 out of 100 based on four reviews, indicating "mixed or average" reviews.
