= Dean-Charles Chapman =

English actor (born 1997)

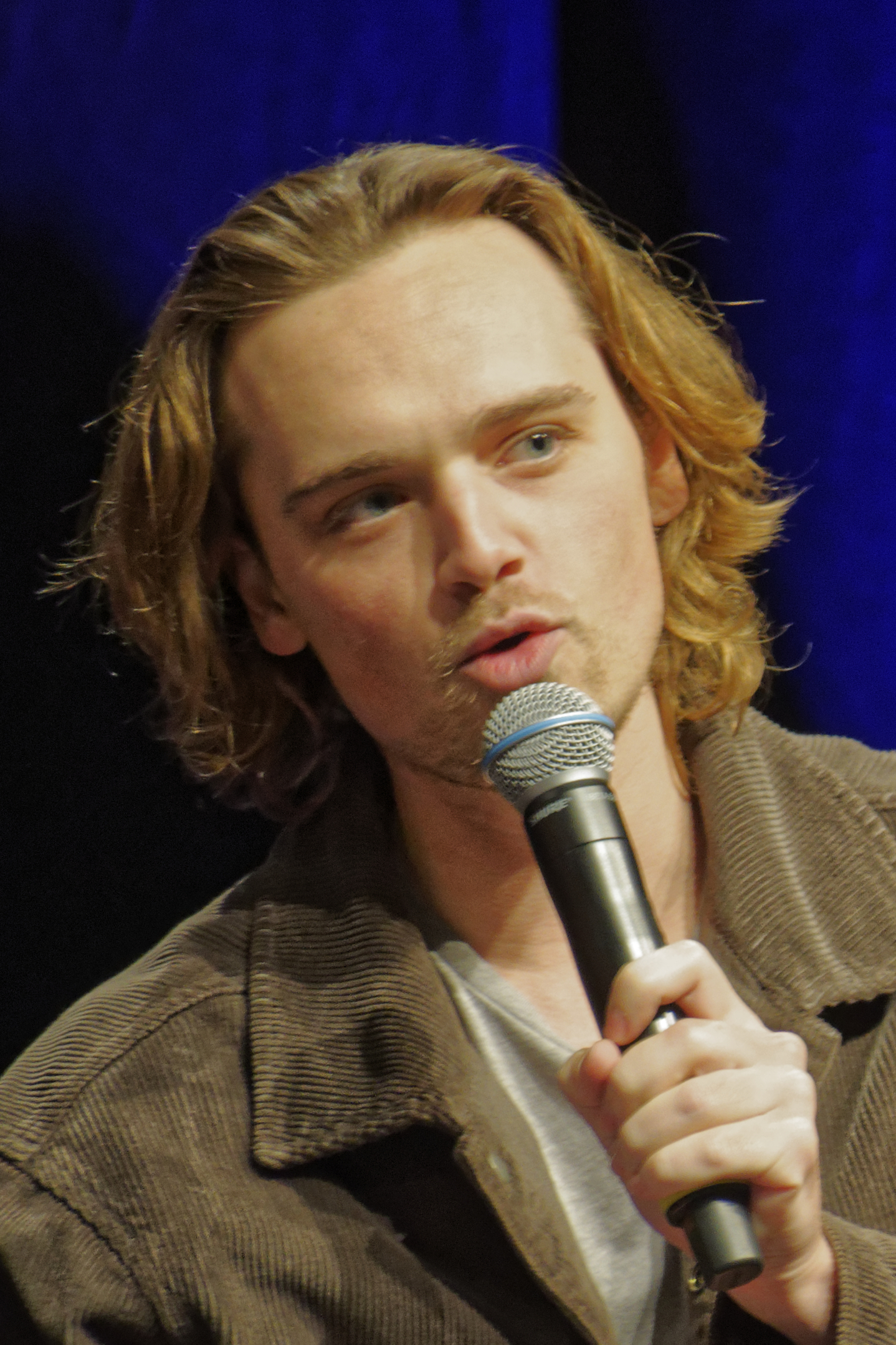
- Chapman in 2022
- Born: 7 September 1997 (age 29); Havering, London, England
- Occupation: Actor
- Years active: 2005–present

Dean-Charles Chapman (born 7 September 1997) is an English actor known for portraying Billy Elliot in the West End theatre production of Billy Elliot the Musical. His notable TV roles include Richard Grey in The White Queen (2013) and Tommen Baratheon in the HBO fantasy series Game of Thrones (2014–2016). He also portrayed Tom Blake in Sam Mendes's film 1917 (2019) and Thomas of Lancaster in David Michôd's The King (2019).

== Career ==
At the age of eight, Chapman was cast as "Small Boy" in Billy Elliot the Musical, and would later be promoted to the roles of Michael and finally the titular character, becoming the second-longest running cast member in the production. During his time on Billy Elliot, he worked alongside his friend and future Spider-Man actor Tom Holland, and had the opportunity to meet Prime Minister Gordon Brown with several other young actors in the play.

Soon after leaving Billy Elliot, Chapman was cast on the CBBC sitcom The Revolting World of Stanley Brown in the titular role, the series aired from September to December 2012. He made his film debut in the 2014 film Before I Go to Sleep, alongside Nicole Kidman and Colin Firth.

After playing the minor role of Martyn Lannister in the third season of Game of Thrones, he replaced Callum Wharry in the major role of Tommen Baratheon, the young king of Westeros for the fourth, fifth, and sixth seasons of the show. With the rest of the cast, he was nominated for a Screen Actors Guild Award. In 2018, he played the role of Castor in the AMC series Into the Badlands for seven episodes, followed by a supporting role in the film Blinded by the Light.

In 2018, he was cast in the lead role of Matthew in the Eoin Macken's drama Here Are the Young Men, based on the book of the same name, supported by Finn Cole, Anya Taylor-Joy, and Ferdia Walsh-Peelo. In 2019, he was cast, alongside George MacKay, as one of the two leads in the Sam Mendes-directed war film 1917. The film went on to receive ten Academy Award nominations, winning three.

== Personal life ==
Chapman is close friends with his Game of Thrones co-star Isaac Hempstead Wright (Bran Stark), whom he met through his involvement with the series.

Chapman's great-great grandfather, David Peers, was taken as a prisoner of war by the Germans in France during the First World War.

== Filmography ==
=== Film ===
Year	Title	Role	Notes
2014	Before I Go to Sleep	Adam Lucas	
2015	Man Up	Harry	
2017	Breathe	Jonathan Cavendish	
2018	The Commuter	Danny MacCauley	
2019	Blinded by the Light	Matt	
2019	The King	Thomas of Lancaster	
2019	1917	Lance corporal Thomas Blake	
2020	Here Are the Young Men	Matthew Connolly	
2022	Catherine Called Birdy	Robert	
2023	Ozi: Voice of the Forest	Chance (voice)	

=== Television ===
Year	Title	Role	Notes
2007	Casualty	William Mulhern	Episode: "A House Divided"
2012	Cuckoo	Charlie	Episode: "Family Meeting"
2012	The Revolting World of Stanley Brown	Stanley Brown	13 episodes
2013	The White Queen	Richard Grey	4 episodes
2013	Game of Thrones	Martyn Lannister	2 episodes
2014–2016	Game of Thrones	Tommen Baratheon	16 episodes
2014	Glue	Chris Pollard	2 episodes
2015	Ripper Street	Harry Ward	Episode: "Your Father. My Friend"
2015	Fungus the Bogeyman	Dean	3 episodes
2017	Will	Billy Cooper	3 episodes
2018	Into the Badlands	Castor	7 episodes
2022	The Walk-In	Jack Renshaw	5 episodes
2024	The Acolyte	Torbin	3 episodes
2025	Too Much	Gaz	6 episodes
2026	Pierre	Danny Headman	
TBA	The Portrait of a Lady †	Edward Rosier	Upcoming six-part series

=== Stage ===
Year	Title	Role	Notes
2005–2006	Billy Elliot the Musical	Small Boy	Chapman is the second longest-serving cast member of the production, and the longest-serving Billy Elliot
2008–2009	Billy Elliot the Musical	Michael	Chapman is the second longest-serving cast member of the production, and the longest-serving Billy Elliot
2009–2011	Billy Elliot the Musical	Billy Elliot	Chapman is the second longest-serving cast member of the production, and the longest-serving Billy Elliot

== Awards and nominations ==
Year	Award	Category	Nominated work	Result
2017	Screen Actors Guild Award	Outstanding Performance by an Ensemble in a Drama Series	Game of Thrones	Nominated
2020	CinEuphoria Awards	Merit – Honorary Award	Game of Thrones	Won
2020	CinEuphoria Awards	Best Ensemble – International Competition	The King	Nominated
2020	London Critics Circle Film Awards	Young British/Irish Performer of the Year	1917, The King, and Blinded by the Light	Nominated
