= Love Gets a Room =

2021 musical drama film

- Directed by: Rodrigo Cortés
- Written by: David Safier; Rodrigo Cortés
- Produced by: Adrián Guerra; Núria Valls
- Starring: Clara Rugaard; Ferdia Walsh-Peelo; Mark Ryder; Valentina Bellè; Jack Roth; Freya Parks; Anastasia Hille; Magnus Krepper; Henry Goodman; Dalit Streett Tejeda
- Edited by: Rodrigo Cortés
- Music by: Victor Reyes
- Production companies: Nostromo Pictures; Love Gets a Room AIE
- Distributed by: A Contracorriente Films (es)
- Release dates: November 2021 (SEFF); 3 December 2021 (Spain)
- Countries: Spain; United Kingdom
- Language: English

Love Gets a Room (Spanish: El amor en su lugar) is a 2021 musical drama film directed by Rodrigo Cortés. Set in the Warsaw Ghetto, it stars Clara Rugaard and Ferdia Walsh-Peelo.

== Plot ==
Set in the Warsaw Getto during World War II, the fiction focuses on a group of Jewish thespians performing a musical stage play.

== Cast ==
- Clara Rugaard as Stefcia
- Ferdia Walsh-Peelo as Edmund
- Mark Ryder as Patryk
- Valentina Belle as Ada
- Jack Roth as Jozek
- Freya Parks as Niusia
- Anastasia Hille as Irena
- Magnus Krepper as Sergeant Szkop
- Henry Goodman as Zylberman
- Dalit Streett Tejeda as Sarah

== Production ==
The screenplay was penned by David Safier and Rodrigo Cortés. Nostromo Pictures' Adrián Guerra and Núria Valls were credited as producers. The film was produced by Nostromo Pictures alongside Love Gets a Room AIE with the collaboration of the Department of Culture of the Generalitat of Catalonia and the participation of TVC and Crea SGR.

== Release ==
The film made its world premiere at the 18th Seville European Film Festival (SEFF) in November 2021. Distributed by A Contracorriente Films, Love Gets a Room was theatrically released in Spain on 3 December 2021. Lionsgate handles the international sales.

== Reception ==
Reviewing for Fotogramas, Blai Morell gave the film 4 out of 5 stars, highlighting the "virtuosity" of its mise-en-scène and the musical compositions by Víctor Reyes, while noting that there was some performer who was not up to the task.

Raquel Hernández Luján of HobbyConsolas gave the film 80 out of 100 points, deeming it to be a cinema masterclass by Cortés, "thrilling and captivating" in terms of both the mise-en-scène and its honesty, praising the production design and the actors' direction, while noting that there were some repetitive moments and some over-abuse of the musical score.

Oti Rodríguez Marchante of ABC gave it a positive review with a rating of 4 out of 5 stars.

Reviewing for El Periódico de Catalunya, Beatriz Martínez rated the film with 4 out of 5 stars, considering that, in this film, Cortés' virtuosity was put at the service of something more than a mere stylistic exercise.

Jonathan Holland of ScreenDaily considered the result of the juxtaposition of a musical comedy stage performance and the desperate offstage lives of the fictional cast to be "a fine technical achievement, a moving enquiry into what young love can mean under such conditions, and Cortés' strongest film since 2010's Buried", also deeming it to be, from a technical point of view, "a tour-de-force in several ways".

== Awards and nominations ==
Year	Award	Category	Nominee(s)	Result	Ref.
2022	9th Feroz Awards	Best Director	Rodrigo Cortés	Won	
2022	9th Feroz Awards	Best Screenplay	David Safier, Rodrigo Cortés	Nominated	
2022	9th Feroz Awards	Best Original Score	Víctor Reyes	Nominated	
2022	77th CEC Medals	Best Film		Won	
2022	77th CEC Medals	Best Director	Rodrigo Cortés	Won	
2022	77th CEC Medals	Best Actress	Clara Rugaard	Nominated	
2022	77th CEC Medals	Best Original Screenplay	Rodrigo Cortés, David Safier	Won	
2022	77th CEC Medals	Best Cinematography	Rafael García	Won	
2022	77th CEC Medals	Best Editing	Rodrigo Cortés	Won	
2022	77th CEC Medals	Best Score	Víctor Reyes	Won	
2022	36th Goya Awards	Best Costume Design	Alberto Valcárcel	Nominated	
2022	36th Goya Awards	Best Production Supervision	Óscar Vigiola	Nominated	
2022	14th Gaudí Awards	Best Art Direction	Laia Colet	Nominated	
2022	14th Gaudí Awards	Best Costume Design	Alberto Valcárcel	Nominated	
2022	66th Sant Jordi Awards	Best Spanish Film		Won	

== See also ==
- List of Spanish films of 2021
- List of British films of 2021
