= Pierre (TV series) =

British television series

- Screenplay by: John Donnelly; Roy Williams
- Directed by: Sarmad Masud
- Starring: David Harewood
- Country of origin: United Kingdom
- Original language: English
- No. of series: 1
- No. of episodes: 6

Production
- Executive producer: David Harewood
- Production company: The Lighthouse

Original release
- Network: Channel 4
- Release: 5 October – 9 November 2026

Pierre is a British television series for Channel 4, co-written by John Donnelly and playwright Roy Williams, in his television series debut, and starring David Harewood. It premiered on 5 October 2026.

== Premise ==
A London solicitor investigates institutional corruption following the death of a young black man.

== Cast ==
- David Harewood as Pierre
- Michele Austin as Charlotte Manners
- Jason Flemyng as DS Ronnie Miller
- Dean-Charles Chapman as Danny Headman
- Nikkita Chadha as Alecia Khan
- Christopher Fairbank as Sean Lambert
- Sara Powell as Celeste Jeffreys
- Cherrelle Skeete as Brenda
- Dylan Ennis as Eli Jeffreys
- Ezrae Maye as Michael
- Jason Durr as Jimmy Vale
- Tom Rhys Harries as Mark Tanner
- Amrita Acharia as DCI Craig

== Production ==
The series is co-written by John Donnelly and playwright Roy Wiliams, in his television series debut. It is produced by The Lighthouse. It was announced as an upcoming series for Channel 4 in February 2025.

David Harewood is an executive producer and leads the cast. Michele Austin and Jason Flemyng are also part of the lead cast as well as Dean-Charles Chapman, Jason Durr, Nikkita Chadha, Christopher Fairbank, Sara Powell, Cherrelle Skeete, Dylan Ennis and Ezrae Maye.

Filming began in West London in June 2025.

== Broadcast ==
It aired in the United Kingdom on Channel 4 on 5 October 2026, with a first trailer released in September 2026.

== Reception ==
The series received a four-star review in The Guardian with particular praise for the central performance of Harewood. The Times said that "Harewood’s rounded, charismatic performance gives Pierre heft and quality" with "themes [that] are current and complex" and that "having watched the whole series, I can say with conviction it’s worth your time". The Daily Telegraph described it as "dreadful," saying that "Pierre serves up crooked coppers, clunky exposition and a script best enjoyed as stock-phrase bingo".
