= Coláiste Ráithín =

Second level school in Bray, County Wicklow, Ireland

Location
- Dublin Road; Bray, County Wicklow; Ireland

Information
- School type: High school
- Founded: 1991
- Principal: Siobhán Nic Loinnsigh
- Staff: 25
- Years: First through sixth
- Gender: Mixed
- Age range: 12-19
- Enrollment: 340
- Website: www.raithin.ie

Coláiste Ráithín is a secondary school located in Bray, County Wicklow, Ireland, which was founded in 1991.

It is run by the Education and Training Board. The 340 pupils are taught through the medium of the Irish language.

In the 2010s, the school was awaiting a new school building for some time as the location at the time was too cramped for the ever-increasing student base. Students began moving to the new building in September 2018.

== Alumni ==
- Ferdia Walsh-Peelo (b. 1999) - actor and musician
- Florence Road, indie-rock band
