= Summer Solstice (2005 film) =

- Screenplay by: John Goldsmith
- Story by: Rosamunde Pilcher
- Directed by: Giles Foster
- Starring: Jason Durr; Jacqueline Bisset; Jan Niklas
- Theme music composer: Richard Blackford
- Countries of origin: Germany; United Kingdom
- Original language: English

Production
- Producer: David Cunliffe
- Cinematography: Rex Maidment
- Editor: Catherine Creed
- Running time: 132 mins
- Production companies: TMG; Gate Television; ZDF; ORF

Original release
- Network: ZDF; Channel 5
- Release: 25 December 2005

Summer Solstice is a 2005 German-produced two-part television film, a sequel to the 2000 novel Winter Solstice by Rosamunde Pilcher, which was made a television film in 2004. The film, however, is not based on a novel, but was written by Pilcher directly for the screen. It stars Jason Durr, Jacqueline Bisset, Sinéad Cusack, Honor Blackman and Franco Nero.

== Plot ==
Summer Solstice continues the story from Winter Solstice three years later, in the summertime. As then, the story is set in the Scottish Highlands. Sam and Carrie's newly formed business empire is struggling. The exclusive Rhives Castle Hotel is not attracting enough guests and The Langmore and Highland Gazette, the local newspaper which they own, has run a potentially libellous story concerning best-selling author, Alexia White. On top of everything Carrie has news which surprises Sam. Elfrida gets her big break when she is offered a small part in a soap opera, however, this is going to mean more time away from her beloved Oscar. Meanwhile Lucinda, The Countess of Rhives, is enjoying her new-found lease of life away from the burden of running the castle.

== Release ==
The film was first shown on ZDF in Germany on 25 December 2005. In the United Kingdom, it first received a straight-to-DVD release in 2006, but was later broadcast by Channel 5, with the first airing on 11 June 2012.
