= Two for Joy =

- Festival premiere poster
- Directed by: Tom Beard
- Written by: Tom Beard
- Produced by: Emma Comley; Sadie Frost
- Starring: Samantha Morton; Billie Piper; Emilia Jones; Bella Ramsey; Badger Skelton; Daniel Mays
- Cinematography: Tim Sidell
- Edited by: Izabella Curry
- Music by: Rodaidh McDonald
- Production companies: Blonde to Black Pictures; Goldfinch; Head Gear Films; Metrol Technology; Creative England; BFI
- Distributed by: Lorton Distribution (UK)
- Release date: 27 September 2018
- Running time: 89 minutes
- Country: United Kingdom
- Language: English

Two for Joy is a 2018 British psychological drama film written and directed by Tom Beard and starring Samantha Morton, Billie Piper, Emilia Jones, Bella Ramsey, Badger Skelton, and Daniel Mays. It is Beard's feature directorial debut.

The film premiered on 27 September 2018, in the United Kingdom, and was later widely released two years later on 27 April 2021.

== Premise ==
When Aisha descends into depression after her husband's death, her oldest daughter Vi finds herself forced to bear the major responsibilities of a parent, while her younger son Troy is excluded from school and increasingly cut off from the rest of the family. From there, an unexpected tragedy will either make or break an already fractured family.

== Cast ==
- Samantha Morton as Aisha
- Emilia Jones as Vi
- Billie Piper as Lillah
- Bella Ramsey as Miranda
- Badger Skelton as Troy
- Daniel Mays as Lias

== Reception ==
The film has a 100% rating on Rotten Tomatoes out of 16 reviews. Beth Webb of Empire awarded the film four stars out of five.

Stephen Farber of The Hollywood Reporter gave the film a positive review and wrote "Beard expects us to learn about the characters through their physical interactions as well as their facial expressions, and we end up caring deeply about these people even without conventional movie storytelling."
