= CODA (2021 film) =

Film by Sian Heder

- Official release poster
- Directed by: Sian Heder
- Screenplay by: Sian Heder
- Based on: La Famille Bélier by: Victoria Bedos; Thomas Bidegain; Stanislas Carré de Malberg; Éric Lartigau
- Produced by: Fabrice Gianfermi; Philippe Rousselet; Jérôme Seydoux; Patrick Wachsberger
- Starring: Emilia Jones; Eugenio Derbez; Troy Kotsur; Ferdia Walsh-Peelo; Daniel Durant; Marlee Matlin
- Cinematography: Paula Huidobro
- Edited by: Geraud Brisson
- Music by: Marius de Vries
- Production companies: Pathé; Vendôme Pictures
- Distributed by: Apple Original Films (through Apple TV+)
- Release dates: January 28, 2021 (Sundance); August 13, 2021 (United States)
- Running time: 111 minutes
- Countries: France; United States
- Languages: American Sign Language; English
- Budget: $10 million
- Box office: $2.2 million

CODA is a 2021 comedy-drama film written and directed by Sian Heder. An English-language remake of the 2014 French-Belgian film La Famille Bélier, it stars Emilia Jones as Ruby Rossi, the child of deaf adults (CODA) and only hearing member of her family, who attempts to help her family's struggling fishing business while pursuing her aspirations to become a singer.

The movie uses deaf actors to play the deaf characters, who, along with Jones, communicate using American Sign Language. Eugenio Derbez, Troy Kotsur, Ferdia Walsh-Peelo, Daniel Durant (in his feature film debut), and Marlee Matlin are featured in supporting roles. An international co-production between the United States and France, with Philippe Rousselet producing, as La Famille Bélier, it was filmed on location in Gloucester, Massachusetts, in the United States.

CODA had its world premiere on January 28, 2021, at the 2021 Sundance Film Festival, where Apple acquired its distribution rights for a festival-record $25 million. The film was released through the Apple TV+ streaming service on August 13, 2021. It received largely positive reviews from critics, who praised Heder's screenplay and Kotsur's performance, although feedback from deaf viewers was polarized. It was named one of the top 10 films of 2021 by the American Film Institute and has since been cited as among the best films of the 2020s.

CODA won numerous awards, including all three of its nominations at the 94th Academy Awards – Best Picture, Best Supporting Actor for Kotsur, and Best Adapted Screenplay, becoming the seventh Best Picture winner to win every award for which it was nominated. (Note: The other films to accomplish this feat are Wings (1927), Grand Hotel (1932), It Happened One Night (1934), Gigi (1958), The Last Emperor (1987), and The Lord of the Rings: The Return of the King (2003).) It became both the first film distributed by a streaming service and the first film premiered at the Sundance Film Festival to win Best Picture. Kotsur also became the first male deaf actor to win an Academy Award and a BAFTA Award. The film also won the Producers Guild of America Award for Best Theatrical Motion Picture and the Screen Actors Guild Award for Outstanding Performance by a Cast in a Motion Picture in addition to the BAFTA Award for Best Adapted Screenplay and the Writers Guild of America Award for Best Adapted Screenplay.

A stage musical adaptation was in the works as of 2024.

== Plot ==
In Gloucester, Massachusetts, 17-year-old Ruby Rossi is the only hearing member of her family; her parents, Frank and Jackie, and older brother, Leo, are all deaf. Ruby assists with the family fishing business and plans to join it full-time after high school. One day at school, Ruby sees her crush, Miles Patterson, signing up for choir as his elective, so she also signs up. The music teacher, Mr. Bernardo "Mr. V" Villalobos, encourages Ruby to sing more and assigns her to a duet with Miles.

Meanwhile, Frank and Leo struggle to make ends meet with the fishing business as new fees and sanctions are imposed by the local board. At a board meeting, everyone is angry about the fact that more boats are disappearing from the harbor. During the yelling, Frank announces that he is going to start his own company to get around the new restrictions and intends to sell his fish on his own, inviting other local fishermen to join him. The family struggles to get the new business off the ground, relying on Ruby to spread the word.

Mr. V encourages Ruby to audition for Berklee College of Music, his alma mater, and offers her private lessons to prepare. Ruby agrees, but her increasing commitments to the family business (her parents are dependent upon her to interpret for them) cause her to be late to their lessons. Mr. V grows irritated with Ruby's constant tardiness and chastises her for wasting his time and not caring enough about music.

While fishing one day, when Ruby is off swimming with Miles, Frank and Leo sail with a federal fishing observer on board, who does not know in advance that they are deaf. The boat is intercepted by the Coast Guard after failing to respond to ship horns and radio calls. Frank and Leo are fined and have their fishing licenses suspended for negligence. When they tell Ruby that she should have been on the boat with them, Ruby tells them she cannot always interpret for them and she was not at fault. Frank and Leo appeal and get their license back on the condition that they have a hearing person on board at all times. Ruby announces to the family that she is forgoing college and will join the business full-time. Frank and Jackie are supportive, but Leo reacts angrily, insisting that they can manage without Ruby as she truly has talent. He and Ruby later have an argument where he tells her that she will forever regret not going to college.

Ruby's family attends her choir recital and notices the positive reception from the surrounding audience. That night, Frank asks Ruby to sing for him while he feels her vocal cords, growing emotional. The family then drives to Boston with Ruby for her Berklee audition. Before her audition, she sees Miles, who reveals that he failed at his audition and wishes her luck. Ruby's family sneaks up to the balcony while Mr. V comes to accompany her on piano. Ruby is nervous and unprepared at first, but after Mr. V deliberately makes a mistake on his accompaniment, she is allowed to start again and gains confidence when she sees her family. Ruby signs along while singing "Both Sides, Now" by Joni Mitchell, so they can understand what she is singing.

Ruby is accepted to Berklee and invites Miles to visit her in Boston. Meanwhile, the hearing workers in the family's fishing business have been learning sign language, enabling them to communicate with and interpret for the family. Ruby's friend Gertie drives her to Boston for college as her family sees them off; Frank verbally tells her, "Go," and Ruby signs, "I love you so much" (literal translation: "I really love you") to them as they drive away.

== Cast ==
- Emilia Jones as Ruby Rossi
- Eugenio Derbez as Bernardo "Mr. V" Villalobos, the high school choir director
- Troy Kotsur as Frank Rossi, Ruby's father
- Ferdia Walsh-Peelo as Miles Patterson, Ruby's crush
- Marlee Matlin as Jackie Rossi, Ruby's mother
- Daniel Durant as Leo Rossi, Ruby's brother
- Amy Forsyth as Gertie, Ruby's best friend
- Sarah Clarke as Tanya
- Kevin Chapman as Brady
- John Fiore as Tony Salgado
- Rebecca Gibel as Joanne Biles
- Emilia Faucher as Misha

== Production ==
=== Development and writing ===
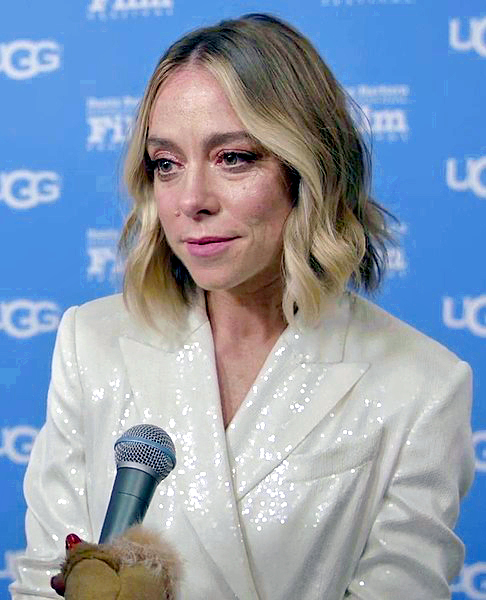
Sian Heder, the film's writer and director

CODA, written and directed by Sian Heder, is an English-language remake of the French-language film La Famille Bélier, which was released in 2014 and was successful at the French box office. Philippe Rousselet was one of the original film's producers, and he had the right to do a remake. He and producer Patrick Wachsberger approached Heder to direct a remake for a United States audience. Heder said, "They were interested in adapting the film, but they wanted someone to make it unique and take the premise from the original and, also, reinvent it." By May 2019, the companies Pathé Films and Vendôme Group had formed a film production partnership to develop and produce English-language films, with the first being CODA.

CODA is set in Gloucester, Massachusetts. While its predecessor La Famille Bélier was set on a rural dairy farm in France, Heder chose to set CODA in Gloucester, being familiar with the city from visiting the North Shore in the summer when growing up. Heder explained, "For me, it has the combination of being very picturesque and quintessentially New England but also with a working-class grit to it." Heder learned American Sign Language in the process of writing the script, with 40% of it ultimately being in ASL. The director was helped by two deaf collaborators whom she called "ASL masters", Alexandria Wailes and Anne Tomasetti.

To prepare for the film, Heder observed a fish processing plant and consulted the local harbormaster about how authorities would raid a boat. She received feedback from director Kenneth Lonergan—who directed the 2016 film Manchester by the Sea, which was set in Manchester-by-the-Sea, Massachusetts—and members of the fishing-industry nonprofit Gloucester Fishermen's Wives Association. Several consultants and a fisherman educated Heder in local fishing practices.

=== Casting ===
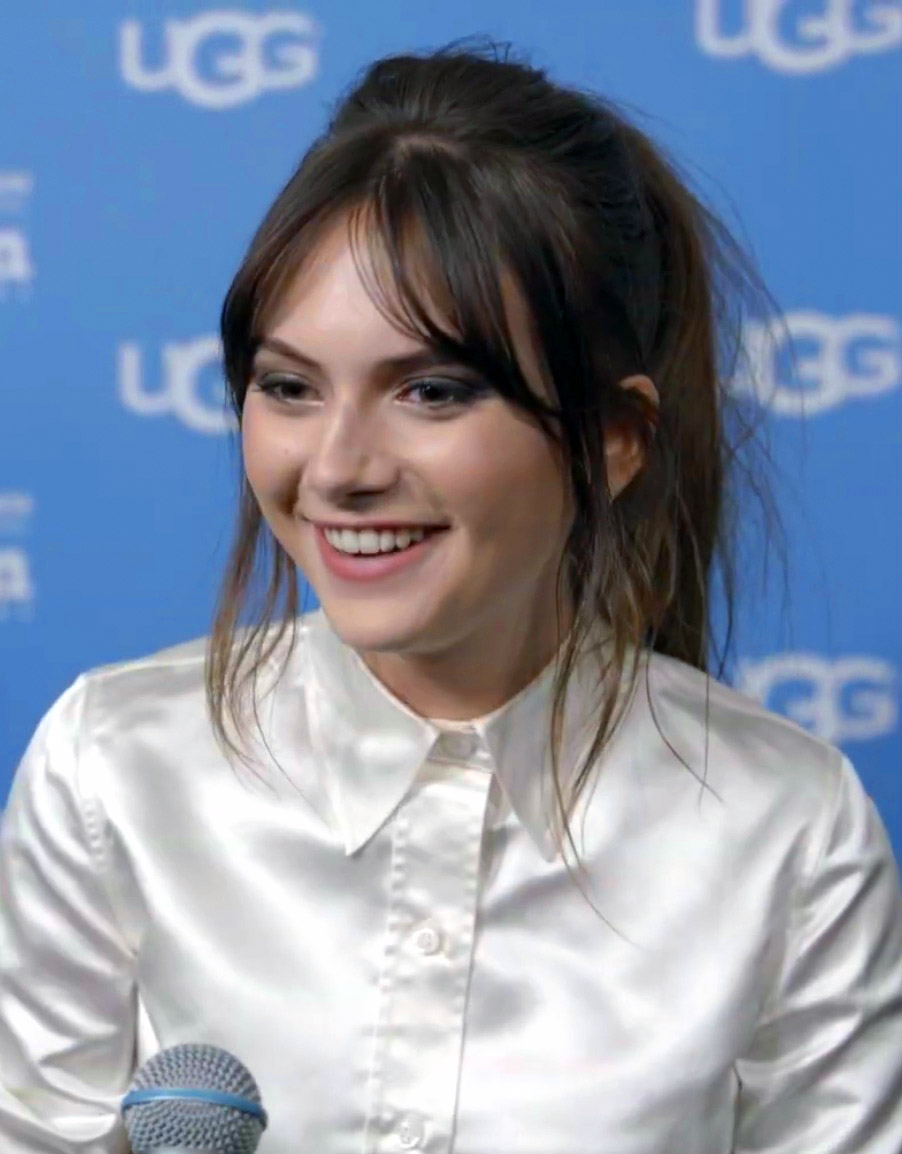
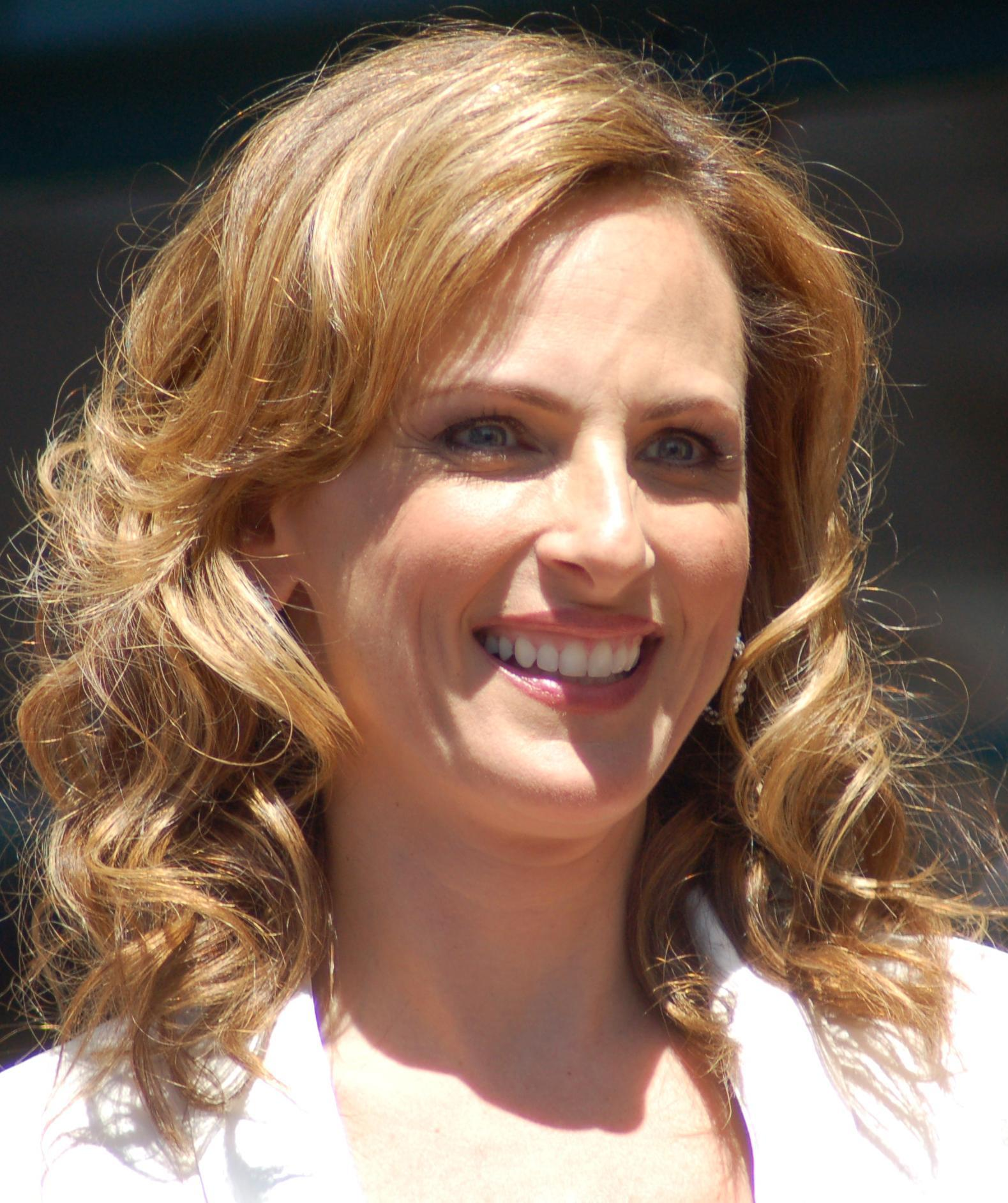
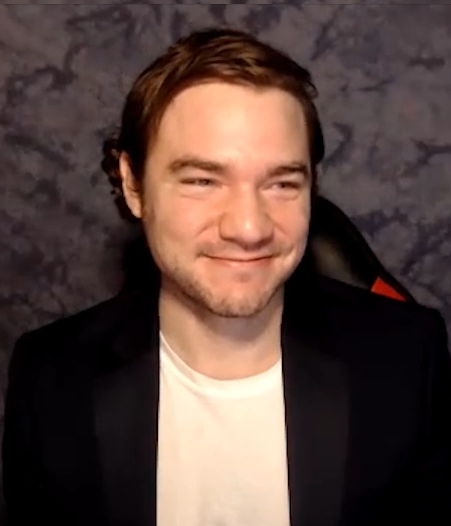
Emilia Jones (left) plays Ruby, the film's protagonist. Marlee Matlin (center) was the first person to be cast, while Daniel Durant (right) made his feature film acting debut in this film.

Marlee Matlin, an award-winning and internationally known actress, was the first person cast for the film. During the development process, the film's financiers resisted casting deaf actors for the remaining deaf characters, but Matlin threatened to drop out unless deaf actors were cast, and the financiers ultimately relented.

Heder described the casting as an opportunity for Matlin to play against type, her previous roles have been "'put-together' and classy characters". Heder said, "Marlee, in real life, is much more funny, and she has a dirty sense of humor. This (role) was a working-class fisherman's wife, and she has a lot of elements of her personality that were very right for this character." Matlin used her connections with Deaf West Theatre in Los Angeles, California, to help Heder find additional deaf actors. Heder saw Troy Kotsur in a Deaf West production and cast him as the fisherman and father. She cast Daniel Durant after finding him through auditions. Matlin, Kotsur, and Durant were already familiar with one another through their collaboration on the Deaf West production of the musical Spring Awakening.

Matlin described her interest in getting CODA made, "I felt that audiences would really see deaf people in a film ... There are so many levels for people to identify with and, for people with no connection, who have never met a deaf person, to see sign language, to see deaf people in normal, day-to-day settings ... People think that deaf people are monolithic in how they approach life. And this film bursts that myth ... But to burst that myth, it had to be told as authentically as possible. And it's strange because studios clearly have the ability to greenlight a film and cast whomever they want, and there continues to be a lack of awareness that you can tell universal stories with deaf characters." Kotsur said, "You have to think a little bit outside the box and present more opportunities, instead of just having two options ... You know, you write this script because somebody's deaf, or I'm writing it because it's a character that happens to be deaf. There's a distinction there."

Heder hired a rotating group of ASL interpreters that facilitated communication with signing and speaking among the cast and crew. She connected with the deaf community in nearby Boston to secure the interpreters for on-set communication. Matlin said, "[Heder] really immersed herself into our culture and made every attempt to learn and to work with us and having two directors of sign language on the set, plus interpreters, plus the crew who learned our language, everyone working together, it was working like on any other set, but the sign language aspect made it extra special."

The director also auditioned hundreds of teenage girls before casting Emilia Jones as the hearing member of the deaf family. Jones took voice lessons and learned ASL for nine months before filming started. Heder also chose to cast Eugenio Derbez as the girl's choirmaster, seeing him as a fit for her "amalgamation of Heder's college rhythm teacher and her high school drama and English teachers".

=== Filming ===
The film was shot on location in Gloucester, Massachusetts, in the middle of 2019.

In the film, the family lives in what WBUR's The ARTery described as a "creaky clapboard cottage [with] a yard jammed with boats, traps, and nets". During location scouting, Heder came across what she found to be the ideal house for the family home and received permission from its residents to use it as a filming location. The choirmaster's home was a Victorian-style house on the sea, where Heder had visited family friends multiple times in her childhood, and they allowed her to film there.

The portrayal of "Gloucester High School" was actually the old Briscoe Middle School in Beverly, Massachusetts, which had previously closed, in preparation to being converted to the Beverly Village for Living & the Arts.

A fisherman who educated Heder in local fishing practices allowed his fishing trawler to be used as a film set. Scenes set in a flooded quarry were filmed at the Steel Derrick quarry in Rockport, Massachusetts.

Ruby's audition at Berklee was filmed at the Shalin Liu Performance Center in Rockport.

== Music ==
Marius de Vries composed the film's soundtrack and compiled and co-produced the album with Nicholai Baxter, featuring the original score and incorporated songs. Speaking on creating music for the film, which had predominantly deaf characters playing the leading roles, he called it his "biggest challenge" and added that the music should be strong to connect with the emotions. Most of the incorporated songs in the film were recorded live and sung by the lead actors Emilia Jones and Ferdia Walsh-Peelo, accompanied by the CODA choir, who were students at Berklee College of Music and Gloucester High School. The soundtrack also featured an original song sung by Jones, "Beyond the Shore," which is played during the end credits of the film. The soundtrack album was released by Republic Records on August 13, 2021, coinciding with the film's release.

== Release ==
=== Screening ===
CODA had its world premiere on January 28, 2021, at the 2021 Sundance Film Festival as one of the opening-day films. It screened as part of the festival's US Dramatic Competition. Due to the COVID-19 pandemic in the United States at the time, CODA was screened virtually. The film went on to win the U.S. Grand Jury Prize, U.S. Dramatic Audience Award, and a Special Jury Ensemble Cast Award at the festival. The film's director Sian Heder won Best Director in the U.S. Dramatic section.

The film received "immediate rave reviews", according to Agence France Presse, which highlighted the positive comments from Variety and Deadline Hollywood. IndieWire wrote, "[Heder] has reportedly crafted a crowd-pleasing tearjerker whose commercial promise will easily spark a bidding war between theatrical distributors and deep-pocketed streamers." USA Today summarized the reception, "Propelled by its powerful inclusivity of the deaf community, it's a refreshing reboot of the traditional teen romance and coming-of-age story."

Two days after CODA's premiere, Apple beat out multiple companies, notably Amazon Studios, to acquire worldwide distribution rights to the film for a festival-record $25 million. However, this sale enraged multiple international distributors to whom Pathé had pre-sold the film to help finance the independent production's $10 million budget, with buyback offers from its financers being met with outright refusal. Although Apple managed to buy out rights in countries such as Germany, theatrical releases proceeded in others such as Latin America, the Nordics, Japan, and Italy, with the film earning at least $2.2 million from international showings.

In March 2022, CODA was screened for the First Family at the White House Family Theater.

=== Streaming ===
The film was released through the streaming service Apple TV+ in selected countries on August 13, 2021. IndieWire estimated the film grossed around $100,000 in its domestic opening weekend.

Apple spent about $10 million on the film's award campaign. By March 20, 2022, the film had been streamed in 973,000 households in the United States, including 375,000 since the Oscar nomination announcements on February 8. In the three days following its Best Picture win, the film saw a 300% increase in views from the previous week and was the most-streamed program on Apple TV+.

According to Kotsur, the film was initially rated R "for language," as displayed in the subtitles during the deaf characters' dialogue in some scenes, but after several "back-and-forths" and fights with the MPA, it was ultimately reduced to PG-13 "for strong sexual content and language, and drug use" months before its official release. Kotsur added "...vulgar sign language is just a part of our culture. But are you hearing people ready? That's why it was so cool. It's fascinating to see that in the script".

=== Home media ===
Universal Pictures Home Entertainment and AV Entertainment jointly released the movie on DVD, Blu-ray Disc and Ultra HD Blu-ray on November 4, 2025.

== Reception ==
=== Critical response ===
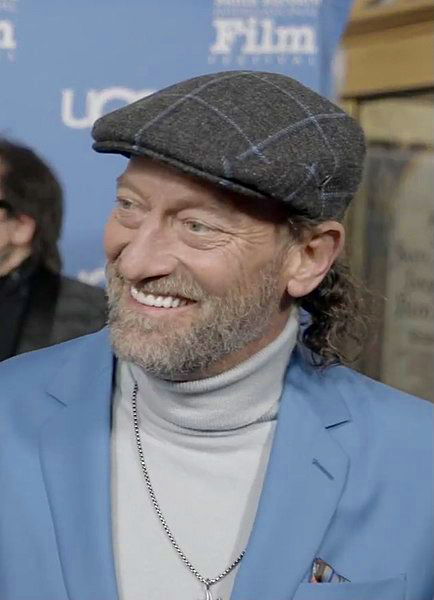
Troy Kotsur received critical acclaim for his performance and won the Academy Award for Best Supporting Actor.

Review aggregator website Rotten Tomatoes reported that 94% of 295 reviews of the film were positive, with an average rating of 7.8/10. The site's critics' consensus reads, "CODA's story offers few surprises, but strong representation and a terrific cast—led by Emilia Jones' brilliant performance—bring this coming-of-age story vividly to life." Metacritic assigned the film a weighted average score of 72 out of 100, based on 46 critics, indicating "generally favorable" reviews.

Benjamin Lee's Guardian-based three-star review offered this summary: "Coda is a mostly likable concoction, but one that's just too formulaic and ultimately rather calculated to secure the emotional response it so desperately wants by the big finale." Writing for The New York Times, editor Jeannette Catsoulis wrote, "An openhearted embrace of deaf culture elevates this otherwise conventional tale of a talented teenager caught between ambition and loyalty". Variety's Owen Gleiberman stated that Sian Heder had got the gift, "the holy essence of how to shape and craft a drama that spins and burbles and flows". His feeling was that the film "brings this all off with such sincerity and precision" and is so "enthrallingly well-acted, that you may come away feeling grateful that this kind of mainstream dramatic craftsmanship still exists", and also praised Jones and Kotsur's performances.

The Hollywood Reporter's Jon Frosch opined that "CODA faithfully works its way through a checklist of tropes from high school comedies, disability dramas, musical-prodigy and inspiring-teacher narratives, coming-of-age tales about young people struggling to declare independence from overbearing families and indie chronicles of blue-collar America." Ann Hornaday of The Washington Post called it an "old-fashioned movie that adheres to admittedly familiar principles of storytelling and emotional stakes, but by way of such a winning cast, evocative atmosphere and genuine tone that its impossible not to love".

RogerEbert.com based critic Tomris Laffly wrote "It's not that Heder doesn't embrace the aforesaid conventions for all their comforting worth — she does. But by twisting the formula and placing this recognizable story inside a new, perhaps even groundbreaking setting with such loving, acutely observed specificity, she pulls off nothing short of a heartwarming miracle with her film." Brian Lowry of CNN described it as "small movie that hits all the right notes".

In contrast, Tim Robey, writing for The Telegraph, criticized it as "dramedy that could have taken more risks", and added, "Heder's script makes every easy and rigged choice available, reducing far too many of the family dynamics to the level of a bickering sitcom." Comparing it with the Darius Marder-directed Sound of Metal (2020), which he called "a genuinely adventurous, formally experimental take on deaf issues", he wrote that CODA "feels too cute by half".

=== Response from the deaf community ===
Deaf viewers had varied reactions to the film. They praised the casting and performances of deaf actors and found the depiction of deaf characters as self-sufficient and sexually active people to be in welcome contrast to previous depictions on screen. Delbert Whetter, vice chair of nonprofit RespectAbility, said, "After seeing so many stories where people with disabilities are depicted as helpless, forlorn souls needing to be rescued, it is so refreshing to see a story with deaf characters that are small business owners and leaders in their fishing community, with depth and nuance that rival and even exceed that of their hearing counterparts in the story." Deaf writer Sara Nović also said, "I liked that these characters were sexual beings—deaf and disabled people are often neutered or virginal in movies and books, and that's extremely boring and inaccurate."

Jenna Beacom, a sensitivity reader and young adult author, found much of the film "misrepresented, especially deaf people's competence and ability to thrive in 2021", and said that, while "thrilled that the movie exists, in the sense of contributing to more deaf representation and hopefully more opportunities for even better representation", she was "very disturbed by how negatively the movie portrays the deaf and CODA experiences." A deaf parent of a singer herself, Beacom found the film's assumption "that being deaf means that you can't enjoy music, or understand anyone else's enjoyment" to be unfounded. Nović also said, "I actually think the story of a first-gen college student, just without the music—she could have been studying anything—is more compelling, anyway ... I don't think that we needed the music part for this to be an interesting story."

Other viewers also criticized the portrayal of deaf characters' inability to appreciate music as a common trope in films featuring deaf characters, such as Mr. Holland's Opus, Beyond Silence, and Sound of Metal. Lennard J. Davis, a CODA and disability scholar, wrote, "this genre of films is glued to a different reality: it is as if birds were obsessed with making movies in which humans were miserable about their inability to fly."

The film's depiction of the hearing child interpreting for her parents even in settings where professional interpreters would be required by the Americans with Disabilities Act of 1990, such as a court hearing and medical appointments, received widespread criticism as being misrepresentative.

=== Legacy ===
In 2023, Screen Rant ranked it number 5 on its list of "The 10 Best Movies of the 2020s (So Far)," writing that "Every so often, there is a small indie movie that comes out of nowhere and surprises everyone. CODA is the most recent example of such a sleeper hit and one of the most crowd-pleasing movies of the 2020s...this small family drama that was filled with light-hearted moments won over so many people and left plenty of tears in their eyes."

It also ranked number 18 on Collider's list of "The 20 Best Drama Movies of the 2020s So Far," calling it "one of the definitive crowd pleasers of the decade." MovieWeb ranked it number 15 on its list of the "20 Most Underrated Films of the Last 5 Years," writing that "it certainly deserves way more credit" and called it "groundbreaking in its representation of disability."

In 2025, it was one of the films voted for the "Readers' Choice" edition of The New York Times' list of "The 100 Best Movies of the 21st Century," finishing at number 280.

=== Accolades ===
At the 94th Academy Awards, CODA won all three awards that it was nominated for: Best Picture, Best Supporting Actor (Kotsur), and Best Adapted Screenplay. It is the first film produced or distributed by a streaming service, the first Sundance film, and the first film featuring predominantly deaf actors in leading roles to win the Academy Award for Best Picture. The film had the fewest nominations for a Best Picture winner since 1932's Grand Hotel, and is also the sixth film and the first since 2018's Green Book to win Best Picture without a director nomination.

CODA was nominated for Best Motion Picture - Drama and Best Supporting Actor (for Kotsur) at the 79th Golden Globe Awards. It received three nominations at the 75th British Academy Film Awards, winning two, including Best Supporting Actor for Kotsur, making him the first deaf person to ever win a BAFTA, and Best Adapted Screenplay for Heder. At the 28th Screen Actors Guild Awards, the film made history with Kotsur, Matlin and Durant becoming the first deaf/non-hearing performers to win, along with Jones, Derbez and Walsh-Peelo, for Outstanding Performance by a Cast in a Motion Picture. At the 33rd Producers Guild of America Awards, the film was also awarded the Producers Guild of America Award for Best Theatrical Motion Picture.

CODA was one of 28 films that received the ReFrame Stamp for 2021, awarded by the gender equity coalition ReFrame for films that are proven to have gender-balanced hiring. The film was also given the Seal of Authentic Representation from the Ruderman Family Foundation for Matlin's and Durant's roles as Ruby's mother and brother. The seal is given to films and series that feature actors with disabilities who have at least five lines of dialogue.

== Planned stage musical adaptation ==
On March 23, 2022, it was reported by The New York Times that, in an effort to keep the film relevant after awards season, its producers plan to team up with Deaf West Theatre to develop a stage musical adaptation of the film, with a creative team and production scheduled yet to be announced. DJ Kurs, Deaf West's artistic director, expressed excitement for the project: "As a Deaf person, I knew from the start that CODA would make a perfect musical: It addresses our relationship with music and how we move through the world of sound like immigrants in a foreign country, learning new, seemingly arbitrary rules on the fly." Like Deaf West's production of Spring Awakening, the musical will incorporate both signing in American Sign Language and live singing.

The report also noted that Rousselet had been asked in 2014 about making a stage version of La Famille Bélier, but that he and the producers wanted to prioritize making CODA and forging a relationship with Deaf West first. Rousselet further remarked "It's going to be a new adventure for us. But I think it has everything – the characters, the music, the wonderful environment – to make a beautiful musical." Kotsur said that he hopes the musical will have its initial staging within two years; he seemed to suggest that he might reprise his role as Frank in the production. Kurs noted his desire to have Matlin and Durant also reprise their roles as Jackie and Leo, respectively, along with Kotsur.

In August 2024, Deaf West Theatre announced its 2024–25 season and officially confirmed that the musical is still in the works.

== See also ==
- Beyond Silence, German film released in December 1996 with similar plot
- Children of a Lesser God, released in October 1986, also stars Marlee Matlin in her Oscar-winning role and explores similar themes and subjects
- Khamoshi: The Musical, Indian film released in August 1996 with similar story
- List of films featuring the deaf and hard of hearing
- Sound of Metal
