= Daniel Durant =

American actor

- Daniel Durant attending the "Being Heumann" Premiere at TIFF 2026
- Born: December 24, 1989 (age 36); Detroit, Michigan, U.S.
- Education: Gallaudet University
- Occupation: Actor
- Years active: 2012–present
- Spouse: Britt Stewart (m. 2025)

Daniel N. Durant (born December 24, 1989) is an American stage and screen actor. Deaf since birth, his breakthrough starring role was as Moritz Stiefel in the 2015 Broadway revival of Spring Awakening. Durant had a major supporting role in the Academy Award-winning film CODA (2021). He and the cast won the Special Jury Award for Ensemble Cast in the U.S. Dramatic Competition at its world premiere at the 2021 Sundance Film Festival, along with the award for Outstanding Performance by a Cast in a Motion Picture at the 28th Screen Actors Guild Awards. On television, he is known for his recurring role in the ABC Family series Switched at Birth (2013–2017).

== Early life ==
Durant was born deaf in Detroit, Michigan to deaf parents who struggled with addiction; he was adopted as a toddler by his paternal aunt Lori Durant and later her wife Mary Engels. He grew up in Duluth, Minnesota. He attended the Minnesota State Academy for the Deaf in Faribault and graduated in 2008. He studied at the National Technical Institute for the Deaf at the Rochester Institute of Technology (RIT) in Rochester, New York, receiving an associate degree in applied computer technology in 2011. He subsequently attended Gallaudet University, earning a degree in 2014.

He joined the Deaf West Theatre in 2012 for its production of Cyrano de Bergerac.

== Career ==
On September 8, 2022, Durant was announced as a contestant on season 31 of Dancing with the Stars. He was partnered with Britt Stewart. They reached the semifinals and finished in fifth place. Durant performed the National Anthem in ASL at Super Bowl LVIII.

Durant was cast in the October 2024 "ASL-infused" revival of American Idiot, presented by Centre Theatre Group and Deaf West Theater, coinciding with the 20th anniversary of Green Day's original album release.

== Personal life ==
Durant entered a romantic relationship with his Dancing with the Stars partner Britt Stewart in November 2022, shortly after his stint on the competition series ended. In order to communicate with him, Stewart made the decision to learn ASL. They got engaged on Christmas Eve 2023 during a hike in Lake Arrowhead, California. Durant and Stewart were married on August 23, 2025, in Santa Margarita, California. A number of their friends from the entertainment industry attended the ceremony, including Durant's CODA co-stars Troy Kotsur and Marlee Matlin.

== Filmography ==
=== Film ===
Year	Title	Role	Notes
2020	Silent Notes	Bruce	
2021	CODA	Leo Rossi	
2026	Being Heumann	Steve McCleeland	
TBA	Flash Before the Bang		Post-production

=== Television ===
Year	Title	Role	Notes
2012	The Archives at Gallaudet University	Gallaudet Student	TV Short
2013–2017	Switched at Birth	Matthew	17 episodes
2019	You	James Kennedy	Episode: "Farewell, My Bunny"
2022	Good Morning America	Himself	Guest
2022	Dancing with the Stars	Himself	Contestant (Season 31)
2023	Florida Man	Max	
2023	Chicago Med	Aiden Rogers	Episode: "Look Closely and You Might Hear the Truth"

=== Theater ===
Year	Title	Role	Venue	Production company	Notes
2012	Cyrano	Ensemble	The Fountain Theater	Deaf West Theatre	Los Angeles production
2012	Police: Deaf: Near: Far	Stinger	Oakland University	TerpTheatre	Michigan production
2013	Flowers for Algernon	Charlie	Wild Fire Theatre	Deaf West Theatre	Los Angeles production
2014	Spring Awakening	Moritz Steifel	Rosenthal Theater	Deaf West Theatre	Los Angeles production
2015	Spring Awakening	Moritz Steifel	Wallis Annenberg Center	Deaf West Theatre	Los Angeles production
2015–16	Spring Awakening	Moritz Steifel	Brooks Atkinson Theatre	Deaf West Theatre	Broadway revival
2017	Jonas and the Body	Jonas	Teater Manu	Teater Manu	Norway production
2019	The Black Drum	Bulldog	Young Centre for the Performing Arts	Deaf Culture Centre	Toronto production
2019	The Black Drum	Bulldog	Clin d’Oeil Festival	Deaf Culture Centre	France production
2024	American Idiot	Johnny	Mark Taper Forum	Deaf West Theatre	Los Angeles production
2026	Elephant Shoes	Cy	Two River Theater	Deaf West Theatre	World Premiere New Jersey production

== Awards and nominations ==
Year	Award	Category	Work	Result
2015	Ovation Awards	Best Acting Ensemble for a Musical	Spring Awakening	Won
2015	BroadwayWorld LA Awards	Best Featured Actor in a Musical	Spring Awakening	Won
2016	Theatre World Awards	Outstanding Broadway Debut Performance	Spring Awakening	Won
2016	Broadway.com Audience Choice Awards	Favorite Onstage Pair (with Alex Boniello)	Spring Awakening	Nominated
2016	Fred and Adele Astaire Awards	Outstanding Ensemble in a Broadway Show	Spring Awakening	Nominated
2021	Sundance Film Festival	U.S. Dramatic Special Jury Award for Ensemble Cast	CODA	Won
2022	Screen Actors Guild Awards	Outstanding Performance by a Cast in a Motion Picture	CODA	Won
