= La Famille Bélier =

2014 film by Éric Lartigau

- French theatrical release poster
- Directed by: Éric Lartigau
- Written by: Victoria Bedos; Thomas Bidegain; Stanislas Carré de Malberg; Éric Lartigau
- Produced by: Philippe Rousselet; Éric Jehelmann; Stéphanie Bermann
- Starring: Karin Viard; François Damiens; Éric Elmosnino; Louane Emera
- Cinematography: Romain Winding
- Edited by: Jennifer Augé
- Music by: Evgueni Galperine; Sacha Galperine
- Production companies: France 2 Cinéma; Nexus Factory; Jerico; Mars Films; Quarante 12 Films; Vendôme Production; uMedia
- Distributed by: Mars Distribution
- Release dates: 7 November 2014 (Arras Film Festival); 17 December 2014 (France)
- Running time: 105 minutes
- Countries: France; Belgium
- Languages: French; French Sign Language
- Budget: $13 million
- Box office: $72.8 million

La Famille Bélier (released as The Bélier Family in Australia) is a 2014 French-Belgian coming-of-age comedy-drama film directed by Éric Lartigau. The film received six nominations at the 40th César Awards, winning Most Promising Actress for Louane Emera. It won a Magritte Award in the category of Best Foreign Film.

An English-language remake of the film, CODA, premiered in January 2021 and won three Academy Awards, including Best Picture. An Italian-language remake of the film, Non abbiam bisogno di parole (English: Feel My Voice) was premiered in April 2026.

== Plot ==
In the Bélier family, sixteen-year-old Paula is an interpreter for her deaf parents and brother on a daily basis, especially in the running of the family farm. Paula's choir is rehearsing songs by French singer Michel Sardou. The music teacher encourages Paula to audition for the Maîtrise de Radio France music college in Paris, which would secure her a career and a college degree. However, this decision would mean leaving her family and taking her first steps towards adulthood, a theme expressed in her audition song, Sardou's 'Je vole' ('I Fly').

== Cast ==
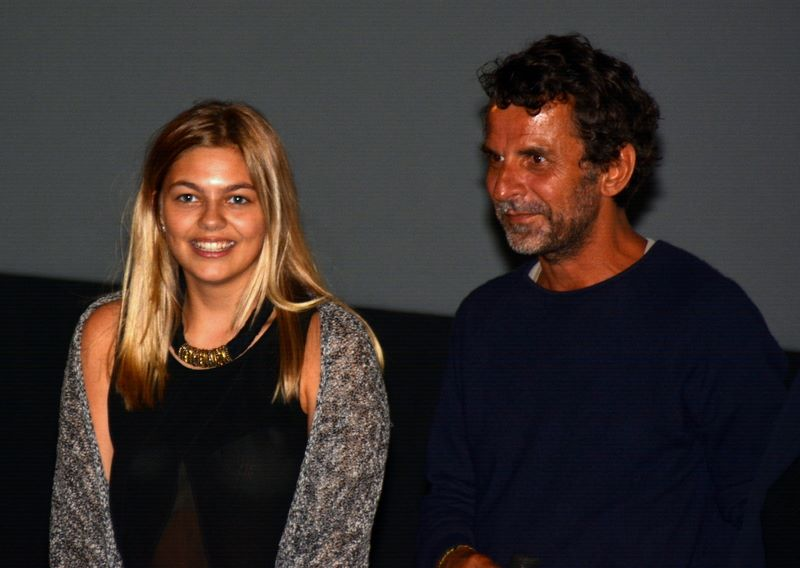
Louane Emera and Éric Lartigau at a preview event

- Karin Viard as Gigi Bélier
- François Damiens as Rodolphe Bélier
- Éric Elmosnino as Fabien Thomasson
- Louane Emera as Paula Bélier
- Roxane Duran as Mathilde
- Ilian Bergala as Gabriel Chevignon
- Luca Gelberg as Quentin Bélier
- Mar Sodupe as Mlle Dos Santos
- Stéphan Wojtowicz as Mayor Lapidus
- Jérôme Kircher as Dr. Pugeot
- Bruno Gomila as Rossigneux
- Clémence Lassalas as Karène

== Production ==
La Famille Bélier was shot in Domfront (Orne) and Le Housseau-Brétignolles (Mayenne).

== Music ==
The film was composed by Evgueni Galperine and Sacha Galperine. The theme song for the Japanese release is "Seishun no Tsubasa" by Maco.

== Box office ==
In cinemas, La Famille Bélier received 7,450,944 admissions, making it the second-most successful in the French box office for 2014, behind only Serial (Bad) Weddings. Outside of France, it received 3,877,283 cinema spectators.

The film was a commercial success, earning a reported $72,751,538 (US) worldwide against a budget of just under €11 million ($13 million US).

== Deaf response ==
Deaf French journalist Marylène Charrière, writing for Websourd, stated: "It's good to show the larger public what it means to be deaf to use French Sign Language. Most people are unaware, thinking that it is not a true language". Conversely, her colleague Julia Pelhate stated that "What is awkward is that French Sign Language is not respected. There are many mistakes. During the preview in Toulouse, on 31 October 2014, the deaf audience needed to read the subtitles, as it could not understand what was being signed on the screen".

The British newspaper The Independent reported that "Some —but not all— activists for the deaf are angry that two well-known actors with perfect hearing were cast to play Paula's parents who are users of French Sign Language. They also complain that the deaf characters are the main source of comedy in the film." Rebecca Atkinson, writing an opinion for The Guardian, criticized the premise, "A hearing child grows up in a totally deaf farming family, only to have a talent for singing that her family can't appreciate or access." Atkinson said, "Hearing people's fascination with the relationship between music and deafness just does not resonate with most deaf people." Atkinson also criticized the casting, "The film uses hearing actors to play the roles of deaf characters, the result of which is an embarrassing and crass interpretation of deaf culture and sign language."

== Accolades ==
Award / Film Festival	Category	Recipients and nominees	Result
César Awards	Best Film		Nominated
César Awards	Best Actor	François Damiens	Nominated
César Awards	Best Actress	Karin Viard	Nominated
César Awards	Best Supporting Actor	Éric Elmosnino	Nominated
César Awards	Most Promising Actress	Louane Emera	Won
César Awards	Best Original Screenplay	Victoria Bedos, Stanislas Carré de Malberg, Éric Lartigau and Thomas Bidegain	Nominated
European Film Awards	Best Comedy		Nominated
Globes de Cristal Award	Best Film		Nominated
Globes de Cristal Award	Best Actor	François Damiens	Nominated
Lumière Awards	Best Film		Nominated
Lumière Awards	Best Actress	Karin Viard	Won
Lumière Awards	Best Female Revelation	Louane Emera	Won
Lumière Awards	Best Screenplay	Victoria Bedos, Stanislas Carré de Malberg, Éric Lartigau and Thomas Bidegain	Nominated
Magritte Awards	Best Actor	François Damiens	Nominated
Magritte Awards	Best Foreign Film in Coproduction		Won
Sarlat Film Festival	Salamandre d'or (Audience Award)		Won

== Adaptations ==
=== English-language remake ===
An English-language remake, titled CODA, premiered on January 28, 2021, at the 2021 Sundance Film Festival, where Apple acquired its distribution rights and co-production partnership for a festival-record $25 million. The film was released in theaters and through the Apple TV+ streaming service on August 13, 2021. CODA won three Oscars at the 94th Academy Awards for Best Picture, Best Supporting Actor (Kotsur), and Best Adapted Screenplay. Among its various other accolades, the film won the Producers Guild of America Award for Best Theatrical Motion Picture and the Writers Guild of America Award for Best Adapted Screenplay, and its cast won the Screen Actors Guild Award for Outstanding Performance by a Cast in a Motion Picture.

=== Planned stage musical adaptation ===
On March 23, 2022, it was reported by The New York Times that in order to keep the film's English-language remake CODA relevance going after awards season, the film's producers will team up with Deaf West Theatre to develop a stage musical adaptation of the film, with a creative team and production calendar yet to be announced. DJ Kurs, Deaf West's artistic director, expressed excitement for the project by saying "As a Deaf person, I knew from the start that CODA would make a perfect musical: It addresses our relationship with music and how we move through the world of sound like immigrants in a foreign country, learning new, seemingly arbitrary rules on the fly." Like Deaf West's production of Spring Awakening, the musical will incorporate both signing in American Sign Language and live singing.

The report also revealed that Rousselet was originally asked in 2014 about making a stage version of La Famille Bélier prior to this incarnation, but that he and the producers wanted to prioritize making CODA and forging a relationship with Deaf West first before pursuing a stage version. Rousselet further remarked "It's going to be a new adventure for us. But I think it has everything — the characters, the music, the wonderful environment — to make a beautiful musical." Kotsur revealed that he hopes the musical will have its initial staging within two years, possibly hinting at his return to reprise his role as Frank in the production. Kurs also revealed his desire to have Matlin and Durant also come back to reprise their roles as Jackie and Leo, respectively, along with Kotsur.

== See also ==
- List of films featuring the deaf and hard of hearing
- Khamoshi: The Musical (1996), Indian Hindi language film with same story.
