= Philippe Rousselet =

French film producer

- Born: 7 July 1968 (age 58); Neuilly-sur-Seine, France
- Occupation: Film producer
- Parent: André Rousselet (father)

Philippe Rousselet (born 7 July 1968) is a French film producer. He won the Academy Award for Best Picture for the 2021 American film CODA, a remake of the 2014 French film La Famille Bélier, which he had also produced.

== Selected filmography ==
- Marie from the Bay of Angels (1997)
- Serial Lover (1998)
- Folle d'elle (1998)
- Barney and His Little Annoyances (2001)
- Blanche (2002)
- Tristan (2003)
- Papa (2005)
- Lord of War (2005)
- The Do-Gooders (2005)
- One Fine Day (2006)
- The Key (2007)
- Crossfire (2008)
- The Women on the 6th Floor (2010)
- Source Code (2011)
- Larry Crowne (2011)
- Paris Manhattan (2012)
- Haute Cuisine (2012)
- Anything for Alice (2014)
- The Grad Job (2014)
- La Famille Bélier (2014)
- Dad in Training (2015)
- Bastille Day (2016)
- West Coast (2016)
- Radin! (2016)
- Two Is a Family (2016)
- How I Met My Father (2017)
- What Happened to Monday (2017)
- In and Out (2017)
- Promise at Dawn (2017)
- Photo de famille (2018)
- Rémi sans famille (2018)
- Small Country: An African Childhood (2020)
- The Lost Prince (2020)
- CODA (2021; co-won with Fabrice Gianfermi and Patrick Wachsberger)
- Hear Me Out (2021)
- Farewell, Mr. Haffmann (2022)
- Lords of War (2027)
