= Ferdia Walsh-Peelo =

Irish actor and musician (born 1999)

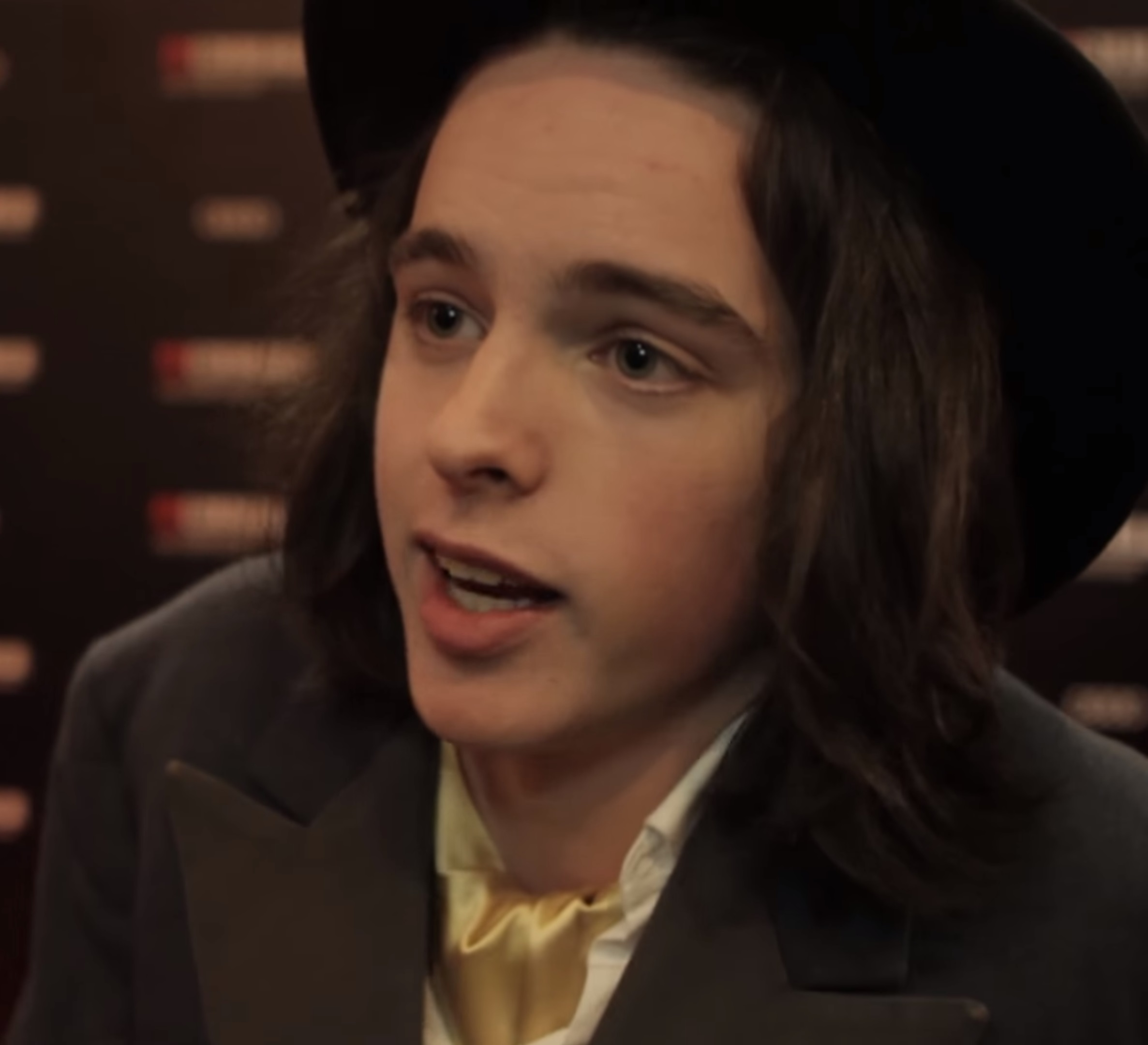
- Walsh-Peelo at the 2016 Dublin International Film Festival
- Born: 12 October 1999 (age 27); Ashford, County Wicklow, Ireland
- Occupations: Actor, musician, composer
- Years active: 2016–present

Ferdia Walsh-Peelo (/ˈwɒlʃˈpiloʊ/ WOLSH-PEE-loh; born 12 October 1999) is an Irish actor and musician. He made his film debut in the musical Sing Street (2016) and television debut in the History series Vikings (2017–2020). He has since appeared in the films Here Are the Young Men (2020) and CODA (2021).

== Early life and education ==
Walsh-Peelo was born in Ashford, County Wicklow. He attended Coláiste Ráithín, a Gaelscoil in Bray and Wicklow Educate Together National School. He received vocal coaching from his mother, soprano Toni Walsh.

== Career ==
Walsh-Peelo began his musical career as a boy soprano at the age of seven, winning many prizes throughout his early years. He was eventually cast in Mozart's Magic Flute aged twelve, which toured Ireland. Walsh-Peelo followed this up with the part of Miles in Britten's Turn of the Screw. In 2012, he appeared on Irish television in the famous Late Late Toy Show singing and playing piano. He was signed by William Morris Endeavor in the US and Independent Talent in the UK in 2015.

Walsh-Peelo made his onscreen acting debut in John Carney's 2016 musical comedy-drama film Sing Street alongside Lucy Boynton. During the film's screening at the Sundance Film Festival, he performed live with his co-star Mark McKenna.

In 2017, Walsh-Peelo began playing Alfred the Great in Vikings, a role he would play for the History series' final two seasons. He also played a young version of Aidan Gillen's character in the television film Dave Allen at Peace and appeared in the 2020 film Here Are the Young Men as Rez.

Walsh-Peelo played Miles, the singing partner and love interest of Ruby (Emilia Jones) in the 2021 Sundance Film Festival hit and Apple TV+ Original film CODA. He and the rest of the CODA cast won the SAG Award for Best Ensemble. Walsh-Peelo starred opposite Clara Rugaard in the British-Spanish World War II drama Love Gets a Room. He played Nick Kent in the biographical miniseries Pistol.

As of 2022, he is with a band called The Fynches.

== Personal life ==
Walsh-Peelo is an Ambassador for UNICEF Ireland's program Emergency Lessons, aimed at providing education to children who are in emergencies.

== Filmography ==
=== Film ===
Year	Title	Role	Notes
2016	Sing Street	Conor "Cosmo" Lawlor	
2020	Troubled Times	Eoghan	Short film
2020	Here Are the Young Men	Rez	
2020	Topping Out	Toby	Short film
2021	CODA	Miles	
2021	Love Gets a Room	Edmund	
2025	Juliet & Romeo	Tybalt	

=== Television ===
Year	Title	Role	Notes
2017–2020	Vikings	King Alfred	Recurring role (seasons 5–6)
2018	Dave Allen at Peace	Dave (age 18)	Television film
2022	Pistol	Nick Kent	Miniseries

== Awards and nominations ==
Year	Award	Category	Work	Result	Ref
2017	London Film Critics' Circle	Young British/Irish Performer of the Year	Sing Street	Nominated	
2017	Guild of Music Supervisors Awards	Best Song/Recording Created for a Film	Sing Street	Nominated	
2022	Screen Actors Guild Awards	Outstanding Performance by a Cast in a Motion Picture	CODA	Won	(Note: Shared.)
