= Emilia Jones =

British actress (born 2002)

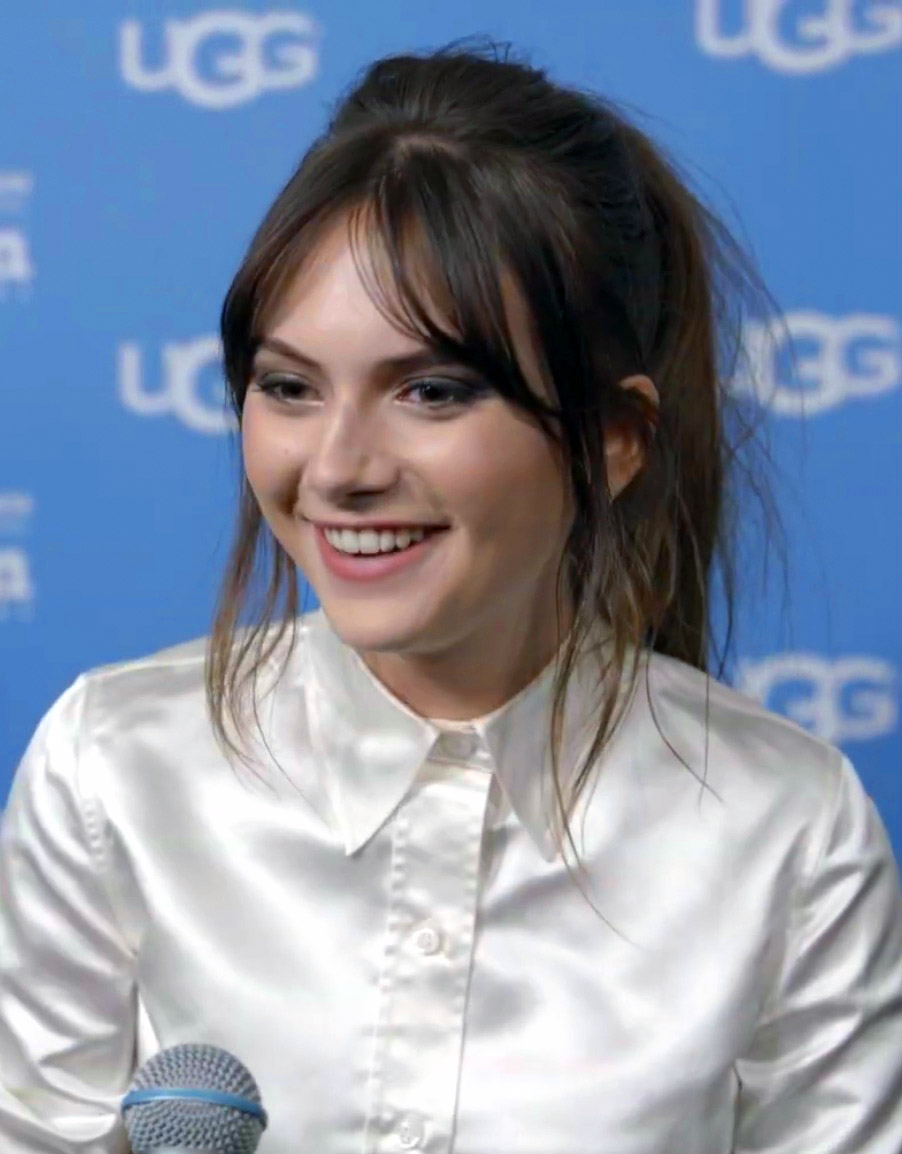
- Jones in 2022
- Born: 23 February 2002 (age 24); Westminster, London, England
- Occupations: Actress; singer
- Years active: 2010–present
- Parent: Aled Jones (father)

Emilia Jones (born 23 February 2002) is a British actress and singer. Known for her roles on stage and screen, she has received nominations for a BAFTA Film Award, a BAFTA Television Award, and a Critics' Choice Movie Award.

Jones made her film debut in a minor role in the action film Pirates of the Caribbean: On Stranger Tides (2011) before taking early roles in the western Brimstone (2016) and the psychological drama Two for Joy (2018). Her breakthrough came taking the leading role in the family drama film CODA (2021), for which she received a nomination for the BAFTA Award for Best Actress in a Leading Role. She then took starring roles in the psychological thriller Cat Person (2023), the romance Charlie Harper (2025) and the biographical dramedy Tony (2026).

On television, Jones also starred in the Netflix adventure series Locke & Key (2020–2022) and the HBO crime series Task (2025) the latter of which earned her a nomination for the British Academy Television Award for Best Supporting Actress. On stage, she worked as a child actress in the West End theatre as Young Fiona in Shrek the Musical (2011–2012) and Henry James' The Turn of the Screw (2013).

== Early life ==
Jones was born on 23 February 2002 in London to Welsh singer and presenter Aled Jones and his wife, English circus performer Claire Fossett. She grew up in Barnes with her younger brother Lucas. Jones attended an improvisation class run by an agent, through whom she was cast in One Day. She attended Kew House School in West London before concentrating on acting full time.

== Career ==
=== 2011–2019: Early roles ===
Jones' acting career began in 2010, at age eight, when she appeared as Jasmine in the film One Day. Jones portrayed Alice in the Channel 4 drama Utopia, and later that year, she played the young Queen of Years Merry Gejelh in the British television series Doctor Who episode "The Rings of Akhaten" (2013). The Boston Standard lauded Jones for "carr[ying] off her scenes with aplomb" and for "really sell[ing] Merry’s mixture of naivety, knowledge and childlike fear," while the website Zap2It praised Jones' performance as "spot on." She had a small role in Pirates of the Caribbean: On Stranger Tides (2011).

In 2011, Jones made her theatrical debut playing the princess Young Fiona in the original production of Shrek the Musical at the Theatre Royal, Drury Lane. Two years later, Jones appeared in Rebecca Lenkiewicz's stage adaptation of Henry James's The Turn of the Screw as nine-year-old Flora, alternating between two other girls each night. After her performance on press night, Jones said, "I don’t find it scary, I just find it so much fun... I love every bit of it."

In December 2018, it was announced that Jones was cast as Kinsey Locke, one of the main characters in the Netflix fantasy drama series Locke & Key (2020–2022). The first season was released on 7 February 2020. It was Jones' first main role in a television series. She was attracted to the part because of the prospect of playing two versions of the same character: Kinsey before and after she removes her fear.

=== 2020–present: Breakthrough ===
In 2021, Jones starred in the Apple TV+ comedy-drama film CODA as Ruby Rossi, the only hearing member of her family who dreams of going to Berklee. For the part, Jones spent nine months (during production of Locke & Key) learning American Sign Language, while also learning how to operate a professional fishing trawler. Principal photography ran from September 2019 to January 2020. The film premiered on 28 January 2021 at the Sundance Film Festival, where it was bought by Apple Original Films for $25 million. It premiered on Apple TV+ on 13 August 2021 and received positive reviews; Jones and co-star Troy Kotsur were critically acclaimed and received several accolades. The film won the award for Best Picture at the 94th Academy Awards, the first Sundance-premiered film to do so.

Post-CODA, Jones starred in the films Cat Person (2023), Fairyland (2023), and Winner (2024), all of which received lukewarm reviews from critics.

2025 marked another highlight for the actress' career as she was cast in her first blockbuster project: Edgar Wright's adaptation of The Running Man, as well as the first season of HBO's crime drama series Task, the latter garnering her first BAFTA TV Awards nomination for Best Supporting Actress. That same year, she declined to audition for the main role in Supergirl (2026), which ended up being given to Milly Alcock.

Recent projects include the romantic drama Charlie Harper (2025), the sports drama The 99'ers, and the biopic drama Tony.

== Acting credits ==
Key
†	Denotes film or TV productions that have not yet been released

=== Film ===
Year	Title	Role	Notes
2011	Pirates of the Caribbean: On Stranger Tides	English Girl	
2011	One Day	Jasmine	
2014	What We Did on Our Holiday	Lottie	
2015	Youth	Frances	
2015	High-Rise	Vicky	
2016	Brimstone	Joanna	
2018	Ghostland	young Elizabeth "Beth" Keller	
2018	Patrick	Vikki	
2018	Two for Joy	Violet / Vi	
2019	Nuclear	Emma	
2019	Horrible Histories: The Movie – Rotten Romans	Orla	
2021	CODA	Ruby Rossi	
2023	Cat Person	Margot	
2023	Fairyland	Alysia Abbott	
2024	Winner	Reality Winner	
2025	Charlie Harper	Harper	
2025	The Running Man	Amelia Williams	
2026	Tony	Nancy Putkoski	
TBA	The 99'ers †	Julie Foudy	Filming

=== Television ===
Year	Show	Role	Notes
2011	House of Anubis	Young Sarah Frobisher-Smythe	8 episodes
2013	Doctor Who	Merry Gejelh	Episode: "The Rings of Akhaten"
2013–2014	Utopia	Alice Ward	Recurring role
2014	Residue	Charlotte Jones	3 episodes
2015	Wolf Hall	Anne Cromwell	Episode: "Three Card Trick"
2020–2022	Locke & Key	Kinsey Locke	Main cast
2025	Task	Maeve Prendergrast	Main cast

=== Theatre ===
Year	Show	Role	Theatre
2011–2012	Shrek The Musical	Young Fiona	Theatre Royal, Drury Lane
2013	Turn of the Screw	Flora	Almeida Theatre
2014	Far Away	Joan	Young Vic

=== Music videos ===
Year	Artist(s)	Title
2020	JC Stewart	"I Need You to Hate Me"

== Discography ==
=== Soundtracks ===
Title	Album details
Horrible Histories (Original Motion Picture Soundtrack)	Release date: 26 July 2019; Label: Decca, UMG; Formats: Digital download, streaming
CODA (Soundtrack from the Apple Original Film)	Release date: 13 August 2021; Label: Republic, UMG; Formats: Digital download, streaming

=== As main artist ===
Song	Main artist(s)	Writer(s)	Album	Year
"The Long Song"	Emilia Jones (feat. The BBC National Orchestra Of Wales)	Murray Gold	Doctor Who: Series 7 (Original Television Soundtrack)	2013

=== As featured artist ===
Song	Main artist(s)	Writer(s)	Album	Year
"Psycho"	Liam Jessup (as justliam)	Liam Jessup	N/A	2021

=== As songwriter ===
Song	Main artist(s)	Writer(s)	Album	Year
"Through the Phone"	Wild Youth	Conor O’Donohoe; Ed Drewett; Emilia Jones; Pete Hammerton	Forever Girl - EP	2020

== Awards and nominations ==
Year	Award	Category	Work	Result	Ref
2021	Chicago Film Critics Association	Most Promising Performer	CODA	Nominated	
2021	Detroit Film Critics Society	Best Breakthrough Performance	CODA	Nominated	
2021	Gotham Independent Film Awards	Breakthrough Performer	CODA	Won	
2021	Greater Western New York Film Critics Association	Best Actress	CODA	Nominated	
2021	Greater Western New York Film Critics Association	Best Breakthrough Performance	CODA	Nominated	
2021	Indiana Film Journalists Association	Best Actress	CODA	Nominated	
2021	Indiana Film Journalists Association	Breakout of the Year	CODA	Nominated	
2021	Las Vegas Film Critics Society	Best Actress	CODA	Nominated	
2021	Las Vegas Film Critics Society	Youth in Film - Female	CODA	Won	
2021	North Texas Film Critics Association	Best Newcomer	CODA	Nominated	
2021	Online Association of Female Film Critics	Breakthrough Performance	CODA	Nominated	
2021	Utah Film Critics Association	Best Actress	CODA	Won	
2021	Washington D.C. Area Film Critics Association	Best Youth Performance	CODA	Nominated	
2022	Alliance of Women Film Journalists	Best Breakthrough Performance	CODA	Won	
2022	Austin Film Critics Association	Breakthrough Artist Award	CODA	Nominated	
2022	British Academy Film Awards	Best Actress in a Leading Role	CODA	Nominated	
2022	Chicago Indie Critics	Best Actress	CODA	Nominated	
2022	Critics' Choice Movie Awards	Best Young Actor/Actress	CODA	Nominated	
2022	Georgia Film Critics Association	Breakthrough Award	CODA	Nominated	
2022	Hawaii Film Critics Society	Best Actress	CODA	Nominated	
2022	Hollywood Film Critics Association	Best Actress	CODA	Nominated	
2022	Houston Film Critics Society	Best Actress	CODA	Nominated	
2022	London Film Critics' Circle	Young British/Irish Performer	CODA	Nominated	
2022	Minnesota Film Critics Alliance	Best Actress	CODA	Nominated	
2022	Music City Film Critics Association	Best Young Actress	CODA	Won	
2022	North Carolina Film Critics Association	Best Breakthrough Performance	CODA	Nominated	
2022	Online Film and Television Association	Best Youth Performance	CODA	Won	
2022	Online Film and Television Association	Best Female Breakthrough	CODA	Nominated	
2022	San Diego Film Critics Society	Best Actress	CODA	Nominated	
2022	San Diego Film Critics Society	Best Breakthrough Artist	CODA	Won	
2022	Seattle Film Critics Society	Best Youth Performance	CODA	Won	
2026	Astra TV Awards	Best Supporting Actress in a Drama Series	Task	Pending	
2026	British Academy Television Awards	Best Supporting Actress	Task	Pending	
