= Sian Heder =

American writer and filmmaker (born 1977)

- Heder at the 2026 Toronto International Film Festival
- Born: June 23, 1977 (age 49); Cambridge, Massachusetts, U.S.
- Education: Carnegie Mellon University (BFA)
- Occupations: Writer, director, producer
- Years active: 2006–present
- Notable work: Tallulah; CODA; Little America
- Spouse: David Newsom
- Children: 2
- Parents: Mags Harries; Lajos Héder
- Awards: Academy Award for Best Adapted Screenplay; BAFTA Award for Best Adapted Screenplay; Cinema for Peace Dove for Most Valuable Film of the Year

Siân Heder (Note: Pronounced /ˈʃɑːn ˈheɪdər/ shahn hay-dər) (born June 23, 1977) is an American filmmaker who is best known for writing and directing the films Tallulah and CODA. CODA earned Heder the Academy Award for Best Adapted Screenplay and the BAFTA Award for Best Adapted Screenplay. The film also won the Academy Award for Best Picture.

== Early life and education ==
Heder was born in Cambridge, Massachusetts, on June 23, 1977, the daughter of Welsh artist Mags Harries and Hungarian artist Lajos Héder. Her sister, Thyra Heder, is also an artist. Heder graduated with a BFA from the Carnegie Mellon School of Drama.

== Career ==
After graduation, Heder moved to Los Angeles to become an actress and screenwriter while working for a nanny agency. At the agency, she worked for guests with children staying at four-star hotels and her experiences inspired Mother, her first short film as writer and director. In early 2005, the script for Mother was one of eight chosen to be awarded a fellowship for the prestigious American Film Institute's DWW (Directing Workshop for Women). Mother won the Grand Jury Award for "Best Narrative Short" at the Florida Film Festival, and also received honors at the Cinéfondation Competition of the Cannes Film Festival and the Seattle International Film Festival. The film was then selected to appear in competition at Palm Springs International Festival of Shorts and the British Film Institute's London Film Festival.

In 2010, Heder won a Peabody Award, along with her fellow writers, for her work on the acclaimed U.S. television series, Men of a Certain Age. In 2011 she wrote and directed a short comedy, Dog Eat Dog (A Short Tale) starring Zachary Quinto to raise awareness for pet adoption. She wrote for seasons 1-3 of the Netflix original series Orange Is the New Black and wrote and executive produced seasons 1 and 2 of the Apple TV+ series Little America.

In 2015, Heder directed Tallulah, starring Elliot Page and Allison Janney. Tallulah was backed by Route One Entertainment, Maiden Voyages Pictures and Ocean Blue Entertainment and premiered as one of 65 films selected for Sundance Film Festival January 21–31 in Utah. The film received positive reviews from critics, and was released on Netflix on July 29, 2016.

In 2021, Heder's film CODA premiered at the Sundance Film Festival. Apple bought the rights to the film for $25 million. It was released globally on Apple TV+ and in theaters on August 13, 2021. Heder won the Academy Award for Best Adapted Screenplay and the BAFTA Award for Best Adapted Screenplay for her work on the film. The film also received the 2022 Cinema for Peace Dove for The Most Valuable Film of the Year. In 2022, Heder was awarded the AFI’s 30th Annual Franklin J. Schaffner Alumni Medal; the Medal recognizes the creative talents of AFI Conservatory Alumni.

== Personal life ==
Heder is married to actor and producer David Newsom, with whom she has two children.

== Filmography ==
=== Feature film ===
Year	Title	Director	Writer	Producer	Notes
2016	Tallulah	Yes	Yes	No	
2021	CODA	Yes	Yes	No	Academy Award for Best Adapted Screenplay; BAFTA Award for Best Adapted Screenplay; Writers Guild of America Award for Best Adapted Screenplay; Sundance Grand Jury Prize
2026	Being Heumann	Yes	Yes	Yes	

=== Television ===
Year	Title	Director	Writer	Executive producer	Notes
2010	Men of a Certain Age	No	Yes	No	Peabody Award
2013–2018	Orange Is the New Black	Yes	Yes	Co-producer	
2020–2022	Little America	Yes	Yes	Yes	
2023	Barry	No	No	No	Actress (herself) Episode: "It takes a psycho"

== See also ==
- List of female film and television directors
- List of LGBT-related films directed by women
