= Clancy O'Connor =

American actor

- Born: c. 1982 (age 42–43)
- Education: Juilliard School (BFA)
- Occupation: actor
- Years active: 2008–present

Clancy O'Connor is an American actor who played Edward Rutledge in John Adams, a 2008 television miniseries.

He graduated from Smoky Valley High School of Lindsborg, Kansas in 2000, then spent two years at the University of Kansas studying drama. He attended the Juilliard School's drama division as a member of Group 35 (between 2002 and 2006), where he graduated with a Bachelor of Fine Arts degree in 2006.

O'Connor has made television appearances in John Adams, Law & Order: Criminal Intent, I Just Want My Pants Back and Smash.

He was also the understudy for Michael Urie in the Off-Broadway play Buyer & Cellar in 2014.

He is openly gay.

== Filmography ==
Television and Film
Year	Title	Role	Notes
2008	John Adams	Edward Rutledge	(TV Mini-Series), 1 episode: "Independence"
2011	Law & Order: Criminal Intent	Erskine	(TV Series), 1 episode: "Boots on the Ground"
2012	I Just Want My Pants Back	Roger	(TV Series), 2 episodes: "Safety Nets" and "A Piece of Cake"
2012	Smash	Aaron	(TV Series), 1 episode: "Chemistry"
2013	Kill Your Darlings	Tour Guide	(Film)
2014	Unforgettable	Journalist #2	(TV Series), 1 episode: "The Haircut"
2015	Dog Park	Charlie Dunnit	(Web TV Series)
2015	What's Your Emergency	911 Caller (voice role)	(TV Series), 1 episode: "Corporate Hell"
