= Tamar Halpern =

American film director and writer

- Education: University of Southern California (BA, MFA)
- Occupations: Writer, film director
- Known for: Llyn Foulkes One Man Band, Jeremy Fink and the Meaning of Life, Shelf Life
- Children: Jordan Halpern Schwartz

Tamar Halpern is a writer and director living in Los Angeles. She holds an M.F.A. degree from the University of Southern California's School of Cinematic Arts.

== Career ==
Halpern has written and directed ten feature films, including the documentary Llyn Foulkes One Man Band, co-directed with Chris Quilty. Halpern met Foulkes when they were neighbors in Los Angeles, and after becoming friends she cast him in her previous feature film, Your Name Here. Llyn Foulkes One Man Band screened in competition at L.A. Film Festival, had an Oscar qualifying theatrical run, and streamed on Netflix for two years before going to Amazon Prime.

Shot over seven years as Foulkes struggles to find acknowledgement in the international art world, The Hollywood Reporter said, "Foulkes is a joy to watch", and Variety compared the film to Searching for Sugar Man and Cutie and the Boxer. With commentary by Dennis Hopper, Johnny Carson, Paul Schimmel and George Herms, the documentary chronicles the execution of two Foulkes paintings The Lost Frontier (1997-2004) and Deliverance (2004-2007). The film also features extended interviews and musical performances of Foulkes' one-man band contraption called "The Machine".

Previous work includes Jeremy Fink and the Meaning of Life which Halpern adapted from the children's book of the same name by Wendy Mass, starring Mira Sorvino, Joe Pantoliano, Ryan Simpkins, and Michael Urie, with music by Edie Brickell and Sing-Sing. Halpern's feature Shelf Life starred Betsy Brandt of Breaking Bad and was called a "whip-smart film that taps into a fresh source for American comedy" by Variety. Halpern's short comedy Death, Taxes and Apple Juice was invited to 40+ festivals, winning 16 awards including Boston Women in Comedy and L.A. Short Film Festival. Halpern has written and directed five features for Lifetime Network.

Halpern sold her first novel to Diogenes Press in Zurich, which will release in 2023. Called RAD, it is about a teen girl living in the San Fernando Valley and the Bay Area in the 1980’s. Halpern's short story, "The House Where the Grifters Squat," was written during a funded writing residency at Hedgebrook, and was first published in Joyland before winning the Sundress Publications' Best of the Net Award. Halpern is also a contributor to the Huffington Post.

A nominated Film Expert for American Film Showcase and the US Dept. of Education, Halpern has taught directing, screenwriting and documentary filmmaking in Amman, Jordan to locals as well as Syrian refugees and is a visiting screenwriting professor at USC. She has written and directed commercials and digital campaigns for Amazon, DPS, Visa, EventBrite, Pepsi, YSL and Armani, among others, has a background in interactive multimedia and is a founder of the internet startup CitySearch. She holds a BA in Broadcast Journalism and an MFA in Film Production, both from USC. Her son is the composer Jordan Halpern Schwartz and her mother is the artist Abigail Gumbiner.

== Personal life ==
Halpern is Jewish, and her grandfather was a rabbi who marched with Martin Luther King, Jr. and was arrested twice for marching.
