= Emily Robinson =

American actress (born 1998)

- Born: October 18, 1998 (age 28); New York City, U.S.
- Education: Columbia University (BA)
- Occupation: Actress
- Years active: 2007–present
- Height: 1.65 m (5 ft 5 in)
- Partner: Benjamin Gillen (engaged 2024)

Emily Robinson (born October 18, 1998) is an American actress, director and producer.

== Biography ==
Robinson began her career modeling at age six after her neighbor introduced her to Ford Models who then represented her. At the age of seven, Robinson wanted to start acting and taped her first television commercial. Robinson started working in front of a live audience in Saturday Night Live when she was eight. She has since made a total of eight appearances on the show.

In 2010, Robinson made her off-Broadway debut in Horton Foote's epic The Orphans' Home Cycle at the Signature Theatre in New York, directed by Michael Wilson. She played the roles of Lily Dale, Molly and Irma Sue. The Wall Street Journal called the plays, which were performed in repertory, "the most significant theatrical event of the season, the kind of show you tell your grandchildren you saw." A special Drama Desk Award was presented to the cast, creative team and producers.

Robinson continued to work in theatre and has worked with Austin Pendleton, director, A Loss of Roses at the Cherry Lane Theatre, Linda Lavin and James Lecesne in Mother of Invention, and helped create the role of Tessa in Brindlebeast, a new musical by Anita Riggio.

Robinson's television credits include: Transparent (Amazon), Rizzoli & Isles (TNT), Criminal Minds (CBS), Scorpion (CBS), The Following (FOX), CSI: NY (CBS), Person of Interest (CBS), A.N.T. Farm (Disney), Saturday Night Live (NBC), Late Night with Jimmy Fallon (NBC) and The Guiding Light (CBS).

At the age of 17 in 2016, Robinson wrote, directed and starred in the short film, 'Virgin Territory' about a queer teenage girl's sexual awakening.

Also in 2016, Robinson was in "Broken Vows" with Wes Bentley and Jaimie Alexander.

In 2017, Robinson was in "Once Upon a Time in Venice" alongside Jason Momoa, John Goodman and played the role of Taylor, Bruce Willis' niece.

In 2018, alongside Marisa Tomei and Timothy Olyphant, Robinson played the role of Charlie Plummer's love interest in the movie called Dark Was The Night. Robinson and Plummer went to middle school together.

In 2020, Robinson starred in the short film, "Oleander" about a teen girl who creates her own provocative sex-positive YouTube channel. The film won Best Director for Short Film at The Method Fest and was an official selection at the 2020 LA Femme International Film Festival.

Robinson studied creative writing at Columbia University and graduated in 2020.

In December 2024, Robinson got engaged to her boyfriend, Benjamin Gillen, which she later announced on her Instagram on December 16.

In 2026, she directed her first feature length film, Ugly Cry, which she also wrote, produced, and starred in.

== Filmography ==
=== Film ===
Year	Title	Role	Notes
2010	Love Me Tender	Young Emma	Short
2011	A New York Fairy Tale	Nina	Short
2014	The Stowaway	Marilyn	Short
2014	A Day in LA	Emily	Video short
2016	Dreamcatcher	Ann	Short
2016	Virgin Territory	Cassie	Short
2016	Broken Vows	Annie Bloom	
2016	Intervene	J.R.	Short
2017	Crowbar Smile	Marissa	Short
2017	Once Upon a Time in Venice	Taylor	
2017	Unicorn Store	Karen	
2018	Private Life	Charlotte	
2018	Eighth Grade	Olivia	
2018	Dark Was The Night	Tracy	Film previously called Behold My Heart
2020	Oleander	Oleander	Short
2020	Hearsay	Lacey	Short
2022	The Year Between	Carlin Miller	
2023	Edge of Everything	Sarah	
2025	I'm Not Sure	Bridgette	Short
2026	Ugly Cry		Also director, writer, producer
2026	By the Roots	Madison	

=== Television ===
Year	Title	Role	Notes
2007	Guiding Light	Emma	2 episodes
2007–11	Saturday Night Live	Various	Recurring role
2012	Person of Interest	Hanna Frey	Episode: "Bad Code"
2012	CSI: NY	Caroline	Episode: "Late Admissions"
2013	The Following	Parker (age 14)	Episode: "The Fall"
2014	A.N.T. Farm	Oksana	Episode: "UnwANTed"
2014	Scorpion	Megan O'Brien (age 14)	"Pilot", "Single Point of Failure"
2014	Transparent	Ali (age 12)	"The Symbolic Exemplar", "Looking Up", "Best New Girl"
2015	Criminal Minds	Connie Murphy	Episode: "Breath Play"
2015	Rizzoli & Isles	Rachel	Episode: "Imitation Game"
2015–19	Transparent	Young Rose	Recurring role
2016	Girl Meets World	Amy	Episode: "Girl Meets Jexica"
2020	The Blank's YPF	Rachel	Episode: "Week 1"
