= 28th Screen Actors Guild Awards =

- Official poster
- Description: Outstanding motion picture and primetime television performances
- Date: February 27, 2022
- Location: Barker Hangar, Santa Monica, California
- Country: United States
- Presented by: SAG-AFTRA

Highlights
- Most awards: Film; CODA (2); Television; Squid Game (3)
- Most nominations: Film; House of Gucci; The Power of the Dog (3); Television; Succession; Ted Lasso (5)
- Website: www.sagawards.org

Television/radio coverage
- Network: TNT and TBS simultaneous broadcast

The 28th Annual Screen Actors Guild Awards, honoring the best achievements in film and television performances for the year 2021, was presented on February 27, 2022 at the Barker Hangar in Santa Monica, California. The ceremony was broadcast live on both TNT and TBS 8:00 p.m. EST / 5:00 p.m. PST. The nominees were announced on January 12, 2022 by Rosario Dawson and Vanessa Hudgens via Instagram Live.

For film, the deaf/non-hearing cast members that are a part of the ensemble of CODA made history by becoming the first disabled performers to receive a nomination for Outstanding Performance by a Cast in a Motion Picture in the awards' history. Individually for CODA, Troy Kotsur became the first deaf/non-hearing actor to receive an individual SAG Award nomination. For television, Squid Game made history by becoming the first non-English series and first Korean series to be nominated for Outstanding Performance by an Ensemble in a Drama Series. Individually for Squid Game, Lee Jung-jae became the first male actor from Asia and Korea to receive an individual SAG Award nomination and HoYeon Jung became the second actress of Asian as well as Korean descent to do the same. With their respective portrayals of Aretha Franklin in the film Respect and television miniseries Genius: Aretha, Jennifer Hudson and Cynthia Erivo became the first set of actors to be nominated for playing the same role in the same year. For her performance as Anita in Steven Spielberg's West Side Story, Ariana DeBose became the first Afro-Latina and openly queer woman of color to win the Screen Actors Guild Award for Outstanding Performance by a Female Actor in a Supporting Role.

Helen Mirren was announced as the 2021 SAG Life Achievement Award recipient on November 18, 2021.

== Winners and nominees ==
- Note: Winners are listed first and highlighted in **boldface**.

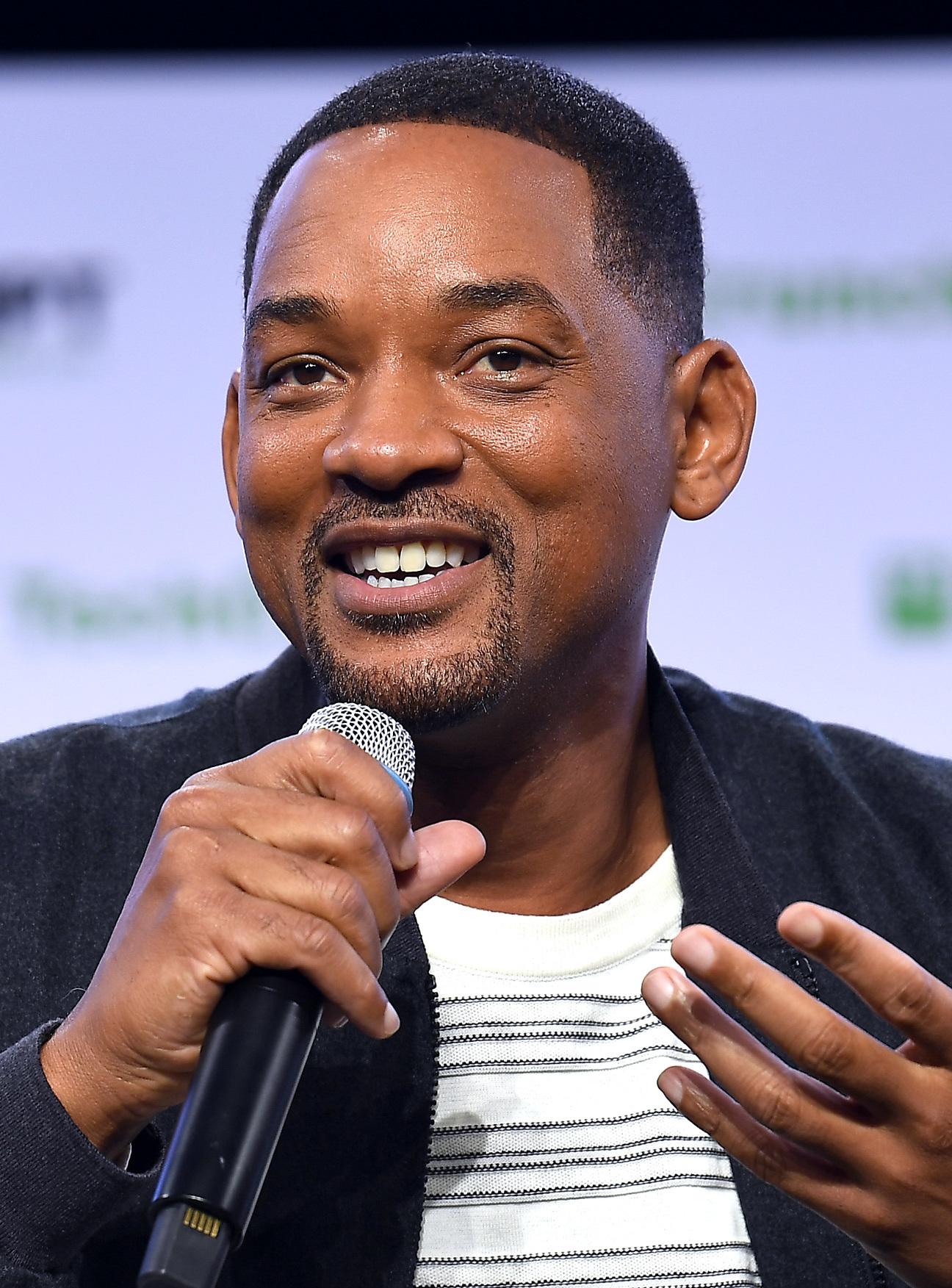
Will Smith, Outstanding Performance by a Male Actor in a Leading Role winner

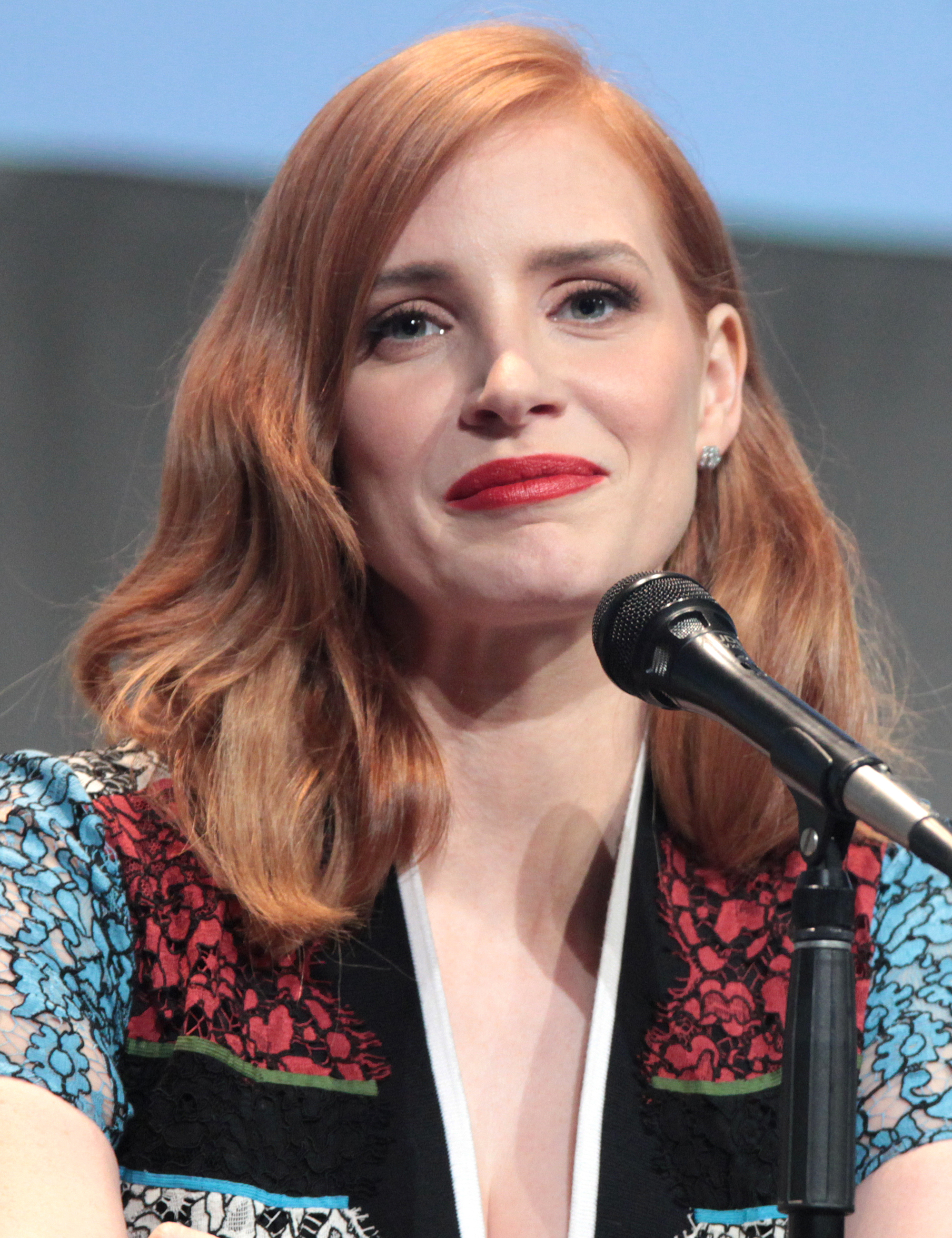
Jessica Chastain, Outstanding Performance by a Female Actor in a Leading Role winner

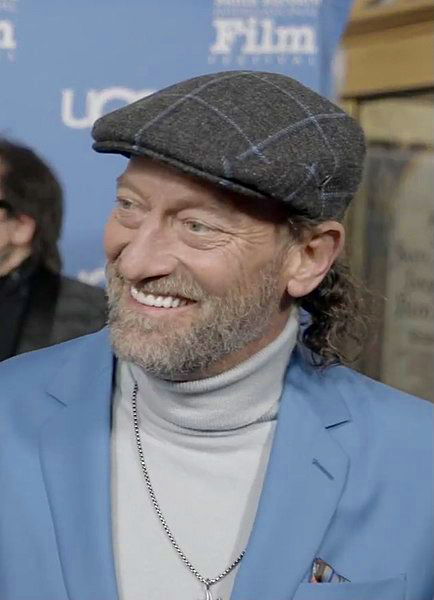
Troy Kotsur, Outstanding Performance by a Male Actor in a Supporting Role winner

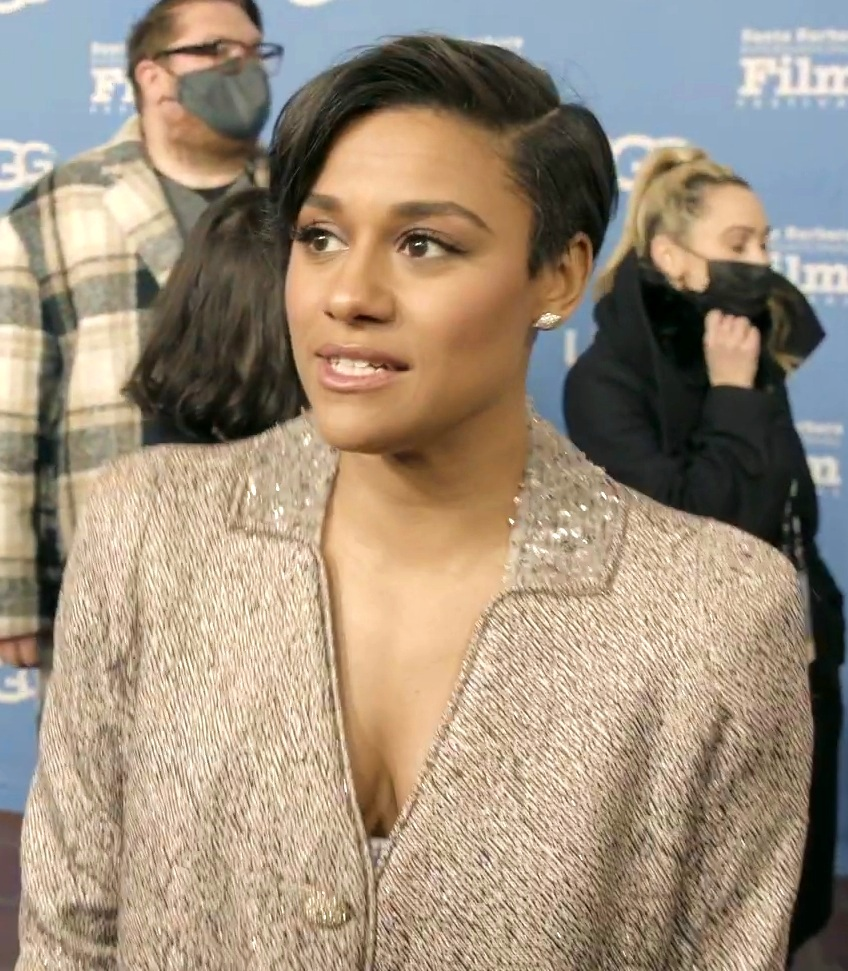
Ariana DeBose, Outstanding Performance by a Female Actor in a Supporting Role winner

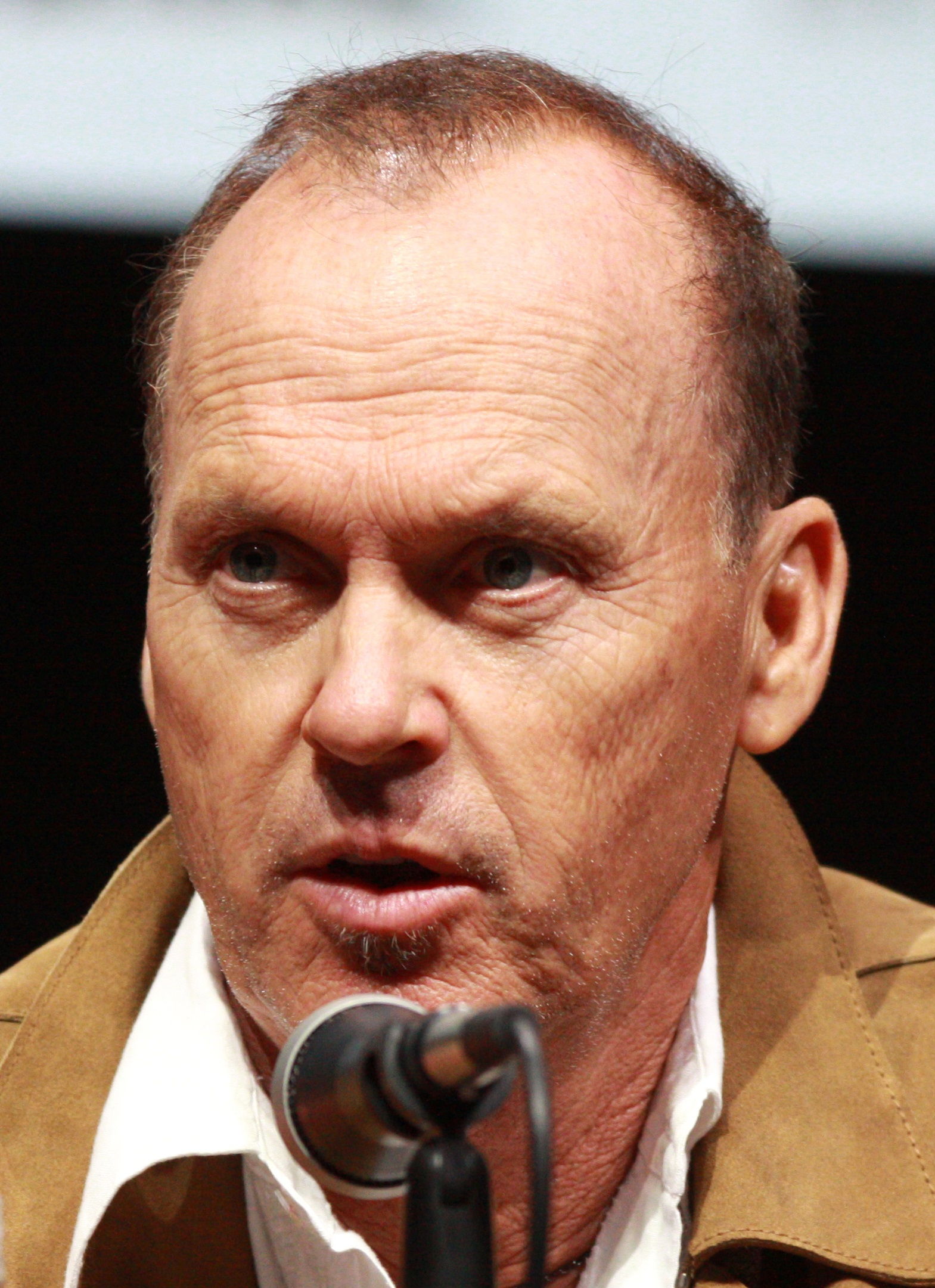
Michael Keaton, Outstanding Performance by a Male Actor in a Television Movie or Limited Series winner

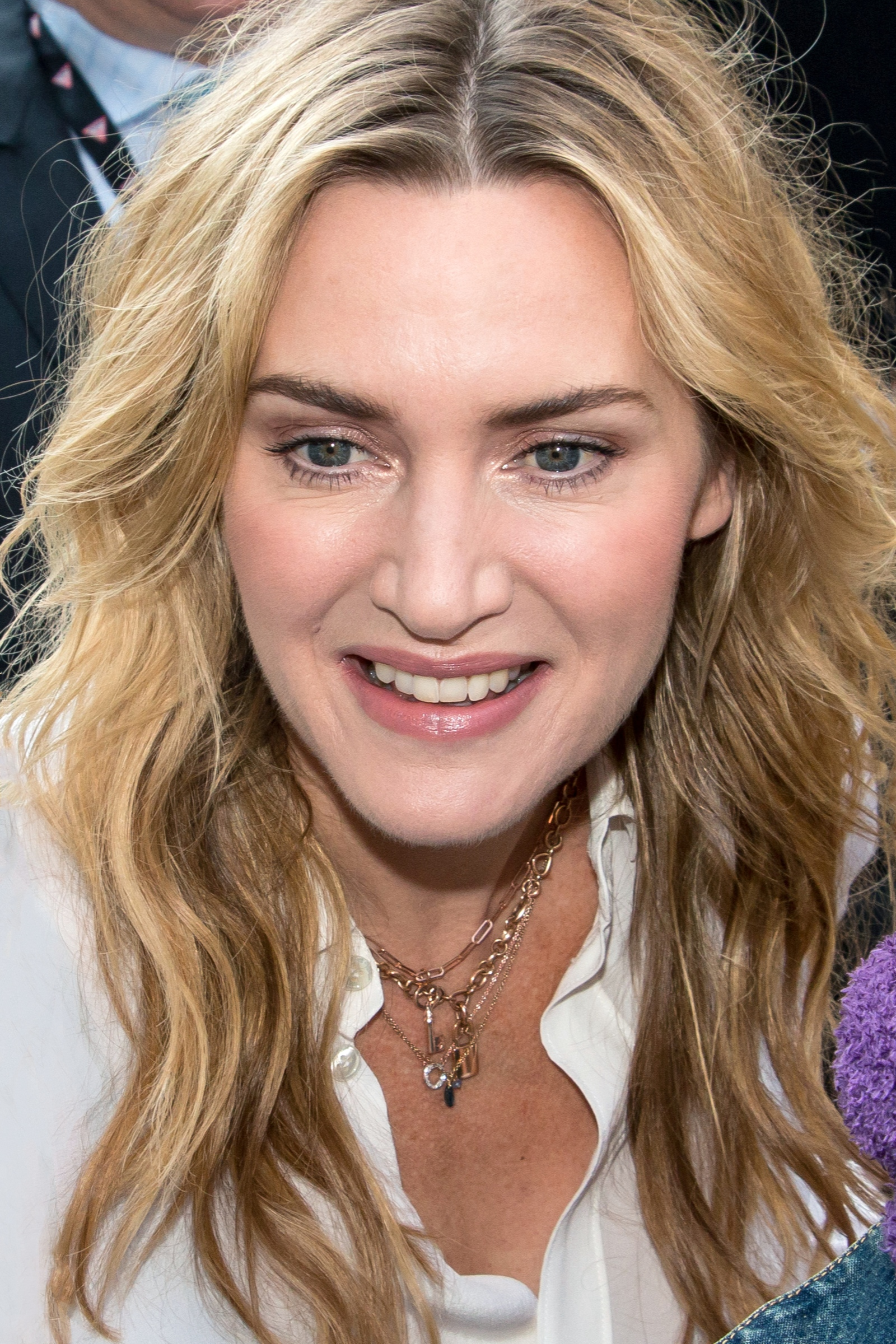
Kate Winslet, Outstanding Performance by a Female Actor in a Television Movie or Limited Series winner

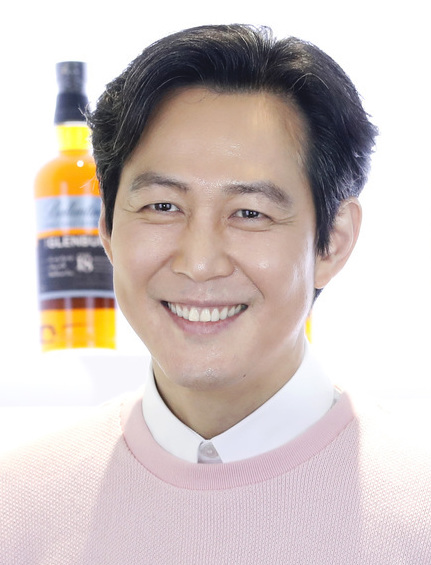
Lee Jung-jae, Outstanding Performance by a Male Actor in a Drama Series winner

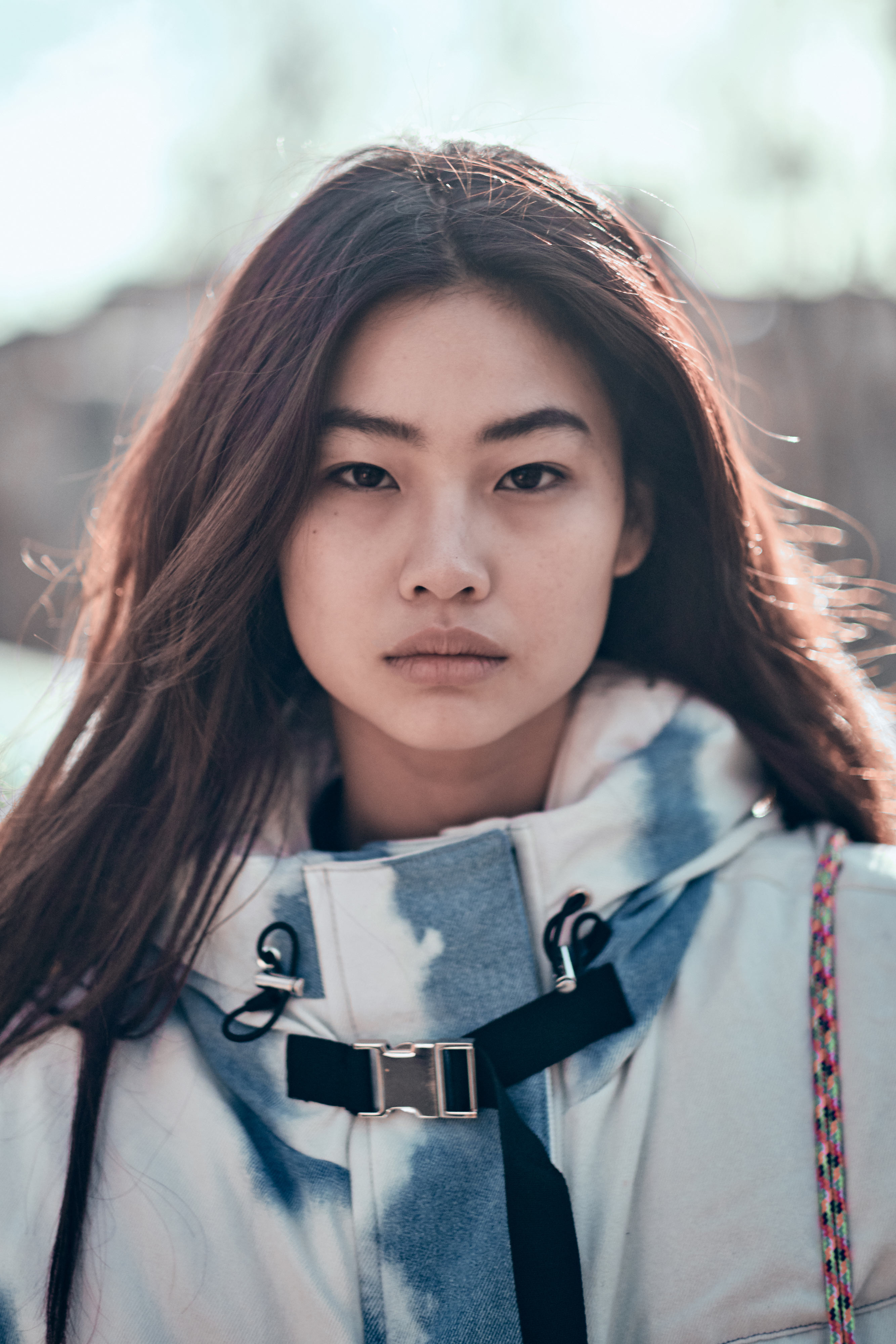
HoYeon Jung, Outstanding Performance by a Female Actor in a Drama Series winner

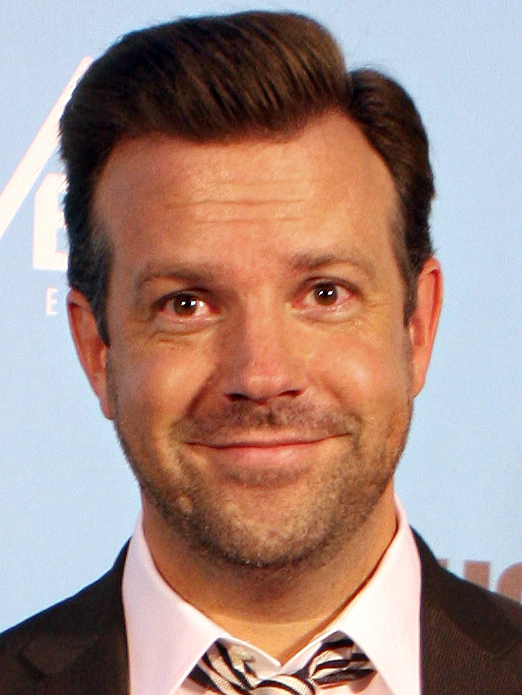
Jason Sudeikis, Outstanding Performance by a Male Actor in a Comedy Series winner

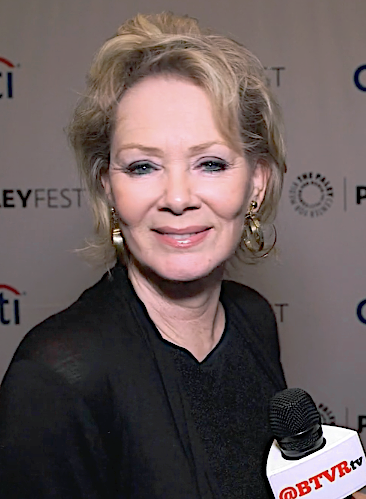
Jean Smart, Outstanding Performance by a Female Actor in a Comedy Series winner

=== Film ===
**Outstanding Performance by a Male Actor in a Leading Role**: **Will Smith – King Richard as Richard Williams**; Javier Bardem – Being the Ricardos as Desi Arnaz; Benedict Cumberbatch – The Power of the Dog as Phil Burbank; Andrew Garfield – tick, tick... BOOM! as Jonathan Larson; Denzel Washington – The Tragedy of Macbeth as Lord Macbeth	**Outstanding Performance by a Female Actor in a Leading Role**: **Jessica Chastain – The Eyes of Tammy Faye as Tammy Faye Bakker**; Olivia Colman – The Lost Daughter as Leda Caruso; Lady Gaga – House of Gucci as Patrizia Reggiani; Jennifer Hudson – Respect as Aretha Franklin; Nicole Kidman – Being the Ricardos as Lucille Ball
**Outstanding Performance by a Male Actor in a Supporting Role**: **Troy Kotsur – CODA as Frank Rossi**; Ben Affleck – The Tender Bar as Charlie Maguire; Bradley Cooper – Licorice Pizza as Jon Peters; Jared Leto – House of Gucci as Paolo Gucci; Kodi Smit-McPhee – The Power of the Dog as Peter Gordon	**Outstanding Performance by a Female Actor in a Supporting Role**: **Ariana DeBose – West Side Story as Anita**; Caitríona Balfe – Belfast as Ma; Cate Blanchett – Nightmare Alley as Dr. Lilith Ritter; Kirsten Dunst – The Power of the Dog as Rose Gordon; Ruth Negga – Passing as Clare Bellew
**Outstanding Performance by a Cast in a Motion Picture**: **CODA – Eugenio Derbez, Daniel Durant, Emilia Jones, Troy Kotsur, Marlee Matlin, and Ferdia Walsh-Peelo**; Belfast – Caitríona Balfe, Judi Dench, Jamie Dornan, Jude Hill, Ciarán Hinds, and Colin Morgan; Don't Look Up – Cate Blanchett, Timothée Chalamet, Leonardo DiCaprio, Ariana Grande, Jonah Hill, Jennifer Lawrence, Melanie Lynskey, Scott Mescudi, Rob Morgan, Himesh Patel, Ron Perlman, Tyler Perry, Mark Rylance, and Meryl Streep; House of Gucci – Adam Driver, Lady Gaga, Salma Hayek, Jack Huston, Jeremy Irons, Jared Leto, and Al Pacino; King Richard – Jon Bernthal, Aunjanue Ellis, Tony Goldwyn, Saniyya Sidney, Demi Singleton, and Will Smith
**Outstanding Performance by a Stunt Ensemble in a Motion Picture**: **No Time to Die**; Black Widow; Dune; The Matrix Resurrections; Shang-Chi and the Legend of the Ten Rings

=== Television ===
**Outstanding Performance by a Male Actor in a Television Movie or Limited Series**: **Michael Keaton – Dopesick (Hulu) as Dr. Samuel Finnix**; Murray Bartlett – The White Lotus (HBO) as Armond; Oscar Isaac – Scenes from a Marriage (HBO) as Jonathan Levy; Ewan McGregor – Halston (Netflix) as Halston; Evan Peters – Mare of Easttown (HBO) as Detective Colin Zabel	**Outstanding Performance by a Female Actor in a Television Movie or Limited Series**: **Kate Winslet – Mare of Easttown (HBO) as Marianne "Mare" Sheehan**; Jennifer Coolidge – The White Lotus (HBO) as Tanya McQuoid; Cynthia Erivo – Genius: Aretha (National Geographic) as Aretha Franklin; Margaret Qualley – Maid (Netflix) as Alexandra "Alex" Russell; Jean Smart – Mare of Easttown (HBO) as Helen Fahey
**Outstanding Performance by a Male Actor in a Drama Series**: **Lee Jung-jae – Squid Game (Netflix) as Seong Gi-hun**; Brian Cox – Succession (HBO) as Logan Roy; Billy Crudup – The Morning Show (Apple TV+) as Cory Ellison; Kieran Culkin – Succession (HBO) as Roman Roy; Jeremy Strong – Succession (HBO) as Kendall Roy	**Outstanding Performance by a Female Actor in a Drama Series**: **Jung Ho-yeon – Squid Game (Netflix) as Kang Sae-byeok**; Jennifer Aniston – The Morning Show (Apple TV+) as Alexandra "Alex" Levy; Elisabeth Moss – The Handmaid's Tale (Hulu) as June Osborne; Sarah Snook – Succession (HBO) as Siobhan "Shiv" Roy; Reese Witherspoon – The Morning Show (Apple TV+) as Bradley Jackson
**Outstanding Performance by a Male Actor in a Comedy Series**: **Jason Sudeikis – Ted Lasso (Apple TV+) as Ted Lasso**; Michael Douglas – The Kominsky Method (Netflix) as Sandy Kominsky; Brett Goldstein – Ted Lasso (Apple TV+) as Roy Kent; Steve Martin – Only Murders in the Building (Hulu) as Charles Haden-Savage; Martin Short – Only Murders in the Building (Hulu) as Oliver Putnam	**Outstanding Performance by a Female Actor in a Comedy Series**: **Jean Smart – Hacks (HBO Max) as Deborah Vance**; Elle Fanning – The Great (Hulu) as Catherine the Great; Sandra Oh – The Chair (Netflix) as Ji-Yoon Kim; Juno Temple – Ted Lasso (Apple TV+) as Keeley Jones; Hannah Waddingham – Ted Lasso (Apple TV+) as Rebecca Welton
**Outstanding Performance by an Ensemble in a Drama Series**: **Succession (HBO) – Nicholas Braun, Juliana Canfield, Brian Cox, Kieran Culkin, Dagmara Domińczyk, Peter Friedman, Jihae, Justine Lupe, Matthew Macfadyen, Dasha Nekrasova, Scott Nicholson, David Rasche, Alan Ruck, J. Smith-Cameron, Sarah Snook, Fisher Stevens, Jeremy Strong, and Zoë Winters**; The Handmaid's Tale (Hulu) – Alexis Bledel, Madeline Brewer, Amanda Brugel, Ann Dowd, O. T. Fagbenle, Joseph Fiennes, Sam Jaeger, Max Minghella, Elisabeth Moss, Yvonne Strahovski, Bradley Whitford, and Samira Wiley; The Morning Show (Apple TV+) – Jennifer Aniston, Shari Belafonte, Eli Bildner, Néstor Carbonell, Steve Carell, Billy Crudup, Mark Duplass, Amber Friendly, Janina Gavankar, Valeria Golino, Tara Karsian, Hannah Leder, Greta Lee, Julianna Margulies, Joe Marinelli, Michelle Meredith, Ruairi O'Connor, Joe Pacheco, Karen Pittman, Victoria Tate, Desean Terry, and Reese Witherspoon; Squid Game (Netflix) – Heo Sung-tae, Jun Young-soo, Jung Ho-yeon, Kim Joo-ryoung, Lee Byung-hun, Lee Jung-jae, Oh Young-Soo, Park Hae-soo, Anupam Tripathi, and Wi Ha-jun; Yellowstone (Paramount Network) – Kelsey Asbille, Wes Bentley, Ryan Bingham, Gil Birmingham, Ian Bohen, Eden Brolin, Kevin Costner, Hugh Dillon, Luke Grimes, Hassie Harrison, Cole Hauser, Jennifer Landon, Finn Little, Brecken Merrill, Will Patton, Piper Perabo, Kelly Reilly, Denim Richards, Taylor Sheridan, Forrie J. Smith, and Jefferson White
**Outstanding Performance by an Ensemble in a Comedy Series**: **Ted Lasso (Apple TV+) – Annette Badland, Kola Bokinni, Phil Dunster, Cristo Fernández, Brett Goldstein, Brendan Hunt, Toheeb Jimoh, Nick Mohammed, Sarah Niles, Jason Sudeikis, Jeremy Swift, Juno Temple, and Hannah Waddingham**; The Great (Hulu) – Julian Barratt, Belinda Bromilow, Sacha Dhawan, Elle Fanning, Phoebe Fox, Bayo Gbadamosi, Adam Godley, Douglas Hodge, Nicholas Hoult, Florence Keith-Roach, Gwilym Lee, and Charity Wakefield; Hacks (HBO Max) – Rose Abdoo, Carl Clemons-Hopkins, Paul W. Downs, Hannah Einbinder, Mark Indelicato, Poppy Liu, Christopher McDonald, Jean Smart, and Megan Stalter; The Kominsky Method (Netflix) – Jenna Lyng Adams, Sarah Baker, Casey Thomas Brown, Michael Douglas, Lisa Edelstein, Ashleigh LaThrop, Emily Osment, Haley Joel Osment, Paul Reiser, Graham Rogers, Melissa Tang, and Kathleen Turner; Only Murders in the Building (Hulu) – Aaron Dominguez, Selena Gomez, Jackie Hoffman, Jayne Houdyshell, Steve Martin, Amy Ryan, and Martin Short
**Outstanding Performance by a Stunt Ensemble in a Television Series**: **Squid Game (Netflix)**; Cobra Kai (Netflix); The Falcon and the Winter Soldier (Disney+); Loki (Disney+); Mare of Easttown (HBO)

=== Screen Actors Guild Life Achievement Award ===
- Helen Mirren

== Multiple nominations ==
=== Film ===
Nominations	Film
3	House of Gucci
3	The Power of the Dog
2	Being the Ricardos
2	Belfast
2	CODA
2	King Richard

=== Television ===
Nominations	Program
5	Succession
5	Ted Lasso
4	Mare of Easttown
4	The Morning Show
4	Squid Game
3	Only Murders in the Building
2	The Great
2	Hacks
2	The Handmaid's Tale
2	The Kominsky Method
2	The White Lotus

== Multiple wins ==
=== Film ===
Wins	Film
2	CODA

=== Television ===
Wins	Program
3	Squid Game
2	Ted Lasso

== In Memoriam ==
The segment, introduced by Maggie Gyllenhaal, was set to the song "Sailboat" by Cody Fry and Ben Rector, and honored the following who died in 2021 and early 2022:

- Ed Asner
- Charlie Robinson
- Bob Saget
- Jane Powell
- Clarence Williams III
- Felix Silla
- Olympia Dukakis
- Lisa Banes
- Howard Hesseman
- Helen McCrory
- Jean-Paul Belmondo
- Arlene Dahl
- Robert Hogan
- Saginaw Grant
- Suzzanne Douglas
- Markie Post
- Gavin MacLeod
- Al Harrington
- Norman Lloyd
- Richard Gilliland
- Michael K. Williams
- Art LaFleur
- Melvin Van Peebles
- Sonny Chiba
- Paul Mooney
- David Gulpilil
- Jackie Mason
- James Hampton
- Sally Kellerman
- Max Julien
- Richard Lee-Sung
- Peter Scolari
- James Michael Tyler
- Jane Withers
- Willie Garson
- Mimi Cozzens
- Walter Olkewicz
- Charles Grodin
- Meat Loaf
- Yvette Mimieux
- Dwayne Hickman
- Frank McRae
- Michael Nesmith
- Stuart Damon
- Frank Bonner
- William Lucking
- Michael Constantine
- Ned Beatty
- Norm Macdonald
- Gaspard Ulliel
- Louie Anderson
- Peter Bogdanovich
- Dean Stockwell
- Betty White
- Sidney Poitier
