= Ryan Simpkins =

American actress (born 1998)

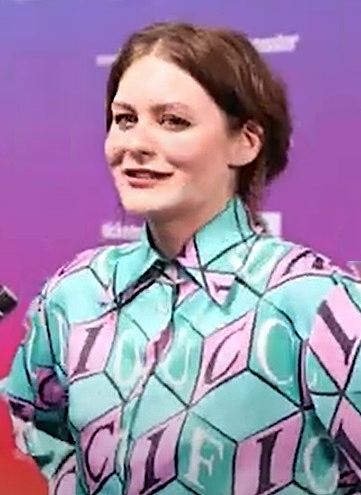
- Simpkins in 2022
- Born: March 25, 1998 (age 28); New York City, U.S.
- Occupation: Actor
- Years active: 2003–present
- Relatives: Ty Simpkins (brother)

External image
- Simpkins at the event for Captain America: Civil War in 2016

Ryan Simpkins (born March 25, 1998) is an American actress, known for her performances in Pride and Glory, A Single Man, Revolutionary Road, and the Fear Street trilogy of films.

== Career ==
Simpkins' first film appearance was in Sherrybaby, playing a lead role opposite Maggie Gyllenhaal. She has performed three times alongside her brother Ty, in Pride and Glory, Revolutionary Road, and Arcadia. She had a lead role as Lizzy Muldoun in the film adaptation of Wendy Mass's book Jeremy Fink and the Meaning of Life, written and directed by Tamar Halpern.

In 2021, she played Alice in the Fear Street trilogy.

In 2025, she starred in the music video for the song "Radioactive Dreams", the first single from the Chat Pile and Hayden Pedigo collaborative album In The Earth Again.

== Personal life ==
Simpkins is non-binary. Though previously having used they/them pronouns, Simpkins uses she/they pronouns as of July 2022.

== Filmography ==
=== Film ===
Year	Title	Role	Notes
2006	Sherrybaby	Alexis Parks	
2006	CSI: Crime Scene Investigation	Faith Waldrip	
2008	Gardens of the Night	Young Leslie Whitehead	
2008	Pride and Glory	Shannon Egan	
2008	Revolutionary Road	Jennifer Wheeler	
2009	Balls Out: The Gary Houseman Story	Amy Daubert	
2009	A Single Man	Jennifer Strunk	
2009	Surveillance	Stephanie	
2010	Sitter Street	Ramona	also writer, director
2011	Jeremy Fink and the Meaning of Life	Lizzy Muldoun	
2011	Twixt	Caroline	
2012	1426 Chelsea Street	Grace	also producer
2012	Arcadia	Greta	
2013	Space Warriors	Lacey Myers	
2015	Anguish	Tess	Nominated – Fangoria Chainsaw Award for Best Actress
2017	Brigsby Bear	Aubrey	
2017	The House	Alex Johansen	
2018	Ladyworld	Dolly	
2021	Fear Street Part One: 1994	Alice	
2021	Fear Street Part Two: 1978	Alice	
2021	Fear Street Part Three: 1666	Alice	
2022	Please Baby Please	Dickie	
2023	Edge of Everything	Caroline	
2024	Beach Logs Kill	Number 36	Short film
2024	The Exorcism	Lee Miller	
2026	Ugly Cry		

=== Television ===
Year	Title	Role	Notes
2020	Wayward Guide for the Untrained Eye	Jewel Irons	Recurring role
2023	Scott Pilgrim Takes Off	Slate Girl	Voice: 2 episodes
