= Pantoliano =

Pantoliano is an Italian surname. Notable people with the surname include:

- Joe Pantoliano (born 1951), American character actor
