= Chalia La Tour =

American actress, performer

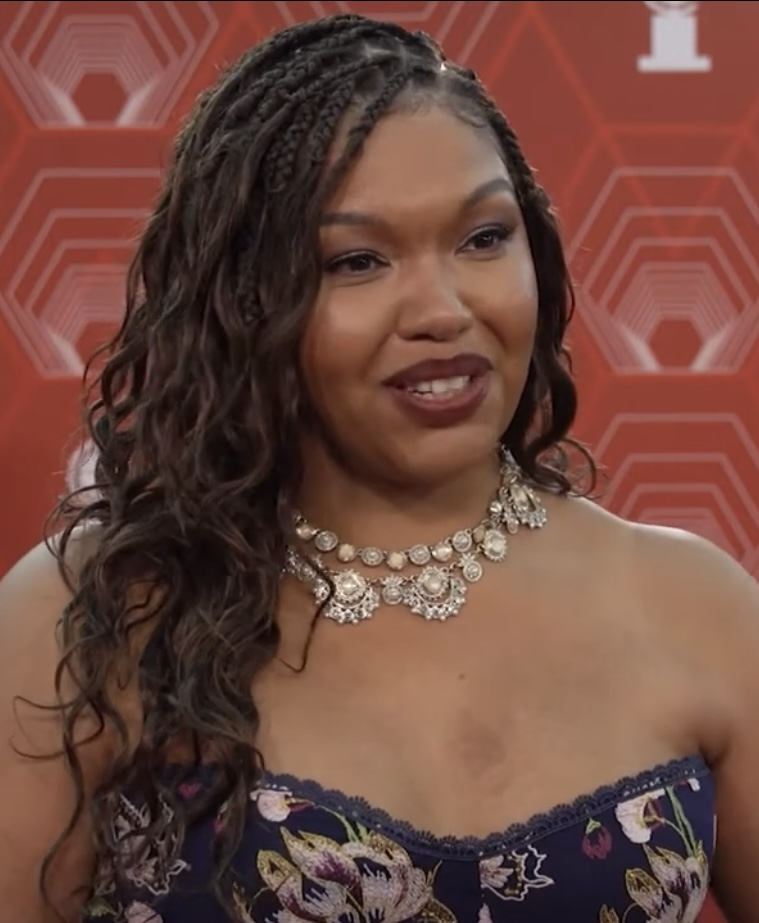
- La Tour in 2021
- Born: January 1, 1988 (age 38); New York City, U.S.
- Education: New York University Tisch School of the Arts; Yale School of Drama
- Occupations: Actor,Performer

Chalia La Tour is an American actress and performer. La Tour was born and raised in New York City and nominated for a Tony Award for Best Featured Actress in a Play in 2020.

== Discography ==
=== Television ===
Year(s)	Title	Role	Notes
2018	The Good Fight	Yesha Mancini	4 episodes
2019	The Code	2nd Lt. Zandra Carter	
2018	Elementary		
	Chicago P.D. (TV series)		
	Law & Order: Special Victims Unit		

=== Film ===
Year(s)	Title	Role	Notes
2015	The Intern		
2017	The Climb		
2017	Deuces (film)		
2017	Understudy	Anna	Short film
2018	The Future Is Bright	Karen	Short film,
2020	Three Pregnant Men	Tanisha	
2020	Love, Repeat	Nicole	
2020	The Last Thing He Wanted (film)		
2022	The Year Between		
2026	Ugly Cry		

=== Theatre credits ===
Year(s)	Title	Role	Notes
2018-	Slave Play	Teá	Tony Award for Best Featured Actress in a Play in 2020
2021-2022	Cadillac Crew	Rachel	Yale Repertory Theatre
2018	The Review, or How to Eat Your Opposition		WP Theater

=== Voice ===
Year(s)	Title	Role	Notes
2018	Pillars of Eternity II: Deadfire	Himuihi/Nairi/Netehe	
