= Michael Urie =

American actor (born 1980)

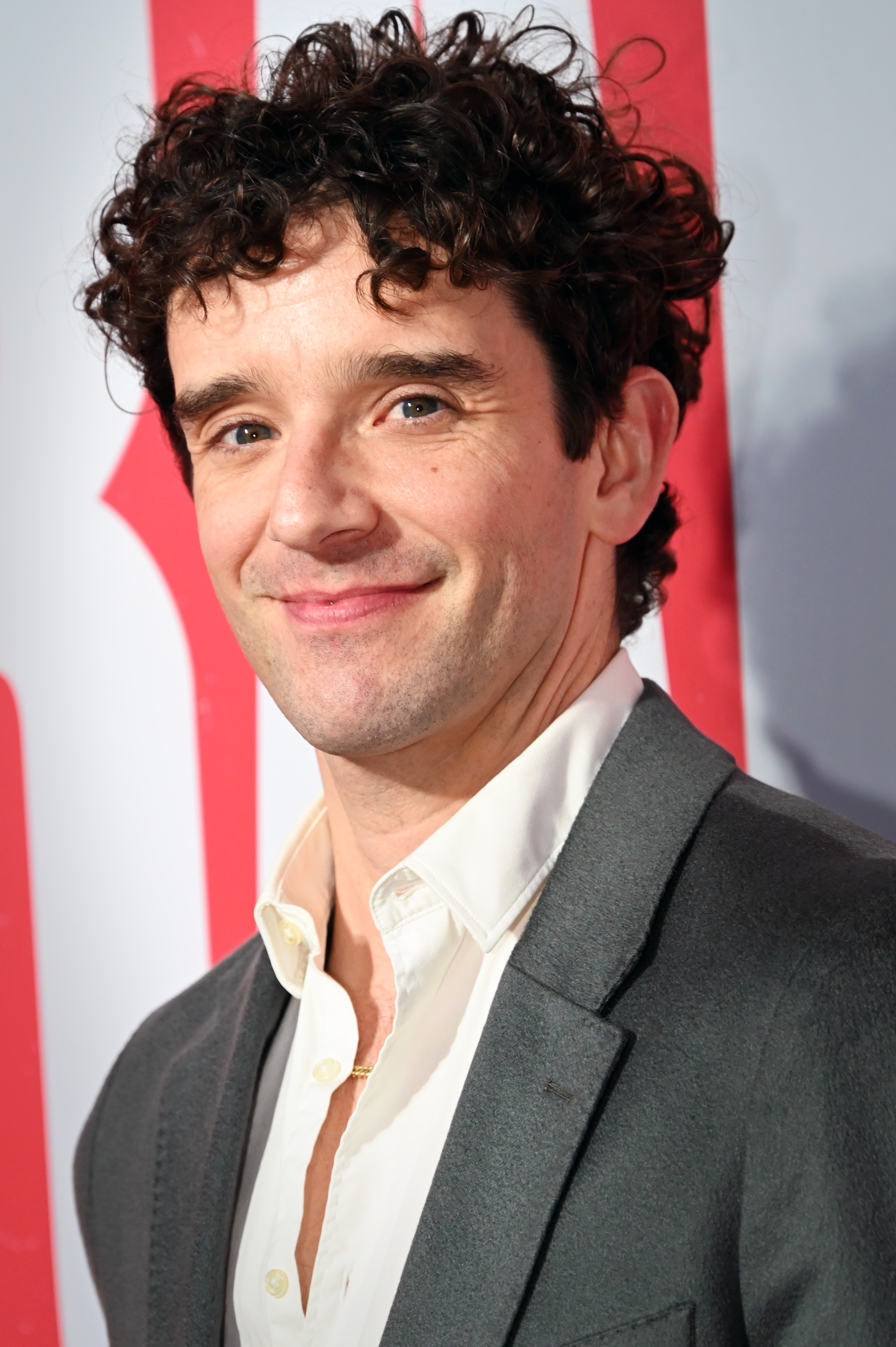
- Urie in 2025
- Born: Michael Lorenzo Urie; August 8, 1980 (age 46); Houston, Texas, U.S.
- Education: Collin College; Juilliard School (BFA)
- Occupation: Actor
- Years active: 1993–present
- Partner: Ryan Spahn (2008–present)

Michael Lorenzo Urie (born August 8, 1980) is an American actor. He is known for his portrayal of Marc St. James on the ABC comedy drama television series Ugly Betty and Brian on the Apple TV+ series Shrinking, a role for which he won a Critics Choice Television Award for Best Supporting Actor and received two consecutive Primetime Emmy Award for Outstanding Supporting Actor in a Comedy Series nominations. He can be heard as Bobby Kerns in As the Curtain Rises, an original podcast soap opera from the Broadway Podcast Network.

== Early life and education ==
Michael Lorenzo Urie was born in Houston, Texas, and raised in Plano. He is of Scottish and Italian descent. He graduated from Plano Senior High School in 1998.

Urie then studied at Collin County Community College before being accepted at the Juilliard School in New York City. While there, he was a member of the Drama Division's Group 32 from 1999 to 2003. Urie graduated from Juilliard in 2003.

== Career ==
Urie, while still a student at Juilliard, performed in the world premiere of Love and Happiness (2001) at the Consolati Performing Arts Center, starring as a sixteen-year-old trying to get rid of his mother's boyfriend. He received the 2002 John Houseman Prize for Excellence in Classical Theatre from the Juilliard School. His classical credits include Shakespeare, Jacobean drama, and commedia dell'arte.

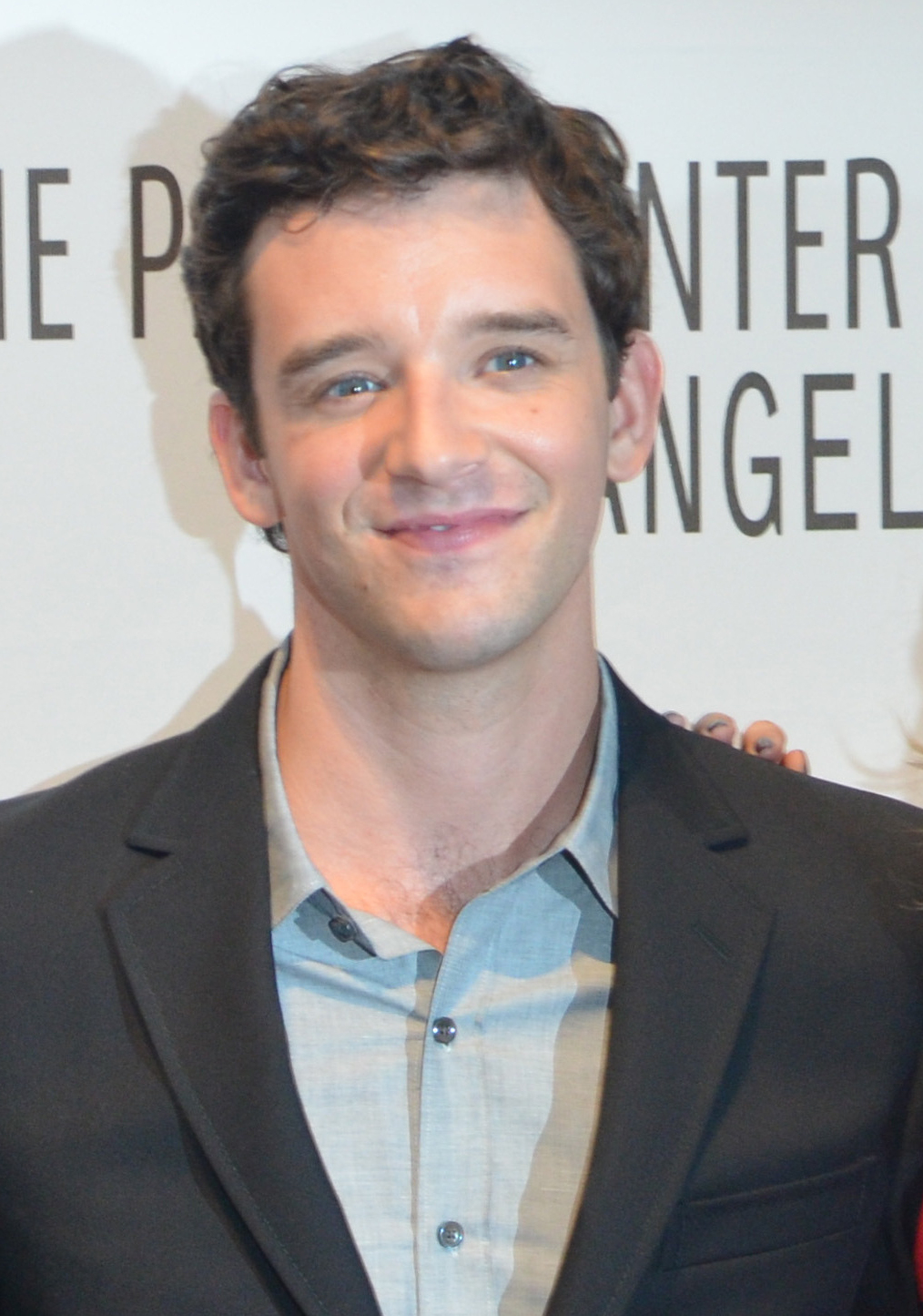
Urie at the 2012 PaleyFest

He is on the board of Plum Productions and serves as its casting director. With the same company he has produced and appeared in Prachtoberfest and lowbrow (and a little bit tacky). As a freelance producer, he has worked on Like The Mountains and The Fantasticks (Four Players Theatre). He also directed the latter production.

In 2006, Urie began appearing in the ABC dramedy Ugly Betty as Marc St. James, the assistant of Wilhelmina Slater, played by Vanessa Williams. The show began with the concept that Wilhelmina would have a different assistant in each episode; thus Urie was originally billed as a guest star in the credits. However, Williams loved their chemistry, and Urie was signed on as a full-time regular midway through the first season. He and the cast were nominated for Screen Actors Guild awards for Outstanding Performance by an Ensemble in a Comedy Series in 2007 and 2008. The role earned Urie a Ewwy Award nomination for Best Supporting Actor in a Comedy Series in 2009. He remained with Ugly Betty until the show's cancellation in 2010.

During the 2007–08 Writers Guild of America strike, Urie hosted TLC's reality-based series Miss America: Reality Check. The program followed the contestants participating in the 2008 Miss America Pageant.

Urie has returned often to his theater roots, including directing a one-night celebrity-performed staging of Howard Ashman's unproduced musical Dreamstuff. The musical was reimagined by Howard's partners Marsha Malamet and Dennis Green and performed at Los Angeles's Hayworth Theatre as part of the Bruno Kirby celebrity reading series. He has also been on Live with Regis and Kelly and has also starred in the 2008 Disney blockbuster production Beverly Hills Chihuahua as the voice of Sebastian.

Urie originated the role of Rudi Gernreich in the 2009 off-Broadway play The Temperamentals, about the foundation of the early LGBT rights organization the Mattachine Society. Urie received a Lucille Lortel Award for Outstanding Lead Actor. In January 2012, Urie made his Broadway debut, joining the cast of the second revival of How to Succeed in Business Without Really Trying in the role of Bud Frump.

He created his own website for videoblogging and live chats. In 2012, Urie also starred as the mysterious limo driver James in the film adaptation of Wendy Mass's children's book Jeremy Fink and the Meaning of Life, written and directed by Tamar Halpern.

Urie was one of the leads in CBS's short-lived series Partners. The multi-camera comedy, from Will & Grace creators Max Mutchnick and David Kohan, centered on lifelong friends and business partners – one straight and one gay. The series premiered on September 24, 2012, but was cancelled after only six episodes had aired.

His performance in 2013's one-man show Buyer & Cellar won him a Clarence Derwent Award as well as a Drama Desk Award for Outstanding Solo Performance.

In April 2015, Urie became the host of Cocktails & Classics on Logo TV, in which he and panels of celebrity friends watch and comment on classic movies while imbibing cocktails named or made for the films. Films profiled on the series have included All About Eve, Steel Magnolias, Valley of the Dolls, Breakfast at Tiffany's, and Mommie Dearest.

In November 2018, Urie starred as Arnold Beckoff in Harvey Fierstein's Torch Song revival on Broadway. He had a recurring role as Redmond, the gossipy book agent, in the TVLand dramedy series Younger, produced by Darren Star.

In 2018, Urie played Prince Hamlet in the Shakespeare Theatre Company's production of Hamlet in Washington, DC. He reprised the role in mid-2019 for the company's "Free for All" production run.

On September 13, 2019, it was announced that Urie would team up with his Ugly Betty co-star Becki Newton on a sitcom project for CBS and Warner Bros. Television called Fun, in which he would both co-star and serve as a co-executive producer with creator Michael Patrick King and fellow Ugly Betty showrunners Tracy Poust and Jon Kinnally. CBS passed on the pilot of the series on May 4, 2020.

In 2021, Urie starred in the Netflix Christmas romantic comedy Single All the Way. In 2023, Urie began starring in the Apple TV+ series Shrinking.

Urie has narrated several audiobooks, including novel Remarkably Bright Creatures by Shelby Van Pelt. Urie narrated the voice of Marcellus, a giant Pacific octopus held captive in a local aquarium. The audiobook was a 2023 finalist for the Audie Awards, which recognizes achievement in audiobook narration.

== Personal life ==
In 2009, Urie referred to himself as "a member of the LGBT community" on his website. In a 2010 interview with The Advocate, he said that he was in a relationship with a man and is queer. He said it never felt wrong when he was with women previously. Since 2008, he has been in a relationship with actor and writer Ryan Spahn.

== Filmography ==
=== Film ===
Year	Title	Role	Notes
2005	WTC View	Eric	
2008	Beverly Hills Chihuahua	Sebastian	Voice
2011	The Decoy Bride	Steve Korbitz	
2011	Jeremy Fink and the Meaning of Life	James	
2012	Petunia	George McDougal	
2013	He's Way More Famous Than You	Himself	
2014	Such Good People	Richard Nearly	
2019	Lavender	Arthur	Short film
2020	Nora Highland	Gala Host	
2020	Smithtown	Ian Bernstein	
2021	The Extinction of Fireflies	Jay	
2021	Swan Song	Dustin	
2021	Single All the Way	Peter	
2023	Summoning Sylvia	Jamie	
2023	Maestro	Jerome Robbins	
2024	Goodrich	Terry	

=== Television ===
Year	Title	Role	Notes
2002	Undressed	Justin	Episode: "Tangled Beards"
2004	Kat Plus One	Roger	Television film
2006–2010	Ugly Betty	Marc St. James	Main role
2008–2009	Mode After Hours	Marc St. James	Main role
2010	Popatron	Himself	Episode: "1.2"
2010	Brain Trust	Prof. Franklin Gordon	Television film
2010	Celebrity Ghost Stories	Himself	Episode: "2.4"
2012	Submissions Only	Zach Blumenkrantz	Episode: "Y'all Were Great!"
2012–2013	Partners	Louis McManus	Main role
2013	It Could Be Worse	Mike	Episode: "I Need Help"
2013	Hot in Cleveland	Jeffery	Episode: "Cleveland Indians"
2014	Modern Family	Gavin Sinclair	2 episodes
2014–2016	The Good Wife	Stephen Dinovera	4 episodes
2015	RuPaul's Drag Race	Himself	Episode: "Snatch Game"
2015	Workaholics	Joey	Episode: "Gayborhood"
2016	Almost Royal	Himself	Episode: "Romance"
2016–2021	Younger	Redmond	Recurring role (seasons 2–7)
2018	After Forever	Daniel	2 episodes
2019	The Good Fight	Stephen Dinovera	2 episodes
2019–2020	Almost Family	Nate	3 episodes
2020	Ms. Guidance	Brant Finklestein	Episode: "The Taming of the Jenny"
2021	The Bite	Josh	3 episodes
2023–present	Shrinking	Brian	Main role
2023	American Dad!	Mark Zuckerberg / Student (voice)	2 episodes
2023–2025	Krapopolis	Hermes (voice)	12 episodes
2025	Night Court	Toby Nulman	Episode: "Funnest Judge in the City"
2026	Elsbeth	Monty Blakemont III	Episode: "That's All"

=== Director and executive producer ===
Year	Title	Role	Notes
2009	House of Kai Milla	Executive producer	Television film
2012	He's Way More Famous Than You	Director	
2012	Thank You for Judging	Co-director; executive producer	Documentary

== Theater ==
Year	Title	Role	Venue	Notes
2009-2010	The Temperamentals	Rudi Gernreich	New World Stages	Off-Broadway
2010	Angels in America	Prior Walter	Signature Theatre Company	Off-Broadway
2011	The Cherry Orchard	Yepikhodov	Classic Stage Company	Off-Broadway
2012	How to Succeed in Business Without Really Trying	Bud Frump	Al Hirschfeld Theatre	Broadway replacement
2013	Buyer & Cellar	Alex More	Barrow Street Theatre	Off-Broadway
2014	Buyer & Cellar	Alex More	Various	National Tour
2015	Buyer & Cellar	Alex More	Menier Chocolate Factory	Off West End
2015	A Funny Thing Happened on the Way to the Forum	Hysterium	Two River Theater	Red Bank, New Jersey
2015	Shows for Days	Car	Mitzi E. Newhouse Theater	Off-Broadway
2016	Homos, Or Everyone in America	The Writer	LAByrinth Theater Company	Off-Broadway
2017	The Government Inspector	Ivan Alexandreyevich Hlestakov	The Duke on 42nd Street	Off-Broadway
2017	Torch Song	Arnold Beckoff	Second Stage Theater	Off-Broadway
2018	Hamlet	Hamlet	Shakespeare Theatre Company	Washington, D.C.
2018	How to Succeed in Business Without Really Trying	Bud Frump	Kennedy Center	Washington, D.C.
2018–2019	Torch Song	Arnold Beckoff	Hayes Theater	Broadway
2019	High Button Shoes	Harrison Floy	New York City Center	Encores!
2019	A Bright Room Called Day	Gregor	The Public Theater	Off-Broadway
2020	Grand Horizons	Brian	Hayes Theater	Broadway
2021	Chicken & Biscuits	Logan Leibowitz	Circle in the Square Theatre	Broadway
2022	Jane Anger	William Shakespeare	Shakespeare Theatre Company	Washington, D.C.
2023	The Da Vinci Code	Robert Langdon	Ogunquit Playhouse	Regional
2023	Spamalot	Sir Robin / Guard 1 / Brother Maynard	Kennedy Center	Washington, D.C.
2023	Gutenberg! The Musical!	The Producer (one-night cameo)	James Earl Jones Theatre	Broadway
2023–2024	Spamalot	Sir Robin / Guard 1 / Brother Maynard	St. James Theatre	Broadway
2024	Once Upon a Mattress	Prince Dauntless	New York City Center	Encores!
2024	Once Upon a Mattress	Prince Dauntless	Hudson Theatre	Broadway
2024–2025	Once Upon a Mattress	Prince Dauntless	Ahmanson Theatre	Los Angeles
2025	Oh, Mary!	Mary's Teacher	Lyceum Theatre	Broadway
2025	Richard II	King Richard II	Astor Place Theatre	Off-Broadway
2026	Oh, Mary!	Mary's Teacher	Trafalgar Theatre	West End replacement

== Awards and nominations ==
Year	Award	Category	Work	Result	Ref.
2006	Screen Actors Guild Award	Outstanding Performance by an Ensemble in a Comedy Series	Ugly Betty	Nominated	
2007	Screen Actors Guild Award	Outstanding Performance by an Ensemble in a Comedy Series	Ugly Betty	Nominated	
2007	Gold Derby Award	Ensemble of the Year	Ugly Betty	Nominated	
2008	Teen Choice Award	Choice TV Actor Comedy	Ugly Betty	Nominated	
2009	Teen Choice Award	Choice TV Fab-u-lous	Ugly Betty	Nominated	
2009	Teen Choice Award	Choice TV Sidekick	Ugly Betty	Nominated	
2009	Webby Award	Best Performance - Webisodes	Mode After Hours	Nominated	
2010	Drama Desk Award	Outstanding Ensemble Performance	The Temperamentals	Won	
2010	Lucille Lortel Award	Outstanding Lead Actor in a Play	The Temperamentals	Won	
2010	Theatre World Award	Outstanding Debut Performance	The Temperamentals	Won	
2011	Williamsburg Independent Film Fest	Best Documentary	Thank You for Judging	Won	
2013	Cleveland International Film Festival	Best American Independent Feature Film	He's Way More Famous Than You	Nominated	
2013	Slamdance Film Festival	Best Narrative Feature	He's Way More Famous Than You	Nominated	
2013	Dallas International Film Festival	Narrative Feature Competition	He's Way More Famous Than You	Nominated	
2013	Drama Desk Award	Outstanding Solo Performance	Buyer & Cellar	Won	
2013	Outer Critics Circle Award	Outstanding Solo Performance	Buyer & Cellar	Nominated	
2014	Nantucket Film Festival	Best Short Film	The Hyperglot	Won	
2014	Friars Club Comedy Film Fest	Best Short	The Hyperglot	Won	
2014	Berlin International Film Festival	Short Film	The Hyperglot	Won	
2015	Cleveland International Film Festival	Best Live Action Comedy Short Film	The Hyperglot	Honorable mention	
2015	San Joaquin International Film Festival	Best Film	The Hyperglot	Won	
2018	International Academy of Web Television	Best Ensemble Performance (Drama)	After Forever	Nominated	
2018	Los Angeles Independent Film Festival	Best Short Film Ensemble	After Forever	Won	
2018	Outer Critics Circle Award	Outstanding Actor in a Play	The Government Inspector	Nominated	
2019	Lucille Lortel Award	Outstanding Lead Actor in a Play	Torch Song	Nominated	
2021	New Media Film Festival	Festival Award	After Forever	Nominated	
2021	OUT at the Movies International LGBT Film Festival	Best Performance in a Supporting Role	Nora Highland, Swan Song and The Extinction of Fireflies	Won	
2025	Screen Actors Guild Award	Outstanding Performance by an Ensemble in a Comedy Series	Shrinking	Nominated	
2025	Primetime Emmy Awards	Outstanding Supporting Actor in a Comedy Series	Shrinking	Nominated	
2025	Critics' Choice Award	Best Supporting Actor in a Comedy Series	Shrinking	Won	
2025	Astra TV Awards	Best Supporting Actor in a Comedy Series	Shrinking	Nominated	
2025	Drama Desk Award	Outstanding Featured Performance in a Musical	Once Upon a Mattress	Won	
2025	Outer Critics Circle Award	Outstanding Featured Performer in a Broadway Musical	Once Upon a Mattress	Nominated	
2026	Primetime Emmy Awards	Outstanding Supporting Actor in a Comedy Series	Shrinking	Nominated	
