= The Temperamentals =

2009 play by Jon Marans

- Theatrical poster
- Original language: English
- Written by: Jon Marans
- Characters: Harry Hay; Rudi Gernreich; Bob Hull; Chuck Rowland; Dale Jennings
- Setting: Los Angeles, California

Premiere
- Date: April 30, 2009
- Place: Barrow Group Studio Theater

The Temperamentals is a 2009 play by Jon Marans. It chronicles the founding of the Mattachine Society, the first sustained LGBT rights organization in the United States, and the love affair of two of its founding members, Harry Hay (Thomas Jay Ryan) and Rudi Gernreich (Michael Urie). The title is drawn from the early-20th Century usage of the word "temperamental" as slang for "homosexual". After premiering at The Barrow Group Studio Theater in April 2009, the play began previews off-Broadway at New World Stages on February 18, 2010 and premiered February 28. Producers Darryl Roth and Stacy Shane announced that The Temperamentals would close May 30. "We began our wonderful journey in April 2009 and are very grateful for the awards, honors, nominations and recognition that we have received and are receiving the end of this theater season. We would like to leave on a high note."

== Critical reception ==
The New York Times gave The Temperamentals a good review, calling it an "eminently likable docudrama".

The Temperamentals received a Drama Desk Award for Best Ensemble Cast. Michael Urie, who originated the role of Rudi Gernreich, received a Lucille Lortel Award for Outstanding Lead Actor.

== Film adaptation ==
As of 2022 The Temperamentals is in film development with Daryl Roth Productions.
