= Buyer & Cellar =

2013 one-man comedic play

- Original language: English
- Written by: Jonathan Tolins

Premiere
- Date: April 2, 2013
- Place: Rattlestick Playwrights Theater, New York City

Buyer & Cellar is a 2013 American one-man play by Jonathan Tolins.

== Plot summary ==
The play is a one-man comedy that follows Alex More, a struggling gay actor working in Los Angeles, who is down on his luck after being recently fired from Disneyland. He lands a job curating the Malibu basement of Barbra Streisand. (The real-life Streisand constructed a series of "Main Street" storefronts beneath her Malibu barn inspired by the Winterthur Museum in Delaware in order to house her collection of dolls and other trinkets). More at first does not meet his employer, but eventually Streisand comes down to peruse her collection, and the two strike up a friendly relationship. The play chronicles the fictional exchanges between More and his idol, the source of both admiration and frustration on More's part. The entire play is narrated from More's point of view and is presented as a story told to his screenwriter boyfriend Barry.

== Performance history ==
The play premiered at the Rattlestick Playwrights Theater in New York City on April 2, 2013. The production starred Michael Urie and was directed by Stephen Brackett. The same production then opened off-Broadway at the Barrow Street Theatre on June 24, 2013, closing in 2014. Urie won a Clarence Derwent Award for his performance as well as a Drama Desk Award for Outstanding Solo Performance. Clancy O'Connor was Urie's understudy. The production subsequently transferred to London at the Menier Chocolate Factory, Off West End from March 12 to May 2, 2015, with Urie reprising his performance.

The show was performed and live-streamed by Michael Urie on April 19, 2020. In France, Julien Baptist performed the show in December 2013. In London, Aaron Sidwell performed the show in October 2020.

A new London production directed by Kirk Jameson opened at the King's Head Theatre, starring Rob Madge as Alex running from September 18 to October 19, 2024, before transferring to The Drum at Theatre Royal, Plymouth from October 29 to November 3, 2024.

== Awards and nominations ==
=== 2013 Off-Broadway production ===
Year	Award	Category	Nominee	Result	Ref.
2013	Drama Desk Award	Outstanding Solo Performance	Michael Urie	Won	
2013	Outer Critics Circle Award	Outstanding Solo Performance	Michael Urie	Nominated	
2014	BroadwayWorld Award	Best Off-Broadway Play	Buyer & Cellar	Won	
2014	Lucille Lortel Award	Outstanding Solo Show	Michael Urie	Won	
