= 11 Birthdays =

2009 children's time loop novel by Wendy Mass

- Author: Wendy Mass
- Cover artist: Digital Vision (RF)/Getty Images, Digital rendering by Joe Zeff and Michael Frost, Cover design by Lillie Mear
- Language: English
- Series: Willow Falls
- Subject: Birthdays, Friendship, Time Loops, Magic
- Genre: Fantasy, Realistic Fiction
- Published: 2009
- Publisher: Scholastic Press
- Publication place: United States
- Media type: Print
- Pages: 272
- Awards: William Allen White Award, and a 2009 Library Guild Selection
- ISBN: 978-0-545-05239-9
- Followed by: Finally

11 Birthdays is a children's time loop novel written by Wendy Mass and published in 2009 by Scholastic Press. It is the first novel in the Willow Falls series.

The novel follows the life of a young girl named Amanda Ellerby who has spent each of her first ten birthdays with the same boy, her best friend Leonard "Leo" Fitzpatrick, who will later become her boyfriend, then much later husband. With her 11th birthday fast approaching, a falling out between the two friends has caused a shift in this birthday tradition leading to consequences both of them never could have imagined. Chosen as a 2009 Library Guild Selection, this novel has been the recipient of various nominations and awards across the country.

== Reception ==
11 Birthdays, was positively received by both the general public and critics. The Bulletin of the Center for Children's Books published a review by Jeannette Hulick, which states that 11 Birthdays “is imaginatively developed and kid-pleasing. The now-tenuous/now-tenacious quality of the book’s middle-grade friendships will ring true to its audience, and Amanda’s voice is likable and humorous.” Publishers Weekly also states, “Like a Groundhog Day for middle grade readers, Mass' winning story features a girl seemingly trapped in her 11th birthday. Amanda seems doomed to relive her failed try-out for the gymnastics team, her mother being fired from her job and, worst of all, the party that even her best friend leaves early—to go to the party hosted by her former friend, Leo. The two have celebrated every previous birthday together (they were born on the same day), but a misunderstanding on their 10th has gone unresolved. Girls will relate to Amanda’s insecurities, and the confidence and insights she gains will resonate with them. Mass’s expertise with pacing keeps the story moving at a lively clip, and her understanding of this age group is as finely honed as ever.” 11 Birthdays has been nominated for and received numerous awards, including the William Allen White Award for grades 3–5 in 2012, and has been chosen a 2009 Library Guild Selection. It received the 2012 Young Hoosier Book Award (Intermediate).

== Willow Falls ==
The five novels of the Willow Falls series all have different protagonists, who become friends. They also all revolve around birthdays and are set in the same small town of Willow Falls, with the presence of the mysterious Angelina D’Angelo.

- 11 Birthdays (2009)
- 12 Finally (2010) Rory Swenson has a list of things she wants to do once she turns 12, but after a cryptic prediction from Angelina, most of her attempts to get them end in disaster.
- 13 Gifts (2011) As punishment for stealing a stuffed goat, Tara Brennan is sent to her aunt and uncle in Willow Falls, where after she attempts to sell a stolen vintage comic book, Angelina orders her to gather 13 things by her 13th birthday.
- The Last Present (2013) Grace Kelly enters a frozen state on her 10th birthday, which could have been avoided if Angelina had been able to give her a protective blessing. Amanda and Leo's curse is changed to allow them to travel back in time to Grace's birthdays to give her that blessing, until they find out what she really needs.
- Graceful (2015) Still adjusting to life with her powers, Grace discovers something big in Willow Falls' future, and it's connected to the strange things happening in town.
