= By the Roots =

2026 American drama film

- Directed by: Madison Young
- Written by: Madison Young
- Produced by: Madison Young; Laura Wagner
- Starring: Emily Robinson; Brant Daugherty; Ally Sheedy; Margaret Cho; Brittany Blum; Nessa Dougherty; Briar Magee
- Cinematography: Laura Valladao
- Edited by: Gwen Park
- Music by: Corey J. Brewer
- Production companies: Empress In Lavender Media; Boycott Entertainment; Bay Bridge Productions; Capsaicinco
- Release date: April 18, 2026 (Beverly Hills Film Festival)
- Running time: 111 minutes
- Country: United States
- Language: English

By the Roots is a 2026 American autobiographical drama film written and directed by Madison Young. Based on Young's 2014 memoir Daddy, the film stars Emily Robinson, Brant Daugherty, Nessa Dougherty, Briar Magee, Brittany Blum, Ally Sheedy, and Margaret Cho.

The film premiered as the closing night feature film at the 2026 Beverly Hills Film Festival on April 18, 2026.

== Premise ==
Queer San Francisco gallerist and sexual revolutionary Madison returns to her conservative Ohio hometown with her dominant partner, James, to confront the past. Told through a non-linear narrative spanning her childhood, adolescence, and adulthood, the film explores the experiences that shaped her identity and led her to leave home.

== Cast ==
- Emily Robinson as Madison
  - Nessa Dougherty as child Tina
  - Briar Magee as teenage Tina
- Brant Daugherty as James
- Ally Sheedy as Barbara Heisler
- Margaret Cho as Janine Sorrel
- Brittany Blum as Gail
- Josephine Chiang as Blake
- Jiz Lee as Gauge
- Casey Calvert as Christa
- King Lotus Boy as Baz
- Alotta Boutte as Angel
- Lea Robinson as Frankie
- Bunny Michael as Tricia

== Production ==
In July 2022, it was announced that Young was adapting their memoir, Daddy, into a feature film screenplay. Principal photography concluded in February 2025 after seven months of filming in San Francisco, Oakland, Brooklyn, and Kingston, New York.

== Release ==
The film had its world premiere at the Beverly Hills Film Festival on April 18, 2026 as the closing night feature film of the festival. Emily Robinson received the festival's Best Actress award for her performance as Madison.
