= Joe Pantoliano =

American actor (born 1951)

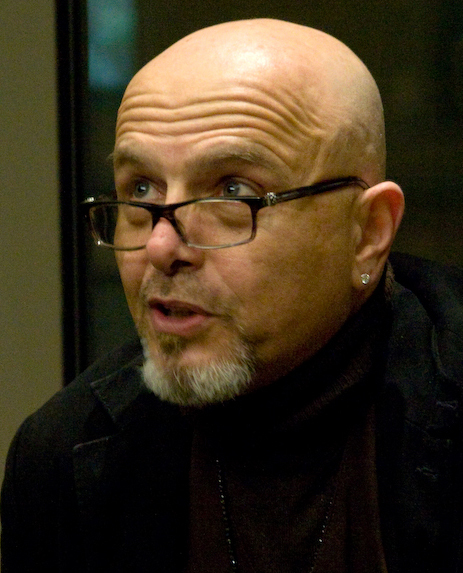
- Pantoliano in 2009
- Born: Joseph Peter Pantoliano; September 12, 1951 (age 75); Hoboken, New Jersey, U.S.
- Other name: Joey Pants
- Occupation: Actor
- Years active: 1974–present
- Spouses: Morgan Kester (m. 1979; div. 1985); Nancy Sheppard (m. 1994)
- Children: 4

Joseph Peter Pantoliano (born September 12, 1951) is an American actor who has played more than 150 roles across film, television, and theater. He won an Emmy for his portrayal of the sadistic gangster Ralph Cifaretto in HBO's The Sopranos. His film roles include Francis Fratelli in The Goonies (1985), Captain Conrad Howard in the Bad Boys film series (1995–2024), Cypher in the Wachowskis' sci-fi action film The Matrix (1999), and Teddy in Christopher Nolan's psychological thriller film Memento (2000).

Other notable film credits include Risky Business (1983), Empire of the Sun (1987), La Bamba (1987), Midnight Run (1988), The Fugitive (1993), Baby's Day Out (1994), the Wachowskis' directorial debut Bound (1996), and Percy Jackson & the Olympians: The Lightning Thief (2010). In 2025, he received a Primetime Emmy Award nomination for Outstanding Guest Actor in a Drama Series for his performance in The Last of Us.

Pantoliano has published two memoirs and is active in the field of mental health, having documented his mother's issues and his own. He founded the nonprofit No Kidding, Me Too! which is dedicated to removing the stigma from mental illness.

== Early life ==
Joseph Peter Pantoliano was born in Hoboken, New Jersey, on September 12, 1951, the son of Italian-American parents Mary (née Centrella) and Dominic "Monk" Pantoliano. He traces his ancestry to Avellino, Campania. His mother was a bookmaker and seamstress, while his father was a hearse driver and factory foreman. His family moved to Cliffside Park, New Jersey, where he attended Cliffside Park High School. He attended the HB Studio and studied extensively under actors Herbert Berghof and John Lehne.

== Career ==
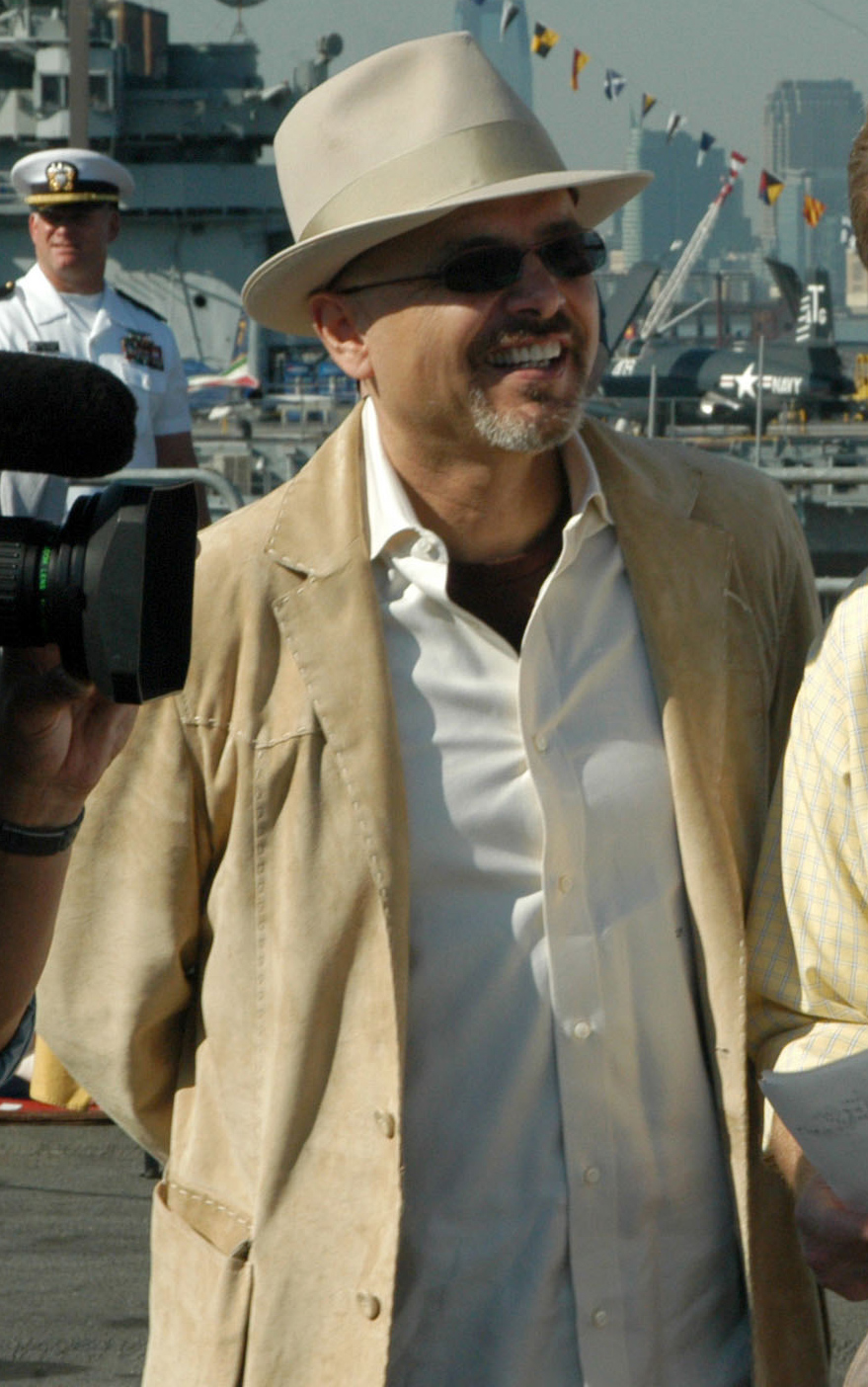
Pantoliano aboard USS John F. Kennedy during Fleet Week, 2005

Pantoliano first grew to fame as Guido the killer pimp in 1983's Risky Business. In 1985 he appeared as the villainous Francis Fratelli in teen classic The Goonies. He gained fame among a new generation as Cypher in the 1999 landmark sci-fi film The Matrix. He won a Primetime Emmy Award for Outstanding Supporting Actor in a Drama Series for the role of Ralph Cifaretto in HBO's The Sopranos.

Pantoliano is also known for his role as Eddie Moscone, the foul-mouthed, double-crossing bail bondsman, in the Robert De Niro comedy Midnight Run, as Captain Conrad Howard in Bad Boys, Bad Boys II, Bad Boys for Life and Bad Boys: Ride or Die, as double-crossed mafioso Caesar in Bound, as John "Teddy" Gammell in Memento, and as investigative journalist Ben Urich in Mark Steven Johnson's 2003 Daredevil adaptation. He played Deputy U.S. Marshal Cosmo Renfro in The Fugitive along with Tommy Lee Jones and reprised the role in the sequel U.S. Marshals.

In 2003 Pantoliano replaced Stanley Tucci in the Broadway play Frankie and Johnny in the Clair de Lune.

In 2012 Pantoliano starred as the eccentric pawn broker Oswald Oswald in the film adaptation of Wendy Mass's popular children's book Jeremy Fink and the Meaning of Life, written and directed by Tamar Halpern. In 2013, he was cast as Yogi Berra in the Broadway production of Bronx Bombers, but dropped out during rehearsals due to "creative differences." From 2015 to 2018 he played Michael Gorski in the Wachowskis' Netflix series Sense8.

In 2025, Pantoliano appeared in the episode "The Price" in the second season of The Last of Us playing Gail's moribund infected husband Eugene Lynden. Despite his limited appearance, his one-scene performance was met with high critical acclaim, earning him a nomination for the Emmy Award for Outstanding Guest Actor in a Drama Series.

== Personal life ==
Pantoliano was married to Morgan Kester from 1979 until they divorced in 1985. He married his second wife, former model Nancy Sheppard, in 1994; they have four children together, and reside in Wilton, Connecticut. He was introduced to Sheppard by actress Samantha Phillips.

During his tenure on The Sopranos, Pantoliano struggled to stay anonymous in his native New Jersey; when filming his scenes as Ralph, he prevented the public from recognizing him by wearing a wig based on the hairstyle of filmmaker Christopher Nolan, who had previously directed him in Memento. Pantoliano's use of a wig was later alluded to in the show, with a reveal that his character also wore a wig.

On October 9, 2007, Pantoliano announced on the National Alliance on Mental Illness blog that he had been suffering from clinical depression for the past decade, although he was formally diagnosed only recently. He also has dyslexia. He said his 2006 film Canvas helped him come to terms with his depression. Rather than hide his illness from the public, he chose to speak out about it to remove some of the stigma commonly associated with mental illness. He founded a nonprofit organization called No Kidding, Me Too! which aims to unite members of the entertainment industry in educating the public about mental illness. The title comes from the response he frequently heard after revealing how mental illness affected him and his family. He directed, wrote, and starred in the documentary No Kidding! Me 2!! (2009).

Pantoliano is the author of two memoirs: Who's Sorry Now: The True Story of a Stand-Up Guy and Asylum: Hollywood Tales From My Great Depression: Brain Dis-Ease, Recovery, and Being My Mother's Son. He revealed in the latter that he struggled with alcoholism, food addiction, sex addiction, and addictions to Vicodin and Percocet before being diagnosed with clinical depression.

On May 1, 2020, Pantoliano suffered a concussion and chest trauma when he was hit by a car while walking in his neighborhood.

== Filmography ==
=== Film ===
Year	Title	Role	Notes
1974	Road Movie	Mugger	Credited as Joseph Pantoliano
1974	For Pete's Sake	Undercover Cop	Uncredited
1980	The Idolmaker	Gino Pilato	
1982	Monsignor	Private Joe Musso	
1983	The Final Terror	Eggar Buelton	
1983	Risky Business	Guido	
1983	Eddie and the Cruisers	"Doc" Robbins	
1985	The Mean Season	Andy Porter	
1985	The Goonies	Francis Fratelli	
1986	Running Scared	"Snake"	
1987	Scenes from the Goldmine	Manny Ricci	
1987	La Bamba	Bob Keane	
1987	The Squeeze	Norman	
1987	Amazon Women on the Moon	Sy Swerdlow	Segment: "Hairlooming"
1987	Empire of the Sun	Frank Demarest	
1988	The In Crowd	Perry Parker	
1988	Midnight Run	Eddie Moscone	
1990	Ardouous Moon	Unknown	Short film
1990	Downtown	White	
1990	Blue Heat	Wayne Gross	
1990	Short Time	Scalese	
1990	Backstreet Dreams	Paul Antangeli	Uncredited
1991	Zandalee	Gerri	
1992	Used People	Frank	
1993	Three of Hearts	Mickey	
1993	The Fugitive	Deputy U.S. Marshal Cosmo Renfro	
1993	Calendar Girl	Harvey Darpinian	
1993	Me and the Kid	Roy	
1994	Robot in the Family	The Father	
1994	Teresa's Tattoo	Bruno	
1994	Baby's Day Out	Norbert "Norby" LeBlaw	
1995	Bad Boys	Captain Conrad Howard	
1995	Congo	Eddie Ventro	Uncredited
1995	The Last Word	Doc	
1995	Steal Big Steal Little	Eddie Agopian, Ruben's Lawyer	
1995	The Immortals	Pete Tunnell	
1996	The Flight of the Dove	Attorney Brezner	
1996	Bound	Caesar	
1997	Top of the World	Vince Castor	
1997	Aliens Attack	Captain Nevins	
1997	Tinseltown	Arnie	
1997	Natural Enemy	Stuart	Direct-to-video
1998	U.S. Marshals	Deputy U.S. Marshal Cosmo Renfro	
1998	Hoods	Charlie Flynn	
1998	Taxman	Al Benjamin	
1999	Forces of Nature	Cab Driver	Uncredited cameo
1999	The Matrix	Cypher / Mr. Reagan	
1999	Black and White	Bill King	
1999	The Life Before This	Jake MacLean	
1999	New Blood	Hellman	
2000	Ready to Rumble	Titus Sinclair	
2000	Memento	James Edward "Teddy" Gammell	
2000	A Better Way to Die	"Flash"	
2001	Cats & Dogs	Peek (voice)	
2002	A Call for Help	Charlie	
2002	The Adventures of Pluto Nash	Mogan	
2003	Daredevil	Ben Urich	
2003	Bad Boys II	Captain Conrad Howard	
2003	Silver Man	Norbert	
2004	Second Best	Elliot	
2004	Perfect Opposites	Louis Carbonelli	
2004	The Easter Egg Adventure	Terrible Timothy Takit (voice)	
2005	Racing Stripes	Goose (voice)	
2005	The Check Up	The Inspector	Short film
2005	The Amateurs	Some Idiot	
2006	Larry the Cable Guy: Health Inspector	Mayor Maurice T. Gunn	
2006	Wedding Daze	Smitty	
2006	Canvas	John Marino	
2006	Unknown	Bound Man / Brockman	
2007	Spring Break '83	Sergeant Coltrane	Unreleased
2009	The Job	Perriman	
2009	Deadly Impact	David Kaplow	
2009	Falling Up	George	
2010	The Legend of Secret Pass	Chucksta (voice)	
2010	Percy Jackson & the Olympians: The Lightning Thief	Gabe Ugliano	
2010	Cats & Dogs: The Revenge of Kitty Galore	Peek (voice)	
2010	New York Street Games	Himself	Documentary
2011	Loosies	Carl	
2011	Jeremy Fink and the Meaning of Life	Oswald Oswald III	
2014	The Identical	Avi Hirshberg	
2016	The Perfect Match	Marty	
2017	Just Getting Started	Joey	
2018	Happy Anniversary	Aldo	
2018	Feast of the Seven Fishes	Uncle Frankie	
2018	The Brawler	Al Braverman	
2019	From the Vine	Marco Gentile	
2020	Bad Boys for Life	Captain Conrad Howard	
2021	Hide and Seek	Collin Carmichael	
2024	Bad Boys: Ride or Die	Captain Conrad Howard	
2026	Violent Night 2 †	TBA	Post-production

=== Television ===
Year	Title	Role	Notes
1977	McNamara's Band	Frankie Milano	Television film
1978	Free Country	Louis Peschi	3 episodes
1979	From Here to Eternity	Private Angelo Maggio	3 episodes
1980	Alcatraz: The Whole Shocking Story	Ray Neal	Television film
1981	M*A*S*H	Corporal Gerald Mullen / Josh Levin	Episode: "Identity Crisis"
1981–1984	Hart to Hart	Frank Tisdale / Nate Volkman	2 episodes
1982	Chicago Story	Cooney	Episode: "Who Needs the Truth?"
1983	Hardcastle and McCormick	Teddy Hollins	Episode: "The Crystal Duck"
1984	Mister Roberts	Insignia	Television film
1984	Hill Street Blues	Sonny Orsini	2 episodes
1984	Trapper John, M.D.	Michael Merrow	Episode: "Where There's a Will"
1984	Simon & Simon	Carl	Episode: "Who Killed the Sixties?"
1985	Robert Kennedy & His Times	Roy Cohn	Episode #1.1
1986	Amazing Stories	Joe	Episode: "One for the Road"
1986	L.A. Law	Rob Cavanaugh	Episode: "Pilot"
1987	Destination America	Lieutenant Mike Amico	Television film
1987	Beverly Hills Buntz	Jimmy Montaigne	Episode: "Pilot"
1988	Rock 'n' Roll Mom	Ronnie	Television film
1989	Nightbreaker	Sergeant Jack Russell	Television film
1989	The Hitchhiker	Brother Charles	Episode: "Miracle of Alice Ames"
1989	Tales from the Crypt	Ulrich The Undying	Episode: "Dig That cat...He's real gone"
1990	El Diablo	Truman "Kid Durango" Feathers	Television film
1990–1991	The Fanelli Boys	Dominic Fanelli	19 episodes
1991	One Special Victory	Daniel	Television film
1992	Through the Eyes of a Killer	Jerry	Television film
1992	Highlander: The Series	Dr. Wilder	Episode: "Deadly Medicine"
1994	Dangerous Heart	Barclay	Television film
1994	Beethoven	Sparky (voice)	12 episodes
1995	The Marshal	Cameris	Episode: "Unprotected Witness"
1995	NYPD Blue	Vinnie Greco	3 episodes
1996	Ed McBain's 87th Precinct: Ice	Detective Meyer Meyer	Television film
1996	Life with Louie	Jojo Stomopolous (voice)	Episode: "Caddy on a Hot Tin Roof"
1996	Arliss	Vic Freed	Episode: "The Client's Best Interest"
1996–1997	EZ Streets	Jimmy Murtha	12 episodes
1998	Hercules	King Pan (voice)	Episode: "Hercules and the King for a Day"
1998	The Lionhearts	Director (voice)	5 episodes
1998–2000	Godzilla: The Series	Victor "Animal" Palotti (voice)	8 episodes
1999	Sugar Hill	Joe	Pilot
1999	The Outer Limits	Stan Harbinger	Episode: "Alien Radio"
1999	Olive, the Other Reindeer	Martini (voice)	Television special
2001	Roswell	Kal Langley	2 episodes
2001–2004	The Sopranos	Ralph Cifaretto	21 episodes
2002	The Nick Cannon Show	Himself	2 episodes
2003	Gary the Rat	Anthony "The Heel" Stilletto (voice)	Episode: "Sleeps with the Fishes"
2003–2004	The Handler	Joe Renato	16 episodes
2004	Dr. Vegas	Tommy Danko	7 episodes
2006	Deceit	Anthony	Television film
2006	Waterfront	Jimmy Centrella	Unreleased series
2006	The Simpsons	Dante (voice)	Episode: "The Mook, the Chef, the Wife and Her Homer"
2011	How to Make it in America	Felix DiFlorio	2 episodes
2014	More Time with Family	Stan Rizzo	Pilot
2015	Deadbeat	Famous Actor	Episode: "The Emancipation Apparition"
2015–2017	Sense8	Michael Gorski	Uncredited; 5 episodes
2017	SpongeBob SquarePants	Stickyfins Whiting (voice)	Episode: "The Getaway"
2018	Lake Placid: Legacy	Henderson	Television film
2020–2021	MacGyver	Eric Andrews	2 episodes
2020–2023	Tacoma FD	Eddie Penisi Sr.	4 episodes
2021	The Santa Stakeout	Francis Miller	Television film
2022	Chucky	Himself	Episode: "Death on Denial"
2023	The Patrick Star Show	Stickyfins Whiting (voice)	Episode: "Patrick's Prison Pals"
2024	Dexter: Original Sin	Mad-Dog	Episode: "Fender Bender"
2025	The Last of Us	Eugene Lynden	Episode: "The Price"
2025	Holiday Touchdown: A Bills Love Story	Uncle Tommy	Television Film
2026	Power Book III: Raising Kanan	Pino Barnardi	8 episodes
2026	Wonder Man	Himself	Miniseries; 2 episodes

=== Video games ===
Year	Title	Character	Notes
2001	Majestic	Tim Pritchard	Episode 4
2001	Grand Theft Auto III	Luigi Goterelli	
2013	Call of Duty: Black Ops II	Albert "Weasel" Arlington	Mob of the Dead expansion

== Awards and nominations ==
Year	Association	Category	Nominated work	Result
1997	Saturn Awards	Best Supporting Actor	Bound	Nominated
1997	Television Critics Association	Individual Achievement in Drama	EZ Streets	Nominated
1997	Viewers for Quality Television	Best Supporting Actor in a Quality Drama Series	EZ Streets	Nominated
2002	Screen Actors Guild Awards	Outstanding Performance by an Ensemble in a Drama Series	The Sopranos	Nominated
2003	Primetime Emmy Awards	Outstanding Supporting Actor in a Drama Series	The Sopranos	Won
2004	Screen Actors Guild Awards	Outstanding Performance by an Ensemble in a Drama Series	The Sopranos	Nominated
2025	Primetime Emmy Awards	Outstanding Guest Actor in a Drama Series	The Last of Us	Nominated

== Bibliography ==
- Who's Sorry Now: The True Story of a Stand-Up Guy, Joe Pantoliano, David Evanier, Dutton Books (2002), ISBN 978-0525946779
- Asylum, Joe Pantoliano, Hachette Books (2013), ISBN 978-1602861992
