= A Mango-Shaped Space =

2003 book by Wendy Mass

- 1st edition copy
- Author: Wendy Mass
- Cover artist: Alison Impey
- Language: English
- Genre: Realistic Fiction
- Publisher: Little, Brown Young Readers
- Publication date: April 16, 2003
- Publication place: United States
- Media type: Print (hardcover) & Paperback), audiobook
- Pages: 221 pp
- ISBN: 0-316-52388-7
- OCLC: 50803170
- LC Class: PZ7.M42355 Man 2003

A Mango-Shaped Space is a 2003 young adult novel by the American author Wendy Mass. A Mango-Shaped Space is Mass's fourth fiction novel. The book received the American Library Association Schneider Family Book Award in 2004. The novel has since been nominated for, and received, a number of other awards. The hand lettering on the cover is by Billy Kelly. The book is recommended for grades 5–8. A 7-hour long audiobook version, narrated by Danielle Ferland, has been produced.

The plot focuses on Mia Winchell, a thirteen-year-old girl living with synesthesia, a jumbling of the senses. Words and sounds appear to have color for Mia. The novel is about Mia's experiences as a synesthete and the problems she faces in school and with her friends. Ultimately, Mia's family and peers are able to empathize with her and help her move forward.

== Awards and achievements ==
- Nominated for a 2007 Audie Award (for the book version)
- Nominated for a 2008 Audie Award (for the audiobook version)
- Received the 2004 Schneider Family Book Award in the middle-grade category by the American Library Association
- Received the 2005 Great Lakes Great Book Award from the state of Michigan
- Named in the 2006 YA Top 40 by the Pennsylvania School Librarians Association
- VOYA Top Shelf selection 2003
- Autumn 2003 Children's BookSense 76 pick
- Listed as a 2014 & 2005 New York Public Library's Best Books for the Teen Age
- Bank Street Books top 35 children's books of the last 35 years

== Reception ==
Critical reception for the book has been mixed. A Mango-Shaped Space has received reviews from Kirkus Reviews, Booklist, School Library Journal, VOYA, The Washington Post, Kliatt, and Publishers Weekly.

Booklist praised that "the...narration lends immediacy and impact to Mia's color perceptions...a quietly unusual and promising offering". Publishers Weekly commented that the book has "well-defined characterizations, natural-sounding dialogue, and concrete imagery". The School Library Journal wrote "not all of the many characters are necessary to the story, and some of the plot elements go unresolved", and "Mia's parents are almost too perfect". Kirkus Reviews criticized that "the narrative...is rather overfull of details-a crazily built house, highly idiosyncratic family members, two boy interests, a beloved sick cat-which tend to compete for the reader's attention in much the same way as Mia's colors", and stated that this "flaw" is "not unusual with first novels". Kliatt criticized the plot, saying it isn't "half as interesting" as the "information on this rare condition". Kliatt also commented on Mia's "ups and downs", noting that they are "fairly ordinary". VOYA pointed out that this book is "probably not one that teens will pick up without coaxing".

The audiobook was criticized by School Library Journal, stating that "narrator Danielle Ferland moves from character to character effortlessly, but without much deviation in voice inflections for the secondary players". On the other hand, AudioFile praised the work, saying it "brings alive a unique young person and her rare gift".

A Mango-Shaped Space has been praised by several authors, including Paula Danziger, Karen Cushman, Meg Cabot, and Judy Blume.

== Publication details ==
- 2003, USA, Little, Brown, and Company (ISBN 978-0-316-52388-2), Pub date April 2003, hardback (first edition)
- 2005, USA, Little, Brown, and Company (ISBN 978-0-316-05825-4), Pub date October 2005, paperback
