= Aaron Dominguez =

American actor

Aaron Dominguez is an American actor. He is best known for his role as Oscar Torres in the Hulu comedy-drama series Only Murders in the Building.

== Early life ==
Dominguez was raised in Miami, Florida. He developed an interest in acting at a young age, influenced by a family background in the performing arts.

== Career ==
Dominguez began his acting career with roles in independent films and television before gaining wider recognition with his breakout role in Only Murders in the Building.

He was cast in the Hulu series in 2020, appearing alongside Steve Martin, Martin Short, and Selena Gomez.

He has been featured in interviews and profiles discussing his work and career in publications such as Women's Wear Daily, Collider, Decider, and Backstage.

In 2024, Dominguez signed with Anonymous Content for management.

His film credits include Shaft, The Inspection, Sitting in Bars with Cake, Witchboard, Ugly Cry, and Hive.

== Filmography ==
=== Film ===
Year	Title	Role	Notes
2026	Hive	Marco	
2026	Ugly Cry	—	
2024	Witchboard	Christian	
2024	Breathe	Javier Roberto	Independent film
2023	Sitting in Bars with Cake	Dave	
2022	The Inspection	Castro	
2020	Words on Bathroom Walls	Todd	
2019	Shaft	Staff Sergeant Eddie Dominguez	

=== Television ===
Year	Title	Role	Notes
2021	Only Murders in the Building	Oscar Torres	Main role
2021	Two Sides: Unfaithful	Emmanuel	12 episodes
2023	Gossip Girl	Phillip Price	1 episode
2025	Pulse	Rodrigo	1 episode
2019	SEAL Team	David Yoder	1 episode
2019	Should I Do It?	Brent Porter	2 episodes
