= Jeremy Fink and the Meaning of Life =

Children's novel and film adaptation

- The cover of the first edition
- Author: Wendy Mass
- Language: English
- Genre: Children's novel
- Publisher: Little, Brown and Company
- Publication date: November 2006
- Publication place: United States
- Media type: Print (hardcover and paperback)
- Pages: 289 pp
- ISBN: 978-0-316-05829-2
- Dewey Decimal: [Fic] 22
- LC Class: PZ7.M42355 Jer 2006

Jeremy Fink and the Meaning of Life is a 2006 children's novel by Wendy Mass. The story follows twelve-year-old Jeremy Fink and his neighbor Lizzy Muldoun as they attempt to retrieve four keys that unlock a wooden box delivered one month before Jeremy's 13th birthday. The novel contains information that provides a connection to Every Soul a Star, a children's novel also by Wendy Mass.

An independent film adaptation of the novel, starring Maxwell Beer as Jeremy Fink and Ryan Simpkins as Lizzy Muldoun, was released in 2012. Writer/director Tamar Halpern adapted the book and directed along with Jamar Crawford.

== Plot summary ==
One month before his thirteenth birthday, Jeremy Fink and his best friend Lizzy Muldoun were out in his New York City apartment when the mailman delivers a package addressed to Jeremy's mom. Lizzy convinces him to open the package. Inside the package, they discover a wooden box with four keyholes and the words, "THE MEANING OF LIFE: FOR JEREMY FINK TO OPEN ON HIS 13TH BIRTHDAY." Jeremy immediately recognizes the box as the work of his father, who died five years earlier in a car crash. An accompanying note explains that the friend taking care of the box lost all of the keys. Determined to open the box, Jeremy and Lizzy contact a locksmith who explains that he is unable to pick the locks or break the box open without destroying the box and possibly its contents. The two friends set a goal to find the keys by the end of the summer so Jeremy can still open the box on his thirteenth birthday.

Lizzy's impulsiveness gets the duo into trouble for destroying property and they must spend the summer performing community service. Jeremy and Lizzy are assigned to work for Mr. Oswald, an antique dealer preparing to retire to Florida, who sends them to deliver some special antiques. Once the first house is reached, the children realize they are returning items to the original owners, people who pawned these items when only teenagers. Each item is being returned with the original letter stating why the owner chose to pawn the items.

The people Jeremy meets help him learn important lessons about life by sharing their views. While doing community service they must find all of the keys they can, continuously worrying about the performance they must do at a fair due to losing a bet to Jeremy's grandmother.

It is only in the end that Jeremy truly understands the meaning of life when he opens the box.

== Reception ==
Publishers Weekly described Jeremy Fink and the Meaning of Life as a "meaningful novel" not to be missed, saying that much of "the novel's charm derives from Jeremy and Lizzy's unique friendship". BookPage described it as "a moving, hilarious and altogether engaging tale of self-discovery".

== Film adaptation ==
Fink Films, in association with Kidzhouse Entertainment, released a film adaptation in 2011. Tamar Halpern wrote and directed the screenplay, and the film starred Mira Sorvino, Joe Pantoliano, Maxwell Beer and Ryan Simpkins as the eponymous Jeremy Fink and his best friend, Lizzy Muldoun. The film won Best Family Film at the Garden State Film Festival 2012.
