= The Candymakers =

2010 young adult novel by Wendy Mass

- First edition cover
- Author: Wendy Mass
- Cover artist: Alison Impey
- Language: English
- Series: The Candymakers
- Publisher: Little, Brown, and Company
- Publication date: October 5, 2010
- Pages: 464
- ISBN: 978-0-316-00258-5
- Followed by: The Candymakers and the Great Chocolate Chase

The Candymakers is a 2010 novel by Wendy Mass. It is the first novel in The Candymakers series and received positive reception upon release.

== Synopsis ==
A mysterious candy factory hosts a contest between children to determine who can invent the best new candy. Among the contestants are a professional spy and the son of the factory's owners. As the book progresses, the events are retold through the eyes of four of the contestants, with each retelling revealing new perspectives and information.

== Publishing history ==
The Candymakers was published in the United States on October 5, 2010, by Little, Brown and Company. An audiobook version was recorded by Mark Turetsky.

The book was followed by a sequel, The Candymakers and the Great Chocolate Chase, in 2016. A graphic novel prequel illustrated by Keiko Nishijima, Life is Sweet, was released in 2026.

== Reception ==
The novel received positive reviews upon release. Kirkus Reviews published a positive review, describing the novel as a "half-mystery, half-jigsaw-puzzle" and comparing it to The Westing Game and When You Reach Me, while Booklist praised the book's diverse perspectives. The Horn Book Magazine complimented the depth given to each character and described the book's overall message as being about "not leaping to conclusions." The Bulletin of the Center for Children's Books was also positive, drawing attention to the "magic and whimsy" of the story's setting.
