= Bunny Michael =

American rapper

- Born: Melisa Rincón; 1981 or 1982 (age 43–44)
- Origin: Dallas, Texas, U.S.
- Genres: Rap
- Occupations: Visual artist, musician, rapper

Melisa Rincón (born 1982 or 1983) known professionally as Bunny Michael, is an American interdisciplinary visual artist, musician, and rapper.

== Early life and education ==
Bunny Michael was raised in Dallas, Texas. They are the middle of three children born to a second-generation Mexican American father and a Samoan mother. They were raised in an affluent suburb. Michael attended Booker T. Washington High School for the Performing and Visual Arts. They realized they were queer at the age of fifteen and stated that coming out to their family was a difficult process. Michael briefly moved in with their first girlfriend's family. They have since reconciled with their family. Michael graduated from Marymount Manhattan College.

== Career ==
Michael is a visual artist, musician, and rapper whose work often examines the relationship between the masculine and feminine, the body and the soul, and the self and higher self. After graduating from college, they shared their music through Myspace. Michael was the vocalist performing by the name Bunny Rabbit with producer Black Cracker. It is described by HuffPost as an "eponymous experimental rap collaboration." Bunny Rabbit toured with CocoRosie and gained praise from New Yorker critic Sasha Frere-Jones who stated in 2007, "I am fond of the deeply odd, occasionally obscene art rap of Bunny Rabbit."

Michael garnered a large fan base through Myspace which allowed them to book their own U.S. tour.

Michael was working as a waiter in 2017. In 2018, Michael went on tour in Europe with Fever Ray.

They are known for their "Me and My Higher Self" memes on Instagram which started when Michael was undergoing a major spiritual transformation of their own. This project is aimed at increasing self-love, and much like Michael's music and visual art, also explores the multiplicities within the self. Remezcla reports that Michael is a "queer multimedia artist...[who] utilizes music, art videos, and memes as their mediums to explore themes of self love and acceptance, spirituality, and sexuality in a time when our 'deepest truths are being revealed'."

Michael is the host of “Broadly Hotline,” a web series on Broadly. Michael is currently working on starting a podcast centered around self-care, personal growth, and other millennial-related topics. Michael appeared in two seasons of the HBO series High Maintenance.

In 2026, Michael played Tricia in the film By the Roots.

== Influences ==
Two years into their music career, Michael was influenced by the book A New Earth. They are a student of A Course in Miracles.

== Personal life ==
Michael moved to New York City one week before the September 11 attacks in 2001. Michael is non-binary and now lives in The Hudson Valley with spouse, Khara Gilvey and a cat named Pepper.

== See also ==
- LGBT culture in Dallas–Fort Worth
- LGBT culture in New York City
