= The Year Between =

2022 film by Alex Heller

- Theatrical release poster
- Directed by: Alex Heller
- Written by: Alex Heller
- Produced by: Caterin Camargo-Alvarez; Rachel Gould; Alex Heller; Sonya Lunsford; Eugene Sun Park; Amanda Phillips
- Starring: Alex Heller; J. Smith-Cameron; Steve Buscemi; Wyatt Oleff; Emily Robinson; Kyanna Simone; Rajeev Jacob
- Cinematography: Jason Chiu
- Edited by: Harrison Atkins
- Music by: Kotomi (Lauren Culjak)
- Production companies: Full Spectrum Features NFP; Level Forward
- Distributed by: Gravitas Ventures
- Release dates: June 12, 2022 (Tribeca); March 3, 2023 (limited)
- Running time: 94 minutes
- Country: United States
- Language: English

The Year Between is a 2022 American independent dramedy film, written and directed by Alex Heller in her feature directorial debut, who also stars alongside J. Smith-Cameron, Steve Buscemi, Wyatt Oleff, Emily Robinson, Kyanna Simone, and Rajeev Jacob. The film follows Clemence (Heller), a maladjusted collegiate dropout with bipolar disorder, who returns home to her reticent family and attempts to juggle her fractured relationships along with the everyday pressures of "adulting".

The Year Between premiered at the Tribeca Festival on June 12, 2022, where it was nominated for the Best U.S. Narrative Feature. After a minor festival tour, the film was subsequently released in the United States and Canada in limited theaters on March 3, 2023, to positive reviews, while simultaneously made available for streaming on Peacock and Hoopla.

== Plot ==
In her sophomore year at college, Clemence Miller (Heller) has alienated everyone with her erratic behavior. After incurring a manic bout of bullying, her miserable roommate, Eliza (Blim), notifies the administration and her craft store proprietress mother, Sherri (Smith-Cameron), of Clemence's disparaging attitude and mood swings. This prompts Sherri to wrangle her daughter into quitting school and compel her to begrudgingly return home, whereupon she discovers her old bedroom has been converted into a home office. Instead, she'll be "banished" to the furnished basement.

Upon visiting a psychiatrist (Buck), Clemence is diagnosed with bipolar disorder and is prescribed a regimen of medication beginning with lithium to balance her oscillating mania and depression episodes, which will require experimental adjustments. Initially, she is defiant and reluctant; however, an exasperated Sherri encourages her.

Meanwhile, she receives a tepid welcome from the rest of the family. Her father, local schoolteacher Don (Buscemi), attempts to be relentlessly positive, while her younger siblings are far less enthused. Her sister, Carlin (Robinson), fears Clemence's attributes will be imparted unto her, and thus strives to achieve high ACT scores to prevent this. Her brother, Neil (Oleff), is trepidatious about being absorbed into Clemence's unstable orbit, and retains an ambivalent attitude when in her presence.

Undeterred, Clemence begins attending sessions with a psychologist (Odom) and lands a job part-time at a thrift store. She forges a strained connection with co-worker Beth (Simone), and manages to stay sober from alcohol and illicit drugs. However, upon reconnecting with erstwhile partying pal, Ashik (Jacob), Clemence begins to jeopardize her progress and runs the risk of losing what little support she has left.

== Cast ==
- Alex Heller as Clemence Miller
- J. Smith-Cameron as Sherri Miller
- Steve Buscemi as Don Miller
- Wyatt Oleff as Neil Miller
- Emily Robinson as Carlin Miller
- Kyanna Simone as Beth
- Rajeev Jacob as Ashik
- Waltrudis Buck as Dr. Lismoen
- Jon Hudson Odom as Dr. Madzen
- Taylor Marie Blim as Eliza
- Anne Hollister as Ginger
- David Brown as Mikael

== Release ==
The Year Between had its world premiere at the Tribeca Festival on June 12, 2022. Heller's film was amongst those nominated for Best U.S. Narrative Feature at that year's event, although it ultimately lost out to Good Girl Jane.

The film then screened at the Nashville Film Festival on October 1, 2022. At that event, Heller was awarded the Grand Jury Prize for Best New Directors Feature, marking her first win for this film.

On October 16, 2022, the film was screened at the Chicago International Film Festival. Alongside Glass Onion: A Knives Out Mystery in a tie, the two films were the recipients of the Audience Choice Award for Best Feature, presented by Xfinity.

On March 3, 2023, Gravitas Ventures distributed the film in the United States and Canada in select theaters. It was simultaneously made available through VOD, on the streaming platforms Peacock and Hoopla.

The film was also screened at the Cleveland International Film Festival on March 23, 2023, where it was nominated for the American Independents Competition. Heller was also a nominee for the Reel Women Direct Award for Excellence in Directing by a Woman. However, the latter award went to Christine Yoo for 26.2 to Life, while the former was won by Playing Through from Balbinka Korzeniowska.

== Critical response ==
On the review aggregator website Rotten Tomatoes, 80% of 15 critics' reviews are positive, with an average rating of 6.9/10. Metacritic, which uses a weighted average, assigned the film a score of 61 out of 100, based on four critics, indicating "generally favorable" reviews.

Mike McGranaghan of The Aisle Seat wrote, "A personal pet peeve is movies that use mental illness as a “quirky” personality trait for their central characters....The Year Between deftly avoids all that. This is one of the most authentic depictions of bipolar disorder I've seen." Dennis Harvey from Variety is equally effusive, praising Heller for maintaining a tonal balance of the subject matter: "The result is a useful mix of the pseudo-random and finely honed that refuses to hand-wring over Clem’s travails, yet simultaneously makes an upbeat case for her emerging from them intact — even if she’ll never exactly be Miss Congeniality." He also lauds the performances from the cast, and stated, "[The characters are] all amusing, yet free of caricature, and the prickly dynamics between them feel tart without being cynical."

Nick Allen, a critic at RogerEbert.com, wrote in his 3½/4-star review, that "Alex Heller pulls off a dazzling tonal high-wire act for her directorial debut"; compliments the film's dialogue as "naturally, wildly funny, without sugarcoating the issues it embraces"; and concludes, "…that a daring dramedy like this can be made, and tactfully.…It's proof of a major talent." Steven Warner of In Review Online praised Buscemi and Smith-Cameron, both of whom he stated "have arguably never delivered a bad performance in their entire careers".

Rendy Jones of Rendy Reviews had a mixed reception to the film, rating it 2½/5 stars. Jones applauded Heller's "deadpan charisma"; alluded to her having "chemistry with her co-stars", especially for her acting debut; and particularly complimenting the acting ensemble of Smith-Cameron, Buscemi, Robinson, and Oleff (who portray her mom, dad, sister, and brother, respectively). On the flipside, Jones had a bad reaction to the "deplorably crass main character" and took umbrage with the screenplay, evoking unfavorable comparisons to Lady Bird (2017). He felt it was "too formulaic…reminiscent of Judd Apatow's slacker comedies". In a more scathingly negative review, Carla Hay of Culture Mix lambasts the character of Clemence, calling her an "emotional terrorist", and summarizing, "The misguided comedy/drama “The Year Between” is an irritating slog that offensively uses bipolar disorder as an excuse for the central character to be cruel and toxic to everyone around her."

== Accolades ==
| Year | Award | Category | Nominee(s) | Result | Ref. |
|---|---|---|---|---|---|
| 2022 | Tribeca Festival | Founders Award — Best U.S. Narrative Feature | Alex Heller | Nominated | |
| 2022 | Nashville Film Festival | Grand Jury Prize — Best New Directors Feature | Alex Heller | Won | |
| 2022 | Chicago International Film Festival | Audience Choice Award — Best Feature (TIE) (with Glass Onion: A Knives Out Mystery) | Alex Heller | Won | |
| 2023 | Cleveland International Film Festival | Reel Women Direct Award | Alex Heller | Nominated | |
| 2023 | Cleveland International Film Festival | American Independents Competition | Alex Heller | Nominated | |
