= Ugly Cry (film) =

2026 American horror film

- Film poster
- Directed by: Emily Robinson
- Written by: Emily Robinson
- Produced by: Emily Robinson; Sophia Sabella; Pablo Feldman; Jolene Mendes; Rhianon Jones; Tristan Scott-Behrends
- Starring: Emily Robinson; Ryan Simpkins; Aaron Dominguez; Robin Tunney
- Cinematography: Brody S. Anderson
- Edited by: Patrick Lawrence
- Music by: Sóley Stefánsdóttir
- Production companies: More Avenue; Neon Heart Productions
- Distributed by: Obscured Releasing
- Release date: March 12, 2026 (SXSW)
- Running time: 94 minutes
- Country: United States
- Language: English

Ugly Cry is a 2026 American horror film written and directed by Emily Robinson, in her directorial debut. It stars Robinson, Ryan Simpkins, Aaron Dominguez, and Robin Tunney.

It had its world premiere at the 2026 South by Southwest Film & TV Festival on March 12, 2026.

== Premise ==
An actor's "ugly cry" costs them their dream role, leading them down a dark path towards perfection.

== Cast ==
- Emily Robinson
- Ryan Simpkins
- Aaron Dominguez
- Robin Tunney
- Andrew Leeds
- Heather Morris
- Chalia La Tour
- Ray Abruzzo
- Sophie von Haselberg
- Josh Ruben
- Melinda McGraw

== Production ==
In June 2025, it was announced Emily Robinson, Ryan Simpkins, Aaron Dominguez, Robin Tunney, Andrew Leeds, Heather Morris, Chalia La Tour, Ray Abruzzo, Sophie von Haselberg, Josh Ruben and Melinda McGraw had joined the cast of the film, with Robinson directing from a screenplay she wrote. Principal photography concluded in Los Angeles.

== Release ==
It had its world premiere at the 2026 South by Southwest Film & TV Festival on March 12, 2026. In July 2026, Obscured Releasing acquired distribution rights to the film.
