= Edge of Everything =

- Directed by: Pablo Feldman; Sophia Sabella
- Written by: Pablo Feldman; Sophia Sabella
- Starring: Sierra McCormick; Jason Butler Harner; Ryan Simpkins
- Release date: June 2023 (Munich)
- Running time: 81 minutes
- Country: United States
- Language: English

Edge of Everything is a 2023 American drama film written and directed by Pablo Feldman and Sophia Sabella and starring Sierra McCormick, Jason Butler Harner and Ryan Simpkins.

The film was shot in Mill Valley, California and various other locations around Marin County, and was partly inspired by Feldman and Sabella's experience of growing up in Marin.

== Cast ==
- Sierra McCormick as Abby
- Jason Butler Harner as David
- Ryan Simpkins as Caroline

== Release ==
The film premiered at Filmfest München in June 2023.

== Reception ==
The film has a 71% rating on Rotten Tomatoes based on 7 reviews.

Bradley Gibson of Film Threat scored the film a 7 out of 10.

Betsy Pickle of the Alliance of Women Film Journalists gave the film a positive review and wrote that it “crafts an effective nightmare with a familiar coming-of-age formula, a raw depiction of teen peer pressure and an alarming reflection of a licentious youth culture that can’t seem to shake toxic masculinity no matter how ‘woke’ it appears.”
