= Every Soul a Star =

2008 novel by Wendy Mass

- Cover art
- Author: Wendy Mass
- Language: English
- Subject: solar eclipses, friendship
- Genre: Realistic Fiction
- Publisher: Little, Brown and Co.
- Publication date: 2008
- Pages: 336
- ISBN: 0316002569
- Dewey Decimal: j813

Every Soul a Star is a 2008 novel for children and young adults by Wendy Mass. Taking turns in first person from each of the main character's' point of view, it follows the stories of Jack, a confidence-lacking 14-year-old who is slightly overweight, Ally, a nearly 13-year-old homeschooled girl who wants to be an astronomer, and Bree, a 13-year-old whose life goal is to be on the cover of Seventeen before she is seventeen. They all meet and see a solar eclipse together while learning about what is truly important in life and becoming better people.

== Plot ==
Ally lives at a campsite called The Moon Shadow where she is homeschooled by her parents along with her 10-year-old brother Kenny. They don't have phone reception and have barely seen any TV. Ally's dream is to discover a comet—or, barring that, an asteroid. She then discovers that her family is moving to Chicago and she will be put in public school.

Meanwhile, Bree is in the "A-Clique" in her school and is proud of it. Everyone calls her beautiful and she makes sure she stays that way. She wants to become a Prom Queen in high school and eventually be on the cover of Seventeen magazine before she's seventeen. Her "nerdy" family, however, has other plans. She, her parents, and her 11-year-old sister, Melanie, are going to move to The Moon Shadow to take the place of Ally and her family as the caretakers of the campsite. Bree is appalled at the thought of moving and doesn't want to be homeschooled in the middle of nowhere, with no boys, no friends and, most of all, no television.

Narrator 13-year-old Jack only finds comfort in reading and drawing in his tree house. His mom has been married four times. Jack longs for his father, who left his family before Jack was born. He has no friends; he is shy and overweight and often teased. One of his other escapes is lucid dreaming, taught to him by his third stepfather, which allows him to "fly" in his dreams. After failing science class, he is faced with the choice of either attending summer school or going to The Moon Shadow as a part of a group tour to watch an eclipse with his teacher, Mr. Silver. He chooses to go to The Moon Shadow and meets several people during the two-week trip.

Eventually, all three children meet each other at The Moon Shadow and form an unlikely friendship. Bree and Ally plot to convince their parents to change their minds about the move, but they fail in their attempt. Jack is smitten with Ally, even though they may not see each other again (but there is a good chance they will) and Bree is able to walk the labyrinth at the campsite, which she has been avoiding since she arrived. The group witnesses the eclipse, which amazes all of them and helps them to accept their circumstances. Bree's family invites Ally's family to visit for their annual "Star Party" each summer, while Bree personally teaches Ally the "ways of the world". At the end, Ally notices Jack's stuffed bunny. He hesitates at first, then explains that it is the only connection he has to his father, showing that he has grown in confidence while at The Moon Shadow. Friendship, change, and acceptance are shown strongly in this novel.

== Awards ==
The novel won the 2012 Middle School/Junior High California Young Reader Medal and the Homeschool Book Award. The novel has also been nominated for:

- Rebecca Caudill Young Readers' Book Award, Illinois, 2012
- South Carolina Children's Book Award, 2011
- Oklahoma Sequoyah Book Award, 2010–2011
- Iowa Children's Choice Award, 2010–2011
- Maud Hart Lovelace Award, Minnesota, 2010–2011
- Black-Eyed Susan Book Award, Maryland, 2011
- Colorado Blue Spruce Young Adult Book Award, 2011
- William Allen White Award Children's Book Award, Kansas, 2011
- Kentucky Bluegrass Award, 2010
- New Hampshire Great Stone Face Book Award 2009–10
- Chosen as a CCBC (Cooperative Children's Book Center) Choice Selection
