= Wendy Mass =

American novelist

- Born: April 22, 1967 (age 59); Livingston, New Jersey, U.S.
- Education: Tufts University
- Occupation: Novelist
- Writing career
- Language: English, Spanish
- Genres: Children's literature, Young adult fiction
- Notable works: 11 Birthdays; A Mango-Shaped Space; Every Soul a Star; Jeremy Fink and the Meaning of Life
- Notable awards: Schneider Family Book Award (2004) A Mango-Shaped Space
- Website: wendymass.com

Wendy Mass (born April 22, 1967) is an American author of young adult novels and children's books.

Her 2003 novel, A Mango-Shaped Space won the American Library Association (ALA) Schneider Family Book Award for Middle School in 2004. Her other notable works include: 11 Birthdays, A Mango-Shaped Space and Every Soul a Star.

Mass's novel Jeremy Fink and the Meaning of Life was adapted into a feature film in 2011.

== Early life ==
Born in Livingston, New Jersey, Mass's favorite subjects in school were reading and science. Wendy worked at town libraries and bookstores. As a child she would compete with friends to see who could read the most books; this helped develop her writing skills. Her first career vision was to be an astronaut. Mass's first story, co-written by her two siblings, starred a cat that somehow turned into a goat and destroyed her neighborhood.

In high school, Mass worked at a local bookstore and continued to hone her writing skills. She took writing classes and decided on writing for her career.

== Education ==
As an English major at Tufts University, Mass continued to develop her writing skills. Mass mainly wrote short stories throughout college, and after graduation she moved to Los Angeles, where she tried her hand at a multitude of writing businesses, including assisting a literary agent, and at a television casting company, editor of a magazine, and a script reader for a film producer. Mass realized she wanted to inspire pre-teens, teens, and adults by writing books for children, teens, and adults. She moved back to her New Jersey hometown and while writing, worked as a book editor, operating out of New York City and Connecticut. She has a master's degree in creative writing from California State University, Long Beach and a Doctor of Letters degree from Drew University.

== Honors and awards ==
Mass has published 31 novels for children and teens. She won the American Library Association (ALA) Schneider Family Book Award for her children's book A Mango-Shaped Space in 2004. In 2011, she won the Black Eyed Susan Award from The Maryland Association of School Librarians for 11 Birthdays. She won the American Library Association Award (best books for the teenage selection), New York Public, and New York Public Library Best Books for the teenage designation, Great Lakes Book Award and Michigan State award, and has since won 11 state book awards.

== Personal life ==
Mass currently resides in New Jersey with her family.

== Works ==
=== Non-fiction ===
- Stonehenge (1998)
- Teen Drug Abuse (1997)
- Women's Rights (1998)
- Readings on Night (2000)
- Great Authors of Children's Literature (2001)
- Discovering Mythology - Gods and Goddesses (2002)
- Ray Bradbury: Master of Science Fiction and Fantasy (2004)
- John Cabot: Early Explorer (2004)
- Celebrate Halloween (2009)

=== Fiction ===
- Getting a Clue (1996)
- The Bad Hair Day (1996 children's picture book)
- Noah and the Ark (1997)
- A Mango-Shaped Space (2003)
- Rapunzel: The One with All the Hair (2006)
- Sleeping Beauty: The One Who Took The Really Long Nap (2006)
- Jeremy Fink and the Meaning of Life (2006)
- Leap Day (2006)
- Heaven Looks A Lot Like The Mall (2007)
- Every Soul a Star (2008)
- 11 Birthdays (2009)
- Finally (2010)
- The Candymakers (2010)
- 13 Gifts (2011)
- Beauty and the Beast: The Only One Who Didn't Run Away (2012)
- Pi in The Sky (2013)
- The Last Present (2013)
- Space Taxi: Archie Takes Flight (2014)
- Space Taxi: Water Planet Rescue (2014)
- Graceful (2015)
- Space Taxi: Archie's Alien Disguise (2015)
- Space Taxi: The Galactic B.U.R.P. (2015)
- The Candymakers and the Great Chocolate Chase (2016)
- Voyagers: The Seventh Element (2016)
- Space Taxi: B.U.R.P. Strikes Back (2017)
- Space Taxi: Aliens on Earth (2017)
- Time Jumpers: Stealing the Sword (2019)
- Time Jumpers: Escape from Egypt (2019)
- Robin Hood: The One Who Looked Good in Green (2018)
- Bob (2018)
- Time Jumpers: Fast-Forward to the Future (2019)
- Time Jumpers: Dodging Dinosaurs (2019)
- Lo and Behold (2023)
- The Lost Library (2023)
- Green Jolene: Green Jolene and the Neighborhood Swap (2025)

=== TV scripts ===
- Mr. Monk Goes to the Theater (2003) (with Stu Levine and Tom Scharpling)
