= List of television shows set in New York City =

This page provides a partial list of television shows set in New York City.

== Shows set primarily in the five boroughs ==
=== 1940s–1960s ===
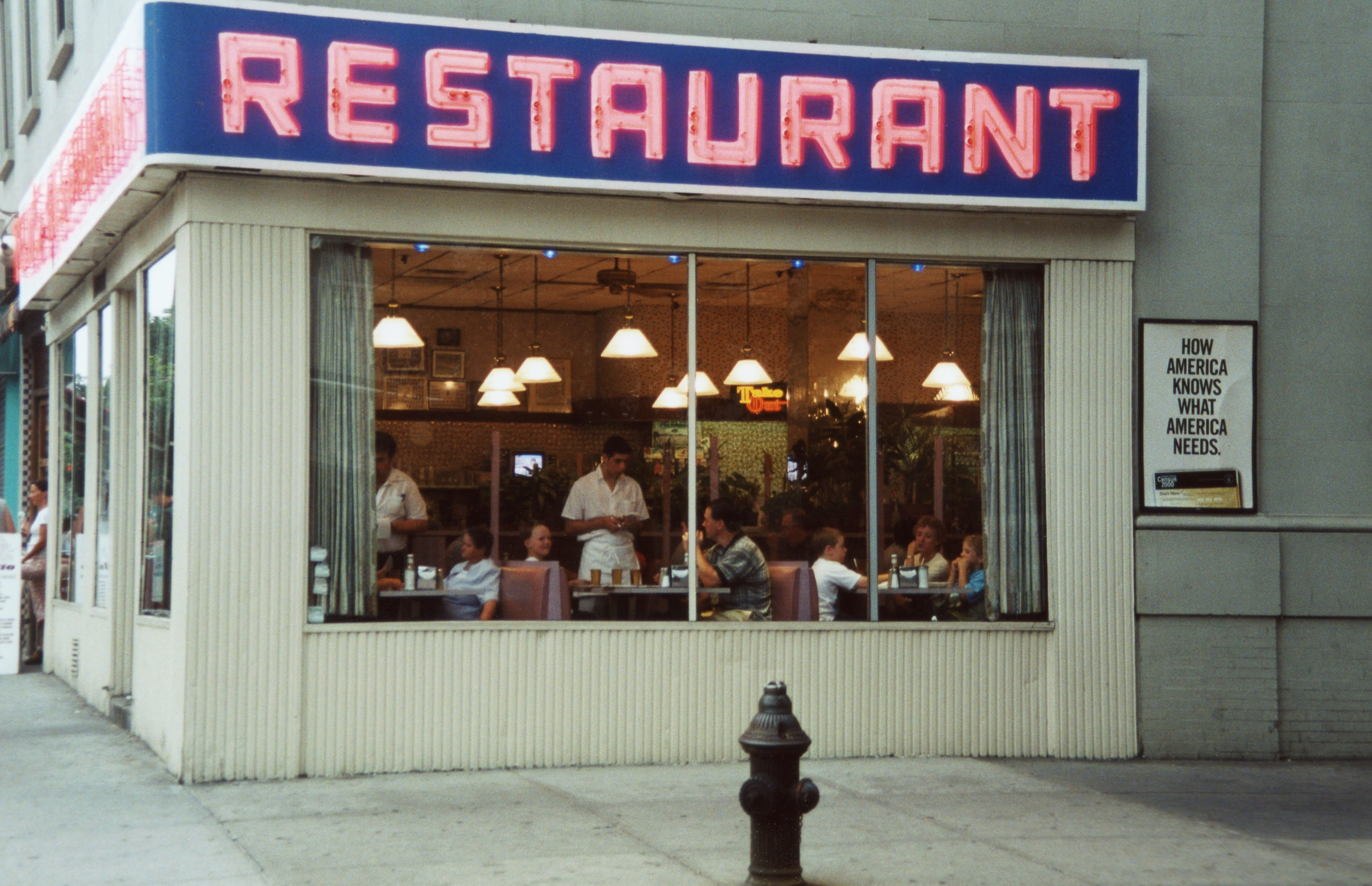
Tom's Restaurant, at West 112th Street and Broadway, was used as the establishing shot for "Monk's Cafe" on Seinfeld, a program that satirized life on the Upper West Side of Manhattan.

Title	Start	End	Comment
Mary Kay and Johnny	1947	1950	
The Goldbergs	1949	1956	The Bronx, moved to fictional Haverville, New York in final season.
I Love Lucy	1951	1957	Upper East Side, moved to Connecticut in final season.
My Little Margie	1952	1957	Upper Fifth Avenue
Meet Millie	1952	1956	Jackson Heights, Queens
Today	1952	present	Rockefeller Center
Make Room for Daddy	1953	1954	
Willy	1954	1955	Early episodes set in fictional Renfrew, New Hampshire
The Honeymooners	1955	1956	Bensonhurst, Brooklyn
It's Always Jan	1955	1956	Manhattan
Hey, Jeannie!	1956	1957	Brooklyn
The Thin Man	1957	1959	
The Jeannie Carson Show	1958		
Love That Jill	1958		Manhattan
Man with a Camera	1958	1960	
Naked City	1958	1963	
Johnny Staccato	1959	1960	
My Sister Eileen	1960	1961	
The Investigators	1961	1961	Manhattan
Top Cat	1961	1962	
Car 54, Where are You?	1961	1963	
The Joey Bishop Show	1961	1965	
The Dick Van Dyke Show	1961	1966	Workplace scenes in Manhattan; (see below)
Dr. Kildare	1961	1966	
The Patty Duke Show	1963	1966	Brooklyn Heights
Bewitched	1964	1972	Workplace scenes in Manhattan; (see below)
That Girl	1966	1971	Some episodes/scenes also set in Brewster in Putnam County
Family Affair	1966	1971	
Sesame Street	1969	present	

=== 1970s ===
Title	Start	End	Comment
The Trouble with Tracy	1970	1971	Taped in Toronto, Ontario, Canada
The Odd Couple	1970	1975	Park Avenue, Manhattan
McCloud	1970	1977	
All in the Family	1971	1979	Astoria, Queens
The Electric Company	1971	1977	
Dick Clark's New Year's Rockin' Eve	1972	present	Times Square, Manhattan
The Super	1972		
Bridget Loves Bernie	1972	1973	
Madigan	1972	1973	
Kojak	1973	1978	
Needles and Pins	1973		Garment District (Manhattan)
Rhoda	1974	1978	
Baretta	1975	1978	
Barney Miller	1975	1982	Greenwich Village (Manhattan)
Ellery Queen	1975	1976	
The Jeffersons	1975	1985	Upper East Side
Ryan's Hope	1975	1989	Upper East Side
Welcome Back, Kotter	1975	1979	Brooklyn
Saturday Night Live	1975	present	
Busting Loose	1977		
Fish	1977	1978	
Diff'rent Strokes	1978	1986	
Taxi	1978	1983	Manhattan
The Ted Knight Show	1978	1978	Manhattan
Archie Bunker's Place	1979	1983	Astoria, Queens
Eischied	1979	1980	
Flatbush	1979		Flatbush (Brooklyn)

=== 1980s ===
Title	Start	End	Comment
Bosom Buddies	1980	1982	
Checking In	1981		Manhattan
Gimme a Break!	1981	1987	final season only, all prior seasons set in fictional Glenlawn, California
Love, Sidney	1981	1983	
Cagney & Lacey	1982	1988	
Fame	1982	1987	
Live with Kelly and Ryan	1983	present	
The Cosby Show	1984	1992	Brooklyn Heights, Brooklyn
Double Trouble	1984	1985	second season only; first season set in Des Moines, Iowa
Kate and Allie	1984	1989	Greenwich Village
Night Court	1984	1992	Manhattan
The Equalizer	1985	1989	
Foley Square	1985	1986	Manhattan (Foley Square and Upper West Side)
The Real Ghostbusters (Animated)	1986	1991	New York City
The Bronx Zoo	1987	1988	the Bronx
Beauty and the Beast	1987	1990	
Teenage Mutant Ninja Turtles	1987	1996	
Dear John	1988	1992	Rego Park, Queens

=== 1990s ===
Title	Start	End	Comment
Working Girl	1990		
Seinfeld	1989	1998	Upper West Side, Manhattan
Law & Order	1990	present	
Dream On	1990	1996	Manhattan
Brooklyn Bridge	1991	1993	Bensonhurst, Brooklyn
Herman's Head	1991	1994	
Ghostwriter	1992	1995	Fort Greene, Brooklyn
Love & War	1992	1995	
Mad About You	1992	1999 (new episodes 2019)	Manhattan
The Real World	1992		1992 and 2001 in Manhattan; 2009 in Brooklyn
Living Single	1993	1998	Prospect Heights, Brooklyn
The Nanny	1993	1999	Upper East Side
NYPD Blue	1993	2005	
704 Hauser	1994		Astoria, Queens
The George Carlin Show	1994	1995	
New York Undercover	1994	1995	
The Cosby Mysteries	1994	1995	
The Critic	1994	1995	
Gargoyles	1994	1997	Critically acclaimed Disney animated series
Spider-Man: The Animated Series	1994	1998	
Friends	1994	2004	Greenwich Village, Manhattan
Dr. Katz, Professional Therapist	1995	2002	
Can't Hurry Love	1995		
Double Rush	1995		
High Society	1995		
New York News	1995		
Caroline in the City	1995	1999	
NewsRadio	1995	1999	Manhattan
The Parent 'Hood	1995	1999	
The Wayans Bros.	1995	1999	
Central Park West	1996		
Love and Marriage	1996		Manhattan
Waynehead	1996	1997	Manhattan
Cosby	1996	2000	Greenwich Village, Manhattan
Spin City	1996	2002	
Brooklyn South	1997	1998	Brooklyn
Fired Up	1997	1998	
Just Shoot Me!	1997	2003	
Sex and the City	1997	2004	Manhattan
Veronica's Closet	1997	2000	
City Guys	1997	2001	
Felicity	1998	2002	
Total Request Live	1998	2008	Times Square
Cousin Skeeter	1998	2003	
Becker	1998	2004	The Bronx
Sports Night	1998	2000	Manhattan
That's Life	1998		
Will & Grace	1998	2020	First run-1998-2006; Second run-2017–2020
The King of Queens	1998	2007	in Rego Park, Queens
Law & Order: Special Victims Unit	1999	present	
Futurama	1999	present	Set a thousand years in the future in New New York, built above the ruins of the old.
Mike, Lu & Og	1999	2002	Mike was born in Manhattan
Downtown	1999		
Station Zero	1999		
Third Watch	1999	2005	
The Daily Show with Jon Stewart	1999	2015	
Where I Live	1993		Harlem, Manhattan

=== 2000s ===
Title	Start	End	Comment
The $treet	2000		
The 10th Kingdom	2000		
Seven Little Monsters	2000	2003	
Welcome to New York	2000	2001	
Law & Order: Criminal Intent	2001	2011	
Grounded for Life	2001	2005	on Staten Island
The Job	2001	2002	
Animal Precinct	2001	2008	
24	2001	2010	only season 8 was set in N.Y.
Family Affair	2002	2003	
Less Than Perfect	2002	2006	Manhattan and Brooklyn
What I Like About You	2002	2006	
Without a Trace	2002	2009	
America's Next Top Model	2003	present	seasons 1–3, 10, 12 and 14
Tarzan	2003		
Spider-Man: The New Animated Series	2003		
Teenage Mutant Ninja Turtles	2003	2009	
Tru Calling	2003	2005	
The Apprentice	2004	2017	all seasons (except season 6)
The Jury	2004		
CSI: NY	2004	2013	
Rescue Me	2004	2011	
Project Runway	2004	present	
Law & Order: Trial by Jury	2005	2006	
Blind Justice	2005		
Everybody Hates Chris	2005	2009	Bedford-Stuyvesant, Brooklyn
How I Met Your Mother	2005	2014	Upper West Side
Jake in Progress	2005	2006	
American Dragon: Jake Long	2005	2007	
Related	2005	2006	
The Colbert Report	2005	2014	
The Bedford Diaries	2006		
Conviction	2006		
30 Rock	2006	2013	
Ugly Betty	2006	2010	Manhattan and Jackson Heights, Queens
America's Got Talent	2006	present	seasons 8–10
Heroes	2006	2010	
Gossip Girl	2007	2012	Upper East Side
Rules of Engagement	2007	2013	
Fast Money	2007	present	NASDAQ, Times Square
Dirty Sexy Money	2007	2009	
Flight of the Conchords	2007	2009	
Damages	2007	2012	
Mad Men	2007	2015	Filmed in Los Angeles
Wizards of Waverly Place	2007	2012	Filmed in Hollywood, California, set in Greenwich Village
The Naked Brothers Band	2007	2009	
The Return of Jezebel James	2008		
New Amsterdam	2008		
Canterbury's Law	2008		
Cashmere Mafia	2008		
Life on Mars	2008	2009	
Three Delivery	2008	2009	
The Spectacular Spider-Man	2008	2009	
Lipstick Jungle	2008	2009	
True Jackson, VP	2008	2011	
Fringe	2008	2013	Set in our universe and a parallel universe
The Real Housewives of New York City	2008	present	
Castle (TV series)	2009	2016	
Sherri	2009		
Nurse Jackie	2009	2015	
The Electric Company	2009	2011	
White Collar	2009	2014	Mostly Midtown, and upper West side, Manhattan
Glee	2009	2015	Half of the series 4 storyline is set in New York
Bored to Death	2009	2011	
Archer	2009	2023	With the exception of S7 in Los Angeles and S8-10 fictional places

=== 2010s ===
Title	Start	End	Comment
Blue Bloods	2010	2024	Staten Island, Manhattan
How to Make It in America	2010	2011	
Scrappers	2010		
Oddities	2010	2014	
Boardwalk Empire	2010	2014	
Mad Love	2011		
Impractical Jokers	2011	present	
The Avengers: Earth's Mightiest Heroes	2010	2013	
Suits	2011	2019	Filmed in Toronto, Ontario, Canada
2 Broke Girls	2011	2017	Williamsburg, Brooklyn
A Gifted Man	2011	2012	
Louie	2011	2015	Manhattan
Jessie	2011	2015	Manhattan
Person of Interest	2011	2016	
Unforgettable	2011	2014	
Smash	2012	2013	
I Just Want My Pants Back	2011	2012	
Girls	2012	2017	Marnie and Hannah live in Greenpoint, Brooklyn; Jessa and Shoshanna live in NoLita; Adam lives in Prospect Heights, Brooklyn
Breakout Kings	2011	2012	Brooklyn
Ultimate Spider-Man	2012	2017	
Teenage Mutant Ninja Turtles	2012	2017	
Don't Trust the B— in Apartment 23	2012	2013	
Elementary	2012	2019	
The Mindy Project	2012	2017	
666 Park Ave.	2012	2013	
Baby Daddy	2012	2017	
Made in Jersey	2012		
The Following	2013	2015	
The Carrie Diaries	2013	2014	
Deception	2013		
Golden Boy	2013		
Inside Amy Schumer	2013	2016	
Orange Is the New Black	2013	2019	
Hostages	2013	2014	
The Michael J. Fox Show	2013	2014	
Brooklyn Nine-Nine	2013	2021	
Sleepy Hollow	2013	2017	Takes place in Sleepy Hollow, New York, present and Revolutionary war era
Ironside	2013		
Alpha House	2013	2014	Amazon Web Series
Last Week Tonight with John Oliver	2014	present	
Believe	2014		
The Knick	2014	2017	
Mozart in the Jungle	2014	2018	
Taxi Brooklyn	2014		
Power	2014	2020	
Broad City	2014	2019	Astoria, Queens (Abbi's Apartment), Gowanus, Brooklyn (Ilana's Apartment), Manhattan
Girl Meets World	2014	2017	Greenwich Village, Manhattan
Manhattan Love Story	2014	2014	
Forever	2014	2015	
Jackson Heights	2014	2015	
The Mysteries of Laura	2014	2016	
The Affair	2014	2019	
The Jim Gaffigan Show	2015	2016	Greenwich Village
Quantico	2015	2018	
Younger	2015	2019	
The Slap	2015		
Empire	2015	2020	
Allegiance	2015		
The Nightly Show with Larry Wilmore	2015	2016	
Unbreakable Kimmy Schmidt	2015	2019	
Mr. Robot	2015	2019	
Limitless	2015	2016	
Agent Carter	2015	2016	
Game Shakers	2015	2019	
Master of None	2015	2017	
Blindspot	2015	2020	
Daredevil	2015	2018	Hell's Kitchen, Manhattan
Jessica Jones	2015	2019	Hell's Kitchen, Manhattan
3AM	2015		
Horace and Pete	2016		Brooklyn
Animals	2016	2018	
The Night Of	2016		
Conviction	2016	2017	
The Get Down	2016	2017	Bronx
Feed the Beast	2016		The Bronx
Luke Cage	2016	2018	Harlem
High Maintenance	2016	2020	Brooklyn
Iron Fist	2017	2018	Manhattan
The Defenders	2017		
The Punisher	2017	2019	Queens
Marvel's Spider-Man	2017	2020	
Friends from College	2017	2019	Manhattan
The Deuce	2017	2019	
Crashing	2017	2019	
The Marvelous Mrs. Maisel	2017	2023	Upper West Side, Manhattan in 1958.
The Bold Type	2017	2021	
Banana Fish	2018		Japanese anime series based on the manga by Akimi Yoshida
Pose	2018	2021	
The Last O.G.	2018	2021	Brooklyn
You	2018	present	Only season 1 was set in N.Y.; location changed to Los Angeles in Season 2, Set to return to NYC for its 5th and Final Season
Succession	2018	2023	
El Barón	2019		
The Boys	2019	present	
The Morning Show	2019	present	
Sunnyside	2019		Sunnyside, Queens
Almost Family	2019	2020	
Russian Doll	2019	2022	Alphabet City, Manhattan
What We Do In the Shadows	2019	2024	Staten Island

=== 2020s ===
Title	Start	End	Comment
High Fidelity	2020		Crown Heights, Brooklyn
Katy Keene	2020		Alphabet City, Manhattan
The Undoing	2020		
Grand Army	2020		
Dash & Lily	2020		
Awkwafina is Nora from Queens	2020	2023	Queens
Love Life	2020	2021	
Central Park	2020	2022	
How To with John Wilson	2020	2023	
Betty	2020	2021	
The Equalizer	2021		
I Heart Arlo	2021		
Gossip Girl	2021		
Only Murders in the Building	2021		
How I Met Your Father	2022		
The Gilded Age	2022		
The Boys Presents: Diabolical	2022		
Barbie: It Takes Two	2022		
Uncoupled	2022		
Partner Track	2022		
The Walking Dead: Dead City	2023		
The Horror of Dolores Roach	2023		
The Other Black Girl	2023		
Elsbeth	2024		
Your Friendly Neighborhood Spider-Man	2025		
Daredevil: Born Again	2025		Hell's Kitchen, Manhattan
Ratu Ratu Queens: The Series	2025		Queens
Adults	2025		
Dexter: Resurrection	2025		

== Shows set primarily in other parts of the New York metropolitan area ==
- The Goldbergs (see above: moved to Haverville, New York, in final season)
- I Love Lucy (see above: moved to Westport, Connecticut, in 1957 season)
- The Dick Van Dyke Show (1961–1966, New Rochelle in Westchester County, with workplace scenes in Manhattan)
- The Facts of Life 1979–1988, Peekskill, New York
- Bewitched (1964–1972, Westport, Connecticut, with workplace scenes in Manhattan)
- The Don Rickles Show (1972, Long Island)
- Maude (1972–1978, Tuckahoe in Westchester County)
- Who's the Boss? (1984–1992, Connecticut)
- Growing Pains (1985–1992, Huntington in Long Island)
- Dear John (1988–1992, New Rochelle in Westchester County)
- Everybody Loves Raymond (1996–2005, Lynbrook on Long Island)
- The Sopranos (1999–2007, North Caldwell, New Jersey, with occasional scenes in Manhattan)
- As Told by Ginger (2000-2006, based on Larchmont, New York, set in Western Connecticut)
- Gilmore Girls (2000–2007); in Western Connecticut, some episodes in New York City
- That's Life (2000–2002, fictional Bellefield, New Jersey, ostensibly Belleville or Bloomfield)
- My Wife and Kids (2001–2005, Stamford, Connecticut)
- Megas XLR (2004–2005, New Jersey)
- House (2004–2012, fictional "Princeton-Plainsboro Teaching Hospital" in New Jersey; Princeton and Plainsboro are two adjacent towns within the New York metropolitan area.)
- Animal House (2005–2006 in Port Washington, part of Long Island)
- The Book of Daniel (2006), fictional Newbury in Westchester
- Kevin Can Wait (2016–2018, Massapequa, Long Island)

See: The Five Boroughs, New York metropolitan area, Tri-State Region

== Miniseries, specials or individual episodes ==
- Xiaolin Showdown
  - "My Homey Omi"
- Ben 10
  - "Kevin 11"
- Doctor Who
  - "Daleks in Manhattan / Evolution of the Daleks"
  - "The Angels Take Manhattan"
  - "The Return of Doctor Mysterio"
- Gamer's Guide to Pretty Much Everything
  - "The Big City"
- iCarly
  - "iShock America"
- Modern Family
  - "A Tale of Three Cities"
- Pretty Little Liars
  - "'A' Is for Answers"
  - "Escape from New York"
- Totally Spies!
  - "Green with N.V."
  - "Dog Show Showdown"
  - "Zooney World"
- James Bond Jr.
  - "The Eiffel Missile"
  - "A Deranged Mind"
- Suits
  - "Pilot"
- The Office (U.S. TV series)
  - "Valentine's Day (The Office)"
  - "Night Out (The Office)"
  - "The Deposition (The Office)"
  - "Crime Aid"
- Leah Remini: It's All Relative
  - New York City Part 1
  - New York City Part 2
- Transformers: The Headmasters
  - "Terror! The Six Shadows"
- Postcards from Buster
  - "Postcards from Buster" (Arthur Episode)
  - "A City View"
  - "A Bridge Back Home"
- SpongeBob SquarePants
  - "Goons on the Moon"
- Transformers: Super-God Masterforce
  - "BlackZarak – Destroyer from Space"
- The Simpsons
  - The City of New York vs. Homer Simpson
- Danger Rangers
  - "Wild Wheels"
  - "Fires and Liars"
- Entourage
  - "Return to Queens Blvd."
- The Orville
  - "Old Wounds" aka Pilot (Set 400 years into future)
- We Bare Bears
  - "Baby Orphan Ninja Bears"
- Courage the Cowardly Dog
  - "Courage in the Big Stinkin' City"
  - "Mega Muriel the Magnificent"
- "The Grand Tour"
  - "The Falls Guys"
- Scooby-Doo and Guess Who?
  - "The New York Underground!"
- Doki
  - "The Sky's the Limit"
- World of Winx
  - "The Legend of the Crocodile Man"
- Planet Earth II
  - "Cities"
- Planet Earth III
  - "Human"
- Liberty's Kids
  - "New York, New York"
  - "The Turtle"
  - "Going Home"
- Be Cool, Scooby-Doo!
  - "Worst in Show"
- Heathcliff
  - The New York City Sewer System
- Drain the Oceans
  - "Secrets of New York City"
- DMZ
- Full Circle
- The Continental: From the World of John Wick
- The Crowded Room

== See also ==
- List of television shows filmed in New York City
- List of movies set in New York City
- List of television shows set in Los Angeles
- List of television shows set in Washington, D.C.
- List of television shows set in Chicago
- List of television shows set in San Francisco
- List of television shows set in Miami
