= List of television shows filmed in New York City =

This page provides a partial list of television shows shooting in New York City.

In 2011, 23 TV shows were shot in New York while only nine shows were a decade before.

== Shows filmed primarily on location and/or using studio facilities in the Five Boroughs ==
- 3AM (2015)
- 30 Rock (2006–2013)
- 666 Park Ave. (2012–2013)
- All My Children (1970–2009) - moved to Los Angeles in 2010
- America's Got Talent (2012–2015)
- The Americans (2013–2018)
- Another World (1964–1999)
- Armstrong Circle Theater
- Arthur Godfrey and His Friends
- Arthur Godfrey's Talent Scouts
- As the World Turns (1956–2010)
- The Bedford Diaries (2006)
- The Black Donnellys (2006–2007)
- Blue Bloods (2010–2024)
- Boardwalk Empire (2010–2014)
- Bored to Death (2009–2011)
- Broad City (2014–2019)
- Calucci's Department (September–December 1973)
- Captain Kangaroo (1955–1984)
- Car 54, Where Are You? (1961–1963)
- The Carrie Diaries (2012–2014)
- Cashmere Mafia (2008)
- The Colbert Report (2005–2014)
- Conviction (2006)
- Cosby (1996–2000)
- The Cosby Mysteries (1994–1995)
- The Cosby Show (1984–1992)
- Crashing (2017–2019)
- The Daily Show
- Damages (2007–2012)
- The Days and Nights of Molly Dodd (1989–1991)
- The Defenders (2010–2011)
- Delocated (2000–2013)
- The Dick Cavett Show
- Dick Clark's New Year's Rockin' Eve (1972–present)
- The Dr. Oz Show
- East Side/West Side
- The Ed Sullivan Show
- The Edge of Night (1956–1984)
- Elementary (2012–2019)
- The Equalizer (1985–1989)
- The Following (2013–2015)
- Flight of the Conchords (2007–2009)
- Fringe (2008–2013)
- A Gifted Man (2011–2012)
- Girls (2012–2017)
- The Goldbergs (1949–1956)
- Golden Boy (2013)
- The Good Wife (2009–2016)
- Gossip Girl (2007–2012)
- Gotham (2014–2019)
- Guiding Light (1952–August 14, 2009) - since 2008, shooting 1/5 of its scenes on location in Peapack, New Jersey
- Heroes (2006–2010)
- The Honeymooners (1955–1956)
- Hope & Faith (2003–2006)
- How to Make It in America (2010–2011)
- In Treatment (2009–2010)
- Inside Amy Schumer (2013–2016)
- Daredevil (2015–2018)
- Jessica Jones (2015–2018)
- Luke Cage (2016–2018)
- Iron Fist (2017–2018)
- Jessie (2011-2015)
- The Job (2001–2002)
- The Jury (2004)
- Kate and Allie (1984–1989)
- Kings (2009)
- Kraft Television Theatre
- Last Week Tonight with John Oliver (2014–present)
- Late Night with David Letterman (1982–1993)
- Late Night with Conan O'Brien (1993–2009)
- Late Night with Jimmy Fallon (2009–2014)
- Late Night with Seth Meyers (2014–present)
- Late Show with David Letterman (1993–2015)
- The Late Show with Stephen Colbert (2015–present)
- Law & Order (1990–2010; 2022-)
- Law & Order: Criminal Intent (2001–2011)
- Law & Order: Organized Crime (2021–)
- Law & Order: Special Victims Unit (1999–present)
- Law & Order: Trial by Jury (2005)
- Life on Mars (2008–2009)
- Lipstick Jungle (2008)
- Live (1983–present)
- Louie (2010–2015)
- Love & Hip Hop (2011–Present)
- Love Monkey (2006)
- Love of Life (1951–80)
- Love Life (2021–Present)
- Made in Jersey (2012)
- Mama (1949–1957)
- Manifest (2018–2023)
- Martha Stewart
- Master of None
- The Merv Griffin Show (1965–1970)
- Mob Wives (2011)
- Naked City (1958–1963)
- New Amsterdam (2008)
- New York Undercover (1994–1998)
- The Newsroom (2012–2014)
- Nurse Jackie (2009–2015)
- NYC 22 (2011–2012)
- N.Y.P.D. (1967–1969)
- One Life to Live (1968–2011; series last aired in 2012)
- Once Upon a Time (2011–2018)
- Orange Is the New Black (2013–2019)
- Pan Am (2011–2012)
- The Patty Duke Show (1963–1966) - production moved to Los Angeles midway through final season
- The Phil Silvers Show (AKA: You'll Never Get Rich) (1955-1959) Final season shot in Los Angeles.
- Person of Interest (2011–2016)
- Rescue Me (2004–2010)
- Royal Pains (2009–2016)
- Ryan's Hope (1975–1989)
- Saturday Night Live (1975–present)
- Search for Tomorrow (1951–1986)
- The Secret Storm (1954–1974)
- Sesame Street (1969–present)
- Sex and the City (1998–2004)
- Shining Time Station (1989) - after season one, shooting in Toronto
- Smash (2012–2013)
- Spin City (1996–2002) - after season four, filming in Los Angeles
- Stage Show (1954–1956)
- Stanley (1956–1957)
- Third Watch (1999–2005)
- Today (1952–present)
- The Tonight Show (1954–1972, 2014–)
  - Tonight Starring Steve Allen (1954–1957)
  - Tonight! America After Dark (1957)
  - Tonight Starring Jack Paar (1957–1962)
  - The Tonight Show Starring Johnny Carson (1962–1972) - moved to Burbank, California in 1972
  - The Tonight Show Starring Jimmy Fallon (2014–present)
- The Wendy Williams Show (2008–2022)
- Ugly Betty (2006–2010) - pilot and season 3 onward
- Unbreakable Kimmy Schmidt (2015–2019)
- Unforgettable (2011–2016)
- The United States Steel Hour (1953–1963)
- Wallflowers (2012–present) - web series
- Watch What Happens Live (2009–present)
- Westinghouse Studio One
- White Collar (2009–2014)

== Shows filmed using studio facilities in the Five Boroughs but with significant location shooting elsewhere ==
- The Sopranos (1999–2007) - Silvercup Studios in Queens, most location shooting in New Jersey, some in New York City
- The Book of Daniel (2006) - Silvercup Studios in Queens, various suburban locations, church scenes at All Saints Church, Pasadena, California

== Shows filmed primarily elsewhere but have some location shooting in the Five Boroughs ==
All with primary filming in Los Angeles-area studios, unless otherwise noted.

- Becker (1998–2004)
- Blind Justice (2005)
- Brooklyn South (1997–1998)
- CSI: NY (2004–2013)
- Friends (1994–2004)
- How I Met Your Mother (2005–2014)
- Kojak (1973–1978)
- Mad About You (1992–1999)
- McCloud (1970–1977)
- NYPD Blue (1993–2005)
- The Odd Couple (1970–1975)
- Rules of Engagement (2007–2013)
- Seinfeld (1989–1998)
- Suits (2011–2016) - primary filming in Toronto
- Will & Grace (1998–2006)

== See also ==
- List of fiction set in Chicago
- List of films and television shows set in Miami
- List of films set in New York City
- List of television shows set in Los Angeles
- List of television shows set in New York City
- List of television shows set in Washington, D.C.
- San Francisco in popular culture
