= List of Caroline in the City episodes =

The following is a list of episodes for the American television sitcom Caroline in the City, which ran from September 21, 1995, to April 26, 1999, on NBC.

== Series overview ==
Season	Episodes	Originally released		Rank	Rating
Season	Episodes	First released	Last released	Rank	Rating
1	24	September 21, 1995	August 5, 1996	4	18.0
2	25	September 17, 1996	May 13, 1997	25	11.0
3	26	September 22, 1997	May 18, 1998	47	8.4
4	22	September 21, 1998	April 26, 1999	91	8.8

== Episodes ==
=== Season 1 (1995–96) ===
No. overall	No. in season	Title	Directed by	Written by	Original release date	Prod. code	Viewers (millions)
1	1	"The Pilot"	James Burrows	Fred Barron & Marco Pennette & Dottie Dartland	September 21, 1995	5701	30.4
Caroline hires Richard. He pretends to be her date in an effort to make Del jealous.
2	2	"Caroline and the Mugger"	James Burrows	Dottie Dartland	September 28, 1995	102	27.1
Richard is mugged.
3	3	"Caroline and the Gay Art Show"	James Burrows	Ian Praiser	October 5, 1995	105	27.5
Richard enters an art show, only to later discover that it is only for gay artists.
4	4	"Caroline and the Bad Back"	James Burrows	Bill Prady	October 12, 1995	101	26.5
Caroline injures her back and becomes high on painkillers. Richard and Del create a comic for her. David Hyde Pierce and Jane Leeves cameo as their Frasier characters, Niles Crane and Daphne Moon, respectively.
5	5	"Caroline and the ATM"	Rod Daniel	Mark Wilding & Jennifer Glickman	October 19, 1995	107	27.1
The ATM fails to give Caroline her money, but when she goes to the bank and they need to watch the video of the transaction, she is too embarrassed as she picked her nose on camera.
6	6	"Caroline and the Folks"	James Burrows	Marco Pennette & Fred Barron	November 2, 1995	106	26.9
Caroline goes to Remo's to meet Del's parents. Richard reaches his 30th birthday. Annie goes to his apartment. Jonathan Silverman makes a cameo appearance as Jonathan Eliot from The Single Guy. Matthew Perry makes a cameo as Chandler Bing from Friends.
7	7	"Caroline and the Opera"	Tom Cherones	Story by : Carol Gary; Teleplay by : Marco Pennette & Fred Barron & Dottie Dartland	November 9, 1995	109	29.6
Caroline goes to see The Marriage of Figaro with an old friend from Wisconsin. Del becomes jealous and asks Richard to teach him about the opera.
8	8	"Caroline and the Balloon"	Tom Cherones	Bill Prady	November 16, 1995	108	27.6
Caroline gets her own balloon in the Macy's Thanksgiving Day Parade. Caroline, Richard, Del, and Annie are volunteer rope pullers.
9	9	"Caroline and the Convict"	Rod Daniel	Ellen Idelson & Rob Lotterstein	December 7, 1995	104	27.3
Annie dates Steven, an ex-convict. He burglarizes Caroline's apartment, and steals one of Richard's paintings.
10	10	"Caroline and the Christmas Break"	James Burrows	Michelle Nader & Amy Cohen	December 14, 1995	110	26.6
Del and Caroline plan a trip to Paris, but after opening his big mouth Caroline decides to break up with him.
11	11	"Caroline and the Gift"	James Burrows	Bill Prady	January 4, 1996	111	28.5
Caroline believes Del bought her an expensive gift, which turned out be much more modest than she thought. Richard paints a nude of a Mobster's girlfriend. Annie tries to find a man she met at a New Year's Eve party.
12	12	"Caroline and the Married Man"	Tom Cherones	Wil Calhoun	January 11, 1996	113	27.5
Richard sets Caroline up on a date in order to increase his chances of getting an art commission, but it backfires upon realizing that he is married.
13	13	"Caroline and the Twenty-Eight-Pound Walleye"	Tom Cherones	Ian Praiser & Carol Gary	January 25, 1996	114	25.9
Caroline returns to her hometown of Peshtigo, Wisconsin, where a park is dedicated to her. Her brother Chris steals the limelight away from her once again, however.
14	14	"Caroline and the Watch"	James Burrows	Mark Wilding	February 1, 1996	112	29.4
Caroline buys an antique desk on the way to the deli, and later finds a watch gift wrapped inside. She tracks down the old owners.
15	15	"Caroline and the Bad Date"	Tom Cherones	Dottie Dartland & Bill Prady	February 15, 1996	115	27.1
Annie convinces Caroline to ask out a man shopping for shirts at the mall. He turns out to be paranoid. She mets Del at Remo's and they sleep together.
16	16	"Caroline and the Proposal"	James Burrows	Fred Barron & Marco Pennette & Ian Praiser	February 22, 1996	117	27.3
Caroline decides whether or not to accept Del's marriage proposal. Remo and Annie tell her Richard has feeling for her. Richard visits a temp agency looking for work.
17	17	"Caroline and the Kid"	Tom Cherones	Jay Scherick & Bill Masters & Wil Calhoun	March 14, 1996	116	23.8
Caroline and Richard paint a devilish child's room.
18	18	"Caroline and the Ex-Wife"	Tom Cherones	Michelle Nader & Amy Cohen	March 28, 1996	118	27.2
Caroline and Del go to his cabin in Vermont, only to find his second ex-wife and her boyfriend.
19	19	"Caroline and the Movie"	Tom Cherones	Bill Prady	April 4, 1996	122	26.7
Caroline, Richard, and Annie are extras in a movie.
20	20	"Caroline and the Cereal"	Pamela Fryman	Story by : Ian Praiser & Michelle Nader & Amy Cohen & Rob Lotterstein & Ellen Idelson; Teleplay by : Ian Praiser & Michelle Nader & Amy Cohen	April 18, 1996	121	22.8
Caroline gets her own cereal, but everything is ruined when Richard realizes that it looks like something else.
21	21	"Caroline and Richard's Mom"	James Burrows	Charles Harper Yates & Dottie Dartland	April 25, 1996	120	25.1
Richard's mother visits Caroline's apartment.
22	22	"Caroline and the Bridesmaids"	Tom Cherones	Wil Calhoun & Bill Masters	May 9, 1996	119	24.8
Annie does a sub-par job of being Caroline's maid of honor.
23	23	"Caroline and the Wedding"	James Burrows	Bill Masters	May 16, 1996	123	29.3
Caroline gets cold feet as her wedding nears. Meanwhile, Richard writes her a love letter and leaves it on a pile of thank you notes. Caroline never opens the letter, but Richard leaves New York believing she had and rejected him.
24	24	"Caroline and the Condom"	James Burrows	Fred Barron & Marco Pennette	August 5, 1996	103	15.7
A flashback show showing events from shortly after Richard was hired. The events of this episode are out of order from the first season finale and the second season premiere.

=== Season 2 (1996–97) ===
No. overall	No. in season	Title	Directed by	Written by	Original release date	Prod. code	Viewers (millions)
25	1	"Caroline and the Younger Man: Part 1"	James Burrows	Fred Barron & Marco Pennette	September 17, 1996	202	19.23
Richard fails to sell enough paintings to live in Paris and returns to New York. Caroline takes Salty to the vet. The episode ends with Caroline finding Richard as he is moving into his new apartment.
26	2	"Caroline and the Letter: Part 2"	Gordon Hunt	Fred Barron & Marco Pennette & Cathy Ladman	September 24, 1996	203	17.92
Richard finds out that Caroline never read his love letter, and tries to retrieve it before anyone sees it. He visits the apartment of Caroline's pregnant friend Vicky, throws the box of thanks you notes out the window, and helps Caroline deliver Vicky's baby. Annie finds his love letter on the street, and at the end of the episode plans to show it Caroline. Richard convinces her otherwise, saying it would only cause needless pain.
27	3	"Caroline and the Cat Dancer"	Michael Lembeck	Jack Kenny & Brian Hargrove	October 15, 1996	201	14.7
Annie has back taxes due, and agrees to help an IRS agent played by David Hyde Pierce perform in Cats.
28	4	"Caroline and the Guy Who Gets There Too Soon"	Gordon Hunt	Donald Todd	October 22, 1996	204	14.3
Joe professes his love for Caroline.
29	5	"Caroline and the Dreamers"	Gordon Hunt	Bill Prady	October 29, 1996	206	15.7
Del starts his own greeting card company, Eagle Greeting Cards, and Caroline reluctantly joins. Meanwhile, Richard paints a mural in a shady part of town.
30	6	"Caroline and the Nice Jewish Boy"	Will Mackenzie	Tom Leopold	November 12, 1996	210	18.94
Caroline receives an award, but Joe refuses to attend the ceremony because one of the sponsors makes mink coats. After failing to find another date, Richard agrees to go with Caroline. Meanwhile, Del pretends to be Jewish to get a date.
31	7	"Caroline and Victor/Victoria"	Howard Deutch	Bill Masters	November 19, 1996	209	17.22
Annie tries out for Julie Andrews' understudy, complete with stogie. First episode directed by Lea Thompson's real-life husband, Howard Deutch.
32	8	"Caroline and the Comic"	Howard Deutch	Fred Barron & Marco Pennette	November 26, 1996	211	16.32
Caroline goes to see Richard's father, a shoe salesman and former stand up comedian. Judd Hirsch guest stars.
33	9	"Caroline and the Therapist"	Gordon Hunt	Tom Leopold	December 3, 1996	205	16.46
Joe gives Caroline the phone number of a cat therapist, who determines that Salty's odd behavior is the result of being around Richard. Richard goes to see his 3rd grade teacher, who had told him he was bad with animals.
34	10	"Caroline and the Red Sauce"	James Burrows	Bill Prady	December 10, 1996	208	14.5
Annie's mother Angie (Candice Azzara) comes to visit, saying there are termites in her house. Caroline discovers there may be more to this than it seems.
35	11	"Caroline and the Freight King"	Gordon Hunt	Donald Todd	December 17, 1996	207	14.6
Caroline gets locked in the laundry room of her building with a homeless man. Del tries to get Richard to create greeting cards for him. Annie keeps finding the same $5 bill with the word 'Repent' on it.
36	12	"Caroline and the Perfect Record"	Michael Zinberg	Dottie Dartland	January 7, 1997	212	17.67
Annie's record of never having been stood up is broken. Meanwhile, Joe's ex-girlfriend Lisa comes back into town and moves back into his apartment (which was in Lisa's name), which makes Caroline determined to tell Joe to move out.
37	13	"Caroline and the Singer"	Will Mackenzie	Jack Kenny & Brian Hargrove	January 14, 1997	214	17.30
Annie's sister Donna (Mackenzie Phillips) is visiting and cannot come up with a new song to relaunch her career. After finding Richard's love letter to Caroline in Annie's diary, she wants to use it for the lyrics to her new song, to Richard's dismay. Meanwhile, Caroline is unable to find her black pumps, and returns to Joe's apartment in search of them.
38	14	"Caroline and the Kept Man"	Andrew Tsao	Jeff Abugov	January 21, 1997	213	16.76
Richard's work is exhibited in a country club, thanks to Del. A fan of his work decides to become his patron but requires him to give up his job with Caroline.
39	15	"Caroline and the Long Shot"	Will Mackenzie	Dottie Dartland	February 11, 1997	217	13.68
Richard has a chance to win $100,000 by making a 3 point shot at a Knicks game, but he has never played basketball before.
40	16	"Caroline and the Dearly Departed"	James Burrows	Jack Kenny & Brian Hargrove	February 18, 1997	219	13.47
Richard pretends to be dead to further his career.
41	17	"Caroline and the Getaway"	James Burrows	Daniel Henriks	February 25, 1997	218	15.02
Caroline and Annie go to a ski resort, vowing not to search for dates while there. Richard tries to date a woman who followed him from a bookstore.
42	18	"Caroline and the Monkeys"	Andrew Tsao	Donald Todd	March 11, 1997	216	15.99
A former classmate of Annie's comes to visit.
43	19	"Caroline and the Buyer"	Will Mackenzie	Jeff Abugov	April 1, 1997	215	15.50
Del tries to convince Bob Anderson, the owner of Card Village, to carry Caroline in the City cards.
44	20	"Caroline and the New Neighbor"	Michael Zinberg	Christopher Fife	April 8, 1997	220	13.43
Richard becomes an illegal taxi driver, while Caroline helps an elderly neighbor dispose of her husband's body.
45	21	"Caroline and the Critics"	Will Mackenzie	Dottie Dartland & Tom Leopold & Bill Prady & Jack Kenny & Brian Hargrove	April 15, 1997	223	14.16
Unaware of why a small town in upper New York has decided to drop her comic strip, Caroline and Richard go on a road trip to find out, only to have their car break down.
46	22	"Caroline and the Ombudsman"	Will Mackenzie	Bill Prady	April 22, 1997	221	15.08
Caroline hires an ombudsman to talk to her super.
47	23	"Caroline and the Bad Trip: Part 1"	Michael Zinberg	Donald Todd	May 6, 1997	222	12.92
Caroline goes on The Tonight Show with Jay Leno. Richard sees his long lost girlfriend Julia.
48	24	"Caroline and Richard & Julia: Part 2"	Will Mackenzie	Bill Masters	May 13, 1997	224	15.44
Caroline pretends to be Richard's wife. Annie goes to LA to do a sitcom with Shadoe Stevens. Del tries to keep his business from going bankrupt.
49	25	"Caroline and the Wayward Husband: Part 3"	Will Mackenzie	Kim Friese	May 13, 1997	225	17.05
Richard goes downstairs to get some aspirin, and ends up kissing Julia. Caroline catches them and reacts badly. Caroline leaves a message on Richard's answering machine, only to have Julia erase it.

=== Season 3 (1997–98) ===
No. overall	No. in season	Title	Directed by	Written by	Original release date	Prod. code	Viewers (millions)
50	1	"Caroline and the Reception"	James Burrows	Michael Sardo	September 22, 1997	301	17.98
Caroline throws a wedding reception for Richard and Julia to prove that she is not jealous and is over Richard.
51	2	"Caroline and the Kink"	James Burrows	Oliver Goldstick	September 29, 1997	302	13.84
Richard objects to the clothes Julia is buying for him to wear. Caroline advises him to stand up to Julia, but this causes Julia to walk out on him.
52	3	"Caroline and the Novelist"	Andrew Tsao	Jack Kenny & Brian Hargrove	October 6, 1997	304	12.90
Caroline goes on a date with a novelist whose book she claims to have read, but has not. Julia gets a job as a waitress at Remo's to make extra money, but is terrible at it.
53	4	"Caroline and the Free Cable"	Andrew Tsao	Nancy Steen	October 13, 1997	303	14.56
Caroline discovers that the whole building has been getting free cable from a connector in her apartment for which she has never paid. She goes to the cable company to volunteer to pay for it, much to Annie's annoyance.
54	5	"Caroline and the Blind Date"	Arlene Sanford	Michael Sardo	October 20, 1997	307	14.69
Caroline is set up with Trevor (Robert Gant) on a blind date at Happy Garden, a Chinese restaurant, but Richard and Julia accompany them and Richard interrupts everything Caroline and Trevor say.
55	6	"Caroline and the Egg"	Arlene Sanford	Nancy Steen	November 3, 1997	309	12.63
Richard's predecessor comes into town and asks Caroline to be an egg donor for her. Richard believes that his job is at risk and goes all out to make sure Caroline does not replace him with his predecessor.
56	7	"Caroline and the Desperate Cat"	Arlene Sanford	Michael Sardo & Oliver Goldstick	November 10, 1997	308	11.62
Annie's old vocal coach comes to town to see Annie in Cats. Annie is desperate to get back into Cats so that her teacher will see her perform.
57	8	"Caroline and the Cold Sesame Noodles"	James Burrows	Fred Barron & Marco Pennette	November 17, 1997	306	12.53
Richard buys Julia a wedding ring which goes missing after Caroline receives some Chinese takeaway. The delivery boy gets fired and ends up sleeping on Caroline's couch. Annie re-evaluates her feelings for a shy piano player who mistakenly thinks he had a date with her.
58	9	"Caroline and the Bitter Beast"	Shelley Jensen	Oliver Goldstick	November 24, 1997	311	12.04
Caroline and Trevor start dating again, but Trevor's dog refuses to accept Caroline. Caroline attempts to bond with the dog. Richard believes Marvin Hamlisch stole his childhood compositions. Hamlisch appears as himself.
59	10	"Caroline and the Councilman"	James Burrows	Lester Lewis	December 1, 1997	305	12.14
A councilman wants Caroline in the City to endorse his run for re-election, and also buys one of Richard's paintings. Caroline does not want to give a political endorsement, and Richard wants his painting back.
60	11	"Caroline and the Used Car Salesman"	Josh Baerwald	Daniel Henriks	December 8, 1997	312	13.49
Richard becomes a used car salesman to earn extra money to buy Christmas presents, but does not tell Caroline or Julia, leading both of them to believe he is having an affair.
61	12	"Caroline and the Decanter"	Will Mackenzie	Jodie Mann Massimi & Deborah Zoe Dawson	December 15, 1997	313	12.23
Caroline goes to Del's family's house for Christmas and brings a decanter as a gift for Del's mother, not realising that it was a gift from Del's mother in the first place.
62	13	"Caroline and the Love That Dares Not Speak its Name"	James Burrows	Jack Kenny & Brian Hargrove	January 5, 1998	315	13.91
Del and Charlie compete with Cassidy Greeting Cards at a greeting card convention and try to get Annie to help make their stall more attractive to customers.
63	14	"Caroline and the Quiz Show"	Will Mackenzie	Lester Lewis	January 12, 1998	314	12.70
Caroline is asked to go on a radio quiz show but has a fear of being put on the spot, so Julia tries to help.
64	15	"Caroline and the Reluctant Father"	Peter Chakos	Jim Halkett	January 19, 1998	310	11.86
Del meets up with an old one-night stand and finds out that he has a daughter.
65	16	"Caroline and the Outer Limits"	Will Mackenzie	Don Rhymer	January 26, 1998	316	11.22
Charlie narrates this episode, in which Caroline temporarily switches bodies with Julia and realises what Julia's life is like.
66	17	"Caroline and the Toothbrush"	Will Mackenzie	Kevin McMurtry	February 2, 1998	317	12.14
Trevor decides to leave a toothbrush at Caroline's house. Caroline struggles with the commitment that this implies, and Richard inadvertently interferes, putting Caroline and Trevor's relationship at risk.
67	18	"Caroline and the Cabbie"	Will Mackenzie	Nancy Steen	March 9, 1998	318	9.89
Caroline falls out with a rude cabbie and threatens to report him. Richard becomes addicted to the Internet. Meanwhile, Annie gets an appointment at a celebrity hairdresser's and Del and Charlie try to collect the remnants of cut celebrity hair so they can sell it.
68	19	"Caroline and the Visit from Mom"	Peter Chakos	Phil Parasoul & Nora Lynch	March 16, 1998	323	9.19
Richard goes on a gambling tour hoping to cash in on a free bus voucher without actually losing any money. Caroline's mother comes to visit and Annie is surprised by how well they get on, but Caroline reveals this is because they do not discuss any difficult subjects.
69	20	"Caroline and the Little White Lies"	Ted Wass	Nancy Steen	April 6, 1998	324	9.29
Del and Charlie pose as a gay couple to get cheaper health insurance, but the lie spirals out of control.
70	21	"Caroline and the Killer Dad"	Will Mackenzie	Michael Sardo	April 13, 1998	319	10.99
Caroline becomes convinced that Julia's dad is secretly trying to kill Richard. Meanwhile, Del changes a line in Caroline's cartoon without her knowledge but becomes alarmed after nobody thinks his new line is funny.
71	22	"Caroline and the Sandwich"	Shelley Jensen	Christopher Fife	April 20, 1998	322	11.10
New York's Stage Deli renames a sandwich (previously named after Jo Anne Worley) to name it after Caroline in the City. This leads to a backlash against Caroline. Jo Anne and Caroline stage a feud to maximise the publicity.
72	23	"Caroline and the Marriage Counselor: Part 1"	Shelley Jensen	Oliver Goldstick	May 4, 1998	320	12.17
Julia and Richard go to a marriage counselor, who tells Richard to quit and then applies for Richard's job.
73	24	"Caroline and the Marriage Counselor: Part 2"	Shelley Jensen	Oliver Goldstick	May 4, 1998	321	12.17
Julia and Richard's marriage counselor starts work as Richard's replacement but finds that everyone still wants him to give them relationship advice.
74	25	"Caroline and the Secret Bullfighter: Part 1"	Michael Zinberg	Gary Murphy & Neil Thompson	May 18, 1998	325	12.90
Richard and Julia host a party before leaving on holiday to Spain. After José, a bullfighter invited to the party, evinces an interest in Julia, Annie and Caroline see him in the bedroom having sex with a woman they believe to be Julia. After attempting to hide this from Richard, Caroline inadvertently tells him.
75	26	"Caroline and the Secret Bullfighter: Part 2"	Michael Zinberg	Michael Sardo	May 18, 1998	326	12.90
Caroline realises that the woman she saw with José was not Julia, and flies to Spain to tell Richard. Trevor, who has just moved in with Caroline, is not happy. Meanwhile, Del tries to impress a woman by helping her son with baseball.

=== Season 4 (1998–99) ===
No. overall	No. in season	Title	Directed by	Written by	Original release date	Prod. code	Viewers (millions)
76	1	"Caroline and the Guys in the Bathroom"	Ted Wass	Michael Sardo	September 21, 1998	401	11.29
Caroline goes to the bathroom to brush her teeth before kissing Richard, and is plagued by self-doubt as she is haunted by her former crushes and boyfriends. Eagle Greeting Cards is taken over by a larger company.
77	2	"Caroline and the Office"	Ted Wass	Gary Murphy & Neil Thompson	September 28, 1998	402	10.03
Julia's father throws Richard out of his home and takes all his possessions, so Richard ends up sleeping in Caroline's new office, in which Caroline refuses to work.
78	3	"Caroline and the Rotten Plum"	Ted Wass	Oliver Goldstick	October 5, 1998	403	9.48
Caroline falls out with Plum, the new office manager, when she wants to get a table removed from her office. Meanwhile, Annie discovers from her mother that her yoga instructor has previously done porn.
79	4	"Caroline and the Drycleaner"	Ted Wass	Jan Nash	October 12, 1998	404	11.15
Annie gets fired from Cats and goes out with her drycleaner to help her self-esteem. Caroline is asked to watch a focus group on Caroline in the City cards and tries to incorporate their ideas.
80	5	"Caroline and the First Date"	Ted Wass	Marcy Vosburgh	October 26, 1998	405	8.27
Del is put in charge of the company's Halloween party but is concerned that the people in charge in previous years have always been fired soon afterwards. Richard and Caroline set up a first date but have very different ideas of what to do, and Richard ends up in an altercation with a headwaitress (Jane Lynch) at Caroline's favourite restaurant.
81	6	"Caroline and the Paper Chase"	Ted Wass	Arlene Hellerman	November 2, 1998	406	12.42
Caroline accidentally discovers Richard's divorce papers in his desk at work, which Annie then reads. Due to a series of mishaps the divorce papers end up in the company's internal mail and Caroline and Annie end up running around the building looking for them.
82	7	"Caroline and the Big Night"	Howard Deutch	Tom Burkhard	November 9, 1998	407	8.36
Caroline and Richard go away and book a B&B for the big night when they are finally planning to sleep together. When they arrive they find that their room has been double-booked but Caroline becomes obsessed with the idea of getting the room back.
83	8	"Caroline and the Diva"	Howard Deutch	Jimmy Aleck & Jim Keily	November 16, 1998	408	6.73
Caroline and Annie plan to go to a concert to see an opera singer perform, but Richard also wants to take Caroline. As a result all three of them end up going. Meanwhile, Del is told to instruct Reg, one of the other cartoonists, to incorporate a white character into his all-black comic strip, and is promised a chance at going to the company's executive retreat.
84	9	"Caroline and the Booby Trap"	Ted Wass	Marcy Vosburgh	November 30, 1998	409	10.92
Annie considers getting a breast enhancement after getting frustrated with her lack of success at auditions. Caroline starts considering one as well.
85	10	"Caroline and the Bar Mitzvah"	Brent Carpenter	Jason Strouse	December 14, 1998	410	9.69
Richard's aunt offers him $5,000 to have the bar mitzvah he never had. Caroline gets angry with Richard for compromising his principles.
86	11	"Caroline and the Fright Before Christmas"	Ted Wass	Oliver Goldstick	December 21, 1998	411	6.04
Caroline gets angry with Del, Annie and Richard for not getting into the Christmas spirit, so they take her to a Christmas village.
87	12	"Caroline and the Big Bad Bed"	Ted Wass	Gary Murphy & Neil Thompson	January 11, 1999	412	9.69
Richard refuses to allow Caroline to add a bath mat to his bathroom. Caroline's fellow cartoonist Reg gets thrown out of his house and ends up staying in Richard's apartment. Meanwhile, Del and Annie start going to the gym together to pick up potential dates, but Annie is more successful than Del is.
88	13	"Caroline and the Horny Kid"	Ted Wass	Tom Burkhard	January 18, 1999	413	9.16
Caroline starts mentoring a boy at work, but he develops a crush on her.
89	14	"Caroline and the Firing Squad"	Shelley Jensen	Jimmy Aleck & Jim Keily	January 25, 1999	414	8.47
Spurred on by Caroline, Charlie insists on having a bigger say at work and attends a board meeting, to Del's alarm. Based on a recommendation from Richard, Annie gets a job modelling for a handsome cartoonist (Scott Lowell) as a character called Queen Neptuna.
90	15	"Caroline and Joanie and the Stick"	Ted Wass	Jason Strouse	Unaired	416	N/A
Joanie, Caroline's classmate from Peshtigo, unexpectedly shows up as Caroline and Richard are about to leave on holiday to Boston. Caroline tries to help her get her children's book published. Meanwhile, Del is insecure that his new girlfriend is taller than he is, and Annie babysits a parrot belonging to the guy from the mailroom at Caroline's office. This episode was not aired on NBC, but was included in the syndication package.
91	16	"Caroline and the Ancestral Home"	Ted Wass	Jan Nash	March 15, 1999	415	8.07
Caroline takes Del, Annie and Richard with her to go visit her parents in Peshtigo for their wedding anniversary, but pretends that she is still engaged to Del to please her grandmother. Caroline discovers that her childhood friend Randy has moved back to Peshtigo, which makes her think about whether she wants to stay in Manhattan forever or eventually move back to Peshtigo.
92	17	"Caroline and the 2000th Strip"	Claudia Weill	David Moses & Shari Brooks	March 8, 1999	417	7.26
Caroline is excited about attending a party to commemorate her 2000th strip but panics when she finds she cannot think of a story-line for the strip.
93	18	"Caroline and the Sudsy Guy"	Ted Wass	Tom Burkhard	March 22, 1999	418	8.28
Caroline's grandmother refuses to move out of her family home in Peshtigo, so Caroline flies there to convince her. She runs into Randy again, who has to help her when the washing machine overflows with suds. In the meanwhile, Richard is left in charge of a sick Annie and has to advise Del on his love life.
94	19	"Caroline and the Return of the Sudsy Guy"	Ted Wass	David Jay Willis & Stefanie Novik	March 29, 1999	419	7.80
Richard is given an opportunity to have his work exhibited. Meanwhile Randy flies to New York for a conference and ends up spending a lot of time with Caroline.
95	20	"Caroline and the Ultimatum"	Marco Pennette	Jan Nash & Oliver Goldstick	April 5, 1999	420	7.16
Caroline feels her relationship is drifting and gives Richard an ultimatum. Richard gets involved in a video store robbery and ends up locked in a storeroom and unable to ring Caroline.
96	21	"Caroline and El Niño"	Ted Wass	Gary Murphy & Neil Thompson	April 26, 1999	421	8.07
Julia's lawyer sends Richard an unwelcome surprise in the post and he and Caroline decide to go to Italy to deal with it.
97	22	"Caroline and the Big Move"	Ted Wass	Michael Sardo & Marco Pennette	April 26, 1999	422	8.07
As Caroline and Richard prepare to leave, Caroline is reluctant to go, and explains her reasons. Richard ends up in Italy for six months and Caroline struggles without him. Meanwhile Randy shows up again and discovers that Annie and Del are sleeping together. Six months later, Richard shows up at Caroline and Randy's wedding. This episode and the entire series ends with an unresolved cliffhanger.
