= Conrad Bloom =

1998 American television series

- Genre: Sitcom
- Created by: Marco Pennette
- Starring: Mark Feuerstein; Lauren Graham; Jessica Stone; Paula Newsome; Steve Landesberg; Linda Lavin; Ever Carradine
- Composer: Bruce Miller
- Country of origin: United States
- Original language: English
- No. of seasons: 1
- No. of episodes: 15 (6 unaired) (list of episodes)

Production
- Executive producers: Marco Pennette; Heide Perlman; James Burrows; Matthew Berry; Judy Toll
- Producers: Dawn DeKeyser; Mark Feuerstein; Lee Shallat-Chemel
- Camera setup: Multi-camera
- Running time: 30 minutes
- Production companies: Pennette Productions; 3 Sisters Entertainment; NBC Studios

Original release
- Network: NBC
- Release: September 21 – December 21, 1998

Conrad Bloom is an American television sitcom series created by Caroline in the City producer Marco Pennette, that aired on NBC from September 21, 1998, to December 21, 1998, and running for 15 episodes.

The series was cancelled after nine episodes for the low ratings; however, co-stars Mark Feuerstein and Linda Lavin would later reunite for the CBS series 9JKL, which debuted in 2017.

== Premise ==
The show is centered around Conrad Bloom, a copywriter in New York City, looking for love whilst trying to pursue his career. Conrad has to deal with the women in his life: A mother, a sister, an ex-girlfriend still harboring feelings for him, a boss and a co-worker. Conrad balances work, life, friends and family whilst trying to remember that love is out there.

== Cast ==
- Mark Feuerstein as Conrad Bloom
- Lauren Graham as Molly Davenport
- Jessica Stone as Shelly
- Paula Newsome as Faye Reynolds
- Steve Landesberg as George Dorsey
- Linda Lavin as Florie Bloom
- Ever Carradine as Nina Bloom.

== Episodes ==
All shoot dates were taken from various and scripts found whenever possible. Production codes were taken from the United States Copyright Office.

Most of the episodes were filmed from approximately July to December 1998.

No.	Title	Directed by	Written by	Original release date	Prod. code	Viewers (millions)
1	"Pilot"	James Burrows	Marco Pennette	September 21, 1998	101	9.57
Conrad keeps breaking dates with the woman he thinks might be his true love.
2	"The Fixer"	James Burrows	Heide Perlman	September 28, 1998	105	8.96
Shelly lies about getting Jerry Seinfeld for an ad campaign about potato chips. Nina thinks her mother loves Conrad more than her.
3	"The Ultimatum"	James Burrows	Dawn DeKeyser	October 5, 1998	102	9.34
Conrad and Molly's friendship is threatened by a jealous boyfriend. Conrad tries to get his sister and mother to live together.
4	"The Rebound Guy"	Ken Levine	Susan Sherman & Judy Toll	October 12, 1998	104	9.89
Conrad falls in love with a woman with great seats at Yankee Stadium. Florie meets an old enemy.: Shoot Date: August 18, 1998
5	"The Unsinkable Conrad Bloom"	Ken Levine	Eric Abrams & Matthew Berry	October 26, 1998	107	8.40
Conrad shows up at a Halloween party in a Titanic outfit.
6	"Gone with the Re-Wind"	Lee Shallat-Chemel	Paul A. Kaplan & Mark Torgove	November 9, 1998	108	7.51
Conrad accidentally tapes over a tape Shelly's child birth.
7	"The Spazz Singer"	Gail Mancuso	Dawn DeKeyser	November 16, 1998	109	7.27
A rock star has written a song about Conrad. Florie and Nina has a tennis match with Adele and her daughter.
8	"To Hell in a Handbag"	Ken Levine	Michael B. Kaplan	December 14, 1998	106	7.30
Conrad's mother asks him for help in selling a line of homemade purses. Molly tries to get a photography account with Conrad's ad firm.: Shoot Date: September 15, 1998
9	"A Bloom with a View"	Gail Mancuso	Marco Pennette	December 21, 1998	111	6.61
Conrad's mother and sister moves in with him in his new apartment.
10	"Working Girl"	James Burrows	Michael B. Kaplan	Unaired	103	N/A
Conrad's mother gets a new job.
11	"The Favor"	N/A	Story by : Eric Abrams & Matthew Berry; Teleplay by : Paul A. Kaplan & Mark Torgove	Unaired	110	N/A
Conrad's new neighbor asks him for a favor.
12	"Psycho Babbler Q'est Que Ce?"	Gail Mancuso	Heide Perlman	Unaired	112	N/A
Conrad's new girlfriend constantly analyzes their relationship.
13	"How Florie Got Her Groove Back"	Lee Shallat-Chemel	Michael B. Kaplan	Unaired	113	N/A
Florie starts dating a doctor.
14	"Dumb and Dummy-er"	Jeff Melman	Judy Toll & Susan Sherman	Unaired	114	N/A
Conrad dates a ventriloquist who creates a dummy based on Conrad. Florie is forced to become the super's servant.: Shoot Date: December 15, 1998
15	"How Good Relatives Go Bad"	Will Mackenzie	Heide Perlman	Unaired	115	N/A
Conrad, Nina and Florie go to the hospital to suck up for a dying aunt. Molly gets a job as a Monica Lewinsky lookalike.: Shoot Date: December 22, 1998
