= Jeffrey Anderson-Gunter =

Jamaican-born actor (born 1946)

- Born: September 17, 1946 (age 79); Jamaica
- Education: Boston University
- Occupation: Actor
- Years active: 1979–present

Jeffrey Anderson-Gunter (born 17 September 1946) is a Jamaican-born actor.

== Early life ==
He was born 17 September 1946 in Kingston, Jamaica, and moved to the US in 1968.

== Accomplishments ==
Anderson-Gunter is a Drama-Logue award-winning stage director. He also has been nominated at the Beverly Hills/Hollywood NAACP Awards for directing of his various projects. His accomplishments include all of the movies or plays he has been involved with, which includes Naked Gun 33 1/3: The Final Insult. The third instalment of the Naked Gun was nominated for a Golden Screen award in 1994, which it won. Along with the Golden Screen award two other actors in the film were nominated and won the Razzie awards, these were O. J. Simpson for Worst Supporting Actor and Anna Nicole Smith for Worst New Star.

Community involvement and accomplishments are something Anderson-Gunter relates with because he has been a part of big-name events other than his show biz career, such as charity events for the underprivileged of Jamaica. Specifically speaking Jeffrey participated in the Caribbean Classic Golf Invitational in 2006. The charity event included television personality Steve Harvey and others such as Anthony Anderson, Marcus Allen, Richard 'John Shaft' Roundtree, Boris Kodjoe, Sandra Denton of Salt N Pepa, and many more. All in all $200,000 was raised by the Caribbean Classic Golf Invitational, $80,000 was donated by the Steve Harvey Charity Foundation. Proceeds from the event were then used to establish technology centres in Jamaica. Also with the goal of the money the event was also used to promote Jamaica as a tourist destination for the world to enjoy and increase competitiveness within the Jamaican community to involve the island country in the global community. Anderson-Gunter has been involved with nearly every Caribbean Classic Golf Invitational charity event since its inception in 2005, the golf event still occurs every summer in Montego Bay, Jamaica. Anderson-Gunter is on the Jamaican team that is in a battle with 11 other Caribbean countries to raise the most money for Dell Computers. Cedric "The Entertainer" was a part of the event in 2009 and aided to the program by adding two days to feature comedy routines and a boxing tournament for added support for the funding of computers. The boxing tournament is known as the "Champions of Champions II" and features local talents from around the Caribbean. The winners of the Caribbean Classic Golf Invitational and the "Champions of Champions II" boxing tournament were presented awards for their honours; the Jamaican Celebrity Golf team that Jeffrey was a part of was able to raise the most money in 2009, which accounted for nearly $400,000.

== Broadway career and events ==
Jeffrey Gunter played roles not only on television shows, but on Broadway as well. He was able to host and perform many events, his first one being 13 February 2005. It was hosted in New York City at Town Hall and was a salute to the influence of Woody King Jr's New Federal Theatre (NFT) in the Black Arts Movement (BAM). Jeffrey Anderson-Gunter was a special guest performing at this event, along others such as Denzel Washington and Samuel L. Jackson. On 6 May 2012 the event Broadway Bound was again co hosted by Jeffrey Anderson-Gunter along with Obie award winner Charlayne Woodard. The event featured veteran actors, singers and dancers of Broadway. On 29 June 2013 the California African American Museum hosted 4 July festivities. Jeffrey was the co host of this event, alongside Nita Whitaker Lafontaine.

On 31 July 1979 Jeffrey played a few roles in his first broadway debut at 33 years of age. The Broadway production was titled But Never Jam Today. The musical was performed at the Longacre Theatre in New York City and was produced by Arch Nadler and Anita MacShane. It was choreographed by Talley Beatty and directed by Vinnette Carroll. This Broadway play had 8 performances and 6 previews. Jeffrey Anderson-Gunter had four roles in this performance. He played the roles of the Mushroom, the White Rabbit, the Mock Turtle, and the Cheshire Cat. He acted alongside other Broadway performers such as Brenda Braxton and Sharon K. Brooks. The play was a musical based on the previous musical Alice which premiered in May 1978 and included characters such as the Queen of Hearts, the Mad Hatter and Humpty Dumpty.

On 27 March 1980 Jeffrey Anderson-Gunter starred in the musical Reggae on Broadway. and moved to the US in 1968. This production was produced by Michael Butler, Eric Nezhad, and David Cogan. The numbers were choreographed by Mike Malone with Glenda Dickerson alongside directing. There were 21 performances of the musical and 11 previews. The setting of the musical was "One day in Jamaica" and the storyline was based on reggae music and Rastafari. It was based on a Jamaican pop singer that became successful in the USA before returning home and reuniting with an old lover who is in trouble with gangs and drug abuse. Jeffrey was part of the opening night cast as an ensemble that performed a musical number in a group with 16 others.

== Acting career ==
Jeffrey Anderson-Gunter has appeared in a wide variety of movies. These movies have consisted of anything from Malcolm in the Middle to the comedy Naked Gun that stars Leslie Nielsen.

He starred in Hudson Street, as Winston Silvira for 22 episodes in 1995–1996.

== Filmography ==
=== Film ===
Year	Title	Role	Notes
1980	Just Tell Me What You Want	Teddy	
1986	Off Beat	Dancing Cop	
1989	Pucker Up and Bark Like a Dog	Sebastian	(credited as Jeffrey Gunter)
1990	Marked for Death	'Nago'	
1991	Michael Jackson: Black or White	Jeffrey Anderson-Gunter	(Video short)
1992	Encino Man	Bartender	
1992	Maximum Force	Rastaman	(credited as Jeffrey Anderson Gunter)
1992	To Protect and Serve	'Teddy B.'	
1993	Maniac Cop III: Badge of Silence	Janitor	
1993	Only the Strong	Philippe	
1994	Naked Gun 33 1/3: The Final Insult	Cabbie	
1994	Zero Tolerance	LaFleur	
1995	The Chili Con Carne Club	Rasta Man	(Short)
1996	Don't Be a Menace to South Central While Drinking Your Juice in the Hood	Homeless Man	
1998	Hundred Percent	Rastafarian	
1998	The Souler Opposite	Evan	
2004	Apple Jacks Cereal	Cinnamon	
2004	The Wild Card	Bar Patron	(Video)
2007	Sublime	PJ	(Video)
2018	Revival	Herod	

=== Television ===
Year	Title	Role	Notes
1979	When Hell Freezes Over, I'll Skate		TV movie
1990	Hunter	Cab Driver	Episode: "This Is My Gun"
1991	The Flash	Nikolai Brown	Episode: "Captain Cold"
1991	Get a Life	Cook	Episode: "Health Inspector 2000"
1992	Hangin' with Mr. Cooper	Rastafarian	Episode: "Please Pass the Jock"
1994	Renegade	Moses	Episode: "Charlie"
1994	Unsolved Mysteries	Wadada	Episode #6.18
1995	In the House	Reggie	Episode: "Once Again, with Feeling"
1995-1996	Hudson Street	Winston Silvira	22 episodes
1996	Pacific Blue	Juju Man	Episode: "Daystalker"
1996	Cybill	Jose	Episode: "Bringing Home the Bacon"
1996	Nick Freno: Licensed Teacher	Desmond	Episode: "Teacher's Pest"
1997	Dangerous Minds	Jamaican baker	Episode: "To'e Me Up, To'e Me Down"
1997	The Burning Zone		Episode: "Death Song"
1997	Caroline in the City	Waiter	Episode: "Caroline and the Monkeys"
1997	NYPD Blue	Hilton	Episode: "Emission Impossible"
1997	Mike Hammer, Private Eye	Lionel	Episode: "A Penny Saved"
1997-1998	Union Square	Vince	14 episodes
1998	Babylon 5: Thirdspace	Merchant	TV movie
1998	Martial Law	Jamaican Musician	Episode: "How Sammo Got His Groove Back"
2001	The Bold and the Beautiful	Jamar / Jamas / Jamar, First Mate / ...	5 episodes
2001	Malcolm in the Middle	Concert Security Guy	Episode: "Vegas"
2013	Kroll Show	David R.	Episode: "San Diego Diet"
2016	Coconut Hut	Razor	
2016	American Dad!	Drake	Episode: "Bahama Mama"
2020	Arnold's Caribbean Pizza	Mr. Arnold	
