= Kristen Meadows =

American actress

- Born: Milwaukee, Wisconsin
- Occupation(s): TV, film, theatre actress
- Years active: 1979–2001

Kristen Meadows is a retired actress who has appeared in such daytime TV soap operas as One Life to Live as Mimi King and Santa Barbara as Victoria Lane.

== Personal life ==
Meadows was born in Milwaukee, Wisconsin. She comes from a family of performers and started her stage career in musicals. When she was 12, she has got a leading role in musical directed by her grandfather (a conductor). After graduating from high school, she studied at the American Academy of Dramatic Arts. Later she was a model for Wilhelmina Models Agency, did commercials, and became a TV and movie actress. In 1981, she made her Broadway debut in the play Fearless Frank.

Meadows was engaged with English designer Paul Stanley Lewis, but their wedding was canceled. On 16 July 1988, Meadows married a television director by the name of Bill Sheridan, but they were soon divorced. She had a romance with her Santa Barbara co-star Frank Runyeon, then started a relationship with Dr. David Kipper. Their son Sam was born in December 1989.

Meadows received death threats from fans over the way she played Victoria Lane, and she knew that she was not popular with Eden and Cruz fans, so Meadows left Santa Barbara in 1989.

== Filmography ==
- Zero Tolerance (1994) as agent Megan
- Evolution (2001) as Patty

== Television ==
TV acting roles
| Year | Film/Series | Character | Notes |
|---|---|---|---|
| 1979-82,1983,1985-86 | One Life to Live | as Mimi King | ABC-TV soap opera; 2 episodes |
| 1983 | Matt Houston | Erin | ABC-TV series; 1 episode |
| 1983 | Lottery! | ???? | in episode Winning Can Be Murder |
| 1983 | T. J. Hooker | Alice Danner | TV series; guest role, in episode "Matter Of Passion" |
| 1983-1985 | The A-Team | Toby Griffith /Jenny Sherman | guest starred in episodes "Diamonds n' Dust" & "Incident At Crystal Lake" |
| 1984 | The Fall Guy | Liz Martinson/ Stacy Baker | guest role in episodes "Losers Weepers" (Parts I & II)/ & "The Molly Sue" |
| 1984 | Hill Street Blues | Caroline Reynolds | NBC-TV series; in 3 episodes |
| 1984 | Riptide (American TV series) | Tina Brasil | in episode Conflict Of Interest |
| 1984 | Automan | Ellie Harmon | in episode The Biggest Game In Town |
| 1984 | Sins Of The Past | Diane | TV movie |
| 1984 | Glitter | Julie Tipton | TV series (1 episode) |
| 1985 | Simon & Simon | Sally Edwards | CBS-TV series; guest star in episodes "Simon Without Simon" (Parts I & II) |
| 1985 | Street Hawk | Diana Gassner | ABC-TV series; in episode "Fire On The Wing" |
| 1985 | The Wizard | ???? | in episode Haunting Memories |
| 1986 | Double Dare | Herself | TV game show appearance |
| 1986–1989 | Santa Barbara | Victoria “Tori“ Lane Capwell | NBC-TV soap series; main cast role, 303 episodes |
| 1988 | Sonny Spoon | Kelsey | in episode "Diamonds Aren't Forever" |
| 1990-1992 | Days of Our Lives | Elizebeth Lovett | January 1990 - February 1991; & April to October 1992 |
| 1991 | Paradise | | in episode "Bad Blood" |
| 1991 | MacGyver | Suzanne Walker | in episode Strictly Business |
| 1996 | Baywatch Nights | Jeri Ross | in episode "Thief In The Night" |
| 1996 | High Tide | Dr. Andrea Manning | in episode "Dr. Feelgood" |
| 1998 | Beyond Belief: Fact or Fiction | Tammy's mother | in episode "The Cure" |
| 2001 | The Bold and the Beautiful | Real estate agent | CBS-TV soap opera series |

== Theatre ==
- Hits Of Broadway
- South Pacific
- Pippin as Catherine
- The Rocky Horror Picture Show as Janet
- Kismet
- Hair
- Fiddler on the Roof
- The Sound of Music as Liesel
