= Watch What Happens Live with Andy Cohen =

American pop culture-based late-night talk show

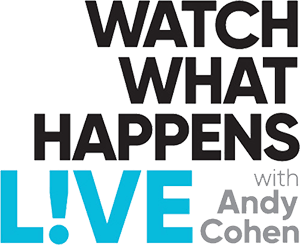
- Also known as: Watch What Happens Live (until December 19, 2016, from October 11, 2020); Watch What Happens Live With Andy Cohen @Home (March 30-October 10, 2020)
- Genre: Late-night talk show
- Presented by: Andy Cohen
- Country of origin: United States
- Original language: English
- No. of seasons: 22
- No. of episodes: 2,938

Production
- Executive producers: Michael Davies; Deirdre Connolly; Andy Cohen
- Camera setup: Multi-camera
- Running time: 22 minutes
- Production companies: Embassy Row; Sony Pictures Television

Original release
- Network: Bravo
- Release: July 16, 2009 – present

Watch What Happens Live! with Andy Cohen (abbreviated WWHL, previously named Watch What Happens Live!) is an American pop culture-based late-night talk show hosted by Andy Cohen on Bravo that premiered on July 16, 2009.

== Overview ==
The show features Bravo's own reality programming in the manner of an aftershow and popular culture news. The show's title was inspired by the network's then-slogan, "Watch what happens."

The show is produced live from New York City, allowing interaction with viewers by phone and social media.

In November 2013, Bravo renewed the show for two additional seasons.

On March 2, 2016, the show aired its 1,000th episode.

The show celebrated its ten-year milestone in June 2019 with Luann de Lesseps, John Mayer and Chrissy Teigen making appearances.

On March 13, 2020, the show suspended production due to the COVID-19 pandemic, during which Andy Cohen himself tested positive for the virus. The show had been produced from Cohen's apartment starting in March. The show returned to its Manhattan studio on October 11, 2020.

On January 19, 2022, Bravo renewed the show through 2023, which marked the show’s 15th year on air.

== See also ==
- List of programs broadcast by Bravo
- List of late-night American network TV programs
- List of television shows filmed in New York City
