= Union Square (TV series) =

- Genre: Sitcom
- Created by: Marco Pennette; Fred Barron
- Written by: Fred Barron; George McGrath
- Directed by: James Burrows; Brent Carpenter
- Starring: Constance Marie; Jeffrey Anderson-Gunter; Christine Marie Burke; Harriet Sansom Harris; Radmar Agana Jao; Michael Landes; Jim Pirri; Jonathan Slavin
- Composer: Bruce Miller
- Country of origin: United States
- Original language: English
- No. of seasons: 1
- No. of episodes: 14 (1 unaired)

Production
- Executive producers: Fred Barron; Marco Pennette; Michael B. Kaplan; Gary Murphy; Neil Thompson
- Producer: Tim Berry
- Cinematography: Richard Brown
- Editor: Brent Carpenter
- Camera setup: Multi-camera
- Running time: 30 minutes
- Production companies: Barron/Pennette Productions; Three Sisters Entertainment; NBC Studios

Original release
- Network: NBC
- Release: September 25, 1997 – January 22, 1998

Union Square is an American sitcom television series created by Marco Pennette and Fred Barron, that was broadcast on NBC for one season from September 25, 1997, to January 22, 1998. The show was supposed to serve as a vehicle for actress Mel Gorham, using her life as its basis, but was retooled into an ensemble sitcom without Gorham after the original pilot was poorly received.

== Overview ==
=== Original pilot ===
The pilot of Union Square follows Mel (Mel Gorham), a small time actress who decides to quit her job working at a Miami gift shop and become a Broadway star. Armed with her wits and her large dog named Bird, Mel heads for New York City to stay with her friend Lana. She is later shocked to find that Lana and her boyfriend, Micheal (Michael Landes) broke up, resulting in Lana moving out. Mel tries to reason with Michael to let her stay with him until she can get an apartment of her own. Despite consistently telling her no, she persists and follows him to the Union Square Diner. Michael used to be a lawyer but gave it up to focus on his passion of becoming a playwright, but writes instructional manuals to make money.

At the diner, she meets Carrie, a musician, who works at the diner as a waitress; Suzanne, a snarky real-estate agent; Albie, the other waiter at the diner who can be dim-witted, Jack Pappas, the hunky head chef of the diner who is known for his womanizing, and Vince, the owner of the diner. Mel goes on an audition for a Neil Simon play, but misplaces her lucky locket. She goes to the audition anyway with Michael finding it later on. However, Michael only dropped it off to her as a means of avoiding Lana, who was going to come by the diner to check on Mel. After not only failing to get the part but getting so nervous she throws up on Neil Simon, Mel reluctantly concedes she might have rushed her dreams a little. Michael cheers her up just as Lana comes to the diner. Lana reveals that Michael was not a passionate lover and didn't seem to care about their relationship. Mel helps Michael make Lana jealous and Michael agrees to let Mel stay with him, mostly out of fear for what she might have her dog do to him if he said anything to the contrary.

=== Changes from the original pilot ===
After poor test screenings and negative assessments from advertisers for the pilot, the producers retooled the show and replaced Gorham, who played a struggling actress named Mel Suarez, with Constance Marie as Gabriella. Once Gorham was replaced, the show was retooled into an ensemble cast format. The show instead centered on the goings on around the diner and some of the ways the group helped each other with their ambitions, goals or plans.

== Cast ==
=== Main ===
- Constance Marie as Gabriella Diaz
- Jeffrey Anderson-Gunter as Vince
- Christine Marie Burke as Carrie
- Harriet Sansom Harris as Suzanne Barkley
- Radmar Agana Jao as Kim
- Michael Landes as Michael Weiss
- Jim Pirri as Jack Pappas
- Jonathan Slavin as Albie
- Mel Gorham as Mel Suarez (pilot only)

== Episodes ==
No.	Title	Directed by	Written by	Original release date	Prod. code	Viewers (millions)
1	"Hasta La Muerta, Baby"	James Burrows	Marco Pennette & Fred Barron	September 25, 1997	001	25.55
2	"The Audition"	James Burrows	Gary Murphy & Neil Thompson	October 2, 1997	003	20.75
3	"Enjoy Your Haddock"	James Burrows	George McGrath	October 9, 1997	002	19.13
4	"A Stool with a View"	James Burrows	Eric Abrams & Matthew Berry	October 16, 1997	008	20.71
5	"Michael's First Stand"	Arlene Sanford	Michael B. Kaplan	October 30, 1997	005	19.29
6	"Harassed"	James Burrows	Gary Murphy & Neil Thompson	November 6, 1997	007	20.37
7	"Get Rusty"	Leonard R. Garner Jr.	Michael B. Kaplan	November 13, 1997	010	20.47
8	"Jack Gets a Hot Tip"	James Burrows	Donald Todd	December 4, 1997	006	14.61
9	"No Sex 'Til After Homework"	Lee Shallat Chemel	Donald Todd	December 11, 1997	011	19.99
10	"The First Christmas Show"	James Burrows	Teleplay: Nora Lynch & Phil Palisoul; Story: Eric Abrams & Matthew Berry	December 18, 1997	012	19.35
11	"What Are Friends For?"	Leonard R. Garner, Jr.	Colleen Taber	January 8, 1998	014	18.82
12	"Out and In"	James Burrows	Neil Thompson & Gary Murphy	January 15, 1998	013	20.69
13	"It Takes a Thief"	James Burrows	Michael B. Kaplan	January 22, 1998	009	18.95
14	"Smarty Pants"	Brent Carpenter	N/A	Unaired	004	N/A

== Production and broadcast ==
The program replaced Fired Up on NBC's "Must See TV" night of programming; it was given an 8:30 p.m. timeslot on Thursday evenings, a highly coveted spot due to its location between popular sitcoms Friends (which aired at 8:00 p.m.) and Seinfeld (which aired at 9:00 p.m.). Like The Single Guy, Union Square attempted to capitalize on attractive singles in their 20s and 30s enjoying New York City life, which both Seinfeld and Friends (as well as other NBC programs) had turned into successes. Despite the advantages of its timeslot, Union Square lost a large portion of its lead-in audience from Friends, and was cancelled in January 1998, after 14 episodes had been made.

The show featured guest appearances from actor David Krumholtz, who appeared in two episodes. Rhea Perlman also guest starred, as did Mario Lopez who appeared as a child that Suzanne sponsored.

== Reception ==
Union Square was ranked #8 in the ratings for the 1997–98 season, and was the second highest-rated new show of the season, with almost 20 million viewers, though it still lost a large portion of its lead-in audience from Friends.

The show was poorly received critically. Ray Richmond of Variety described the show as having "all the wit and charm of a pepper-spray canister", and concludes ""Union Square" is like "Friends" on decaf — grumpy, disconnected, tired. The snore you hear may be your own." Will Joyner of The New York Times states that ""Union Square"... has a disconcertingly familiar feel to it."
