= Music Video Comp Reel =

Music Video Comp Reel is a public access cable TV series based in Los Angeles that features music videos, behind the scenes and interviews for popular hip-hop, rock, and pop music artists. The first edition of Music Video Comp Reel aired in Los Angeles on July 18, 2005 at 3:00pm on Adelphia (now Spectrum) featuring the band U2. This showing highlighted videos of their album How To Dismantle An Atomic Bomb which included "Vertigo" and "Sometimes You Can't Make It on Your Own".

== Moving Forward ==
Music Video Comp Reel would later move to KSCI on June 1, 2007. Show summary for publication from the network was: Music videos are spotlighted in this series. (Music Videos). Weekly episodes aired during the summer of 2007. Music Video Comp Reel was the only local music video show airing on Free TV in two of the top seven markets in the United States. Alli Bivins opened and closed the shows airing during this period. The show filled a void for music video lovers who did not have cable or internet. Word of mouth quickly spread resulting in fan mail from as far away as India. Genres played: alternative metal, funk, hip-hop, house, indie rock, pop, rhythm and blues, rock, and soul.

Although the shows public following was larger than ever the executive producer moved onto another project at the end of the 2007 summer season. The last episode to air was on August 3, 2007.

== Additional music videos ==
- Yung Berg featuring Junior "Sexy Lady"
- Three 6 Mafia featuring Chamillionaire "Doe Boy Fresh" Sony BMG
- Amerie "Take Control" Sony BMG
- Omarion "Icebox" Sony BMG
- Seventh Day Slumber "Awake" Tooth & Nail Records
- Eric Prydz VS Floyd "Proper Education" Ministry Of Sound
- Between The Trees "The Way She Feels”
- Consequence "Don’t Forget 'Em" Columbia Records
- Kidz in the Hall "Wheelz Fall Off ('06 'Til...)" Rawkus Records
- El-P featuring Trent Reznor "Flyentology" Definitive Jux
- John Legend "P.D.A. (We Just Don't Care)" Columbia Records
- Marques Houston "Circle" Universal Motown
- Romeo "Special Girl" Symbolic Entertainment
- Mindless Self Indulgence "Straight to Video" Metropolis Records
- The Graduate "Sit & Sink"
- El-P "Smithereens" Definitive Jux
- Frankie J "Daddy’s Little Girl" Sony BMG
- No More Kings "Sweep the Leg" Astonish Records

== See also ==
- List of television shows set in Los Angeles
