= Zero Tolerance (1994 film) =

- Directed by: Joseph Merhi
- Written by: Jacobsen Hart
- Produced by: Joseph Merhi; Richard Pepin
- Starring: Robert Patrick; Titus Welliver; Mick Fleetwood
- Cinematography: Ken Blakey
- Edited by: Chris Maybach; Chris Worland
- Music by: John Gonzales
- Distributed by: PM Entertainment Group Inc.
- Release date: November 21, 1994
- Running time: 1 hour 34 minutes.
- Country: United States
- Language: English

Zero Tolerance is a 1994 American action film from PM Entertainment Group directed by Joseph Merhi and starring Robert Patrick and Mick Fleetwood.

== Plot ==
After surviving a sneak attack on himself and fellow feds Jimmy (William Steis) and Gene (Michael Gregory) as they transport Mafia boss Raymond Manta (Titus Welliver) out of a Mexican jail, FBI agent Jeff Douglas (Robert Patrick) becomes an unwitting pawn of the White Hand drug cartel.

The White Hand lies to Jeff and says that his family is being held hostage and he has to help them smuggle a huge drug shipment to get them released unharmed, Jeff is forced to turn one-time courier for the White Hand, whose leaders are Manta and four others—Helmut Vitch (Mick Fleetwood), Milt Kowalski (Miles O'Keeffe), Russ LaFleur (Jeffrey Anderson-Gunter), and Hansel Lee (Gustav Vintas). In truth, the cartel had already murdered his wife and two young children, and planned to kill Jeff after he succeeded in delivering their drugs.

The drugs are delivered and the White Hand sets Jeff up to be killed in a car bombing in Las Vegas, but Jeff's instincts kick in and he is only slightly injured in the blast, and the cartel thinks he is dead and gone. Jeff learns that his family was killed, and he breaks down in tears. A short time later, the FBI wants to get him back to work, but Jeff has begun planning to wipe out the White Hand cartel.

Officially censured but unofficially aided by concerned agent Megan (Kristen Meadows), whose mother was raped and murdered years ago, Jeff steals some FBI files and kicks off his cartel extermination campaign by killing Vitch in Las Vegas, at Vitch's casino.

In New Orleans, Jeff sabotages LaFleur's liquid-heroin deal with a factory fire, and then at LaFleur's night club, Jeff finishes him off in full view of a satellite hook-up watched by Manta and Kowalski at their hide-out. Kowalski does not enjoy killing and is angry that Manta's brutal murder plan is disrupting their business, which begins to anger Manta in turn.

After that, Jeff kills Lee in his heavily guarded mansion in Seattle. After Megan arrives to speed up Jeff's getaway, the couple is apprehended by local cops, and then ambushed by Manta's men.

Although Megan is captured and taken away in a helicopter, Jeff momentarily flees. Angered by Kowalski's accurate descriptions of him as a sadistic creep, Manta shoots and kills Kowalski at his complex, but endures a savage beating from Jeff who is able to rescue Megan.

Under arrest at FBI headquarters, Manta says it's not over by a long shot. Manta grabs a gun, and in an effort to disarm Manta, Jeff plows into Manta and sends him through a window. As a result, Manta takes a fall to his death, which completes Jeff's mission to wipe out the White Hand cartel.

== Cast (selection) ==
- Robert Patrick - Jeff Douglas
- Kristen Meadows - Megan
- Titus Welliver - Raymond Manta
- Mick Fleetwood - Helmut Vitch
- Miles O'Keeffe - Milt Kowalski
- Jeffrey Anderson-Gunter as Russ LaFleur
- Gustav Vintas as Hansel Lee

== Home video ==
The film was released on home video in the UK by First Independent Films, and on the Dutch Filmworks label in the Netherlands.
