= Marco Pennette =

American TV producer

- Born: July 9, 1966 (age 60); Greenwich, Connecticut, U.S.
- Education: New York University
- Occupations: Television writer; producer
- Partner: Steve Rabiner
- Children: 3

Marco Pennette (born July 9, 1966) is an American television writer and producer.

== Early life ==
Pennette was born in Greenwich, Connecticut where he grew up loving theatre: "I want to go into theatre; TV sort of lured me away." He attended New York University where he studied at the Tisch School of the Arts and as a student was a finalist in the Young Playwrights Festival. He intended to pursue a career in Broadway theatre but sold his first television script to Kate & Allie and dropped out of university and moved to Los Angeles to pursue television writing.

== Career ==
Pennette's career began on the sitcom Kate & Allie from where he moved on to other projects including Dave's World and Dear John. He went on to create and write for many of his own series: Caroline in the City, Union Square, Conrad Bloom and All About the Andersons. By 1995, he started Barron/Pennette Productions with friend Fred Barron. Most notably, though, were the short-lived medical drama Inconceivable co-created with Oliver Goldstick, inspired by both of their surrogate pregnancy experiences, and the short-lived midseason sitcom Crumbs, an autobiographical portrayal of his family experiences and closeted young adulthood. His other writing and producing work from 2003 onwards includes serving as executive producer and co-executive producer on the television series I'm with Her and the sitcom What I Like About You, for both of which he also wrote a number of episodes. He also wrote the script for and was the executive producer of the 2007 Football Wives pilot, which was originally intended to be a television series but was later declined by the American Broadcasting Company in favour of seven other pilots with lower budgets, as the ABC claimed that the pitched budget for Football Wives was too high for a midseason pick-up. The series was set to be a U.S. version of the popular British soap opera Footballers' Wives.

He was a member of the writing panel and an executive producer/co-showrunner on the dramedy series Ugly Betty, initially having been a co-executive producer. Ugly Betty's creator and other showrunner Silvio Horta was named AfterElton.com's Man of the Year for 2007 for the show's positive portrayal of LGBT issues—including a possibly gay teenager, a transgender woman and a gay male assistant with a homophobic mother—and had to say about Pennette, also gay: "Marco Pennette, my co-showrunner and Executive Producer, deserves a special thanks here too. He is an MVP of comedy, and a big part of Ugly Betty's gay sensibility." On February 11, 2008, ABC picked up Ugly Betty for the 2008-09 television season, but on the day the renewal was announced, Pennette, along with fellow executive producer James Hayman, were let go. The departures of Pennette and Hayman added to the constant turnover on the series off-camera, which has so far seen five writers having exited or been fired.

In August 2012, Pennette became showrunner of Animal Practice, replacing Gail Lerner after the third episode had been shot.

In September 2026, news of Pennette co-producing a new show staring David Hyde Pierce was made public. Pennette will pen the pilot episode to air on NBC.

== Personal life ==
Openly gay, Pennette was outed by a network executive on the People's Choice Awards red carpet when asked about his boyfriend in front of his family members, who were unaware of his sexuality. His long-time partner is television talent manager Steve Rabiner, with whom he has three daughters, Ally, Chelsea, and Zoe, all born by surrogate pregnancy, the inspiration for his medical drama Inconceivable. His own family experiences were the basis for his sitcom Crumbs; his brother's drowning, his mother's institutionalization and his father's impregnation of another woman.

He is a good friend of Broadway theatre spokesman Seth Rudetsky, having hired him previously to write a song for a character in his sitcom Caroline in the City—an IRS employee auditioning for the musical Cats.

Pennette was suffering from renal failure and required a kidney transplant in 2013. The story of his survival became the basis for the 2020 CBS sitcom B Positive, for which Pennette is creator and co-executive producer.

== Filmography ==
- The Golden Palace, TV Series (1992–1993)
- Dave's World, TV Series (1993–1995)
- Caroline in the City, TV Series (1995–1999)
- Union Square, TV Series (1997)
- Conrad Bloom, TV Series (1998)
- Live Girls, TV Series (2000)
- The Hughleys, TV Series (2001–2002)
- Regular Joe, TV Series (2003)
- All About the Andersons, TV Series (2003)
- I'm with Her, TV Series (2003–2004)
- What I Like About You, TV Series (2004–2005)
- Inconceivable, TV Series (2005)
- Ugly Betty, TV Series (2006–2008)
- Crumbs, TV Series (2006)
- Football Wives, TV Movie (2007)
- Samantha Who?, TV Series (2008–2009)
- This Little Piggy, TV Movie (2009)
- Desperate Housewives, TV Series (2009–2012)
- The Manzanis, TV Movie (2012)
- Animal Practice, TV Series (2012–2013)
- Kirstie, TV Series (2013–2014)
- Mom, TV Series (2013–2020)
- B Positive, TV Series (2020–2021)

== Theatre and musical ==
- Death Becomes Her (2024)
