= List of television shows set in Los Angeles =

This is a list of television shows set or filmed in the Greater Los Angeles Area (including Los Angeles and Orange County communities such as Beverly Hills, Santa Monica, Malibu, and Newport Beach).

== 0–100 ==
- 2 Stupid Dogs
- 3-South
- 3Below: Tales of Arcadia
- 3rd & Bird
- 12 oz. Mouse
- 10 Things I Hate About You
- The 13 Ghosts of Scooby-Doo
- 100 Deeds for Eddie McDowd
- 24
- The 45 Rules of Divorce
- 1000 Ways to Die
- 77 Sunset Strip
- 90210 (Beverly Hills)
- 9-1-1

== A ==
- The A-Team
- A Pup Named Scooby-Doo
- Æon Flux
- Action League Now!
- Adam-12
- Adventures from the Book of Virtues (Seasons 1&2)
- The Adventures of Batman
- The Adventures of Gulliver
- The Adventures of Puss in Boots
- The Adventures of Raggedy Ann and Andy (Los Angeles)
- a.k.a. Pablo
- ALF
- ALF Tales
- Alias
- Alien Nation
- All About the Andersons
- All Grown Up!
- All Hail King Julien
- All My Children (starting in 2010)
- All of Us
- Almost Perfect
- The Alvin Show
- American Horror Story (seasons 1, 2 and 5)
- American Idol (Hollywood)
- America's Next Top Model cycle 4-9, 11 and 13
- Amphibia
- Angel
- Animaniacs
- The Ant and the Aardvark
- The Apprentice (season 6)
- Aquarius
- Arabian Knights
- The Archie Show
- Are You Smarter Than a 5th Grader?
- Arrested Development (Orange County)
- Around the World in 79 Days
- Attack of the Show!
- Atom Ant
- Auction Hunters
- Awake
- Awkward (Palos Verdes)
- Avengers Assemble

== B ==
- Bad Girls All-Star Battle
- The Bad Girls Club, seasons 1-4, 6, 13 and 14
- Baldwin Hills
- The Banana Splits Adventure Hour
- Barbie Dreamtopia
- Barnaby Jones
- Barry
- Basketball Wives LA
- Batgirl Year One Motion Comic
- The Batman/Superman Hour
- Batman Unlimited
- Baywatch
- Ben and Kate
- Ben Casey
- Betsy's Kindergarten Adventures
- Better Off Ted
- Better Things
- The Beverly Hillbillies
- Beverly Hills, 90210
- Beverly Hills Teens
- Bewitched (Burbank)
- The Big Bang Theory (Pasadena)
- Big City Greens
- Big Nate
- Big Time Rush
- Biker Mice from Mars
- Blackstar
- Black-ish
- Blaze and the Monster Machines
- Blossom
- The Bob Cummings Show (Hollywood)
- Bobby's World
- BoJack Horseman
- The Bold and the Beautiful
- Bonkers
- Bolice 4
- Bookie
- Boomtown
- Bosch
- The Boys Presents: Diabolical
- The Brady Bunch
- Bracken's World
- Brimstone
- Brothers and Sisters
- The Brothers Sun
- Buddy Thunderstruck
- The Bugs Bunny Show
- Bump in the Night
- Burke's Law (1963)
- Burke's Law (1994)
- Buzz Lightyear of Star Command
- The Buzz On Maggie

== C ==
- California Dreams (Redondo Beach)
- California Fever
- Californication
- The California Raisin Show
- Calvin and the Colonel
- Camp Candy
- Camp Wilder
- Captain N: The Game Master
- Cannon
- Care Bears: Unlock the Magic
- Carmen Sandiego
- The Casagrandes
- Casual
- Cattanooga Cats
- The Catch
- Celebrity Deathmatch (2006)
- ChalkZone
- Charlie's Angels
- The Charlie Brown and Snoopy Show
- The Charmings
- Cheat!
- Chico and the Man
- Chip 'n Dale Rescue Rangers
- CHiPs
- Chuck (Burbank, California)
- City of Angels (1976)
- City of Angels (2000)
- Clash-A-Rama
- Clean House
- Clifford the Big Red Dog
- Clifford's Puppy Days (Los Angeles)
- Clone High
- Close Enough
- The Closer
- Clueless
- Cut (Glendale, California)
- Clyde Crashcup
- Code R (Channel Islands)
- Code Red
- The Colbys
- Columbo
- The Comeback (Beverly Hills)
- The Completely Mental Misadventures of Ed Grimley
- The Contender (Season 2)
- Crash
- Crashbox
- Crazy Ex-Girlfriend (West Covina)
- Crusader Rabbit
- The Cuphead Show!
- Curb Your Enthusiasm
- Curious George
- Cybill

== D ==
- Dan Vs. (Van Nuys)
- Dancing With the Stars
- Danger Rangers
- Dark Blue
- Dastardly and Muttley in Their Flying Machines
- Day Break
- Deal or No Deal (Culver City)
- Death Valley (TV series)
- Dear Phoebe
- The Deep End (TV series)
- Denver, the Last Dinosaur
- Desire
- Devlin
- Diagnosis: Murder
- The Dick Tracy Show
- Dink, the Little Dinosaur
- Dino-Riders
- Dirt
- Drawn Together
- Drop Dead Diva
- Dr. Phil
- DreamWorks Dragons
- Doc McStuffins
- Dog With a Blog (Pasadena)
- Dollhouse
- Doogie Howser, M.D.
- Dorothy and the Wizard of Oz
- Dragnet
- Duckman
- DuckTales
- DuckTales (2017)
- Dude, That's My Ghost! (Hollywood)
- The Dudley Do-Right Show

== E ==
- E! News
- East Los High
- Eastsiders
- El Talismán
- El Tigre: The Adventures of Manny Rivera
- Ellen
- Emergency!
- The Emperor's New School
- The Epic Tales of Captain Underpants
- Entourage
- Episodes
- Eva Luna
- Even Stevens

== F ==
- The Fall Guy
- Family
- Family Guy
- Family Feud
- Famous in Love
- Fantastic Voyage
- Fantastic Max
- The Fairly OddParents
- The Fairly OddParents: Fairly Odder
- Fashion House
- Fast & Furious: Spy Racers
- Fast Times
- Fastlane
- Fat Actress
- Fear the Walking Dead
- Fetch! With Ruff Ruffman
- Flaked (Venice)
- FlashForward
- The Flight Attendant (Season 2)
- The Fluffer
- The Flintstones
- The Flintstone Comedy Show
- Franklin and Bash
- The Fresh Prince of Bel-Air
- The Further Adventures of SuperTed
- The Fonz and the Happy Days Gang

== G ==
- G.I. Joe: A Real American Hero
- G.I. Joe: Renegades
- Gang Related
- Garbage Pail Kids
- Garfield and Friends
- The Garfield Show
- Gary & Mike
- General Hospital
- Gentefied
- George Lopez
- Gidget (Santa Monica)
- Gimme a Break! (fictional town of Glenlawn)
- Girlfriends
- Girlfriends' Guide to Divorce
- The Girls Next Door
- Goldie Gold and Action Jack
- Going Places
- Gormiti
- Graceland
- Grady
- The Greatest American Hero
- Green Eggs and Ham
- Grown-ish

== H ==
- The Handler
- Hanna–Barbera's World of Super Adventure
- Hannah Montana (Malibu)
- Happily Divorced
- Hardcastle and McCormick
- The Hardy Boys
- Harukana Receive (Manhattan Beach)
- HeartBeat (1988 TV series)
- Heartbeat (2016 TV series)
- Heathcliff
- Hell Date
- Hello Ladies
- Henry Hugglemonster
- Here Comes The Grump
- Heroes (season 1 scenes involving Greg Grunberg's character, Matt Parkman; regular in season 2)
- The Heirs (San Diego, Redlands, Huntington Beach, Malibu and Kim Tan's Mansion)
- Hi Hi Puffy AmiYumi
- Hidden Hills
- The Hills
- HobbyKids Adventures
- Home Movies
- Hong Kong Phooey
- Hoodwinked!
- Hollywood 7
- Home: Adventures with Tip & Oh
- House of Lies
- Hot Wheels
- Hulk and the Agents of S.M.A.S.H.
- Hunter

== I ==
- I Dream of Jeannie (Burbank)
- The Idhun Chronicles (English dub)
- If You Give a Mouse a Cookie
- I'm in the Band
- I'm Dying Up Here
- I'm Sorry
- Insecure
- I Love LA
- The Inspector
- In the House
- The Inside
- It's Garry Shandling's Show (Sherman Oaks)
- It's a Living
- It's the Wolf!

== J ==
- Jackass
- Jake and the Never Land Pirates
- Jakers! The Adventures of Piggley Winks
- James Bond Jr.
- The Jamie Foxx Show
- Jarian Mitchell
- Jay Jay the Jet Plane
- Jeopardy! (Culver City)
- The Jerry Springer Show
- Joey
- Jonas
- Jane the Virgin (Manhattan Beach, California)
- Judge Judy (Hollywood)
- Julie and the Phantoms
- Just Jordan (Hollywood)
- Just Legal (Santa Monica)
- Justice

== K ==
- KaBlam!
- Kaijudo
- Kamen Rider: Dragon Knight
- The Karate Kid
- Keeping Up with the Kardashians
- Kentucky Jones (set in an unidentified location in Southern California)
- Kiba Oh Klashers
- Kid Cosmic
- The Kid Super Power Hour with Shazam!
- Kingdom
- Kipo and the Age of Wonderbeasts
- Knots Landing (set in a fictitious town of the same name in Los Angeles County)
- Kung Fu Panda: The Dragon Knight
- The Kwicky Koala Show

== L ==
- The L Word
- L.A. 7
- L.A. Complex
- L.A. Dragnet
- L.A. Law
- Laguna Beach: The Real Orange County
- The Land Before Time
- The Larry Sanders Show
- Laverne & Shirley (Burbank, from the 6th season)
- Laverne & Shirley in the Army
- Law & Order: LA
- La bella y las bestias
- La Piloto 2: De Regreso Al Cielo
- Leaving L.A.
- The Legend of Prince Valiant
- The Legend of Vox Machina
- Legion of Superheroes
- Lego City
- LEGO City Adventures
- LEGO Monkie Kid
- Lethal Weapon
- Leverage
- Life
- Life in Pieces
- Life with Elizabeth
- The Lion Guard
- Lincoln Heights
- The Lincoln Lawyer
- Lizzie McGuire
- Lost
- Lou Grant
- Love
- Love & Hip Hop: Hollywood
- Love and Marriage
- Love Games: Bad Girls Need Love Too
- Lucifer
- The Lucy-Desi Comedy Hour
- The Lying Game

== M ==
- MacGyver
- MadTV
- Madagascar: A Little Wild
- Malcolm in the Middle
- Malibu Country
- Mao Mao: Heroes of Pure Heart
- Mann & Machine
- Mannix
- Marcus Welby, M.D. (Santa Monica)
- Maron
- Marvel Action Universe
- Mathnet
- McGee and Me!
- Mecard
- Medical Center
- Melrose Place
- Melrose Place (2009 TV series)
- Men of a Certain Age
- Micro Ventures
- Miles from Tomorrowland
- The Minor Accomplishments of Jackie Woodman
- Minx
- Miss Match
- Mr. Adams and Eve (Beverly Hills)
- Mr. Box Office
- The Mr. Men Show (US Dub)
- The Mr. Peabody & Sherman Show
- Mister Ed
- Mixels
- The Mod Squad
- Models Inc.
- Modern Family
- Moesha (Leimert Park)
- Mongo Wrestling Alliance
- The Monkees
- Monsters vs. Aliens
- Moonlight
- Moonlighting
- Motormouse and Autocat
- ¡Mucha Lucha!
- Muppet Babies (2018)
- Murder One
- Music Video Comp Reel

== N ==
- The Naked Truth (TV series)
- Nathan For You
- Nature Cat (Combined with Muppet Performers)
- NCIS: Los Angeles
- The New Adam-12
- The New Adventures of Beany and Cecil
- The New Adventures of Gilligan
- The New Adventures of Huckleberry Finn
- The New Adventures of Old Christine
- The New Adventures of the Lone Ranger
- The New Adventures of Winnie the Pooh
- The New Adventures of Zorro
- New Attitude
- The New Dragnet
- The New Gidget (Santa Monica)
- New Girl
- The New Normal
- The New Phil Silvers Show
- The New Yogi Bear Show
- Newport Harbor
- Newton's Cradle (Long Beach)
- NFL Rush Zone: Guardians of the Core
- No Ordinary Family
- Notes from the Underbelly
- Now Apocalypse
- Numbers
- Noah's Arc (TV series)

== O ==
- The O.C.
- Odd Squad (New York)
- Oh Yeah! Cartoons
- On the Lot
- One Day at a Time (2017 TV series)
- One on One (season 5)
- Operation Repo
- Out All Night
- Out of the Inkwell
- On My Block
- The Owl House

== P ==
- Pacific Blue (Santa Monica)
- Pacific Palisades
- The Parkers (Santa Monica)
- Partridge Family 2200 A.D.
- Party Down
- Pasadena (Pasadena)
- Peanuts (Boomerang, Cartoon Network)
- The Perils of Penelope Pitstop
- Perry Mason (CBS, 1957)
- Perry Mason (HBO, 2020)
- Pet Alien
- Pet Shop of Horrors (Chinatown)
- Pinkfong Wonderstar
- Pink Panther and Pals
- The Pink Panther Show
- Police Academy
- Police Woman
- Pound Puppies (1986 TV series)
- Pound Puppies (2010 TV series)
- Popular
- Poppy Cat (US Dub)
- Postcards from Buster (season 1) (PBS Kids GO) (East Los Angeles) (Los Angeles)
- Power Rangers (seasons 1-10)
- The Price Is Right (Hollywood)
- The Proud Family
- The Proud Family: Louder and Prouder
- Private Practice
- The Protector
- Puppy Dog Pals

== Q ==
- Quincy, M.E.

== R ==
- Rabbids Invasion
- Random! Cartoons
- Randy Cunningham: 9th Grade Ninja
- Rafferty
- Rainbow Brite (2014)
- Raines
- Raising Hope
- Rake
- Raw Toonage
- Ray Donovan
- The Real L Word
- The Real World: Hollywood
- The Real World: Los Angeles
- The Real Housewives of Beverly Hills
- The Real Housewives of Orange County
- Remington Steele
- Regular Show
- Rick & Steve
- Richie Rich
- The Richie Rich/Scooby-Doo Show
- Ridley Jones
- Ring Raiders
- Riptide
- Roary the Racing Car (US Dub)
- Robotech II: The Sentinels
- Rob & Big
- RoboCop
- Robot Chicken
- The Rockford Files
- The Rookie
- The Rookies
- Room 222
- The Ropers
- Rude Dog and the Dweebs
- The Ruff Ruffman Show
- The Ruff and Reddy Show
- Rugrats
- Runaways
- Rush
- Rush Hour
- RuPaul's Drag Race

== S ==
- Sabrina, The Teenage Witch
- Sam & Cat (Venice)
- The San Pedro Beach Bums (San Pedro)
- Sanford
- Sanford and Son (Watts)
- Sanford Arms
- Saved by the Bell (fictional town of Palisades)
- Saved by the Bell: The New Class (fictional town of Palisades)
- Saved by the Bell (2020 series, fictional town of Palisades)
- SciGirls
- Scooby-Doo, Where Are You!
- Scooby-Doo and Scrappy-Doo
- Scorpion
- Secret Millionaires Club
- The Secret Life of the American Teenager
- Selling Sunset
- Sesame Street (Animated Segments only)
- Sex, Love & Secrets (Silver Lake)
- Shaggy & Scooby-Doo Get a Clue!
- Shark
- Shark Tank
- Shazam!
- She-Hulk: Attorney at Law
- Skyhawks
- Skylanders Academy
- The Shield
- Six Feet Under
- Sleeper Cell
- Sliders (although the show was initially set in San Francisco, most episodes from seasons 3-5 took place in Los Angeles)
- The Smurfs
- Snagglepuss
- Snowfall
- So Little Time (Malibu)
- Sofia the First
- Son of the Beach (fictional city of Malibu Adjacent)
- Sonic Boom (Los Angeles)
- Sonny with a Chance
- South Central
- South of Nowhere
- Southland
- Space Stars
- Sparks (Compton)
- Special Agent Oso
- Speed Buggy
- The Spectacular Spider-Man (New York)
- Spider-Man
- Spider-Man and His Amazing Friends
- Sport Billy
- Star vs. the Forces of Evil (fictional town of Echo Creek)
- Star Trek: The Animated Series
- Starsky and Hutch
- The Starter Wife
- Steven Universe
- StoryBots: Answer Time
- Studio 60 on the Sunset Strip
- Super Friends
- Stripperella
- Summerland
- Star Street: The Adventures of the Star Kids
- The Super Hero Squad Show
- Superman
- S.W.A.T. (1975)
- S.W.A.T. (2017)
- SWAT Kats: The Radical Squadron
- Sweet Valley High (fictional suburb of Sweet Valley)
- Switch

== T ==
- T.J. Hooker (this story was about the fictitious "LCPD", but it was filmed in Los Angeles)
- T.O.T.S. (Burbank)
- The Tab Hunter Show (Malibu)
- Tabitha
- The Tarzan/Lone Ranger Adventure Hour
- Teenage Mutant Ninja Turtles (1987) (Seasons 5–8, 10) (Los Angeles)
- Teen Force
- Teen Titans
- Tenafly
- Tenspeed and Brown Shoe
- Terminator: The Sarah Connor Chronicles
- That's So Raven
- Them
- These Are the Days
- This Is America, Charlie Brown
- Three's Company (Santa Monica)
- The Tim Conway Show
- The Weird Al Show
- Tiny Toon Adventures
- Thundarr the Barbarian
- Todd McFarlane's Spawn (Los Angeles)
- Togetherness
- The Tonight Show (Burbank, 1972 until 2014)
- Too Old to Die Young
- Tom and Jerry
- Tom and Jerry Tales (American guest stars only)
- The Tom and Jerry Show (1975 and 2014)
- The Tom and Jerry Comedy Show
- Top Cat
- Top Chef (Season 2)
- Top Design
- Torchwood: Miracle Day
- Totally Spies! (fictional town of World Organization Of Human Protection (WOOHP)), (Beverly Hills in seasons 1-6, fictional Malibu University since season 5)
- Prime
- Transformers: Rescue Bots
- Robots in Disguise
- Combiner Wars
- Transparent
- Trollkins
- Trolls: The Beat Goes On!
- Trolls: TrollsTopia
- Two and a Half Men (Malibu)

== U ==
- The U.S. of Archie
- The Underseas Explorers
- Unikitty
- Up All Night
- UEFA Champions League

== V ==
- V (Two miniseries and then TV series)
- Valley of the Dinosaurs
- Vanderpump Rules
- VeggieTales
- VeggieTales in the City
- VeggieTales in the House
- The VeggieTales Show
- Victorious (fictional school of Hollywood Arts, Los Angeles)
- Viva Valdez
- The Voice
- Voltron
- Voltron: The Third Dimension
- Voltron: Legendary Defender
- Vytor: The Starfire Champion

== W ==
- Wacky Races
- Wake, Rattle, and Roll
- Watchmen
- Watching Ellie
- We Bare Bears
- We Baby Bears
- Weeds (fictional town of Agrestic)
- WordGirl
- Wolfboy and the Everything Factory
- World of Winx (English dub)
- Wow! Wow! Wubbzy!
- What About Brian
- What's Happening!! (Watts)
- What's Happening Now!!
- What If...?
- Wheel of Fortune (Culver City)
- Wheelie and the Chopper Bunch
- Where's Waldo?
- Where My Dogs At?
- The White Shadow
- Who Wants to Be a Millionaire?
- Widget
- Wild Grinders
- Wilfred (Venice)
- Winning Time: The Rise of the Lakers Dynasty

== X ==
- X-Play

== Y ==
- Yakky Doodle
- Yes, Dear
- The Yogi Bear Show
- Yogi's Gang
- The Young and the Restless
- You're the Worst
- You (Season 2)

== Z ==
- Zazoo U
- Zoey 101
- Zevo-3
- Zorro (1957)
- Zorro: La Espada y la Rosa
- The Zula Patrol

== See also ==
- List of movies set in Los Angeles
- Lists of television shows by city setting
