= All About the Andersons =

American TV sitcom (2003–04)

- Genre: Sitcom
- Created by: Marco Pennette; Adam Glass; Anthony Anderson
- Starring: Anthony Anderson; John Amos; Roz Ryan; Aimee Garcia; Damani Roberts
- Composers: Stephen Cullo; Gary Brown
- Country of origin: United States
- Original language: English
- No. of seasons: 1
- No. of episodes: 16

Production
- Executive producers: Marco Pennette; Adam Glass; James Widdoes
- Producers: Faye Oshima Belyeu; Anthony Anderson
- Camera setup: Multi-camera
- Running time: 30 minutes
- Production company: Warner Bros. Television

Original release
- Network: The WB
- Release: September 12, 2003 – February 12, 2004

All About the Andersons is an American sitcom television series that originally aired on The WB from September 12, 2003, to February 12, 2004. It was canceled after one season.

== Premise ==
Anthony Anderson is a single father and struggling actor who moves back into his parents' house only to find that his room has been rented out to a medical school student. Upon return, he realizes why he moved out in the first place.

== Cast ==
- Anthony Anderson as Anthony Anderson
- John Amos as Joseph "Joe" Anderson
- Roz Ryan as Florence "Flo" Anderson
- Aimee Garcia as Lydia Serrano
- Damani Roberts as Tuga Anderson

== Episodes ==
No.	Title	Directed by	Written by	Original release date	Prod. code	Viewers (millions)
1	"Pilot"	James Widdoes	Anthony Anderson, Adam Glass and Marco Pennette	September 12, 2003	475353	3.16
Anthony and his son moves in with Anthony's parents to create a stable environment.
2	"Don't Be a Dater Hater"	James Widdoes	Marco Pennette	September 19, 2003	176851	3.18
Anthony asks his parents for advice when he is about to go out on his first date in 10 years.
3	"Go with the Flo"	James Widdoes	Christopher Vane	September 26, 2003	176852	2.90
The men of the house are left to fend for themselves after Flo becomes more independent.
4	"It's My Son, I Can Raise Him If I Want To"	James Widdoes	Devon Shepard	October 3, 2003	176853	2.69
Anthony's parenting style is criticized by Joe and Flo.
5	"The Golden Child"	Joe Regalbuto	Adam Glass	October 10, 2003	176854	2.77
Lydia takes the blame when Anthony wrecks the Car.
6	"My Hero"	Joe Regalbuto	Tommy Carey	October 17, 2003	176855	2.27
Anthony finds out that Tuga is embarrassed of his father's profession.
7	"Flo's Dream"	James Widdoes	Jay Dyer	October 31, 2003	176856	2.23
Anthony plans a surprise birthday party for Flo.
8	"Everyone Plays"	James Widdoes	Peter Murrieta	November 7, 2003	176857	3.05
Joe insists on taking over for Anthony as a Tee Ball coach.
9	"Joe's Big Break"	James Widdoes	Jacque Edmonds Cofer	November 14, 2003	176858	2.29
Anthony and Joe bets on who can land an acting job first. Lydia discovers that the only reason she has been asked to speak at a fundraiser is because of her nationality.
10	"Training Wheels"	James Widdoes	Christopher Vane and Jay Dyer	November 21, 2003	176859	2.24
Anthony has to confess that he can't ride a bike. A young medical genius, who Lydia has been tutoring, develops a crush on her.
11	"Get Out of Dodge... Ball"	James Widdoes	Christopher Vane and Jay Dyer	January 8, 2004	176860	2.76
Dodgeball is about to get banned at Tuga's school because some parents thinks it's too rough, Anthony and Joe challenge the skeptical parents to a dodgeball game where the winning team gets to give their recommendation to the school board. Lydia's future in medicine is in jeopardy because she faints every time she sees blood.
12	"One Flew Over the Kai-Kai's Nest"	Joe Regalbuto	Devon Shepard and Adam Glass	January 15, 2004	176861	3.45
Anthony discovers that Tuga has an imaginary friend. Lydia tries to improve her love life by improving her cleavage.
13	"Home Movie"	Joe Regalbuto	Marco Pennette and Peter Murrieta	January 22, 2004	176862	3.34
Tuga is worried when he has to do a school project about his family.
14	"Time Bandit"	Joe Regalbuto	Jacque Edmonds Cofer	January 29, 2004	176863	2.93
Joe is worried that a childhood friend of Anthony might be a bad influence.
15	"Into the Woods"	Jerry Zaks	Adam Glass and Devon Shepard	February 5, 2004	176864	2.20
Anthony and Joe takes a group of kids camping.
16	"Face the Music"	Jerry Zaks	Adam Glass and Devon Shepard	February 12, 2004	176865	2.65
Anthony takes clarinet lessons again in order to encourage Tuga to continue his piano lessons.

== Reception ==
Michael Speier of Variety was generally positive in his review of All About the Andersons, noting that it was "a routine sitcom with tried-and-true mechanisms, but there's something brewing here that feels more distinct", and praised the series' star, stating "As a leading man, Anderson is a delight." Tom Shales of The Washington Post praised the "surprisingly effective dramatic moments between Anthony Anderson as a struggling actor and John Amos as Joe, his very hard-shelled dad." Tom Jicha of Sun-Sentinel was more mixed in his assessment of the series, declaring "There's a lot to like about All About the Andersons" but also warning that "Unfortunately, the material is boilerplate sitcom..."
