= List of television shows set in Washington, D.C. =

This is a list of television shows set in Washington, D.C.

== Television shows ==
Title	Year(s)	Channel	Location
Fellow Travelers	2023	Showtime	Main setting
1600 Penn	2012–13	NBC	Set at the White House
227	1985–90	NBC	Main setting
24	2001–2010	FOX	Season 7 main setting
24: Legacy	2017	FOX	Main setting
The Agency	2001–03	CBS	Set in Langley, Virginia at CIA Headquarters
Agent X	2015	TNT	Main setting
All's Fair	1976–77	CBS	Main setting
Allegiance	2015	NBC	Main setting
Alpha House	2013–14	Amazon Prime	Main setting
American Dad!	2005–present	FOX, TBS	Set in a fictional DC suburb of Langley Falls, Virginia, a combination of Langley and Great Falls, Virginia
The Americans	2013–18	FX	Mainly set in Falls Church, Virginia and Washington, D.C.
Anthony Bourdain: No Reservations	2009	Travel Channel	Season 5 Episode 3
Baby, I'm Back	1978	CBS	Main setting
Ball Four	1976	CBS	Main setting
The Best Thing I Ever Ate	2009	Food Network	Season 4 Episodes 12 & 14, Season 5 Episodes 4 & 10
The Blacklist	2013–present	NBC	Main setting
Bones	2005–17	FOX	Main setting
BrainDead	2016	CBS	Main setting
Bridges to Cross	1986	CBS	Main setting
The Brink	2015	HBO	Main setting
Built to Last	1997	NBC	Main setting
Capital News	1990	ABC	Main setting
Capitol	1982–87	CBS	Main setting
Capitol Critters	1992	ABC	Main setting
Charlie Lawrence	2003	CBS	Main setting
Chefs vs. City	2010	Food Network	Season 2 Episode 13
Clarice	2021–present	CBS	Main setting
Commander in Chief	2005–2006	ABC	Set at the White House
Cory in the House	2007–2008	Disney Channel	Main setting
The Court	2002	ABC	Main setting
Covert Affairs	2010–2015	USA Network	Main setting
Criminal Minds	2005–20	CBS	Set in Quantico, Virginia, just south of DC at the FBI Academy
Crisis	2014	NBC	Main setting
Cross	2024	Amazon Prime	Main setting
CSI: Cyber	2015–16	CBS	Main setting
DAG	2000–01	NBC	Main setting
D.C.	2000	The WB	Main setting
DC Cupcakes	2010–13	TLC	Set at Georgetown Cupcake
D.C. Follies	1987–89	Syndication	Main setting
Deaf U	2020	Netflix	Set at Gallaudet University
Designated Survivor	2016–19	ABC	Main setting
Diners, Drive-Ins and Dives	2015	Food Network	Season 23 Episode 14
The Diplomat	2023	Netflix	
The District	2000–04	CBS	Main setting
Dr. Know	2005–06	Discovery Health	Main setting
E-Ring	2005–06	NBC	Set at the Pentagon, in the DC suburb of Arlington County, Virginia
Earth: Final Conflict	1997–2002	Syndication	
The Event	2010–11	NBC	
The F.B.I.	1965–74	ABC	Main setting
The Falcon and the Winter Soldier	2021–present	Disney+	
The Farmer's Daughter	1963–66	ABC	Main setting
The Firm	2012	NBC	
The First Family	2012–15	Syndication	Set at the White House
The First Lady	2022-present	Showtime	Main setting
First Monday	2002	CBS	Main setting
FM	1989–90	NBC	Main setting
Freakazoid!	1995–97	The WB	Main setting
Get Smart (1965–70)	1965–70	NBC, CBS	Main setting
Get Smart (1995)	1995	FOX	Main setting
The Girlfriend Experience	2016–present	Starz	Season 2 main setting
Goodtime Girls	1980	ABC	Main setting
Grandpa Goes to Washington	1978–79	NBC	Main setting
Hail to the Chief	1985	ABC	Main setting
The Handmaid's Tale	2017–2025	Hulu	
Hearts Afire	1992–95	CBS	Main setting
Homeland	2011–20	Showtime	Main setting
Hostages	2013–14	CBS	Main setting
The Hot Zone	2019–present	National Geographic	Season 2 Main setting
House of Cards	2013–18	Netflix	Main setting
I Spy	1965–68	NBC	Main setting
Inside Job	2021–2022	Netflix	
Jack Ryan	2018–present	Amazon Prime	
JAG	1996–2005	NBC, CBS	Main setting
K.C. Undercover	2015–18	Disney Channel	Main setting
K Street	2003	HBO	Main setting
Karen	1975	ABC	Main setting
King & Maxwell	2013	TNT	Main setting
LateLine	1998–99	NBC	Main setting
Let's Be Real	2021–present	FOX	Main setting
Lie to Me	2009–11	FOX	Main setting
Lil' Bush	2007–08	Comedy Central	Main setting
Linc's	1998–2000	Showtime	Main setting
Line of Fire	2026–present	NBC	Main setting
Love Is Blind	2024	Netflix	Main setting
The Lyon's Den	2003	NBC	Main setting
Madam Secretary	2014–19	CBS	Main setting
Más sabe el diablo	2009–10	NBC	Main setting
A Man Called Hawk	1989	ABC	Main setting
The Man in the High Castle	2015–2019	Amazon Prime Video	
Mancuso, F.B.I.	1989–90	NBC	Main setting
The Millers	2013–15	CBS	Set in the suburb of Leesburg, Virginia
Mindhunter	2017–19	Netflix	
Minority Report	2015	FOX	Main setting
Mr. President	1987–88	FOX	Main setting
Mr. Smith Goes to Washington	1962–63	ABC	Main setting
Mister Sterling	2003	NBC	Main setting
The Monroes	1995	ABC	Main setting
Murphy Brown	1988–98, 2018	CBS	Main setting
Nancy	1970–71	NBC	Main setting
NCIS	2003–present	CBS	Main setting
The New Adventures of Beans Baxter	1987	FOX	Main setting
The Night Agent	2023–present	Netflix	Main Setting
Outlaw	2010	NBC	
Our Cartoon President	2018–present	Showtime	Main setting
The Oval	2019–present	BET	Set at the White House
Parks and Recreation	2009–2015	NBC	Setting for select episodes starting in Season 5
Powerhouse	1982	PBS	Main setting
The Powers That Be	1992–1993	NBC	Main setting
The President Show	2017	Comedy Central	Main setting
Quantico	2015–2018	ABC	Set in Quantico, Virginia, just south of Washington, D.C. at the FBI Academy
The Real Housewives of D.C.	2010	Bravo	Main setting
The Real Housewives of Potomac	2016–present	Bravo	Set in the DC suburb of Potomac, Maryland
The Real World: Washington, D.C.	2009–2010	MTV	Main setting
The Round Table	1992	NBC	Main setting
Salvation	2017–2018	CBS	
Scandal	2012–2018	ABC	Main setting
Scarecrow and Mrs. King	1983–1987	CBS	
The Secret Diary of Desmond Pfeiffer	1998	UPN	Main setting
The Senator	1970–71	NBC	Main setting
Smart Guy	1997–99	The WB	Main setting
'State of Affairs	2014–15	NBC	Main setting
Succession	2019	HBO	Season 2 Episode 9
Szysznyk	1977–78	CBS	Main setting
Temperatures Rising	1972–74	ABC	Main setting
That's My Bush!	2001	Comedy Central	Main setting
That's My Mama	1974–75	ABC	Main setting
Top Chef: D.C.	2010	Bravo	Main setting
Top of the Hill	1989	CBS	Main setting
Unnatural History	2010	Cartoon Network	Main setting
UC: Undercover	2001–2002	NBC	Main setting
Veep	2012–2019	HBO	Main setting
Wanda at Large	2003	FOX	Main setting
The West Wing	1999–2006	NBC	Set at the White House
Women of the House	1995	CBS	Main setting
Wonder Woman	1975–79	ABC, CBS	Main setting
The X-Files	1993–2002, 2016–2018	FOX	Main setting

== Miniseries ==
Title	Year	Channel	Location
The Assets	2014	ABC	Main setting
The Comey Rule	2020	Showtime	Main setting
Foo Fighters: Sonic Highways	2014	HBO	Episode 2
From the Earth to the Moon	1998	HBO	Episodes 1, 2, and 4
Gaslit	2022	Starz	Main setting
Impeachment: American Crime Story	2021	FX	Main setting
John Adams	2008	HBO	
The Looming Tower	2018	Hulu	Set primarily in Washington, DC and New York City
The Kennedys	2011	Reelz	Main setting
The Plot Against America	2020	HBO	Episodes 3-5
Political Animals	2012	USA Network	Main setting
Tanner '88	1988	HBO	Main setting
White House Plumbers	2023	HBO	Main setting

== News ==
Title	Year(s)	Channel	Location
CBS Evening News	2019–present	CBS	broadcast from the CBS News Washington bureau
Face the Nation	1954–present	CBS	broadcast from the CBS News Washington bureau
Fox News Sunday	1996–present	Fox News	broadcast from the Fox News Washington bureau
Hardball with Chris Matthews	1994–2020	CNBC, MSNBC	broadcast from DC
Inside Politics	1992–present	CNN	broadcast from CNN Studios Washington
The Lead with Jake Tapper	2013–present	CNN	broadcast from CNN Studios Washington
Meet the Press	1947–present	NBC	broadcast from the NBC News Washington bureau at WRC-TV
Pardon the Interruption	2001–present	ESPN	broadcast from Atlantic Media
PBS NewsHour	1975–present	PBS	broadcast from the PBS Washington station WETA-TV
The Situation Room with Wolf Blitzer	2005–present	CNN	broadcast from CNN Studios Washington
SportsCenter with SVP	2020–present	ESPN	broadcast from ABC News Washington Bureau
State of the Union	2009–present	CNN	broadcast from CNN Studios Washington
This Week	1981–present	ABC	select episodes broadcast from the ABC News Washington Bureau
Washington Journal	1995–present	C-SPAN	broadcast from C-SPAN
Washington Week	1967–present	PBS	broadcast from the PBS Washington station WETA-TV

== Stand-up comedy ==
Title	Year	Channel	Location
Bill Burr: You People Are All the Same	2012	Netflix	Lincoln Theatre
Bill Maher: Live from D.C.	2014	HBO	Warner Theatre
Chris Rock: Bring the Pain	1996	HBO	Takoma Theater
Chris Rock: Never Scared	2004	HBO	DAR Constitution Hall
Craig Ferguson: I'm Here to Help	2013	Netflix	Warner Theatre
Dave Attell: Captain Miserable	2007	HBO	Lincoln Theatre
Dave Chappelle: Equanimity	2017	Netflix	Warner Theatre
Dave Chappelle: Killin’ Them Softly	2000	HBO	Lincoln Theatre
Dave Chappelle: The Dreamer	2023	Netflix	Lincoln Theatre
Demetri Martin: Live (At The Time)	2015	Netflix	Lincoln Theatre
Dennis Miller: Live from Washington, D.C.: They Shoot HBO Specials, Don't They?	1993	HBO	Lisner Auditorium
Dennis Miller: Mr. Miller Goes to Washington	1988	HBO	Lisner Auditorium
Deon Cole: Cole Blooded Seminar	2016	Comedy Central	Lincoln Theatre
Eddie Murphy: Delirious	1983	HBO	DAR Constitution Hall
George Lopez: The Wall, Live from Washington	2017	HBO	Kennedy Center
Jeff Dunham: Spark of Insanity	2007	Comedy Central	Warner Theatre
Jim Gaffigan: Mr. Universe	2012	Netflix	Warner Theatre
Jim Norton: Monster Rain	2007	HBO	Lincoln Theatre
Leslie Jones: Time Machine	2019	Netflix	Warner Theatre
Lewis Black: Red, White & Screwed	2006	HBO	Warner Theatre
Louis C.K: 2017	2017	Netflix	DAR Constitution Hall
Matt Rife: Natural Selection	2023	Netflix	DAR Constitution Hall
Martin Lawrence: Runteldat	2002	Showtime	DAR Constitution Hall
Maz Jobrani: Immigrant	2017	Netflix	Kennedy Center
Mike Epps: Only One Mike	2019	Netflix	DAR Constitution Hall
Nick Kroll: Little Big Boy	2022	Netflix	Warner Theatre
Patton Oswalt: My Weakness Is Strong	2009	Comedy Central	Lisner Auditorium
Robin Williams: Weapons of Self Destruction	2009	HBO	DAR Constitution Hall
Trevor Noah: Lost In Translation	2015	Comedy Central	Lincoln Theatre
Wanda Sykes: I'ma Be Me	2009	HBO	Warner Theatre
Whitney Cummings: Can I Touch It?	2019	Netflix	Sidney Harmon Hall
Whitney Cummings: Money Shot	2010	Comedy Central	Sidney Harmon Hall
Yvonne Orji: Momma, I Made It!	2020	HBO	Howard Theatre
