= Caroline in the City =

American television sitcom (1995–1999)

- Genre: Sitcom
- Created by: Fred Barron; Dottie Dartland; Marco Pennette
- Starring: Lea Thompson; Eric Lutes; Malcolm Gets; Amy Pietz; Andy Lauer
- Theme music composer: Jonathan Wolff
- Country of origin: United States
- Original language: English
- No. of seasons: 4
- No. of episodes: 97 (1 unaired) (list of episodes)

Production
- Executive producers: Fred Barron; Dottie Dartland; Marco Pennette
- Producer: Faye Oshima Belyeu
- Camera setup: Multi-camera
- Running time: 20–22 minutes
- Production companies: Barron/Pennette Productions; 3 Sisters Entertainment; CBS Productions

Original release
- Network: NBC
- Release: September 21, 1995 – April 26, 1999

Caroline in the City is an American television sitcom that ran on NBC from 1995 until 1999. It stars Lea Thompson as cartoonist Caroline Duffy, who lives in Manhattan. The rest of the cast includes Eric Lutes, Malcolm Gets, Amy Pietz, and Andy Lauer. The series premiered on September 21, 1995, in the "Must See TV" Thursday night block between Seinfeld and ER and ran for 97 episodes over four seasons before it was cancelled; the final episode was broadcast on April 26, 1999. The series was produced by Barron/Pennette Productions, 3 Sisters Entertainment and CBS Productions.

== Summary ==
Caroline Duffy (Lea Thompson), a cartoonist who lives in Manhattan, spends a lot of time with dates and lovers, and meddles in the lives of her friends and neighbors. In the pilot episode, she has broken up with Del Cassidy (Eric Lutes), who quickly finds another date. She hires Richard Karinsky (Malcolm Gets) to be her new colorist, and he pretends to be her new boyfriend during a dinner to prevent her from being embarrassed over Del's moving on. During the first season, Richard develops feelings for Caroline.

Caroline's success as a cartoonist is displayed throughout the first season; her cartoon character gets a balloon in the Macy's Thanksgiving Day Parade, she has a park dedicated to her in her native Peshtigo, Wisconsin, and she even has an offer for a cereal brand. When she was a child, she drew violent pictures of her brother Chris, and after dropping out of college, she started doodling at a copywriting job. It took less than five years for her cartoon to become nationally syndicated, and she even appeared on The Today Show.

Towards the end of season one, Del proposes to Caroline. Richard is distressed by this, and searches for a new job. Although Richard has kept his feelings secret, their friends Annie Spadaro (Amy Pietz) and Remo (Tom La Grua) figure out that he loves Caroline. The day before the wedding, Richard writes her a love letter where he asks Caroline to meet him at Remo's if she loves him. He leaves the letter in a pile of wedding thank-you cards. Caroline arrives at Remo's but does not mention the letter, and continues with the wedding plans. Richard decides to leave Manhattan. When Caroline and Del call off the wedding, Caroline visits Richard's apartment but he has left.

In the second season, Richard returns to Manhattan after having been in Paris where he had tried to sell paintings. Caroline gives the thank-you cards to a friend; Richard tries to find and destroy the love letter; he tosses it out of the window, only to have Annie find it. He resumes his old job as Caroline's colorist. Later, Caroline discovers that she has feelings for Richard; however, Richard has reunited with his former girlfriend Julia, whom he met in Manhattan. Caroline leaves a message on his answering machine telling him that she loves him, but Julia discovers it and erases it.

Richard and Julia get married which prompts a bitter love triangle among the three. Richard eventually splits with Julia.

Caroline and Richard eventually become a couple. However, they split after arguing over whether to have children; Richard learned that Julia had a child. In the final episode, which ends on an unresolved cliffhanger, Annie and Del are now in a new relationship, while Caroline is about to marry another man—her childhood friend Randy—when Richard shows up at the wedding.

== Characters ==
=== Main ===
- Caroline Duffy (Lea Thompson) – Caroline is a cartoonist of the comic strip Caroline in the City. Originally from Peshtigo, Wisconsin, Caroline has a need for people to like her. She meddles in the lives of her friends and people around her, and often gets into trouble because of it. She initially breaks her engagement to Del Cassidy, but remains friends with him. She hires Richard Karinsky to be her colorist. Although Richard has feelings for Caroline, she does not realize or reciprocate until the end of the second season. She dates veterinarian Joe DeStefano in the second season, and former classmates Trevor and Randy in the third and fourth seasons. She becomes engaged to Randy, but her wedding ceremony is interrupted when Richard appears.
- Del Cassidy (Eric Lutes) – Del works at a greeting card company owned by his father, and manages the Caroline in the City comic strip card products. He is Caroline's sometimes boyfriend; they get engaged during the first season, but break it off in the season finale. After receiving one too many insults from his callous father, Del quits to build his own business, Eagle Greeting Cards. In the fourth season, he sells the business to a large entertainment conglomerate.
- Richard Karinsky (Malcolm Gets) – Richard is the colorist for the Caroline in the City comic strip. He is a struggling artist who usually lives in the slummy parts of New York City, and is regularly embarrassed about the nature of his job. He has several chances for a big break, but they end up in failure. He is also an excellent pianist. He has a substantial student loan debt from attending an unnamed art school. He has a sarcastic personality, especially with Annie. He falls in love with Caroline during the first season, and does not think highly of Del Cassidy and his lack of intelligence. Eventually he and Caroline have a relationship.
- Annie Spadaro (Amy Pietz) – Annie is Caroline's across the hall neighbor and her best friend. She is a dancer in the Broadway production of Cats. She is sexually promiscuous and this makes her a constant target for Richard's wisecracks. After Richard writes Caroline a love letter which he later regrets, Annie comes across the letter and uses it to blackmail him until her sister uses it for a song. After meeting Shadoe Stevens in Los Angeles, she quits her job and rushes to California to shoot a television pilot. Unfortunately, the pilot is not picked up, and she becomes unemployed.
- Charlie (Andy Lauer) – He is a delivery man in Del's father's company, and after Del is fired, they become partners in new company Eagle Greeting Cards. He constantly wears roller blades, even when he is not making deliveries. He has a poor grasp on reality. In the last season, he moves to Europe.

=== Recurring ===
- Remo (Tom La Grua) – Remo owns the Italian restaurant, Remo's Ristorante, where the main characters usually hang out.
- Gianni (John Mariano) – A waiter at Remo's Ristorante.
- Joe DeStefano (Mark Feuerstein) – A veterinarian who dated Caroline, and came close to moving into her apartment. However, after he tells Caroline that he slept with his ex-girlfriend, he and Caroline split.
- Julia Mazzone Karinsky (Sofia Milos) – Richard's former girlfriend and love of Richard's life (as he calls it 'sincero amore'—the love that one does not have to question). She first met Richard in Italy, and during the third season, they get married. Her father, an Italian businessman, does not approve of their relationship and tries to destroy Richard, first physically, then economically.
- Trevor (Robert Gant) – Trevor is Caroline's boyfriend during the third season. He owns a computer company and has a German shepherd dog. When Caroline rushes to Spain to meet Richard and Julia, Trevor realizes that he will never win a place in Caroline's heart.
- Randy (Anthony Tyler Quinn) – Randy is a pediatrician and schoolmate of Caroline from Peshtigo, Wisconsin. He initially reunites with Caroline during the fourth season; he buys Caroline's parents' house, but agrees to sell it to Caroline and rent it from her. When he arrives in New York for the pediatricians seminar they meet again, and Caroline realizes that she harbors some feelings for him, even though she is in a relationship with Richard. After Richard goes to Italy to take care of his son, Annie brings Randy to cheer Caroline up, and he falls in love with Caroline. They have a wedding in the final episode.
- Angie Spadaro (Candice Azzara) – Annie's mother who regularly visits Annie's flat and drives her crazy. She gets divorced in the third season.
- Pete Spadaro (Adam Ferrara) – Annie's brother who worked at their father's undertaking company. He is influenced by Richard to try some other occupations including an electrician and a painter.
- Shelly (Lauren Graham) – Richard's short-term girlfriend. Richard was desperate to break up with her, but she always had a reason not to.
- Elevator Lady (Cathy Ladman) – Caroline's neighbor from one of the upper floors. She often appears in key dialogues when someone enters the elevator.
- Peter Welmerling (Peter Krause) – Someone Caroline knew from her home town who goes to the opera with her on a date.

=== Notable guests ===
This is a list of the notable guest stars in the series. Some of them appear as their characters from related NBC series that aired around the same time.

Actor	Character	Episode	Notes
Marvin Hamlisch	Himself	"Caroline and the Bitter Beast"	
Matthew Perry	Chandler Bing	"Caroline and the Folks"	Crossover appearance. Annie meets Chandler at the video store. The same night, Thompson appeared as Caroline in the November 2, 1995 Friends episode "The One with the Baby on the Bus".
Jonathan Silverman	Jonathan Eliot	"Caroline and the Folks"	Appears briefly as his character from his sitcom The Single Guy
Jean Stapleton	Mary Kosky	"Caroline and the Opera"	Stapleton plays Caroline's aunt in the episode.
Jane Leeves	Daphne Moon	"Caroline and the Bad Back"	Frasier cameo crossover appearance at the end of the episode, as Daphne and Niles read a Caroline in the City comic in Frasier's Seattle apartment.
David Hyde Pierce	Niles Crane	"Caroline and the Bad Back"	Frasier cameo crossover appearance at the end of the episode.
David Hyde Pierce	Jimmy Callahan	"Caroline and the Cat Dancer"	Pierce plays an IRS agent who hopes to win a role alongside Annie in Broadway's Cats. Appearances were also made by Frasier actors Dan Butler, Harriet Sansom Harris, and Edward Hibbert, but none of them appeared as their characters from the show.
Sharon Lawrence	Maddie	"Caroline and the Proposal"	
John Landis	Himself	"Caroline and the Movie"	
Florence Henderson	Herself	"Caroline and the Balloon"	
Elizabeth Ashley	Natalie Karinsky	"Caroline and Richard's Mom" "Caroline and the Bad Trip"	Ashley plays Richard's mother in these episodes.
Morey Amsterdam	Vic Stansky	"Caroline and the Watch"	Alumni from The Dick Van Dyke Show appeared with Stella Dawson as an elderly married couple. Amsterdam died later that year, making the episode his last television appearance.
Rose Marie	Stella Dawson	"Caroline and the Watch" "Caroline and the Kept Man"	Alumna from The Dick Van Dyke Show appeared with Vic Stansky as an elderly married couple.
Phil Hartman	Host (uncredited)	"Caroline and the Letter"	In a parody of The Twilight Zone, the host describes the viewers entering the "Caroline Zone".
Thomas Gibson	William Stevens	"Caroline and the Nice Jewish Boy"	Gibson plays Caroline's old boyfriend.
Julie Andrews	Herself	"Caroline and Victor/Victoria"	Andrews has an audio cameo in this episode.
Andrea Bendewald	Leslie	"Caroline and Victor/Victoria"	
French Stewart	Stu	"Caroline and the Long Shot"	Stewart plays a reporter who covers Richard in this episode.
Debra Jo Rupp	Melody	"Caroline and the Red Sauce"	Rupp plays Richard's boss in this episode.
George Segal	Bob Anderson	"Caroline and the Buyer"	
Brian George	Mr. Tedescu	"Caroline and the Ombudsman"	George plays Caroline's super in the episode.
Shadoe Stevens	Himself	"Caroline and the Wayward Husband"	Stevens inspires Annie to go to Los Angeles to try to become an actress.
Judd Hirsch	Ben Karinsky	"Caroline and the Comic"	Hirsch plays Richard's father in the episode.
Jay Leno	Himself	"Caroline and the Bad Trip"	
J.C. Wendel	Candy	"Caroline and Richard & Julia"	
Dan Butler	Kenneth Arabian	"Caroline and the Gay Art Show" "Caroline and the Dearly Departed".	Owner of an art gallery that has dealings with Richard in two episodes.
Dan Futterman	Seth	"Caroline and the Cold Sesame Noodles"	Seth is introduced as a new love interest for Annie. Futterman only appears in one episode but the character becomes recurring, being mentioned in a few other episodes and appearing in one more, "Caroline and the Quiz Show", now played by a new actor, David Kriegel.
Scott Atkinson	Brett	"Caroline and the Getaway"	
Shia LaBeouf	Ethan	"Caroline and the Bar Mitzvah"	First television appearance; LaBeouf was then aged 12.

== Episodes ==
Season	Episodes	Originally released		Rank	Rating
Season	Episodes	First released	Last released	Rank	Rating
1	24	September 21, 1995	August 5, 1996	4	18.0
2	25	September 17, 1996	May 13, 1997	25	11.0
3	26	September 22, 1997	May 18, 1998	47	8.4
4	22	September 21, 1998	April 26, 1999	91	8.8

== Background/production ==
The show was filmed at the CBS Studio Center in Los Angeles, California.

== Illustrations and animations ==
Bonnie Timmons drew the illustrations and animations that are supposed to represent Caroline's eponymous in-show comic strip.

== Connections with other sitcoms ==
=== Connections with Frasier ===
Though not officially a companion show to Frasier, Caroline in the City exists in the same universe (so likely also connects to both Cheers and Wings as well) with several crossovers and connections. Not only does the end of one early first-season episode feature Frasier characters, Daphne and Niles, in Frasier's apartment (filmed on Frasier's set at the Paramount lot and guest-starring Jane Leeves and David Hyde Pierce as their characters) looking at a Caroline in the City cartoon,.

No other actors made crossover appearances: lead Eric Lutes played Frasier's boss Tom Duran in two episodes. David Hyde Pierce also appears a second time as another character, this time playing an IRS man who dreams of being in Cats. Dan Butler (Bulldog in Frasier) had a recurring role as a museum owner, plus Frasier actors Harriet Sansom Harris (Bebe) and Edward Hibbert (Gil) appear in the same third-season episode as each other, playing different characters (and not sharing any scenes). Additionally, Scott Atkinson (who portrayed Daphne's ex-boyfriend, Clive, in a Frasier episode) also appears playing Caroline's love interest in one episode.

=== Connection with Friends ===
Matthew Perry appears as his Friends character Chandler Bing (not named but implied to be him and advertised by the network as such in their crossover promotions) in the episode "Caroline and the Folks" in a crossover appearance in which Annie meets Chandler at the video store. The same night, Lea Thompson appeared as Caroline Duffy (also never named as such but implied to be—and advertised as—her character) in the November 2, 1995 Friends episode "The One with the Baby on the Bus".

=== Connection with The Single Guy ===
In the same episode—"Caroline and the Folks"—which featured Chandler from Friends, Jonathan Silverman also appeared, playing his character Jonathan Eliot (again not named but advertised as such) from the sitcom The Single Guy.

== Broadcast ==
Season	Time slot	Notes
1 (1995–96)	Thursdays, 9:30 p.m.	Part of the "Must See TV" lineup
2 (1996–97)	Tuesdays, 9:30 p.m.	
3 (1997–98)	Mondays, 9:00 p.m.	Part of the "Must She TV" lineup which included Suddenly Susan, Fired Up, and The Naked Truth
4 (1998–99)	Mondays, 8:30 p.m.	

== Reception ==
=== Ratings ===
Season	Season premiere	Season finale	TV season	Season rank	Households (in millions)	Rating
1	September 21, 1995	May 16, 1996	1995–96	4	17.26	—N/a
2	September 17, 1996	May 13, 1997	1996–97	25	10.67	—N/a
3	September 22, 1997	May 18, 1998	1997–98	47	8.4	—N/a
4	September 21, 1998	April 26, 1999	1998–99	91	8.8	—N/a

== Home media ==
CBS DVD (distributed by Paramount) released the first two seasons on DVD in Region 1 in 2008/2009. A decade later, the remaining two seasons were both released (though lacking episodes) in Region 1 on August 6, 2019.

In Region 2, Revelation Films released all four seasons on DVD between August 2005 and June 2006.

In Region 4, Visual Entertainment has released the first two seasons on DVD in Australia.

Season	Ep #	Release Dates		
Season	Ep #	Region 1	Region 2	Region 4
1	24	August 12, 2008	August 22, 2005	March 8, 2010
2	25	March 10, 2009	November 7, 2005	October 15, 2010
3	26	August 6, 2019	February 20, 2006	TBA
4	22	August 6, 2019	June 26, 2006	TBA
