= Switched at Birth season 3 =

Switched at Birth
- Season 3
- Starring: Sean Berdy; Lucas Grabeel; Katie Leclerc; Vanessa Marano; Constance Marie; Gilles Marini; D. W. Moffett; Lea Thompson
- No. of episodes: 22

Release
- Original network: ABC Family
- Original release: January 13 – December 8, 2014

Season chronology
- ← Previous; Season 2 Next → Season 4

The third season of ABC Family drama television series Switched at Birth began on January 13, 2014, and consists of 22 episodes. The season is produced by ABC Family, Pirates' Cove Entertainment, and Suzy B Productions, with Paul Stupin and series creator Lizzy Weiss serving as executive producers.

The one-hour scripted drama revolves around two young women who discover they were switched at birth and grew up in very different environments. While balancing school, jobs, and their unconventional family, the girls, along with their friends and family, experience deaf culture, relationships, class differences, racism, audism, and other social issues.

== Cast ==
=== Main ===
- Sean Berdy as Emmett Bledsoe
- Lucas Grabeel as Toby Kennish
- Katie Leclerc as Daphne Paloma Vasquez
- Vanessa Marano as Bay Madeleine Kennish
- Constance Marie as Regina Vasquez
- Gilles Marini as Angelo Sorrento
- D. W. Moffett as John Kennish
- Lea Thompson as Kathryn Kennish

=== Recurring ===
- Max Adler as Miles "Tank" Conroy
- Ryan Lane as Travis Barnes
- Bianca Bethune as Sharee Gifford
- Kenneth Mitchell as Wes Gable
- B.K. Cannon as Mary Beth Tucker
- RJ Mitte as Campbell Bingman
- Daniel Durant as Matthew
- Marlee Matlin as Melody Bledsoe
- Stephanie Nogueras as Natalie Pierce
- Al White as Dr. Elroy Jackson
- David Castañeda as Jorge
- Alec Mapa as Renzo
- Ivonne Coll as Adrianna Vasquez
- Rachel Shenton as Lily Summers
- Sandra Bernhard as Teresa Ledarsky
- Rene Moran as Nacho Rivera
- Carlease Burke as Ms. Rose
- Cassi Thomson as Nikki Papagus
- Joey Lauren Adams as Jennice Papagus
- Anthony Natale as Cameron Bledsoe
- Matthew Risch as Chip Coto
- Kari Coleman as Whitney
- Erica Gimpel as Yvette Gifford
- Nathalia Ramos as Gretchen
- Natalie Amenula as Monica
- Suanne Spoke as Karen Barnes
- Madison Saager as Heather
- Jackie Debatin as Sarah Lazar
- Briana Lane as Christy Salz
- Sandra Purpuro as Anita
- Stephanie Mieko Cohen as Darla
- Larry Sullivan as Leo
- Jill Remez as Juanita
- Nyle DiMarco as Garrett Banducci
- Malana Lea as Jess
- Laura Brown as Debbie
- Iris Almario as Felicia

== Episodes ==
No. overall	No. in season	Title	Directed by	Written by	Original release date	US viewers (millions)
52	1	"Drowning Girl"	Jim Hayman	Lizzy Weiss	January 13, 2014	1.76
After the blackmailing incident, Daphne is ordered to do community service at a free clinic. She meets Campbell (RJ Mitte), a former snowboarder who sustained serious injuries after an accident. Her relationship with John continues to be tense. The deaf students at Carlton are unhappy about the new students that were forced to relocate to the school due to district budget cuts. Daphne starts off on bad terms with a troubled girl named Sharee. Meanwhile, Bay is taking a college art class and is partnered up with a fraternity pledge, Tank (Max Adler). Toby finds his life as a newlywed at a standstill while Nikki is off doing missionary work in Peru. When her boss decides to sell the business, Regina hopes to buy the place with Angelo's help. Kathryn has started seeing a psychiatrist after going through a bout of depression and finds light in taking dance classes, which she hides from John. Title reference: From the 1963 painting Drowning Girl by Roy Lichtenstein.
53	2	"Your Body Is a Battleground"	Lea Thompson	James Stoteraux & Chad Fiveash	January 20, 2014	1.56
Daphne and Toby try to convince Bay to join the newly-formed field hockey team so that they'll have enough players. Bay's confidence in her artistic abilities goes down when her teacher says that her piece on Tank lacks depth. Tank narrowly escapes being kicked out of the class after he fails to complete his portrait of Bay from the night of the party. John finds out that Kathryn has been hanging out with other people and sneaking off to dance classes, so Kathryn invites her dance friend, Renzo, over for dinner. At the clinic, Daphne and Campbell have to track down a patient after Daphne let him go before properly checking out. She also tries to recruit Sharee to join field hockey after Toby finds out that Sharee is a star athlete. Meanwhile, after Emmett catches the Carlton vandal on camera, he suspects that the one who has been targeting the deaf students is one of his deaf friends. Title reference: From the 1989 protest poster Your Body Is a Battleground by Barbara Kruger.
54	3	"Fountain"	Allan Arkush	Joy Gregory & Terrence Coli	January 27, 2014	1.55
Bay asks her new art teacher for a letter of recommendation for an art school application and gets invited to an art show in Minneapolis. Tank joins them. Emmett is put in a tough position after confronting a fellow deaf student about the vandalism, with Travis encouraging him to keep quiet so that the new hearing students can take the blame. Sharee is mistakenly blamed for the tire slashing, but Daphne helps argue her case and get her expulsion rescinded. However, Sharee and Daphne clash and both end up in detention, making them miss their field hockey game, to Toby's frustration. Title reference: From the 1917 artpiece Fountain by Marcel Duchamp.
55	4	"It Hurts to Wait With Love if Love Is Somewhere Else"	Melanie Mayron	Linda Gase & Henry Robles	February 3, 2014	1.62
Jorge invites Daphne to a family barbecue where she is confronted about the Senator Coto ordeal. John surprises the family with an unusual purchase. Bay discovers that Emmett is dating again and has conflicting feelings. Regina and Angelo have a discussion about business. Title reference: From the 1971 painting It Hurts to Wait With Love if Love Is Somewhere Else by Friedensreich Hundertwasser.
56	5	"Have You Really the Courage?"	Zetna Fuentes	Bekah Brunstetter	February 10, 2014	1.70
John bonds with Nikki's mom, Jennice, when they help Toby move into his new apartment. John invites her to his house to watch a boxing match and they end up kissing, which Regina sees through the window. Kathryn goes to New York City with Renzo to pitch an idea for a second book. Daphne tells Bay that Tank has a crush on her. Bay later rejoins the field hockey team for college admissions appeal. Daphne worries about Sharee after witnessing an altercation outside of Sharee's house and Regina gets involved. Title reference: From the 1900s painting Have You Really the Courage? by Harry Clarke.
57	6	"The Scream"	Jonathan Frakes	Chad Fiveash & James Stoteraux	February 17, 2014	1.70
Kathryn and Renzo host a murder mystery-themed party to commemorate her recent book deal. The Kennishes and Vasquezes (minus Daphne) all attend, as well as Tank and Jennice. Jennice and John try to keep their kiss a secret and Regina decides whether or not to tell Kathryn. Bay realizes her feelings for Tank but worries about why he didn't invite her to a party at his fraternity. Meanwhile, Daphne throws a 21st birthday party for Campbell. Title reference: From the 1895 painting The Scream by Edvard Munch.
58	7	"Memory Is Your Image of Perfection"	Lee Rose	Terrence Coli	February 24, 2014	1.63
John temporarily moves in with Toby, who is unhappy about the situation. Toby and Bay try to get their parents to reconnect at a family outing, but Kathryn is adamant about finding her own independence. Melody preps Travis for an important college interview that he ends up skipping. Regina is in hot water with her boss after Adriana speaks out at a meeting against renovating East Riverside. Daphne tries to convince Sharee to get her mother some help with her mental issues. Bay comes across serious problems with her injured hand that could affect her future art career. Title reference: From the 1982 photograph Memory Is Your Image of Perfection by Barbara Kruger.
59	8	"Dance Me to the End of Love"	Millicent Shelton	Michael V. Ross & Lizzy Weiss	March 3, 2014	1.61
Daphne shows an interest in the medical profession and tries to take on more responsibility at the clinic. Bay struggles with the limitations of her injury. Travis tries to learn dancing before attending a school formal with Mary Beth. Bay's art teacher shows no leniency about Bay's hand injury and demands that she work harder, and Bay succeeds in finding new ways to create her art with the help of Emmett. John tries to earn Kathryn's forgiveness, but fails to understand what she wants. Title reference: From the 1998 painting Dance Me to the End of Love by Jack Vettriano.
60	9	"The Past (Forgotten-Swallowed)"	Fred Gerber	Joy Gregory	March 10, 2014	1.39
Good intentions lead to hurt feelings. John invites one of his former baseball colleagues over to get some dirt for Kathryn's book. Toby tutors Sharee in physics to make sure she remains eligible for field hockey. Daphne is invited to a clinic fundraiser and Regina tries to help Angelo by suggesting that his restaurant cater the event. Campbell and Jorge both remain interested in Daphne. Bay's relationship with Tank suffers because of Mary Beth's disapproval. Title reference: From the 1901 painting The Past (Forgotten-Swallowed) by Alfred Kubin.
61	10	"The Ambush"	Allan Arkush	Henry Robles & Bekah Brunstetter	March 17, 2014	1.18
Bay enlists Tank to help her strike back when the rivalry between Carlton and Buckner field hockey team get heated. Toby gets a surprise visit from Nikki, who tells him that she wants to live in Peru. Regina discovers Wes is scamming the people of East Riverside. Daphne must choose between Campbell and Jorge. Bay and Daphne prepare for the big game. Title reference: From the 1896 painting The Ambush by Charles Marion Russell.
62	11	"Love Seduces Innocence, Pleasure Entraps, and Remorse Follows"	Steve Miner	Linda Gase & Lizzy Weiss	March 24, 2014	1.30
Kathryn's new book is leaked to the public before its release. Daphne has an unexpected encounter at the clinic with a man from her past. Regina feels a sense of guilt about her behavior in East Riverside. Back at K&D designs, someone throws a brick through her studio's window threatening her not to come back to East Riverside. Toby tries to go after Nikki. Meanwhile, Bay is skeptical about Emmett's new girlfriend. Title reference: From the 1809 painting Love Seduces Innocence, Pleasure Entraps, and Remorse Follows by Pierre-Paul Prud'hon.
63	12	"Love Among the Ruins"	Norman Buckley	Lizzy Weiss	June 16, 2014	1.17
Toby travels to Iceland. Melody wants to put an end to Emmett getting bullied by Matthew. Meanwhile Bay feels torn between her feelings for Emmett and Tank and Emmett asks Bay if she's going to break up with Tank. Daphne is determined to hunt down the individual who vandalized Regina's studio. John discovers that Bay looked up where to buy morning after pills. Daphne asks Angelo to move into the guest house with her and Regina. Title reference: From the 1873 painting Love Among the Ruins by Edward Burne-Jones.
64	13	"Like a Snowball Down a Mountain"	Melanie Mayron	James Patrick Stoteraux & Chad Fiveash	June 23, 2014	1.41
Bay and Emmett make an unexpected discovery as they deal with Matthew's blackmail threat. Daphne receives an opportunity at the clinic but worries how it will affect her boyfriend Campbell. Bay breaks up with Tank telling him they should just go back to being friends but John mistakenly confronts a heartbroken Tank about Bay having to get the morning after pill. Someone from Kathryn's past threatens the publication of her book. Regina is watched while going to work by a man sitting in his car waiting for her. Title reference: From the 2002 painting Like a snowball down a mountain by Damien Hirst
65	14	"Oh, Future!"	Zetna Fuentes	Henry Robles	June 30, 2014	1.15
When Bay discovers Melody is considering an out-of-state move that would take Emmett with her, Bay encourages Emmett to strengthen his relationship with his father. Kathryn and John clash with Regina over funding Daphne's college expenses. Daphne interviews for a Latina college scholarship. Mary-Beth surprises Travis when she tracks down football player Derrick Coleman. Cameron gives Emmett big news. Title reference: From the 1933 painting Oh, Future! by Nicholas Roerich
66	15	"And We Bring the Light"	James Hayman	Joy Gregory & Alexander Georgakis	July 7, 2014	1.33
Toby returns from a soul-searching trip to Iceland after his failed marriage with a new perspective and surprising aspiration for his career. Bay gets a response from the Pratt Institute. Angelo helps Daphne redirect her senior year stresses with a baking challenge. Meanwhile Regina's participation in the East Riverside project brings her to yet another moral crossroad. A terrible car accident puts Angelo in the hospital and it is unknown if he will survive. Title reference: From the 1922 painting And We Bring the Light by Nicholas Roerich
67	16	"The Image Disappears"	Wendey Stanzler	Terrence Coli & Linda Gase	July 14, 2014	1.56
A serious accident has left Angelo in the hospital fighting to survive while others place blame as emotions run high. The Kennish and Vasquez families rally to support Angelo. Amid the emotion, decisions must be made and lives are changed forever. The doctors say that Angelo is brain dead. Bay and Emmett find Angelo's will, which says that he wishes to be unhooked from machines keeping him alive. At the end of the episode, it is revealed that Angelo died from an aneurysm, caused by being really angry at Regina. Daphne blames Regina for Angelo's death. Title reference: From the 1938 painting The Image Disappears by Salvador Dalí
68	17	"Girl With Death Mask (She Plays Alone)"	Joanna Kerns	Bekah Brunstetter & Lizzy Weiss	July 21, 2014	1.36
Seeing that Bay and Daphne are still depressed about Angelo's death after two weeks, John suggests a trip to Chicago to find Bay's second cousin from Angelo's side of the family and give Daphne a chance to tour prospective colleges. But the trip goes south when Daphne uses the opportunity to act out and Bay receives news regarding Angelo's family history. Kathryn steps in when Regina forgets Leo is scheduled to bring Abby for a visit. Toby has his first gig as a DJ at a bar, where Tank meets Emmett. Title reference: From the 1938 painting Girl With Death Mask (She Plays Alone) by Frida Kahlo
69	18	"It Isn't What You Think"	Ron Lagomarsino	J.R. Phillips & Henry Robles	July 28, 2014	1.13
Daphne and Travis get their admission results from Gallaudet University. Bay tries being Tank's friend and supports him when he meets his dad for dinner. Toby and Lily get into a conflict regarding Sharee's make-up exam. Title reference: From the 2009 painting It Isn't What You Think by Christopher Willard
70	19	"You Will Not Escape"	Michael Lange	Joy Gregory	August 4, 2014	1.29
Looking for a distraction, Daphne organizes a Senior Skip Day for her Carlton classmates, but things get out of hand. Travis attempts to drop out of Carlton to take a job at a loading dock. Bay meets with Angelo's doctor to discuss their family medical history. Meanwhile, Kathryn brings Regina to her publisher's author party in New York where they make an impression. Title reference: From the 1799 painting You Will Not Escape by Francisco Goya
71	20	"Girl on the Cliff"	D. W. Moffett	Linda Gase	August 11, 2014	1.06
Bay has second thoughts about attending the prom when dress-code rules are enacted. Meanwhile, Kathryn, John and Regina are surprised to learn the severity of Daphne's bad behavior; and Tank assists Toby with his new burgeoning business. Title reference: From the 1936 painting Girl on the Cliff by Augustus John.
72	21	"And Life Begins Right Away"	Melanie Mayron	Lizzy Weiss & William H. Brown	August 18, 2014	1.29
As their graduation day approaches, Bay and Daphne learn that Carlton will be closed forever. Daphne grows depressed as she realizes how her bad choices are sure to ruin her plans to attend medical school. Bay accompanies her as she surrenders to the police, and at the last minute Bay surprises everyone by falsely confessing to Daphne's vandalism. Title reference: From the 1974 painting And Life Begins Right Away by Robert Filliou.
73	22	"Yuletide Fortune Tellers"	Michael Grossman	Terrence Coli & Lizzy Weiss	December 8, 2014	1.40
As Bay and Daphne rebel against their mothers' Christmas traditions, a "Christmas miracle" grants them their wish of alternate lives in which they were not switched. Daphne wakes up as Bay Kennish ("Bay-Daphne") with her hearing intact, who is a skilled soccer player in training for the Olympics; while Bay wakes up as Daphne Sorrento ("Daphne-Bay"), deaf but a recognized artist, with a brother, Angelo Junior (AJ). However, these benefits come at a price: workaholic cosmetics entrepreneur Kathryn and depressed, stay-at-home has-been John are on the verge of divorce; Toby is an angst-ridden Emo; Emmett is only Daphne-Bay's platonic friend; and Regina has never conquered her alcoholism. When the girls decide this is worse, they fail at trying to reverse it at a disastrous Christmas-eve dinner party at the Kennishes, and succeed at waking up back to normal only after embracing the mothers' traditions which they once hated. Title reference: From the 1888 painting Yuletide Fortune Tellers by Mykola Pymonenko.

== Reception ==
=== U.S. ratings ===
No.	Episode	Original air date	Timeslot (EST)	Viewers (million)	Adults 18-49 rating	Cable rank (18–49)		Note
No.	Episode	Original air date	Timeslot (EST)	Viewers (million)	Adults 18-49 rating	Timeslot	Night	Note
1	"Drowning Girl"	January 13, 2014	Monday 8:00PM	1.76	0.7	#3	#22	
2	"Your Body Is a Battleground"	January 20, 2014	Monday 8:00PM	1.56	0.7	#6	#29	
3	"Fountain"	January 27, 2014	Monday 8:00PM	1.55	0.6	#4	#30	
4	"It Hurts to Wait with Love If Love Is Somewhere Else"	February 3, 2014	Monday 8:00PM	1.62	0.7	#5	#23	
5	"Have You Really the Courage?"	February 10, 2014	Monday 8:00PM	1.70	0.8	#4	#15	
6	"The Scream"	February 17, 2014	Monday 8:00PM	1.70	0.7	#5	#22	
7	"Memory Is Your Image of Perfection"	February 24, 2014	Monday 8:00PM	1.63	0.7	#4	#21	
8	"Dance Me to the End of Love"	March 3, 2014	Monday 8:00PM	1.61	0.7	#4	#22	
9	"The Past (Forgotten-Swallowed)"	March 10, 2014	Monday 8:00PM	1.39	0.6	#4	#24	
10	"The Ambush"	March 17, 2014	Monday 8:00PM	1.18	0.6	#5	#37	
11	"Love Seduces Innocence, Pleasure Entraps, and Remorse Follows"	March 24, 2014	Monday 8:00PM	1.30	0.6	#4	#31	
12	"Love Among the Ruins"	June 16, 2014	Monday 8:00PM	1.17	0.4	#5	#54	
13	"Like a Snowball Down a Mountain"	June 23, 2014	Monday 8:00PM	1.41	0.7	#3	#21	
14	"Oh, Future"	June 30, 2014	Monday 8:00PM	1.15	0.5	#3	#28	
15	"And We Bring the Light"	July 7, 2014	Monday 8:00PM	1.33	0.6	#3	#20	
16	"The Image Disappears"	July 14, 2014	Monday 8:00PM	1.56	0.7	#4	#24	
17	"Girl With Death Mask (She Plays Alone)"	July 21, 2014	Monday 8:00PM	1.36	0.6	#3	#27	
18	"It Isn't What You Think"	July 28, 2014	Monday 8:00PM	1.13	0.4	#4	#46	
19	"You Will Not Escape"	August 4, 2014	Monday 8:00PM	1.29	0.6	#4	#25	
20	"Girl on the Cliff"	August 11, 2014	Monday 8:00PM	1.06	0.5	#4	#44	
21	"And Life Begins Right Away"	August 18, 2014	Monday 8:00PM	1.29	0.5	#4	#27	
22	"Yuletide Fortune Tellers"	December 8, 2014	Monday 9:00PM	1.40	0.6	#6	#29	
