= Switched at Birth season 4 =

Switched at Birth
- Season 4
- Starring: Sean Berdy; Lucas Grabeel; Katie Leclerc; Vanessa Marano; Constance Marie; D. W. Moffett; Lea Thompson
- No. of episodes: 20

Release
- Original network: ABC Family
- Original release: January 6 – October 26, 2015

Season chronology
- ← Previous; Season 3 Next → Season 5

On August 13, 2014, ABC Family announced that it has picked up a fourth season of its hit original drama series Switched at Birth, premiering on January 6, 2015. The season is produced by ABC Family, Pirates' Cove Entertainment, and Suzy B Productions, with Paul Stupin and series creator Lizzy Weiss serving as executive producers.

The one-hour scripted drama revolves around two young women who discover they were switched at birth and grew up in very different environments. While balancing school, jobs, and their unconventional family, the girls, along with their friends and family, experience deaf culture, relationships, class differences, date rape, audism, and other social issues.

== Cast ==
=== Main ===
- Sean Berdy as Emmett Bledsoe
- Lucas Grabeel as Toby Kennish
- Katie Leclerc as Daphne Paloma Vasquez
- Vanessa Marano as Bay Madeleine Kennish
- Constance Marie as Regina Vasquez
- D. W. Moffett as John Kennish
- Lea Thompson as Kathryn Kennish

=== Recurring ===
- Ryan Lane as Travis Barnes
- Terrell Tilford as Eric Bishop
- Rachel Shenton as Lily Summers
- Adam Hagenbuch as Greg "Mingo" Shimingo
- Sharon Pierre-Louis as Iris Watkins
- Marlee Matlin as Melody Bledsoe
- Austin Cauldwell as Josh Padden
- Rana Roy as Vimla
- Alice Lee as Skye
- Max Adler as Miles "Tank" Conroy
- Bess Armstrong as Beth Marillo
- B.K. Cannon as Mary Beth Tucker
- Sarah Stouffer as Tess Ritter
- Sayeed Shahidi as Will Bishop
- Kim Hawthorne as Hope Paxton
- Stephanie Nogueras as Natalie Pierce
- Dan J. Johnson as Quinn
- Nyle DiMarco as Garrett Banducci
- Sean McGowan as Gabe
- Shainu Bala as Brandon
- Alex Wyse as Howie
- Bianca Bethune as Sharee Gifford
- Alec Mapa as Renzo
- Meredith Baxter as Bonnie Tamblyn-Dixon
- Rene Moran as Nacho Rivera
- Sam Page as Craig Tebbe
- Jill Remez as Juanita

== Episodes ==
No. overall	No. in season	Title	Directed by	Written by	Original release date	US viewers (millions)
74	1	"And It Cannot Be Changed"	Steve Miner	Lizzy Weiss	January 6, 2015	1.29
Summer is over and Daphne and Bay deal with the consequences of Bay taking the fall for Daphne. No one is happy about it, especially Emmett who has to leave for school, leaving Bay behind. Daphne decides to put off Gallaudet, going to the nearby University of Missouri–Kansas City (UMKC) so she can support Bay, who is unhappy with her decision. Title reference: Taken from the plate Y no hay remedio of The Disasters of War series by Francisco Goya, 1863.
75	2	"Bracing the Waves"	Michael Lange	Henry Robles	January 13, 2015	1.15
Bay struggles with a stubborn girl at community service who appears to hate her, but there's more to her than meets the eye. Meanwhile, Daphne struggles with Josh taking interpreting too far, Regina is still hated by the East Riverside people, and there are plans to turn Kathryn's book into a movie. Title reference: From the 1890 painting Bracing The Waves by Ivan Aivazovsky.
76	3	"I Lock the Door Upon Myself"	Glenn L. Steelman	William H. Brown & Terrence Coli	January 20, 2015	1.21
Daphne and Mingo, a hearing student on her floor, organize a dorm triathlon to compete for control over the best bathroom. Bay and Toby try to hide the fact that Bay is a convicted felon in the hopes of getting her art accepted into a showcase. Title reference: From the 1891 painting I Lock the Door Upon Myself by Fernand Khnopff.
77	4	"We Were So Close That Nothing Used to Stand Between Us"	Allan Arkush	Linda Gase & Bekah Brunstetter	January 27, 2015	1.30
Emmett pays an unexpected visit, but things don't go as planned. Daphne stresses about a D on a test. Bay goes to a party and wakes up the next morning in bed naked with Tank. Title reference: From the 1961 painting We Were So Close That Nothing Used to Stand Between Us by Vasile Dobrian.
78	5	"At the First Clear Word"	Melanie Mayron	Lizzy Weiss & Joy Gregory	February 3, 2015	1.24
After a night of intense partying, Bay wakes up in bed with Tank with no recollection of exactly what happened between them. She tries to piece the truth together, but realizes that the truth itself is debated despite it clearly being rape. Daphne is invited with four other women members of her chemistry class to Professor Marillo's house where she once again clashes with Vimla. Regina decorates Eric's cafe. Meanwhile, John, Kathryn, and Lily are worried about Toby's lack of life direction. Title reference: From the 1923 painting At the First Clear Word by Max Ernst.
79	6	"Black and Gray"	Ron Lagomarsino	Henry Robles & Darla Lansu	February 10, 2015	1.34
Bay's private actions at the party are exposed by Toby's girlfriend from something Toby told her in confidence. Because of this, everyone is telling Bay how to feel and it leads to an investigation by the university. Bay tries to tell Emmett but is too upset. Daphne flies out to talk to Emmett. Title reference: From the 1871 painting Arrangement in Grey and Black No. 1 by James McNeill Whistler.
80	7	"Fog and Storm and Rain"	Lea Thompson	William H. Brown	February 17, 2015	1.25
Bay is desperate to bridge the distance between her and Emmett since the incident with Tank, but Emmett refuses to talk about what happened. Her building frustration and his constant dismissal of the topic ultimately leads them to take a break. Kathryn's mother visits and brings a surprise guest. She reveals that she has been diagnosed with dementia, which Kathryn initially refuses to accept. Meanwhile, a huge storm has Regina and Daphne stuck at the coffeehouse with Eric and Nacho, who ends up blackmailing them. Title reference: From the 1996 painting Fog and Storm and Rain by Eyvind Earle.
81	8	"Art Like Love Is Dedication"	Jonathan Frakes	Linda Gase	February 24, 2015	0.95
Bay's community service run ends early when she saves her supervisor from choking. She wants to resume her art career and decides to make opportunities for herself. Travis is struggling in English, but is reluctant to take advice from Kathryn. Daphne is interested when Mingo asks her to spend some time together, but soon realizes that he only wants to be friends with benefits. Title reference: From the 1965 painting Art Like Love Is Dedication by Hans Hofmann.
82	9	"The Player's Choice"	David Paymer	Terrence Coli	March 3, 2015	0.96
To keep her mind off Emmett, who is avoiding her, Bay agrees to be a baseball assistant to John and also tries to help Travis and Mary Beth get over a rough patch in their relationship. Meanwhile, Daphne gets caught up in sorority rush when she decides that she needs to branch out. Also, Kathryn catches Lily getting close to one of her co-workers, which leads to Lily complicating things with Toby right after he asks her to move in with him. Title reference: From the painting The Player's Choice by Gaetano Bellei.
83	10	"There Is My Heart"	Norman Buckley	Lizzy Weiss & Bekah Brunstetter	March 10, 2015	1.06
Daphne finds out that she received a D in chemistry and starts to wonder if her dream of becoming a doctor is out of reach. A later incident with her friends at the hospital and a talk with Mingo change her mind. Regina accidentally tells Eric she loves him, only to have him tell her that he's considering selling the coffee shop. Toby gets mad at Kathryn for talking to Lily about her feelings, but must put everything aside to perform their "Batter Up" showcase for a Broadway reviewer. Meanwhile, Bay has flown in to surprise Emmett and put plans together for them in L.A., but finds out that a short film he pitched included personal details about their relationship and the incident with Tank. Emmett suggests that they break it off for a while so that he can focus on school, saying they've been heading in separate directions. Bay says if they go forward with a break-up, it'll be forever and they end up parting ways. Title reference: From the 1999 painting There Is My Heart by George Stefanescu.
84	11	"To Repel Ghosts"	Millicent Shelton	Lizzy Weiss	August 24, 2015	0.98
Bay is still grieving the end of her relationship with Emmett and finds it hard to move on when she sees him everywhere. Daphne realizes that her friends don't approve of Mingo. She also finds out that Lily is pregnant with Toby's baby and tries to get the two of them back on speaking terms, but to no avail. Meanwhile, John is told that the family might be in serious financial trouble. Title reference: From the 1986 painting To Repel Ghosts by Jean-Michel Basquiat.
85	12	"How Does a Girl Like You Get to Be a Girl Like You"	Zetna Fuentes	Bekah Brunstetter	August 31, 2015	0.87
Bay enrolls in a Spanish course at UMKC just as the sexual assault incident is brought back to light on campus. She becomes paranoid about rumors people are spreading about her, while Kathryn tries to save Melody's job by volunteering to talk with a parent who pulled their student out of the deaf program because of the incident. John is keeping the financial troubles a secret from the family, which might prove to be very costly as family expenses start piling up. Meanwhile, Toby and Lily consider their options on what to do about their situation and Toby doesn't appreciate Daphne's input. Title reference: From the 1991 painting How Does a Girl Like You Get to Be a Girl Like You? by Yinka Shonibare.
86	13	"Between Hope and Fear"	David Paymer	Lizzy Weiss & Dayna Lynne North	September 7, 2015	0.99
Toby tells the family about the baby. John is angry but Kathryn wants to be supportive, while Bay implores him to research all his options before making any decisions. She arranges for her and Toby to visit a special needs school. Eric asks Regina to move in with him, but before she says yes, she decides to take Daphne on a trip to Atlanta to discover what has become of his ex-wife, Hope Paxton. Meanwhile, Travis visits Emmett in L.A. and finds that Emmett has changed for the worse. Title reference: From the 1876 painting Between Hope and Fear by Lawrence Alma-Tadema.
87	14	"We Mourn, We Weep, We Love Again"	Ron Lagomarsino	Henry Robles & Alexander Georgakis	September 14, 2015	1.00
Bay has a hard time dealing with Regina moving out. Daphne goes on ambulance ride-alongs as a part of her training to become her dorm's safety captain, but a particular accident unexpectedly drags up memories from the night of Angelo's death. Meanwhile, John and Kathryn look to endorse products for some easy money, but find that their names don't hold as much value as they had originally thought. Title reference: From the 1995 mixed media on paper We Mourn, We Weep, We Love Again by Marjorie Strider.
88	15	"Instead of Damning the Darkness, It's Better to Light a Little Lantern"	Michael Lange	Linda Gase & Lizzy Weiss	September 21, 2015	0.70
Melody brings Daphne, Bay, and Travis with her to Mexico to help distribute hearing aids to deaf locals. Emmett unexpectedly shows up and when Bay learns that he has started seeing Skye, it sends her into a jealous fury. Daphne is touched by the work she's doing and sets out to go the extra mile to assist the community with the help of a fellow volunteer. Meanwhile, Melody's boyfriend Gabe proposes that they adopt a deaf child together. Title reference: From the painting Instead of Damning the Darkness, It's Better to Light a Little Lantern by Hassan Massoudy.
89	16	"Borrowing Your Enemy's Arrows"	D. W. Moffett	William H. Brown	September 28, 2015	0.76
Daphne invites Mingo and his parents to a Kennish family grill night. Things go awry when it's revealed that Mingo's father Larry is the business manager that John holds responsible for sending the family into financial ruin. Bay decides that it's time to move on and sets her eyes on Garrett, one of Travis' deaf friends. While out to dinner, Bay runs into Tank, who's been having a hard time since he got expelled. Title reference: From the 1998 sculpture Borrowing Your Enemy's Arrows by Cai Guo-Qiang.
90	17	"To the Victor Belong the Spoils"	Jay Karas	T.J. Brady and Rasheed Newson	October 5, 2015	0.79
Daphne seeks to raise $600 to help out the deaf community she served in Mexico and gets help from Mingo. Mingo has also been trying to overlook her kiss with Quinn, but it proves to be hard when he finds out that those two have been keeping in constant contact. Bay finds out that a boy on campus is using her "Hammer Girl" art to sell degrading t-shirts. Meanwhile, Toby and Lily have to decide whether to move to London to raise their baby with Lily's parents' help or to stay in Kansas City with the Kennishes. Also, Eric walks out on Regina after finding out that she had lied about visiting Hope. Title reference: From the 1901 painting To the Victor Belong the Spoils by Charles Marion Russell.
91	18	"The Accommodations of Desire"	Michael Grossman	Henry Robles & Dayna Lynne North	October 12, 2015	0.75
Bay thinks that she's ready to jump into the hookup game with Garrett, but quickly realizes that it's not for her. When he later approaches her about the Tank incident holding her back, she ends up confronting Travis for telling Garrett her secret. Daphne thinks that Josh has feelings for her after he tells her that his relationship problems with Vimla are because of feelings for someone else. Mingo offers to talk to Josh for her, but things take an awkward turn when it's revealed that Josh actually has a crush on him. Meanwhile, Eric tells John of a unique investment opportunity and Lily is stressed out over her impending motherhood. Also, Bay comes across a woman interested in an art commission, who unbeknownst to her is Hope Paxton. Title reference: From the 1929 painting The Accommodations of Desire by Salvador Dalí.
92	19	"A Mad Tea Party"	Carlos Gonzalez	Linda Gase	October 19, 2015	0.95
Regina is hosting a baby shower for Lily, but the duties fall onto Bay when Hope kidnaps Will and Regina and Eric are blackmailed. Bay gets mad when she finds out that everyone has been keeping secrets from her. Lily has some uncomfortable conversations with some of Kathryn's friends regarding her child's disability. Meanwhile, after Professor Marillo tells her that she won't make it as a doctor, Daphne digs deeper and helps a friend keep pursuing her potential as well. Bay ends up spilling Eric's secret to her parents. Title reference: From the 1969 color heliogravure on japon nacre paper A Mad Tea Party by Salvador Dalí.
93	20	"And Always Searching for Beauty"	Melanie Mayron	Lizzy Weiss & Bekah Brunstetter	October 26, 2015	0.83
Regina gets Eric and Hope to put aside their differences and co-parent Will, however, that means that he'll be relocating to Atlanta. Daphne tries to curb Mingo's jealousy when Quinn shows up to interview her for a summer program. Bay holds her first art show, but later finds out that Travis orchestrated the whole event. He admits that he's in love with her and they kiss. Afterwards, Emmett finds her for a heart-to-heart about the last year. Meanwhile, John and Kathryn are at odds over a car wash deal. Lily and Toby welcome their baby boy, Carlton. Daphne and Bay decide to travel to China together. Ten months later, the two girls are settled abroad when Bay gets a phone call about an emergency back home. Title reference: From the 2001 oil, acrylic, paper mache, herbs on linen abstract And Always Searching for Beauty by Joan Snyder.

== Reception ==
=== U.S. ratings ===
No.	Episode	Original air date	Timeslot (EST)	Viewers (million)	Adults 18–49 rating	Cable rank (18–49)		Note
No.	Episode	Original air date	Timeslot (EST)	Viewers (million)	Adults 18–49 rating	Timeslot	Night	Note
1	"And It Cannot Be Changed"	January 6, 2015	Tuesday 9:00 pm	1.29	0.6	10	27	
2	"Bracing the Waves"	January 13, 2015	Tuesday 9:00 pm	1.15	0.5	11	40	
3	"I Lock the Door Upon Myself"	January 20, 2015	Tuesday 9:00 pm	1.21	0.5	9	35	
4	"We Were So Close That Nothing Used to Stand Between Us"	January 27, 2015	Tuesday 9:00 pm	1.30	0.6	8	22	
5	"At First Clear Word"	February 3, 2015	Tuesday 9:00 pm					
6	"Black and Gray"	February 10, 2015	Tuesday 9:00 pm					
7	"Fog and Storm and Rain"	February 17, 2015	Tuesday 9:00 pm					
8	"Art Like Love Is Dedication"	February 24, 2015	Tuesday 9:00 pm					
9	"The Player's Choice"	March 3, 2015	Tuesday 9:00 pm					
10	"There Is My Heart"	March 10, 2015	Tuesday 9:00 pm					
11	"To Repel Ghosts"	August 24, 2015	Tuesday 9:00 pm					
12	"How Does a Girl Like You Get to Be a Girl Like You"	August 31, 2015	Tuesday 9:00 pm					
13	"Between Hope and Fear"	September 7, 2015	Tuesday 9:00 pm					
14	"We Mourn, We Weep, We Love Again"	September 14, 2015	Tuesday 9:00 pm					
15	"Instead of Damning the Darkness, It's Better to Light a Little Lantern"	September 21, 2015	Tuesday 9:00 pm					
16	"Borrowing Your Enemy's Arrows"	September 28, 2015	Tuesday 9:00 pm					
17	"To the Victor Belong the Spoils"	October 5, 2015	Tuesday 9:00 pm					
18	"The Accommodations of Desire"	October 12, 2015	Tuesday 9:00 pm					
19	"A Mad Tea Party"	October 19, 2015	Tuesday 9:00 pm					
20	"And Always Searching for Beauty"	October 26, 2015	Tuesday 9:00 pm					
