= Switched at Birth season 5 =

Switched at Birth
- Season 5
- Starring: Lucas Grabeel; Katie Leclerc; Vanessa Marano; Constance Marie; D. W. Moffett; Lea Thompson
- No. of episodes: 10

Release
- Original network: Freeform
- Original release: January 31 – April 11, 2017

Season chronology
- ← Previous; Season 4

Switched at Birth was renewed for a fifth season by Freeform in October 2015. In March 2016, it was confirmed that this ten-episode season would be its last. The fifth season premiered on January 31, 2017.

The one-hour scripted drama revolves around two young women who discover they were switched at birth and grew up in very different environments. While balancing school, jobs, and their unconventional family, the girls, along with their friends and family, experience Deaf culture, relationships, class differences, racism, audism, and other social issues.

== Cast ==
=== Main ===
- Lucas Grabeel as Toby Kennish
- Katie Leclerc as Daphne Vasquez-Kennish
- Vanessa Marano as Bay Kennish-Vasquez
- Constance Marie as Regina Vasquez
- D. W. Moffett as John Kennish
- Lea Thompson as Kathryn Kennish

=== Recurring ===
- Sean Berdy as Emmett Bledsoe
- Bianca Bethune as Sharee Gifford
- Marlee Matlin as Melody Bledsoe
- Ryan Lane as Travis Barnes
- Rachel Shenton as Lily Summers
- Adam Hagenbuch as Greg "Mingo" Shimingo
- Sharon Pierre-Louis as Iris Watkins
- Rana Roy as Vimla
- Alice Lee as Skye

== Episodes ==
No. overall	No. in season	Title	Directed by	Written by	Original release date	US viewers (millions)
94	1	"The Call"	Allan Arkush	Lizzy Weiss	January 31, 2017	0.60
Early in her trip to China with Daphne, Bay contracts a serious illness and spends weeks recovering. When she does, the summer is almost over and she has not seen much of the country so she convinces Daphne to stay the whole school year. Travis joins them, and begins a relationship with Bay. 10 months later, the three are called home when Emmett overdoses on a mix of medications. Bay, Daphne, and Travis decide to stay in Kansas City. Daphne is upset to learn how behind she is in her studies; she also learns Mingo has a new girlfriend and that there is no housing for her at the university. Regina allows Bay to stay in the empty apartment above the Cracked Mug with Travis, but Bay tells Travis she wants Daphne to move in with her instead. Regina attempts to end her relationship with her much younger secret boyfriend, Luca. Mingo invites Daphne to a karaoke costume party. His costume is of Lil Wayne and he takes a selfie with Daphne, causing outrage from some who view it as blackface. Title reference: Taken from the 1902 painting The Call by Paul Gauguin.
95	2	"This Has to Do with Me"	D. W. Moffett	William H. Brown & Liz Sczudlo	February 7, 2017	0.54
Title reference: Taken from the 1914 painting This Has To Do With Me by Francis Picabia.
96	3	"Surprise"	Stephen Tolkin	Terrence Coli & Colin Waite	February 14, 2017	0.52
Toby and Lily come for a visit with the baby. They are fighting because Lily misses work, while Toby is working too much and not helping with the baby. Toby reveals his gambling problem has returned. They decide to move back to the States. Lily gets her job back at the university, and Kathryn will help with the baby. When Bay tries to rekindle her friendship with Mary Beth, she is upset to learn Mary Beth is now dating Tank. Regina decides to go public about her relationship with Luca. John teases her about the age difference, but relents after she scolds him for applying a sexist double standard. Kathryn and Daphne are both supportive and happy for Regina. Daphne is having nightmares about Bay's illness in China and is then concerned about Bay's health and well-being when she is displaying some possible relapse symptoms relating to the illness. Luca recognizes it as PTSD. Luca accidentally spills the secret about Bay's illness to Regina and Bay and Daphne have to tell everyone about it. Title reference: Taken from the 1891 painting Surprised! by Henri Rousseau.
97	4	"Relation of Lines and Colors"	Carlos González	Linda Gase & J.R. Phillips	February 21, 2017	0.52
Title reference: Taken from the 1939 painting Relation of Lines and Colors by Georges Vantongerloo.
98	5	"Occupy Truth"	Jeff Byrd	Talicia Raggs & Lizzy Weiss	February 28, 2017	0.51
Title reference: Taken from the painting Occupy Truth by Miles Regis.
99	6	"Four Ages in Life"	Janice Cooke	Terrence Coli & Lenn K. Rosenfeld	March 7, 2017	0.44
Title reference: Taken from the 1902 painting Four Ages in Life by Edvard Munch.
100	7	"Memory (The Heart)"	Lea Thompson	Linda Gase	March 21, 2017	0.50
Title reference: Taken from the 1937 painting Memory (The Heart) by Frida Kahlo.
101	8	"Left in Charge"	Dawn Wilkinson	Liz Sczudlo	March 28, 2017	0.47
Title reference: Taken from the 1904 painting Left in Charge by Philip Eustace Stretton.
102	9	"The Wolf Is Waiting"	Jill D'Agnenica	Terrence Coli & William H. Brown	April 4, 2017	0.43
Bay meets the man who molested Travis when he was twelve: his uncle. She tries to make him tell his mother about what happened and reconnect. Chris tries to make Daphne cheat on his drug test so he won't get kicked out of the baseball team for using steroids. Regina finds out her coffeehouse is being robbed, so she put security cameras all over the place. She finds out the culprit is Eric, who has returned to get back a secret stash he hid in the coffeehouse so he and his son, Will, can start a new life. He asks her to come with him, but she refuses. Title reference: Taken from the 1914 painting The Wolf is Waiting by Kay Nielsen.
103	10	"Long Live Love"	Steve Miner	Lizzy Weiss & Linda Gase	April 11, 2017	0.49
Title reference: Taken from the 1923 painting Long Live Love by Max Ernst.

== Reception ==
=== U.S. ratings ===
No.	Episode	Original air date	Timeslot (EST)	Viewers (million)	Adults 18–49 rating	Cable rank (18–49)		Note
No.	Episode	Original air date	Timeslot (EST)	Viewers (million)	Adults 18–49 rating	Timeslot	Night	Note
1	"The Call"	January 31, 2017	Tuesday 9:00 pm	0.60				
2	"This Has to Do with Me"	February 7, 2017	Tuesday 9:00 pm					
3	"Surprise"	February 14, 2017	Tuesday 9:00 pm					
4	"Relation of Lines and Colors"	February 21, 2017	Tuesday 9:00 pm					
5	"Occupy Truth"	February 28, 2017	Tuesday 9:00 pm					
6	"Four Ages in Life"	March 7, 2017	Tuesday 9:00 pm					
7	"Memory (The Heart)"	March 21, 2017	Tuesday 9:00 pm					
8	"Left in Charge"	March 28, 2017	Tuesday 9:00 pm					
9	"The Wolf Is Waiting"	April 4, 2017	Tuesday 9:00 pm					
10	"Long Live Love"	April 11, 2017	Tuesday 9:00 pm					
