= Kennish =

Kennish is a surname of Manx origin. People with the surname include:

- John Kennish (1857–1921), American lawyer, politician, and judge
- Michael J. Kennish (fl. 1970s–2010s), American marine scientist and a research professor
- William Kennish (1799–1862), English engineer, inventor, explorer, scientist, and poet
- Bay Kennish, fictional character from the TV series Switched at Birth
