= Bondage (2006 film) =

- Directed by: Eric Allen Bell
- Written by: Eric Allen Bell
- Produced by: Eric Allen Bell; Braxton Pope; Andrew Weiner
- Cinematography: David Bridges
- Edited by: Tony Ciccone
- Music by: Mateo Messina
- Release date: March 2006 (SXSW)
- Country: United States
- Language: English

Bondage is a 2006 drama film written and directed by Eric Allen Bell, his feature film debut. The film was selected to premiere at the 2006 South by Southwest Film Festival.

== Premise ==
Bondage is the story of a youth from Orange County, California, who escapes an abusive home environment but ends up in juvenile detention and a psychiatric center.

== Cast ==
- Michael Angarano as Charlie
- Illeana Douglas as Elaine Edwards
- Griffin Dunne as Dr. Simon
- Sean Berdy as Young Trey
- Eric Lange as Bob Edwards
- Evan Ellingson as Mark Edwards
- Mae Whitman as Angelica
- Andy Dick as Stewart
- Rocky Marquette as Richard
- Michael K. Williams as Willie
- Ezra Buzzington as Fred
- Robert Zepeda as Reyes
- Jose Pablo Cantillo as Spider
- Kevin Derkash as Vincent
- Shant Marashlian as Hamid
- Paul Peglar as Dennis
- Wes Robinson as Mike Lozano
- Sam Upton as Max
- Shane Baumel as Young Charlie
