= Eric Allen Bell =

American filmmaker

Eric Allen Bell (born August 27, 1973) is a documentary film writer and director. His work includes Bondage (2006), and he has worked with Michael Moore. In 2012, he received significant media coverage for his views on Islam. He was involved in a dispute over the Islamic Center of Murfreesboro in Murfreesboro, Tennessee. He initially supported the mosque, but then became critical of Islam. He was a contributor to the Daily Kos, but after a series of posts critical of Islam, he was banned from the website. He then became a self-styled counter-jihad activist, and in 2012 he claimed to have received a wave of death threats as he was mistakenly thought to have made the trailer for Innocence of Muslims. He stated that "Four Pakistani newspapers have accused me of being the filmmaker and called for my death," and that "I have been moved to a number of safe houses. I cannot go outside and I have been advised not to stand near windows."
