= This Game's Called Murder =

- Directed by: Adam Sherman
- Written by: Adam Sherman
- Produced by: Adam Sherman; Hagai Shaham; Paul Laurens
- Starring: Vanessa Marano; James Lastovic; Natasha Henstridge; Ron Perlman
- Distributed by: Cranked Up Films
- Release date: December 3, 2021
- Running time: 106 minutes
- Country: United States
- Language: English

This Game's Called Murder is a 2021 American thriller comedy film written and directed by Adam Sherman and starring Vanessa Marano, James Lastovic, Natasha Henstridge and Ron Perlman.

== Cast ==
- Ron Perlman as Mr. Wallendorf
- Vanessa Marano as Jennifer Wallendorf
- Natasha Henstridge as Mrs. Wallendorf
- James Lastovic as Cane
- Judson Mills as Chad
- Tyler Steelman as Stew
- Annabel Barrett as Cynthia
- Tory Devon Smith as Rick
- Nicole Sousa as Audrey
- Nikko Austen Smith as Winona

== Release ==
The film was released in theaters and on VOD on December 3, 2021.

== Reception ==
Sabina Dana Plasse of Film Threat rated the film a 7 out of 10.
