= Michael J. Kennish =

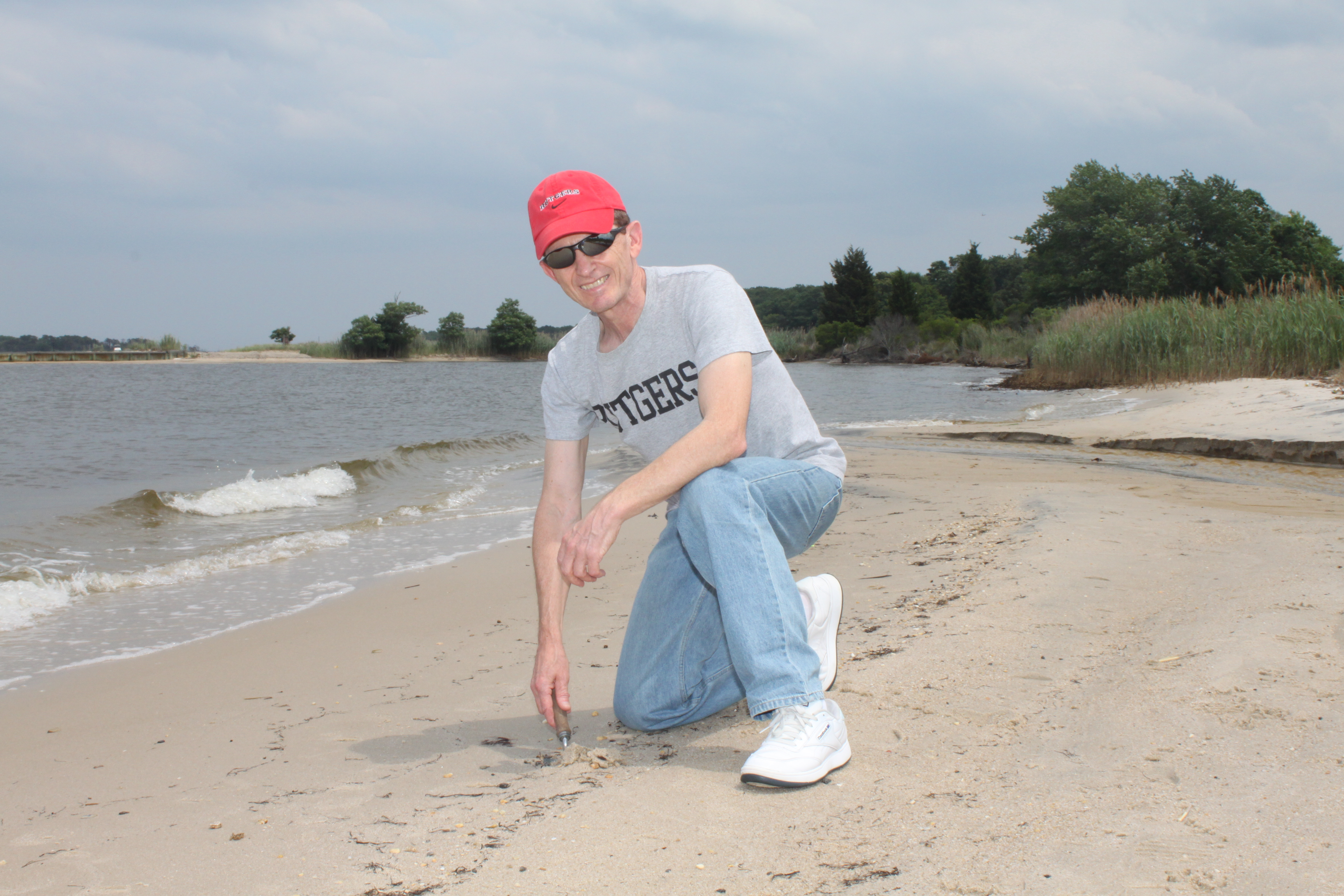
Dr. Michael J. Kennish

Michael J. Kennish is an American marine scientist and a research professor in the Institute of Marine and Coastal Sciences at Rutgers University in New Brunswick, New Jersey. He is best known for his work on the effects of human activities on estuarine and marine environments.

== Education ==
- Rutgers University, B.A. geology, 1972
- Rutgers University, M.S. geology, 1974
- Rutgers University, Ph.D. geology, 1977

== Research ==
Kennish has conducted biological and geological research on estuarine, coastal ocean, and deep-sea environments for more than 30 years. Much of this research has involved the development and application of innovative methods to determine the condition and health of coastal ecosystems. He has served on environmental panels and workgroups assessing these problems in New Jersey, the mid-Atlantic region, and nationwide, while concomitantly collaborating extensively with state and federal government agencies to remediate degraded habitats.

Most notably, Kennish has been heavily engaged in integrative ecosystem assessment, particularly investigations of the impairment and remediation of impacted estuarine and coastal marine waters. These include studies of the natural and anthropogenic stressors that effect change in coastal ecosystems, and the dynamics of environmental forcing factors that generate imbalances in biotic community structure and ecosystem function.

Kennish' research is multidisciplinary in scope, addressing a wide range of nationally significant problems. These include the effects of watershed development on coastal bays and near-shore ocean waters, wastewater discharges, habitat loss and alteration of aquatic systems, nutrient enrichment and eutrophication, hypoxia and anoxia, organic pollution, chemical contaminants, climate change, sea-level rise, overfishing, invasive species, watercraft effects, dredging and dredged material disposal, freshwater diversions, calefaction of estuarine waters, and entrainment and impingement of electric generating stations. He has also examined the effects of construction and operation of industrial facilities, maintenance of shorelines and waterways, and human use of coastal space and aquatic systems.

As the co-chair of the Coastal Climate Change Group in the Climate and Environmental Change Initiative, Kennish is heavily involved in the study of long-term climate change impacts on the New Jersey coast.

== Awards ==
- Paerle S. Schwartz Environmental Award, League of Women Voters, Lifetime Achievement for Estuarine and Marine Research and Public Outreach, 2011
- New Jersey Sierra Club Outstanding Achievement Award for Research, Education, and Outreach, 2010
- Graham Macmillan Award (National Award of the American Littoral Society) for Marine Science and Conservation, 2010
- NOAA/NERRA National Award for Outstanding Contributions to the National Estuarine Research Reserve System, 2009
- Guardian of the Barnegat Bay Award (USEPA/Barnegat Bay National Estuary Program), 2008

== Publications ==
Kennish is the author or editor of 13 scholarly books in marine science, and he is the author or co-author of more than 160 research articles in science journals and books. In addition, he has edited 6 compendium science journal special issues on various topics in marine science.

== Books authored ==
- Kennish, M. J. (1998). Pollution Impacts on Marine Biotic Communities. CRC Press, Boca Raton, Florida. ISBN 9780849384288.
- Kennish, M. J. (1992). Ecology of Estuaries: Anthropogenic Effects. CRC Press, Boca Raton, Florida. ISBN 9780849380419.
- Kennish, M. J. (1990). Ecology of Estuaries, Vol. II: Biological Aspects. CRC Press, Boca Raton, Florida.
- Kennish, M. J. (1986). Ecology of Estuaries, Vol. I: Physical and Chemical Aspects. CRC Press, Boca Raton, Florida.
