= Jill Remez =

American actress

- Born: Los Angeles, California
- Occupations: Film, television actress

Jill Remez is an American actress known for her acting work in several films and television programs as well as her skill at puppetry, having been one of the puppeteers behind Miss Piggy for The Jim Henson Company. She portrayed Juanita Vasquez on the television soap opera Passions.
