= D. W. Moffett =

American actor (born 1954)

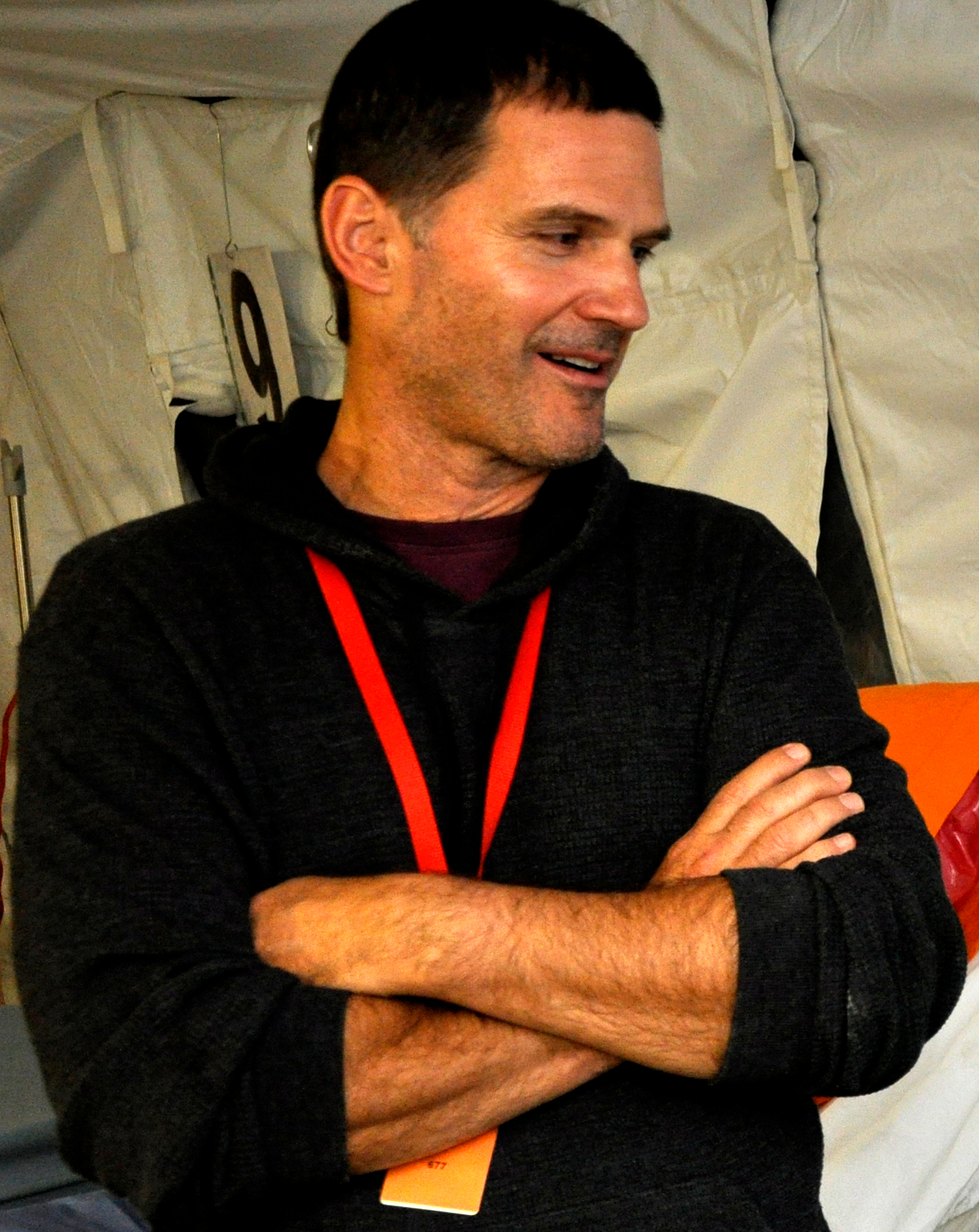
- Moffett in Afghanistan, 2009
- Born: Donald Warren Moffett; October 26, 1954 (age 72); Highland Park, Illinois, U.S.
- Education: Stanford University
- Occupation: Actor
- Years active: 1984–present
- Spouse: Kristal Rogers (m. 1997)

Donald Warren Moffett (born October 26, 1954) is an American actor. He began his career in stage productions in Chicago before starring in the original New York City production of Larry Kramer's The Normal Heart in 1985. He subsequently starred in a Broadway production of The Boys of Winter the same year. He made his feature film debut in Bob Rafelson's thriller Black Widow (1987) before portraying a serial killer in the thriller Lisa (1990).

Moffett had a supporting role in Bernardo Bertolucci's drama Stealing Beauty (1996), and went on to star in the network series For Your Love (1998–2002). Other film credits from this time include Steven Soderbergh's Traffic (2000), which earned Moffett a Screen Actors Guild Award for Outstanding Performance by a Cast in a Motion Picture, and the coming-of-age drama Thirteen (2003).

Beginning in 2008, Moffett had a recurring role on the NBC drama series Friday Night Lights, appearing in two seasons. From 2011 to 2017, he starred as John Kennish on the ABC Family series Switched at Birth.

== Early life and education ==
Moffett was born in Highland Park, Illinois, and raised in nearby Wilmette. From 1969 to 1974, Moffett attended a private secondary school in Germany, and became fluent in German.

After attending Stanford University, where he majored in international relations, Moffett returned to Chicago and began working as an investment banker. Moffett was unhappy with this career, and later reflected: "About halfway through my tenure at the bank, it became hellishly evident that going to a bar near the Board of Trade building to have double gimlets with secretaries was not my idea of life." At the suggestion of a friend, Moffett enrolled in an acting class at the St. Nicholas Theater Company, where he began studying with William H. Macy. Shortly thereafter, he started his own theater company, Remains Theater.

== Career ==
=== 1984–1999 ===
After appearing in numerous stage productions in Chicago, Moffett starred opposite John Malkovich in a New York City stage production of Balm In Gilead. He took the stage name of "D. W." to avoid confusion with British actor Donald Moffat. In 1984, he appeared in a Broadway production of The Real Thing. He then starred opposite Brad Davis in the original stage production of Larry Kramer's The Normal Heart in 1985, playing a gay man dying of AIDS, for which he won critical acclaim. The same year, he played opposite Matt Dillon in a Broadway production of The Boys of Winter. He also starred opposite Aidan Quinn and Gena Rowlands in the television film An Early Frost, which also dealt with two male lovers during the HIV/AIDS crisis.

In 1987, Moffett made his feature film debut in Bob Rafelson's thriller Black Widow. He subsequently starred in the thriller film Lisa (1990), playing a serial killer whom a teenage girl becomes enamored with, unaware he is a dangerous predator. The same year, he had a supporting part in the psychological horror film Pacific Heights. He also starred in NBC's made-for-television film adaptation of Danielle Steel's novel Fine Things (also 1990), alongside Tracy Pollan.

Moffett subsequently starred opposite Liv Tyler, Jeremy Irons, and Rachel Weisz in Bernardo Bertolucci's Stealing Beauty (1996), and in 1999, had a supporting role in the drama film Molly, starring Elisabeth Shue. Beginning in 1998, Moffett was a main cast member on the NBC (and later, WB) sitcom For Your Love, which aired until 2002.

=== 2000–present ===
In 2000, Moffett appeared in an ensemble cast in Steven Soderbergh's crime thriller Traffic (2000), which earned him a Screen Actors Guild Award for Outstanding Performance by a Cast in a Motion Picture. He later had a small role in the drama Thirteen (2003), playing the absent father of a troubled teenage girl (played by Evan Rachel Wood), and subsequently co-starred in the thriller Twisted (2004), portraying the attorney of a serial killer.

In 2005, Moffett performed at the Old Vic theater in London, playing opposite Kevin Spacey in The Philadelphia Story.

He played Bob Hardy in the series Hidden Palms for the CW Network and starred in the 2007 CW series Life Is Wild as Dr. Danny Clarke. Between 2008 and 2010, he co-starred in the NBC drama series Friday Night Lights. From 2011 to 2012, Moffett starred in the comedy series Happily Divorced as Elliot, an on/off love interest of the main character played by Fran Drescher. He also starred as John Kennish: Bay's and Toby's father and Daphne's biological father, in the ABC Family series Switched at Birth, which ran from 2011 until 2017.

In 2017, Moffett was named chair of the film and television program at the Savannah College of Art and Design.

== Filmography ==
=== Film ===
Year	Title	Role	Notes
1987	Black Widow	Michael	
1987	The Misfit Brigade	Capt. Von Barring	
1989	Lisa	Richard	
1990	Pacific Heights	Bill	
1992	Miss Beatty's Children	Alan Chandler	
1993	Falling Down	Det. Lydecker	
1995	Rough Magic	Cliff Wyatt	
1996	The Little Death	Paul Hannon	
1996	Stealing Beauty	Richard	
1996	Joe's Wedding	Joe McCarthy	
1999	Molly	Mark Cottrell	
2000	Traffic	Jeff Sheridan	
2001	Kill Me Later	Mathew Richmond	
2003	Thirteen	Travis Freeland	
2004	Twisted	Ray Porter	
2005	Special Ed	Sonny	
2005	Tennis, Anyone...?	Courtney Conte	
2008	Visioneers	Jeffers	
2008	bgFATLdy	Jack Wagner	
2009	The Smell of Success	Agent Chestnut	
2010	Skateland	Steakhouse Manager	
2011	The Sitter	Dr. Pedulla	
2011	Picture Paris	Randy Larson	Short film
2014	Dragon Nest: Warriors' Dawn	Velskud	Voice
2018	The Year of Spectacular Men	Teacher	
2023	May December	Tom Atherton	
2025	Alarum	Director Burbridge	
2025	One Battle After Another	Bill Desmond	

=== Television ===
Year	Title	Role	Notes
1985	An Early Frost	Peter Hilton	TV movie
1986	The Equalizer	Mitchell	Episode: "No Conscience"
1986	As the World Turns	Dr. Peter Chapin	TV series
1986	Miami Vice	Thomas Waldman	Episode: "Forgive Us Our Debts"
1987–1988	The Oldest Rookie	Det. Tony Jonas	8 episodes
1988	Tales from the Hollywood Hills: Closed Set	Cliff Harriston	TV movie
1989	Dream Breakers	Mark O'Connor	TV movie
1989	American Playhouse	James Rodker	Episode: "Ask Me Again"
1989	Midnight Caller	Robin Brigade / The Iceman	Episode: "Evil Is Live Spelled Backward: Parts 1 & 2"
1990	Tales from the Crypt	Logan Andrews	Episode: "'Til Death"
1990	Fine Things	Bernard Stephen 'Bernie' Fine	TV movie
1990	Lifestories	Steve Burdick	Episode: "Steve Burdick"
1991	Palace Guard	Tommy Logan	8 episodes
1992	In the Deep Woods	Frank McCarry	TV movie
1993	Lies and Lullabies	Gabriel	TV movie
1994	The Counterfeit Contessa	Dawson Everett	TV movie
1994	A Passion for Justice: The Hazel Smith Story	Smitty	TV movie
1994	Star Struck	Colton	TV movie
1995	The Outer Limits	James Heatherton	Episode: "Second Soul"
1995	The Naked Truth	Dylan Michael Michaels	Episode: "Comet Nails Star and Vice Versa!"
1996	The Secret She Carried	Mitch Hayward	TV movie
1997	Fired Up	James Collins	Episode: "A Concurrent Affair"
1997	Chicago Sons	Mike Kulchak	13 episodes
1998	Union Square	Tom	Episode: "What Are Friends For?"
1998	Perfect Prey	Det. Jimmy Cerullo	TV movie
1998–2002	For Your Love	Dean Winston	84 episodes
1999	A Song from the Heart	Gregory Pavan	TV movie
2001–2002	Crossing Jordan	Det. Eddy Winslow	4 episodes
2003	CSI: Miami	Dr. James Welmont	Episode: "Bunk"
2003	An Unexpected Love	Jack Mayer	TV movie
2003	Watching Ellie	Billy	Episode: "Date"
2003	Cold Case	Todd Whitley	Episode: "Look Again"
2003	Without a Trace	Alan Hodges	Episode: "Coming Home"
2003–2004	Skin	Skip Ziti	6 episodes
2004	The Deerings	Jack Denny	TV movie
2004	Nip/Tuck	Kevin Hotchkiss	2 episodes
2005	Riding the Bus with My Sister	Rick	TV movie
2005	Wild Card	Miles Jacobs	Episode: "Multiple Personality Fatality"
2005	Commander in Chief	Mike Stanton	Episode: "The Mom Who Came to Dinner"
2006	The Book of Daniel	Worth Webster	4 episodes
2006	Close to Home	Joseph Wright	2 episodes
2007	Law & Order: Criminal Intent	Grant Harrington	Episode: "Privilege"
2007	Brothers & Sisters	Michael Pellington	Episode: "Valentine's Day Massacre"
2007	Numb3rs	Bob Tombrello	Episode: "Pandora's Box"
2007	Ghost Whisperer	Dale	Episode: "Delia's First Ghost"
2007	Grey's Anatomy	Allan	Episode: "The Other Side of This Life: Part 1"
2007	Hidden Palms	Bob Hardy	8 episodes
2007–2008	Life Is Wild	Danny Clark	13 episodes
2008–2010	Friday Night Lights	Joe McCoy	20 episodes
2009	Operating Instructions	Brandon Zisk	TV pilot
2009	Lie to Me	Dr. Jeffrey Buchanan	Episode: "The Best Policy"
2010	Law & Order: Special Victims Unit	Paul Olsen	Episode: "Shattered"
2010–2014	Hot in Cleveland	Chester	2 episodes
2010	The Closer	Jeffrey Walters	Episode: "Help Wanted"
2010	Covert Affairs	Sen. Jarvis	Episode: "Houses of the Holy"
2011	In Plain Sight	Julian Conrad	Episode: "Second Crime Around"
2011–2012	Happily Divorced	Elliot	11 episodes
2011–2017	Switched at Birth	John Kennish	Main role, 103 episodes
2013	Criminal Minds	James Blake	Episode: "#6"
2015–2019	Chicago Med	Cornelius Rhodes	16 episodes
2017	How to Get Away with Murder	Jeff Walsh	4 episodes

=== Theatre ===
Year	Title	Role	Notes
1984	The Real Thing	Billy	Replacement
1985	The Normal Heart	Felix Turner	
1985	The Boys of Winter	Bonney	
1989	Speed-the-Plow		
2001–2002	Contact	Michael Wiley	Replacement
2005	The Philadelphia Story	Mike Connor	
2009	Genesis Angels: The Saga of Lew Welch and the Beat Generation		
