= Sean Berdy =

American actor

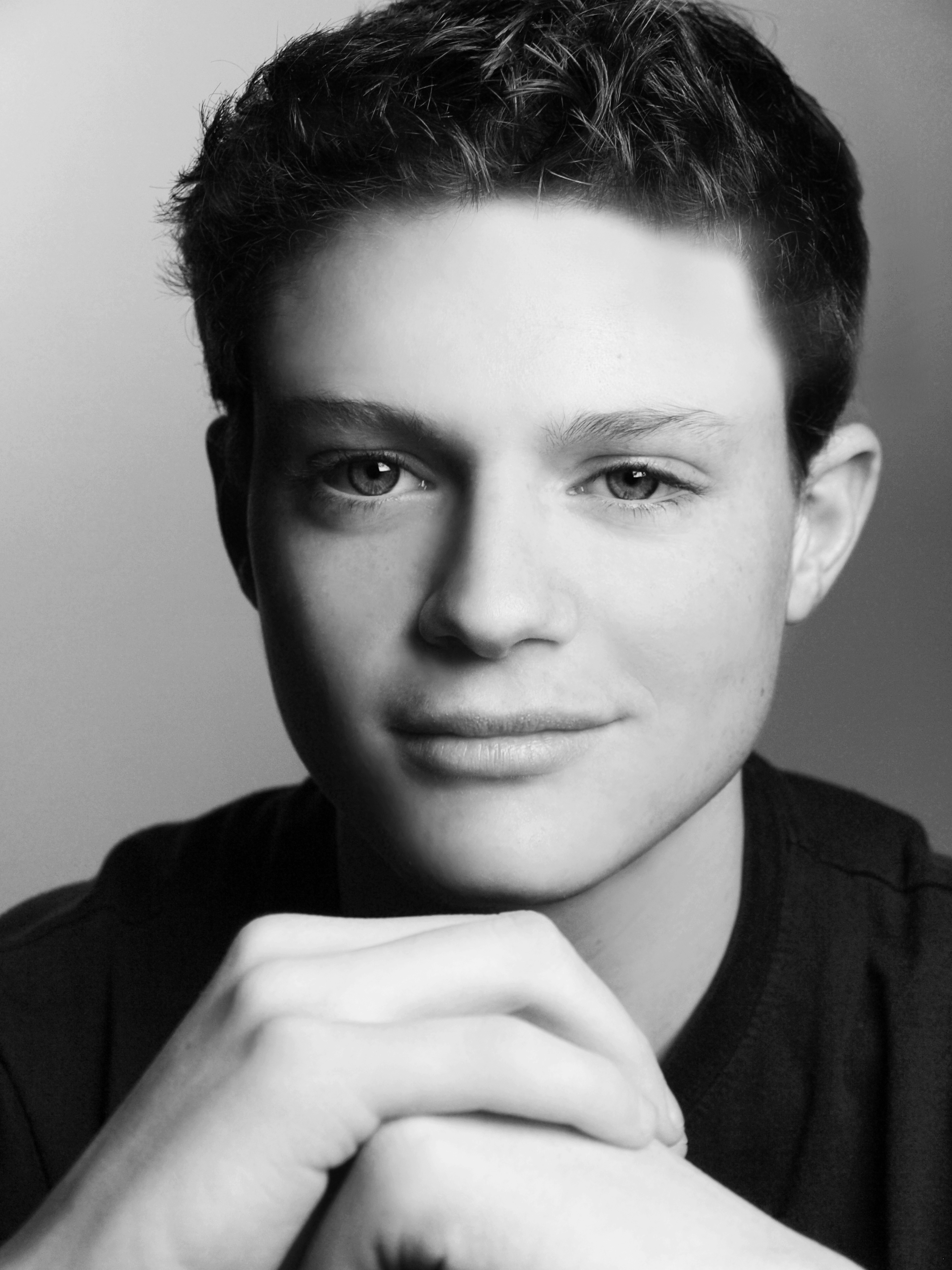
- Berdy in 2010
- Born: Sean Lance Berdy; June 3, 1993 (age 33); Boca Raton, Florida, U.S.
- Occupations: Actor, comedian
- Years active: 2005–2019
- Website: berdy.com

Sean Lance Berdy (born June 3, 1993) is an American actor. He began his career as a child in the film sequel The Sandlot 2 and is known for his roles in the television series The Society and Switched at Birth.

== Life ==
Berdy, a native of Boca Raton, Florida, was born deaf. He is bilingual; his first language is American Sign Language (ASL) and he speaks English. As a child, Berdy was interested in magic. He won the young magicians top award at the World Magicians Festival in Saint Petersburg. His formal acting career began in 2005 with his appearance in The Sandlot 2. He subsequently had roles in Bondage, The Deaf Family, and The Legend of the Mountain Man. Berdy was featured in several public service commercials.

Berdy relocated to California in 2011 for his role in Switched at Birth in which, he starred as Emmett Bledsoe, son of Melody Bledsoe, played by Marlee Matlin. He was nominated for the 2011 Teen Choice Awards under the TV category for breakout star. He completed high school remotely while filming. Berdy provided the on-camera ASL dubbing of Ice Age: Continental Drift.

In 2018 he took an acting hiatus due to struggling with bipolar disorder for many years. In 2019, he starred as Sam Eliot, in the Netflix show The Society.

In May 2019, Berdy reported that he was writing a movie about a love story featuring ASL.

== Filmography ==
Film and television
Year	Title	Role	Notes
2005	The Sandlot 2	Sammy "Fingers" Samuelson	
2006	The Bondage	Young Trey	
2008	The Legend of the Mountain Man	Nick	
2008	The Deaf Family	Wesley	
2011–2017	Switched at Birth	Emmett Bledsoe	Main role
2018	Drunk History	Frank Bowe	Episode: "Civil Rights"
2019	The Society	Sam Eliot	Main role
