= Constance Marie =

American actress

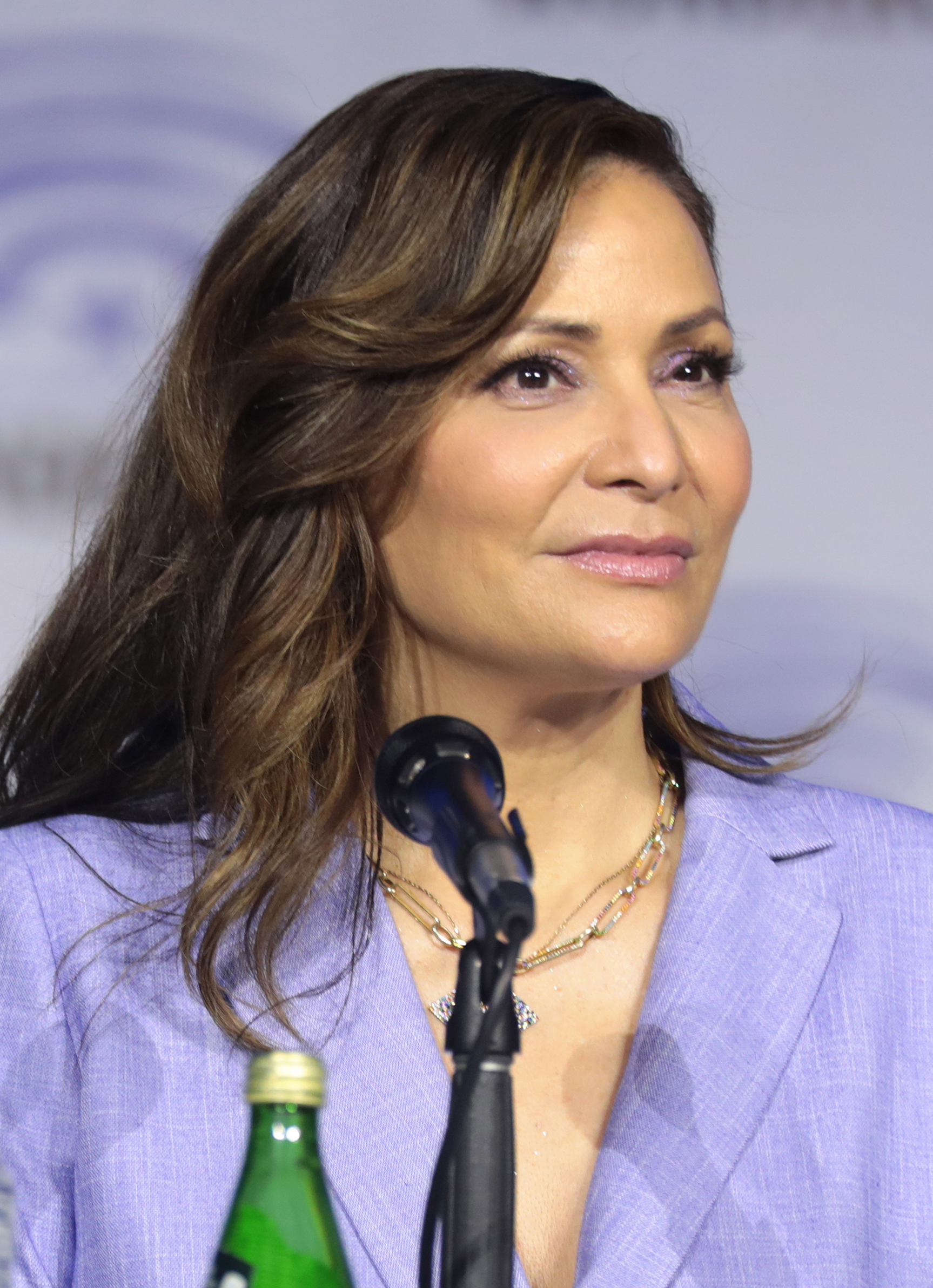
- Marie at the 2022 WonderCon
- Occupations: Actress, dancer
- Years active: 1982–present
- Children: 1

Constance Marie is an American actress. She is best known for her roles as Angelina "Angie" Lopez in George Lopez (2002–2007), and Marcela Quintanilla (mother of Selena) in the film Selena (1997). She portrayed Regina Vasquez in the ABC Family/Freeform drama series Switched at Birth (2011–2017). She also portrayed Camila Diaz in the Amazon Prime Video drama series Undone (2019–2022).

== Early life ==
Constance Marie Lopez was born in Los Angeles, California. A third-generation Mexican American, she was raised by her mother and grandmother in Los Angeles.

Marie developed an interest in dance during her youth. At age 19, she traveled to Japan to perform in Cosmopolis, a musical production by Japanese composer Ryuichi Sakamoto. Her early dance experience included street-dancing styles such as locking and popping, which she learned outside of formal dance training.

After returning to Los Angeles, Marie was spotted dancing at a nightclub by Toni Basil, who invited her to audition for David Bowie's Glass Spider Tour. She was selected as one of the tour's dancers in 1987. Marie later appeared in the 1988 concert video Glass Spider, which documented performances from the tour.

== Career ==
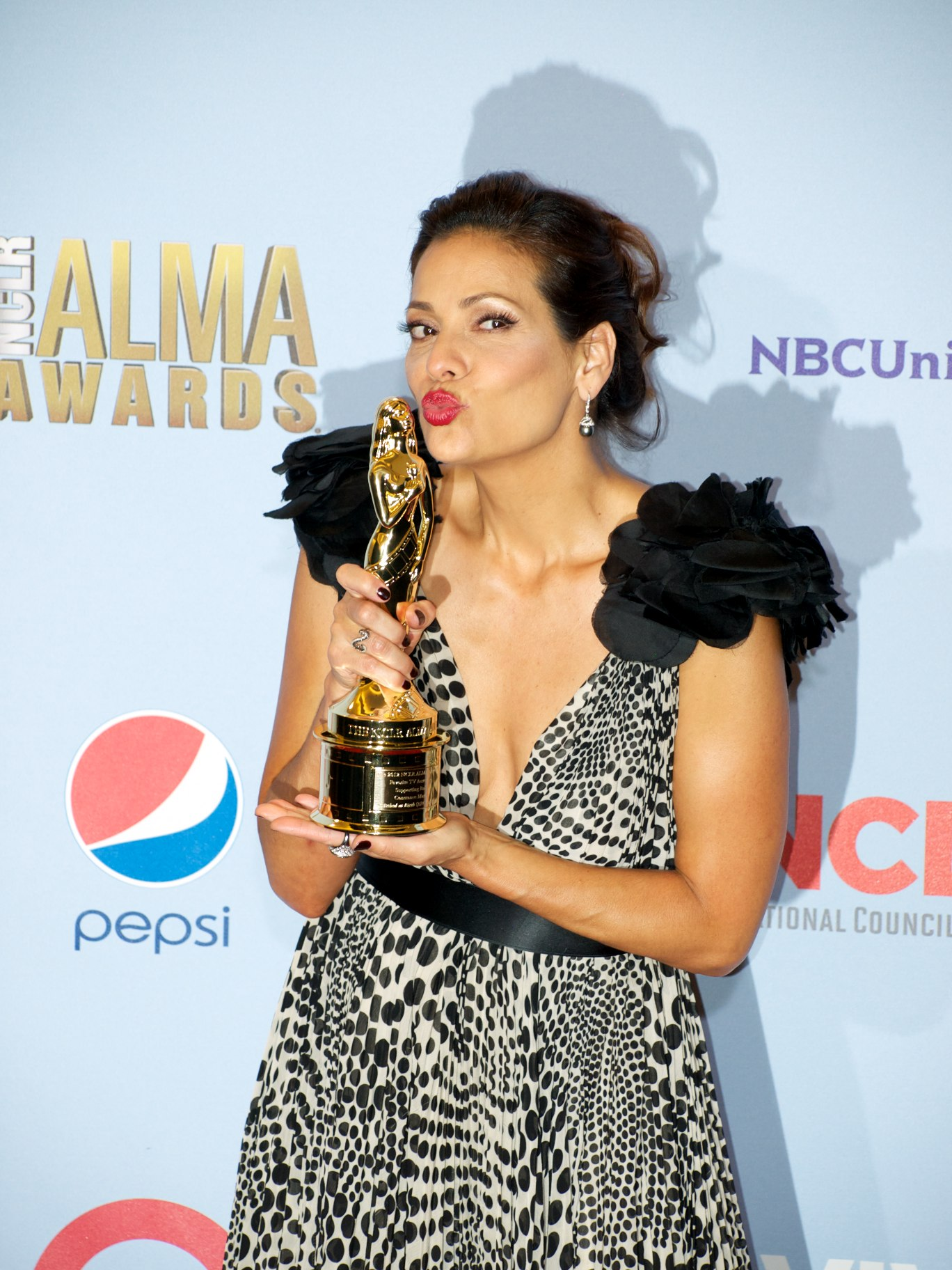
Marie with her award at the 2012 ALMA Awards

Marie began her acting career in the 1980s, appearing in the 1988 film Salsa and the television series Dirty Dancing. She subsequently appeared in the soap opera Santa Barbara and had roles in several television series, including Early Edition, Spin City, Union Square, and Ally McBeal. In 1997, she portrayed Marcela Quintanilla, the mother of singer Selena, in the biographical film Selena.

In 2001, Marie appeared in the comedy-drama film Tortilla Soup, alongside Héctor Elizondo, Jacqueline Obradors, and Elizabeth Peña. She also portrayed Nina Gonzalez in the PBS drama series American Family.

From 2002 to 2007, Marie portrayed Angelina "Angie" Lopez, the wife of George Lopez, in the ABC sitcom George Lopez. The series ran for six seasons. In 2004, Marie received an Imagen Award for Best Actress in Television Comedy for her performance.

In 2007, she appeared in an advertisement for People for the Ethical Treatment of Animals (PETA), encouraging pet owners to spay and neuter their animals.

From 2011 to 2017, Marie starred as Regina Vasquez in the ABC Family/Freeform drama series Switched at Birth. Her performance earned her a Gracie Award in 2012 for Outstanding Female Actor in a Supporting Role in a Drama Series or Special. She also received the 2012 ALMA Award for Favorite TV Actress in a Supporting Role.

Marie later appeared in the television series Angel from Hell, Animal Kingdom, and Law & Order True Crime, portraying Marta Cano in the latter's 2017 miniseries about the Menendez brothers. From 2016 to 2020, she voiced Doña Paloma in the Disney animated series Elena of Avalor.

From 2019 to 2022, Marie portrayed Camila Diaz in the Amazon Prime Video animated series Undone. She also had a recurring role as Dr. Corts in the Netflix comedy series Alexa & Katie.

From 2021 to 2023, Marie portrayed Beatriz Diaz in the Amazon Prime Video romantic comedy series With Love, created by Gloria Calderón Kellett. In a 2023 interview with the Los Angeles Times, Marie discussed her role in the series and her experiences portraying mothers in film and television.

Marie subsequently appeared in the television series Lopez vs Lopez (2022), How I Met Your Father (2023), and Doctor Odyssey (2024). In 2025, she portrayed Vanessa, the mother of private investigator Julie, in the second season of the Netflix comedy series A Man on the Inside.

== Personal life ==
Marie has a daughter, Luna Marie, born in 2009. Marie has been a vegetarian since her teenage years and has raised her daughter as a vegetarian.

== Filmography ==
=== Film ===
Year	Title	Role	Notes
1988	Glass Spider	Featured Dancer	
1988	Salsa	Featured Dancer	
1993	12:01	Joan Zevo	TV movie
1994	Island City	Connie Sealle	TV movie
1995	My Family	Toni	
1997	Selena	Marcella Quintanilla	
1999	The Last Marshal	Rosa	
2000	Dancing in September	Teresa Lopez	TV movie
2001	See Spot Run	The Neighbor	
2001	Tortilla Soup	Yolanda	
2006	Puff, Puff, Pass	Montana	
2010	Class	Victoria Corrales	TV movie
2011	Puss in Boots	Imelda (voice)	
2014	Sweet Surrender	Sandra	TV movie
2015	The Right Girl	Dee Walker	TV movie
2020	Winter in Vail	Trish Simmons	TV movie
2022	Mr. Right	Gloria	Short

=== Television ===
Year	Title	Role	Notes
1988–1989	Dirty Dancing	Penny Rivera	Main Cast
1989–1990	Santa Barbara	Nikki Alvarez	Main Cast
1991	The Man in the Family	Jenny	Episode: "None for Sal"
1991	Jake and the Fatman	Bianca Alamán	Episode: "Where or When Part: 1 & 2"
1992	Reasonable Doubts	Officer Petra Delgado	Episode: "Fish out of Water"
1992	The Hat Squad	Jo Jo Wilson	Episode: "The Widow Marker"
1993	Cobra	Maria	Episode: "Nowhere to Run"
1996	The Sentinel	Beverley Sanchez	Episode: "Killers"
1997	Spin City	Gabby Sanchez	Episode: "Gabby's Song"
1997–1998	Union Square	Gabriella Diaz	Main Cast
1998–2000	Early Edition	Police Detective Toni Brigatti	Recurring Cast: Season 3–4
1999	Two Guys and a Girl	Venita	Recurring Cast: Season 2
2000–2001	For Your Love	Samantha	Recurring Cast: Season 4
2001	Ally McBeal	Inez Cortez	Episode: "Hats Off to Larry"
2001	That '70s Show	Little Drummer Boy (voice)	Episode: "An Eric Forman Christmas"
2002	I Love the '80s	Herself	Recurring Guest
2002	American Family	Nina Gonzalez	Recurring Cast: Season 1
2002–2007	George Lopez	Angelina "Angie" Lopez	Main Cast
2003	I Love the '70s	Herself	Episode: "1973"
2003	Intimate Portrait	Herself	Episode: "Constance Marie"
2005	Unscripted	Herself	Episode: "Episode #1.1"
2005	TV Land's Top Ten	Herself	Recurring Guest
2005	Punk'd	Herself	Episode: "Episode #5.2"
2005	The Drop	Herself	Episode: "Episode #3.16"
2006	In the Mix	Herself	Episode: "Pursuing Happiness"
2008	CSI: Crime Scene Investigation	Det. Carolina Flores	Episode: "Two and a Half Deaths"
2009	The Secret Life of the American Teenager	Virginia Molina	Episode: "Whoomp! (There It Is)"
2009	According to Jim	Victoria	Episode: "The Ego Boost"
2011	The Traveler's Guide to Life	Herself	Recurring Cast
2011–2017	Switched at Birth	Regina Vasquez	Main Cast
2014	American Dad!	Catalina (voice)	Episode: "Blagsnarst, a Love Story"
2014–2015	Celebrity Name Game	Herself	Episode: “Mel B. & Constance Marie #1-#3”
2016	Angel from Hell	Linda	Recurring Cast
2016–2020	Elena of Avalor	Doña Paloma (voice)	Recurring Cast: Season 1–3
2017	Celebrity Family Feud	Herself	Episode: "Episode #4.2"
2017	Lopez	Herself	Episode: "George Dates His Daughter"
2017	Law & Order True Crime	Marta Cano	Recurring Cast
2018	Overthinking with Kat & June	Lucinda Renoir Souza	Episode: "Eggshell"
2019	The Fix	Mayor Stephanie Russo	Episode: "Scandal"
2019–2020	Alexa & Katie	Dr. Corts	Recurring Cast: Season 3, Guest: Season 4
2019–2021	Animal Kingdom	Candice	Guest Cast: Season 4–5
2019–2022	Undone	Camila Diaz	Main Cast
2020	Connecting...	Maria	Episode: "Day 135"
2021–2023	With Love	Beatriz Diaz	Main Cast: Season 1, Recurring Cast: Season 2
2022	Lopez vs. Lopez	Connie	Episode: "Lopez vs. Christmas"
2023	How I Met Your Father	Raquel	Recurring Cast: Season 2
2024	Doctor Odyssey	Caroline Von Dreesen	Episode: “Plastic Surgery Week”
2025	Celebrity Weakest Link	Herself	Episode: “TV Moms”
2025	9-1-1	Mother	Episode: “Seismic Shifts”
2025	A Man on the Inside	Vanessa Cascade	Recurring Cast: Season 2

=== Music video ===
Year	Artist	Song	Role
1987	David Bowie	“Time Will Crawl”	Dancer

== Awards and nominations ==
- Soap Opera Digest Awards
  - 1991: Outstanding Female Newcomer (Daytime) – Santa Barbara (Nominated)
- ALMA Awards
  - 1998: Outstanding Actress in a Comedy Series – Union Square (Nominated)
  - 2007: Outstanding Actress (Television Series, Mini-Series or Television Movie) – George Lopez (Nominated)
  - 2011: Favorite TV Actress - Supporting Role – Switched at Birth (Nominated)
  - 2012: Favorite TV Actress - Supporting Role – Switched at Birth (Won)
- Young Artist Awards
  - 2004: Most Popular Mom & Pop in a Television Series – George Lopez (Nominated) with George Lopez
- Imagen Awards
  - 2004: Best Actress in Television Drama – American Family (Nominated)
  - 2004: Best Actress in Television Comedy – George Lopez (Won)
  - 2005: Best Actress (Television) – George Lopez (Nominated)
  - 2006: Best Actress (Television) – George Lopez (Nominated)
  - 2007: Best Actress (Television) – George Lopez (Nominated)

== See also ==
- List of Mexican Americans
