= Vanessa Marano =

American actress (born 1992)

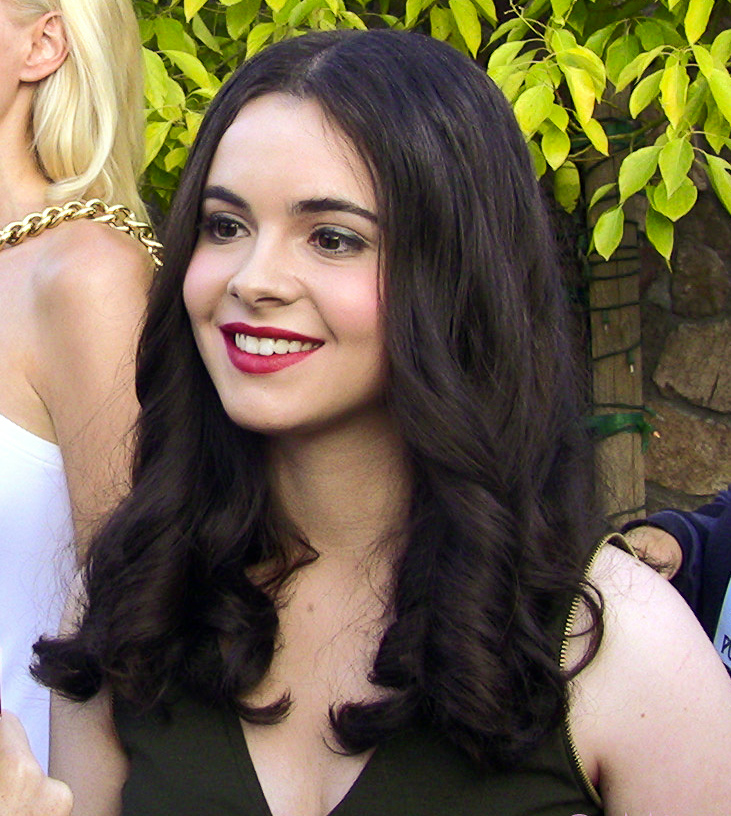
- Marano at the Saturn Awards in 2011
- Born: Vanessa Nicole Marano; October 31, 1992 (age 34); Los Angeles, California, U.S.
- Occupation: Actress
- Years active: 2002–present
- Relatives: Laura Marano (sister)

Vanessa Nicole Marano (born October 31, 1992) is an American actress. She has starred in television movies and had recurring roles in such series as Without a Trace, Gilmore Girls, Malcolm in the Middle, Ghost Whisperer, Scoundrels, Grey's Anatomy, and The Young and the Restless. From 2011 to 2017, she starred as Bay Kennish on the Freeform television series Switched at Birth.

== Early life ==
Marano was born in Los Angeles, California. Her mother, Ellen (née Sweeney), is the owner of the Agoura Children's Theatre. Her younger sister, Laura Marano, is also an actress. Marano speaks Italian, and her father Damiano Marano is of Italian descent.

== Career ==
Marano began acting professionally at the age of seven. According to an interview with her sister, her mother did not want either of her children to have careers in show business, and took the girls to an agent that she believed was most likely to turn kids down, only to find that Vanessa was accepted. Her sister Laura, who was on the scene with her, also impressed the agency. Since then, she has worked for productions at the Stage Door Theater. Marano's first major roles on television have been as Jack Malone's older daughter in Without a Trace (she and real life sister Laura play sisters), Valerie's stepdaughter in The Comeback and as April Nardini in Gilmore Girls. She also played Layne Abeley in The Clique based on the books by Lisi Harrison and Samantha Combs in Dear Lemon Lima. Marano starred in an episode of Ghost Whisperer alongside Jennifer Love Hewitt. Marano played Eden on The Young and the Restless and Hope on Scoundrels. From 2011 to 2017, she starred as Bay Kennish on the ABC Family TV show Switched at Birth. In 2013, she starred in Restless Virgins, which was inspired by a true story. In 2019, she starred alongside her sister Laura in Saving Zoë.

== Filmography ==
=== Film ===
Year	Title	Role	Notes
2003	Easy	Little Jamie	Uncredited
2008	The Clique	Layne Abeley	Direct-to-video film
2009	Dear Lemon Lima	Samantha Combs	
2013	The Secret Lives of Dorks	Samantha	
2014	Senior Project	Samantha "Sam" Willow	
2018	Daphne & Velma	Carol	
2019	Saving Zoë	Zoë	Also producer
2020	This Is the Year	Molly	
2020	How to Deter a Robber	Madison Williams	
2021	This Game's Called Murder	Jennifer Wallendorf	
2022	The Royal Treatment	N/A	Producer

=== Television ===
Year	Title	Role	Notes
2002–2009	Without a Trace	Hanna Malone	Recurring role, 12 episodes
2004	Grounded for Life	Lexie	Episode: "Tombstone Blues"
2004	The Brooke Ellison Story	Young Brooke Ellison	TV movie
2005	Six Feet Under	Tate Pasquese	2 episodes
2005	The Comeback	Franchesca	Recurring role, 12 episodes
2005	Malcolm in the Middle	Gina	Episode: "Malcolm Defends Reese"
2005–2007	Gilmore Girls	April Nardini	Recurring role, 13 episodes
2006	Boys Life	Sheila	TV movie
2007	Hell on Earth	Shelly	TV movie
2008	Man of Your Dreams	Maia	TV movie
2008	Miss Guided	Kelly	Episode: "Homecoming"
2008	The Closer	Theresa Monroe	Episode: "Problem Child"
2008	Ghost Whisperer	Alise Jones	Episode: "Ghost in the Machine"
2008–2010	The Young and the Restless	Eden Baldwin	Regular role
2009	Trust Me	Haley McGuire	Recurring role, 5 episodes
2009–2011	Dexter	Rebecca Mitchell	Recurring role, 6 episodes
2010	Untitled Michael Jacobs Pilot	Bailey Davidson	Unsold television pilot
2010	Past Life	Susan Charne	Episode: "Dead Man Talking"
2010	Medium	Jennifer Whitten	Episodes: "There Will Be Blood.. Type A", "There Will Be Blood... Type B"
2010	Scoundrels	Hope West	Main role
2010	Parenthood	Holly	Episode: "Date Night"
2010	Marry Me	Imogen Hicks	TV miniseries
2011	Private Practice	Casey	Episode: "The Hardest Part"
2011	Love Bites	Becky Lerner	Episode: "Too Much Information"
2011	CSI: Crime Scene Investigation	Samantha Cafferty	Episode: "CSI Down"
2011–2017	Switched at Birth	Bay Kennish	Main role
2012	Grey's Anatomy	Holly Wheeler	Episode: "The Girl with No Name"
2012	Boys Are Stupid, Girls Are Mean	Herself	Narrator
2013	Restless Virgins	Emily	TV movie
2013	Perception	Riley	Episode: "Toxic"
2014	NCIS: New Orleans	Natalie Lane	Episode: "The Recruits"
2016	Outcast	Sherry	Episode: "The Road Before Us"
2016	Gilmore Girls: A Year in the Life	April Nardini	Episode: "Summer"
2017	Silicon Valley	Stanford University student	Episodes: "Intellectual Property", "Teambuilding Exercise"
2018	Station 19	Molly	Episodes: "Not Your Hero", "No Recovery"
2018–2019	Dead Girls Detective Agency	Nancy Graves	Web series; main role
2018–2022	Bad Boy	Herself	Web series; recurring role, 5 episodes
2021	9-1-1	Sydney	Episodes: "Future Tense", "Suspicion"
2022	One Delicious Christmas	Abby Richmond	TV Movie

== Awards and nominations ==
Year	Award	Work	Result	Ref
2011	Teen Choice Award for Choice Summer TV Star – Female	Switched at Birth	Nominated	
2013	Teen Choice Award for Choice TV Actress: Drama	Switched at Birth	Nominated	
