= List of Switched at Birth characters =

The main cast of Switched at Birth

Switched at Birth is an American television drama series centering on Bay Kennish and Daphne Vasquez, who at the age of 15 learn that they were switched at birth. The wealthy Kennish family must struggle with the fact that their biological daughter is deaf from having meningitis as a child and must accept the character of working-class, recovering alcoholic Regina Vasquez, Daphne's single "mother". Bay and Daphne attempt to find out how their lives would have been if they hadn't been switched. The one-hour-long series premiered on June 6, 2011.

== Main characters ==
=== Daphne Paloma Vasquez-Kennish ===
Played by Katie Leclerc, Daphne Paloma Vasquez-Kennish (born Bay Madeline Kennish) is the legal daughter of Regina Vasquez and Angelo Sorrento and biological daughter of John and Kathryn Kennish. Daphne lost her hearing at a young age due to a bad case of meningitis. It is mentioned in the episode "Portrait of My Father" that Daphne's father abandoned her and Regina when she was little. It is later revealed that Angelo left upon learning that Daphne was not his biological daughter. She was raised by Regina, a single mother, with help from Regina's mother Adriana. In the pilot episode, Daphne and her mother learn of the switch and move into the Kennishes' guest house after experiencing financial difficulty. Daphne, like her biological father, shows a strong interest in athletics and sports throughout the series. She is also shown to be a vegetarian. At age eight, Daphne became best friends with future classmate Emmett Bledsoe after he defended her from school yard bullies.

Daphne has many love interests throughout the series, including Bay's ex-boyfriend Liam Lupo (with whom she breaks up on Bay's request), Toby's friend Wilkie, former employer Jeff Reycraft, Travis, Jace, Jorge, Campbell and her current love interest, Mingo.

In the second season, after learning that her high school is being faced with closure, Daphne organizes a rally and succeeds in keeping Carlton's doors open. Later, Daphne's relationship with her mother struggles after Regina reveals her preference to live with Bay, over her. Frustrated at her mother's decision to live with Bay and Angelo, Daphne jumps into a relationship with Jace, a guy who works in John's office. Together, they get caught up in the blackmailing of a United States Senator, ending the Senator's career and marriage. After breaking up with Jace, Daphne finds herself charged with blackmail and facing potential jail time.

In the opening of the third season, it is shown that Daphne is serving her sentence performing public service at a local free clinic. At the clinic, she befriends Campbell, a wheelchair-using pre-med student paralyzed from a snowboarding accident. She also runs into trouble at school, facing conflict with a new-hearing girl named Sharee, who was taken on as part of Carlton's bid to stay open by opening its doors to hearing kids.

After taking up field hockey to impress John (with whom she feels she has grown apart since being charged with blackmail), Daphne befriends Sharee. There is tension between the two at first, but after bonding over field hockey the two become friends. After finding out that Sharee's mother is severely mentally ill, they conspire to bring her into the clinic to be diagnosed under the pretense of Sharee getting a flu shot. After the psychologist is late to arrive, Sharee's mother lashes out, stabbing Daphne's boss with a pair of scissors. Daphne successfully saves Doctor Jay, leading her to consider a career in medicine.

While working at the clinic, Daphne finds herself the focus of the attentions of Campbell and her supervisor Jorge. After talking to Bay, Daphne decides not to act on her feelings for Campbell as he already has a girlfriend. She instead, accepts a date with Jorge, which turns awry when she faces criticism from his sister over her blackmailing of Senator Coto. After walking out of her date, she meets Campbell to shoot hoops, where he confesses his feelings for her, in spite of him being involved with someone else. Daphne, although admitting that she likes him, rebuffs his advances. Later, Daphne is seen kissing Jorge by Campbell, who then informs her that he has broken up with his girlfriend for her, leaving Daphne conflicted. Daphne, upon learning it is Campbell's 21st birthday, decides to throw him a surprise party. Upon seeing how much attention Daphne pays Campbell, Jorge ends their relationship, causing tension in their working relationship.

After much deliberation, Daphne finally decides it is Campbell she wants to be with. Despite initial tension, the two finally get together. However, after Daphne is offered a paid position in the Clinic, her relationship with Campbell starts to deteriorate. He is jealous over the fact that he has been in the Clinic longer, but he was never offered a paid position. After following through with Daphne's suggestion to ask Dr. J for a paid position, Campbell obtains a paid position. However, this position is in another clinic on the other side of town, so Campbell tells Daphne that they might not be seeing each other often.

Throughout season 3, the relationship between Angelo and Daphne improves significantly after Daphne asked him to learn sign language as to be able to communicate to each other more effectively. Due to Regina's project at East Riverside, Daphne and Angelo became increasingly worried for her safety. One night, after learning to shoot using a gun by Wes, Regina almost shot Daphne when she heard some noises at her store. That resulted in a heated argument between Angelo and Regina at the store. Angelo left the store full of anger and drove off. Then, Angelo swirled off the road, ending up in the hospital. The next day, Daphne was to retake her SAT examination to improve her score to get into a better medical school. She was unable to focus and left before she finished her exam as Angelo's condition was deteriorating. Unfortunately, Angelo was pronounced brain dead. The family decided to pull the plug on his life support after reading his will stating that if he were to be in a vegetative state, he wished to be let off life support. After learning that Angelo had a brain aneurysm while driving which may have occurred due to stress and anger, Daphne blamed Regina for his death. In the months following Angelo's death, Daphne's grief compels her to act out. She rebels against her parents, and is caught vandalizing Wes' construction property. She is later arrested for vandalism. To protect Daphne, who already has a criminal record, Bay takes responsibility for the crime.

Daphne goes to college and studies to become a doctor at UMKC. In the episode "Borrowing Your Enemy's Arrows" Daphne Introduces Mingo to John and Kathryn. His full name is Greg Shimingo, and John and Kathryn are in shock to find out that Greg's dad is Larry Shimingo, one of John's political rivals.

Mingo starts learning ASL to communicate with Daphne better and it increases their close bond but after Daphne kisses another guy in Mexico things start to spiral downwards and they end up breaking up so Daphne can go to China.

After living in China for a year with Bay and Travis they come home. Once home Daphne returns to school to find out that Mingo is now in a relationship. Daphne struggles a bit in school and thinks about quitting trying to be a Doctor as she know that being deaf will make it extra hard but after talking with family and friends she decides that she will still try to be a Doctor. In the end Daphne and Mingo get back together.

=== Bay Madeline Kennish-Vasquez ===
Played by Vanessa Marano, Bay Madeline Kennish-Vasquez (born Daphne Paloma Vasquez) is the rebellious legal daughter of John and Kathryn Kennish; and biological daughter of Regina Vasquez and Angelo Sorrento. Bay is often bratty, which tends to lead to most of the conflicts within the series, especially with her boyfriends and Daphne. She is shown to be a talented graffiti artist. In the pilot episode, Bay, upon learning that she does not share the same blood type as either of her parents, visits a geneticist with her parents. It is then that they are informed that there was a mix up with two babies at the hospital, and that John and Kathryn are not her biological parents. The discovery of the switch leads Bay to question her entire upbringing, resulting in her breaking up with her boyfriend, Liam and getting arrested for attempting to buy beer with a fake ID. That got her punished by her parents.

She becomes attracted to Ty, who is an old friend of Daphne, and briefly dates him in the first season before he leaves for the army. They continue their relationship in the second season when he returns. The relationship ends again when Ty pretends to have cheated on Bay then soon after leaves for the army again. Upon being caught sneaking around with Ty, her parents invite him around for dinner, during which, Ty accidentally lets slip that he has enlisted in the army. On his last night in town, the two almost sleep together, but Bay refuses and departs in tears.

Curious about her biological father, Bay sets out to search for him with help from Emmett. They are eventually reunited. She grows closer with her biological mother and father, even moving in with the two of them at one point. Bay is the first to find out that Angelo got another woman pregnant and now has another daughter as a result of a one-night stand.

After Ty's departure, Bay begins a relationship with Daphne's deaf best friend, Emmett, after he assists her in her search for Angelo. The two have a turbulent relationship due to their differences, but remain together, even after experiencing a number of setbacks including Bay's past relationship with Ty, Emmett's disapproving mother and the language barrier between them. Toward the end of the first season, Bay breaks up with Emmett after she finds out at prom that he slept with Simone her old friend. Following her break up with Emmett, Bay comes home from her summer trip with a new boyfriend. However, things do not last long between them after it becomes clear that Bay is still not over Emmett. Her feelings become more complicated when she sees a mural Emmett painted depicting their relationship, leading to her breaking it off with Alex.

After her initial break up with Emmett, Bay finds that she is immersing herself more and more in her street art, resulting in an unlikely friendship with a fellow artist by the name of Zarra. This friendship causes Bay to rebel against John and Kathryn to the point of her almost running away with Zarra to Mexico. She is stopped before leaving and brought home by Emmett and John. In the second season, Bay meets Noah, a fellow hearing student at Carlton. A short romance ensues, but Bay breaks up with Noah when she realizes that he has feelings for Daphne.

Ty returns in the second half of season two, resulting in their resuming their relationship. Bay expresses concern for Ty's mental well-being following his time serving in Afghanistan. The two eventually reconnect, sleeping together for the first time. Bay lose her virginity to Ty. However, in the season two finale, Ty, about to be recalled to the army, lies to Bay about sleeping with someone else after she finds girl's underwear on his bedroom floor, in an effort to save her from further hurt. In season three, Ty is shown to not be responding to any of Bay's efforts to contact him. However, when he finally does message her, Bay, determined to move on, deletes the message without responding. Bay eventually discovers Ty's lie, but remains adamant to move on with her life. In season 2–3, Daphne became rebellious and troublemaker and Bay became the good one and straight man.

In the second-season finale, upon learning that Ty had cheated on her, Bay turns to Emmett for comfort and support. In the third season, Emmett asks Bay's help on an astronomy project, where it is revealed that he is dating a new girl, Mandy, whom he met online. Despite responding to Bay's kiss, Emmett soon pulls away. He confesses to Bay that the reason they cannot be together is because she cannot let go of the past and forgive him for sleeping with Simone. Bay, however, apologizes and promises not to bring it up again, leaving some hope for the future.

In the third-season premiere, Bay starts her senior year and her first day at a new college art class. She makes a new friend named Tank. During a class assignment in which they have to draw a partner, Bay, in search of Tank, finds herself going to a frat party. In an effort to forget about Ty, she winds up heavily intoxicated. In her drunk state, she and Tank have a heart to heart regarding her broken heart and about why Ty cheated on her. Later on, Toby and Daphne pick up Bay from the party. After noticing the hockey sticks in the back seat, Toby informs Bay that she will be joining the Carlton field hockey team.

Bay begins dating frat boy and college football player, Tank, in the episode 'The Scream', despite having only having thought of him as a friend in the past. After Mary-Beth reveals to Bay that Ty had lied to her about cheating, she begins to question her relationship with Tank. Tank becomes even more irritated when he learns that Bay turned to Emmett for advice before consulting him. Things later take a turn for the worse when Bay accidentally reveals that Tank was the one who blew the whistle on a frat event, leading him to be blackballed from the fraternity.

Later in the season, Bay faces a number of challenges. She injures her hand at a party and is later revealed to have snapped a tendon in her hand. This leaves her unable to paint or sign during her months of recovery. As a result, she is moody and takes it out on everyone in her family.

In the spring finale, Bay researches online after having suspicions about Emmett's new girlfriend, Mandy. Despite her warnings, Emmett chooses to meet with her anyway. Mandy is shown to be nothing more than a fake profile designed to set up by Matthew, a classmate wanting to get back at Emmett. Emmett is subsequently beaten up. Realizing this, Bay rushes to find Emmett. After a heartfelt conversation, Bay and Emmett finally admit that they still love each other before sharing a kiss and proceeding to sleep together, resulting in Bay cheating on Tank, and later breaking up with him to return to Emmett.

Later, Bay experiences the loss of Angelo, her biological father and expresses regret that she did not spend more time with him. After Angelo's cause of death is discovered, it is feared that she may share the same biological trait that lead to Angelo's brain aneurysm.

Ending season 3, and starting season 4, Bay is on probation after taking the fall for Daphne when she vandalized her mom's (Regina Vasquez) worksite out of anger. Due to this, Bay and Emmett's plan to move to L.A. has been postponed. While Emmett leaves for L.A. Bay starts her community service. However, after giving a convicted criminal on probation a sandwich that had heroin in it, she is given another 100 days and house arrest. During season 4, Bay and Tank get drunk at a dorm party and wake up in bed together, with Bay unable to remember many events of the evening. This causes problems for her relationship with Emmett. in the end, this causes them to break up.

In the season 4 episode "Borrowing Your Enemy's Arrows" Bay tries to get over Emmett by moving on. Bay sees a guy walking with Travis walk past her at work and finds him attractive. She keeps her eye on him so she goes to their table and takes their order and they introduce each other. Garrett asks Bay if she was deaf, and she responds no but that her sister Daphne is deaf. Bay acknowledges that she knows how to sign really well. Bay asks Travis about Garret. Bay meets Daphne after work to find a new outfit; Daphne asks for what. Bay tells her she met a guy and her plan is to ask him out with that top that she is going to wear. Daphne asks who he is because he is a few years older. When Daphne learns it's Garrett, she says that he is a player and Bay said she can roll with that. Bay tells Daphne its time for her to move on. She asks him on a date.

Bay gets a call to have her own gallery, only to find out that Travis paid for everything and asked the people who actually own the gallery to pretend for her. Travis admits that he loves her and kisses her outside the gallery. She ends up going to China with Daphne for the summer but months later she gets a call that brings her back home.

Travis later follows her to China where they start dating. They live together in China for a year before moving back home. When they get home, Bay and Daphne move in together but Travis and Bay still date. Bay becomes a tattoo artist. In the finale, Bay and Emmett remain friends but nothing more. Travis asks Bay to move to Japan with him where he got a job as a professional baseball player but she decides to stay home because she is just starting a new career but that she knows they will survive a long-distance relationship and that she loves him.

=== Regina Vasquez ===
Played by Constance Marie, Regina Lourdes Vasquez is the legal mother of Daphne Vasquez and the biological mother of Bay Kennish. Before moving into the Kennishes' guest house, she, Daphne, and her mother Adriana lived in fictional working-class neighborhood East Riverside, Missouri, where she worked as a hair stylist. Prior to the beginning of the series, Regina had been raising Daphne as a single mother. Daphne's legal father, Angelo, abandoned their family after finding out that Daphne was not his daughter. After Angelo's leaving, Regina had Daphne tested again, only for the tests to reveal that Daphne was not her biological daughter either. In spite of this revelation, Regina chooses to keep the information to herself for fear of Daphne being taken away from her. This fact comes to light when photos of Bay are discovered, Regina having had a Private Investigator keep tabs on her biological daughter throughout the years.

After running into financial troubles, Regina and her family move into the Kennish's guest house so that the two families might get to know each other better. She is also shown to be a talented artist, indicating that Bay inherited her skills as an artist from her biological mother.

At first, there is tension between Regina and Kathryn and John, particularly regarding the way in which their daughters are raised. Despite these personality clashes, Regina and Kathryn become close friends. Regina later assists Kathryn in writing her book. John and Regina are even seen to get along, despite John's longstanding resentment toward Regina over her keeping quiet about Daphne's true parentage. Regina's best friend is Melody Bledsoe, the mother of Daphne's best friend Emmett. Throughout the first season, Regina enters into a short-lived casual relationship with Bruce, the ex-husband of Kathryn's friend and Patrick, an art gallery owner.

Angelo, Bay's father, reenters her life after reading an article about the switch, wanting to get to know Bay. He indicates to Regina that he wishes for them to get back together, but she refuses. Later, Angelo flees the Kennish household and it is revealed that he is under threat of being deported for an outstanding warrant for arrest in Italy. When he first returns, Regina wants nothing to do with him, but eventually she relents, even marrying him in order for him to avoid deportation. Her relationship with Patrick is effectively ended by this marriage. She later gets half of Angelo's money as a result of the marriage.

In "The Awakening Conscience", Angelo tells Regina that he got a woman named Lana pregnant, and upset, Regina walks out. Even though it happened before they married, Regina goes to tell Kathryn and tries to figure out how to tell Bay. Later however, when she's having lunch with Bay, she finds out Bay already knows and that Bay had gotten into a quarrel with him about it. Regina then realizes that Angelo told her about the pregnancy simply because he was afraid Bay might tell her first. Later, however, Lana decides to give the child up for adoption.

In the second season, Regina finds out that she can no longer cut hair or sign anymore, due to a medical problem with her wrists. She gets a new job, but is fired after the first day, because she oversleeps due to being drunk from a celebratory glass of Champagne. After this, and through the influence of Zane, a friend from her past, she starts drinking again. Bay, after finding out about Regina's drinking, confronts her about it and the two get into fight. Regina realize what she said to Bay she later apologize and asks her to forgive her and keep it a secret with the promise of returning to AA. Daphne later discovers her mother's alcohol problem when she finds her passed out on the sofa, smelling of alcohol. This further strains their relationship, which had already been suffering due to Regina's inability to sign. In "Introducing the Miracle", Regina's drinking is discovered on all sides and she's sent to rehab.

Regina returns early from rehab to find that Daphne has grown closer to the Kennish family. Feeling left out, she decides to move in with Angelo. Hours later, Bay also moves with Angelo, leading to her and Regina developing a stronger mother-daughter bond and relationship. Daphne and Regina begin to grow apart. Regina tells Daphne that life is easier living with Bay. Their relationship improves and they will cohabitate. Regina later supports Daphne when she is charged with blackmail.

Angelo and Regina reconsider their relationship, and decide to cohabitate after Bay and Daphne graduate from high school and leave for college.

Regina eventually gets a second chance at the job that she was fired from and begins to enjoy her work. However, in the third-season premiere, her boss announces that she is selling the business and Regina will lose her job. After getting advice from Bay, Regina decides to open her own business as an interior decorator with Angelo as chief investor. She is later hired by a property developer named Wes and her business begins to expand, unfortunately she finds out that Wes is scamming the people of East Riverside. As a result of this, the community retaliates and a brick is thrown through the window of Regina's store. After she begins carrying a gun in order to defend herself, Regina accidentally pulls the gun on Daphne after she enters Regina's store unannounced. This causes Angelo and Regina to get into a big fight during which Angelo storms off. He is later shown to have had a brain aneurysm and died. As a result of this fight, Daphne blames her mother for Angelo's sudden death.

=== John Kennish ===
Played by D. W. Moffett, John is the father of Bay and Toby Kennish and the biological father of Daphne Vasquez. He used to play professional baseball, and he and Daphne share a love for athletics. John later becomes friends with Daphne's basketball coach, Melody Bledsoe. Toward the end of the first season, John announces his intention to run for office.

John's relationship with his children, although close, is often strained. Sometimes he could be arrogant and selfish. He holds on grudges and has trouble letting things go. He and Bay clash repeatedly over her choices regarding her street art, particularly after his car wash gets tagged by graffiti artists. John and Toby find themselves at odds when Toby reveals his decision to get married, despite only being nineteen. His relationship with Daphne comes under strain when he finds out that she was charged with blackmailing a United States Senator and also her recent drug problem and vandalism. Despite this, John remains a dedicated father to all three of his children and husband to Kathryn.

Throughout the first two seasons, John frequently finds himself at loggerheads with Regina. The two strong personalities often clash over how to raise their children. For example, they run into conflict when John attempts to buy Daphne a car for her sixteenth birthday, much to Regina's disapproval. Their biggest argument, however, comes after John revealing his longstanding resentment toward Regina from keeping Daphne from him for thirteen years. The strain of the fight causes John to have a heart attack, Regina in effect, saving his life. While in an altered state, John has a dream in which he sees how different and dark their lives would have been had Regina told the hospital of the switch after learning about it. In the dream, Regina has died due to alcoholism and the girls did not get along. He comes to appreciate Regina and her place in their lives.

The third season sees John and Kathryn run into marriage troubles. A confused John struggles to understand the plight of an unhappy Kathryn, who is beginning to feel a little lost. Eventually, the situation becomes so desperate that John, in a drunken haze, kisses Nikki's mother Jennyne, for which Kathryn kicks him out of the house. In turn, John finds out that Kathryn plans on writing an erotic novel based on the sex lives of their friend's from John's baseball days. She finally tells him how unhappy she is, stating that they have nothing in common anymore and that they have fallen into a repetitive rut.

John, determined to make things work with his wife, does not give up. An argument with Renzo leads him to the realization that their biggest blunder may be his inability to change. After a failed attempt at winning Kathryn back, he finally gives her the 'adventure' she so longs for, staging a full scale dance number involving the whole family.

After Angelo's death, John feels guilt over denying Angelo a loan. He feels that this may have contributed to the stress that caused Angelo's brain aneurysm and subsequent death.

=== Kathryn Kennish ===
Played by Lea Thompson, Kathryn is the mother of Bay and Toby Kennish and the biological mother of Daphne Vasquez. At first, she wasn't too excited about telling her friends that Bay and Daphne were switched at birth for the sake of maintaining her reputation, but after some pressing from Regina, she finally comes clean at a fundraiser.

Despite initial tension and disagreement, Kathryn forms a close relationship with Regina. Kathryn helps get Regina a job at a local salon and, in turn, Regina helps Kathryn write her book based around the switch. Kathryn is committed to caring and looking after her children. She finds a way to get a mopey Toby out of the house after his break-up with Simone and consults with Regina about how to tell Bay about Angelo's baby. Kathryn later finds out from Bay that Regina has begun drinking again and was sent to rehab.

In the third season, Kathryn going to therapy, stating that she has been feeling 'lost' since the switch. Her psychiatrist proves to be unhelpful, cutting her short to prescribe her drugs and send her on her way. While wandering the streets, Kathryn decides, on impulse, to attend a tap dancing class. Here, she befriends Renzo.

Kathryn also comes to realise that she is unhappy with herself and in her marriage. Even after confessing her unhappiness to John, he fails to understand her emotions and situation. Eventually, the situation becomes so desperate that John, in a drunken haze, kisses Nikki's mother Jennyne, for which Kathryn kicks him out of the house. In turn, John finds out that Kathryn plans on writing an erotic novel based on the sex lives of their friends from John's baseball days. She finally tells him how unhappy she is, stating that they have nothing in common anymore and that they have fallen into a repetitive rut. After John tried to win her back by unintentionally buying her a piece of jewelry identical to one he had given her years before, Kathryn tells him that she wants adventure in their lives and that they have just grown apart.

However, John, intent on winning his wife back, finally decides give her the 'adventure' she so longs for, staging a full scale dance number involving the whole family. After realising that John had gone to the effort to plan the entire event and was willing to do anything to make their marriage work, the two reconcile.

=== Toby Kennish ===
Played by Lucas Grabeel, Toby Christopher Kennish is the older brother of Bay and the biological brother of Daphne. Toby plays guitar in a band called Guitar Face with his best friend Wilkie and Daphne's best friend, Emmett, who joins the band in "Dance Amongst Daggers."

Toby is an avid poker player, and it has gotten him into some trouble in the past. He tells his parents that he's playing miniature golf with his friends when, in reality, he is gambling. He has Daphne and Emmett help him win several poker games to help him get out of debt with Wilkie, but after Daphne misreads Wilkie's intentions, he loses a lot of money and is furious with Daphne. He subsequently sells his band equipment to help pay off the debt.

He begins dating Simone, an ex-friend of Bay's with a known reputation. She ultimately ends up cheating on him with Bay's boyfriend, Emmett. Toby breaks up with Simone upon learning about the affair.

Toby soon begins to consider starting a new band after another hanging out with Nikki, a girl he meets while performing gospel music, at his mother's request. As a result of his time with Nikki, he has a change of heart about Emmett and rekindles their friendship. Nikki eventually becomes his girlfriend. Their relationship is rocky as Nikki refuses to have sex with Toby because of a pledge she took. Emmett shows Toby a picture of Nikki at a party topless. Toby questions her about it and she explains that she is a changed person and owes him no explanation. Toby later realizes that he was wrong and surprises her at her youth group to apologize.

When Nikki then tells Toby that she is leaving for to work in Peru, Toby proposes, and she accepts. Later, when the man who killed Nikki's father is imprisoned, Toby decides to arrange a visit with him for Nikki in hopes that she will find closure over her father's death. After Nikki walks away from the man in the visiting center, Toby begins to chastise the killer. During the conversation, Toby is told that Nikki's father was a meth dealer and was killed as part of a deal gone bad. He eventually tells Nikki and the two then find that Nikki's mother had known all along.

Wedding plans for the two are made during the second half of Season two. Upon realizing the resistance to their nuptials by Toby's parents and Nikki's mother, the two call off the ceremony on the actual day, after sleeping together the night before, and they choose to elope instead. Nikki and Toby later separate as she is offered a permanent job in Peru. Determined to find himself, Toby subsequently packs up and leaves the country for his own adventure. He returns home in "In And We Bring the Light"

During season three Toby begins to date a Carlton teacher named Lily. The two date for the first half of season four, but break up after Lily develops a crush on a teacher at UMKC. It was revealed during the mid-season premiere of season four that Lily is expecting Toby's baby. After Lily finds out she is having a baby, she discovers the baby has Down Syndrome. After many bumps in the road they decide to keep the baby. Lily gives birth in the last episode and the child is named Carlton after the school at which Toby and Lily met.

=== Emmett Bledsoe ===
Played by Sean Berdy, Emmett is Bay's ex-boyfriend, and the longtime best friend of Daphne. He is deaf and rarely speaks verbally, preferring to communicate through American Sign Language. He rides a motorcycle (nicknamed "Ripley") and drives Daphne to their school, much to the dismay of the Kennishes. Despite their concerns and his being deaf, Emmett is proven to be a good driver. He is very protective of Daphne and has had a long-time crush on her, but doesn't make his feelings known to her. He is the only child in an all-deaf family, and for this reason has grown up having trouble relating to people who hear.

In the first season, despite the language barrier, Bay and Emmett form a bond after he assists her in finding her father. The two eventually begin a relationship. When they first get together, Daphne realises her feelings for her long-time best friend, culminating in them kissing in a car wash. Emmett, however, reaffirm his loyalty to Bay. He reassures Bay of their relationship by communicating with her verbally for the first time. This relationship, however, runs into a multitude of troubles throughout its course, including Emmett's family troubles and the interference of third parties.

Throughout his relationship with Bay, Emmett faces difficulties at home. He learns that his parents are getting a divorce and that his father has moved in with another woman. Bay, concerned for Emmett's well-being, goes behind his back to confide in his mother about her fears regarding Emmett living with her father. Emmett learns about their discussion and a fight ensues, resulting in Emmett sleeping with Simone, Bay's former friend and Toby's girlfriend. He does not reveal his actions to Bay until the night of prom, after which she promptly breaks up with him and leaves in tears. Emmett, however, is determined to win her back.

Months later, in an effort to win Bay back, Emmett paints their relationship in a timeline on a brick wall. Bay and Emmett meet and Emmett tells Bay that he is deeply sorry about what happened between him and Simone, and that it meant nothing to either him or Simone. However, Bay doesn't think they will ever be the same. Despite this, Emmett tells Bay he's going to keep trying to win her back no matter how long it takes, which is later confirmed by Daphne, who tells Bay that if Emmett has as so much as a sliver of hope, he'll wait forever. After Bay attempts to run away from home, it is Emmett who helps John find her. Bay and Emmett share a moment where he tells her that he will 'always come and find her'. They almost kiss but are interrupted by Bay's father.

At the beginning of the second season, a nervous Bay tells Emmett that she has begun a new relationship with Noah, in response, Emmett kisses her and asks her whether she has really moved on from him before he walks away. Later, Emmett tells Bay about the kiss between Noah and Daphne. He also meets a deaf girl (Ashley Fiolek) who is a fellow motorcycle enthusiast. Daphne, who is eager for Emmett to simply move on from Bay for the sake of his happiness, tells him that the new girl is perfect for him because she's deaf and into motorcycles, but Emmett tells her that he already has found his perfect girl in Bay.

Over the course of the second season, Emmett and Toby reconnect, with Toby even forgiving Emmett for sleeping with Simone. The two renew their friendship and form another band. Emmett even stands as best man at Toby's wedding. There, he makes a toast (appearing to subtly be directed at Bay) saying that he and Bay are meant to be together saying that she is the one he found. In the final episode of season 2, Emmett comforts a crying Bay after finding out about the end of her relationship with Ty.

The third season sees Emmett dealing with the integration of hearing kids into Carlton. He finds himself somewhat of an outcast among his peers after revealing the identity of a friend who had been slashing tires in order to make the new kids look bad.

Emmett asks Bay's help on an astronomy project, where it is revealed that he is dating a new girl, Mandy, whom he met online. Despite responding to Bay's kiss, Emmett soon pulls away. He confesses to Bay that the reason they cannot be together is because she cannot let go of the past and forgive him for sleeping with Simone. Bay, however, apologizes and promises not to bring it up again, leaving some hope for a future for the two of them. In a later episode, after seeing Bay struggle to paint with a hand injury, Emmett helps inspire her by taking her to a replica of 1950s Las Vegas built by a millionaire for his dying wife. He also helps her create the project and submit it to her class.

In the spring finale Emmett goes to meet Mandy for the first time. However, Mandy is revealed to be Matthew, a classmate wanting to get back at Emmett for having him suspended earlier in the season. Bay later finds him and after admitting their love for each other, the two sleep together After some initial apprehension due to the two of them having unprotected sex, Bay reaffirms her commitment to Emmett and promises to break things off with Tank. He also runs into some trouble with Matthew, who is now blackmailing him into staying quiet about the beating.

In 'Oh, Future' Emmett's father surprises his guests at a housewarming party with a wedding and the revelation that Emmett is to become a big brother. Emmett is initially angry with his father, but after some advice from Bay and his mother, he warms up to the idea of a new sibling.

In the beginning of season four Emmett decides to go to film school in LA after much persuasion by Bay which leads them to have a long-distance relationship. He doesn't make friends at first but then meets Skye. Skye instantly become fast friends with Emmett and accidentally kisses Emmett on a movie set. Emmett discovers the hardships of the long distance with Bay and wants Bay to come to LA despite her on probation. Emmett finds out about Tank and disconnects with Bay in anger. She flies down to LA only to find out Emmett made a script about personal things in their relationship. Emmett admits he feels that they have changed too much and he wants to break up with Bay. She says it's forever if he does this now and they end up going separate ways.

After the breakup, Emmett decides to start dating Skye as they have common interests but when Travis comes to visit he thinks that she is only hurting him. Emmett also comes to visit on the Mexico trip to help deaf kids there which ultimately leads to Bay finding out about Skye. Bay tries to make Emmett jealous out of anger and in the end the two come to an understanding to not hurt each other anymore.

Later on, in season 5 "–The Call", he said to Bay that he never should let Bay go meaning that he still has feelings for Bay.

=== Angelo Sorrento ===
Played by Gilles Marini, Angelo Sorrento is Bay's biological father, Daphne's legal father and Regina's husband. When Daphne was three, he became suspicious that she wasn't his daughter due to her fair skin, red hair, and green eyes. When Daphne contracted meningitis, he has a DNA test done and discovers the Daphne is not biologically his. Believing that Regina had an affair and not wanting to raise another man's child, he leaves Regina and Daphne. After learning about the switch, Angelo returns looking for Bay in "The Homecoming", surprising her at her art show. Despite resistance from the rest of her family, Bay forms a relationship with him, while Daphne and Regina want nothing to do with him. Angelo later implies to Regina that he would like to get back together with her and that had the girls not been switched, they would still be together.

When it comes out that Regina knew about the switch, Angelo is furious with her and felt that she kept him away from his daughter. They later reconcile and end up sleeping together, much to the dismay of Regina's mother. Angelo is arrested due to an outstanding warrant in Italy and faces deportation. When he was drunk, he beat a man for having an affair with his ex-fiancée. Regina's mother contacts the police so that Angelo would be arrested, and he is ordered back to Italy. In order to keep him in the country, Regina marries him so that he can gain US citizenship.

He sues the hospital for switching the girls and is awarded $5 million. Right after that, it is revealed that he got a woman, Lana, pregnant in a one-night stand. Regina is furious with him at first but they later reconcile. Lana wants to give the baby up for adoption, but Angelo convinces her not to at first.

After Regina relapsed with her alcoholism, she shows up at Angelo's apartment drunk. Angelo contacts Bay, who then gets Daphne, and they go to retrieve Regina. Angelo instead promises he will take care of Regina and asks Bay to go to the hospital with Lana, who is in labor. Lana gives birth to Bay's half sister.

In the third season, Angelo and Regina continue their relationship, having decided to wait until Bay and Daphne go off to college before moving in together. Daphne asks him to learn ASL and to move in with them since Regina has been in danger due to her job.

Angelo dies following a car accident as a result of a brain aneurysm. After doctors attempt to save his life, he is declared brain dead and the decision to take him off life support rests with the family. While searching his apartment for a way to contact Angelo's mother, Bay and Emmett discover Angelo's Last Will and Testament, which states that he should be taken off life support. Bay calls Angelo's mother who also is Bay's biological grandmother and speaks to her in French for the first time and gives his mother the opportunity to say goodbye to him over the phone. The family decides to have Angelo's organs donated.

== Recurring characters ==
=== Miles "Tank" Conroy ===
Played by Max Adler. He is a fraternity pledge and ex-boyfriend of Bay Kennish in season three. The two met in an art class and bonded after he gave Bay advice on handling her break up with Ty. After taking care of an injured Bay at a party, the two get together. Despite many tensions in their relationship, Tank de-pledges his fraternity for Bay. The two break up after Bay cheats on him with Emmett. Tank is next seen running into Travis, Toby, Mary Beth and Emmett at a club. Emmett initially conceals his identity from Tank, but after he is discovered an intoxicated Tank attempts to swing a punch at Emmett. He is shown to still have feelings for Bay. In season four, Bay and Tank get drunk at a dorm party and wake up in bed together. Bay doesn't remember parts of the evening, and during her attempt to figure out what exactly happened, the situation is reported to the college against her wishes. Despite Bay not remembering the night or coming to any conclusion as to what happened, the school ignores Bay's request not to punish anyone, and Tank is expelled. His fate after that is working at a restaurant revealed awkwardly on a date as he expresses that it is hard to get a job now that an unproven and alleged assault is on his record and Bay wants to fix it but does not.

=== Melody Bledsoe ===
Played by Marlee Matlin, Melody Bledsoe is the mother of Emmett Bledsoe and the best friend of Regina Vasquez. She is divorced from her ex-husband, Cameron, her polar opposite when it comes to parenting. Like her son, Melody is deaf although she can speak on some occasions due to being forced to attend speech therapy when she was young. She is overprotective and judgmental. Melody is upset when Emmett initially tells her that he wants to date Bay, believing that hearing and deaf relationships cannot succeed. This leads her to humiliate Bay at a dinner night with Emmett, Bay, and Regina. She gets into a dispute with Regina, but they reconcile and Melody eventually opens up to Bay when she realizes that Bay had good intentions. She also dates Daphne's boss Jeff but he breaks it off after realizing he loves Daphne.

In the second season, Melody and Emmett welcome Travis into their home after his father kicked him out. Melody now sees Travis as another son, even helping him with college applications and interviews. Later, in season 3 Melody endangers her job after getting rough with a student, Matthew, who had beaten up her son. She is dating Gabe and they soon get engaged. Gabe expresses the desire to adopt another deaf kid and, after much thought, she agrees.

=== Travis Barnes ===
Played by Ryan Lane, Travis is a deaf student who attends Carlton with Daphne and Emmett. His hearing parents do not sign and are said to be uninterested in his progress at school.

After losing his job as a janitor at Carlton, Daphne helps him get a job at John Kennish's carwash. Feeling isolated and lonely due to his inability to communicate fluently with his family at home, and fearing that his parents will soon kick him out when he turns 18, Travis sometimes secretly sleeps in the offices of the Kennish Carwash before moving in with Melody and Emmett. He is shown to have romantic feelings for Daphne. The two date briefly. Mary-Beth and Travis started dating in the second-season finale. They break up in season 4. In the Episodes "Instead of Damning the Darkness", and "It's Better to Light a little lantern" Travis and Bay hang out at a bar in Mexico both and after getting drinks, Bay insisted that they both do body shots which made Emmett mad. Both Travis and Emmett get into a fight but in the end they made up. Emmett asked Travis if he liked Bay, in which he just looked at Emmett, which proves that he likes Bay. He ends up paying for the gallery Bay believed was her big break and kisses her outside.

Bay later decides to go to China with Daphne for the summer but after going to visit Bay in China Travis decides to stay there with her and they begin to date. After living there for a year they move back home. Travis go to college and joins the baseball team. Emmett and Travis have a falling out because Travis is with Bay.

In season 5, Travis gets in a fight after a guy makes fun of people with disabilities and Travis hits him. This causes Travis to get kicked off the baseball team but he is offered to join a baseball team in Japan. Travis asks Bay to move with him but Bay decides to stay as she has just started a new career but that she knows they will survive a long-distance relationship and that she loves him. In the end Emmett and Travis make up and Emmett is going to go with him to Japan.

=== Mary Beth Tucker ===
Played by B.K. Cannon, is a friend of Bay and Ty and ex-girlfriend of Travis, who first appears in season two. Mary Beth works a summer job alongside Bay. She lost her brother, a former soldier, by way of suicide. As a result, she and Ty, who was stationed with her brother overseas, have a close relationship. In the second-season finale, Ty makes her promise not to tell Bay that he did not really cheat on her. However, this information is revealed early in the following season. At the end of the second season she begins dating Travis. She then breaks up with him in season 4. Later, she is revealed to be dating Miles "Tank" Conroy.

=== Adriana Vasquez ===
Played by Ivonne Coll, Adriana Vasquez is the mother of Regina Vasquez, the grandmother of Daphne Vasquez, and the biological grandmother of Bay Kennish. She had no idea that Regina knew about the switched but she was curious about why Daphne did not look like Regina. She had lived with Regina and Daphne for quite some time and is living with the two in the Kennishes' guest house. She had taken a huge disliking to Regina's ex-husband Angelo and ends up reporting him to the police. Regina told Adriana that she married Angelo and Adriana was not happy about it, and moved out of the guest house after she found out, but she later moved back into the guest house after she and Regina patched things up.

=== Simone Sinclair ===
Played by Maiara Walsh, Simone Sinclair is a classmate of Toby, Bay, and Wilkie at Buckner Hall. She used to be in a relationship with Wilkie Wilkerson and used to be best friends with Bay Kennish. They broke off their friendship when Bay figured out Simone's mean streak. She is described as the "school slut." She later starts a relationship with Toby, despite warnings given to him by Bay and Wilkie. During Daphne's time at Buckner, she becomes friends with Simone, but their friendship ends when Simone insults a Latina girl from Daphne's old neighborhood. At a basketball tournament, Simone had sex with Emmett. Despite constantly apologizing, Bay and Daphne have both refused to forgive her, thus dissolving both their friendships. When she is trying to have a conversation with Toby, he ignores her as well. She is last seen picking up an AA pamphlet, before bumping into Regina and quickly storming out of the room. Regina then finds Simone asking someone to buy her alcohol. Regina then goes up to Simone and talks to her in her car about why she was trying to buy alcohol. Simone told her that Bay and Daphne did not tell her what happened. Regina assures her that she knows what happened and Simone is frustrated that everyone hates her. Later on she lends Bay money to replace the money Bay got from her dad's safe to try to make amends.

In the alternate reality episode "Ecce Mono", Simone appears as Daphne's best friend.

=== Ty Mendoza ===
Played by Blair Redford, Tyler "Ty" Mendoza is the older ex-boyfriend of Bay Kennish. He is an old friend of Regina and Daphne. Daphne considers him her older brother. In the episode "Dogs Playing Poker," Ty admits he has enlisted in the army. He calls Bay later and she tells him she is dating Emmett. In "Mother and Daughter Divide" Ty returns home and hopes that he and Bay will start back up where they left off, but struggles to readjust to life after war. When he's scheduled to return to combat, Bay tries to get him to stay in Mission Hills. Later, at Toby and Nikki's wedding rehearsal dinner, Bay tells Ty about her plans to graduate early and go to art school in Berlin so they might still be together. Ty appears less than excited about Bay's plan and tells her no one knows what will happen.

Ty makes it appear that he is cheating on her in order for him to return to fighting in the war. Ty later explains to Mary Beth that he did it because the area he is being deployed to is even more dangerous than before and it would be easier to have Bay hate him now and move on with her life, rather than suffer his possible death overseas.

=== Liam Lupo ===
Played by Charles Michael Davis, he is Bay Kennish's ex-boyfriend and Daphne's ex-boyfriend. He goes to Buckner Hall with Bay and Toby. His family owns a restaurant called Fondo Di Lupo. In the episode "American Gothic," he takes Daphne to a music store, and all goes well until a couple of his friends show up and begin ridiculing Daphne. This leads Daphne to leave. Liam later brings fried zucchini to Daphne, knowing it's her favorite, but she takes the zucchini without any signs of forgiveness. However, she comes to Liam, and they get together. Daphne ends things with Liam a short time later as Bay is uncomfortable with the two of them dating.

=== James "Wilkie" Wilkerson ===
Played by Austin Butler, Wilkie is the best friend of Toby Kennish and the ex-boyfriend of Daphne Vasquez. He had scoliosis when he was 10 (as said in the episode 15) and had spinal fusion surgery, afterwards he wore a brace. He used to be in a relationship with Simone, but she was too controlling. Wilkie and Daphne begin their relationship after much pursuing on his part and were together until Wilkie was sent away to boarding school at the end of the first season.

=== Lana ===
Played by Annie Ilonzeh, Lana is the mother of Angelo's baby. She becomes friends with Toby when he gives her a ride home from the mechanic and she tells him that her family lives in Boston and they aren't aware that she's pregnant. After giving birth to her daughter, she puts the baby up for adoption and leaves for the airport.

=== Natalie Pierce ===
Played by Stephanie Nogueras, Natalie is a deaf student at Carlton who dislikes the idea of the pilot program due to the amount of funding having been cut from multiple programs at Carlton to fund the pilot program. As such, Natalie and some of her friends torment the hearing students, particularly Bay. When Bay and Natalie's rivalry appears to get out of hand, Melody hosts a mandatory retreat in the woods in order to bring the hearing and deaf students closer and dispel any animosity. At the end of the retreat, Bay and Natalie declare a truce, eventually becoming friends. It is later revealed that Natalie is a lesbian.

=== Jace ===
Portrayed by Matthew Kane. Jace is from Britain and is a coffee shop barista as well as Daphne's ex-boyfriend. He grew up geocaching and he explains to Daphne that geocaching's like a treasure hunt. Jace decides he'd like to learn how to use sign language for a month and he learns quickly. Jace was a temporary love interest of Daphne. In the season 2 finale "The Departure Of Summer", He and Daphne expose Senator Chip Coto as corrupt and a philanderer, destroying his career and marriage. Jace was subsequently deported, but he left happy for getting the truth about the corrupt Senator out.

=== Nikki ===
Played by Cassi Thomson, Nikki was married to Toby Kennish. She is a Christian musician and begins a new band with Toby and Emmett, soon after which she and Toby begin dating, however she quickly realizes that she doesn't think it would work out to be dating someone who does not believe in God.

She later reconciles with Toby, and they then become engaged. On the night before the wedding, they have sex and the next day call off the ceremony and elope to the courthouse. At the start of the third season, Nikki and Toby are in a long-distance relationship as Nikki is doing aid work overseas. Nikki and Toby later separate after Nikki is offered a permanent job in Peru.

=== Cameron Bledsoe ===
Played by Anthony Natale, Cameron Bledsoe is the father of Emmett Bledsoe. He is the ex-husband of Melody Bledsoe. Unlike Melody, he takes a carefree approach to parenting his son, while causes problems between him and his ex-wife, as she believes that he is not a good influence on Emmett. Emmett moves in with him in due to Melody's disapproval of Bay. After his divorce Cameron dated a younger woman named Olivia. Concern for Emmett's wellbeing is raised by Bay after the discovery of Olivia's bongs around the house and her use of marijuana. He subsequently breaks up with Olivia. Later on, he marries a woman named Debbie. They are expecting their first child.

=== Campbell Bingman ===
Played by RJ Mitte is a pre-med student and fellow volunteer at the free clinic where Daphne is ordered to serve out her hours at community service. Campbell is a former snowboarder and became a wheelchair user after an accident he had on the slopes. Despite having a girlfriend, he displays interest in Daphne, even ending his relationship for her. Despite initial tension, the two begin dating. However their romance comes to an end when Daphne is promoted over Campbell, which leads him to seek a position at another clinic across town.

=== Garrett ===
Played By Nyle DiMarco, Garrett is a deaf friend of Travis in season 4. He is a few years older than Travis and the other guys; in fact, he is in his early or mid twenties. It is said that he attended Carlton School. In 'Borrowing Your Enemy's Arrows', he first meets Bay and instantly finds her attractive. They start dating, even though Travis does not like the idea.

== Other characters ==
=== Craig Tebbe ===
Played by Samuel Page, Craig Tebbe is the newly appointed lawyer for the Kennishes' case against the hospital for the switch of Bay and Daphne. He is shown to have an affinity for redheads and tries to kiss Kathryn before she pulls away.

=== Patrick ===
Played by Christopher Wiehl, Patrick is the ex-boyfriend of Regina Vasquez. He is an art gallery owner and first met Regina at the hair salon that she worked at. She later tells him to look at Bay's artwork, but he ends up commending her on her own art, eventually placing one of her pieces on exhibition, much to Bay's dismay. Patrick broke up with Regina after Regina told him she married Angelo in order for him to stay in the country.

=== Amanda Burke ===
Played by Meeghan Holaway, Amanda Burke is the former lawyer of John and Kathryn Kennish. She was the first lawyer that the Kennishes appointed to help them with their case against the hospital, but they later fire her when they find out that she was in a relationship with one of the hospital board members. While she denied that her relationship would have any effect on how she'd perform for them in the case but John and Kathryn did not want to take any chances.

=== Olivia ===
Played by TL Forsberg, Olivia is the ex-girlfriend of Cameron Bledsoe. She is a bad influence on Emmett, as she encouraged him to drink away his stress. And she is very sex-crazed, always sharing details about her sex life. She is revealed to be a drug dealer, working out of Cameron's home.

=== Noah ===
Played by Max Lloyd-Jones, Noah is a hearing student at Carlton as part of the pilot program. He becomes friends with Bay and reveals to her that he has lost 60 percent of the hearing in his right ear due to Ménière's disease, and that he will eventually go deaf. He has begins a relationship with Bay, but Bay soon ends their relationship after she finds out from Emmett that Noah and Daphne kissed. Theoretically, it was rehearsing for the school play of Romeo and Juliet, but Noah admitted to Bay that he felt a connection with Daphne.

=== Zarra ===
Played by Tania Raymonde, Zarra is a street artist who works under the pseudonym "Medusa." Bay initially gets angry at Zarra for finishing Bay's piece on a van without permission, but eventually Bay befriends Zarra, feeling that she gets Bay's artistic way of life that she feels no one else understands. John and Kathryn disapprove of this friendship.

Zarra encourages Bay to join her on her hunt for an artist named "Smak" who ruins other people's street art by marking his name on the pieces. Eventually this lands her in jail. Zarra asks Bay to post a $1,500 bail without telling her that her friend was also jailed for the same reason, driving Bay to steal it from John's safe at the carwash. Zarra and Bay and some friends of Zarra's were caught by the police while doing street art in an alleyway. They were let go due to Bay's Dad being John Kennish, the former baseball player.

After John yells at her, Bay temporarily moves in with Zarra in her trailer, where the two make plans to drive to Mexico. When it becomes clear that Zarra has no idea where they are going, Bay realizes that Zarra isn't exactly the greatest friend. She later bails on Bay and runs away to Mexico.
