= The Year of Spectacular Men =

- Theatrical release poster
- Directed by: Lea Thompson
- Written by: Madelyn Deutch
- Produced by: Gordon Gilbertson; Howard Deutch; Zoey Deutch; Daniel Roth; Damiano Tucci
- Starring: Madelyn Deutch; Avan Jogia; Nicholas Braun; Jesse Bradford; Lea Thompson; Cameron Monaghan; Brandon T. Jackson; Zach Roerig; Melissa Bolona; Zoey Deutch
- Cinematography: Bryan Koss
- Edited by: Seth Flaum
- Music by: Madelyn Deutch
- Production companies: Parkside Pictures; Tadross Media Group
- Distributed by: MarVista Entertainment
- Release dates: June 16, 2017 (LAFF); June 15, 2018 (United States)
- Running time: 102 minutes
- Country: United States
- Language: English

The Year of Spectacular Men is a 2017 American comedy-drama film directed by Lea Thompson in her feature film directorial debut. It stars Thompson's daughters Madelyn Deutch (who also wrote the screenplay and composed the score) and Zoey Deutch (who also produced). Thompson's husband Howard Deutch also served as a producer.

Izzy Klein is a young woman fresh out of college as she strikes up and ends relationships with a few men, and struggles to navigate the failures of post-college adulthood, leaning on her mother and younger sister for support.

The film had its world premiere on June 16, 2017, at the LA Film Festival. It was released in theaters, on digital HD, and through video-on-demand services on June 15, 2018, by MarVista Entertainment.

== Plot ==
The film opens with five different men commenting on their perspective of Izzy Klein. Sabrina, her very successful Hollywood actress sister, encourages her to finish her degree and then take a gap year.

At home in her boyfriend Aaron's NYC apartment, Izzy talks about Sabrina's proposal but he is less than supportive and quickly gets upset. He's insecure, equating her going with her sister with his band leaving him. Izzy goes, taking her things to Sabrina's hotel room. Sabrina sees Izzy in the morning, a total mess in the disastrous-looking corner of the hotel room, and offers to let her move in with her and her boyfriend in LA – under the stipulation that she pick up after herself.

Izzy has to work on a scene from a Shakespeare play to pass a course to complete her degree. A theatre minor, Ross, is assigned to work with her, and she's very attracted but he seems oblivious. The girls' mom, Deb, goes to Izzy's college graduation, and afterward, they go to lunch with Amythyst, Deb's very young "soul walker". She's not much older than Izzy, a vegan into yoga who's recently taken Deb with her on a retreat. Deb is openly critical of Izzy's life decisions, although Izzy is supportive of her mother's relationship.

In LA, Izzy moves in with Sabrina and her boyfriend, Sebastian. They take her to a party where Sabrina plans to help her network, but before she can, Izzy hooks up with Aaron's former drummer, Logan. They continue seeing each other until he goes on tour a few months later. Sabrina returns home after a film's promotional tour with Zac Efron. Izzy's had a few unsuccessful auditions and her agent has dumped her, so she announces that she's finished. She spends the next few months in her room, binge-watching programs on her laptop.

Izzy goes out to see Logan's band when they return in December, coming face to face with Aaron, who's been invited to the gig. She goes off with Logan, who tells her he's back with his ex. Upset, she leaves and is followed out by Aaron and they argue.

The girls meet their mom for Christmas in Lake Tahoe – it's the first time Sabrina is meeting Amythyst, as she is blindly loyal to their dead dad's memory. Izzy meets a ski patroller, Mikey, and she convinces her sister and Sebastian, who are fighting over the tabloids' insinuations of her and Ephron, to go with her to meet Mikey for a drink. Deb and Amythist are already in the tavern when they arrive. Soon Deb has to leave so Sabrina, still upset with Sebastian, goes with her. Izzy goes home with Mikey, spending the whole night chatting, while Sebastian is left with Amythyst. The next morning, both Deb and Sabrina's relationships are over.

Izzy accompanies Sabrina on a film shoot in San Francisco as her assistant. Izzy chats with the film's director, Charlie, and lets him in on a secret she and her mom keep from Sabrina. Over the next few months, Sebastian keeps sending Sabrina flowers, which she throws away. Izzy gets closer to Charlie, but when they're finally alone, she finds the painfully shy young director is so introverted he has never been completely intimate with anyone.

Sabrina finally gets a card with the flowers, convincing her to take Sebastian back. The sisters return to LA, with Izzy's gap year completed and a calm sense of optimism.

== Cast ==
- Madelyn Deutch as Izzy Klein
- Zoey Deutch as Sabrina Klein, Izzy's younger sister
- Lea Thompson as Deb Klein, Izzy and Sabrina's mother
- Melissa Bolona as Amythyst Stone
- Nicholas Braun as Charlie Reed
- Avan Jogia as Sebastian Bennett, Sabrina's boyfriend
- Cameron Monaghan as Ross Wyatt
- Brandon T. Jackson as Logan
- Zach Roerig as Mikey
- Jesse Bradford as Aaron Ezra
- Bob Clendenin as Seven
- Alison Martin as Marg
- Troy Evans as Sketch
- Alec Mapa as Overzealous Casting Director

== Production ==
In September 2015, it was announced that Lea Thompson is making her feature film directorial debut in this film, starring her actress daughters Madelyn Deutch and Zoey Deutch. Filming started later that month in Los Angeles, New York City, Lake Tahoe and San Francisco.

The Year of Spectacular Men is produced by Parkside Pictures and Tadross Media Group. Producers are Parkside's Damiano Tucci and Danny Roth along with Gordon Gilbertson and Howard Deutch; executive producers are Michael Tadross Jr. and Christopher Conover. Zoey also shares the production credit.

== Release ==
The Year of Spectacular Men held its world premiere at the LA Film Festival on June 16, 2017, under the "LA Muse" section. It also had its screenings at the Twin Cities Film Fest, the LA Femme Film Festival and the 20th-anniversary edition of the SCAD Savannah Film Festival in October 2017, and at the Napa Valley Film Festival in November 2017.

In January 2018, MarVista Entertainment acquired distribution rights to the film. The film was scheduled to be released on June 15, 2018. It was released in theaters, on digital HD and through video-on-demand services on June 15, 2018.

== Reception ==
On review aggregator website Rotten Tomatoes, the film holds an approval rating of 65%, based on 31 reviews, and an average rating of 6/10. The site's consensus states, "Lea Thompson proves as capable behind the camera as her daughters are before it in [the film], though its charming sensibilities are at times overshadowed by an inconsistent script." Metacritic, which uses a weighted average, assigned the film a score of 61 out of 100, based on 9 critics, indicating "generally favorable" reviews.

Sheri Linden of The Hollywood Reporter described the film as "smart and vivacious when it isn't trying too hard" and added "for the twentysomethings with whom the movie is sure to click, the sarcastic jabs at such easy targets as health-conscious New Age types might feel fresh rather than strained. But even with the screenplay's sometimes screechy missteps, the Deutch duo hold the screen with charm and intelligence to spare". Scott Menzel of We Live Entertainment wrote that "Madelyn Deutch, Zoey Deutch, and Lea Thompson are a triple threat in this quarter life crisis tale that deserves your attention".
