= I Go Crazy =

I Go Crazy may refer to:

- "I Go Crazy" (Paul Davis song), 1977, and subsequently released by Barry Manilow
- "I Go Crazy" (Flesh for Lulu song), 1987
- "I Go Crazy", a bonus track on the Queen album The Works
- "I Go Crazy", a song by Huey from Redemption
- "I Go Crazy", a song by Mani Sharma, Rahul Nambiar and Jey from the 2008 Indian film Kantri

== See also ==
- Go Crazy (disambiguation)
- Going Crazy (disambiguation)
