= Plastic Fantastic (disambiguation) =

Plastic Fantastic may refer to:

- Plastic Fantastic, a 2009 book by U.S.-based science reporter Eugenie Samuel Reich
- Plastic Fantastic, a 1989 album by Flesh For Lulu
- Plastic Fantastic, a 1990s English band, part of the Romo movement
- Plastic Fantastic a 2016 episode of Real Housewives of Cheshire
- "Plastic Fantastic Lover", a 1967 song by Jefferson Airplane
