= Walkaway Joe (film) =

2020 film directed by Tom Wright

- Promotional poster
- Directed by: Tom Wright
- Written by: Michael Milillo
- Produced by: Rachel McHale; Minor Childers; Michael Milillo
- Starring: David Strathairn; Jeffrey Dean Morgan; Julian Feder; Julie Ann Emery
- Cinematography: Steven Bernstein
- Edited by: Jan Kovac
- Music by: Christophe Beck; Jake Monaco
- Production companies: Double Dutch International; Swing Lake Entertainment
- Distributed by: Quiver Distribution
- Release date: May 8, 2020
- Running time: 89 minutes
- Country: United States
- Language: English
- Budget: $2 million

Walkaway Joe is a 2020 American drama film directed by Tom Wright in his feature directorial debut. The film stars David Strathairn, Jeffrey Dean Morgan, Julian Feder, and Julie Ann Emery. It tells the story of an unlikely friendship between a young boy searching for his father and a wandering loner hiding from his past.

== Cast ==
- Jeffrey Dean Morgan as Cal McCarthy
- David Strathairn as Joe Haley
- Julian Feder as Dallas McCarthy
- Julie Ann Emery as Gina McCarthy
- Evan Gamble as Chris
- Andrea Frankel as Becka
- Robert Walker-Branchaud as Earl

== Production ==
Filming began in October 2018 in St. John the Baptist Parish, Louisiana.

== Release ==
The film was released on digital and VOD on May 8, 2020, by Quiver Distribution.

== Reception ==
Christy Lemire of RogerEbert.com awarded the film one and a half stars. Hunter Lanier of Film Threat gave the film a 2 out of 10.
