= Pilot (The Rookie) =

- The Rookie episode
- Episode no.: Season 1 Episode 1
- Directed by: Liz Friedlander
- Written by: Alexi Hawley
- Original air date: October 16, 2018

Guest appearances
- Mircea Monroe as Isabel Bradford; Tessa James as Rey; Anthony Bonaventura as Lance Selby; Renes Rivera as Carlo; Julie Ann Emery as Stacy

Episode chronology
← Previous —	Next → "Crash Course"

The pilot episode of American television series The Rookie aired on October 16, 2018 on ABC. This episode introduces the titular character John Nolan (Nathan Fillion) as he begins his career with the Los Angeles Police Department. It received mixed reviews from critics, who praised the performances (particularly Fillion's) but criticized the premise as formulaic and some of the characters as unlikable.

== Plot ==
In Foxberg, Pennsylvania, John Nolan is storing his divorce papers and wedding ring in a safety deposit box when he is caught up in a bank robbery. He manages to stall the robbers long enough for the police to arrive and apprehend them. An amazed bank teller praises Nolan's bravery.

Nine months later, Nolan graduates from the police academy and is starting his career alongside fellow LAPD rookies Lucy Chen and Jackson West. At roll call, watch commander Sergeant Wade Grey pairs each rookie with a training officer: Nolan is paired with the ambitious Talia Bishop, Chen with the abrasive Tim Bradford, and West with no-nonsense Angela Lopez. Grey also makes a point of insulting what he perceives as Nolan's mid-life crisis. The rookies are briefed on patrol procedures and terminology.

Nolan and Bishop's first call is to a domestic disturbance; after an initial misunderstanding they realize the bodybuilder husband is being abused by his diminutive wife, but fail to convince him of this. While driving, Bradford slams on the brakes and tells Chen he's been shot, forcing her to walk alongside the patrol car when she fails to orient herself or locate the nearest hospital. He tests her again by pulling over a truck of Spanish-speaking gardeners and insulting them in racist terms, calling her out when she deliberately mis-translates. West and Lopez arrest a lesbian couple who are turned on by breaking into people's houses.

Responding to a call about a man vandalizing cars, Nolan and Chen are forced to chase down the suspect, who rambles about a "unicorn" having kidnapped his son, Lucas. Realizing Lucas was accidentally left in a car on a hot day, Nolan and Bishop search for him. Although Lucas is found and rescued, Bishop criticizes Nolan's sloppy procedure and allowing his emotions to get the better of him.

At lunch, the rookies commiserate while Bradford mocks Lopez and Bishop for their competition to see who makes Detective first. Bishop and Nolan are called back to the domestic disturbance, which has escalated; they find the wife stabbing the husband in the neck. Bishop subdues the wife, but the husband dies in Nolan's arms, leaving him shaken. When Grey arrives for a report, Talia commends Nolan's bravery, but Grey continues to see his age as a liability. The next morning, Nolan and Chen are revealed to be in a secret relationship.

After hazing Nolan by showing bodycam footage from his foot chase, Grey informs the shift about Lance Selby, a parole violator with a violent history. Nolan and Bishop meet a known associate of his, discovering a stash of drugs in his boxing gym. Meanwhile, Bradford punishes Chen by ordering her to search a combative drug dealer, which escalates into a fight that she wins. As they lead him away, a woman confronts and demands money from a shocked Bradford, who obliges. He admits to Chen that the woman is his estranged wife Isabel, whom he hasn't seen in a year. When Bishop calls for backup in apprehending Selby, Bradford responds to end the conversation.

Moving to head off a back exit, Bradford and Chen stumble upon Selby, who opens fire; Bradford is badly wounded as Chen struggles to pull him to safety. When they arrive Nolan impulsively moves to protect Chen, allowing Selby's associate to ambush Bishop before she subdues him. Lopez and West encounter Selby, who starts shooting; Lopez is shocked when West freezes up and does not return fire. When Selby takes a woman hostage, Nolan tries to talk him down before shooting him in the leg and arresting him. Bishop notices Chen and Nolan's closeness in the aftermath.

Grey promises to throw Nolan off the force for leaving Bishop behind but is overruled by Captain Zoe Anderson, who believes Nolan brings valuable perspective to the job. Bradford makes it out of surgery. Bishop advises Chen to break things off with Nolan, warning it will taint her reputation if they are discovered. A disgusted Lopez tells West she will get him fired if he panics again. Nolan confronts Grey and tells him he has no intention of quitting; Grey responds that he will do everything possible to convince Nolan otherwise, but none of it will matter if Nolan believes being a cop is a calling as it is for Grey.

== Development ==
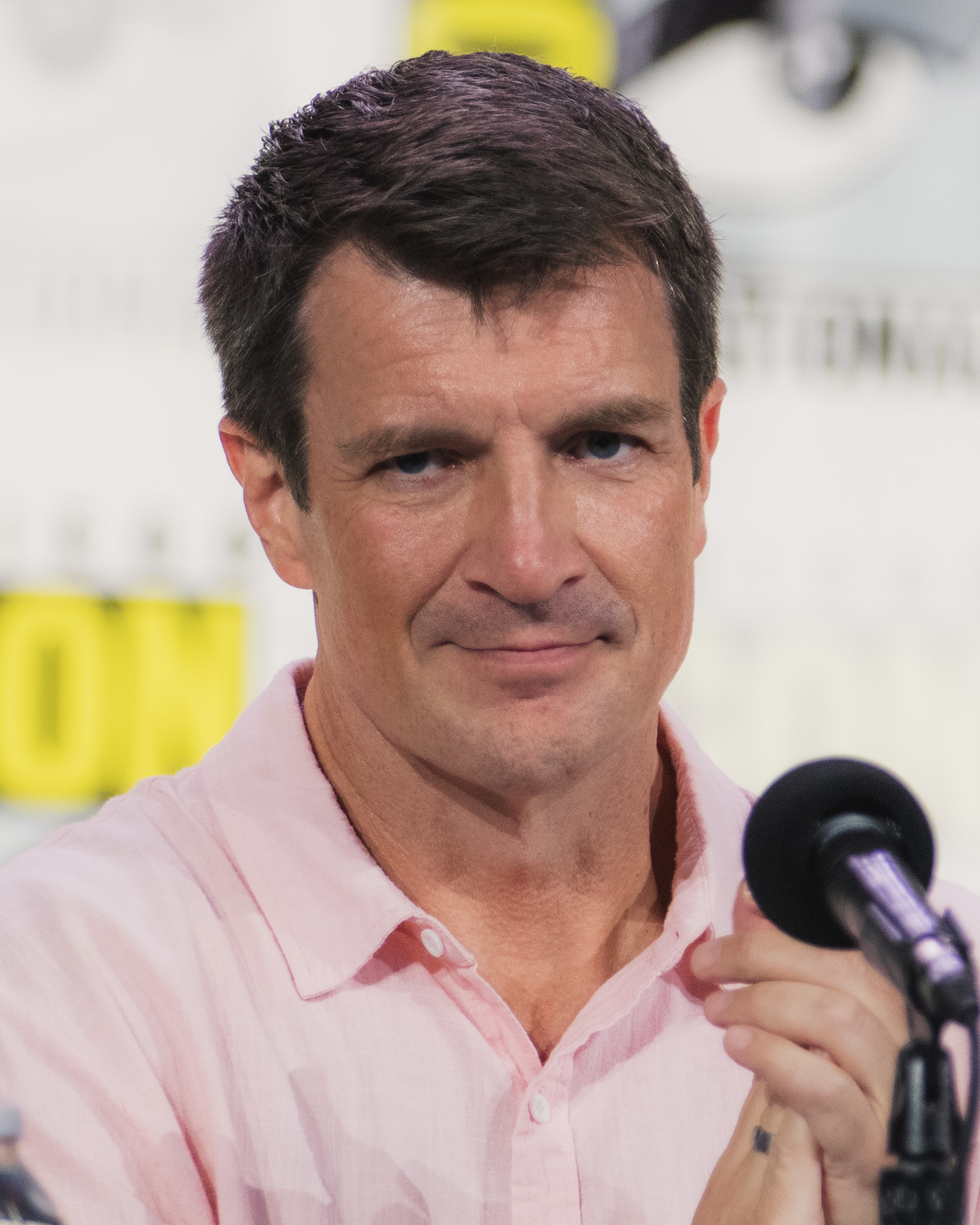
Nathan Fillion who portrays John Nolan

On 26 October 2017, it was reported in Deadline that Nathan Fillion had been cast in The Rookie. Nellie Andreeva who reported the story said "Nathan Fillion is returning to ABC with a new light crime drama series. In a competitive situation, ABC has nabbed The Rookie, starring and executive produced by the former Castle star, with straight-to-series order. The show, from The Mark Gordon Company and ABC Studios, reunites Fillion with his Castle executive producer/co-showrunner Alexi Hawley." It was then explained "Written by Hawley, The Rookie is inspired by a true story. Fillion plays John Nolan, the oldest rookie in the LAPD. At an age where most are at the peak of their career, Nolan cast aside his comfortable, small-town life and moved to L.A. to pursue his dream of being a cop. Now, surrounded by rookies twenty years his junior, Nolan must navigate the dangerous, humorous and unpredictable world of a "young" cop, determined to make his second shot at life count.

On 7 February 2018 Variety reported that Afton Williamson and Eric Winter had been cast as Talia Bishop and Tim Bradford respectively. Their characters got billed as "Williamson will play Talia Bishop, a newly promoted training officer whose first assignment is Fillion's forty-year-old rookie. Winter will play Tim Bradford, an overbearing training officer." The following day Deadline announced that Melissa O'Neil had been cast as a love interest for Fillion, it was said "After casting Nathan Fillion's new female partner, ABC's straight-to-series light crime drama The Rookie has locked in a potential new love interest for the Castle alum. Dark Matter alumna Melissa O'Neil has been cast as one of the female leads in The Rookie, starring and executive produced by Castle alum Fillion."

Actor Richard T. Jones was then cast in the show with his announcement coming on February 12, 2018. Andreeva reported "Wisdom of the Crowd's Richard T. Jones is set to co-star opposite Nathan Fillion in ABC's straight-to-series light crime drama The Rookie, toplined and executive produced by the Castle alum."

On 15 February 2018, Titus Makin Jr. was then cast as Jackson West. It was reported "Makin will play Officer Jackson West, an eager rookie whose father is a high-level commander in the LAPD."

Denise Petski of Deadline then reported on 23rd February 2018, details of Alyssa Diaz's character by reporting "Diaz will play Angela, an LAPD Training Officer on the cusp of making detective-trainee. That all gets threatened when she gets assigned to Jackson West. Not only does she have to play the usual politics within her own station house, she now has her hands full with an entitled rookie whose father has a say in her career at the LAPD."

Mercedes Mason was the last of the regulars to be cast, it was said "Mason will play Capt. Zoe Andersen, Nolan's confident and irreverent commanding officer."

== Reception ==
Ariba Bhuvad writing for TV and City gave the episode a B- highlighting some issues including "Some of the characters, however, try too hard and it comes across in the execution of their dialogue. Case in point is Winter's character, Tim, who is just an a**hole all around, and sometimes tries too hard to be so. However, there is a moment in the pilot that does momentarily show a softer side to him, so there's that." She added some positive notes by saying "I enjoyed the dynamic of the cast, and I think it works well for the plot of the show, and with Fillion at the front and center, everything comes together nicely."

Kevin Yeoman of Screen Rant gave the episode a positive review by saying "What makes The Rookie's pilot episode stand out is the degree to which it shows instead of tells. Or, rather, the way it gets all its telling out of the way with an opening sequence that favors brevity over long-winded explanations of why Nolan relocates to Los Angeles to be a police officer after a lifetime of construction work and a recently failed marriage. The opening is free from too many extraneous details, it has an admirable "just the facts" quality to it that, in addition to being playful almost to the point of being absurd — Nolan stalls a would-be bank robber by telling him (and the audience) his life story — it also demonstrates a willingness to let the past be the past and to put Nolan's uncertain future in the driver's seat." He then concluded by saying "The hour shifts between incidents requiring a police response with surprising frequency, never stopping on one case long enough to give its characters time to breathe. That pace also provides plenty of time for the cops' personalities to intermingle and clash where necessary, creating a more believable (if heightened) world for the show's characters to interact and grow among one another. Though it's not a home run, The Rookie is a better-than-expected new series in what has otherwise been a disappointing fall season."

Christine Orlando of TVFanatic reviewed the episode by saying "I must admit that I didn't have high hopes for The Rookie." She then changed her viewpoint and said "That brings me to this review where I have to eat my previous words because The Rookie Season 1 Episode 1 was damn good. It's a unique cross between the now-defunct Southland and Rookie Blue. It's not quite as dark and serious Southland but not as light as Rookie Blue. It is a solid, entertaining middle ground. Fillion is darn near perfect as John Nolan. Nolan made me chuckle even while feeling his despair in this The Rookie quote: 'Right now I'm just trying to remember to wear pants.'" She concluded the review by saying "Although this is Officer John Nolan's story, he is the rookie in the title; I like that it involves an entire team of characters with their own backgrounds and stories, and it's a good sign that I already care about many of them."

Dino-Ray Ramos of Deadline gave the episode a mixed review due to some of the jokes made in the episode over Nolan's age. He highlighted "The "you can't teach an old dog new tricks" premise is one that has been tackled by TV series and movies many times before, and The Rookie is thrown on the pile and easily can get lost in the shuffle. Within the first 10 minutes of the series, Sgt. Grey lobs old-age cracks at John during a briefing meeting introducing the new recruits. He says one of the three is "pushing an expiration date" and that he was "born before disco died." These jokes get old — and irritating — fast. It's one thing to have old-age jokes throughout the pilot to provide fuel for character growth, but to have them be so basic and bland makes it worse and takes away from the intent of the show." Ramos then highlighted "John Nolan definitely is the type of character suited for Fillion — a mature, thoughtful man with baggage who is trying to live a new life post-divorce. As he enters the police force, we see his experiences of responding to calls of domestic abuse and see him go on a foot chase in hot pursuit of a negligent father. As a rookie, he gets hyper-criticized for his work — and I get it. As one of the new kids on the block, a considerable amount of hazing is in order. But when you throw in the stale, mean-spirited old-age insults, it pretty much negates everything about this show that could potentially make it decent."
