= Madelyn Deutch =

American actress (born 1991)

- Born: March 23, 1991 (age 35); San Fernando Valley, California, U.S.
- Occupations: Actress; musician; writer
- Spouse: Zach Carlisle
- Children: 1
- Parents: Howard Deutch (father); Lea Thompson (mother)
- Relatives: Zoey Deutch (sister); Robert Walden (grand uncle)

Madelyn Deutch (born March 23, 1991) is an American actress, musician and writer. She is known for writing, acting in a lead role, and composing the musical score for the feature film The Year of Spectacular Men.

== Early life ==
Deutch was born in San Fernando Valley, Los Angeles County, California. She is the elder daughter of actress Lea Thompson and director Howard Deutch and sister of actress Zoey Deutch. Her mother, from Minnesota, is of Irish ancestry while her father, from New York, is of Jewish ancestry.

== Career ==
She is known for her recurring role in the television miniseries Texas Rising. She played the role of Dakota in Robert Kirkman's Outcast. She acted alongside her mother and sister in Mayor Cupcake.

Deutch played Alex in the 2014 American drama film 50 to 1 which is based on the true story of Mine That Bird, an undersized thoroughbred racehorse who won the 2009 Kentucky Derby. In 2017, she played the lead role alongside her sister Zoey Deutch in her mother's directorial debut The Year of Spectacular Men. She portrays a young woman fresh out of college who kindles and torches relationships with several men, including characters played by Jesse Bradford and Nicholas Braun. She also wrote the script for the film.

== Personal life ==
Deutch is married to Zach Carlisle and they have one child together, a daughter named Robbie June Carlisle (born 2025).

== Filmography ==
=== Television ===
Year	Title	Role	Notes
2015	Texas Rising	Curls	3 episodes
2016–2017	Outcast	Dakota	8 episodes

=== Film ===
Year	Title	Role	Notes
2011	Mayor Cupcake	Anita Maroni	
2012	Christmas Twister	Chloe	
2014	Like a Country Song	Zoey	
2014	50 to 1	Alex	
2014	The Dog Who Saved Easter	Minnie	
2017	Painted Horses	Ms. Hoog	
2018	Windsor	Maisie	
2018	The Year of Spectacular Men	Izzy Klein	Also writer and composer
2018	Bad Company	Roxy	
2020	Teenage Badass	Candice White	

=== Video games ===
Year	Title	Role	Notes
2012	Mystery Case Files: Shadow Lake	Ghost Patrol Tech Kelli	

== Music career ==
She is a member of the LA-based band BLEITCH with Piers Baron. She has composed and performed songs with Bleitch for her movie The Year of Spectacular Men.

Singles (with BLEITCH)

- 2014 - This is Our Youth (part of background soundtrack of Episode 75 "Lost Cause" of True Blood
- 2015 - Paint by Numbers
- 2015 - Crime
- 2015 - Speaking of Moments
