= Julie Ann Emery =

American actress

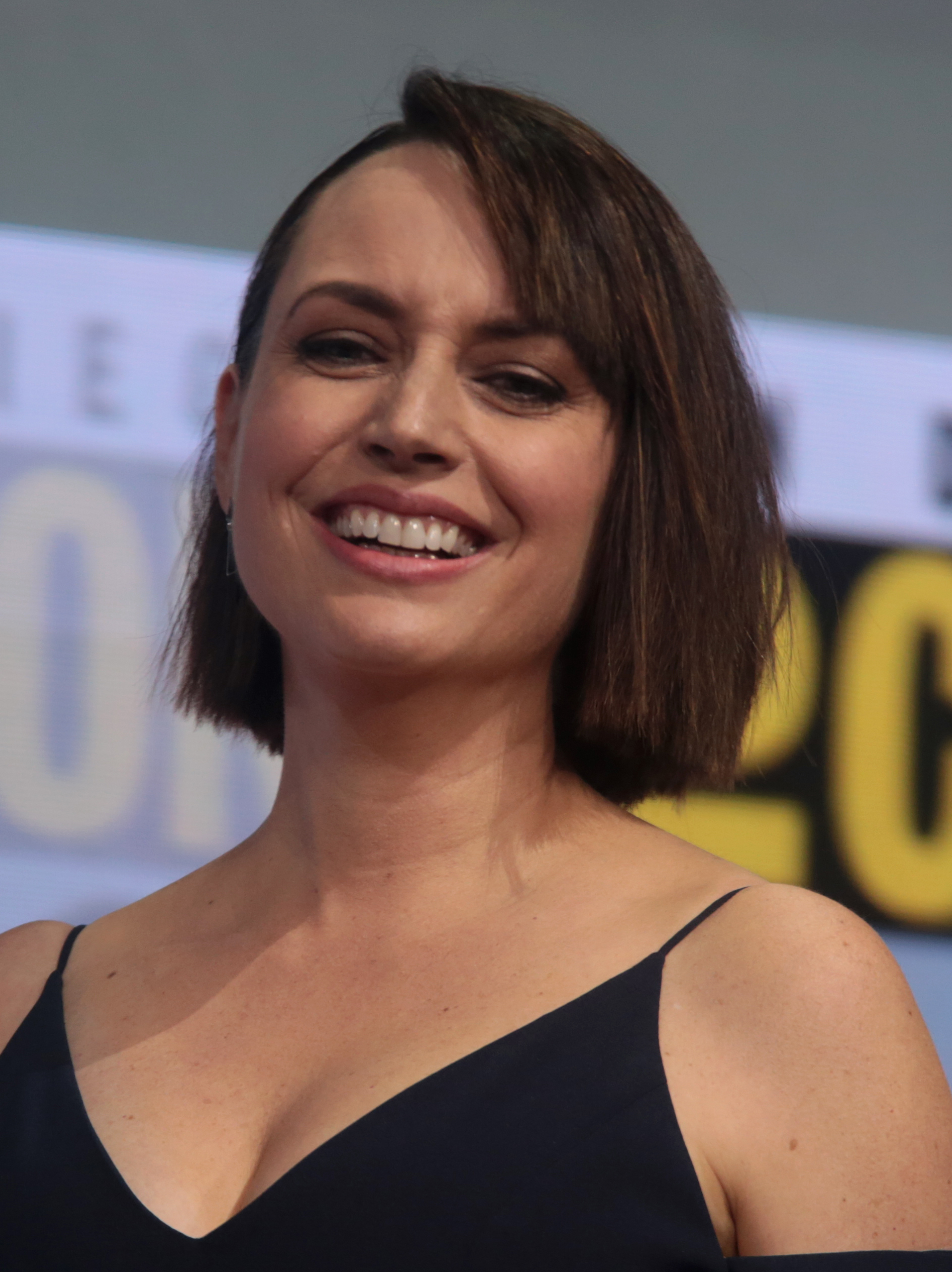
- Emery at the 2017 San Diego Comic-Con
- Born: Crossville, Tennessee, U.S.
- Occupation: Actress
- Years active: 1991–present
- Spouse: Kevin Earley

Julie Ann Emery is an American television and film actress. She has had roles in the television series Better Call Saul, Preacher, Five Days at Memorial, and Star Wars: Skeleton Crew. She has appeared in films such as Hitch and Gifted.

== Early life ==
Emery was born in Crossville, Tennessee. Her mother is Janice Fields. She graduated from Cumberland County High School in 1993 in Crossville then studied acting at the Webster Conservatory at Webster University in St. Louis, Missouri.

== Career ==
Emery began her career at the age of 16 and has appeared in several stage productions, such as A Funny Thing Happened on the Way to the Forum and Bye Bye Birdie. She has appeared in films and television series such as ER, CSI: Miami, Taken, Commander in Chief, Line of Fire, Hitch, Suits, Bosch, and Fargo. She played the recurring character Betsy Kettleman in the first and sixth seasons of Breaking Bad spin-off Better Call Saul. She reprised the role in a short film titled No Picnic.

In 2017, Emery joined the main cast for the second season of the television series Preacher, in the role of Sarah Featherstone.

== Personal life ==
Emery is married to actor Kevin Earley; they met while attending Webster Conservatory. She lives in Los Angeles, California. Emery enjoys hydroponics.

== Filmography ==
=== Film ===
Year	Title	Role	Notes
2002	Reality Check	Sal	
2005	Hitch	Casey Sedgewick	
2006	Gillery's Little Secret	Abbie	Short film
2008	Nothing but the Truth	Agent Boyd	
2008	The Rainbow Tribe	Lauren	
2008	House	Leslie Taylor	
2008	The Beneficiary	Beneficiary	Short film
2009	Redemption	Alexis	Short film
2011	The A Plate	Andrea Stevens	
2012	The History of Future Folk	Holly	
2012	The Letter	Doctor Lewis	
2013	Movie 43	Clare	Segment: "Homeschooled"
2014	Dakota's Summer	Annie Cayne	
2015	Seclusion	Lucy	Short film
2016	Falling Slowly	Maggie	Short film
2017	Gifted	Pat Golding	
2019	I Hate Kids	Joanna	
2019	3 Days with Dad	Susan	
2020	Walkaway Joe	Gina McCarthy	
2020	Teenage Badass	Rae Jaffe	
2025	Absolute Dominion	Diane Zimmer	
2026	Solo Mio	Heather	

=== Television ===
Year	Title	Role	Notes
2001–2003	ER	Niki Lumley	6 episodes
2002	The Drew Carey Show	Amy	Episode: "What Women Don't Want"
2002	First Monday	Leah Barnes	4 episodes
2002	Another Pretty Face	Libby Deco	Television film
2002	Providence	Winnie	Episode: "Truth and Consequences"
2002	Taken	Amelia Keys	Television mini-series
2003	CSI: Miami	Lynn Martell	Episode: "Dispo Day"
2003–2004	Line of Fire	FBI Agent Jennifer Sampson	13 episodes
2005	Alias	Nancy Cahill	Episode: "Nocturne"
2005	Commander in Chief	Joan Greer	5 episodes
2005	Snow Wonder	Stacey	Television film
2006	The Inside	Betty Scarwid	Episode: "Aidan"
2006	Ghost Whisperer	Dr. Penn Gorgan	Episode: "Cat's Claw"
2006	Bones	Janine O'Connell	Episode: "Aliens in a Spaceship"
2007–2008	October Road	Christine Cataldo	3 episodes
2007	Army Wives	Sarah Belgrad	Episode: "Independence Day"
2007	Pictures of Hollis Woods	Izzy Regan	Television film
2007–2008	The Riches	Georgia "GiGi" Panetta	4 episodes
2008	Dexter	Fiona Camp	Episode: "All in the Famiy"
2009	Cupid	Riley	Episode: "Live and Let Spy"
2009	Terminator: The Sarah Connor Chronicles	Nurse Hobson	Episode: "Some Must Watch While Some Must Sleep"
2009–2011	Then We Got Help!	Emily	20 episodes; also director and writer
2010	Royal Pains	Susie	Episode: "Medusa"
2011	Suits	Vanessa	2 episodes
2011	Damages	Tara Conway	2 episodes
2013	Perception	Susan Vetter	Episode: "Defective"
2014	NCIS	Erin Pace	Episode: "Kill Chain"
2014	Unforgettable	Shelby Delson	Episode: "Throwing Shade"
2014	Fargo	Ida Thurman	4 episodes
2015–2022	Better Call Saul	Betsy Kettleman	5 episodes
2015	Masters of Sex	Jo	2 episodes
2015	The Following	Nancy	Episode: "Flesh & Blood"
2016	Major Crimes	Det. Stephanie Dunn	Recurring role; 5 episodes
2016	NCIS: New Orleans	Karen Hardy	Episode: "Means to an End"
2016	Code Black	Debbie Kobling	Episode: "Second Year"
2016	Notorious	Laurie Parker	Episode: "Kept and Broken"
2017	The Mick	Karen	Episode: "The Sleepover"
2017	Christmas on the Coast	Dru Cassadine	Television film
2018, 2023	The Rookie	Stacy	"Pilot" & "The Con"
2017–2019	Preacher	Sarah Featherstone	33 episodes
2019	Catch-22	Marion Scheisskopf	3 episodes
2020–2021	Bosch	Agent Sylvia Reece	10 episodes
2021	Claws	Kim	Episode: "Chapter Three: Ambition"
2022	American Greed	Betsy Kettleman	Episode: "James McGill"
2022	Five Days at Memorial	Diane Robichaux	Television mini-series
2024	Star Wars: Skeleton Crew	Hotelier	2 episodes
2025	The Beast in Me	Lila Jarvis	
