= Some Kind of Wonderful (film) =

1987 American romantic drama film by Howard Deutch

- Theatrical release poster
- Directed by: Howard Deutch
- Written by: John Hughes
- Produced by: John Hughes
- Starring: Eric Stoltz; Mary Stuart Masterson; Craig Sheffer; Lea Thompson
- Cinematography: Jan Kiesser
- Edited by: Bud Smith
- Music by: Stephen Hague; John Musser
- Production company: Hughes Entertainment
- Distributed by: Paramount Pictures
- Release date: February 27, 1987
- Running time: 95 minutes
- Country: United States
- Language: English
- Box office: $18.5 million

Some Kind of Wonderful is a 1987 American teen romantic drama film directed by Howard Deutch and starring Eric Stoltz, Mary Stuart Masterson, and Lea Thompson. It is one of several successful teen dramas written by John Hughes in 1987. The film had its premiere in Hollywood on February 23, 1987, and widely released theatrically in the United States on February 27.

== Plot ==
The film is set against the strict social hierarchy of an American public high school in the San Pedro area of Los Angeles. Blue-collar mechanic and aspiring artist Keith Nelson is best friends with tomboy drummer Watts. Keith's father, Cliff, is obsessed with sending him to college for business, as he would be the first in their family to go.

Keith is enamored with Amanda Jones, one of the most popular girls in school, who is dating Hardy Jenns, a spoiled and selfish boy from a wealthy neighborhood. However, Amanda herself is not wealthy.

Keith gets himself in trouble to spend time with Amanda, but she talks her way out of it, and he is stuck with the school troublemakers, eventually making friends with Duncan (a cool punk rock youth).

Watts is dismissive of Keith's crush, until he begins dating Amanda, realizing she loves Keith.

Keith ultimately realizes he is in love with Watts and bids Amanda goodbye.

== Cast ==
- Eric Stoltz as Keith Nelson
- Mary Stuart Masterson as Watts
- Lea Thompson as Amanda Jones
- Craig Sheffer as Hardy Jenns
- John Ashton as Cliff Nelson
- Elias Koteas as Duncan
- Molly Hagan as Shayne
- Maddie Corman as Laura Nelson
- Jane Elliot as Carol Nelson
- Candace Cameron as Cindy Nelson
- Chynna Phillips as Mia
- Scott Coffey as Ray
- Carmine Caridi as Museum Guard
- Lee Garlington as Mrs. Albright

== Production ==
Deutch and Hughes were not happy with the ending of their previous collaboration Pretty in Pink (1986); in the script and the original cut of the film Andy (Molly Ringwald) wound up with her best friend Duckie (Jon Cryer). Test audiences disliked that ending, however, so a new ending was shot where Andy wound up with Blane (Andrew McCarthy).

With Some Kind of Wonderful, Hughes decided to re-tell the story, but with the sexes of the main characters switched. Hughes named the three main protagonists—Keith, Watts, and Amanda Jones—as an inside-joke tribute to the Rolling Stones (Keith Richards, Charlie Watts, and the Stones' song "Miss Amanda Jones", respectively). Hughes wanted Ringwald to play the female lead role of Watts, but she declined in order to pursue more adult roles; she also thought the character of Amanda seemed too similar to the character she played in The Breakfast Club. Hughes took this refusal personally, and it led to the end of Hughes's and Ringwald's working relationship.

Martha Coolidge was signed to direct Some Kind of Wonderful. Mary Stuart Masterson was cast as Watts. In addition to Masterson, Coolidge cast Eric Stoltz as Keith. Coolidge's vision of the film, which was darker than the eventual product, attracted Stoltz to the role. Unhappy with Coolidge, Hughes fired her and hired Deutch to direct. Original cast members Kim Delaney (Amanda Jones) and Kyle MacLachlan (Hardy Jenns) were fired shortly after. Deutch offered Lea Thompson the role of Amanda, but she initially turned him down. However, after the Thompson-starring Howard the Duck flopped at the box office, she accepted a second offer to take the role. Deutch and Thompson started dating after filming was completed, and they got married in 1989.

This film would have marked a third collaboration of both Eric Stoltz and Lea Thompson, the first being The Wild Life (1984), and the second being Back to the Future (1985), where both Stoltz and Thompson had been cast, but just five weeks into filming Back to the Future, Stoltz was let go from the production and replaced with Michael J. Fox, while Thompson stayed on. This film was shot in Los Angeles in the summer of 1986. Locations include San Pedro High School, Hancock Park, and the Hollywood Bowl.

== Reception ==
On Rotten Tomatoes the film has an approval rating of 76% based on 45 reviews, with the site's consensus: "Some Kind of Wonderful is above-average '80s teen fare for people who need as much John Hughes in their lives as possible." On Metacritic the film has a score of 55 out of 100 based on reviews from 16 critics, indicating "mixed or average reviews". Audiences surveyed by CinemaScore gave the film a grade A− on a scale of A to F.

Roger Ebert of the Chicago Sun-Times praised the film, giving it 3 stars out of four and wrote how he admired its clever re-examination of a common film trope: the film "is not about whether the hero will get the girl. It is about whether the hero should get the girl, and when was the last time you saw a movie that even knew that could be the question?" Janet Maslin of The New York Times stated that Some Kind of Wonderful is the "much-improved, recycled version of the Pretty in Pink story". Richard Schickel of Time criticized the film for being unrealistic. Masterson's look and performance were singled out for praise by several critics. The film grossed $18.5 million at the box office.

== Accolades ==
- Young Artist Awards: Best Young Actress in a Motion Picture - Drama: Lea Thompson (1987) - Won

== Soundtrack ==
Some Kind of Wonderful: Music from the Motion Picture Soundtrack

Soundtrack album by various artists
- Released: February 27, 1987
- Genres: Rock, new wave
- Length: 36:20
- Label: MCA

Professional ratings
Review scores
Source	Rating
AllMusic	4/5 stars

1. "Do Anything" – Pete Shelley
2. "Brilliant Mind" – Furniture
3. "Cry Like This" – Blue Room
4. "I Go Crazy" – Flesh for Lulu
5. "She Loves Me" – Stephen Duffy
6. "The Hardest Walk" – The Jesus and Mary Chain
7. "The Shyest Time" – The Apartments
8. "Miss Amanda Jones" – The March Violets
9. "Can't Help Falling in Love" – Lick the Tins
10. "Turn to the Sky" – The March Violets

=== Charts ===
Chart (1987)	Peak position
Australia (Kent Music Report)	96
