= Howard Deutch =

American film and television director (born 1950)

- Born: Howard Roy Deutch; September 14, 1950 (age 75); New York City, U.S.
- Occupations: Director, producer
- Years active: 1986–present
- Spouse: Lea Thompson (m. 1989)
- Children: Madelyn; Zoey
- Relatives: Robert Walden (uncle)

Howard Roy Deutch (born September 14, 1950) is an American film and television director who worked with filmmaker John Hughes, directing two of Hughes's best-known screenplays, Pretty in Pink and Some Kind of Wonderful. Since 2011, he has primarily directed television productions, including multiple episodes of Getting On and True Blood.

== Early life and career ==
Deutch was born in New York City. His parents were Pamela (née Wolkowitz) and Murray Deutch, a music executive and publisher. His uncle is actor Robert Walden (who is his mother's brother). Deutch was raised in a Jewish family. He graduated from George W. Hewlett High School and attended Ohio State University. He began his career in the advertising department of United Artists Records, where his father was company president. Deutch directed music videos for performers such as Billy Idol ("Flesh for Fantasy") and Billy Joel ("Keeping the Faith"). Deutch's feature-length directorial debut was the John Hughes-penned Brat Pack film Pretty in Pink. His next two directorial efforts were also written by Hughes: Some Kind of Wonderful and The Great Outdoors.

Deutch has directed three sequel films: Grumpier Old Men, The Odd Couple II, and The Whole Ten Yards. During a hiatus from features, he directed episodic television, including two installments of Tales from the Crypt and the pilot episode of Melrose Place.

Deutch directed his wife in four episodes of Caroline in the City, and his daughter Zoey in one episode of Ringer.

In 2022, Deutch directed the Lifetime TV film Buried in Barstow.

== Personal life ==
Deutch met his wife, actress Lea Thompson, during the filming of Some Kind of Wonderful; she was also featured in Article 99, his first feature venture without Hughes. They have two daughters, Madelyn Deutch and Zoey Deutch, both of whom are actresses.

Deutch teaches the Saturday advanced acting and directing class at the Beverly Hills Playhouse.

== Awards ==
- Nominated for DGA Award Outstanding Directorial Achievement in Movies for Television in 2003 for Gleason (2002)
- Earned a CableACE Award for his direction of an episode of the HBO series Tales From the Crypt entitled Dead Right.

== Filmography ==
Film

- 1986: Pretty in Pink
- 1987: Some Kind of Wonderful
- 1988: The Great Outdoors
- 1992: Article 99
- 1994: Getting Even with Dad
- 1995: Grumpier Old Men
- 1998: The Odd Couple II
- 2000: The Replacements
- 2004: The Whole Ten Yards
- 2008: My Best Friend's Girl

TV series

- 1989–1990: Tales from the Crypt
- 1992: Melrose Place
- 1995–1998: Caroline in the City
- 2002: Watching Ellie
- 2011: Life Unexpected
- 2011: Big Love
- 2011: Hung
- 2012: Ringer
- 2012–2013: Warehouse 13
- 2012: Emily Owens M.D.
- 2013: CSI: NY
- 2013: American Horror Story: Coven
- 2013: Getting On
- 2013–2014: True Blood
- 2014: American Horror Story: Freak Show
- 2015–2016: Jane the Virgin
- 2015–2016: CSI: Cyber
- 2015: The Lizzie Borden Chronicles
- 2015: The Strain
- 2016–2017: Outcast
- 2017–2018: Empire
- 2017: Claws
- 2017–2020: Young Sheldon
- 2019: Proven Innocent
- 2019: BH90210
- 2020: Filthy Rich
- 2023–2026: Will Trent

TV movies

- 2002: Gleason
- 2022: Buried in Barstow
