= Robert Walden =

American actor (born 1943)

- Born: Robert Wolkowitz; September 25, 1943 (age 83); New York City, New York, U.S.
- Occupation: Actor
- Years active: 1970–present
- Relatives: Howard Deutch (nephew); Madelyn Deutch (grand-niece); Zoey Deutch (grand-niece)

Robert Walden (born Robert Wolkowitz; September 25, 1943) is an American television and motion picture actor. He is best known for his role as Joe Rossi on Lou Grant, which earned him three nominations for Primetime Emmy Awards for Outstanding Supporting Actor in a Drama Series; for his role as Joe Waters on Brothers; and as Glenn Newman on Happily Divorced. Walden also had roles in the films Blue Sunshine, The Hospital, All the President's Men, Audrey Rose, and Capricorn One.

== Life and career ==
Walden was born in New York City, the son of Hilda and Max Wolkowitz. His nephew is director Howard Deutch, the son of his sister; and his grand-nieces are actresses Zoey Deutch and Madelyn Deutch. Walden first became interested in acting while attending City College of New York, and shortly thereafter became a member of the Actors Studio.

Walden's film career began in 1970, in Bloody Mama for Roger Corman. After that, and for the first several years of his career, he often played young doctors, such as in the television series The New Doctors (one of the rotating elements of NBC's The Bold Ones) as Dr. Cohen, after the departure of John Saxon prior to the final season; and notably in films Blue Sunshine and Paddy Chayefsky's The Hospital. His breakthrough role was in the television series Lou Grant, on which he played journalist Joe Rossi. MTM producers James L. Brooks and Allan Burns "discovered" Walden when he played the role of police officer Ernie Joyce on the Mary Tyler Moore spin-off show Rhoda in an episode that aired in January 1977. In a 2017 interview, Walden said that the MTM producers created the new Mary Tyler Moore spin-off Lou Grant with Walden in mind for the role of Rossi. He was a cast member on Lou Grant during its entire run (1977–1982), and received three Emmy Award nominations (in 1979, 1980 and 1981) for Outstanding Supporting Actor in a Drama Series for the role. Walden has played several historical characters, including Donald Segretti in the 1976 film All the President's Men, and J. Robert Oppenheimer in the 1980 TV movie Enola Gay: The Men, the Mission, the Atomic Bomb. From 1984 until 1989, he starred in the groundbreaking Showtime sitcom Brothers as the middle of three brothers, the owner of a bar/restaurant who was a retired NFL placekicker. His youngest brother, played by Paul Regina, was gay and the series dealt with issues regarding homosexuality. Walden also made a cameo appearance as a sound engineer in the 1994 film Radioland Murders.

In 2011, Walden made a return to series television in the TV Land sitcom Happily Divorced, playing Glenn Newman, the father of the lead character played by series creator and writer Fran Drescher, with Rita Moreno co-starring as his wife. As on his previous series Brothers, Happily Divorced is also predominantly gay-themed, as the plot is based on Drescher's divorce from series co-creator Peter Marc Jacobson, who later revealed he was gay and remained friends with Drescher. The series was cancelled in 2013 after two seasons.

=== Other work ===
He was a member of the Doo Wop group Bobby & The Chord-A-Roys in 1960.

Walden is a distinguished teacher of acting at The New School for Drama, division of the New York City university The New School. In August, 2006 he appeared in the Herbert Berghof Playwrights Foundation (HB Studio) production of Arthur Miller's The American Clock under the direction of Austin Pendleton. Walden also appeared in the movie Capricorn One (1978) as Elliot Whitter.

== Selected filmography ==
Year	Title	Role	Notes
1970	Bloody Mama	Fred Barker	
1970	The Out-of-Towners	Looter	
1970	The Sidelong Glances of a Pigeon Kicker	Winslow Smith	
1971	The Hospital	Dr. Brubaker	
1972	A Run for the Money	Murdock	
1972	Bobby Jo and the Big Apple Good Time Band	Augie	Unsold TV pilot
1972	Rage	Dr. Tom Janeway	
1972	Everything You Always Wanted to Know About Sex	Sperm	
1973	The Rookies	Joey	S2.E2 - "Margin for Error"
1973	Columbo	Billy Fine	Episode S3.E2 - "Any Old Port in a Storm"
1973	Maxie	Finn	
1973	Shirts/Skins	Dick Dubin	ABC Movie of the Week
1974	Larry	Tom Corman	
1974	The Great Ice Rip-Off	Checker	ABC Movie of the Week
1974	Our Time	Frank	
1974	Panic on the 5:22	Eddie Chiario	ABC Movie of the Week
1974–75	Medical Center	Dr. Frank Corelli	3 episodes
1975	The Kansas City Massacre	Adam Richetti	TV movie
1975	Kate McShane	Vogel	Episode S1.E2 - "Terror on Sycamore Street"
1976	Starsky & Hutch	Marty Simon	Episode S2.E3 - "Murder at Sea"
1976	All the President's Men	Donald Segretti	
1976	The Rockford Files	Barry Silverstein	Episode S3.E2 - "The Oracle Wore a Cashmere Suit"
1976	The Blue Knight	Joey	Episode S2.E10 - "Death Echo"
1976	Police Woman	Spider Denton	Episode S3.E5 - "Broken Angels"
1977	Audrey Rose	Brice Mack	
1977	Blue Sunshine	David Blume	
1977	Capricorn One	Elliot Whitter	
1977	Police Story	Investigator Lou Bleyer	Episode S4.E13 - "Spitfire"
1977	Rhoda	Ernie Joyce	Episode S3.E17 - "Somebody Has to Say They're Sorry"
1977	Hunter	Bellheimer	Episode S1.E13 - "U.F.M. 13"
1978	Centennial	Dr. Richard Butler	Episode S1.E1 - "Only the Rocks Live Forever"
1980	Enola Gay: The Men, the Mission, the Atomic Bomb	Robert Oppenheimer	TV movie
1983	Memorial Day	Gibbs	TV film
1985	Murder, She Wrote	Lt. Antonelli	Episode S2.E3 - "Murder in the Afternoon"
1987	Matlock	Roger Bundy	Episode S1.E17 - "The Convict"
1987	Perry Mason: The Case of the Lost Love	Robert Lane	TV Movie
1988	Hotel	Tom Conners	Episode S5.E17 - "Aftershocks"
1989	Father Dowling Mysteries	Vincent Tillman	Episode S1.E1 - "The Missing Body Mystery"
1992	Reasonable Doubts	Joe McMann	Episode S1.E20 - "Home to Roost"
1994	Radioland Murders	Tommy	
1997	In Dark Places	Diller	
1997	Pacific Blue	Carl Regis	Episode S3.E6 - "Sandman"
1998	Heist	Police Detective	
1998	Kiss of a Stranger	Stephen Block	
1999	Desert Thunder	Gen. Tom Brockton	
2000	Judging Amy	Ian Tyson	Episode S1.E15 - "Culture Clash"
2001	The Fluffer	Herman Lasky	
2001	The West Wing	Senator Rossiter	Episode S2.E21 - "18th and Potomac"
2002	Time of Fear	Sheriff Joe Calabro	
2005	Whiskey School	Alex Cavanaugh	
2005	Law & Order: Special Victims Unit	William Dorsey	Episode S7.E1 - "Demons"
2007	Mattie Fresno and the Holoflux Universe	Dr. Kubelkoff	
2010	Trooper	VA Doctor	
2020	Surviving in L.A.	Walter	
2023	Love & Death	Dr. Irving Stone	2 episodes

== Television series ==
Year	Title	Role	Notes
1972–73	The Bold Ones: The New Doctors	Dr. Martin Cohen	15 episodes
1977–82	Lou Grant	Joe Rossi	114 episodes
1984–89	Brothers	Joe Waters	115 episodes
2011–13	Happily Divorced	Glen Newman	34 episodes
