= Wasted Youth (British band) =

British punk rock band

Background information
- Origin: London, England
- Genres: Post-punk
- Years active: 1979–1982, 2021-present
- Label: Bridgehouse Records
- Members: Ken Scott; Rocco Barker; Alan Temple; Josef Rosam; Sabrina Amade
- Past members: Ray Hanson; Teresa Casella; Nick Nicole; Darren Murphy; Andy Scott; Mick Atkins

Wasted Youth are an English post-punk band from London, initially active between 1979 and 1982. The original line-up of the band was Ken Scott (vocals and guitar), Rocco Barker (guitar), Nick Nicole (synth), Darren Murphy (bass) and Andy Scott (drums).

Rocco Barker later went on to join the band Flesh for Lulu. Andy Scott joined Cockney Rejects.

Darren Murphy died of cancer in February 2012. Andy Scott died of cancer in May 2020.

Rarely mentioned, if at all, in the era’s music history books, they were heavily influenced by the dark narcotic glamour of the Velvet Underground, the Doors, the Stooges and Transformer-era Lou Reed. Peter Perrett (The Only Ones) produced them, as did Martin Hannett (Joy Division).

They were hugely popular as the Eighties dawned with punks looking for something more sexy and sophisticated and looked set to become much more than the cult band they became. They pre-dated Post Punk and Goth and are still remembered as quietly-influential and a superb live band by fans.

Wasted Youth were indie chart regulars in the early 80s post-punk scene, touring with The Only Ones, Psychedelic Furs, Robert Palmer, Classix Nouveau and Modern English. Their 1981 album ‘Wild and Wandering’ is widely considered to be an overlooked classic which has sold in excess of 25,000 copies in its lifetime. Post-Punk, Pre-Goth, New Psychedelia, take your pick, they weren’t tied to any fashion or genre of the day, which gave their music a timeless quality.

Having split at the end of 1982, the band returned in February 2022, still featuring original members Ken Scott and Rocco Barker (also ex-Flesh For Lulu), initially for a couple of low-key gigs, but when tickets sold-out within minutes of going on sale, it became clear that there was still a demand for Wasted Youth and their brand of controlled chaos, pulsating rhythms and beautiful stories from the darker side of life.

Joined by younger recruits Josef Rosam (Gtr), Sabrina Amade (Bass) and Alan Temple (Drums), they have been touring the UK playing a string of well-received shows, including dates with the Psychedelic Furs, Pop Will Eat Itself and festivals such as Wide Awake and Rebellion.

Their long awaited album Neo Noir was recorded over several sessions between June 2024 to January 2025 in West Eleven Recording Studio produced by Ken Scott and engineered by Kevin Harris.

Whilst paying respect and having great love for the ‘old’ Wasted Youth, the ‘new’ Wasted Youth are not a nostalgia act, and are eager to prove that they have something new to offer, both visually and sonically.

== Discography ==
=== Singles ===
	Year	Title	UK Indie Chart Position
January	1980	"Jealousy"	23
July	1980	"I'll Remember You"	19
	1980	"My Friends Are Dead" EP	–
May	1981	"Rebecca's Room"	15
May	1982	"Wildlife"	21
September	1982	"Reach Out"	42
December	1982	"(Do the) Caveman"	–

=== Albums ===
	Year	Title	UK Indie Chart Position
December	1981	Wild and Wandering	9
	1982	Live	–
May	1983	Beginning of the End	13
		From the Inner Depth	–
	2006	Memorialize (Singles '79-'82)	–
