= Go Crazy =

Go Crazy may refer to:

- Go Crazy! (album), a 2014 album by 2PM
- "Go Crazy!" (song), a 2014 song by 2PM
- "Go Crazy" (Chris Brown and Young Thug song), 2020
- "Go Crazy" (Young Jeezy song), 2005
- "Go Crazy", a song by Fat Joe from Plata O Plomo
- "Go Crazy", a song by Megan Thee Stallion featuring Big Sean and 2 Chainz from Good News
- "Go Crazy", an episode of My Sister Sam

== See also ==
- I Go Crazy (disambiguation)
- "Let's Go Crazy", a 1984 song by Prince and The Revolution
