= Vincent N Roxxy =

- Theatrical release poster
- Directed by: Gary Michael Schultz
- Screenplay by: Gary Michael Schultz
- Story by: Gary Michael Schultz
- Produced by: Keith Kjarval
- Starring: Emile Hirsch; Zoë Kravitz; Emory Cohen; Zoey Deutch; Beau Knapp; Jason Mitchell; Kid Cudi
- Cinematography: Alex Disenhof
- Edited by: Bruce Cannon
- Music by: Questlove
- Production companies: Unified Pictures; Bron Capital Partners
- Distributed by: Vertical Entertainment
- Release dates: April 18, 2016 (Tribeca Film Festival); June 2, 2017 (United States)
- Running time: 102 minutes
- Country: United States
- Language: English

Vincent N Roxxy is a 2016 American action crime-thriller film directed and written by Gary Michael Schultz. It stars Emile Hirsch and Zoë Kravitz as the title characters, alongside Emory Cohen, Zoey Deutch, and Kid Cudi. Principal photography began in December 2014 in Louisiana, and wrapped in January 2015. The film was released on June 2, 2017, by Vertical Entertainment.

== Plot ==
Vincent, a small town loner, contemplates delivering a black duffle bag full of money to a gang leader. On his way home he encounters Roxxy, a young woman, being forced out of her car and hit repeatedly by a man. Vincent hits the man and the two flee together before the police arrive. Vincent offers Roxxy a place to stay in a small trailer behind his family's farm house but she declines. Vincent then arrives home to a party his brother, JC, and girlfriend Kate are throwing. This is the first time Vincent has returned home for a couple years.

JC shows Vincent an abandoned farm house he plans to turn into an auto repair shop and asks him to help. Vincent declines, but later agrees to help. The next day Roxxy shows and takes up Vincent on his offer to stay in his trailer. JC is reluctant to have Roxxy staying with them, suspecting she may be involved in some trouble. However, Vincent, Roxxy, JC and Kate grow to be friends and Kate manages to get Roxxy a job at a bar she works at as a bartender.

Kate's ex-boyfriend, Darryl, turns up and makes several advances towards her. This leads to JC stepping in, which results in Darryl and his friends being kicked out of the bar. Roxxy and Vincent grow closer and JC teases Vincent he is falling in love. One night JC and Kate find the windows of their truck shot up by a pellet gun. JC learns that Darryl and his friends are responsible and retaliates by pouring bleach into his truck's fuel tank.

Vincent and Roxxy's relationship blossoms as they make love for the first time. The next morning Vincent is awoken at gunpoint by Roxxy, demanding answers after she finds a piece of paper with her deceased brother's address on it. Roxxy ends her relationship with Vincent and plans on leaving but Kate convinces her to stay. The following day Vincent and JC argue over JC's turbulent past: Vincent left town after his mother died but he nursed her for the previous three years when she was sick. He left because his brother showed up at the end.

One night Darryl and his friends beat up JC. Vincent finds Darryl and brutally attacks him and his friends before taking Darryl's hand and crushing it with the car door repeatedly. He points a gun at Darryl's head and threatens to kill him. Later that night Vincent visits Roxxy and attempts to reconcile unsuccessfully. She says violence will always follow them everywhere.

One afternoon Vincent spots a parked car observing him. It speeds off before he can see who it is. Realising it's the same men who were after Roxxy, he rushes back home to find the car parked on the driveway. Vincent takes out a gun after hearing screaming. He finds Roxxy, JC and Kate tied up and gagged on the ground surrounded by two men and their leader, Suga. Vincent is shot in the shoulder and collapses on the floor. A horrified Roxxy watches as the men prepare to hang Vincent. Suga demands Roxxy tell him where the money her brother owed him is. Unable to provide answers, Suga orders his henchman Culture to shoot Kate and JC in the head, killing them both. After Roxxy is taken inside, Vincent is left to die. However, the noose snaps and Vincent crawls into the house. He stabs henchman Rudy in the neck and fatally beats Culture. Vincent manages to tell Roxxy about the black duffle bag being buried in the drive-in before dying in her arms.

The next day Roxxy goes to the drive-in and finds a carving Vincent made: "V n R" with a heart shape. Roxxy then retrieves the bag with the money that her brother owed and a letter from Vincent explaining how he was ashamed of taking it as it was blood money. He tells her to leave town and take the money to start her life over, and ends by hoping that one day she can forgive him.

That night Roxxy leaves town in Vincent's car in pursuit of Suga and his men in Atlanta. She spots them leaving a club and follows them to a house party. Upon arriving she successfully murders all of Suga's henchmen. Roxxy then enters Suga's room in a fit of rage. Suga fires back and Roxxy is hit by flying shrapnel. A fight ensues between the two until she's overpowered and Suga prepares to kill her. She says she has his money. With Suga distracted, Roxxy pulls out two knives and stabs Suga in his eyes. Suga attempts to shoot Roxxy but fails. Roxxy shoots Suga several times in the head. Roxxy limps out of the house covered in blood and drives off in Vincent's car shortly before the police arrive.

== Cast ==
- Emile Hirsch as Vincent
- Zoë Kravitz as Roxxy
- Emory Cohen as J.C.
- Zoey Deutch as Kate
- Kid Cudi as "Suga"
- Beau Knapp as Darryl
- Jason Mitchell as Cordell

Appearing as Suga's men are Dominic Alexander as Jayden, Sheldon Frett as Rudy, Joey Bicicchi as "Culture", and Hakim Callender as Andre.

== Production ==
In April 2014 Anton Yelchin and Megalyn Echikunwoke were attached to star in the crime thriller Vincent-N-Roxxy to be directed by Gary Michael Schultz based on his own script. On 29 October 2014 both stars were replaced by Emile Hirsch and Zoë Kravitz, while Keith Kjarval was attached to produce the film through Unified Pictures, which also developed the film.

Principal photography on the film began in December 2014 in Louisiana, and wrapped in January 2015.

== Release ==
The film premiered at the Tribeca Film Festival on 18 April 2016. The film was released on 2 June 2017 by Vertical Entertainment.
