= Going Crazy =

Going Crazy may refer to:

- "Going Crazy" (Song Ji-eun song), 2011
- "Goin' Crazy" (Dizzee Rascal song), 2013
- "Goin' Crazy" (Natalie song), 2005
- "Goin’ Crazy", a song by Ashley Tisdale from Headstrong
- "Goin' Crazy!", a song by David Lee Roth from Eat 'Em and Smile
- "Going Crazy", a song by Exo from The War
- "Going Grazy", a song by The Haircuts from a sketch on Your Show of Shows
- "Going Crazy", a song by Lee Hyori from Monochrome
- "Going Crazy", a song by Teen Top from It's
- "Going Crazy", a song by Kan Mi-youn
- "Going Crazy", a song by Twice from The Story Begins
- "Going Crazy", a 2016 song by Hardwell and Blasterjaxx

== See also ==
- I Go Crazy (disambiguation)
- I'm Going Crazy, a Smashing Pumpkins song
- Am I Going Crazy, a Korn song
