= Teenage Badass =

2020 American comedy film

- Directed by: Grant McCord
- Written by: Matthew Dho; Grant McCord
- Produced by: Chuckie Duff; Anthony A. DiMaria; Jeff Dykhuizen; Mcabe Gregg; Grant McCord; Matthew Dho
- Starring: Mcabe Gregg; Evan Ultra; Madelyn Deutch; Dillon Lane; Elsie Hewitt; Tucker Audie; Brandon "crsh." White
- Cinematography: Andric Queen-Booker
- Music by: Bob Hoag
- Production companies: Common Wall Media; Hot Juice Films
- Distributed by: Freestyle Digital Media
- Release date: September 18, 2020
- Running time: 99 minutes
- Country: United States
- Language: English

Teenage Badass is a 2020 American coming-of-age comedy film, written by Matthew Dho and Grant McCord, and directed by Grant McCord. It stars Mcabe Gregg, Evan Ultra, Madelyn Deutch, Dillon Lane, Elsie Hewitt, Tucker Audie, and Brandon "crsh." White, with Karsen Liotta, Kevin Corrigan, and Julie Ann Emery.

== Plot ==
Teenage Badass tells the story of the rise of a fictional indie rock band named Stylo and the Murder Dogs. Set in 2006, we follow Brad (Mcabe Gregg), a teenage drummer who dreams of making it big in a rock band. Brad and his single-mother Rae (Julie Ann Emery) struggle to get by as Brad refuses to give up. On a fluke, Brad joins a new band fronted by singer/songwriter Kirk Stylo. They land a shot to play on a local news show. With the town buzzing from their performance, Brad's dreams inch closer when they're asked to record with Jordan (Kevin Corrigan), a legendary local producer. Just as everything seems to be falling into place, a series of chaotic events threaten everything.

== Cast ==
- Mcabe Gregg as Brad Jaffe
- Evan Ultra as Kirk Stylo
- Madelyn Deutch as Candice White
- Dillon Lane as Albert Fisk
- Elsie Hewitt as Melanie
- Tucker Audie as Mark Steib
- Brandon "crsh." White as Horus Slays
- Karsen Liotta as Tiffany
- Kevin Corrigan as Jordan
- Julie Ann Emery as Rae Jaffe
- James Paxton as Shan
- Bryan McGowan as Everett
- Jim Adkins as himself
- Kane Ritchotte as Ritner

== Production ==
In February 2019, the film was announced to be currently filming principal photography with Mcabe Gregg, Madelyn Deutch, Dillon Lane, Elsie Hewitt, Kane Ritchotte, Julie Ann Emery, Karsen Liotta, and James Paxton as cast and Grant McCord directing from a screenplay he wrote with Matthew Dho. Chuckie Duff served as executive producer under his Common Wall Media production company with Jeff Dykhuizen and Anthony DiMaria producing.

== Release ==
The film was originally slated to have its world premiere at South by Southwest on March 16, 2020. The actual screening of the film on its slated date never transpired when South by Southwest 2020 was canceled on March 6, 2020, due to the COVID-19 pandemic, the result of an order by the city of Austin. The city's Mayor Steve Adler announced the cancellation of the 2020 SXSW while declaring a local state of emergency.

The film was also set to screen at the Phoenix Film Festival on March 26, 2020, and the RiverRun International Film Festival on March 28, 2020, however both events were cancelled as a result of the COVID-19 pandemic.

Freestyle Digital Media is set to release the film on through video-on-demand on September 18, 2020.

== Awards and nominations ==
Award	Date of ceremony	Category	Recipient	Result
RiverRun International Film Festival	2020	Best Actor – Re:vision Independent Feature Competition	Mcabe Gregg	Won
