= Flesh for Lulu =

English rock band

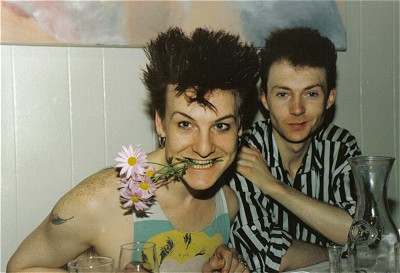
- Nick Marsh and Kevin Mills of Flesh for Lulu during a dinner interview in San Francisco, 1987

Background information
- Origin: Brixton, London, England
- Genres: Pop rock; gothic rock; post-punk
- Years active: 1982–1992, 2007–2009, 2013–2015
- Labels: Polydor; Beggars Banquet; Capitol; Hybrid
- Past members: Nick Marsh; Rocco Barker; James Mitchell; Kevin Mills; Derek "Del Strangefish" Greening; Will Crewdson; Mark Bishop; Keith McAndrew; Glen Bishop; Mike Steed; Hans Persson; John Bartel; Philip Ames; Justin Brooks ('Justine')
- Website: Official website

Flesh for Lulu were an English rock band formed in Brixton, London, England, active between 1982 and 1992. They reformed from 2013 to 2015 with a new lineup. Initially part of the post-punk scene, the band's sound shifted to reflect influences from pop music, country and western, rhythm and blues and blues.

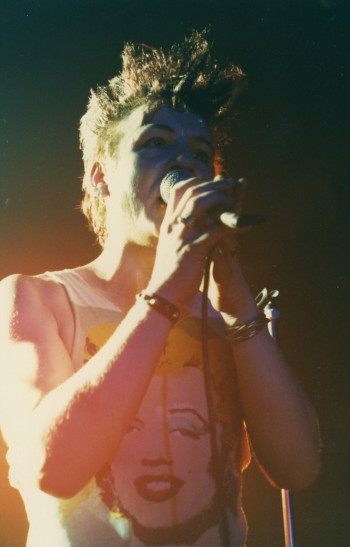
Nick Marsh onstage in San Francisco, 1987

== History ==
Nick Marsh (vocals and guitar) and James Mitchell (drums), along with Justin Brooks, formed the band, and recruited bassist Philip Ames from an ad in Melody Maker. Brooks left, and was replaced by Mark Ambler. This line up recorded the band's only John Peel session, which was well received enough to earn them a contract with Polydor Records in 1983. After Ames and Ambler left, Rocco Barker (originally from Wasted Youth, guitar and vocals), and Glen Bishop (bass) were recruited. They took their name from an American film.. Soon thereafter, bassist Glen Bishop left to join Under Two Flags, and was replaced by Kevin Mills (formerly of Specimen).

Their first EP, "Roman Candle", did well, but the label dropped them a year later after their eponymous first album failed to find any commercial success.

In 1985, the band signed to Hybrid Records and released the mini LP Blue Sisters Swing, which was produced with Craig Leon. The cover image of two nuns kissing resulted in the album being banned in the United States and Europe. Flesh for Lulu then joined Statik Records, which released Big Fun City later that year.

The following year, the band signed to Beggars Banquet Records, and their song "I Go Crazy" was featured in Some Kind of Wonderful and received some airplay on American college rock radio stations. This allowed Flesh for Lulu to undertake a tour of the US.

In 1989, "Decline and Fall" followed and became a top 15 hit on the new Modern Rock Tracks chart. The next year, "Time and Space" written by newest member Del Strangefish (ex-Peter and the Test Tube Babies guitarist) became their biggest U.S. hit, reaching the top 10 of the Modern Rock chart, but the song failed to chart on any other U.S. chart. After Capitol Records dropped the band, a record deal with Hollywood Records fell through. The band disbanded soon after with singer Nick Marsh stating, "The reason Flesh really split up is because there wasn't a definite...to coin the oldest cliché of them all, there were musical differences. That's true, there were two separate trains of thought."

The song "Postcards from Paradise" was covered by Paul Westerberg as a secret bonus track on his 2002 album Stereo. The Goo Goo Dolls also covered the same song, which is part of a "deluxe edition" release of their 2010 album Something for the Rest of Us available on the band's website.

== Gigantic ==
In 1996, Nick Marsh and Rocco Barker formed a band they named Gigantic, recruiting Dave Blair on bass and Al Fletcher on drums. Columbia Records signed them, and put them on tour with the Goo Goo Dolls and Bush. Their first album was a commercial flop, and the group disbanded in 1998.

After the breakup of Gigantic, Nick Marsh released a solo album and performed with the bourbon-soaked gypsy bop and stroll band Urban Voodoo Machine. Rocco Barker joined a band named The Space Police with reggae/jungle artist General Levy and Italian keyboardist and producer Dr. Cat (aka Luca Gatti).

In 2007, Gigantic's only album Disenchanted, originally released in 1996 on Columbia Records, was repackaged and reissued on Corporate Risk as Gigantic under the Flesh for Lulu name. A single titled "Phenomenal" was released in 1997, but the track did not appear on the 1996 album.

Rocco was featured on the Channel 4 series A Place in Spain: Costa Chaos (2008).

== Reformation and death of Nick Marsh ==
In 2013, Nick Marsh reformed Flesh for Lulu with a new line-up consisting of Marsh (vocals/guitar), Mark Bishop (drums), Keith McAndrew (bass) and Will Crewdson (guitar).

Marsh died on 5 June 2015 from cancer, aged 53.

== Discography ==
=== Studio albums ===
- Flesh for Lulu (1984, Polydor)
- Big Fun City (1985, Statik)
- Long Live the New Flesh (1987, Beggars Banquet UK, Capitol US)
- Plastic Fantastic (1989, Beggars Banquet UK, Capitol US)
- Gigantic (2007) (Gigantic's 1996 Disenchanted album reissued under Flesh for Lulu name)
- The Best of Flesh for Lulu [Re-Recorded] (2009, Corporate-Risk Products)

=== Extended plays ===
- Roman Candle (1983, Polydor)
- Blue Sisters Swing (1985, Hybrid)
- Idol (1986, Beggars Banquet)

=== Live album ===
- Fresh Flesh (1986, Dojo)

=== Singles ===
Year	Single	Peak chart positions			Album
		UK	US Dance	US Alternative	
1983	"Roman Candle"	100	–	–	Non-album single
1984	"Restless"	–	–	–	Flesh for Lulu (debut)
1984	"Subterraneans"	–	–	–	Flesh for Lulu (debut)
1985	"Baby Hurricane"	–	–	–	Big Fun City
1985	"Seven Hail Marys" (Spain only release)	–	–	–	Big Fun City
1986	"Idol"	–	–	–	Non-album single
1987	"Postcards from Paradise"	–	34	–	Long Live the New Flesh
1987	"Siamese Twist"	–	–	–	Long Live the New Flesh
1988	"I Go Crazy"	–	–	96	Long Live the New Flesh
1989	"Decline and Fall"	–	–	15	Plastic Fantastic
1989	"Every Little Word"	–	14	–	Plastic Fantastic
1990	"Time and Space"	–	–	9	Plastic Fantastic
1991	"She Was"	–	–	9	Non-album single

=== Compilation appearances ===
- Nintendo: White Knuckle Scorin' (1991) "She Was"

=== Soundtrack appearances ===
- Some Kind of Wonderful (1987) "I Go Crazy"
- Uncle Buck (1989) "Slide", "Slowdown" (only used in film)
- Flashback (1990) "Next Time (I'll Dream of You)"
- The Next Karate Kid (1994) "Mystic Trader" (only used in film)
