= Zoey Deutch =

American actress (born 1994)

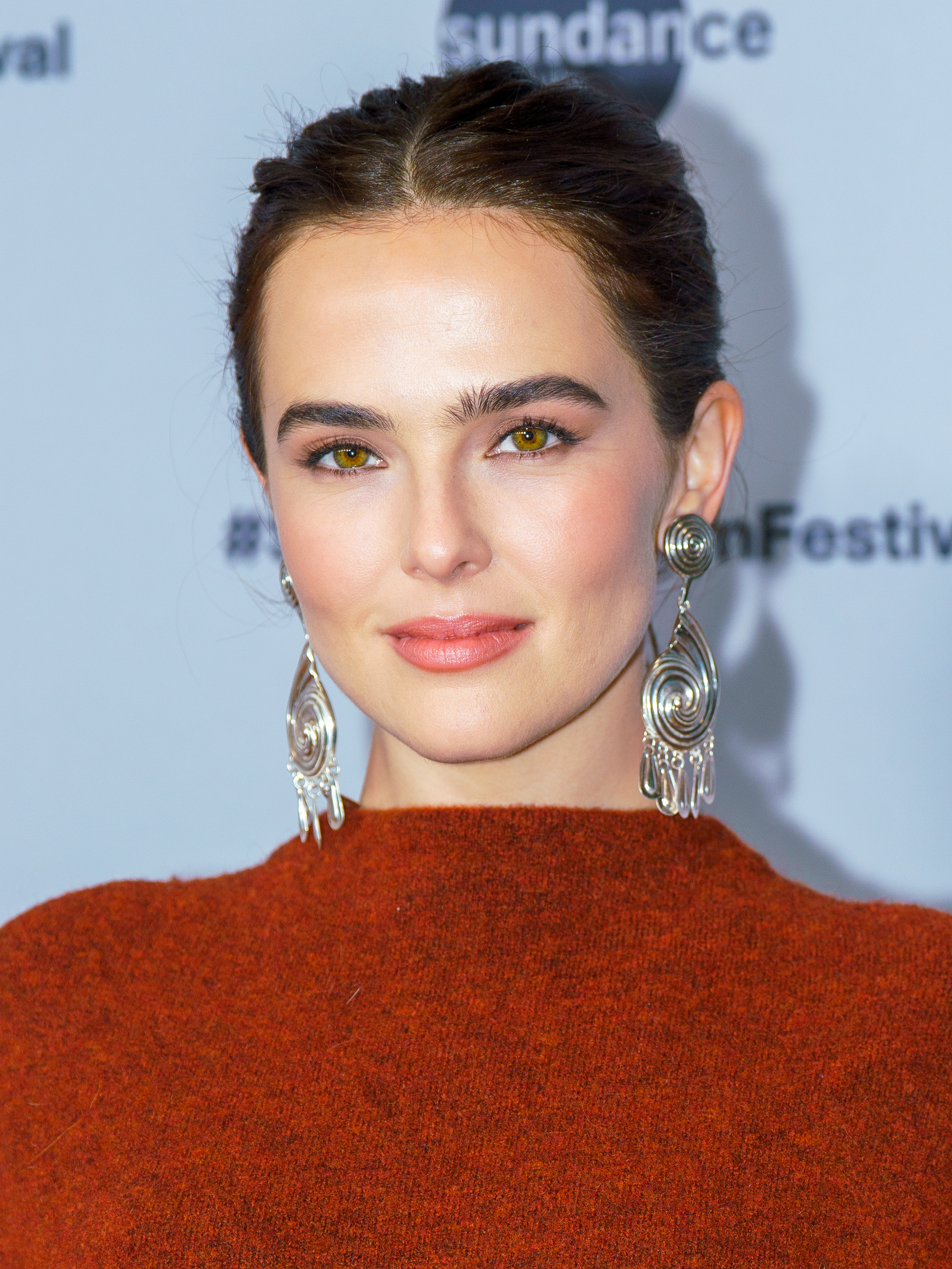
- Deutch in 2026
- Born: Zoey Francis Chaya Thompson Deutch; November 10, 1994 (age 32); Los Angeles, California, U.S.
- Occupations: Actress; producer
- Years active: 2009–present
- Partner(s): Jimmy Tatro (2021–present; engaged)
- Parents: Howard Deutch (father); Lea Thompson (mother)
- Relatives: Madelyn Deutch (sister); Robert Walden (grand-uncle)

Zoey Francis Chaya Thompson Deutch (/dɔɪtʃ/ DOYTCH; born November 10, 1994) is an American actress. The younger daughter of director Howard Deutch and actress-director Lea Thompson, Deutch made her acting debut in television during the early 2010s, with roles on Disney Channel's The Suite Life on Deck (2010–2011) and CW's Ringer (2011–2012).

Deutch has since expanded to film, with leading roles in the independent films Everybody Wants Some!! (2016), Before I Fall (2017), Flower (2017), Set It Up (2018), and Buffaloed (2019). Her first major box office success came with the comedy horror Zombieland: Double Tap (2019), after which she took on roles in the thrillers The Outfit (2022) and Juror No. 2 (2024). Deutch concurrently headlined the streaming projects The Politician (2019–2020), Not Okay, and Something from Tiffany's (both 2022), and made her Broadway debut in a revival of the Thornton Wilder play Our Town (2024). For her performance as Jean Seberg in Richard Linklater's biographical film Nouvelle Vague (2025), she was nominated for the Independent Spirit Award for Best Supporting Performance.

== Early life ==
Deutch was born on November 10, 1994, in Los Angeles, to actress Lea Thompson and director Howard Deutch. She has one sister, Madelyn Deutch, who is also an actress. Other close relatives of hers include her maternal grandmother, musician Barbara Barry Thompson, paternal grandfather, music executive Murray Deutch, and grand-uncle actor Robert Walden. Deutch's father, from New York, is of Jewish heritage, whereas her mother, from Minnesota, is of partial Irish ancestry. She attended Hebrew school at an early age, influenced in part by her mother's strong engagement with Jewish culture after marrying into the family. Deutch identifies as Jewish and had a bat mitzvah. Her surname is an Anglicized spelling variant of the word "Deutsch", which means "German" in German. Her ancestry is Russian, Polish, Irish, and Native American.

She started taking acting classes at the age of five. Deutch studied at Oakwood School, Los Angeles County High School for the Arts and at the Young Actors Space. She majored in theater at Los Angeles County High School for the Arts.

== Career ==
=== 2010–2013: Early work ===
Deutch began her career in 2010, at the age of 15, with a role on the Disney Channel original series The Suite Life on Deck as Maya, Zack Martin's love interest during the third season. From 2011 to 2012, she played recurring role of Juliet Martin in The CW thriller drama Ringer. She debuted on the big screen in Mayor Cupcake (2011) alongside her mother and sister. Deutch booked a small scene in The Amazing Spider-Man but director Marc Webb cut the scene, although it is included on the DVD.

Her big screen breakthrough came in the supporting role of Emily Asher, alongside Emma Thompson, Thomas Mann and Alden Ehrenreich in the 2013 fantasy-romance-drama Beautiful Creatures based on a well-known young adult novel of the same name written by authors Kami Garcia and Margaret Stohl and the first book in the Caster Chronicles series. Deutch also appeared on NCIS, Criminal Minds: Suspect Behavior, ABC Family's Switched at Birth and in Marc Cherry's television pilot Hallelujah.

=== 2014–2017: Breakthrough ===
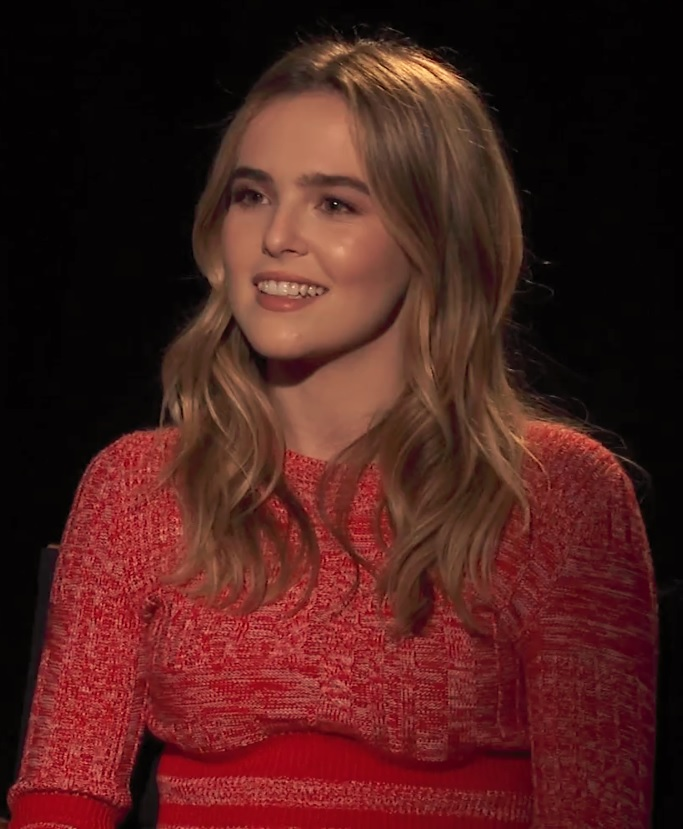
Deutch in June 2017

Deutch starred as Rosemarie Hathaway in Vampire Academy (2014), based on the first book of best-selling young adult six book series written by Richelle Mead. The film marked her first appearance as a lead. Jordan Hoffman of the New York Daily News termed her performance in the film as breakout lead performance. In January 2014, it was announced that she would star as lead opposite Tyson Ritter in Randall Miller's Midnight Rider, a biopic of Gregg Allman. Deutch then joined the teen coming-of-age comedy Good Kids, which was released on October 21, 2016, by Vertical Entertainment. She also landed the lead role in Julie Plec's and Sue Kramer's rom-com Cover Girl and starred in the official music video of the song "Opium" by The New Division with Avan Jogia.

In 2016, Deutch played Beverly in Richard Linklater's Everybody Wants Some!!, which premiered at SXSW Film Festival. Deutch was paired with freshman ballplayer Jake Bradford played by Blake Jenner. She starred alongside Robert De Niro and Zac Efron in Dirty Grandpa, as love interest to Efron's character and in Why Him? alongside James Franco, Bryan Cranston and Megan Mullally. She played a Stanford student, daughter to Cranston and Mullally's characters, who falls in love with a billionaire, Laird, played by Franco. Deutch's next role was in the crime drama Vincent-N-Roxxy, alongside Emory Cohen, Emile Hirsch and Zoë Kravitz which premiered at the 2016 Tribeca Film Festival. Deutch starred as Samantha "Sam" Kingston in Before I Fall, an adaptation of Lauren Oliver's best-selling young adult novel of the same name, also starring Jennifer Beals and Kian Lawley. Andrea Mandell of USA Today described Before I Fall as a milestone in Deutch's rising career. The scripts of Good Kids, Dirty Grandpa and Before I Fall were on the 2011 Black List. A second film featuring Deutch premiered at Sundance Film Festival in 2017, Danny Strong's Rebel in the Rye. The biopic of author J.D. Salinger saw Deutch as Oona O'Neill opposite Nicholas Hoult, Kevin Spacey, and Laura Dern.

Deutch starred in Flower directed by Max Winkler, with a script written by Alex McAulay. Flower was added to the 2012 Black List and premiered at the 2017 Tribeca Film Festival. Aubrey Page of Collider described her performance as an "electric lead performance" and David Ehrlich of IndieWire thought the film "confirms that Zoey Deutch is a genuine star in the making." Frank Scheck of The Hollywood Reporter concluded "Flower is redeemed only by Zoey Deutch's magnetic performance, which would be star-making if in the service of a better vehicle."

Deutch appeared in her mother Lea Thompson's directorial debut The Year Of Spectacular Men as Sabrina, with Avan Jogia, her sister Madelyn, Cameron Monaghan and Nicholas Braun. She also shares the production credit for the film. The film had its world premiere in June 2017 in Los Angeles Film Festival 2017 and was screened at various film festivals before theatrical release. Scott Menzel of We Live Entertainment described her role as Sabrina in this film as "without question her finest performance to date." Along with these, in the same year, was seen opposite Ed Sheeran in the official music video of his song "Perfect" from the album ÷. The video which was released on November 9, 2017, has garnered over 4 billion views and 22 million likes, as of August 2025. Also in 2017, she appeared in James Franco's The Disaster Artist, based on the book by Greg Sestero and Tom Bissell, which tells the behind-the-scenes story behind cult film The Room.

=== 2018–present: established actress ===
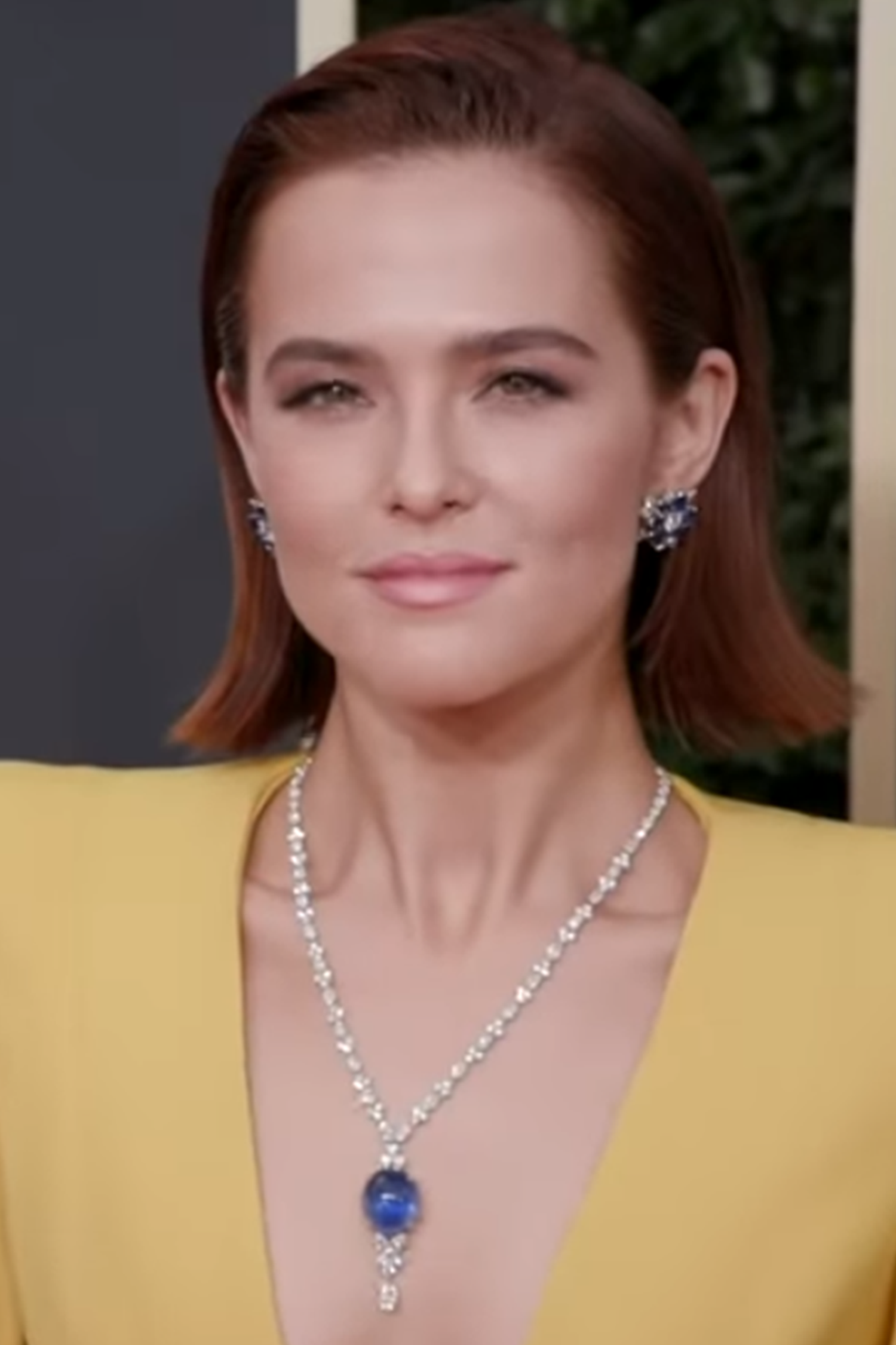
Zoey Deutch at Golden Globes 2020

Deutch starred opposite her Everybody Wants Some costar Glen Powell, in Netflix's 2018 romantic comedy Set It Up. The story follows two overworked assistants who try to get their horrible bosses out of their hair by setting them up together. She also landed a role in the drama-comedy The Professor alongside Johnny Depp. In May 2019, the makers of Set It Up announced that Deutch will be reuniting with Glen Powell for another rom-com tentatively titled Most Dangerous Game. In July 2018, it was announced that Deutch would be starring in Ryan Murphy's new web television comedy series on Netflix, The Politician alongside Ben Platt and Gwyneth Paltrow, which was released on Netflix on September 27, 2019.

In Tanya Wexler's crime comedy drama Buffaloed (2019), Deutch played the lead role of Peg Dahl, a con artist who, while on parole for her crimes and in a desperate attempt to escape her hometown of Buffalo, New York, becomes a debt collector. Co-produced by Deutch herself, and co-starring Judy Greer, Jermaine Fowler, Noah Reid and Jai Courtney, the film premiered at the Tribeca Film Festival to positive reviews from critics. Upon its limited theatrical release in February 2020, the film received further praise. In her review for The Los Angeles Times, Kimber Myers applauded Deutch's performance, saying she "immediately takes the audience hostage in the opening moments of Buffaloed [...] the actress owns this sharp comedy — and everyone watching — playing the type of character we still don’t see that often on screen." Sheila O'Malley of RogerEbert.com called the film, "a showcase for the mega-talented Deutch", saying Deutch "tosses herself into the role like a maniacal fidget-spinner, all flash and charm." Concluding her review of the film, O'Malley wrote, "Buffaloed is refreshing in how it challenges these norms, and in so doing, gives Deutch—who has already proven her comedic acting chops in Everybody Wants Some!!, Zombieland: Double Tap and the Netflix series The Politician—a chance to shine at the center of the narrative." TheWrap's Elizabeth Weitzman was more critical of the film, calling it "uneven", while The New York Times' Jeannette Catsoulis penned "Simultaneously rowdy and slick, Buffaloed is exuberantly paced and entirely dependent on Deutch’s moxie and pell-mell performance."

Deutch starred as Madison in Zombieland: Double Tap, which was released October 11, 2019. She received positive reviews for her performance, and was nominated at the 2020 Fangoria Chainsaw Awards for Best Supporting Actress. In 2020, Deutch starred in the Quibi television series adaptation Home Movie: The Princess Bride, to raise money for World Central Kitchen. In 2021, she appeared in the music video "Anyone", a song by Canadian singer Justin Bieber. She also joined Hound as the lead character "Callie" as well as producer. She voiced a role in an adult animated comedy series Fairfax which premiered on Amazon Prime Video in October 2021. Deutch starred in Graham Moore's directorial debut The Outfit (2022) alongside Mark Rylance and Dylan O'Brien which premiered at the 72nd Berlin International Film Festival. The same year she starred in Quinn Shephard's satire film Not Okay, which was released on Hulu. She starred and executive produced Something From Tiffany's, an Amazon Original film co-produced by Reese Witherspoon and Hello Sunshine, based on the Melissa Hill novel.

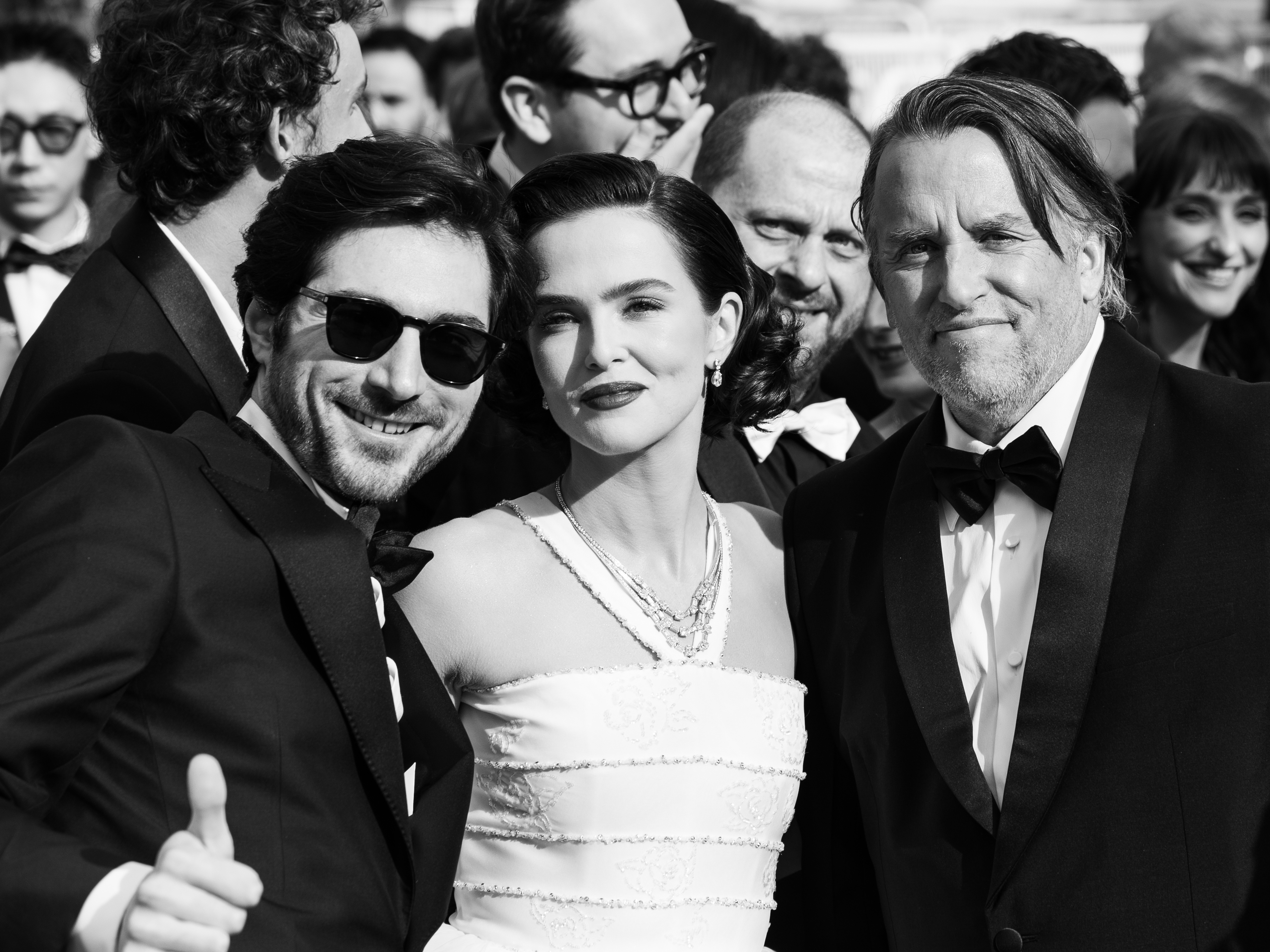
Deutch (center), with Guillaume Marbeck (L) and Richard Linklater (R) at the 2025 Cannes Film Festival for the premiere of Nouvelle Vague. Her performance has been praised by numerous critics.

In 2024, Deutch starred opposite Nicholas Hoult and Toni Collette in the drama thriller Juror #2, from director Clint Eastwood in his purported final effort as a filmmaker. The film received positive reviews from critics, as did her performance. From October 2024 to January 2025, she played Emily Webb, in a Broadway revival of the Thorton Wilder play Our Town at the Ethel Barrymore Theater. She acted alongside Jim Parsons and Katie Holmes in a production directed by Kenny Leon. Shania Russell of Entertainment Weekly wrote, "Deutch making her Broadway debut, is as instantly likable as ever. She balances easy charisma with distinct vulnerability". For the biographical film Nouvelle Vague, she reunited with director Richard Linklater portraying Jean Seberg during the period leading up to the latter's breakthrough role in the French New Wave film Breathless (1960). The film had its premiere at the 2025 Cannes Film Festival, where it was met with positive reviews from critics and audience alike. Critics describe her as being "well-cast" and "convincing" in the role. Pete Hammond of Deadline Hollywood described her as being "terrific", adding, "Deutch is especially impressive as Seberg. There wasn’t a moment I thought I was watching anyone else but Seberg." For the role, she earned a nomination for the Independent Spirit Award for Best Supporting Performance and several publications, including Variety, believed her worthy of a nomination for Best Supporting Actress at the 98th Academy Awards, though no nomination eventuated. Time included the performance in its selection of the best of 2025 in film. Deutch's third and final film of 2025 was the dystopian thriller film Anniversary, in which she starred opposite Diane Lane, Kyle Chandler, Madeline Brewer, Phoebe Dynevor, Mckenna Grace, Sky Yang, and Dylan O'Brien.

In 2026, Deutch starred alongside Michael Cassidy in Gail Daughtry and the Celebrity Sex Pass, a David Wain-directed comedy parodying Hollywood culture, with critics noting her energetic comedic performance as the emotional anchor of the film's absurdist tone. She also led the Netflix romantic comedy Voicemails for Isabelle, opposite Nick Robinson, where her performance was widely praised for its emotional depth and vulnerability, with reviewers highlighting how she balanced humor and grief in a role that became central to the film's major streaming success.

== Other work ==
Deutch along with Gugu Mbatha-Raw, Rodrigo Santoro and Vince Vaughn performed a live reading of selected scenes from five winning scripts of 2017 at the 2017 Academy Nicholl Fellowships in Screenwriting Awards Presentation & Live Read. She also joined as a presenter at 2018 Film Independent Spirit Awards. She again took the stage as a host for welcoming the co-founder of non-profit, non-governmental organization Vital Voices, Hillary Clinton at Global Leadership Awards 2018. She joined as one of the speakers in first ever "Embrace Ambition Summit" held at Lincoln Center in New York.

In 2018, Deutch was invited to join the Academy of Motion Picture Arts and Sciences (AMPAS) in the actors branch.

== Activism ==
Deutch supports Planned Parenthood and was part of its rally with pro-choice advocates and leaders celebrating the 45th anniversary of Roe v. Wade at Sacramento, California. She has performed for the benefit of Alzheimer's Association and "What a pair!" Org with her mother Lea Thompson and sister Madelyn Deutch. With her family, she has worked for more than a decade with Corazón de Vida, which supports orphanages in Baja California, Mexico. She participated in the 2017 Women's March, and returned in 2018. She is also a part of the Embrace Ambition campaign of the Tory Burch Foundation. She was one of the celebrity ambassadors for the seventh annual "Shop for Success" charity designer shopping event that supports the efforts of Dress For Success. She has also shown her support toward anti-sexual harassment movement Time's Up. She has been a part of several fundraising campaigns for charity and in support of various causes. Deutch said she felt "ashamed" of the U.S. government's handling of ICE and described its actions as "brutal," while wearing an "ICE Out" pin at the 2026 Sundance Film Festival and expressing solidarity with communities in Minnesota affected by recent incidents involving federal immigration enforcement, including the Killing of Renée Good.

=== Views on Israel ===
Deutch first visited Israel in 2013 as part of the "America's Voices in Israel" program, traveling with her parents, sister, and other actors. During the week-long trip, she visited Jerusalem, Masada, Yad Vashem, Tel Aviv, the Dead Sea, Golan Heights Winery in the Golan Heights, and southern Israel, including the Gaza border region. She described Israelis as people who "burn their candles and eat their candies," reflecting their appreciation for living in the moment. In June 2026, she faced online boycott calls over her Netflix romantic drama Voicemails for Isabelle after past Instagram posts resurfaced in which she expressed support for Israel during the Israeli–Palestinian conflict. The posts argued that Israel is not carrying out ethnic cleansing, described it as an ethnically diverse country, and rejected comparisons to apartheid-era South Africa. She also suggested that neighboring Arab countries share responsibility for the situation facing Palestinians and referenced the displacement of Jewish communities from Middle Eastern and North African countries after Israel's creation.

== In the media ==
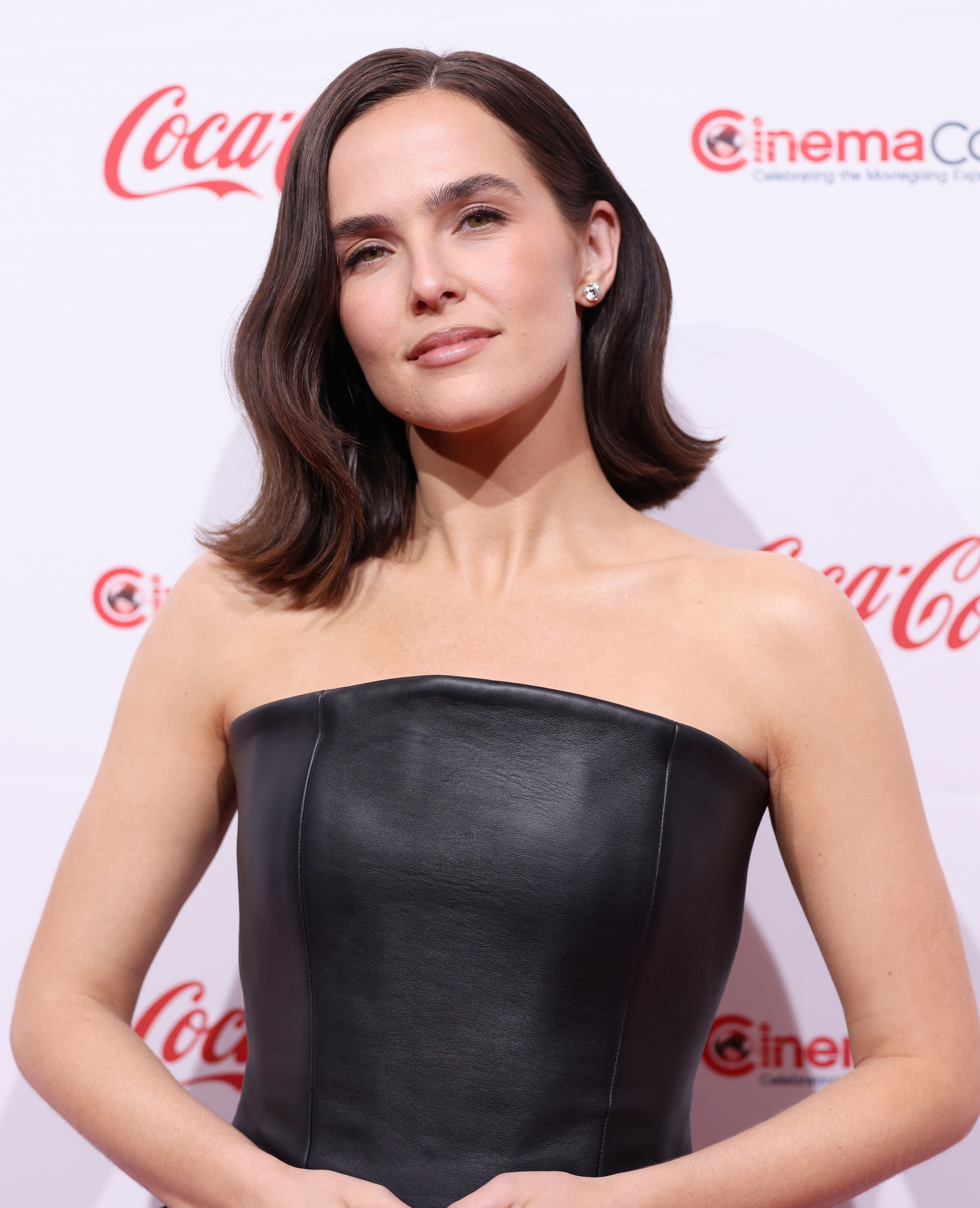
Deutch at the 2026 CinemaCon in Las Vegas.

Deutch has been on the cover of Justine magazine's February 2013 issue, Miabella magazine's April 2013 issue, Afterglow magazine's December 2013 issue, Bello magazine's March 2014 edition, Flaunt magazine's June 2015 issue, the February 2016 issue of Cosmopolitan U.S., spring 2016 edition of Rogue magazine. She appeared on the cover of September 2016 issue of Harper by Harper's Bazaar and performed as a guest editor.

She modeled for March 2013 issue of Interview, Allure's December 2016 issue and has done feature shoots for February 2014 issues of Seventeen and InStyle magazine, December 2015 issue of Nylon, January 2016 and April 2017 issues of W Magazine, March 2017 issue of Vanity Fair Italia, April 2017 issue of Vogue Russia and Vogue Turkey, May 2017 issue of Vanity Fair Spain, July 2017 issue of Marie Claire Indonesia, summer 2017 issue of Wonderland magazine and summer campaign shoot for Tory Burch LLC.

She was on the cover of the April 2017 issue of C California Style Magazine and also among Marie Claire's Fresh Faces 2017 and one of the cover stars of its May 2017 edition. She was on the cover of annual Women Of Hollywood portfolio of The Edit magazine in May 2017, Spring/Summer 2017 issue 07 of Tidal Magazine, and on the February 2018 edition of New York Post Alexa. She was the May 2018 cover star of Ocean Drive magazine, Capitol File Magazine, and Los Angeles Confidential magazine. In 2020, she featured in first ever worldwide video and image campaign, #MeAndMyPeekaboo by Italian luxury fashion house Fendi.

She is frequently included in best dressed lists for her various appearances and also seen in front rows of Milan Fashion Week, Paris Fashion Week, Diane von Furstenberg, Cushnie et Ochs, DKNY, New York Fashion Week, Fendi's Haute couture show. In 2013, Glamour included her among their list of "Hollywood's Next Big Things". Deutch was among the Yahoo! Breakout Stars for the year 2014. In 2014, Vanity Fair listed her among their "Hollywood's Next Wave Lineup". In the same year, Variety also included her in their list of "'It' Girls (And Boys): Young Hollywood's Rising Stars". The Hollywood Reporter listed her among their "Next Gen Talent 2016: Hollywood's Rising Stars 35 and Under" list.

Harper's Bazaar described her as "quickly becoming Young Hollywood's most valuable player". In 2017, British GQ described her as "Hollywood's hottest newcomer" and Grazia Italy described her as the symbol of the "new generation of actresses-activists". In a 2018 Indie Wire critics survey, she was listed among "The Best American Actors Under 30". She was included in 'Forbes 30 under 30' class of 2020 in the field of Hollywood and entertainment.

== Personal life ==
Deutch has struggled with anxiety since childhood. She experienced bullying during her middle school years, saying they were "horrible," but that it taught her compassion. She also described her relationship with social media as "complicated," admitting addiction to it.

In 2012, Deutch began dating Canadian actor Avan Jogia. In September 2016, they ended their relationship. Since 2021, Deutch has been in a relationship with actor and comedian Jimmy Tatro. They announced their engagement in September 2025.

== Filmography ==
=== Film ===
Year	Title	Role	Notes
2011	Mayor Cupcake	Lana Maroni	
2012	The Amazing Spider-Man	Gossip Girl	Deleted scene
2013	Beautiful Creatures	Emily Asher	
2014	Vampire Academy	Rosemarie "Rose" Hathaway	
2016	Of Dogs and Men	Lily	Short film
2016	Dirty Grandpa	Shadia	
2016	Everybody Wants Some!!	Beverly	
2016	Vincent N Roxxy	Kate	
2016	Good Kids	Nora Sullivan	
2016	Why Him?	Stephanie Fleming	
2017	Before I Fall	Samantha Kingston	
2017	Rebel in the Rye	Oona O'Neill	
2017	The Disaster Artist	Bobbi	
2017	Flower	Erica Vandross	
2017	The Year of Spectacular Men	Sabrina Klein	Also producer
2018	Set It Up	Harper Moore	
2018	The Professor	Claire	
2019	Buffaloed	Peg Dahl	Also producer
2019	Zombieland: Double Tap	Madison	
2020	Ben Platt Live from Radio City Music Hall	Herself	
2022	The Outfit	Mable Shaun	
2022	Not Okay	Danni Sanders	Also executive producer
2022	Something from Tiffany's	Rachel Meyer	Also executive producer
2024	Juror #2	Allison "Ally" Crewson	
2025	The Threesome	Olivia	Also executive producer
2025	Nouvelle Vague	Jean Seberg	
2025	Anniversary	Cynthia	
2026	Gail Daughtry and the Celebrity Sex Pass	Gail Daughtry	also executive producer
2026	Voicemails for Isabelle	Jill Shaw	
2026	Minions & Monsters	Debbie (voice)	
2027	The 99'ers	Marla Messing	Post-production

=== Television ===
Year	Title	Role	Notes
2010–2011	The Suite Life on Deck	Maya Bennett	Recurring role; 7 episodes
2011	NCIS	Lauren	Episode: "One Last Score"
2011	Criminal Minds: Suspect Behavior	Blue Mask Girl / Kristi Anna	Episode: "The Girl in the Blue Mask"
2011	Hallelujah	Willow Turner	Unaired ABC pilot
2011–2012	Ringer	Juliet Martin	Recurring role; 18 episodes
2013	Switched at Birth	Elisa Sawyer	2 episodes
2014	Under the Gunn	Herself / Guest Judge	Episode: "Unconventional Vampire"
2019–2020	The Politician	Infinity Jackson	Main role
2020	Home Movie: The Princess Bride	Princess Buttercup / Fezzik	Episode: "Chapter Ten: To the Pain!"
2021	Fairfax	Lily (voice)	Guest role
2026	Invincible	Zoe Thompson / Tech Jacket (voice)	Recurring role

=== Theatre ===
Year	Title	Role	Venue	Ref.
2024–2025	Our Town	Emily Webb	Ethel Barrymore Theatre, Broadway	

=== Music videos ===
Year	Title	Artist	Role	Ref.
2014	"Opium"	The New Division	—N/a	—N/a
2017	"Perfect"	Ed Sheeran	—N/a	—N/a
2021	"Anyone"	Justin Bieber	—N/a	—N/a
2026	"Do Me Right"	Mr. Fantasy	Herself	
2026	"The Time of My Life"	Middle Aged Dad Jam Band	Herself	

== Awards and nominations ==
Award	Year	Category	Nominated work	Result	Ref.
Astra Film Awards	2026	Virtuoso Award	—	Honored	
British Independent Film Awards	2022	Best Supporting Performance	The Outfit	Nominated	
Broadway.com Audience Choice Awards	2025	Favorite Featured Actress in a Play	Our Town	Won	
Dallas International Film Festival	2017	Diff Shining Star Award	—	Won	
Fangoria Chainsaw Awards	2020	Best Supporting Actress	Zombieland: Double Tap	Nominated	
Hollywood Critics Association	2020	Next Generation of Hollywood	—	Won	
Independent Spirit Awards	2026	Best Supporting Performance	Nouvelle Vague	Nominated	
Ischia Global Film and Music Festival	2019	Ischia Actress of the Year	—	Won	
Mill Valley Film Festival	2025	Acting	Nouvelle Vague	Won	
Napa Valley Film Festival	2016	Chandon Rising Star	—	Won	
SCAD Savannah Film Festival	2017	Rising Star Award	—	Won	
Teen Choice Awards	2014	Choice Movie Actress: Comedy	Vampire Academy	Nominated	
Teen Choice Awards	2017	Choice Movie Actress: Drama	Before I Fall	Nominated	
Women in Film Crystal + Lucy Awards	2017	MAXMARA Face of the Future	—	Won	
