= Plastic Fantastic (album) =

Studio album by Flesh for Lulu
- Released: 1989
- Genre: Rock
- Label: Capitol
- Producer: Mark Opitz, Zeus B. Held

Flesh for Lulu chronology
Long Live the New Flesh (1987)	Plastic Fantastic (1989)	Gigantic (2007)

Plastic Fantastic is an album by the English band Flesh for Lulu, released in 1989. The band, with a different rhythm section, supported it by opening for Public Image Limited on a North American tour. "Decline and Fall" and "Time and Space" peaked at Nos. 15 and 9, respectively, on Billboard's Modern Rock Tracks chart.

== Production ==
The album was produced primarily by Mark Opitz. Flesh for Lulu decided in part to record at INXS' studio in Sydney, Australia, to get away from the English music scene. "Slide", which was originally written for the soundtrack to Uncle Buck, was produced by Zeus B. Held. The title track was inspired by the band's time in Hollywood; "Decline and Fall" also criticizes American culture and lifestyles.

== Critical reception ==
Professional ratings
Review scores
Source	Rating
AllMusic	2/5 stars
Alternative Rock	7/10
Chicago Tribune	2.5/4 stars
The Encyclopedia of Popular Music	3/5 stars
The Great Indie Discography	5/10
The Ottawa Citizen	2/5 stars
St. Petersburg Times	3/5 stars

Spin described the album as "a serious bash complete with nonstop rockers, funky beats, sentimental love songs and frenzied guitars." The St. Petersburg Times called Rocco Barker's guitar playing "concise and literate, if not terribly dexterous." The Washington Post opined that Plastic Fantastic "has the pleasant but vague sound of much Oz rock." The Ottawa Citizen said that it "is the band's attempt the crossover from the London Batcave underground to mainstream rock... The edges are muted here with acoustic guitar and a dampened spirit."

The Chicago Tribune noted that despite some serious lyrical topics, the music moves "at top-40 speed throughout." The Kansas City Star concluded that the album "should cement Flesh for Lulu's place among the better bands to emerge in the '80s." The Tampa Tribune said that the "former gloom rockers ... have graduated to greater pop accessibility". The Evening Herald panned the "big bland sound".

The Trouser Press Record Guide stated that, "beyond its lack of sales, there's little to distinguish this effort from a Billy Idol album."

== Track listing ==
No.	Title	Length
1.	"Decline and Fall"
2.	"House of Cards"
3.	"Time and Space"
4.	"Every Little Word"
5.	"Slowdown"
6.	"Highwire"
7.	"Slide"
8.	"Day One"
9.	"Choosing You"
10.	"Stupid on the Street"
11.	"Avenue"
12.	"Plastic Fantastic"
