= Wolkwitz =

German surname

Wolkwitz is a family name, or surname, of German/Yiddish/Western-Slavic origins.

== Meaning ==
Wolkwitz is a surname of German/Western-Slavic origin. "-witz" in this case is not the German word for wit/joke, but is a German variation on a Slavic suffix "-vich," "-vic," "-wits," "-witz," or "-wicz" (-wicz being a Polish variation) meaning "son of," "child of," "family of," "clan of," etc. Having the suffix "-witz" at the end of a surname usually signifies heritage from the Western-Slavic peoples of Pomerania, or elsewhere in Eastern Germany.

People with "-witz" surnames would be more likely to have ancestry from parts of East Germany. Although original bearers of a surname with such a suffix would have been predominantly Christian, many Jewish families with German ancestry also carry a "-witz" suffix, likely from being forced to take a more "German-sounding" name by the authorities back then. In the 20th century some members of the Volkovitz family living in New York changed their last name to Walker to avoid being treated poorly by those who held anti-Semitic beliefs, although most people with such prefixes in their names might not be Jewish at all.

"Wolk," in this case, could be a misspelling of the German word Volk, meaning "people" or "nation." Much more likely, however, is that "Wolk" is derived from a Polabian Slavic word for "Wolf." This is more likely because a Slavic word (Wolk = Wolf) would be paired with a Slavic suffix (-witz = family of -), instead of the odd pairing of a misspelled German word (Wolk = Volk = People) with the Slavic suffix.

The surname could be related to, or a branch of the surnames Wolkowitz, Volkwitz, and Volkowitz (likely a result of poor documentation over time or variation in spelling in differing regions of Germany).

The most accurate translation of the meaning of Wolkwitz would be "Family of the Wolf", or "Son of the Wolf".

== History and original distribution ==
The origin of the Wolkwitz family/surname comes from the area of Pomerania and is tied to the history of the Pomeranian tribes known as the Veleti. Pomerania is a region located on the Baltic Sea straddling the border between the modern states of Germany and Poland. The modern German Land of Mecklenburg-Vorpommern in English would be called 'Mecklenburg-Western Pomerania'. The area of Western Pomerania became inhabited by Western-Slavic peoples known as the Veleti (also known as the Wiltzes and later Liutizians) after Germanic tribes moved south in the 6th and 7th centuries. The Veleti separated into a number of tribes after their central rulers were defeated by Charlemagne in 798. The four most important Veleti tribes were the Kessini, the Zirzipani, the Tollenser, and the Redarier (The Wolkwitz family probably originated with the Zirzipani, but may have had Tollenser ties).

The tribes were involved in trade with Scandinavians and other Baltic peoples, as well as conflict with the Saxons and Obotrites (another Western-Slavic people). In 936 the Holy Roman Empire divided Veletian lands into two frontier regions and placed Saxon nobles in charge. This led to the formation of the Liutizian alliance between the tribes, which met in the fortified temple-city of Rethra (modern-day Neubrandenburg). The Liutizian alliance lead a successful uprising against Saxon rule and regained independence for the Veletian tribes in 983, under the name of the Liutizian Federation. The Liutizian Federation briefly aligned with the Holy Roman Empire to defeat the Polish Piast Diocese of Kolberg in Eastern Pomerania in 1005. The Liutizian Federation fell apart in a civil war in 1057. Rethra, the former Liutizian capital, was then raided and destroyed by Saxons in 1069. After a few decades of raids by Danes and Saxons, the Liutizian tribes were essentially incorporated into the Obotrite Confederacy by 1093 and paid tribute to the Christian Obotrite Prince Henry.

Following Prince Henry's death in 1127, the Duke of Saxony (and later Holy Roman Emperor), Lothar III, granted the Obotrite realm to his vassal, Canute Lavard of the Danes. Two Obotrite leaders emerged; Pribislav and Niklot, who renounced Christianity in favor of West-Slavic traditional religious beliefs, which were based on Slavic mythology. Niklot began open resistance to the Danes and Saxons. In 1131, he became Chief of the Obotrite Confederacy, the Kissini and the Zirzipani tribes (thus becoming the Wolkwitz family's chief), following the coincidental murder of Canute Lavard. In 1147, Christian Saxons and Danes formed a crusade against Niklot's Obotrite Confederacy and other Pagan Western-Slavs in the area (such as the Tollenser, the Redarier and the Pomeranians) known as the Wendish Crusade. This provoked Niklot to preemptively invade Saxon-held Wagria. Crusaders pushed Niklot out of Wagria and succeeded in a mass baptism of Western-Slavs at Dobin and destroying the Pagan temple-city of Malchow. The crusaders were then repulsed by Niklot at the old Liutizian stronghold of Demmin and dispersed after reaching already-Christian Stettin, in Central-Pomerania. The crusade led to the gradual conversion of Western-Slavs to Christianity and, in 1155, the beginning of the partitioning of Obotrite lands. In 1158, Saxons and Danes realigned and attacked the Obotrite Confederacy in a virtual second crusade. They finally killed Chief Niklot in 1160 and divided the remaining Obotrite lands into the Duchies of Mecklenburg and Pomerania. It would have been at this time that the Wolkwitz family converted to Christianity, if not during the original Wendish crusade.

From 1160 to 1185 the Danes and the Holy Roman Empire competed for control of Pomerania along with the weaken local Slavic leaders, all the while converting more to Christianity. The Danes achieved supremacy in Pomerania until 1227. The 13th through the 15th centuries would see Pomeranian towns like Demmin join the Hanseatic League. Many more Germans then came to settle Pomerania during the "Ostsiedlung," or "settlement of the East." This led to the assimilation of Western-Slavs into Germanic culture. This is the period of time when the Wolkwitz family would adopt the German language, customs and become more properly "Germanized."

The Slavic Polabian language (The language that "Wolkwitz" is derived from) survived in some part until the 18th century but is now extinct with little remnants other than a few words, place, and surnames like Wolkwitz. Wolk was the Polabian word for wolf and -witz was used to denote "son of/ family of" in this language. The best probable explanation for the origin of the Wolkwitz surname is that a group within one of the Veleti tribes hunted wolves and became known as the "family of the wolf": Wolkwitz (or Wolkowitz). The village of Wolkwitz, which was founded circa 1600, is located South of the Peene River near the Kummerower Lake, in between the Liutizian fortress/trade-cities of Demmin and Malchin. This is the border of Zirzipani and Tollenser territory, but because more Zirzipanians would have lived in Demmin and Malchin before moving East, and it is likely that the Wolkwitz family lived in or near Demmin or Malchin, the Wolkwitz family probably originates with the Zirzipani tribe. The Wolkwitz family probably lived in or near Demmin or Malchin, if not further West in Teterow, from about 900-1600 before founding the small farming village of Wolkwitz around 1600.

After being assimilated into what is now Germany, many Pomeranian peoples moved throughout parts of Northern and Eastern Germany. Most notably, some of the people with a Wolkwitz surname eventually migrated to the areas around Leipzig from their original location in the modern district of Demmin and in Wolkwitz village, though it is unknown exactly when this occurred. This is reinforced by the name of the town of Liebertwolkwitz, a suburb of Leipzig in Saxony. Many Wolkwitz family members stayed in the Leipzig area until they migrated again to the United States of America in the late 19th century.

== Current distribution ==
Immigrants bearing the surname Wolkwitz and/or Wolkowitz came to the United States in the late 19th century. Most probably came from Liebertwolkwitz and Leipzig. Although they probably came together, the bearers of the surname dispersed throughout America. Today, people with Wolkwitz, Wolkowitz, Volkwitz, and Volkowitz surnames can be found living in parts of Connecticut, Illinois, Indiana, Michigan, Minnesota, Missouri, New Jersey, New York, Pennsylvania, and Washington, DC with the largest concentration living within the New York City metropolitan area.

Additionally there are 23 households with a Wolkwitz surname listed in telephone books living in modern Germany. Wolkwitz members live in the Bundesländer of Mecklenburg-Vorpommern, Niedersachsen, Sachsen, Nordrhein-Westfalen, Hamburg, and Berlin, with the largest concentrations living in Sachsen and Berlin.

== Wolkwitz Village and Liebertwolkwitz Town ==
Wolkwitz is a village in the District of Demmin, Mecklenburg-Vorpommern, Germany. It was founded around 1600 and features a small Protestant church built of fieldstone which houses some historic Renaissance art. The abandoned and bricked-up Wolkwitz Manor house is denoted as a German historical building but has an uncertain future. Wolkwitz can be found online at .

Liebertwolkwitz is a town near Leipzig, Sachsen, Germany. It was the site of a large battle in the Napoleonic Wars and is a center for traditional German cultural activities. Liebertwolkwitz can be found online at .
