= Lea Thompson =

American actress and director (born 1961)

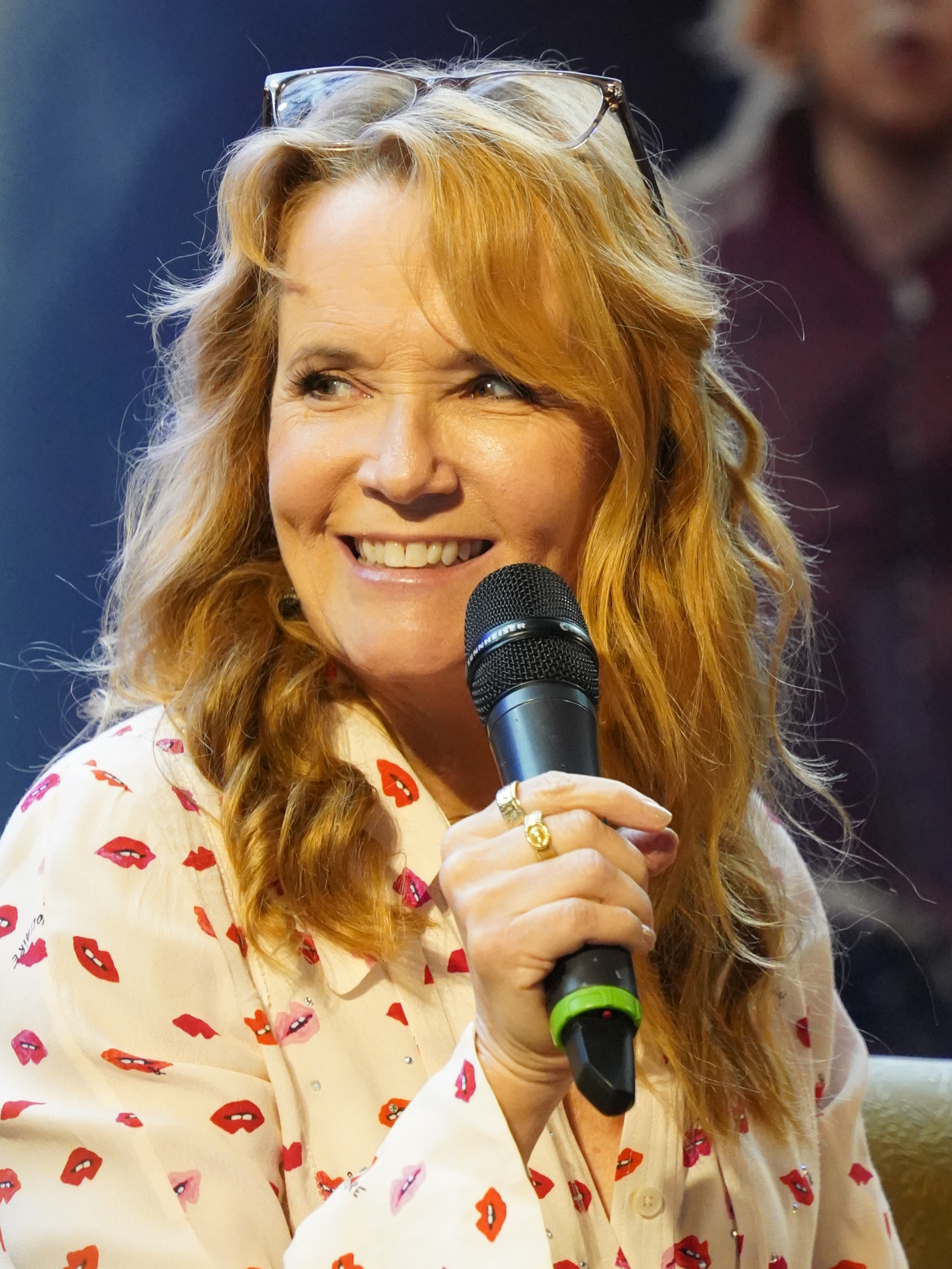
- Thompson in 2023
- Born: Lea Katherine Thompson; May 31, 1961 (age 65); Rochester, Minnesota, U.S.
- Other name: Lea Deutch
- Education: American Ballet Theatre
- Occupations: Actress; director; singer; dancer
- Years active: 1982–present
- Spouse: Howard Deutch (m. 1989)
- Children: Madelyn Deutch; Zoey Deutch

Lea Katherine Thompson (born May 31, 1961) is an American actress, singer, dancer and director.

Thompson is best known for her roles as Lorraine Baines-McFly in the Back to the Future film trilogy (1985–1990), Beverly Switzler in Howard the Duck (1986), and Amanda Jones in Some Kind of Wonderful (1987). Other films for which she is known include All the Right Moves (1983), Red Dawn (1984), Dennis the Menace (1993), and The Beverly Hillbillies (1993). In the 1990s, Thompson played the title character Caroline Duffy in the sitcom Caroline in the City. From 2011 to 2017, she co-starred as Kathryn Kennish in the ABC Family-turned-Freeform series Switched at Birth.

== Early life ==
Lea Thompson was born on May 31, 1961, in Rochester, Minnesota, one of five children of Clifford and Barbara Barry Thompson, a musician. She has two sisters, Coleen Goodrich and Shannon Katona, and two brothers, Andrew and Barry. Thompson is of Irish, English, Scots-Irish, German, and distant Dutch ancestry.

Mikhail Baryshnikov, who was the artistic director at the time, told Thompson, "You're a lovely dancer, but you're too stocky." She said it was "my epiphany when I decided to stop dancing and not be a ballet dancer. It was a wonderful moment because I could've been banging my head against the wall for another 10 years."

Thompson appeared in a number of Burger King advertisements in the 1980s with Sarah Michelle Gellar and Elisabeth Shue, her later co-star in Back to the Future Part II and Back to the Future Part III.

== Career ==
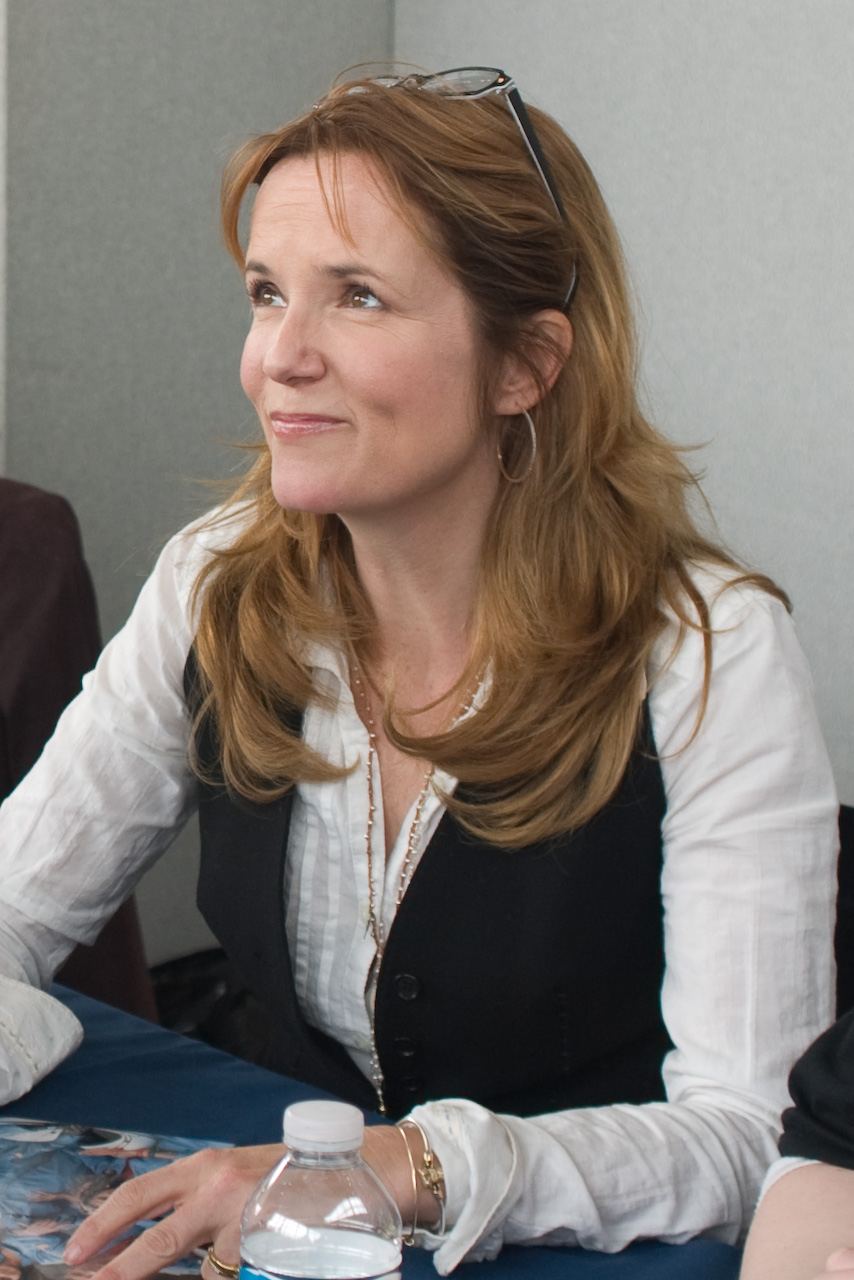
Thompson at the 2008 Collectormania 13 Convention in Milton Keynes, United Kingdom

In 1982, Thompson played Cecily "Sissy" Loper in the interactive live-action video game MysteryDisc: Murder, Anyone?. She made her movie debut in 1983 with Jaws 3-D. Thompson recalled the film as "the very first movie I ever got, but I lied and said I had done a couple of other movies, so when I showed up, I really knew absolutely nothing. Also, I had said that I knew how to water ski. And I did not. So I had, like, five days to learn really, really complicated water-skiing things, because I had to fit into the Sea World water-skiing show. I don't even know how to swim!" Thompson followed this with All the Right Moves (1983), Red Dawn (1984), and The Wild Life (1984).

Thompson's most famous role is that of Lorraine Baines McFly in the Back to the Future trilogy, with the first film released in 1985. Her character is the mother of Marty McFly (Michael J. Fox), whom Marty meets when she is a 1950s teenager after he travels back in time. Marty has to avoid letting Lorraine fall in love with him instead of with his future father, George McFly (Crispin Glover), leading to awkward scenes in which Lorraine is attracted to Marty.

In 1986, Thompson starred in SpaceCamp and Howard the Duck. For the latter film, she sang several songs on the soundtrack in character, as musician Beverly Switzler, who was the lead vocalist for a band called Cherry Bomb. The recordings appeared on the soundtrack album and on singles. Rounding out film appearances in the late 1980s, Thompson starred in Some Kind of Wonderful, Casual Sex?, and The Wizard of Loneliness. She also had a prominent role in the 1989 TV film Nightbreaker, for which she was nominated for a CableACE Award. In the early 1990s, Thompson starred as Alice Mitchell, the mother of the eponymous character Dennis Mitchell (Mason Gamble) in Dennis the Menace (1993), the villainess Laura Jackson in The Beverly Hillbillies (1993), and Ms. Roberts, a snooty ballet instructor in The Little Rascals (1994). She also appeared in several TV films throughout the 1990s, including The Substitute Wife (1994) and The Right to Remain Silent (1996).

Thompson found moderate critical and popular success as the star of the NBC sitcom Caroline in the City from 1995 to 1999. In 1996, she received a People's Choice Award for Favorite Female Performer in a New TV Series, while her show won for Favorite New TV Comedy Series at the 22nd People's Choice Awards. Thompson also starred in A Will of Their Own, a 1998 American television mini-series directed by Karen Arthur. The film follows six generations of females within one family, and their struggle for power and independence in America. The film debuted on October 18, 1998, on NBC to strong critical reviews.

After a break from acting, Thompson went on to star in several Broadway plays. She later appeared in a TV series called For the People, which only lasted one season. Thompson then starred in a TV film, Stealing Christmas (2003), starring Tony Danza and Betty White. She also appeared in several episodes of the dramedy series Ed and in a guest role for one episode in 2004 on NBC's Law & Order: Special Victims Unit; she played Michelle Osborne, a woman whose embryos were stolen.

In 2005, Thompson began a series of made-for-TV films for the Hallmark Channel, Jane Doe, where she played Cathy Davis, an ex-secret agent turned housewife, who helps the government solve mysteries. Thompson directed two films from the Jane Doe series – Jane Doe: The Harder They Fall and Jane Doe: Eye of the Beholder.

Thompson was a featured singer on Celebrity Duets and the second contestant eliminated in 2006. In April 2007, she starred in another television film, A Life Interrupted, which premiered on Lifetime.

Thompson guest-starred on the show Head Case in January 2008. She appeared in the TV film Final Approach, which debuted in the U.S. on May 24, 2008. Thompson's film credits include Exit Speed, Spy School, Splinterheads, and Adventures of a Teenage Dragon Slayer. She starred in the television movie The Christmas Clause, which received good reviews and ratings.

Thompson starred in Mystery Case Files: Shadow Lake, an adventure game released in November 2012 by Big Fish Games. In the game, Thompson's daughter Madelyn Deutch played Kelli, a paranormal television-series host.

From 2011 to 2017, Thompson starred in the ABC Family series Switched at Birth, about a family realizing their 16-year-old daughter Bay Kennish (Vanessa Marano) is not biologically theirs and was switched with another baby Daphne Vasquez (Katie Leclerc) at the hospital.

In 2014, Thompson was a competitor on the 19th season of Dancing with the Stars. She was paired with professional dancer Artem Chigvintsev. The Thompson/Chigvintsev team was eliminated in the quarterfinals, finishing sixth place. Thompson also played Irene Steele in the film Left Behind.

On April 27, 2017, Thompson was cast in the film Little Women, the seventh adaptation of Louisa May Alcott's novel of the same title, written and directed by first-time director Clare Niederpruem. Thompson portrayed Margaret "Marmee" March, the mother who helps her daughters navigate the struggles and heartbreaks of adolescence and adulthood. The film was released on September 28, 2018, to coincide with the book's 150th-anniversary publishing date.

Thompson directed "Assimilation" and "Watcher" episodes 3 and 4 and appeared as Dr. Diane Werner in "Fly Me to the Moon", episode 5 of season 2 of the Paramount+ series Star Trek: Picard, which aired in March 2022.

Thompson starred with Stacey Farber in the CTV Television Network Canadian police procedural, comedy, and drama series The Spencer Sisters. The series began in February 2023 and was canceled in 2024.

Thompson directed three episodes of the Syfy series Resident Alien in 2022 and 2024.

Thompson is the director of the 2026 USA Network drama series Anna Pigeon based on the novel series by Nevada Barr.

== Personal life ==
Thompson was engaged to Dennis Quaid from 1984 to 1987. She met film director Howard Deutch on the set of Some Kind of Wonderful in 1987, and they were married in 1989.

Thompson and Deutch have two daughters, both actresses: Madelyn Deutch (b. 1991) and Zoey Deutch (b. 1994), with whom she sang on stage in the Bye Bye Birdie production for the 16th annual Alzheimer's Association "A Night at Sardi's" in March 2008.

== Awards and nominations ==
Year	Association	Category	Nominated work	Result
1985	Saturn Awards	Best Supporting Actress	Back to the Future	Nominated
1987	Young Artist Award	Best Young Actress in a Motion Picture – Drama	Some Kind of Wonderful	Won
1990	Kids' Choice Awards	Favorite Movie Actress	Back to the Future Part II	Won
1995	People's Choice Awards	Favorite Female Performer in a New TV Series	Caroline in the City	Won
1996	Satellite Award	Best Actress in a TV Series – Musical or Comedy	Caroline in the City	Nominated
2014	American Movie Awards	Best Actress	The Trouble with the Truth	Won
