= I Go Crazy (Flesh for Lulu song) =

Single by Flesh for Lulu

from the album Long Live the New Flesh
- Released: 1987
- Genre: Alternative rock, new wave
- Length: 3:54
- Label: Beggars Banquet
- Songwriters: Nick Marsh, Kevin Mills, James Mitchell, Rocco Barker
- Producer: Flesh for Lulu

Flesh for Lulu singles chronology
"Postcards from Paradise" (1987)	"I Go Crazy" (1987)	"Time and Space" (1990)

"I Go Crazy" is a song by British alternative rock band Flesh for Lulu from their third studio album Long Live the New Flesh (1987). An American college rock radio hit, the song gained prominence through its inclusion on the soundtrack to the 1987 film Some Kind of Wonderful.

== Music video ==
Two music videos were made the song. One for the movie "Some Kind of Wonderful" with clips from the movie itself and the promotional video for the single itself. Directed by Andy Morahan for the movie and Nick Egan for the promotional video, coinciding with the song to support promotional videos for the release as a single.
