= Switched at Birth season 2 =

Switched at Birth
- Season 2
- Starring: Sean Berdy; Lucas Grabeel; Katie Leclerc; Vanessa Marano; Constance Marie; Gilles Marini; D. W. Moffett; Lea Thompson
- No. of episodes: 21

Release
- Original network: ABC Family
- Original release: January 7 – August 19, 2013

Season chronology
- ← Previous; Season 1 Next → Season 3

The second season of ABC Family drama television series Switched at Birth was commissioned on August 17, 2012. It premiered on January 7, 2013, in the United States and consisted of 21 episodes. The season is produced by ABC Family, Pirates' Cove Entertainment and Suzy B Productions, with Paul Stupin, Becky Hartman Edwards, John Ziffren, and series creator Lizzy Weiss serving as executive producers.

The one-hour scripted drama revolves around two teenagers who discover they were switched at birth and grew up in very different environments. While balancing school, jobs, and their unconventional family, the girls, along with their friends and family, experience deaf culture, relationships, classism, racism, audism, and other social issues.

The ninth episode of the season, entitled "Uprising", made television history by becoming the first episode of a national mainstream television series to be told almost entirely in American Sign Language.

== Cast ==
=== Main ===
- Sean Berdy as Emmett Bledsoe
- Lucas Grabeel as Toby Kennish
- Katie Leclerc as Daphne Paloma Vasquez
- Vanessa Marano as Bay Madeleine Kennish
- Constance Marie as Regina Vasquez
- Gilles Marini as Angelo Sorrento
- D. W. Moffett as John Kennish
- Lea Thompson as Kathryn Kennish

=== Recurring ===
- Ryan Lane as Travis Barnes
- Cassi Thomson as Nikki Papagus
- Marlee Matlin as Melody Bledsoe
- Blair Redford as Tyler "Ty" Mendoza
- Stephanie Nogueras as Natalie Pierce
- Matt Kane as Jace
- Max Lloyd-Jones as Noah
- Matthew Risch as Chip Coto
- Ivonne Coll as Adrianna Vasquez
- Daniel Durant as Matthew
- B.K. Cannon as Mary Beth Tucker
- Annie Ilonzeh as Lana
- Morgan Krantz as Mac
- Brandon J. Sornberger as Mark
- Kari Coleman as Whitney
- Todd Williams as Zane
- Robert Curtis Brown as Ivan Ronan
- Brian Gutierrez as Cody
- Danielle Rayne as Patricia Sawyer
- Jerry Ferris as Coach Lubin
- Anthony Natale as Cameron Bledsoe
- Joey Lauren Adams as Jennice Papagus
- Laura Spencer as Parker Robinsan
- Carlease Burke as Ms. Rose
- Maiara Walsh as Simone Sinclair
- Justin Bruening as Jeff Reycraft
- Allison Scagliotti as Aida Adams
- Stephen Lunsford as Teo Hanahan
- Zoey Deutch as Elisa Sawyer
- Charlene Amoia as Diana Coto
- William Lucking as Bill Kennish
- Kim Rhodes as Tria
- Meeghan Holaway as Amanda Burke
- Karla Gutierrez as Amy
- Suanne Spoke as Karen Barnes
- Cass Kroener as Jane
- Larry Sullivan as Leo
- Laura Brown as Debbie

== Episodes ==
No. overall	No. in season	Title	Directed by	Written by	Original release date	US viewers (millions)
31	1	"The Door to Freedom"	Steve Miner	Lizzy Weiss	January 7, 2013	1.70
Life is shaken up once again for the Kennish-Vasquez family when a woman from Angelo's past surfaces, claiming to be pregnant with his baby. However, only Bay and Toby know. Kathryn urges John to consider running as the Republican Party candidate for the Kansas state senate. Meanwhile, Bay is accused of cheating on her French exam and decides to attend Carlton. Daphne is still upset after all that happened with Jeff and snaps at Travis. She later apologizes and the twosome plot to start up a food truck business of Daphne's very own. Title reference: From the c. 1936 painting La clef des champs (English title: The Door to Freedom) by René Magritte.
32	2	"The Awakening Conscience"	Fred Gerber	Joy Gregory & Bekah Brunstetter	January 14, 2013	1.65
Bay enrolls in an experimental immersion program at Carlton for hearing students who have been learning sign language. She meets Teo, a fellow program participant, and finds herself on the outs with Natalie, who bullies her because she is hearing. John and Kathryn inform the family of John's plans to run for state senate. Elsewhere, Toby embarks on a romance with Nikki, but pulls back after Emmett shows him a distasteful picture of her on the Internet. Angelo tells Regina about his possible unborn child and Regina has a run-in with Lana, the other woman, in an elevator. Daphne opens her food truck for business, but is uncomfortable with decisions John is trying to make for her. A boy from her old neighborhood is upset when Daphne brings her truck to East Riverside. Title reference: From the 1853 painting The Awakening Conscience by William Holman Hunt.
33	3	"Duel of Two Women"	John Behring	Anne Kenney	January 21, 2013	1.74
Regina tells Adrianna and Daphne about Angelo and Lana's baby-to-be. Daphne takes it in stride and is supportive of Regina, suggesting a spa weekend for the two of them, paid for from her food truck profits. Bay finds herself on the wrong end of Natalie's wrath, forcing Melody to take everyone on a Tolerance Retreat to help bridge the divide between them. Bay bonds with Noah, who confides to her that he has Meniere's Disease, having already lost 60% hearing in his right ear, and is in the Pilot Program at Carlton so that he can learn to sign before he loses the rest of his hearing. Regina finds out from her new doctor that she has osteonecrosis in her right wrist and can never sign, paint, or be a hairdresser again, which leads to a falling-out with Melody, who thinks Regina is faking to get sympathy. Daphne tells Noah how upset she feels about her mom not being able to sign with her anymore. She asks him if he can imagine losing the ability to communicate with someone, but Noah passes on the opportunity to tell her that he has Meniere's Disease. However, he helps her understand her mother's point of view and stop being angry at her. After the retreat, Bay and Natalie declare a truce. Emmett is jealous of Bay's friendship with Noah and says he (Emmett) can't be friends with Bay any more because it hurts too much to not be with her. Meanwhile, Kathryn possibly hurts John's campaign during a radio interview by mentioning John's views on [legal] immigration, which John's political enemies use against him by claiming he is for illegal immigration. John believes he can win by staying away from specific issues before the election, and tells Kathryn to keep quiet about political issues from now on. Toby bonds with Lana and finds out that she is planning to give up her baby for adoption as she is in medical school and her family are all in Boston. Toby points out that she does have local family, his sister, Bay, who is also the baby's sister. Title reference: From the 1636 painting Duel of Two Women by Jusepe de Ribera.
34	4	"Dressing for the Charade"	Melanie Mayron	Chad Fiveash & James Stoteraux	January 28, 2013	1.76
Daphne gets the truth from Travis' mother regarding his so-called problems at home. Regina runs into an old friend, Zane, while out with Kathryn. John sees an attack ad on his campaign involving his wife's radio interview. Toby brings Lana to the Kennish house for dinner and she lets something slip to an immigration enforcement agent about carrying Angelo's baby. Title reference: From the 1886 painting Dressing for the Charade: The Children of Patrick Allan Fraser by Robert Herdman.
35	5	"The Acquired Inability to Escape"	Zetna Fuentes	Joy Gregory & Henry Robles	February 4, 2013	1.79
Daphne takes on more than she can handle while venturing into new territory. Toby goes to his grandfather hoping for a college recommendation. Kathryn volunteers to direct a play at Carlton. Regina sees Zane again. Title reference: From the 1991 sculpture The Acquired Inability to Escape by Damien Hirst.
36	6	"Human/Need/Desire"	Norman Buckley	Lizzy Weiss & Bekah Brunstetter	February 11, 2013	1.65
Bay hosts an anti-Valentine's Day party and invites her hearing and deaf friends, leading Noah and Travis to get into a heated argument. Angelo and Lana agree to a truce to chaperone the party. Regina butts heads with John and Kathryn over how to handle the situation with Daphne's food truck. Title reference: From the 1983 sculpture Human/Need/Desire by Bruce Nauman.
37	7	"Drive in the Knife"	Steve Miner	Chad Fiveash & James Stoteraux	February 18, 2013	1.52
Daphne breaks up with Travis. Afterwards, the police find the man who robbed the food truck but Travis lies when he is asked to ID the man. Daphne finds out that Travis wants personal revenge against the guy. Meanwhile, the Kennish kids are roped into helping out with John's campaign. Toby meets Elisa, a volunteer who turns out to be the daughter of the opposing candidate. Bay tells Emmett that she's in a new relationship, but he kisses her anyway. Regina is fired from her new job after the first day and turns to alcohol after being sober for many years. Title reference: From the 1943 painting Drive in the Knife by Roberto Matta.
38	8	"Tight Rope Walker"	Joanna Kerns	Anne Kenney & Henry Robles	February 25, 2013	1.69
While Toby bonds with Elisa, discord breaks out at Carlton when the deaf students oppose the pilot program for hearing students, leaving Daphne feeling caught in the middle. After she talks to the school board, she tells Kathryn that they have decided to close Carlton. Meanwhile, Bay tells Regina's old boyfriend Zane about Regina's alcohol abuse and Zane then tells Regina. Regina confronts Bay about telling Zane and angrily scolds her for it. Bay is severely hurt but forgives Regina for her outburst after she apologizes. The two then decide to keep it secret and Regina promises to go back to her meetings and get help. However, she goes back on her word when she leaves a voicemail for her sponsor and then deletes the message instead of sending it. Title reference: From the 1885 painting Tight-Rope Walker by Jean-Louis Forain.
39	9	"Uprising"	Steve Miner	Lizzy Weiss	March 4, 2013	1.63
Daphne leads her classmates in a protest against the closing of their school. Bay's efforts to join them are met with resistance. The uprising horrifies the parents and puts relationships at risk including Daphne and Bay's. Daphne finds out that Regina started drinking again. Melody is offered a position on the School Board. Title reference: From the 1860 painting The Uprising by Honoré Daumier.
40	10	"Introducing the Miracle"	Ron Lagomarsino	Becky Hartman Edwards & Lizzy Weiss	March 11, 2013	1.75
Daphne and the students of Carlton School for the Deaf find out if their protest will keep the school open and deaf. Lana goes into labor; Toby makes a surprise announcement; and John's campaign for office ends unexpectedly. Meanwhile, an intoxicated Regina shows up at Angelo's, and Emmett tells Bay about the kiss between Daphne and Noah. Title reference: From the 1916 painting Introducing the Miracle by Paul Klee
41	11	"Mother and Child Divided"	Ron Lagomarsino	Lizzy Weiss	June 10, 2013	1.66
Regina returns early from rehab, only to find that Daphne has grown closer to the Kennish family. Bay runs into her ex-boyfriend Ty; Travis and Emmett take advantage of Melody's absence and Kathryn and Nikki don't see eye to eye. Bay begins working at her dad's office. Title reference: From the 1993 artwork Mother and Child Divided by Damien Hirst
42	12	"Distorted House"	Fred Gerber	Joy Gregory & Henry Robles	June 17, 2013	1.62
Bay begins to reconnect with Ty but then learns shocking news about his experiences in Afghanistan. Toby and Travis both seek a managerial position at John's car wash. Kathryn and Daphne have a hard time coming to terms with Bay's desire to stay with Regina. Kathryn and Daphne become tennis partners in a tournament at the country club. Title reference: From the 2010 building The Distort House designed by TWS & Partners.
43	13	"The Good Samaritan"	Zetna Fuentes	Becky Hartman Edwards & Bekah Brunstetter	June 24, 2013	1.76
Toby and Nikki's relationship is strained by work and wedding planning so Bay tries to help Toby by booking a gig for Toby's band for the carnival to give him a temporary reprieve from the demands of adult life. Regina and Bay's messiness frustrates Angelo when he comes back from searching for his baby. Kathryn is unnerved by Adrianna's frequent visits; and Jace introduces Daphne to a new adventure. Title reference: From the 1890 painting The Good Samaritan by Vincent van Gogh.
44	14	"He Did What He Wanted"	Steve Miner	Lizzy Weiss & Michael Ross	July 1, 2013	1.61
Regina persuades the interior decorator who fired her to give her a second chance. Angelo joins the country club, and hires Regina to redecorate a restaurant he becomes a partner in. John's senate boss Chip Coto makes a pass at Kathryn and she tells John. Daphne and Jace learn Coto has been having an affair with an intern, and Jace anonymously texts him that his secret is known. John angrily confronts Regina, and tells her he will never forgive her for keeping Daphne from him for 13 years, then has a heart attack in the kitchen. Regina finds him, calls 911 and administers cardiopulmonary resuscitation
45	15	"Ecce Mono"	David Paymer	Chad Fiveash & James Stoteraux	July 8, 2013	2.02
In an alternative reality dreamt by John during his heart attack, Regina reveals the switch as soon as she learns of it. John sues her and wins exclusive custody of both three-year-old girls, obtaining a restraining order against her. Daphne Kennish is given a cochlear implant and 13 years later has turned into a typical "Buckner brat" with a C average who is best friends with Simone Sinclair, sleeps with college frat men, and steals her parents' credit card; while Bay has become an adopted, motivated, A-student wallflower. Toby retains his gambling problem. Kathryn has become a romance novelist and is sleeping with Chip Coto. Bay meets Emmett and with his help finds out about Regina. Daphne and Bay meet Adrianna and find out that Regina has died on their birthday, then angrily confront John. The dream ends with John again collapsing in the kitchen with a heart attack; he wakes up in the hospital, grateful to Regina for helping save his life. Title reference: From the restoration attempt Ecce Mono by Cecilia Giménez of the original c. 1930 fresco (mural painting) Ecce Homo by Elías García Martinez.
46	16	"The Physical Impossibility of Death in the Mind of Someone Living"	Melanie Mayron	Darla Lansu	July 15, 2013	1.75
Bay meets some of Ty's soldier friends, including an army medic named Aida whom Ty has slept with. Angelo offers Regina help in bringing in some business. After a family emergency, the Kennish family is going through some changes. John must face the reality of his situation. Daphne is torn between her family and her interest in being with Jace. The episode ending with Bay and Ty in Ty's room and Ty blows out the last candle and they sleep together. Title reference: From the 1991 art piece The Physical Impossibility of Death in the Mind of Someone Living by Damien Hirst.
47	17	"Prudence, Avarice, Lust, Justice, Anger"	Lea Thompson	Terrence Coli & Becky Hartman Edwards	July 22, 2013	1.76
A gay couple is introduced. Angelo invites Bay to join him at a pivotal meeting concerning the custody of his new baby. This tests their relationship when she originally declines to go, but Ty convinces her to go. When Daphne and Jace uncover Senator Coto's corruption and shameless philandering, they must decide what to do with the confidential information. Meanwhile, Nikki discovers that Toby and Simone have been in touch; and Emmett and Travis try to set Melody up on a blind date. Title reference: From the c. 1978 painting Prudence, Avarice, Lust, Justice, Anger by Jack Beal.
48	18	"As the Shadows Deepen"	Wendey Stanzler	Joy Gregory & Henry Robles	July 29, 2013	1.76
Bay decides to put on Deaf Day at Maui to bring in more customers, since the park has been losing business. She gets help from Emmett, which causes problems when Ty sees the two of them together. Daphne finds out that Jeff is now Jace's friend's fiancé and that the two were in a long-term relationship, despite Jeff's affair with Daphne. Red flags are raised about Jace after he tries to steal a credit card and tells Jeff's fiancé the truth. Toby suggests that Nikki visit the man who killed her father in prison to get closure. John starts to mend his relationship with his father. Bay learns that Ty is about to be deployed back to Afghanistan. Title reference: From the 2000 painting As the Shadows Deepened by Eyvind Earle.
49	19	"What Goes Up Must Come Down"	Joanna Kerns	Bekah Brunstetter & Lizzy Weiss	August 5, 2013	1.68
Daphne worries that Senator Coto is on to her and her frustration with Jace comes to a head when Parker shares some upsetting news. Nikki confronts her mom about her dad's history. Meanwhile, John continues to find ways to pay back Regina for saving his life; and Ty and Bay go camping as Emmett's father gets a cochlear implant. Title reference: From the 1994 art piece What goes up must come down by Damien Heist.
50	20	"The Merrymakers"	Zetna Fuentes	James Stoteraux & Chad Fiveash	August 12, 2013	1.60
Bay and Daphne throw Nikki an impromptu bachelorette party; while a call from Simone alters the course of Toby's bachelor party. Meanwhile, Kathryn is surprised at Jennice's extravagant wedding requests; and a change in living situation leads Angelo and Regina to reevaluate their relationship. Title reference: From the 1616-1917 painting Merrymakers at Shrovetide by Frans Hals.
51	21	"Departure of Summer"	Steve Miner	Becky Hartman Edwards & Lizzy Weiss	August 19, 2013	1.96
Toby prepares for his wedding and both his parents and Nikki's mom contemplate being truthful with him. Meanwhile, Daphne is forced to own up to her mistakes regarding her blackmail of Senator Coto. Angelo realizes that his baby belongs with Victor and Leo and makes a deal to still be part of her life. Bay seeks a long-distance romance with Ty in the face of his redeployment, however Ty learns that he'll be in even more dangerous territory this time around. To protect Bay from the truth, he breaks up with her using a terrible lie – one that leads Bay straight back into the arms of Emmett. Title reference: From the 1914 art piece Departure of Summer by Man Ray.

== Production ==
"Uprising", the season's ninth episode, was the first episode of a national mainstream scripted television series to be told almost entirely in American Sign Language (ASL), with open captions for hearing viewers. Series creator Lizzy Weiss described the innovative concept, stating:

I've been wanting to do an all-ASL episode since the series began, and the storyline we've been focusing on this season gave us the perfect opportunity. It's an exciting, visual, empowering story of kids who are different fighting back, and it allows our audience to experience the world as our deaf characters do. We've been building to this for 39 episodes and we're all thrilled to be the first to try this.

== Reception ==
=== U.S. ratings ===
No.	Episode	Original air date	Timeslot (EST)	Viewers (million)	Adults 18-49 rating	Cable rank (18–49)		Note
No.	Episode	Original air date	Timeslot (EST)	Viewers (million)	Adults 18-49 rating	Timeslot	Night	Note
1	"The Door to Freedom"	January 7, 2013	Monday 8:00PM	1.70	0.7	#6	#31	
2	"The Awakening Conscience"	January 14, 2013	Monday 8:00PM	1.65	0.7	#4	#22	
3	"Duel of Two Women"	January 21, 2013	Monday 8:00PM	1.74	0.7	#5	#37	
4	"Dressing for the Charade"	January 28, 2013	Monday 8:00PM	1.76	0.8	#4	#23	
5	"The Acquired Inability to Escape"	February 4, 2013	Monday 8:00PM	1.79	0.8	#3	#18	
6	"Human/Need/Desire"	February 11, 2013	Monday 8:00PM	1.65	0.7	#3	#22	
7	"Drive in the Knife"	February 18, 2013	Monday 8:00PM	1.52	0.6	#6	#37	
8	"Tight Rope Walker"	February 25, 2013	Monday 8:00PM	1.69	0.8	#4	#23	
9	"Uprising"	March 4, 2013	Monday 8:00PM	1.63	0.7	#4	#30	
10	"Introducing the Miracle"	March 11, 2013	Monday 8:00PM	1.75	0.8	#3	#22	
11	"Mother and Child Divided"	June 10, 2013	Monday 8:00PM	1.66	0.7	#3	#25	
12	"Distorted House"	June 17, 2013	Monday 8:00PM	1.62	0.7	#4	#19	
13	"The Good Samaritan"	June 24, 2013	Monday 8:00PM	1.76	0.7	#5	#23	
14	"He Did What He Wanted"	July 1, 2013	Monday 8:00PM	1.61	0.7	#3	#17	
15	"Ecce Mono"	July 8, 2013	Monday 8:00PM	2.02	0.9	#3	#15	
16	"The Physical Impossibility of Death in the Mind of Someone Living"	July 15, 2013	Monday 8:00PM	1.75	0.8	#5	#19	
17	"Prudence, Avarice, Lust, Justice, Anger"	July 22, 2013	Monday 8:00PM	1.76	0.8	#3	#23	
18	"As The Shadows Deepened"	July 29, 2013	Monday 8:00PM	1.76	0.7	#4	#22	
19	"What Goes Up Must Come Down"	August 5, 2013	Monday 8:00PM	1.68	0.7	#4	#34	
20	"Family Secrets in Plain View"	August 12, 2013	Monday 8:00PM	1.60	0.7	#4	#27	
21	"Departure of Summer"	August 19, 2013	Monday 8:00PM	1.96	0.8	#5	#29	
