= Switched at Birth season 1 =

Switched at Birth
- Season 1
- No. of episodes: 30

Release
- Original network: ABC Family
- Original release: June 6, 2011 – October 22, 2012

Season chronology
- Next → Season 2

The first season of Switched at Birth, an American drama television series, began airing on ABC Family on June 6, 2011, and concluded on October 22, 2012, after 30 episodes.

The one-hour scripted drama revolves around two young women who were switched at birth and grew up in very different environments. While balancing school, jobs, and their unconventional family, the girls, along with their friends and family experience deaf culture, relationships, classism, racism, audism, and other social issues.

On August 1, 2011, ABC Family announced that they were ordering more episodes for the first season of Switched at Birth, bringing the first season to a total of 30 episodes. The series continued with a winter premiere on January 3, 2012, ending on March 20, 2012, with 12 episodes. The series began airing its remaining 8 episodes for its first season, beginning September 3, 2012.

== Cast ==
=== Main ===
- Sean Berdy as Emmett Bledsoe
- Lucas Grabeel as Toby Kennish
- Katie Leclerc as Daphne Paloma Vasquez
- Vanessa Marano as Bay Madeleine Kennish
- Constance Marie as Regina Vasquez
- D. W. Moffett as John Kennish
- Lea Thompson as Kathryn Kennish

=== Recurring ===
- Ivonne Coll as Adrianna Vasquez
- Maiara Walsh as Simone Sinclair
- Austin Butler as James "Wilke" Wilkerson III
- Marlee Matlin as Melody Bledsoe
- Gilles Marini as Angelo Sorrento
- Sam Page as Craig Tebbe
- Justin Bruening as Jeff Reycraft
- Christopher Wiehl as Patrick
- Tania Raymonde as Zarra
- Blair Redford as Tyler "Ty" Mendoza
- Meeghan Holaway as Amanda Burke
- Ryan Lane as Travis Barnes
- Brandon Bell as Coach Medlock
- Anthony Natale as Cameron Bledsoe
- Charles Michael Davis as Liam Lupo
- Cassi Thomson as Nikki Papagus
- Carlease Burke as Ms. Rose
- Manish Dayal as Scuba
- Oliver Muirhead as Geraldo
- Jason Brooks as Bruce
- Tammy Townsend as Denise
- Robin Thomas as Dale
- Aaron Todd Kessee as Cheves
- TL Forsberg as Olivia
- Mario Ardila Jr. as Mouse
- Mat Vairo as Alex Rainford
- Tina Huang as Tina Choi
- Steven Connor as Mr. Thatcher
- Natalie Amenula as Monica
- Suanne Spoke as Karen Barnes
- Madison Saager as Heather
- Jackie Debatin as Sarah Lazar
- Meredith Baxter as Bonnie Tamblyn-Dixon
- Marianne Chambers as Leanne Cowley
- Nishi Munshi as Priya
- Justina Machado as Brizia Munos
- Ruth Livier as Margaret

== Episodes ==
No. overall	No. in season	Title	Directed by	Written by	Original release date	US viewers (millions)
1	1	"This Is Not a Pipe"	Steve Miner	Lizzy Weiss	June 6, 2011	3.30
Artistic and troubled Bay Kennish has grown up with her wealthy parents John and Kathryn and older brother Toby. Through a school experiment, she discovers that her blood type is different from her family's. After taking a DNA test, the Kennishes learn that she was in fact switched at birth with Daphne Vasquez, an athletic Deaf teen living with her single mother Regina and grandmother Adrianna on the other side of town. Bay discovers that she and her biological mother Regina have a lot in common, and the Kennishes have their first experiences with Deafness and Deaf Culture. After learning that Regina is in financial trouble, the Kennishes invite her and Daphne to move into their guest house. The Kennishes and Vasquezes must then learn to get along, while trying to get to know each other. Title reference: From the 1928–1929 painting The Treachery of Images by René Magritte, which has the caption "Ceci n'est pas une pipe", French for "This is not a pipe."
2	2	"American Gothic"	Steve Miner	Lizzy Weiss	June 13, 2011	2.92
John and Kathryn disapprove of Daphne getting rides from her best friend Emmett on his motorcycle. They take the issue up with Regina, who feels threatened. John and Kathryn also decide that they want to sue the hospital. Regina considers joining them but decides against it. When Liam (Bay's ex) visits Daphne at Carlton, Emmett becomes protective of her. Daphne and Liam go on a date to a music store, and they hit it off. However, they later run into two of Liam's friends who begin making jokes about Deafness. Emmett comes to pick up Daphne, and he forgives her for bailing on him. Meanwhile, Regina opens up to Bay about her past drinking problems. Title reference: From the 1930 painting American Gothic by Grant Wood.
3	3	"Portrait of My Father"	Michael Schultz	Becky Hartman Edwards	June 20, 2011	2.77
Bay begins asking questions about her biological father, which her grandmother and Regina refuse to answer. Regina insists that "the best thing that guy ever did was leave." Daphne and John bond over their love of basketball. Daphne loves this at first, as she has never had any 'father daughter moments' with her 'deadbeat adopted father,' but quickly becomes annoyed with John when he takes his coaching too seriously. John also meets Melody (Marlee Matlin), who is Emmett's mother and one of Regina's closest friends. Kathryn gets Regina a job at her friend's hair salon, and rumors fly regarding the Kennish-Vasquez living situation. Melody helps Regina overcome her worries regarding getting close to Bay. Kathryn admits the truth about Daphne and Bay to one of her friends, Denise, in order to end the rumor that John had an affair with Regina years before and Daphne is their 'love child.' Daphne gives Bay a photo of Regina when she was pregnant, which was taken by Bay's biological father. Title reference: From the 1970s painting Portrait of My Father by Stephen Kaltenbach.
4	4	"Dance Amongst Daggers"	Steve Miner	Chad Fiveash & James Stoteraux	June 27, 2011	2.80
Bay learns that Daphne is seeing her ex-boyfriend Liam, while Daphne, Kathryn, and Regina learn that Bay is seeing Ty. The truth about the switch and the gossip makes Kathryn uncomfortable after hearing a rumor that Daphne is John and Regina's love child. Bay feels like Daphne is trying to steal her life and gets upset after a Kennish family photo is taken without her in it. Emmett fills in as the drummer for Toby's band, 'Guitar Face.' He gets jealous when he finds out that Daphne is dating Liam, which results in an argument before he leaves. Daphne ends up breaking things off with Liam because of Bay and other outside pressure, and Regina hits it off with Denise's ex-husband Bruce. Title reference: From the 1881 painting Dance Amongst Daggers by James Tissot.
5	5	"Dogs Playing Poker"	Bethany Rooney	Joy Gregory	July 4, 2011	1.68
John catches Bay sneaking in after a night out with Ty and invites him to chili night, when Ty reveals that he has enlisted in the army and is leaving in three days. Daphne and Emmett play poker with Toby against Toby's friends, but Toby explodes on Daphne when she makes a wrong move. Regina and Bruce bond, and Bay tells Ty goodbye. Title reference: From the 1903 painting series Dogs Playing Poker by C.M. Coolidge.
6	6	"The Persistence of Memory"	James L. Conway	Henry Robles	July 11, 2011	2.63
Daphne joins an advanced cooking class at Buckner Hall, but soon comes across some difficulties because she is Deaf. This leads to Daphne becoming more self-conscious and insecure. Bay and Emmett bond while working together to find Bay's biological father, and they discover that his name is Angelo Sorrento. Elsewhere, Toby and Wilke draw up and enact a plan to steal a chemistry test in order to pay off their poker-playing debts. Title reference: From the 1931 painting The Persistence of Memory by Salvador Dalí.
7	7	"The Stag Hunt"	Michael Lange	Sean Reycraft	July 18, 2011	2.69
Bay believes she's uncovered her birth father's identity. She asks Daphne and Emmett to accompany her when she goes to meet him. Meanwhile, John and Kathryn suspect Regina is to blame for the hospital's recent action regarding their lawsuit. Bay finds out that the man she thought was her father isn't actually him. Regina talks to Toby about his addiction to poker, and he ends up taking responsibility for his actions. Daphne asks Emmett if something is going on with him and Bay, but he replies that nothing is. However, Emmett later tells a surprised Bay that he likes her and then proceeds to kiss her. Daphne unlocks and opens the guitar case that supposedly belonged to Bay's father after figuring out that the code is BAY. The contents reveal that Regina knew about the switch and has been keeping track of Bay for most of her life. Title reference: From the 1529 painting The Stag Hunt of Elector Frederick the Wise by Lucas Cranach.
8	8	"Pandora's Box"	Elodie Keene	Becky Hartman Edwards & Lizzy Weiss	July 25, 2011	3.14
Daphne discovers that Regina's guitar case has many pictures of Bay. Regina admits to Daphne that she knew about the switch since Daphne was three years old. Daphne turns to Wilke to escape this new turn of events. Meanwhile, Bay and Emmett's relationship becomes more serious. However, the two encounter some problems due to their communication barrier and the fact that Bay feels like Emmett puts Daphne before her. Daphne tells Emmett that Regina knew about the switch. John and Kathryn's lawyer prepares them for their trial by dredging up old family secrets. Elsewhere, Regina tries to contact her private investigator to find out who he told about the switch. Regina tries to get rid of the guitar case but can't part with it. Later, during the legal meeting John and Kathryn are shown evidence that Regina knew about the switch for years. Regina reveals to the Kennish family and Daphne that she found out about the switch when Angelo had a DNA test done before deciding to leave her and Daphne. Everyone is in shock. No one more so than Daphne, who doesn't know who she can trust anymore. Bay is in just as much pain, believing that her biological mom didn't want her. Bay turns to Emmett for comfort, and Regina leaves the Kennish house. Title reference: From the 1884 sketch Pandora (also known as Pandora's Box) by Frederick Stuart Church.
9	9	"Paradise Lost"	Ron Lagomarsino	Chad Fiveash & James Stoteraux	August 1, 2011	2.79
After revealing her secret, Regina tries to make amends with Daphne and Bay. Daphne decides to move in with her "real family." Meanwhile, Bay tells Emmett that for her birthday, she wants to see her art on a billboard and enlists his help. However, before they get the chance to put her art up, the pair are caught by the police and injured while climbing a barbed wire fence to get away. Bay also meets Emmett's mother Melody, who doesn't approve of their relationship. Melody's dislike of Bay is heightened when she discovers that Emmett has been injured while spending time with Bay, as well as that he wants to take speech therapy in order to better communicate with her. The girls celebrate their sixteenth birthdays with the Kennishes, the Vasquezes, and the Bledsoes. Regina shows up and is accepted into the party by Bay. Emmett gives Bay a scarf, which he later reveals to be a blindfold. He blindfolds Bay and takes her back to the billboard where he has put up her artwork. The two decide that it would be better if Bay told Daphne about them. However, when Bay approaches Daphne to tell her about the relationship, Daphne reveals that she has realized she has feelings for Emmett, leaving Bay in silent horror. Title reference: From the 1807 painting series Paradise Lost by William Blake.
10	10	"The Homecoming"	David Paymer	Lizzy Weiss	August 8, 2011	2.84
At a student art show at Buckner Hall, Bay finally meets Angelo (Gilles Marini), after he reveals that he found out about the switch through the newspaper. Daphne finds out that Bay is dating Emmett and that prompts her to tell him how she really feels. In the midst of their argument at the car wash, the two share a kiss before Emmett declares his loyalty to Bay, leaving Daphne feeling more alone than ever. Regina decides to open up her own salon, but soon hits a roadblock when she finds out that because of her past credit scores and other issues, she can't get a loan without a co-signer. Things take a turn for the worse when Bay brings Angelo home to meet the Kennishes, resulting in a heated dispute between him and John. Angelo meets Daphne for the first time since he left when she was three and while she's angry, she also demands answers. Angelo also tries to reconnect with Regina, who is still not over the fact that he left their family and didn't trust her when she told him that she didn't have an affair that resulted in Daphne. After his argument with Daphne, Emmett reveals his frustrations regarding deaf-hearing relationships to Bay. They later make up after Toby speaks to Emmett and Emmett uses his voice for the first time in years and says his first words to Bay. In the end, Toby and Wilke finally persuade Emmett to play the drums for Guitar Face once again for an upcoming music festival. And before leaving, Emmett kisses Bay silently angering Daphne. In the car, Wilke admits to Toby that he likes Daphne before they leave. When Bay asked Daphne if everything worked out, Daphne tells her that since Bay wasn't okay with her dating Liam, she will never be okay with her dating Emmett, stating that she won't give up on him like she has given up on many other things in her life putting Bay in an awkward state. Angelo shows up that night to tell Regina that he is not going back to Chicago and that he wants to start a new life with her, Bay and Daphne as Kathryn looks on through a nearby window. Title reference: From the 1885 painting The Homecoming by Jennie Augusta Brownscombe.
11	11	"Starry Night"	Steve Miner	Lizzy Weiss	January 3, 2012	2.74
Bay's old friend and Wilke's ex-girlfriend Simone (Maiara Walsh) flirts with Toby. Daphne follows Emmett to a music festival, hoping to get some private time with him; Bay crashes the festival because she hears that Daphne is there. Daphne opens up and lets out some much needed steam. Emmett doesn't want a girlfriend who uses deafness as a shield to protect him or one who does things for him because she does not think he can. Elsewhere, John requests that Regina be present when Bay sees Angelo again; and Kathryn secretly talks to a nurse who could assist in the lawsuit against the hospital. Regina and Bay meet up with Angelo and it does not go as planned. Title reference: From the 1889 painting The Starry Night by Vincent van Gogh.
12	12	"The Tempest"	Mel Damski	Anne Kenney	January 10, 2012	2.07
Bay tries to score points with Melody, but doesn't have much luck. Regina tries to help Bay with Melody at a game night, but it's not as easy as she expected which leads to Regina defending Bay and confronting Melody about her mistreatment of Bay. Meanwhile, Daphne tries to fit in with her new friend Simone. Simone dares Daphne to go over and kiss a guy. The guy is up for it, but his girlfriend is not as excited about this. Daphne decides to join Buckner's basketball team, in spite of John's disapproval. Kathryn considers writing a novel about her experiences. Emmett and Melody have a heart-to-heart talk and Emmett insists Bay is not changing him and he is evolving as a person and wishes she treat Bay better since "she's [his] girlfriend and is here to stay," and Melody agrees to be more supportive of the two. At the end a shocking twist occurs: Emmett ends up getting arrested late in the night as the cops slam him into the ground when he fails to respond to their verbal commands. Title reference: From the 1508 painting The Tempest (Giorgione) by Giorgione.
13	13	"Self-Portrait With Bandaged Ear"	Steve Miner	Becky Hartman Edwards	January 17, 2012	1.99
Melody attributes Emmett's troublemaking behavior to Bay when it turns out he was arrested for putting Bay's art piece on the billboard from "Paradise Lost," for her birthday present. Elsewhere, Regina becomes Angelo's business partner; Daphne's displeased with her basketball coach because she finds out they only put her on the team for a grant they give schools when they try to involve kids with disabilities in sports and on top of that, never allow her to play during a game; and Kathryn and John face a possible setback in their lawsuit because of their lawyer. Title reference: From the 1889 painting Self-Portrait with Bandaged Ear by Vincent van Gogh.
14	14	"Les Soeurs d'Estrées"	Arlene Sanford	Joy Gregory	January 24, 2012	1.90
Daphne and Bay unite to help Emmett save his beloved motorcycle when Melody insists that he sell it to pay off his fine. Elsewhere, Kathryn and John attempt to find a new lawyer for their case against the hospital. Angelo finds out that Regina had known about the switch for thirteen years and is outraged at the fact that she never came to him when she had first found out. After Bay and Daphne fail to save Emmett's motorcycle, he offers one of the girls one last ride. Daphne, as a gesture of her acceptance of Emmett and Bay's relationship, tells Bay to take the offer and watches with a saddened expression as the couple drive off. She later reconciles with Wilke. At the end of the episode, Emmett comes to his mother with $4,750 of the money to pay off his fine and with some shocking news - he's moving in with his dad, leaving her visibly stunned. Regina and Angelo seem to rekindle their relationship. Title reference: From the 1594 painting Gabrielle d'Estrées et une de ses soeurs by an unknown artist.
15	15	"Expulsion From the Garden of Eden"	Steve Miner	Chad Fiveash & James Stoteraux	January 31, 2012	1.93
Bay meets Emmett's father Cameron and his girlfriend Olivia and sees that they have a very different style of parenting than Melody. Daphne finally goes on a date with Wilke, but when she finds out he has taken other girls out on the same date, she questions whether she really means anything to him. Kathryn runs into Angelo at a farmer's market and decides to invite him over for a big family dinner. As Daphne is working in the car wash, she notices that John has a meeting in the cafe with an old friend named Sara Lazar. During dinner, Kathryn receives a phone call, finding out that Angelo is a fugitive. Bay and Emmett have an argument about Angelo. She later goes to see Angelo at his apartment and discovers that he's gone. She confronts John and Kathryn, suspecting that they have reported him to the police, but Adrianna admits that she reported him, leaving everyone in shock. Title reference: From the 1425 painting Expulsion from the Garden of Eden by Masaccio.
16	16	"Las Dos Fridas"	Chris Grismer	Henry Robles	February 7, 2012	1.82
Kathryn's mother Bonnie (Meredith Baxter) visits the family and bonds with Daphne though mainly over how she is one of the family by her blood and in result practically ignores Bay now "seeing her differently," since she isn't her biological grandchild and begins to treat her very differently now somewhat coldly. This forms a wedge between her and Bay as well as Kathryn, with Bonnie stating how Daphne is her "real" daughter and not Bay due to how she carried Daphne and the similarities between her and Daphne that she doesn't have with Bay. But Kathryn still feels that Bay will always be her daughter no matter what a blood test says. Meanwhile, Daphne meets up with Monica, a teenage Latina from her old neighborhood, who now also sees and treats her differently since she's moved out of their town, but Daphne still feels a strong connection with where she was raised. During all this, Bay and Regina look into Angelo's disappearance; and Toby realizes he can only please Simone if he changes. Title reference: From the 1939 painting Las Dos Fridas by Frida Kahlo.
17	17	"Protect Me From What I Want"	David Paymer	Becky Hartman Edwards & Lizzy Weiss	February 14, 2012	1.46
Regina arranges for Bay to meet an art dealer, only to discover that he is much more interested in her art than Bay's (and maybe interested in more than that itself), much to Bay's dismay, who wants to be discovered as an artist. Meanwhile, Kathryn mentions to Emmett that Bay was heartbroken after Ty's departure and how she suddenly got happy again after he came along, sparking some hidden jealousy in Emmett and causing a strain on his and Bay's relationship. Elsewhere, Daphne hopes to be a starter on her basketball team by winning the spot in a competition only to find out that Simone isn't the person she thought she was when a truth comes out about her missing watch, and Bay tells Daphne her story with Simone: they once video-taped a girl talking about her secret crush and against Bay's wishes, Simone posts it all over town, forcing the girl to leave school. Daphne is forced to make a hard decision determining where she will stand with her friend. During all this, John attempts to become closer to Toby, but isn't happy with his goals. In the end, Emmett and Bay share a heartfelt and big moment in their relationship which ends with them officially declaring they are in love. Title reference: From 1983–1985 text art series Protect Me From What I Want by Jenny Holzer.
18	18	"The Art of Painting"	Norman Buckley	Joy Gregory & Anne Kenney	February 21, 2012	1.79
Regina's artwork is entered in a gallery where she soon discovers the real reason why her art was chosen. Daphne finds herself the target of Simone's tactics. Emmett is having trouble with speech therapy and, under some advice by his father's girlfriend Olivia, begins to drink to ease his nerves. Emmett's troubles soon spiral further when Emmett soon reveals to Bay that he plans to drop out of school, and later on just settle for a GED, to become a photographer causing Bay to confide in Melody about her concerns for Emmett which has repercussions she wasn't suspecting. Kathryn meanwhile goes against John's wishes when she hands over money to a nurse who is in deep financial trouble, threatening their case. At Regina's art gallery, Emmett brings over his father and Olivia, where Melody is at also having tagged along with Bay and Regina. Things explode when Melody smells alcohol on Emmett's breath and she demands to know what's going on in her ex-husband's house hold, resulting in a huge fight breaking out in the gallery. Melody lets it slip about Emmett's intention to drop out of school, thereby accidentally revealing how Bay confided in her about the detail to Emmett angering him. In the end, Daphne's longing for her old school leads her to re-join Carlton discovering how the girls' basketball team was going to get cut due to a low budget and Bay and Emmett's relationship is greatly strained due to Bay's confiding in Melody and with Emmett, overall, being furious with Bay. Title reference: From the 1666 painting The Art of Painting by Johannes Vermeer.
19	19	"Write a Lonely Soldier"	Bethany Rooney	Chad Fiveash & James Stoteraux	February 28, 2012	1.51
Kathryn meets with Angelo's lawyer, who claims that Angelo has secret resources that have information on the hospital. Bay's worrying about Ty in Afghanistan brings out Emmett's jealous side, which causes another rift in their relationship. Daphne helps a new high school friend, Travis, get a job at the Kennish car wash after unintentionally getting him fired from his job at Carlton, but he soon causes some problems. She also tries to get Wilke to start signing. Meanwhile, Toby is torn between playing a gig with Guitar Face or going solo to play at a show Simone scored for him, but when Guitar Face's gig is suddenly canceled, he suspects that Simone had something to do with it. Title reference: From the 1975–1980 lithograph Write a Lonely Soldier by June Wayne.
20	20	"Game On"	Ron Lagomarsino	Becky Hartman Edwards & Lizzy Weiss	March 6, 2012	1.48
After hearing that the last team Carlton played against is disqualified, Daphne is excited to hear that they will now participate in the Springfield Tournament. However, there is a catch: their first opponent is Buckner. Bay is caught in Emmett's custody battle when Melody asks her to testify. Although she wants Emmett to make the right choice, after finding out about Olivia's stash of weed and Cameron's attitude towards the custody battle, she begins to really think through about her choice. In the end, Carlton wins the competition but despite this great win, the team is going to get cut due to financial reasons. When Bay confesses to Cameron about Olivia's weed and saying how Emmett's best choice should be important, he tells Emmett he is going to give Melody full custody since "Bay made sense." Emmett is furious. In his hotel room he confronts Bay about what she did in a phone call and Bay insists she only did what she did to protect him, but the phone call gets disconnected, making Emmett bang his wrist against the wall bruising it. Emmett goes to the ice vending machine to ice his bruise and in comes Simone. Upon seeing his bruised wrist, she offers to bandage it for him. After the call, Bay has a chat with Toby about how she thinks Emmett will never talk to her again because of what she did, and Toby assures her that Emmett will forgive her, telling her, "you guys are perfect together," while, in Simone's hotel room, Emmett sleeps with Simone. Title reference: From the 2006 painting Game On by Jack Vettriano.
21	21	"The Sleep of Reason Produces Monsters"	Elodie Keene	Joy Gregory & Henry Robles	March 13, 2012	1.70
Bay and Daphne team up to shoot an ASL zombie movie for Emmett's birthday. Kathryn is upset at John for sharing personal family information to Sarah Lazar, who she suspects had an affair with her husband. Emmett and Simone feel guilty about what they did together. Wilke finds out about what had happened between them and Emmett tells his mom that he had made a mistake with another girl. Melody asks him to decide if it is worth telling Bay. Daphne is also upset at the fact that she had missed out on so many Kennish family memories and blames Regina for not telling her about the switch earlier. They later reconcile during a late night swim. Regina finally agrees to help Kathryn write her book on the switch after they have a conversation about living in denial. Title reference: From the 1797–1799 etching The Sleep of Reason Produces Monsters by Francisco Goya.
22	22	"Venus, Cupid, Folly, and Time"	Michael Lange	Lizzy Weiss	March 20, 2012	1.71
It's prom time at Carlton School for the Deaf and Daphne plans to ask Wilke to be her date, while Emmett asks Bay. Wilke tells Daphne that he can't go because he has to finish writing a paper. She ends up inviting Travis to come with her as a friend. Craig and Kathryn go to interview a former hospital worker, who turns out to be crazy. Their car breaks down on the way back, and the two almost share a kiss before Kathryn pulls away. Meanwhile, Regina struggles with her feelings for Angelo after he suddenly calls from prison. He needs a lawyer to help him stay in the country. As she is already in a relationship with Patrick, she tells him that while the girls are allowed to make up their own minds about him, she isn't going to take him back. Daphne finds out from Wilke's father that he will be heading off to boarding school soon and is angry and hurt that he didn't tell her. Wilke surprises Daphne on prom night with a limo and Travis ends up joining them. At prom, Wilke is finally honest about him leaving, and Daphne storms off. She decides to make amends with him, however, after Bay convinces her to make the best of the night, and Wilke ends up telling her that Emmett had slept with Simone. She confronts Emmett, who denies it, but she can tell that he is lying. She struggles with whether to tell Bay or not, but decides to wait until after the prom. Emmett, on the other hand, decides to tell Bay about his mistake with Simone before she hears it from someone else. Bay gets upset that Emmett cheated on her. Angry and heartbroken, breaks up with Emmett and she leaves the prom, while Daphne and Wilke end their relationship on a high note. After meeting with Craig about Angelo, John informs Regina that the best way to keep Angelo in the country is for him to marry a U.S citizen. Title reference: From the c. 1546 Venus, Cupid, Folly, and Time by Agnolo Bronzino.
23	23	"This Is the Color of My Dreams"	Steve Miner	Lizzy Weiss	September 3, 2012	2.25
The show resumes at the beginning of the school year and Bay returns from her trip with a new boyfriend, Alex. Kathryn finally releases her book on the switch, which causes some problems in the Kennish household. Daphne lands a job at a restaurant with the help of Kathryn, but things do not go smoothly, as the head chef thinks that having a deaf person in the kitchen could raise hazards. After she is demoted to dish-washing, Kathryn tries to intervene. Bay is not completely over Emmett, especially after seeing a mural that he had painted of their relationship, and this leads to her breaking it off with Alex. Later, Bay and Emmett meet up and while he is deeply sorry about what had happened between him and Simone, Bay doesn't think that they could ever be the same. Meanwhile, Regina and the Kennishes have been trying to help Angelo stay in the country, but after he is ordered by a judge to be deported back to Italy, Regina steps in and decides to marry him the exact same day. Title reference: From the 1925 painting This Is the Color of My Dreams by Joan Miró.
24	24	"The Intruder"	Patrick Norris	Chad Fiveash & James Stoteraux	September 10, 2012	1.67
Regina tells everyone that she and Angelo are married. The Kennishes are shocked, but not as much as Adrianna, Regina's mother, who declares that Regina still loves him. Daphne takes the news of Angelo and Regina being married well, but she is getting out of the house and escaping at work. Regina also tells Patrick, but he leaves in frustration. Meanwhile, Bay helps Angelo look for an apartment. Angelo and Regina then go to an interview, and it goes well, except for the confusion of living arrangements. So it's decided that Angelo will move in with Daphne, Regina, and Adrianna. While working on a street piece, Bay meets Medusa, another street artist who finishes Bay's painting. Emmett and Daphne enter their movie, Dawn of the Deaf, in a film festival, and when Toby spots Emmett at their house he shoves him to the ground, revealing his frustrations. In the end of the episode, it's decided that Angelo instead will be moving in with the Kennishes, so that Bay may get to know him and Daphne will be given some space. Title reference: From the c. 1661 painting The Intruder by Gabriel Metsu.
25	25	"The Shock of Being Seen"	Steve Miner	Joy Gregory & Becky Hartman Edwards	September 17, 2012	1.58
Daphne causes an accident at work, damaging several cupcakes. She stays late to fix them and ends up developing a friendship with her boss, Jeff. Believing that he may like her, she dresses differently in an attempt to catch his attention, but is disappointed when he rejects her. Bay is grounded until she completes her homework, but manipulates Angelo into covering for her so she can sneak out and meet with a street art gang. She comes home late, worrying Angelo and John. Meanwhile, Kathryn is jealous when an interviewer on a segment about her book only shows interest in Regina's story. Later, the two of them visit a hospital and Kathryn discovers that a nurse working there may be a previous girlfriend of Angelo. John discovers graffiti at his car wash, which turns out to be Bay's artwork. Title reference: From the 2012 painting The Shock of Being Seen by Gor Sudan.
26	26	"Tree of Forgiveness"	David Paymer	Ariel Rubin & Michael V. Ross	September 24, 2012	1.41
The Kennish car wash is hosting a motorbike show. John expresses his hatred towards graffiti, which offends Bay, who has just joined the street art scene. Bay and Zarra are caught by the police while spray-painting, and the officer lets her off the hook when he learns of her famous father. Emmett meets a female racer, Robin, who shows interest in him, but he is still waiting for Bay. During a run-in with Emmett, Bay tells him about her feelings towards her father's disapproval of street art, and he tells her to tell John about her murals. John disapproves and Bay is distraught. Kathryn notices that Toby has been in a creative slump, so she tricks him into showing up at a church gig. She also tells Regina about the mysterious nurse at the hospital. Also, Angelo tries to make amends with Daphne, while Regina tries to help Simone, who is in emotional turmoil after the incident with Emmett. Title reference: From the 1882 painting The Tree of Forgiveness by Edward Burne-Jones.
27	27	"The Declaration of Independence"	Steve Miner	Anne Kenney	October 1, 2012	1.44
While at the restaurant, Daphne points out the chef, her crush, to Emmett, who immediately recognizes him as the mystery man who had hooked up with his mother. He confides in Bay, who tells him not to say anything, but she ends up doing so herself after she hears that Daphne and Jeff almost kissed. Melody is still flirting with Jeff. Carlton is having an event night and while catering, Jeff finds out how much younger Daphne is. In an attempt to make him jealous, Daphne agrees to a date with Travis, but she ends up standing him up to find Jeff back at the restaurant. John, who has been suspicious of Travis' home life, invites him to the batting cages. Kathryn thinks that Regina might be struggling financially. Toby goes back to the church for an event and asks Nikki out. The episode ends with Daphne and Jeff kissing. Title reference: From the 1817 painting Declaration of Independence by John Trumbull.
28	28	"We Are the Kraken of Our Own Sinking Ships"	Ron Lagomarsino	Henry Robles	October 8, 2012	1.56
Kathryn and John meet Zarra and immediately disapproves of her and Bay's friendship. To combat this, Kathryn invites Bay's brief boyfriend Alex and his parents over for dinner. Daphne and Jeff are now in a secret relationship. Another worker at the restaurant, Scuba, who has a crush on Daphne, messes up some shrimp and gets Daphne to take the blame for it, as he picked up clues on the chef taking a liking to her in particular. When Jeff finds out, Scuba is fired and on his way out, he tells the whole kitchen that Daphne is Jeff's girlfriend. At the dinner, John and Kathryn are annoyed by Alex's parents, who only seem to gloat about their college-bound son. Bay gets a call from Zarra at a local jail, asking Bay to help bail her out. Bay then drags Alex along with her as she tries to put together the $1,500 needed. Meanwhile, Regina and Patrick have reconnected, although he is still not over the fact that Regina is legally married to her ex-boyfriend. Also, Toby is thinking of starting a band again after another hangout with Nikki, whom he seems to like. He also has a change of heart about Emmett and wants to start the band again. Title reference: From the 2012 painting We Are the Kraken of Our Own Sinking Ships by David Nixon.
29	29	"The Trial"	Bethany Rooney	Joy Gregory & Becky Hartman Edwards	October 15, 2012	1.45
Daphne and Jeff have been hanging out a lot more. Bay tries to find a way to get back the money she stole from her father before he checks his safe. Travis is worried because his job is on the line. The trial between the Kennishes and the hospital begins, with Angelo back in town to testify. Melody shows up at Jeff's house one night to retrieve her sunglasses and notices that Daphne's car is in the driveway, putting two-and-two together about their secret relationship. Daphne later reveals to Bay that she was about to take the next step with Jeff, and to Bay's surprise, it wouldn't have been her first time. Melody confronts Daphne about her relationship with Jeff, but Daphne is convinced that she was just jealous. Out of desperation, Bay borrows money from Simone, who is still trying to redeem herself to Bay. Meanwhile, Toby, Nikki, and Emmett start up their band, only to have Nikki back out because of her boyfriend's disapproval. Emmett convinces Toby to get her back. Due to her conscience and Daphne's insistence, Bay tells Kathryn about the money incident, which ends up causing a huge rift between her and her parents. At the end of the episode, it is implied that Daphne slept with Jeff and Bay is shown moving in with Zarra. Title reference: From the 1947 painting The Trial by Sidney Nolan.
30	30	"Street Noises Invade the House"	Steve Miner	Lizzy Weiss	October 22, 2012	1.78
Daphne is confronted by the restaurant owner about her involvement with Jeff, but she denies everything. Both of their jobs are in jeopardy. Bay has no plans on returning home anytime soon, but she calls Toby for help when a street gang comes looking for Zarra. Kathryn is called up to testify for the other side of the case, as she stated in her book that the switch wasn't a completely bad event, since she got to know Bay. Daphne makes matters worse for herself and Jeff when she decides to quit her job so that she and him could be together without repercussions. Jeff doesn't feel the same way when Daphne declares her love for him and they break up. Meanwhile, Bay and Zarra make a run for Mexico to meet up with Zarra's famous street artist father. She runs into Emmett right before she leaves her house and he picks up on her intentions. John (with his tracking device) and Emmett go looking for Bay and finds her sleeping in the back of her car at an abandoned parking lot in the middle of the night. After talking it out, John and Bay seem to be on better terms. Bay and Emmett have a moment in which she realizes that he really cares about her. When Angelo finds out that an older man had taken advantage of Daphne, he shows up at Maize and punches Jeff in the face. The outcome of the trial is determined: the Kennishes win the case, being awarded only $1, while Angelo also wins his case, receiving $5 million from the hospital. Toby points out to Regina that half of that money is legally hers now. When everyone has filed out of the courtroom, Daphne and Bay reminisce about their lives the day before they found out they were switched, mentioning how they must have seen each other before at a familiar pizza place. Then, an unknown pregnant woman walks into the courtroom asking for Angelo, causing Bay and Daphne much confusion. Title reference: From the 1911 painting The Street Enters the House by Umberto Boccioni.

== Reception ==
=== U.S. Ratings ===
#	Episode	Original air date	Timeslot (EST)	Viewers (millions)	Adults 18-49 rating
1	"This Is Not a Pipe"	June 6, 2011	Monday 9:00PM	3.30	1.3
2	"American Gothic"	June 13, 2011	Monday 9:00PM	2.92	1.2
3	"Portrait of My Father"	June 20, 2011	Monday 9:00PM	2.77	1.0
4	"Dance Amongst Daggers"	June 27, 2011	Monday 9:00PM	2.80	1.2
5	"Dogs Playing Poker"	July 4, 2011	Monday 9:00PM	1.68	0.7
6	"The Persistence of Memory"	July 11, 2011	Monday 9:00PM	2.53	0.9
7	"The Stag Hunt"	July 18, 2011	Monday 9:00PM	2.69	1.0
8	"Pandora's Box"	July 25, 2011	Monday 9:00PM	3.14	1.3
9	"Paradise Lost"	August 1, 2011	Monday 9:00PM	2.79	1.2
10	"The Homecoming"	August 8, 2011	Monday 9:00PM	2.84	1.3
11	"Starry Night"	January 3, 2012	Tuesday 8:00PM	2.74	1.0
12	"The Tempest"	January 10, 2012	Tuesday 8:00PM	2.07	0.9
13	"Self-Portrait With Bandaged Ear"	January 17, 2012	Tuesday 8:00PM	1.99	0.7
14	"Les Soeurs d'Estrées"	January 24, 2012	Tuesday 8:00PM	1.90	0.8
15	"Expulsion From the Garden of Eden"	January 31, 2012	Tuesday 8:00PM	1.93	0.8
16	"Las Dos Fridas"	February 7, 2012	Tuesday 8:00PM	1.82	0.7
17	"Protect Me From What I Want"	February 14, 2012	Tuesday 8:00PM	1.46	0.6
18	"The Art of Painting"	February 21, 2012	Tuesday 8:00PM	1.79	0.8
19	"Write a Lonely Soldier"	February 28, 2012	Tuesday 8:00PM	1.51	0.7
20	"Game On"	March 6, 2012	Tuesday 8:00PM	1.48	0.7
21	"The Sleep of Reason Produces Monsters"	March 13, 2012	Tuesday 8:00PM	1.70	0.8
22	"Venus, Cupid, Folly, and Time"	March 20, 2012	Tuesday 8:00PM	1.71	0.8
23	"This Is the Color of My Dreams"	September 3, 2012	Monday 8:00PM	2.25	0.9
24	"The Intruder"	September 10, 2012	Monday 8:00PM	1.67	0.8
25	"The Shock of Being Seen"	September 17, 2012	Monday 8:00PM	1.59	0.7
26	"Tree of Forgiveness"	September 24, 2012	Monday 8:00PM	1.41	0.6
27	"The Declaration of Independence"	October 1, 2012	Monday 8:00PM	1.44	0.6
28	"We Are the Kraken of Our Own Sinking Ships"	October 8, 2012	Monday 8:00PM	1.56	0.7
29	"The Trial"	October 15, 2012	Monday 8:00PM	1.45	0.6
30	"Street Noises Invade the House"	October 22, 2012	Monday 8:00PM	1.78	0.8
