= Lea Thompson filmography =

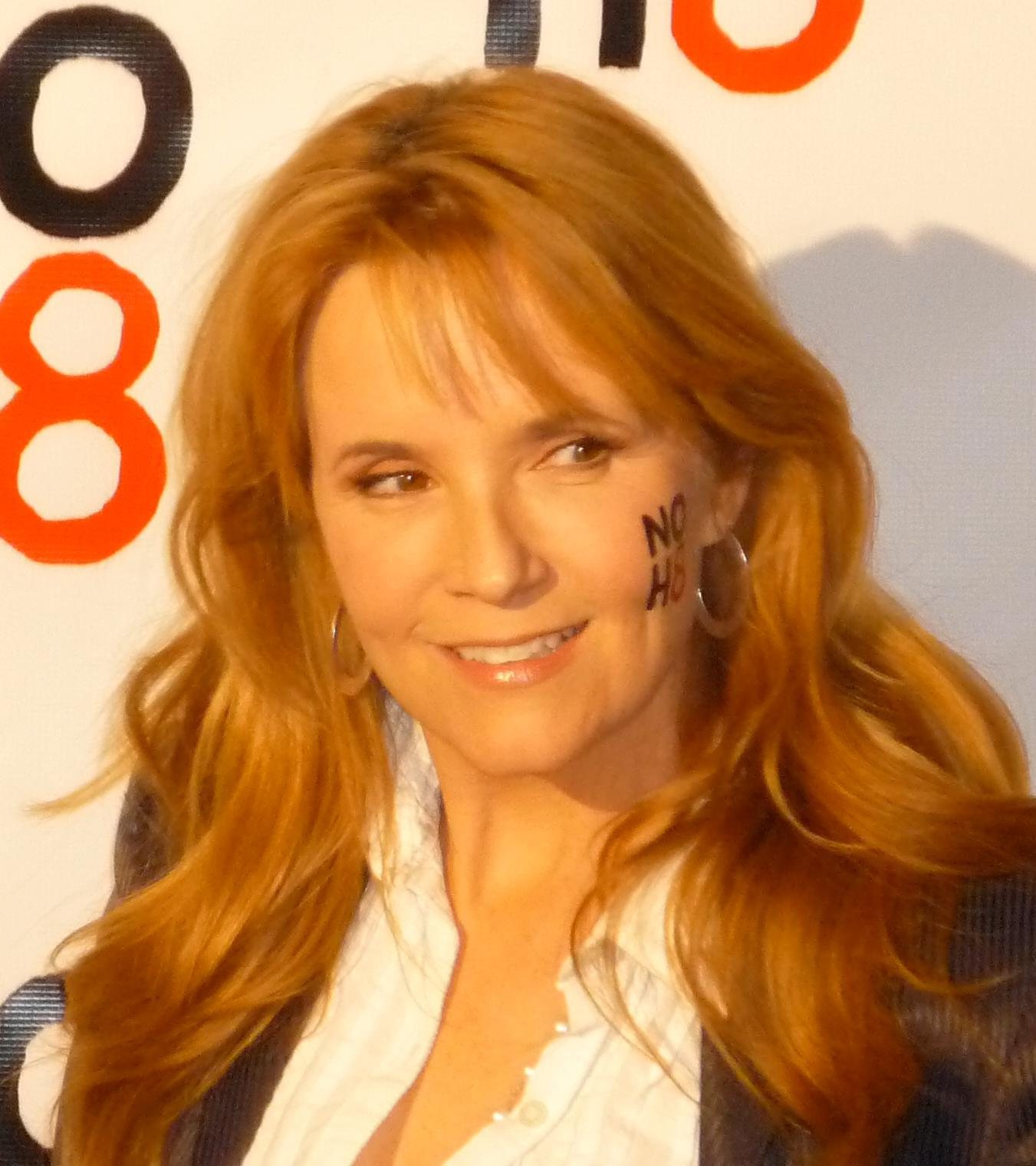
- Thompson at the 2009 NOH8 campaign
- Occupations: Actress, director
- Years active: 1982–present

American actress Lea Thompson has performed in many well-known films and television series since the 1980s, among them Howard the Duck, the Back to the Future trilogy and Caroline in the City. She has directed for television since 2006.

== Filmography ==
=== Film ===
Year	Title	Role	Notes
1982	MysteryDisc: Murder, Anyone?	Cecily 'Sissy' Loper	Video
1983	Jaws 3-D	Kelly Ann Bukowski	
1983	All the Right Moves	Lisa Lietzke	
1984	Red Dawn	Erica Mason	
1984	The Wild Life	Anita	
1985	Back to the Future	Lorraine Baines-McFly	
1986	SpaceCamp	Kathryn Fairly	
1986	Howard the Duck	Beverly Switzler	
1987	Some Kind of Wonderful	Amanda Jones	
1988	Casual Sex?	Stacy	
1988	Yellow Pages	Marigold de la Hunt	AKA Going Undercover
1988	The Wizard of Loneliness	Sybil	
1989	Back to the Future Part II	Lorraine McFly	
1990	Back to the Future Part III	Maggie McFly / Lorraine McFly	
1992	Article 99	Dr. Robin Van Dorn	
1993	Stolen Babies	Annie Beales	
1993	Dennis the Menace	Mrs. Alice Mitchell	
1993	The Beverly Hillbillies	Laura Jackson	
1994	The Little Rascals	Ms. Roberts	
1998	The Unknown Cyclist	Melissa Cavatelli	AKA 4 for the Road
2002	Fish Don't Blink	Clara	
2003	Haunted Lighthouse	Peg Van Legge	Short film
2003	Stealing Christmas	Sarah Gibson	
2005	Come Away Home	Carol	
2006	10 Tricks	Grace	
2007	California Dreaming	Ginger Gainor	AKA Out of Omaha
2008	Spy School	Claire Miller	AKA Doubting Thomas
2008	Senior Skip Day	Cathleen Harris	Video, DVD title: High School's Day Off
2008	Exit Speed	Maudie McMinn	
2009	Fatal Secrets	Rebecca	AKA Balancing the Books, also associate producer
2009	The Check	Darla	Short film, ACME Comedy
2009	Rock Slyde	Master Bartologist	DVD title: Rock Slyde: Private Eye
2009	Splinterheads	Susan Frost	
2010	Adventures of a Teenage Dragon Slayer	Laura	AKA I Was a 7th Grade Dragon Slayer
2010	Pork Chop Night	—	Short, associate producer
2011	Thin Ice	Jo Ann Prohaska	AKA The Convincer
2011	Mayor Cupcake	Mary Maroni	Also executive producer
2011	The Trouble with the Truth	Emily	Also producer
2011	J. Edgar	Lela Rogers	
2014	Ping Pong Summer	Crandall Miracle	
2014	Left Behind	Irene Steele	
2015	The Wrong Side of Right	Liz	
2017	Literally, Right Before Aaron	Deb	
2017	Who We Are Now	Alana	
2017	The Year of Spectacular Men	Deb Klein	Also director
2018	Sierra Burgess Is a Loser	Mrs. Burgess	
2018	Little Women	Margaret "Marmee" March	
2019	You Are Here	Helen	
2020	Dinner in America	Betty	
2021	Mark, Mary & Some Other People	Aunty Carol	
2022	Unplugging	Brenda Perkins	

=== Television ===
Year	Title	Role	Notes
1989	Nightbreaker	Sally Matthews	AKA Advance to Ground Zero, TV film
1989	Tales from the Crypt	Sylvia Vane	Episode: "Only Sin Deep"
1990	Montana	Peg Guthrie	TV film
1993	Stolen Babies	Annie Beales	AKA Stolen Children, TV film
1994	The Substitute Wife	Amy Hightower	AKA The Substitute, TV film
1995	The Unspoken Truth	Brianne Hawkins	AKA Living the Lie, TV film
1995	Friends	Caroline Duffy	Episode: "The One with the Baby on the Bus", uncredited
1995–1999	Caroline in the City	Caroline Duffy	97 episodes, also producer on 22 episodes
1996	The Right to Remain Silent	Christine Paley	TV film
1998	A Will of their Own	Amanda Steward	AKA Daughters of the New World, pilot episode
2002	Electric	Geri Meyers	Also producer
2002–2003	For the People	Chief Dep. Dist. Atty. Camille Paris	18 episodes
2003	Stealing Christmas	Sarah Gibson	TV film
2004	Ed	Liz Stevens	3 episodes
2004	Law & Order: SVU	Michelle Osborne	Episode: "Birthright"
2005	Jane Doe: Vanishing Act	Cathy Davis/Jane Doe	Jane Doe TV anthology
2005	Jane Doe: Now You See It, Now You Don't	Cathy Davis/Jane Doe	Jane Doe TV anthology
2005	Jane Doe: Til Death Do Us Part	Cathy Davis/Jane Doe	Jane Doe TV anthology
2005	Jane Doe: The Wrong Face	Cathy Davis/Jane Doe	Jane Doe TV anthology
2006	Jane Doe: Yes, I Remember It Well	Cathy Davis/Jane Doe	Jane Doe TV anthology
2006	Jane Doe: The Harder They Fall	Cathy Davis/Jane Doe	Jane Doe TV anthology
2007	Jane Doe: Ties That Bind	Cathy Davis/Jane Doe	Jane Doe TV anthology
2007	A Life Interrupted	Debbie Smith	AKA The Debbie Smith Story, TV film
2007	Jane Doe: How to Fire Your Boss	Cathy Davis	Jane Doe TV anthology
2007	Final Approach	Alicia Bender	AKA Highjack, TV film
2008	Jane Doe: Eye of the Beholder	Cathy Davis/Jane Doe	
2008	Head Case	Herself	Also writer on episode: "El Finks"
2008	The Christmas Clause	Sophie	AKA The Mrs. Clause, TV film
2010	Greek	April Jones	Episode: "Camp Buy Me Love"
2010	Uncle Nigel	Abby Wells	TV film
2011	Robot Chicken	Lorraine Baines	Episode: "Major League of Extraordinary Gentlemen", voice
2011	The Cabin	Lily MacDougall	TV film
2011	Game of Your Life	Abbie	TV film
2011–2017	Switched at Birth	Kathryn Kennish	73 episodes, also director on 4 episodes
2012	Love at the Christmas Table	Elissa Beth Dixon	AKA It's a Wonderful Lifetime, TV film
2013	Call Me Crazy: A Five Film	Julia	Television film, segment: "Eddie"
2013	Family Guy	Lorraine McFly	Voice, episode: "Finders Keepers"
2013	CSI: Crime Scene Investigation	Jennifer Rhodes	Episode: "Under a Cloud"
2014	My Mother's Future Husband	René Henderson	
2014	A to Z	Herself	Episode: "'A' is for Acquaintances"
2014–2017	Penn Zero: Part-Time Hero	Vonnie Zero	Voice, recurring role
2015	The Muppets	Herself	Episode: 2
2016	Whose Line is it Anyway?	Herself	Episode: 15
2016	American Dad!	Caroline Duffy	Voice, Episode: 217
2016	Cupcake Wars	Herself / Contestant	Season 10, Episode 6: 'Celebrity: Cheerleader Cupcakes'
2016–2017	Scorpion	Veronica Dineen	4 episodes
2018	Over the Hill	Sally	TV film
2018	Culture Clash	Lisa	TV film
2020	The Goldbergs	Fran Mikowitz	Episode: "The Return of the Formica King"
2020	The George Lucas Talk Show	Herself	Episode: "The Empire Strikes Duck"
2021	Expedition: Back to the Future	Herself	TV series
2021	Next Stop, Christmas	Evelyn Reynolds	Hallmark television film
2022	Star Trek: Picard	Dr. Diane Werner	Episode: "Fly Me to the Moon"
2023	The Spencer Sisters	Victoria Spencer	Main role
2023	Invincible	Carol	Voice, Season 2
2024	The Chicken Sisters	Nancy Hiller	Series regular

=== Director/Producer ===
Year	Title	Notes
2006	Jane Doe: The Harder They Fall	Television film
2008	Jane Doe: Eye of the Beholder	Television film
2013–2017	Switched at Birth	4 episodes
2016–2023	The Goldbergs	10 episodes
2017	The Year of Spectacular Men	Also portrayed: Deb Klein
2018	American Housewife	Episode: "The Venue"
2018	Mom	Episode: "Esta Loca and a Little Kingdom"
2019–2020	Schooled	6 episodes
2019	The Kids Are Alright	Episode: "Mass for Shut-Ins"
2020	Young Sheldon	Episode: "Body Glitter and a Mall Safety Kit"
2020	Katy Keene	Episode: "Chapter Eleven: Who Can I Turn To?"
2020–2022	Stargirl	5 episodes
2022	Star Trek: Picard	2 episodes
2022–2024	Resident Alien	3 episodes
2023–2025	Will Trent	3 episodes
2025	The Chicken Sisters	2 episodes
2026	Anna Pigeon	Executive producer and 4 episodes director

=== Video games ===
Year	Title	Notes
2008	CR: Back to the Future	Lorraine Baines
2012	Mystery Case Files: Shadow Lake	Cassandra Williams

=== Music videos ===
Year	Title	Artist
2022	"Life is What We're Living (Mahalo Remix)"	Riotron

== See also ==
- List of 1989 box office number-one films in the United States
- List of 1990 box office number-one films in the United States
