= John Stimpson (filmmaker) =

American filmmaker

John Stimpson is an American filmmaker, screenwriter and producer based in Massachusetts. He has directed independent feature films and television movies including The Legend of Lucy Keyes (2006), A Christmas Kiss (2011), Sexting in Suburbia (2012), Ghost Light (2018), Christmas on Ice (2020) and A Cherry Pie Christmas (2025).

== Early life and education ==
Stimpson grew up in Massachusetts. He spent his childhood in Wellesley before attending Harvard College where he was president of the Hasty Pudding Theatricals. He moved to Los Angeles after graduation and worked as an actor and a freelance script reader for five years. He then returned to Massachusetts and began working in television and ultimately independent films.

== Career ==
His first feature was the 2004 political drama, The Gentleman from Boston, which he co-directed with former Massachusetts Secretary of the Commonwealth, Michael J. Connolly. It was later released as Beacon Hill. The Legend of Lucy Keyes followed starring Julie Delpy, Justin Theroux, Brooke Adams and Mark Boone Junior. The film premiered at the Santa Barbara International Film Festival in 2006 and received a review in Variety.

He then began working with MarVista Entertainment directing a string of movies for cable television. The first was A Christmas Kiss (2011) written by Joany Kane. Sexting in Suburbia (2012), co-written by Stimpson and Marcy Holland and Last Hours in Suburbia, also written by Holland, followed. Then came The March Sisters at Christmas (2012), Sins of the Preacher (2013), Betrayed (2014) and The Wrong Car (2016).

In 2018 Stimpson co-wrote with Geoffrey Taylor and directed the supernatural comedy Ghost Light (2018). The film featured an ensemble cast including Cary Elwes, Carol Kane, Roger Bart, Shannyn Sossamon, Tom Riley and Danielle Campbell. Ghost Light premiered at the LA Film Festival and won the Dark Matters Feature Jury Award at the Austin Film Festival.

His company, H9 Films is Worcester, Massachusetts-based and most of his films have been produced in the Commonwealth. Cape Cod has been a repeated location used in his films. Both Cape Cod Life and Boston Magazine profiled him and his Massachusetts-based production model.

Stimpson later directed a series of holiday films: Christmas à la Mode (2019), Christmas on Ice (2020), A Cape Cod Christmas (2021), Letters to Santa (2023) and A Very Vermont Christmas (2024). Boston Magazine wrote an article about the state of the Massachusetts film industry while production of A Very Vermont Christmas was underway in Princeton, Massachusetts. A Cherry Pie Christmas (2025) was filmed in Door County, Wisconsin.

Starting with Christmas à la Mode, Stimpson began a multi-film collaboration with actress Katie Leclerc who appears in five of his films.

== Selected directing filmography ==
Year	Film
2004	Beacon Hill
2006	The Legend of Lucy Keyes
2011	A Christmas Kiss
2012	Sexting in Suburbia
2012	Last Hours in Suburbia
2012	The March Sisters at Christmas
2012	A Deadly Obsession
2013	Sins of the Preacher
2014	Betrayed
2016	The Wrong Car
2017	The Spruces and the Pines
2018	Ghost Light
2019	Christmas à la Mode
2020	Christmas on Ice
2021	A Cape Cod Christmas
2021	A Playful Romance
2023	Letters to Santa
2024	A Very Vermont Christmas
2025	A Cherry Pie Christmas
