= Ed Amatrudo =

American actor (born 1956)

- Born: February 9, 1956 (age 70)
- Education: American Academy of Dramatic Arts
- Occupation: Actor
- Years active: 1989–present

Edward Amatrudo (born February 9, 1956) is an American actor, perhaps best known for his role as Glenn Goodman, Juliette Barnes's manager, in the ABC television drama series, Nashville. He appeared on a recurring basis starting with the pilot episode, aired in October 2012.

== Career ==
Amatrudo graduated from American Academy of Dramatic Arts and in the 1980s and 90s appeared in a number of theatre and screen productions.

His feature film roles include Chains of Gold (1991), Traces of Red (1992), Wrestling Ernest Hemingway (1993), Drop Zone (1994), Bad Boys (1995), Up Close & Personal (1996) and Bully (2001), among others

On television, he guest-starred on Walker, Texas Ranger (1997), Profiler (1998), Chicago Hope (1999), and NYPD Blue (1999).

In 2000s, Amatrudo worked as real estate broker in Nashville.

In 2010s, he returned to acting, appearing in Drop Dead Diva (2010) and Army Wives (2011) before his role in Nashville (2012–18). Amatrudo also played the role of Clive Davis in the television film, CrazySexyCool: The TLC Story (2013). In 2022, he made a guest appearance in the 4th season of Stranger Things.

== Filmography ==
=== Film ===
- 1991: Chains of Gold – Peter
- 1991: Popcorn – Boy Friend
- 1992: Traces of Red – Emilio
- 1993: Wrestling Ernest Hemingway – Henry's Dad
- 1994: Drop Zone – Detective Fox
- 1995: Bad Boys – Ether Van Boss
- 1996: Up Close & Personal – Miami Reporter
- 2001: Bully – Mr. Kent
- 2016: Blue Mountain State: Rise of Thadland
- 2017: Catastrópico – Mark Stevens
- 2018: One Last Thing – Dr. Richards
- 2020: The Secrets We Keep – Albert Sonnderquist
- 2021: A Week Away – Mark
- 2022: Best Laid Plans – Chief McCoy
- 2025: The Alto Knights – Rudolph Halley
- 2025: A Cherry Pie Christmas – Brian Parker

=== Television ===
Ed Amatrudo television credits
Year	Title	Role	Notes	Ref.
1989	Miami Vice	Tommy T.	1 episode	
1996	Hello, She Lied	Lawyer Hayes	TV movie, aka Miami Hustle	
1997	Walker, Texas Ranger	Lloyd Becker	1 episode	
1998	Profiler	Craig Spaulding	1 episode	
1999	Chicago Hope	Dr. Donald Berlinger	1 episode	
1999	NYPD Blue	Carl Epstein	2 episodes	
2010	Drop Dead Diva	Gordon Leith	1 episode	
2011	Army Wives	Dr. George Kane	1 episode	
2012–2018	Nashville	Glenn Goodman	Regular cast	
2013	CrazySexyCool: The TLC Story	Clive Davis	TV movie	
2014	Halt and Catch Fire	Professor	1 episode	
2018	Chicago Fire	Roger Norwood	1 episode	
2019	The Resident	Ted Harris	1 episode	
2022	Stranger Things	Director Hatch	1 episode	
2024, 2025	Found	James Trent	2 episodes	
