= List of Switched at Birth episodes =

Switched at Birth is an American television drama series which premiered on ABC Family on June 6, 2011. Created by Lizzy Weiss, the series follows two teenage girls who learn that they were switched at birth. On August 17, 2012, ABC Family renewed Switched at Birth for a second season, which premiered on January 7, 2013. All of the episode titles take their names from pieces of artwork. On July 30, 2013, ABC Family renewed the series for a full 22-episode third season, which premiered in January 2014. The second half of season 3 premiered on June 16, 2014. On August 13, 2014, the series was renewed for a fourth season, which premiered on January 6, 2015. ABC Family, which changed its name to Freeform in January 2016, announced on Wednesday October 21, 2015, that it had renewed the series for a fifth and final season. The fifth season began airing on January 31, 2017, and concluded on April 11, 2017.

During the course of the series, 103 episodes of Switched at Birth aired over five seasons.

== Series overview ==
Season	Episodes	Originally released	
Season	Episodes	First released	Last released
1	30	June 6, 2011	October 22, 2012
2	21	January 7, 2013	August 19, 2013
3	22	January 13, 2014	December 8, 2014
4	20	January 6, 2015	October 26, 2015
5	10	January 31, 2017	April 11, 2017

== Episodes ==
=== Season 1 (2011–12) ===
No. overall	No. in season	Title	Directed by	Written by	Original release date	US viewers (millions)
1	1	"This Is Not a Pipe"	Steve Miner	Lizzy Weiss	June 6, 2011	3.30
2	2	"American Gothic"	Steve Miner	Lizzy Weiss	June 13, 2011	2.92
3	3	"Portrait of My Father"	Michael Schultz	Becky Hartman Edwards	June 20, 2011	2.77
4	4	"Dance Amongst Daggers"	Steve Miner	Chad Fiveash & James Stoteraux	June 27, 2011	2.80
5	5	"Dogs Playing Poker"	Bethany Rooney	Joy Gregory	July 4, 2011	1.68
6	6	"The Persistence of Memory"	James L. Conway	Henry Robles	July 11, 2011	2.63
7	7	"The Stag Hunt"	Michael Lange	Sean Reycraft	July 18, 2011	2.69
8	8	"Pandora's Box"	Elodie Keene	Becky Hartman Edwards & Lizzy Weiss	July 25, 2011	3.14
9	9	"Paradise Lost"	Ron Lagomarsino	Chad Fiveash & James Stoteraux	August 1, 2011	2.79
10	10	"The Homecoming"	David Paymer	Lizzy Weiss	August 8, 2011	2.84
11	11	"Starry Night"	Steve Miner	Lizzy Weiss	January 3, 2012	2.74
12	12	"The Tempest"	Mel Damski	Anne Kenney	January 10, 2012	2.07
13	13	"Self-Portrait With Bandaged Ear"	Steve Miner	Becky Hartman Edwards	January 17, 2012	1.99
14	14	"Les Soeurs d'Estrées"	Arlene Sanford	Joy Gregory	January 24, 2012	1.90
15	15	"Expulsion From the Garden of Eden"	Steve Miner	Chad Fiveash & James Stoteraux	January 31, 2012	1.93
16	16	"Las Dos Fridas"	Chris Grismer	Henry Robles	February 7, 2012	1.82
17	17	"Protect Me From What I Want"	David Paymer	Becky Hartman Edwards & Lizzy Weiss	February 14, 2012	1.46
18	18	"The Art of Painting"	Norman Buckley	Joy Gregory & Anne Kenney	February 21, 2012	1.79
19	19	"Write a Lonely Soldier"	Bethany Rooney	Chad Fiveash & James Stoteraux	February 28, 2012	1.51
20	20	"Game On"	Ron Lagomarsino	Becky Hartman Edwards & Lizzy Weiss	March 6, 2012	1.48
21	21	"The Sleep of Reason Produces Monsters"	Elodie Keene	Joy Gregory & Henry Robles	March 13, 2012	1.70
22	22	"Venus, Cupid, Folly, and Time"	Michael Lange	Lizzy Weiss	March 20, 2012	1.71
23	23	"This Is the Color of My Dreams"	Steve Miner	Lizzy Weiss	September 3, 2012	2.25
24	24	"The Intruder"	Patrick Norris	Chad Fiveash & James Stoteraux	September 10, 2012	1.67
25	25	"The Shock of Being Seen"	Steve Miner	Joy Gregory & Becky Hartman Edwards	September 17, 2012	1.58
26	26	"Tree of Forgiveness"	David Paymer	Ariel Rubin & Michael V. Ross	September 24, 2012	1.41
27	27	"The Declaration of Independence"	Steve Miner	Anne Kenney	October 1, 2012	1.44
28	28	"We Are the Kraken of Our Own Sinking Ships"	Ron Lagomarsino	Henry Robles	October 8, 2012	1.56
29	29	"The Trial"	Bethany Rooney	Joy Gregory & Becky Hartman Edwards	October 15, 2012	1.45
30	30	"Street Noises Invade the House"	Steve Miner	Lizzy Weiss	October 22, 2012	1.78

=== Season 2 (2013) ===
No. overall	No. in season	Title	Directed by	Written by	Original release date	US viewers (millions)
31	1	"The Door to Freedom"	Steve Miner	Lizzy Weiss	January 7, 2013	1.70
32	2	"The Awakening Conscience"	Fred Gerber	Joy Gregory & Bekah Brunstetter	January 14, 2013	1.65
33	3	"Duel of Two Women"	John Behring	Anne Kenney	January 21, 2013	1.74
34	4	"Dressing for the Charade"	Melanie Mayron	Chad Fiveash & James Stoteraux	January 28, 2013	1.76
35	5	"The Acquired Inability to Escape"	Zetna Fuentes	Joy Gregory & Henry Robles	February 4, 2013	1.79
36	6	"Human/Need/Desire"	Norman Buckley	Lizzy Weiss & Bekah Brunstetter	February 11, 2013	1.65
37	7	"Drive in the Knife"	Steve Miner	Chad Fiveash & James Stoteraux	February 18, 2013	1.52
38	8	"Tight Rope Walker"	Joanna Kerns	Anne Kenney & Henry Robles	February 25, 2013	1.69
39	9	"Uprising"	Steve Miner	Lizzy Weiss	March 4, 2013	1.63
40	10	"Introducing the Miracle"	Ron Lagomarsino	Becky Hartman Edwards & Lizzy Weiss	March 11, 2013	1.75
41	11	"Mother and Child Divided"	Ron Lagomarsino	Lizzy Weiss	June 10, 2013	1.66
42	12	"Distorted House"	Fred Gerber	Joy Gregory & Henry Robles	June 17, 2013	1.62
43	13	"The Good Samaritan"	Zetna Fuentes	Becky Hartman Edwards & Bekah Brunstetter	June 24, 2013	1.76
44	14	"He Did What He Wanted"	Steve Miner	Lizzy Weiss & Michael Ross	July 1, 2013	1.61
45	15	"Ecce Mono"	David Paymer	Chad Fiveash & James Stoteraux	July 8, 2013	2.02
46	16	"The Physical Impossibility of Death in the Mind of Someone Living"	Melanie Mayron	Darla Lansu	July 15, 2013	1.75
47	17	"Prudence, Avarice, Lust, Justice, Anger"	Lea Thompson	Terrence Coli & Becky Hartman Edwards	July 22, 2013	1.76
48	18	"As the Shadows Deepen"	Wendey Stanzler	Joy Gregory & Henry Robles	July 29, 2013	1.76
49	19	"What Goes Up Must Come Down"	Joanna Kerns	Bekah Brunstetter & Lizzy Weiss	August 5, 2013	1.68
50	20	"The Merrymakers"	Zetna Fuentes	James Stoteraux & Chad Fiveash	August 12, 2013	1.60
51	21	"Departure of Summer"	Steve Miner	Becky Hartman Edwards & Lizzy Weiss	August 19, 2013	1.96

=== Season 3 (2014) ===
No. overall	No. in season	Title	Directed by	Written by	Original release date	US viewers (millions)
52	1	"Drowning Girl"	Jim Hayman	Lizzy Weiss	January 13, 2014	1.76
53	2	"Your Body Is a Battleground"	Lea Thompson	James Stoteraux & Chad Fiveash	January 20, 2014	1.56
54	3	"Fountain"	Allan Arkush	Joy Gregory & Terrence Coli	January 27, 2014	1.55
55	4	"It Hurts to Wait With Love if Love Is Somewhere Else"	Melanie Mayron	Linda Gase & Henry Robles	February 3, 2014	1.62
56	5	"Have You Really the Courage?"	Zetna Fuentes	Bekah Brunstetter	February 10, 2014	1.70
57	6	"The Scream"	Jonathan Frakes	Chad Fiveash & James Stoteraux	February 17, 2014	1.70
58	7	"Memory Is Your Image of Perfection"	Lee Rose	Terrence Coli	February 24, 2014	1.63
59	8	"Dance Me to the End of Love"	Millicent Shelton	Michael V. Ross & Lizzy Weiss	March 3, 2014	1.61
60	9	"The Past (Forgotten-Swallowed)"	Fred Gerber	Joy Gregory	March 10, 2014	1.39
61	10	"The Ambush"	Allan Arkush	Henry Robles & Bekah Brunstetter	March 17, 2014	1.18
62	11	"Love Seduces Innocence, Pleasure Entraps, and Remorse Follows"	Steve Miner	Linda Gase & Lizzy Weiss	March 24, 2014	1.30
63	12	"Love Among the Ruins"	Norman Buckley	Lizzy Weiss	June 16, 2014	1.17
64	13	"Like a Snowball Down a Mountain"	Melanie Mayron	James Patrick Stoteraux & Chad Fiveash	June 23, 2014	1.41
65	14	"Oh, Future!"	Zetna Fuentes	Henry Robles	June 30, 2014	1.15
66	15	"And We Bring the Light"	James Hayman	Joy Gregory & Alexander Georgakis	July 7, 2014	1.33
67	16	"The Image Disappears"	Wendey Stanzler	Terrence Coli & Linda Gase	July 14, 2014	1.56
68	17	"Girl With Death Mask (She Plays Alone)"	Joanna Kerns	Bekah Brunstetter & Lizzy Weiss	July 21, 2014	1.36
69	18	"It Isn't What You Think"	Ron Lagomarsino	J.R. Phillips & Henry Robles	July 28, 2014	1.13
70	19	"You Will Not Escape"	Michael Lange	Joy Gregory	August 4, 2014	1.29
71	20	"Girl on the Cliff"	D. W. Moffett	Linda Gase	August 11, 2014	1.06
72	21	"And Life Begins Right Away"	Melanie Mayron	Lizzy Weiss & William H. Brown	August 18, 2014	1.29
73	22	"Yuletide Fortune Tellers"	Michael Grossman	Terrence Coli & Lizzy Weiss	December 8, 2014	1.40

=== Season 4 (2015) ===
No. overall	No. in season	Title	Directed by	Written by	Original release date	US viewers (millions)
74	1	"And It Cannot Be Changed"	Steve Miner	Lizzy Weiss	January 6, 2015	1.29
75	2	"Bracing the Waves"	Michael Lange	Henry Robles	January 13, 2015	1.15
76	3	"I Lock the Door Upon Myself"	Glenn L. Steelman	William H. Brown & Terrence Coli	January 20, 2015	1.21
77	4	"We Were So Close That Nothing Used to Stand Between Us"	Allan Arkush	Linda Gase & Bekah Brunstetter	January 27, 2015	1.30
78	5	"At the First Clear Word"	Melanie Mayron	Lizzy Weiss & Joy Gregory	February 3, 2015	1.24
79	6	"Black and Gray"	Ron Lagomarsino	Henry Robles & Darla Lansu	February 10, 2015	1.34
80	7	"Fog and Storm and Rain"	Lea Thompson	William H. Brown	February 17, 2015	1.25
81	8	"Art Like Love Is Dedication"	Jonathan Frakes	Linda Gase	February 24, 2015	0.95
82	9	"The Player's Choice"	David Paymer	Terrence Coli	March 3, 2015	0.96
83	10	"There Is My Heart"	Norman Buckley	Lizzy Weiss & Bekah Brunstetter	March 10, 2015	1.06
84	11	"To Repel Ghosts"	Millicent Shelton	Lizzy Weiss	August 24, 2015	0.98
85	12	"How Does a Girl Like You Get to Be a Girl Like You"	Zetna Fuentes	Bekah Brunstetter	August 31, 2015	0.87
86	13	"Between Hope and Fear"	David Paymer	Lizzy Weiss & Dayna Lynne North	September 7, 2015	0.99
87	14	"We Mourn, We Weep, We Love Again"	Ron Lagomarsino	Henry Robles & Alexander Georgakis	September 14, 2015	1.00
88	15	"Instead of Damning the Darkness, It's Better to Light a Little Lantern"	Michael Lange	Linda Gase & Lizzy Weiss	September 21, 2015	0.70
89	16	"Borrowing Your Enemy's Arrows"	D. W. Moffett	William H. Brown	September 28, 2015	0.76
90	17	"To the Victor Belong the Spoils"	Jay Karas	T.J. Brady and Rasheed Newson	October 5, 2015	0.79
91	18	"The Accommodations of Desire"	Michael Grossman	Henry Robles & Dayna Lynne North	October 12, 2015	0.75
92	19	"A Mad Tea Party"	Carlos Gonzalez	Linda Gase	October 19, 2015	0.95
93	20	"And Always Searching for Beauty"	Melanie Mayron	Lizzy Weiss & Bekah Brunstetter	October 26, 2015	0.83

=== Season 5 (2017) ===
No. overall	No. in season	Title	Directed by	Written by	Original release date	US viewers (millions)
94	1	"The Call"	Allan Arkush	Lizzy Weiss	January 31, 2017	0.60
95	2	"This Has to Do with Me"	D. W. Moffett	William H. Brown & Liz Sczudlo	February 7, 2017	0.54
96	3	"Surprise"	Stephen Tolkin	Terrence Coli & Colin Waite	February 14, 2017	0.52
97	4	"Relation of Lines and Colors"	Carlos González	Linda Gase & J.R. Phillips	February 21, 2017	0.52
98	5	"Occupy Truth"	Jeff Byrd	Talicia Raggs & Lizzy Weiss	February 28, 2017	0.51
99	6	"Four Ages in Life"	Janice Cooke	Terrence Coli & Lenn K. Rosenfeld	March 7, 2017	0.44
100	7	"Memory (The Heart)"	Lea Thompson	Linda Gase	March 21, 2017	0.50
101	8	"Left in Charge"	Dawn Wilkinson	Liz Sczudlo	March 28, 2017	0.47
102	9	"The Wolf Is Waiting"	Jill D'Agnenica	Terrence Coli & William H. Brown	April 4, 2017	0.43
103	10	"Long Live Love"	Steve Miner	Lizzy Weiss & Linda Gase	April 11, 2017	0.49

== Ratings ==
Switched at Birth : U.S. viewers per episode (millions)

Season	Episode number																														Average
Season	1	2	3	4	5	6	7	8	9	10	11	12	13	14	15	16	17	18	19	20	21	22	23	24	25	26	27	28	29	30	Average
1	3.30	2.92	2.77	2.80	1.68	2.63	2.69	3.14	2.79	2.84	2.74	2.07	1.99	1.90	1.93	1.82	1.46	1.79	1.51	1.48	1.70	1.71	2.25	1.67	1.58	1.41	1.44	1.56	1.45	1.78	2.08
2	1.70	1.65	1.74	1.76	1.79	1.65	1.52	1.69	1.63	1.75	1.66	1.62	1.76	1.61	2.02	1.75	1.76	1.76	1.68	1.60	1.96	–									1.72
3	1.76	1.56	1.55	1.62	1.70	1.70	1.63	1.61	1.39	1.18	1.30	1.17	1.41	1.15	1.33	1.56	1.36	1.13	1.29	1.06	1.29	1.40	–								1.42
4	1.29	1.15	1.21	1.30	1.24	1.34	1.25	0.95	0.96	1.06	0.98	0.87	0.99	1.00	0.70	0.76	0.79	0.75	0.95	0.83	–										1.01
5	0.60	0.54	0.52	0.52	0.51	0.44	0.50	0.47	0.43	0.49	–																				0.50

Audience measurement performed by Nielsen Media Research
