= One Last Thing (film) =

- Directed by: Tim Rouhana
- Written by: Tim Rouhana
- Produced by: Alexa L. Fogel; Brendan Mason
- Starring: Wendell Pierce; Jurnee Smollett; Joanne Froggatt
- Cinematography: Benji Bakshi
- Edited by: Perri B. Frank
- Music by: James Lavino
- Production companies: Beech Hill Films; Low Profile Films
- Distributed by: Screen Media
- Release date: 13 June 2018
- Running time: 92 minutes
- Country: United States
- Language: English

One Last Thing is a 2018 American drama film directed by Tim Rouhana, starring Wendell Pierce, Jurnee Smollett and Joanne Froggatt.

== Cast ==
- Wendell Pierce as Dylan
- Jurnee Smollett as Lucy
- Joanne Froggatt as Jaime
- April Billingsley as Lindsey
- Elizabeth Ludlow as Alex
- David Kronawitter as Dr. Akers
- Adora Dei as Dr. Ngawa
- Eric Mendenhall as Dr. Green
- Ed Amatrudo as Dr. Richards
- Kate Kovach as Mary
- Lisa Arrindell Anderson as Margo
- L. Warren Young as Xavier Cruz
- Tara Ochs as Rhonda

== Release ==
The film was released in theatres on 13 June 2018 and was made available on demand on 15 June.

== Reception ==
Jamie Broadnax of Black Girl Nerds wrote that while the film's pacing "tends to slow down at times", the storyline overall is "incredible" and the character development "evolves well". Broadnax also praised the performances of Pierce and Smollett, calling them "compelling".

Frank Scheck of The Hollywood Reporter praised the performances of Smollett and Pierce, but wrote that their "fine efforts" are "not enough to lift the mediocre One Last Thing above its basic cable-level veneer."
