= A Cherry Pie Christmas =

2025 American holiday romance film

- Directed by: John Stimpson
- Written by: John Stimpson; Caroline Portu; Staci Griesbach
- Produced by: Mark Donadio; Staci Griesbach; Katie Leclerc; Miriam Marcus
- Starring: Katie Leclerc; Ryan Carnes
- Cinematography: Carlo Besasie
- Edited by: John Stimpson
- Music by: Ed Grenga
- Release date: October 9, 2025
- Running time: 85 minutes
- Country: United States
- Language: English

A Cherry Pie Christmas (also released as A Wisconsin Christmas Pie) is a 2025 American holiday romance film set and filmed in Door County, Wisconsin. The film stars Katie Leclerc and Ryan Carnes and centers on a pastry chef who returns to her hometown during the Christmas season, where she reconnects with her past and helps preserve her family's cherry orchard.

== Plot ==
The film follows Emma Parker, a successful pastry chef who returns to Door County for the holidays. While home, she becomes involved in saving her family's cherry orchard and reconnects with her former high school sweetheart, forcing her to reconsider her career ambitions and personal priorities.

== Cast ==
- Katie Leclerc as Emma Parker
- Ryan Carnes as Mitch Henrickson
- Ed Amatrudo as Brian Parker
- Debrah Farentino as Sally Parker
- Seamus Flynn as Max Henrickson
- Parth Akoliya as Calvin Russo
- Peter Carey as Everett Henrickson
- Jennifer Joan Taylor as Clara Henrickson
- Anna Zhang as Jennifer
- Jen Bosworth-Ramirez as Teresa
- Donovan Wade as Devon

== Production ==
A Cherry Pie Christmas was filmed on location throughout Door County, Wisconsin, including several towns and local businesses. The production highlighted the region's winter scenery, cherry orchards, and small-town atmosphere. Local tourism organizations and businesses participated in the filming, with the movie later being promoted as a showcase for Door County as a holiday destination.

== Release ==
The film was released in 2025 under the title A Cherry Pie Christmas, with some broadcasts and listings using the alternate title A Wisconsin Christmas Pie.

== Reception and impact ==
Local media coverage highlighted the film's role in promoting Door County tourism during the winter season, with filming locations incorporated into holiday travel marketing efforts.

Kendra Meinert of Green Bay Press-Gazette called A Cherry Pie Christmas "so sweet that it’s hard not to go back for seconds – or thirds". Neal Justin of The Minnesota Star Tribune said the film has "plenty of references that will delight" visitors to Door County. The Capital writer Lori Rackl called the film a "typical feel-good, hygge-filled holiday flick" and "a love letter to a vacation destination that often gets overlooked when the temperature drops".
