= Meeghan Holaway =

American actress

- Born: Seattle, Washington
- Other name: Beth Holaway
- Education: Pomona College (B.A.)
- Occupation: Actress
- Website: www.meeghan.com

Meeghan Holaway is an American actress/singer working in theatre, film and television. She originated the role of Florence Greenberg in the Broadway musical Baby It's You!. Her first television appearance was on Everybody Loves Raymond. She is best known for guest and recurring roles on a number of notable TV series.

== Early life ==
Holaway was born in Seattle. She has a B.A. from Pomona College in Claremont, California, where she graduated with honors and became a Rhodes Scholarship finalist and a member of Phi Beta Kappa.

== Career ==
After graduation, Holaway worked in New England and New York doing regional theatre, including the Oldcastle Theatre Company in Bennington, Vermont, in plays like Baby Its You and Les Miserables. She also sang with a 1950s cover band and various cabaret groups. She played Beth in the first run of the Pulitzer Prize winning play, Dinner With Friends Off-Broadway.

She moved to Los Angeles and began working in TV and film. She has starred in movies like Inspector Mom, Beverly H, and Holidate. She has played guest and recurring roles on a number of series, including NCIS , Cold Case, Criminal Minds , Law & Order, Two and a Half Men , Without a Trace , Switched at Birth, Bones, Desperate Housewives, Heroes, and Grey's Anatomy.
