= Switched at Birth (TV series) =

2011 American teen and family drama television series

- Genre: Family drama
- Created by: Lizzy Weiss
- Starring: Sean Berdy; Lucas Grabeel; Katie Leclerc; Vanessa Marano; Constance Marie; D. W. Moffett; Lea Thompson; Gilles Marini
- Theme music composer: John Swihart
- Composer: John Swihart
- Country of origin: United States
- Original languages: English; American Sign Language
- No. of seasons: 5
- No. of episodes: 103 (list of episodes)

Production
- Executive producers: Lizzy Weiss; Paul Stupin; John Ziffren; Becky Hartman Edwards; Linda Gase
- Producers: David Hartle; Shawn Wilt; Sean Reycraft
- Cinematography: Frank Byers; Russ T. Alsobrook; Daryn Okada; Carlos González; Phil Parmet
- Editors: Peter Basinski; Jill D'Agnenica; Debby Germino; Susan Kobata; Mitchell Danton; William Marrinson; Nathan Easterling; David Abramson
- Camera setup: Multi-camera
- Running time: 45 minutes; 63 minutes ("Long Live Love")
- Production companies: Pirates' Cove Entertainment; Suzy B. Productions (from "This Is The Color Of My Dreams")

Original release
- Network: Freeform
- Release: June 6, 2011 – April 11, 2017

Switched at Birth is an American teen and family drama television series that premiered on ABC Family on June 6, 2011. The one-hour scripted drama is set in the Kansas City metropolitan area, and revolves around two teenagers who were switched at birth and grew up in very different environments: one in an affluent suburb, and the other in a working-class neighborhood. According to ABC Family, it is "the first mainstream television series to have multiple deaf and hard-of-hearing series regulars and scenes shot entirely in American Sign Language (ASL)".

The show's debut was ABC Family's highest-rated series debut to date. The series won an honorary Peabody Award in 2013, and on July 30, ABC Family ordered a third season which premiered on January 13, 2014. On August 13, 2014, ABC Family renewed the series for a fourth season, which premiered on January 6, 2015.

On October 21, 2015, ABC Family (later rebranded as Freeform) confirmed the series had been renewed for its fifth season, which was later confirmed to be the final season. On March 19, 2016, it was announced that the fifth season was bumped from a March 2016 to a January 2017 premiere date. In October 2016, the network announced that the final season would premiere on January 31, 2017.

== Plot ==
Bay Kennish, a teenage girl living in the Kansas City suburb of Mission Hills, Kansas, discovers from a school lab assignment that her blood type is incompatible with that of her parents. Genetic testing confirms that Bay is not the Kennishes' biological daughter. It is revealed that the hospital mistakenly switched Bay at birth with Daphne Vasquez, who has been raised by her single mother Regina and grandmother Adriana in the low-income neighborhood of East Riverside, Missouri. Daphne is deaf, having lost her hearing as a result of contracting meningitis at age three. The Kennishes invite Daphne and Regina to their home, and after learning that Regina is struggling financially, propose that they move into their guest house with Adriana, an offer that Regina accepts.

This arrangement forces the girls, along with both families, to understand their differences and embrace their similarities. The girls sometimes struggle with their identities. Bay discovers that she has inherited her artistic talent from Regina, and Daphne discovers she has inherited John's athletic skills and Kathryn's love of cooking. Both mothers learn to bond with their biological daughters, while often unintentionally angering the ones they raised. John learns to relate to his new-found daughter by coaching her deaf school's basketball team and employing her in the office of one of the local chain of car washes that he owns. Bay is driven by a need to find her biological father, Angelo Sorrento, who left Regina shortly after Daphne went deaf.

== Episodes ==
Season	Episodes	Originally released	
Season	Episodes	First released	Last released
1	30	June 6, 2011	October 22, 2012
2	21	January 7, 2013	August 19, 2013
3	22	January 13, 2014	December 8, 2014
4	20	January 6, 2015	October 26, 2015
5	10	January 31, 2017	April 11, 2017

== Cast ==
=== Main characters ===
Constance Marie, Katie Leclerc, Vanessa Marano, Lea Thompson, D.W. Moffett, and Lucas Grabeel

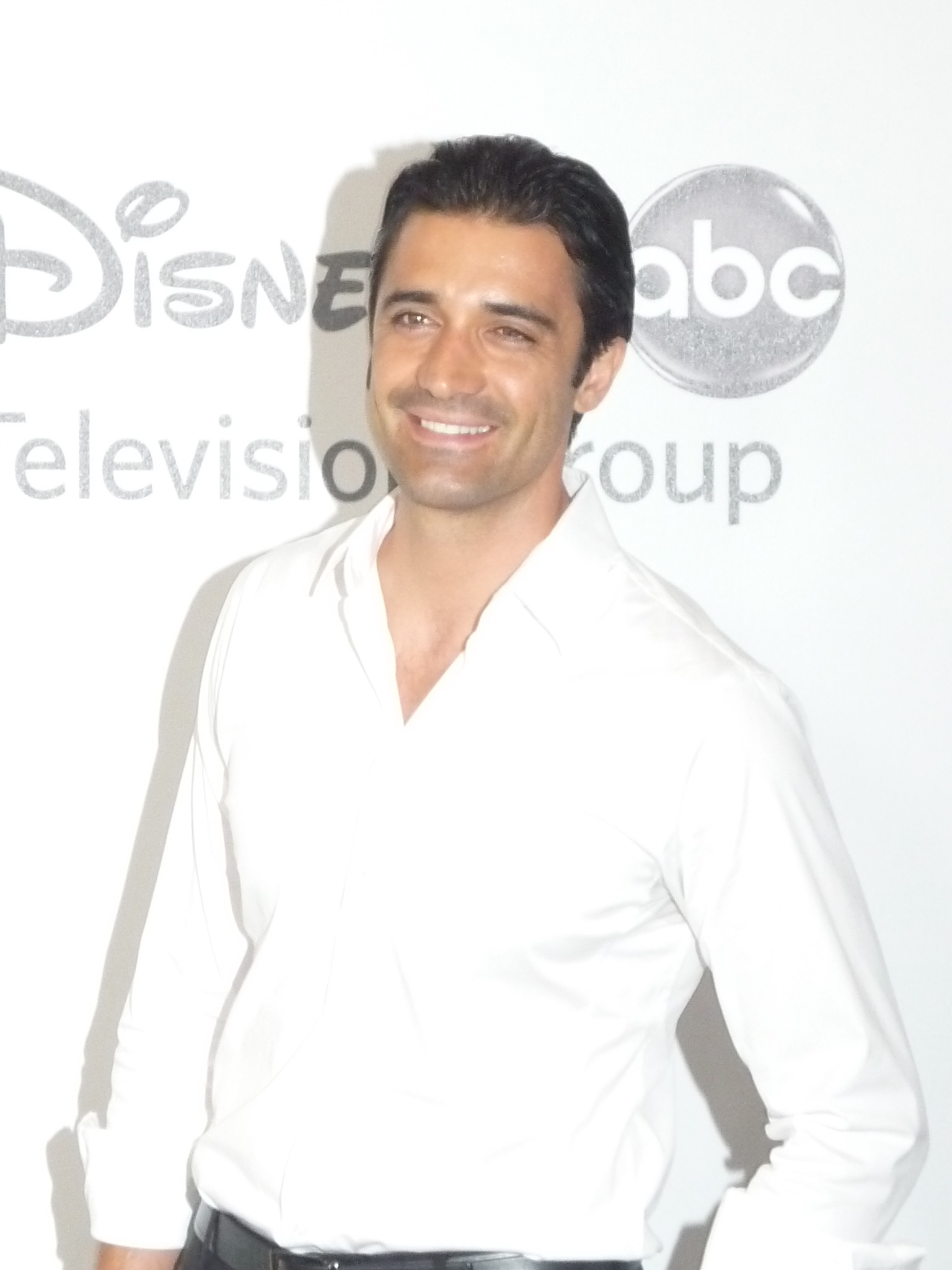
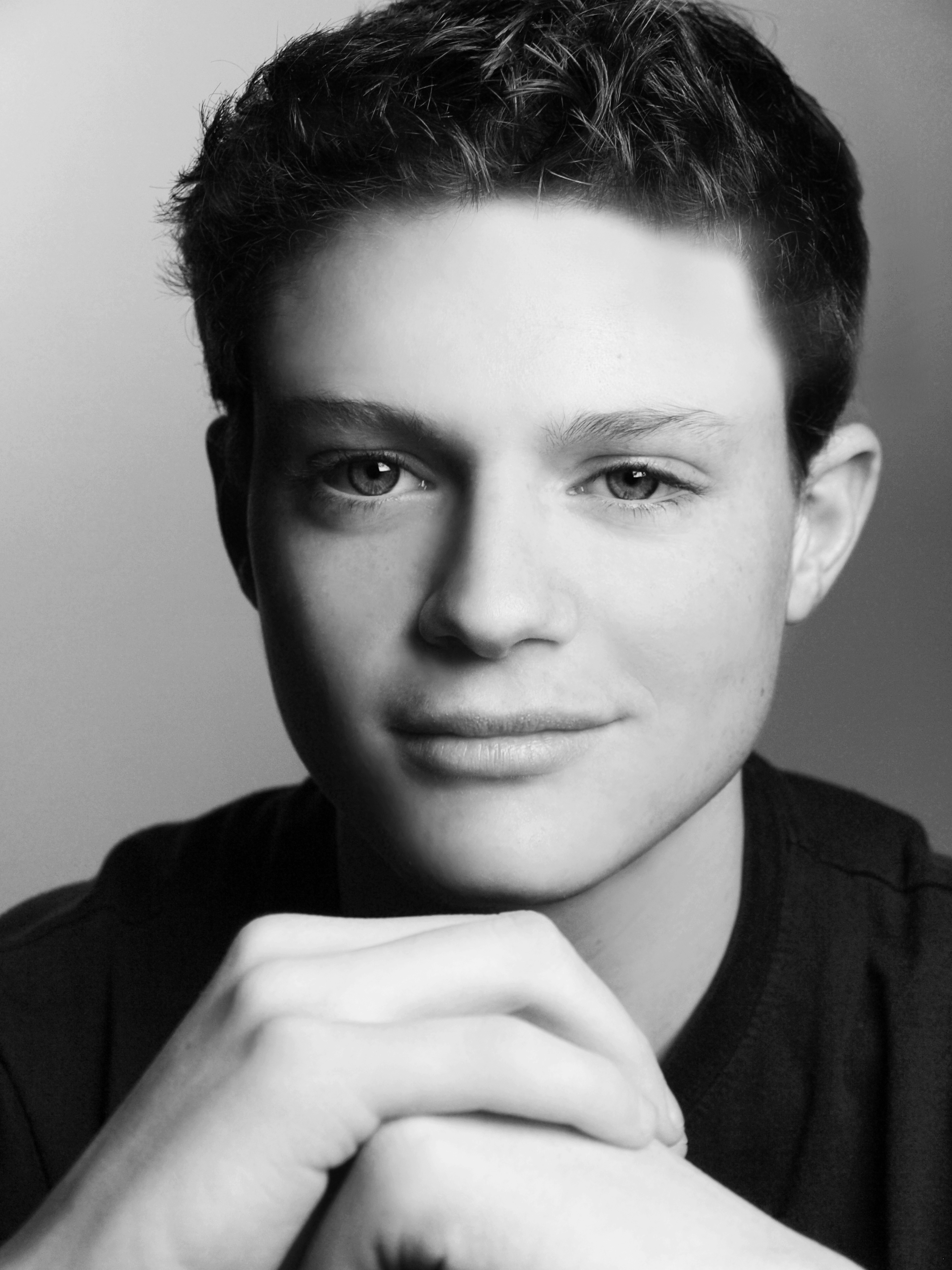
Gilles Marini and Sean Berdy
- Sean Berdy as Emmett Bledsoe (regular seasons 1–4, recurring season 5), Daphne's best friend who is also deaf. He later dates Bay.
- Lucas Grabeel as Toby Kennish: Bay and Daphne's older brother.
- Katie Leclerc as Daphne Paloma Vasquez: the biological daughter of John and Kathryn Kennish. Hard of hearing rather than deaf, Leclerc learned ASL at age 17, before she was diagnosed at age 20 with Ménière's disease which runs in her family. She developed a deaf accent for her role as Daphne, but speaks without it briefly in a scene in season 1, episode 9 where Daphne dreams the switch never occurred, and she was raised as Bay Kennish and retains her hearing. She also speaks without the accent through the majority of two other episodes: "Ecce Mono" (season 2, episode 15), which shows an alternative reality in which Daphne was raised by the Kennishes from age three and got a cochlear implant; and "Yuletide Fortune Tellers" (season 3, episode 22), which shows an alternate reality where the switch never happened.
- Vanessa Marano as Bay Madeline Kennish: the biological daughter of Regina Vasquez and Angelo Sorrento. She was raised in the wealthy neighborhood of Mission Hills by John and Kathryn Kennish. Bay is a very talented artist who has a particular love for Frida Kahlo. Bay can be very impulsive at times, and, at first, does not take the news of the switch well. However, she gradually gets better in accepting that Regina and the Kennishes are both her family.
- Constance Marie as Regina Vasquez: Bay's biological mother and Daphne's legal mother.
- D. W. Moffett as John Kennish: Bay's legal father and Daphne's biological father.
- Lea Thompson as Kathryn Kennish: Bay's legal mother and Daphne's biological mother.
- Gilles Marini as Angelo Sorrento (recurring season 1, regular seasons 2–3): Bay's biological father and Daphne's legal father.

=== Recurring characters ===
- Marlee Matlin as Melody Bledsoe, Emmett's mother and Regina's friend who is also deaf.
- Ivonne Coll as Adriana Vasquez, Regina's mother. It is a running gag on the show that Adriana likes to watch telenovelas, and she quips that they cannot compete with the real-life drama caused by Angelo.
- Austin Butler as Wilke, Toby's best friend who also dates Daphne briefly.
- Maiara Walsh as Simone Sinclair, Bay's nemesis and Toby's ex-girlfriend, as well as Wilkie's ex-girlfriend
- Blair Redford as Ty Mendoza, Bay's ex-boyfriend and Regina and Daphne's friend from their old neighborhood
- Charles Michael Davis as Liam Lupo, Bay and Daphne's ex-boyfriend
- B. K. Cannon as Mary Beth, Bay's and Ty's friend and Travis' ex-girlfriend
- Anthony Natale as Cameron Bledsoe, Emmett's father
- TL Forsberg as Olivia, Cameron Bledsoe's stoner ex-girlfriend
- Christopher Wiehl as Patrick, Regina's ex-boyfriend
- Tania Raymonde as Zarra, Bay's rebellious friend
- Justin Bruening as Chef Jeff Reycraft, Daphne's boss and short-term boyfriend
- Ryan Lane as Travis Barnes, Daphne's deaf friend. Lane's role as Travis earned him the RJ Mitte Diversity Award at the 2013 Media Access Awards. He is Bay's boyfriend in the final season.
- Max Lloyd-Jones as Noah, Bay's hard-of-hearing friend (and short-term boyfriend). The character parallels the real-life situation of Katie Leclerc, with hearing loss due to inherited Ménière's disease.
- Annie Ilonzeh as Lana, the mother of Angelo's second child
- Cassi Thomson as Nikki Papagus (Kennish), Toby's ex-wife
- Stephanie Nogueras as Natalie Pierce, a deaf lesbian Carlton student who becomes Bay's friend
- Max Adler as Miles "Tank" Conroy, Bay's ex-boyfriend and Toby's former roommate
- Alec Mapa as Renzo, Kathryn's friend who she meets while taking tap-dancing classes
- RJ Mitte as Campbell Bingman, a pre-med student, wheelchair user and volunteer at the free clinic where Daphne is serving her hours of community service. He briefly dates Daphne.
- David Castaneda as Jorge, Daphne's ex-boyfriend
- Bianca Bethune as Sharee, Daphne's friend and field hockey teammate from Carlton
- Sharon Pierre-Louis as Iris, Daphne's hearing and signing college roommate and cousin of her pre-med interpreter
- Adam Hagenbuch as Greg "Mingo" Shimingo, Daphne's college boyfriend and son of John's former business manager
- Nyle DiMarco as Garrett Banducci, a Carlton student and co-worker of Travis' who takes a romantic interest in Bay. He is also deaf.
- Daniel Durant as Matthew, a deaf boy who tries to frame hearing students at school. He is also revealed as gay and has a romantic interest in Emmett.
- Rachel Shenton as Lily Summers, a neighbour who becomes pregnant with Toby's baby.
- Alice Lee as Skye, Emmett's film making friend at UCLA
- Kenneth Mitchell as Wes, Regina's boss.

=== Guest stars ===
- Meredith Baxter appears in season 1 and 4 as Kathryn's mother Bonnie, a co-investor in John's car wash business, whose favor shifts from Bay to Daphne upon learning of the switch.
- Corbin Bernsen appears in season 1 as Wilkie's father, James Wilkes Jr., who has the unpleasant task of telling Daphne he is sending his troubled son to boarding school.
- Shelley Long appears in season 1 as Rya Bellows, a publisher who encourages Kathryn to write her own memoir of the switch.
- Terrell Tilford as Eric, opened the coffee shop and Regina is now a partner of. The two of them are also in a relationship. Eric has a young son and mysterious past.
- Sandra Bernhard as Teresa Ledarsky, Bay's art teacher in Season 3.
- Davi Santos appears in Season 3, Episode 12: Love Among the Ruins as Martin, Nacho's friend.
- Sam Adegoke appears in Season 5, as Chris Walker.
- Shayne Topp appears in Season 4, Episode 3 as Taylor Halstead.

== Production ==
On August 1, 2011, ABC Family announced that they were ordering more episodes for the first season of Switched at Birth, bringing the first season to a total of 30 episodes. After the airing of the series' initial 10 episodes ended on August 8, 2011, the series continued with a winter premiere on January 3, 2012, airing an additional 12 episodes through March 20, 2012. The series began airing the remaining 8 episodes of its first season on September 3, 2012. On August 17, 2012, ABC Family renewed Switched at Birth for a second season; it premiered on January 7, 2013. After the spring finale on March 11, 2013, the second season resumed on June 10, 2013. On July 30, 2013, ABC Family renewed the show for a third season to premiere on January 13, 2014.

The show has an American Sign Language expert who helps make sure that the sign language used by the four fluent regulars (Katie Leclerc, Sean Berdy, Constance Marie, and Marlee Matlin) all employ a similar dialect.

Airing on March 4, 2013, to mark the 25th anniversary of the "Deaf President Now" protests at Gallaudet University, the season 2 episode "Uprising"—which featured a similar student-led protest surrounding the closure of Carlton School for the Deaf, was produced almost entirely in sign language.

=== Filming locations ===
The show was filmed in Los Angeles, California. Establishing shots used in several episodes feature video of downtown Kansas City, Missouri, including: a shot of the Liberty Memorial in the first episode; the Kemper Museum of Contemporary Art; and Loose Park. Scenes were filmed in Santa Clarita, Valencia, Beverly Hills, and Pasadena.

=== Marketing ===
ABC Family promoted the series by launching an online game, Switched at Birth: Hunt for the Code one week before the premiere. Bay, a graffiti artist, left her signature stencil image on ten different websites, and players searched for the picture and accompanying code to redeem sneak peeks and enter a drawing to win $4,000. Each weekday, ABCFamily.com posted two clues hinting at a site featuring the image, and instructed users to scan the code with a Microsoft Tag Reader for exclusive content. Additionally, each code had two letters for fans to collect and enter to win upon completion of the ten-digit code.

== Broadcast ==
Country/region	Channel	Premiere	Title	Ref.
United States	Freeform	June 6, 2011	Switched at Birth	
Latin America	Sony Spin	November 7, 2011	Cambiadas al nacer	
Canada	YTV; W Network	January 16, 2012	Switched at Birth	
Italy	DeeJay TV	February 8, 2012	Switched at Birth – Al posto tuo	
Russia	Disney Channel	December 3, 2012	Их перепутали в роддоме	
France	6ter	January 3, 2014	Switched	
Germany; Austria; Liechtenstein; Switzerland	Disney Channel	January 20, 2014	Switched at Birth	
Israel	Yes Drama	June 6, 2011	הוחלפו בלידתן (Switched at Birth)	
Greece	Open TV	October 28, 2024	Μπέρδεμα από Κούνια (Cot Mess)	

== Reception ==
=== Critical reception ===
On the review aggregator website Rotten Tomatoes, the first season holds an approval rating of 100% based on 6 reviews, with an average rating of 7.50/10, while the second season holds an approval rating of 100% based on 5 reviews, with an average rating of 8.50/10. The site's critics consensus reads, "Despite leaning on a tried-and-true premise, Switched at Birth proves to be an entertaining remix thanks to fresh writing and charming characters." On Metacritic, the first season of the show holds a score of 75 out of 100 based on reviews from 5 critics, indicating "generally favorable reviews".

=== Ratings ===
The show's premiere on the ABC Family network was the highest-rated ever, with 3.3 million viewers. The total, including the first episode's repeat later that evening, was an estimated 4.9 million.

Season	Timeslot (ET)	No. of eps.	Premiere			Finale			U.S. television season	Viewers (in millions)
Season	Timeslot (ET)	No. of eps.	Date	Viewers (in millions)	18–49 rating	Date	Viewers (in millions)	18–49 rating	U.S. television season	Viewers (in millions)
1	Monday 9:00 pm (June 6 – August 8, 2011); Tuesday 8:00 pm (January 3 – March 20, 2012); Monday 8:00 pm (September 3 – October 22, 2012)	30	June 6, 2011	3.30	1.3	October 22, 2012	1.78	0.8	2011–12	2.08
2	Monday 8:00 pm	21	January 7, 2013	1.70	0.7	August 19, 2013	1.96	0.8	2012–13	1.72
3	Monday 8:00 pm	22	January 13, 2014	1.76	0.7	December 8, 2014	1.40	0.6	2013–14	1.42
4	Tuesday 9:00 pm (January 6 – March 10, 2015); Monday 8:00 pm (August 24 – October 26, 2015)	20	January 6, 2015	1.29	0.6	October 26, 2015	0.83	0.3	2014–15	
5	Tuesday 9:00 pm (January 31 – April 11, 2017)	10	January 31, 2017	0.60	0.2	April 11, 2017	0.49	0.2	2016–17	

=== Accolades ===
Year	Award	Category	Nominee(s)	Result	Ref.
2011	ALMA Awards	Favorite TV Actress — Supporting Role	Constance Marie	Nominated	
2011	American Scene Awards	Crystal Award	Switched at Birth	Won	
2011	Teen Choice Awards	Choice Breakout Star	Sean Berdy	Nominated	
2011	Teen Choice Awards	Choice Breakout Star	Katie Leclerc	Nominated	
2011	Teen Choice Awards	Choice Summer TV Show	Switched at Birth	Nominated	
2011	Teen Choice Awards	Choice Summer TV Star – Female	Vanessa Marano	Nominated	
2011	Teen Choice Awards	Choice Summer TV Star – Male	Lucas Grabeel	Nominated	
2012	ALMA Awards	Favorite TV Actress – Supporting Role	Constance Marie	Won	
2012	Gracie Awards	Outstanding Female Actor in a Supporting Role in a Drama Series or Special	Constance Marie	Won	
2012	Gracie Awards	Outstanding Producer – Entertainment	Lizzy Weiss	Won	
2012	Imagen Awards	Best Primetime Program	Switched at Birth	Won	
2012	Imagen Awards	Best Supporting Actress – Television	Constance Marie	Nominated	
2012	Peabody Awards	—	Switched at Birth	Won	
2012	TCA Awards	Outstanding Achievement in Youth Programming	Switched at Birth	Won	
2013	Imagen Awards	Best Primetime TV Program	Switched at Birth	Nominated	
2013	Imagen Awards	Best Supporting Actress – Television	Constance Marie	Won	
2013	Media Access Awards	Casting Society of America Award	Deedee Bradley	Won	
2013	Media Access Awards	RJ Mitte Diversity Award	Ryan Lane	Won	
2013	TCA Awards	Outstanding Achievement in Youth Programming	Switched at Birth	Nominated	
2013	Teen Choice Awards	Choice TV Actor – Drama	Lucas Grabeel	Nominated	
2013	Teen Choice Awards	Choice TV Actress – Drama	Vanessa Marano	Nominated	
2013	Teen Choice Awards	Choice TV Show – Drama	Switched at Birth	Nominated	
2013	TwoCents TV Awards	Drama Queens	Katie Leclerc	Won	
2014	Imagen Awards	Best Primetime TV Program – Drama or Comedy	Switched at Birth	Nominated	
2014	Imagen Awards	Best Supporting Actress – Television	Constance Marie	Nominated	
2014	Teen Choice Awards	Choice TV Actor – Drama	Lucas Grabeel	Nominated	
2014	Teen Choice Awards	Choice TV Show – Drama	Switched at Birth	Nominated	
2014	TCA Awards	Outstanding Achievement in Youth Programming	Switched at Birth	Nominated	

== See also ==
- Switched at Birth, 1991 film
- Switched at Birth, 1999 film
- Paramparça, 2014–2017 TV series
