= Katie Leclerc =

American actress

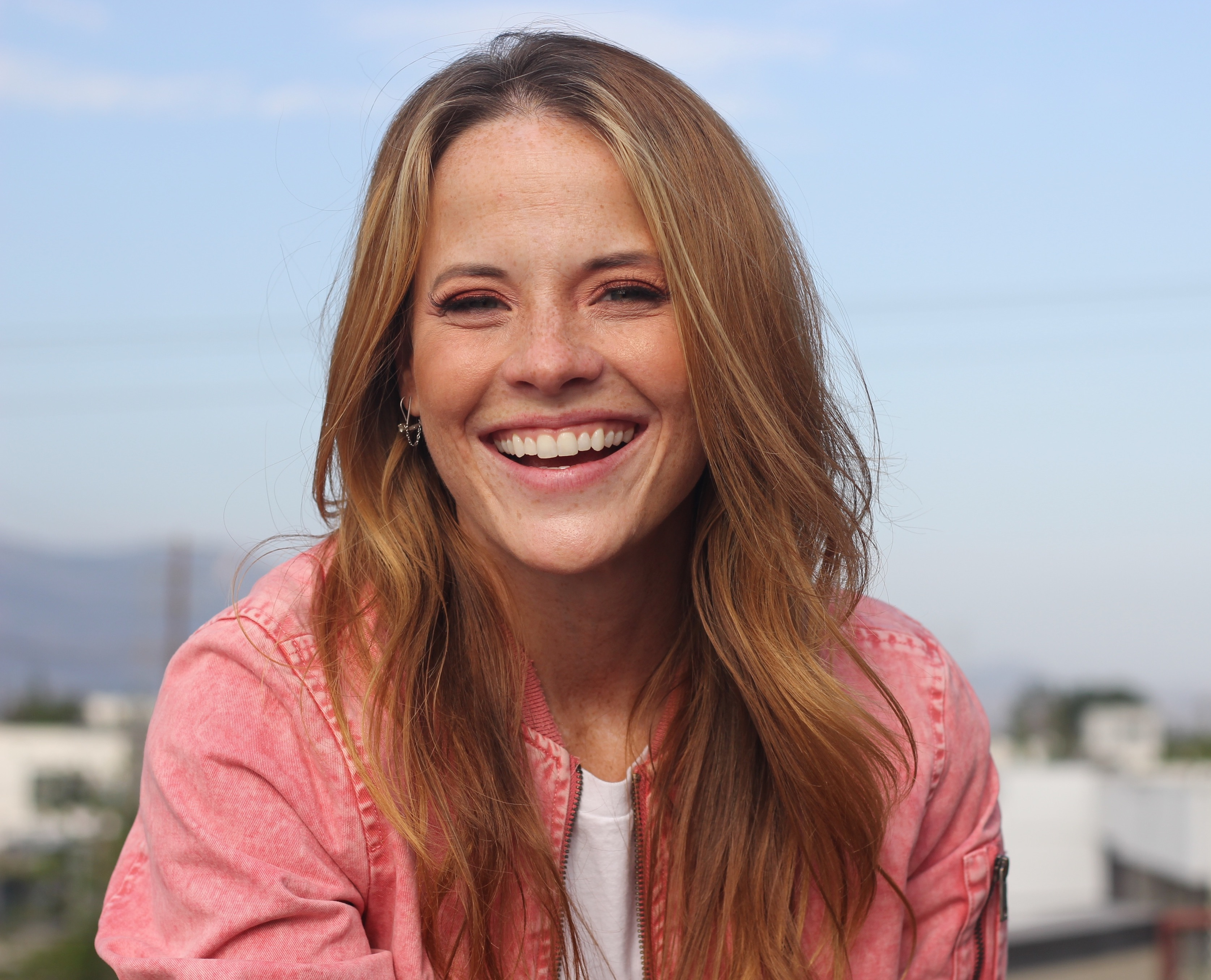
- Leclerc in 2021
- Occupations: Actress, producer
- Years active: 2005–present
- Known for: Switched at Birth
- Spouse: Brian Habecost (m. 2014; div. 2017)

Katie Leclerc is an American actress and producer. She has appeared on several television series, including Veronica Mars, Fashion House, Community and The Big Bang Theory. In 2011, she was cast in the television show Switched at Birth, starring as Daphne Vasquez.

== Personal life ==
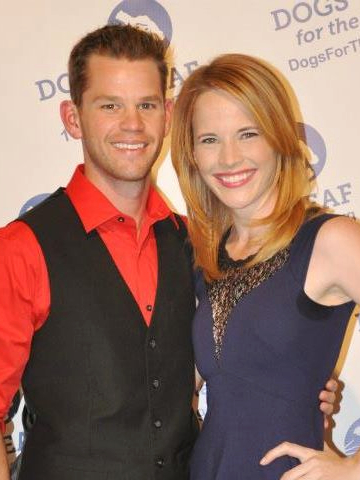
Leclerc with Ryan Lane at a Dogs for the Deaf benefit in April 2013

Leclerc grew up in Lakewood, Colorado. She is the youngest of three siblings. She started learning American Sign Language at 17, before she found out she had Ménière's disease, which leads to hearing loss. Her older sister also teaches ASL. Both her father and older sister have Ménière's disease as well.

Leclerc married longtime boyfriend Brian Habecost, a real estate salesman, on September 6, 2014. In July 2017, Leclerc filed for divorce.

== Career ==
Leclerc discovered her passion for acting in seventh grade when she got the lead role in a production of Annie. She then moved to San Diego, to pursue theatre at Valley Center High School. She took part in commercials for Pepsi, Cingular, Comcast, and GE.

"My agent submitted me for a nationwide casting call for the roles of Emma and Daphne. I ended up getting a callback, and that's when I was asked to try a "deaf accent." It's something we discussed in depth. We wanted to make sure my portrayal was respectful and done correctly. At the same time, we felt that using a Deaf accent would be a really strong choice for the character.

== Filmography ==
=== Film ===
	Title	Role	Notes
2009	Flying By	Ally	
2009	The Inner Circle	Claire	
2015	The Reckoning	Katherine	
2016	Holiday Breakup	Kelly	
2016	Stars Are Already Dead	Ireland	
2017	Party Boat	Kiley	Direct-to-video
2019	Round of Your Life	Minka	
2021	A Cape Cod Christmas	Margot	
2021	Blue Call	kaylee	
2025	A Cherry Pie Christmas	Emma Parker	

=== Television ===
Year	Title	Role	Notes
2005	Veronica Mars	Crystal	Episode: "Silence of the Lamb"
2006	Fashion House	Sara	4 episodes
2007	The Naked Trucker and T-Bones Show	Tokersville Queen	Episode: "Salute to America"
2007	Saints & Sinners	Bride	Episode: "Dance, Dance Revolution"
2008	The Riches	Teen Girl	Episode: "Friday Night Lights"
2008	The Ex List	Mila	Episode: "Protect and Serve"
2010	The Hard Times of RJ Berger	Deaf Girl	Episode: "Lily Pad"
2011, 2017	The Big Bang Theory	Emily	2 episodes
2011–2017	Switched at Birth	Daphne Vasquez	Main role
2012	CSI: Crime Scene Investigation	Christine	Episode: "Play Dead"
2013	My Synthesized Life	Amanda	2 episodes
2013	The Confession	Katie Lapp/Katherine Mayfield	Television film
2014	Community	Carol	Episode: "Analysis of Cork-Based Networking"
2015	Cloudy With a Chance of Love	Debbie Metcalfe	Television film
2015	The Reckoning	Katie Lapp/Katherine Mayfield	Television film
2017	Confess	Auburn Reed	Web series
2017	Psycho In-Law	Tina	Television film
2019	A Bride's Revenge	Miya	Television film
2019	Christmas a la Mode	Emily	Television film
2020	NCIS	SSgt. Diana Murphy	Episode: “Sound Off”
2023	Letters to Santa	Rebecca	Hallmark Movie
2024	A Very Vermont Christmas	Joy Keogh	Hallmark Movie
2025	Pulse	Kathryn Vogel	2 episodes
2025	A Wisconsin Christmas Pie	Emma Parker	Great American Family Network

== Awards and nominations ==
Year	Award	Work	Result	Ref.
2011	Teen Choice Awards for Choice Breakout Star	Switched at Birth	Nominated	
2013	TwoCents TV Award for Drama Queens	Switched at Birth	Won	
2014	Indie Series Award for Best Guest Star - Comedy	My Synthesized Life	Nominated	
