= Lizzy Weiss =

American screenwriter

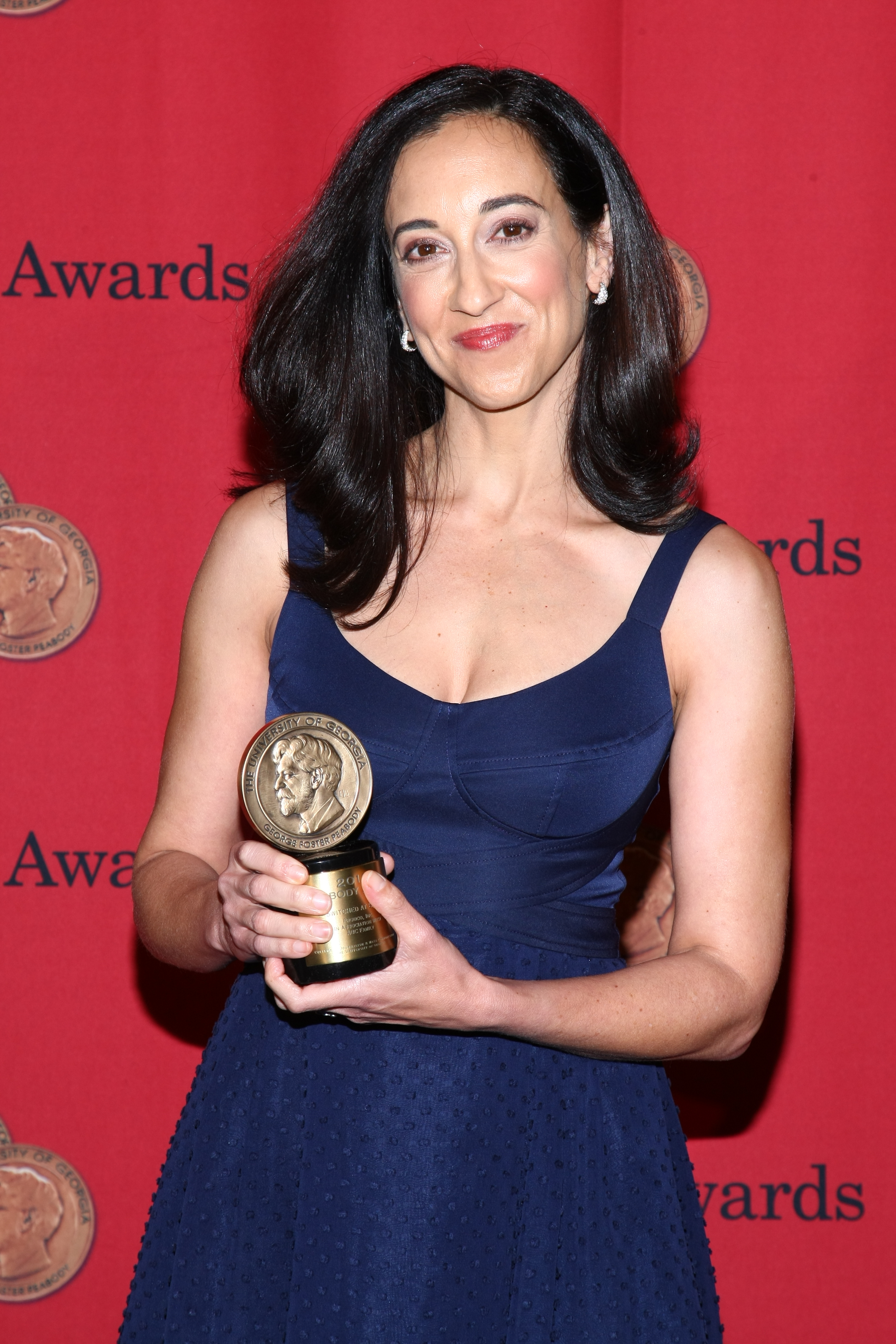
- Weiss at the 72nd Annual Peabody Awards
- Born: Los Angeles, California, U.S.
- Occupations: Screenwriter, television producer, television writer
- Years active: 2000–present

Lizzy Weiss is an American screenwriter, television producer, and television writer.

She was born and raised in Los Angeles. She graduated from Duke University in 1992 with a Bachelor of Arts in Sociology and Women’s Studies. Weiss continued her education at New York University and received a Master of Arts in Communication in 1993.

After finishing her education, she had a number of writing jobs until in 1999 Weiss wrote for the MTV original film Holding Patterns. This was the first time that she was paid for her writing. Although the film did not air, she was hired again by MTV to write for the TV series Undressed.

While writing for MTV she was given an article called Surf Girls of Maui from Outside magazine. She wrote a script for a film that was similar to the article. After John Stockwell was hired to direct the film Blue Crush, Weiss was chosen to write for the film. In an interview with Jan Lisa Huttner, Weiss expresses her love for how the script "wrestles with the problem of how to be 'a girl' & how to be 'an athlete' at the same time -- how to be in love." This conflict of "how to be in love and be taken care of, but also be in charge" features prominently in the film.

Weiss' other television credits include Cashmere Mafia and the ABC Family series Switched at Birth, in which she is creator and executive producer.

In 2012, Weiss won the 2012 Gracie Allen Award for Outstanding Producer for Switched at Birth. Switched at Birth was also honored with 2013 Peabody Award.
