= Jeff Hiller =

American actor (born 1975)

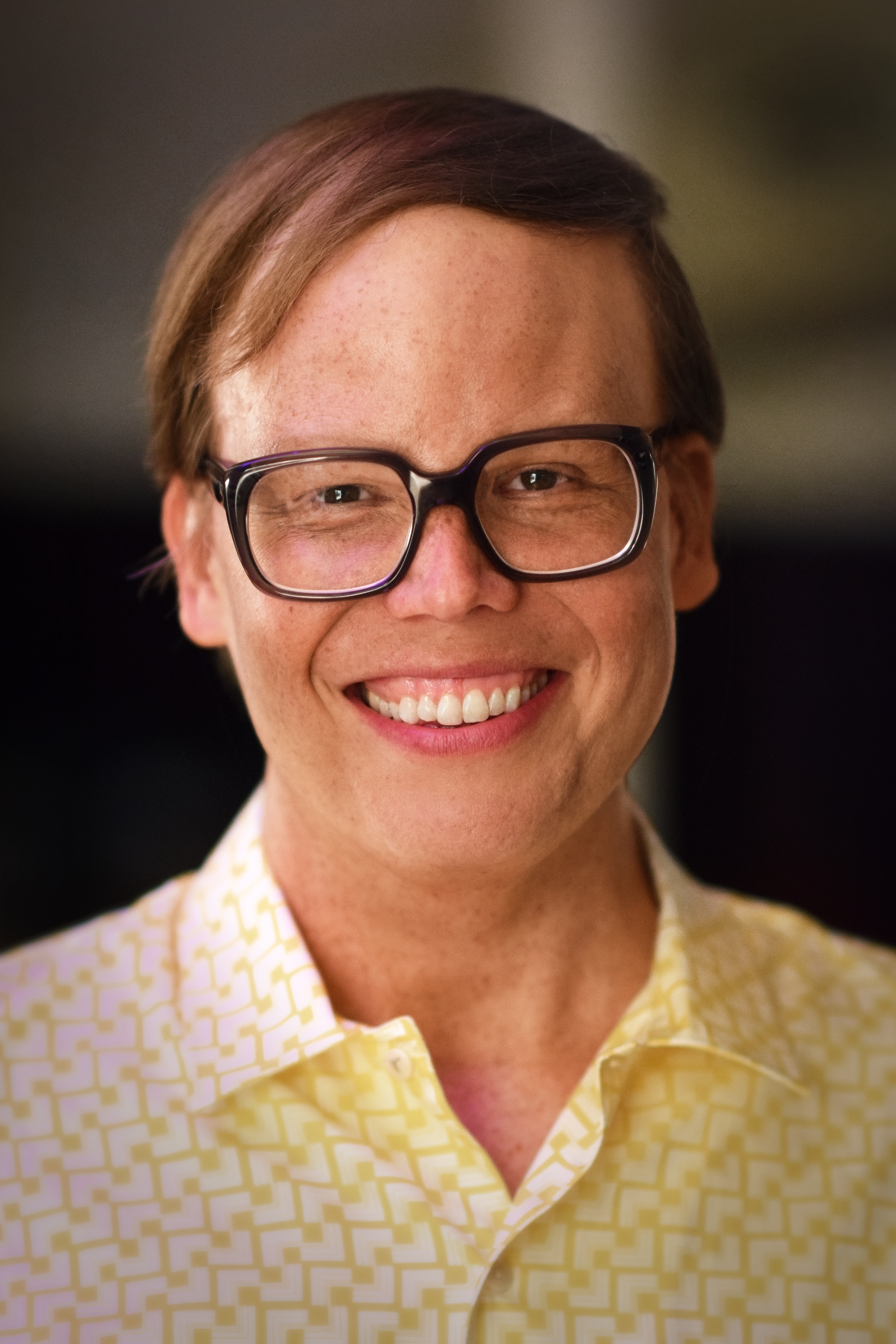
- Hiller in 2023
- Born: December 7, 1975 (age 50); San Antonio, Texas, U.S.
- Education: Texas Lutheran University (BA)
- Occupation: Actor
- Years active: 2001–present
- Notable work: Somebody Somewhere
- Spouse: Neil Goldberg (m. 2013)
- Website: hillertime.com

Jeff Hiller (born December 7, 1975) is an American actor, improvisor and comedian. He is best known for his portrayal of Joel on the television series Somebody Somewhere, for which he won the 2025 Primetime Emmy Award for Outstanding Supporting Actor in a Comedy Series.

== Early life and education ==
Hiller grew up in San Antonio, Texas. He has a sister, Melissa, and was raised Lutheran.

Hiller is a 1994 graduate of Winston Churchill High School in San Antonio, where he performed in some of his earliest theater productions. He enrolled at Texas Lutheran University with the intention of becoming a pastor, and though he completed theology coursework, his love of performing deepened and he earned a bachelor’s degree in theater in 1998. During his junior year of college, he studied in Namibia.

== Career ==
Hiller started performing improv comedy with the Upright Citizens Brigade Theatre in 2001 where he was part of the improv teams People People, The Scam, Creep, Rumpleteaser and Police Chief Rumble. He taught improv comedy for a decade.

Hiller has appeared in various television series, including Guiding Light, Ugly Betty, 30 Rock, Law & Order: Criminal Intent, Psych, Unbreakable Kimmy Schmidt, and Community. Hiller appeared in the films Morning Glory and Ghost Town. Hiller was well-received for his performance as John Quincy Adams in the hit rock musical Bloody Bloody Andrew Jackson. In 2018, Hiller replaced Drew Droege's solo show Bright Colors and Bold Patterns off-Broadway, which was directed by Michael Urie.

Hiller played Joel for all three seasons of Bridget Everett's Peabody Award-winning series Somebody Somewhere (2022). Hiller won the 2025 Primetime Emmy Award for Outstanding Supporting Actor in a Comedy Series for his performance.

His memoir, Actress of a Certain Age: My Twenty-Year Trail to Overnight Success, was released June 10, 2025. On the first printing of the book, the spine was misspelled, missing an "R" in the word Certain; Hiller joked about it on The Daily Show with Desi Lydic.

In the 2025 revival of Urinetown, Hiller played the role of Mr. McQueen.

In June 2025, Hiller served as a panelist on NPR's Wait Wait... Don't Tell Me! and was interviewed by Terry Gross on Fresh Air in August 2025.

== Personal life ==
Hiller is gay and founded the all-gay improv troupe Neely O'Hara. Hiller is married to artist Neil Goldberg with whom he lives in New York City.

Hiller has a medical condition called morphea, which causes hair loss, as well as other dermatological changes. His character on the series Somebody Somewhere, Joel, also has the condition.

== Memoir ==
- Hiller, Jeff (2025). Actress of a Certain Age.

== Filmography ==
=== Films ===
| Year | Title | Role | Notes |
|---|---|---|---|
| 2008 | Dream Assassin | Waiter | Short |
| 2008 | Ghost Town | Naked Guy | |
| 2009 | Adam | Rom | |
| 2010 | Morning Glory | Sam - Channel 9 Producer | |
| 2011 | Bad Seed | Jeff | Short |
| 2012 | Gayby | Showgirls Fan Customer | |
| 2013 | Gods Behaving Badly | First Follower | |
| 2013 | That Thing with the Cat | Rick | |
| 2013 | Chasing Taste | Chef Micah | |
| 2013 | Snore (Downton Abbey) | Unnamed role | Short |
| 2013 | The Little Tin Man | Gregg | Independent film |
| 2015 | The Last Ones | Brad | Short |
| 2015 | The Poets | Leonard | Short |
| 2016 | Sing! | Mark | Voice role |
| 2018 | Greta | Maitre D' Henri | |
| 2018 | Set It Up | Mexican Restaurant Waiter | |
| 2020 | First One In | Frazzled Salesman | |
| 2024 | Lost & Found in Cleveland | Graham Hargreaves | |
| 2026 | Diary of a Wimpy Kid Christmas: The Getaway | First Class Flight Attendant | Voice role |

=== Television ===
| Year | Title | Role | Notes |
|---|---|---|---|
| 2004 | A2Z | Comedian Panelist | Episode: "Guns N' Roses" |
| 2005 | Starved | Gay Man | Episode: "3D" |
| 2006 | The P.A. | Jeff | 1 episode |
| 2008 | 30 Rock | Hotel Clerk | Episode: "Reunion" |
| 2008–2009 | Guiding Light | Francois the Tailor | 2 episodes |
| 2010 | Old Friends | Waiter | Episode: "Waverly Place" |
| 2010 | Submissions Only | Gay 4 (Sonny) | Episode: "Old Lace" |
| 2010 | Wiener & Wiener | Man | Episode: "Always a Bridesmaid" |
| 2010 | Ugly Betty | Wilheldiva Fan | Episode: "Chica and the Man" |
| 2011 | 30 Rock | Stewart | Episode: "Double-Edged Sword" |
| 2011 | Community | Glee Club Guy | Episode: "Regional Holiday Music" |
| 2011 | Bored to Death | Emcee | Episode: "Forget the Herring" |
| 2011 | Death Valley | Security Guard | Episode: "Tick... Tick... BOOM!" |
| 2011 | Psych | Dwayne | Episode: "Last Night Gus" |
| 2011 | Law & Order: Criminal Intent | Stan | 2 episodes |
| 2012 | Squad 85 | Macey | 3 episodes |
| 2012 | Partners | Randy | 2 episodes |
| 2012 | NTSF:SD:SUV:: | Don | Episode: "The Return of Dragon Shumway" |
| 2012 | Best Friends Forever | The Host | Episode: "Fatal Blow Out" |
| 2012–2013 | Campus Security | Lyle Moses | 6 episodes |
| 2013 | Raptor Raptor | Unnamed role | Episode: "How to Get a Job" |
| 2013 | Go On | Eric the Actor | Episode: "Urn-ed Run" |
| 2014 | Dead Boss | Timothy | TV movie |
| 2014 | The McCarthys | Phillip | 2 episodes |
| 2014 | UCB Comedy Originals | Unnamed roles | 2 episodes |
| 2014 | The Hotwives of Orlando | Antoine Donner | 4 episodes |
| 2014 | Long Distance | Matt | 1 episode |
| 2015 | The Hotwives of Las Vegas | Antoine Donner | 3 episodes |
| 2015 | Your Pretty Face Is Going to Hell | Wolfgang Ragekiss | Episode: "New-cronomicon" |
| 2015–2016 | Impastor | Jeffrey | 4 episodes |
| 2016 | Crazy Ex-Girlfriend | Harry | Episode: "That Text Was Not Meant for Josh!" |
| 2016–2017 | Nightcap | Phil Miller | 20 episodes |
| 2017 | Difficult People | Subway Man | Episode: "Sweet Tea" |
| 2017 | Broad City | Tim | Episode: "Sliding Doors" |
| 2017 | Playing House | Jeff | 3 episodes |
| 2017 | ASAP Fables | Lion | Episode: "The Lion and His Privilege" |
| 2017 | New York Is Dead | Dante | Web series |
| 2018 | Human Kind Of | Various roles | 10 episodes |
| 2018 | West 40s | Ryan | Episode: "Forty Candles" |
| 2019 | Unbreakable Kimmy Schmidt | Tomothy / Tomathy | 2 episodes |
| 2020 | Little America | Man with Cold | Episode: "The Silence" |
| 2022–2024 | Somebody Somewhere | Joel | 21 episodes |
| 2022 | American Horror Story: NYC | Gideon Whitely | 9 episodes |
| 2022 | Evil | Chuck | Episode: "The Demon of Parenthood" |
| 2022 | The Watcher | Therapist | Episode: "Haunting" |
| 2023 | FBI: Most Wanted | Rudolph Varitek | Episode: "Black Mirror" |
| 2023–2024 | American Horror Stories | Mr. Nevins | Episode: "Bestie" |
| 2023–2024 | American Horror Stories | Niles Taylor | Episode: "The Thing Under the Bed" |
| 2025 | Will Trent | Lance | Episode: "The Most Beautiful, Fierce, Smart, Powerful Creature in the Entire World" |
| 2025 | King of Drag | Himself; guest judge | Episode: "Comedy" |
| 2025 | Pluribus | Larry | Episode: "Please, Carol" |
| 2025–2026 | Stumble | Augustus | 2 episodes |
| 2026 | Elsbeth | Felix West | Episode: All's Hair |
| 2026 | Ghosts | Jeff | season 5 episode 13 "St. Hetty's Day 2: The Help" |
| 2026 | Widow's Bay | Dale | 6 Episodes |
| 2026 | Eternally Yours | Aldricht | season 1 episode 3 "The Mistake" |

=== Stage ===
| Year | Title | Role | Notes |
|---|---|---|---|
| 2004 | The Awesome 80s Prom | Michael Jay | Webster Hall, Off-Broadway |
| 2005 | Screwups: Little Plays about Big Mistakes | Brad/Herod | Manhattan Theatre at Washington Square Park |
| 2006 | Li'l Abner | Available Jones | Goodspeed Opera House |
| 2006 | Air Guitar | Ulrich | New York International Fringe Festival |
| 2006 | The Children | Molly | Barrow Street Theatre, Off-Broadway |
| 2008 | Emmet Otter's Jug Band Christmas | Will Possum/Charlie Muskrat | Goodspeed Opera House |
| 2010 | Bloody Bloody Andrew Jackson | Cobbler/Florida Man/John Quincy Adams/MessengerTour Guide | The Public Theater, Off-Broadway |
| 2010 | Bloody Bloody Andrew Jackson | Cobbler/Florida Man/John Quincy Adams/MessengerTour Guide | Bernard B. Jacobs Theatre, Broadway |
| 2011 | Baby Wants Candy | Performer | SoHo Playhouse, Off-Broadway |
| 2011 | Silence! The Musical | Pembry Miggs | Theater 80, Off-Broadway |
| 2013 | Love's Labour's Lost | Nathaniel | Delacorte Theater, Off-Broadway |
| 2013 | The Tempest | Trinculo | Delacorte Theater, Off-Broadway |
| 2014 | Bright Star | Daryl Ames | Old Globe Theatre |
| 2015 | Lady, Be Good | Bertie Bassett | New York City Center, Off-Broadway |
| 2015 | Up Here | The Critic | La Jolla Playhouse |
| 2017 | A Midsummer Night’s Dream | Francis Flute | Delacorte Theater, Off-Broadway |
| 2017 | The Rocky Horror Show | Narrator/Dr. Scott/Eddy | Bucks County Playhouse |
| 2018 | Heartbreak House | Nurse Guinness/Randall Utterword/The Burglar | Theatre Row, Off-Broadway |
| 2018 | Bright Colors and Bold Patterns | Gerry (Replacement) | SoHo Playhouse, Off-Broadway |
| 2019 | Hercules | Panic | Delacorte Theater, Off-Broadway |
| 2022 | Hyprov | Performer (Replacement) | Daryl Roth Theatre, Off-Broadway |
| 2025 | Urinetown | Mr. McQueen | New York City Center, Off-Broadway |
| 2026 | Celebrity Autobiography | Performer | Shubert Theatre, Broadway |
| 2026 | The Exhibitionist | Justin | SoHo Playhouse, Off-Broadway |
| 2027 | You're a Good Man, Charlie Brown | Schroeder | New York City Center, Off-Broadway |

=== Podcasts ===
| Year | Title | Role | Notes |
|---|---|---|---|
| 2020 | Escape from Virtual Island | Waiter / Man No. 1 / Crowd (voice) | 11 episodes |
| 2017 | Mission To Zyxx | Bruce the Glam Droid (voice) | 1 episode |

== Awards and nominations ==
| Year | Award | Category | Nominee(s) | Result | Ref. |
|---|---|---|---|---|---|
| 2022 | Peabody Awards | Entertainment | Somebody Somewhere | Won | |
| 2022 | Independent Spirit Awards | Best Supporting Performance in a New Scripted Series | Somebody Somewhere | Nominated | |
| 2025 | Primetime Emmy Awards | Outstanding Supporting Actor in a Comedy Series | Somebody Somewhere | Won | |
| 2026 | Primetime Emmy Awards | Outstanding Guest Actor in a Drama Series | Pluribus | Nominated | |
