= Neil Goldberg =

Neil Goldberg may refer to:

- Neil Goldberg (producer)
- Neil Goldberg (artist)
