= Hyprov =

Stage comedy show in Las Vegas, Nevada

Hyprov: Improv Under Hypnosis
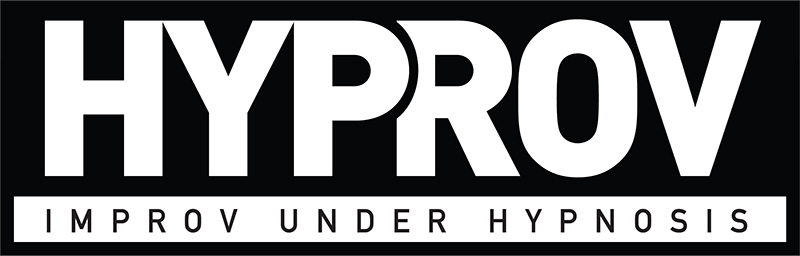
- Hyprov logo
- Genre: Hypnotism and improvisation
- Show type: Resident
- Date of premiere: June 10, 2023
- Location: Harrah's Las Vegas, Las Vegas Strip

Creative team
- Hypnotist: Asad Mecci
- Improvisational comedian: Colin Mochrie
- Co-creator: Jeff Andrews

Other information
- Producer: Sarah Power
- Official website

Hyprov: Improv Under Hypnosis (pronounced "hip-rawv") is a comedy show that is a fusion of stage hypnosis and improvisation. It was created by hypnotist Asad Mecci, improvisational comedian Colin Mochrie, and Mochrie's manager Jeff Andrews.

Mecci, who had performed a solo hypnosis comedy act on cruise ships, took improvisation classes at The Second City Training Center since he wanted to improve his show. His instructors taught him that instead of purposefully trying to generate funny scenes, he should let the scenes happen. The experience inspired him to propose creating a show that blended hypnotism and improvisation in a cold email to Mochrie suggesting a collaboration. Mecci and Mochrie workshopped the show, Hyprov, in 2015 at The Second City, where they did their first performance. After receiving enthusiastic reviews, they performed the show at the Just for Laughs Montreal festival and in 2016 at the Edinburgh Festival Fringe. After doing a 50-city tour in North America in 2019, they temporarily stopped owing to the COVID-19 pandemic. Mecci and Mochrie resumed doing shows in September 2021 and had their off-Broadway debut in August 2022 at the Daryl Roth Theatre, where they performed 70 shows. Hyprov started its residency at Harrah's Las Vegas in June 2023.

At the beginning of the show, Mecci asks for 20 volunteers to join him on stage. He attempts to hypnotize them and whittles the number down to four or five based on how receptive they are to hypnosis. The improvisational comedian—either Mochrie or another of a rotating group of celebrities—leads the scenes with the volunteers. Scenes include everyone having lost their belly buttons, proposing to the comedian, singing a duet, and attending a funeral after a pet's death. Another scene is a murder mystery radio broadcast where one volunteer is told to make incorrect sound effects while another acts out all characters in the story. The show received mostly positive reviews from critics. Of a 2016 performance, The Times theater critic Dominic Maxwell called it "a celebration of the human imagination" but said there was "a lot of admin for not enough laughs". The Wall Street Journal theater critic Charles Isherwood penned a positive review, writing, "It's catnip for those who relish the spontaneity and informality that this show and similar ones involve".

== History ==
Asad Mecci was born in 1975 in Northern Ontario and has a wife. His family came from Bangalore, India, which he last visited in his youth. After Mecci received a commerce degree from McMaster University, he began his hypnotist career in 1998. Mecci was a cruise ship performer who did hypnosis during his solo comedy act. He performed on ships owned by Carnival Cruise Line, Celebrity Cruises, Disney Cruise Line, and Royal Caribbean.

Wanting to refine his show Hypnohype, he enrolled in an improv course at The Second City Training Center in Toronto in 2015 at the recommendation of a friend. A class for beginner students contained activities that made their minds drawn in and disoriented. Mecci said that the activities prevented improvisers from contemplating what to do, leading to "automatic and unconscious" actions. The Second City teachers told him he should allow scenes to take place rather than deliberately attempt to create funny situations. The class inspired Mecci to believe he could use hypnosis to give people an equivalent experience. Through Colin Mochrie's website, Mecci in 2016 sent a cold email proposing that they collaborate on a live stage performance that was a fusion of hypnosis and improv. Mochrie's manager, Jeff Andrews, who received the message, was captivated by the suggested collaboration. Mochrie, who had been an improviser for roughly 40 years, liked when there were new ways to do the activity, and said, "I thought, I really can't get farther out of my comfort zone than this, working with people I’ve just met who are in a hypnotic state." In under 24 hours, Andrews responded, and Mecci and Mochrie had a get-together. Mochrie was an ensemble member of the Toronto chapter of The Second City. A few weeks after Mecci and Mochrie's meeting, they and Andrews developed the show Hyprov: Improv Under Hypnosis at The Second City in 2016. They leased The Second City Toronto venue John Candy Box Theatre to do testing during daytime hours.

Mecci is the hypnotist; Mochrie, who performs on Whose Line Is It Anyway? is the improvisational comedian; and Andrews is Mochrie's producer and marketer. Without doing any rehearsals, beginning in November 2015, they performed Hyprov at the end of The Second City's main show, leading people to give positive feedback and to fill the seats. Andrew recruited the actress and director Linda Kash to be Hyprov's director. Kash said, "There were two shows colliding – a meticulous performer used to working to a fixed format and the freedom of Colin’s improv. My objective was to create a unified show out of the two parts and to allow Colin ... to have a good time and to be challenged as well."

The group next put on the show at the Montreal comedy festival Just for Laughs where all seats were filled. Mochrie discussed the show in July 2016 at Just for Laughs London, where there was insufficient time for Mecci to do a hypnosis performance. They performed Hyprov at the Edinburgh performing arts festival Edinburgh Festival Fringe in August 2016. After they visited 50 North American cities to perform Hyprov in 2019, the COVID-19 pandemic put a pause on further performances. They returned to their tour in September 2021.

Hyprov made its off-Broadway debut on August 12, 2022, at the Daryl Roth Theatre. Cody Lassen was the show's executive producer, Stan Zimmerman directed it, and Bob Martin provided creative input. The music director was John Hilsen and the lighting designer was Jeff Croiter. The New Yorker's Dan Stahl said the lighting and music assist in "ground[ing] the shifting settings" and said Hilsen's keyboard accompaniment is "itself a feat of improvisation". The Wall Street Journal theater critic Charles Isherwood praised set designer Jo Winiarski for "creat[ing] a sleek environment that could easily be transposed to a television studio". Zachary Stewart of TheaterMania said the set was "part TED Talk, part cocktail lounge". Jeff Hiller took over Mochrie's role on October 19, 2022, and performed the remaining shows. Putting on 10 preview and 60 official shows, the show ran for 12 weeks until October 30, 2022. Hyprov was nominated for Best Unique Theatrical Experience at the 12th Off Broadway Alliance Awards held in 2023. By February 2023, Hyprov had completed over 190 performances.

Hyprov performed its first preview show on June 10, 2023, at Harrah's Showroom in Harrah's Las Vegas, where it is in residency. It rotates performances with Donny Osmond, who performs his own show at Harrah's. When Hyprov opened, Las Vegas Review-Journal entertainment columnist John Katsilometes said that shows focused on improv previously had not done well on the Las Vegas Strip. He cited Lin-Manuel Miranda's Freestyle Love Supreme, which when Miranda was not present failed to attract ticket purchasers. The show has an alternating cast: Mochrie, actress Stephanie Courtney, comedian Jonathan Mangum, and improvisational comedian Amber Nash. (Note: For the show having an alternating cast; For Mochrie; For Stephanie Courtney; For Jonathan Mangum; For Amber Nash)

== Show ==
The premise of Hyprov is that since self-consciousness is fatal to improv, self-consciousness should be extinguished through hypnosis. Hyprov's volunteers must be at least 18 years old, and the show does not use plants from the audience. Hyprov is a family-friendly show and does not discuss politics. Asad Mecci asks 20 volunteers to make their way to the stage to participate in the performance. To make the volunteers comfortable, hypnotist Mecci employs "a voice in a smooth dark register". Through "an auctioneer's rapid delivery", he makes everyone enter stupor. Employing numerous chanting, he tells the volunteers that they are thoroughly at peace. He says sentences like "Great eye contact, people on the stage" and "The deeper you go, the better you feel". As Mecci speaks, the show plays music composed by Rufus Wainwright. The Wall Street Journal theater critic Charles Isherwood described the music as "trance-inducing" and containing "Philip Glass-like piano arpeggios, tinkling chimes, humming". Based on the volunteers' amenability to hypnosis, Mecci eliminates the volunteers until only a few remain. Some of the volunteers are pretending to be hypnotized, while others would like to be hypnotized but fail to be affected. Looking at how they transform physiologically, Mecci said he relies on participants' revealing indicators that demonstrate their suitability to hypnosis. He cited examples such as alterations in their skin tone, skin color, and rate of breathing. Mecci said hypnosis-receptive volunteers direct a blank stare to him.

After Mecci has culled the number of volunteers, improvisational comedian Colin Mochrie largely leads the show. From roughly 12 improvisational scenes, he selects four or five to act out with remaining volunteers, who are called "hyprovisers". The audience offers recommendations and Mecci contributes plot surprises. Mecci tells the volunteers, "You will take this experiment very seriously." The scenes include a solo dance and a scene about a hybrid animal. In one skit, Mochrie is the detective in a murder mystery radio broadcast where one volunteer is told to use incorrect sound effects, while a second volunteer acts out the various characters including a mob hitman and an attractive secretary. In another skit, a volunteer is told to make a marriage proposal to Mochrie with the requirement that it must be done while he is sitting. Mochrie delays the proposal by standing up and doing other things. He accepts the proposal once it is made, explaining, "It's such an emotional, lovely moment. They're truly in love with me." In a show, a volunteer told to propose starts interrogating Mochrie after noticing Mochrie is wearing a wedding ring. With the volunteer asking whether Mochrie was deceiving him, Mochrie concocted an explanation for the ring that did not hurt the volunteer. In another scene, Mecci tells the volunteers they have lost their belly buttons, prompting a volunteer during a New York show to shout out, "I know I had my belly button when I got here!" One scenario features Mochrie and a volunteer singing a duet.

Mochrie praised the hypnotized volunteers for being completely unreserved, making their performances frequently unexpected and exhilarating. He contrasted this with his Whose Line Is It Anyway? co-stars, whose responses he could predict despite their doing improvisation. He said the volunteers were like "stoned people" since they have substantially delayed responses. Improvisers follow the yes, and... concept where they agree to and build on their collaborators' ideas. Confident that volunteers would follow the "yes", Mochrie initially was apprehensive that they would follow the "and" but found the hypnotized volunteers followed the established premises. Whereas people new to improvising frequently fillers like "um" and "uh", the hypnotized volunteers do not. Mochrie said that after performing the show numerous times, they learned that the scene premises had to be unambiguous and uncomplicated. Easily understood scenes include a volunteer having to attend a funeral after a pet's death and needing to make a marriage proposal to Mochrie. When volunteers are doing an outstanding job in their role, Mochrie allows them space to showcase their talents. When volunteers struggle to be communicative, Mochrie takes a more active role.

== Reception ==
Forbes described 'Hyprov' as a 'wild hypnosis improv show,' noting its successful run at Harrah's Las Vegas. Jason Zinoman of The New York Times observed, 'the show I saw featured performers as committed as any improv comic I had seen. The audience erupted in laughter,' signifying its widespread appeal and comedic effectiveness. Dan Stahl of The New Yorker offered a positive take, remarking, 'You can say yes to "Hyprov" without fear of the show putting you to sleep—unless, that is, you volunteer for it,’ highlighting the show's engaging and entertaining nature. Grace Robinson of Varsity admitted, 'Real or not, it was most certainly a hell of a lot of fun,' giving it 4 out of 5 stars.

Reviewing a 2016 Just for Laughs London performance, The Times theater critic Dominic Maxwell gave the show two stars out of five, criticizing it for having "a lot of admin for not enough laughs". Noting that "there were too many moments in which participants appeared groggy rather than freewheeling", he said that the audience frequently seemed to be experiencing mirth at the expense of the volunteers rather than alongside them. Maxwell praised a scene in the show where Mochrie eulogized Henry VIII as a volunteer did a sign language interpretation of the speech that was delightfully literal. He said of the moment, "It felt like a celebration of the human imagination." Calling the show "great fun", The Scotsman comedy critic Kate Copstick rated it three stars, writing, "a regular (but very good) hypnotism show with a clever, funny bloke doing the suggestions for what the subjects should get up to and interacting with them, rather than the hypnotist".

In a positive review of the 2022 off Broadway run, The Wall Street Journal theater critic Charles Isherwood said, "It's catnip for those who relish the spontaneity and informality that this show and similar ones involve" and praised improvisational comedian Colin Mochrie for being "a slightly sinister but still audience-engaging presence". Deeply impressed was he by the volunteers' performance, he initially speculated that they were "plants" who had been chosen before the show, but concluded it was probable for audience members in New York to be adept in improv. Rating the off Broadway show four out of five stars, Adam Feldman of Time Out called the show a "hilarious and fascinating fusion of unpredictable art forms". Zachary Stewart of TheaterMania wrote, "they weren't significantly funnier than what you might encounter at the Peoples Improv Theater after finally agreeing to see your co-worker's amateur troupe — at least not on the night I attended. ... Hyprov feels like a 100-minute episode of Whose Line, with tried-and-true games, family-friendly subjects, and nary a word uttered that the FCC might find objectionable."
