= Harrah's Las Vegas =

Hotel casino in Las Vegas, Nevada

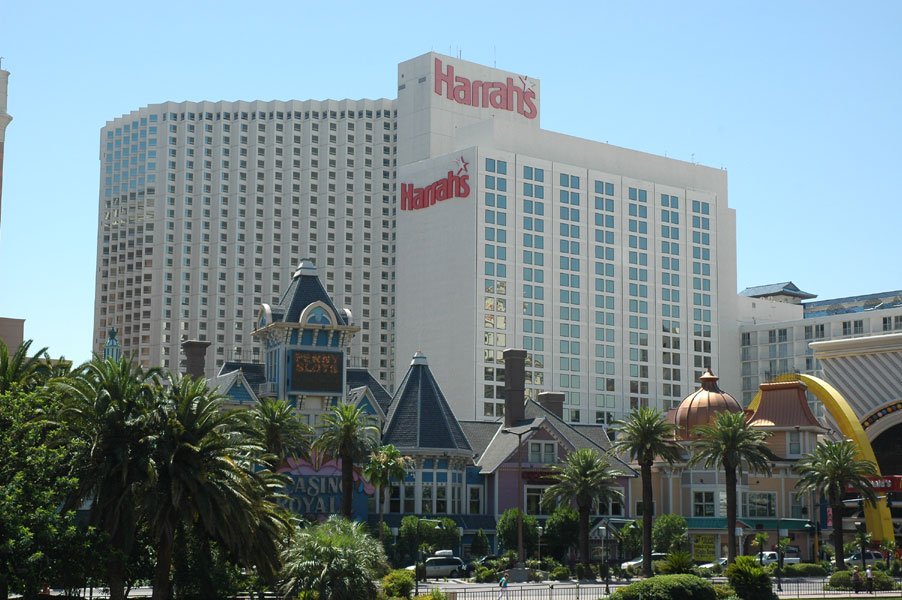
- Harrah's Las Vegas in 2006

- Location within Las Vegas Strip Location within Nevada
- Interactive map of Harrah's Las Vegas
- Location: Las Vegas, Nevada, U.S.; 3475 South Las Vegas Boulevard; 36°7′10″N 115°10′15″W
- Opened: February 1, 1972; 54 years ago (hotel); July 2, 1973; 53 years ago (casino)
- Theme: Carnival; Mardi Gras
- No. of rooms: 2,542
- Gaming space: 90,637 sq ft (8,420.5 m^{2})
- Permanent shows: Menopause The Musical; Mac King (2000–2021); Tenors of Rock (2017–2019); X Country
- Signature attractions: Carnaval Court
- Notable restaurants: Flavors, The Buffet (until 2020); Fulton Street Food Hall; Oyster Bar; Ruth's Chris Steak House; Toby Keith's I Love This Bar & Grill (2005–2020)
- Casino type: Land-based
- Owner: Vici Properties
- Operating license holder: Caesars Entertainment (formerly Eldorado Resorts)
- Previous names: Holiday Casino (1973–1992)
- Renovated in: 1975, 1982, 1986, 1989–90, 1996–97, 2006, 2015, 2018, 2020–21
- Website: caesars.com/harrahs-las-vegas

Harrah's Las Vegas is a hotel and casino centrally located on the Las Vegas Strip in Paradise, Nevada. It is owned by Vici Properties and operated by Caesars Entertainment (formerly Eldorado Resorts). The property originally opened as a joint venture with Holiday Inn. Construction began in April 1970, and the hotel portion opened on February 1, 1972, as the Holiday Inn Center Strip. The casino portion, known as the Holiday Casino, opened on July 2, 1973. Shelby Williams was among the casino's investors. After his death in 1977, his wife Claudine Williams took over operations. Holiday Inn purchased an interest in the casino operation in 1979 and bought out Williams entirely in 1983, although she would remain as chairwoman.

In 1990, Holiday Inn transferred ownership of the resort to The Promus Companies, which then ended the franchise agreement with the hotel company. The property was renamed Harrah's Las Vegas in April 1992, and Promus would change its name to Harrah's Entertainment in 1995, before ultimately becoming Caesars Entertainment. The land was sold to Vici in 2017, and Caesars continues operating Harrah's Las Vegas through a 15-year leaseback agreement.

The casino originally featured a riverboat façade, which was enlarged in 1990, as part of a $100 million renovation and expansion project. The riverboat theme was removed in a subsequent $200 million project which concluded in 1997, adding a Carnival and Mardi Gras theme instead. The hotel includes 2,542 rooms, located across three buildings: the original 14-story tower, a 23-story tower completed in 1982, and a 35-story tower added in 1990. A 35-story addition was made to the third tower during the 1997 expansion.

In addition to a showroom, the property also has an outdoor bar and entertainment area known as Carnaval Court, and it featured a branch of The Improv comedy club from 1995 to 2016. The resort has featured numerous entertainers, including singer Clint Holmes (2000–2006) and magician Mac King (2000–2021). It has also hosted shows such as Legends in Concert (2009–2013), Million Dollar Quartet (2013–2016), and Menopause The Musical.

== History ==
The resort was built on property once occupied by the Tumbleweed motel, built in 1946; and the Pyramids motel, built in 1952. The Pyramids, a 20-unit motel, was the first project for Las Vegas real estate developer Irwin Molasky. The Tumbleweed would later become the Sand Dunes, and was destroyed in a 1968 fire.

=== Holiday Inn and Holiday Casino (1973–1992) ===
In March 1969, plans were announced for a riverboat-themed casino to be built on the property. Holiday Queen Land Corporation would develop it and the project would include a hotel in partnership with Holiday Inn. Holiday Queen would own the casino and Holiday Inn would operate the hotel under its eponymous brand. Groundbreaking took place on April 2, 1970. The 520-room hotel opened on February 1, 1972, as the Holiday Inn Center Strip, named for its location at the center of the Las Vegas Strip. It consisted of a 14-story tower. The adjacent Pyramids motel was purchased later that year for $750,000, and was demolished to provide additional parking space.

During construction, the gaming portion was known as the River Queen Casino. It opened as the Holiday Casino on July 2, 1973. It included 320 slot machines and 20 table games, and catered to a middle-class clientele. The casino's primary investors included Shelby Williams and Norman Jenson. Williams served as the casino's president and board chairman. He and his wife Claudine Williams had previously owned the Silver Slipper casino in the 1960s. Shelby Williams died in 1977, at the age of 66, after a lengthy illness. Claudine Williams took over operations, a rarity in the Nevada gaming industry, which generally consisted of men. In 1979, Holiday Inn bought a 40 percent share of the casino's parent company, Riverboat, Inc, and Claudine Williams retained the other 60 percent.

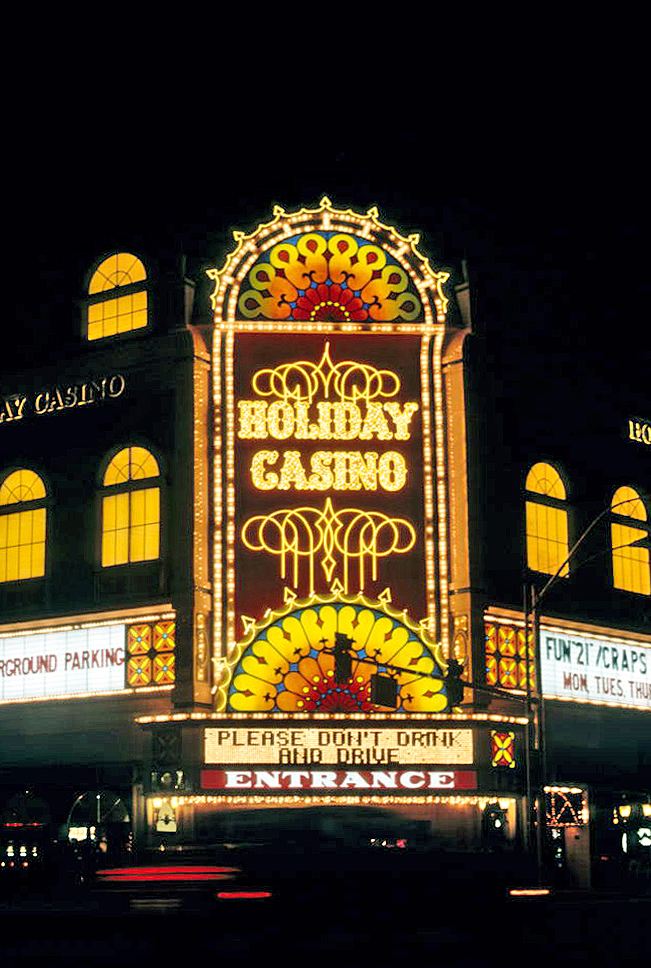
Three-story addition, seen in 1989

In 1980, construction began on a 23-story tower addition with 494 rooms. It was finished in 1982, and the hotel became the world's largest Holiday Inn, with 991 rooms. The project also increased the size of the casino. Holiday Inn bought out Williams's remaining 60-percent interest in 1983. She remained as chairwoman of the property for years after the sale.

In 1986, construction of a three-story casino addition began in front of the resort. During the groundbreaking ceremony, outdated gaming chips from the Holiday Casino – totaling $380,000 – were dumped into the addition's cement foundation by executives. A spokeswoman said the chips would add "color and history" to the new structure, which was built by Marnell Corrao Associates. Aside from adding casino space, the addition also included a new showroom. The hotel rooms also were renovated.

A one-year, $100 million renovation and expansion began in 1989, in an effort to compete with newer resorts. The project included the addition of a third tower, rising 35 stories. It added 734 rooms for a total of 1,725, retaining the hotel's title as largest Holiday Inn. The casino also was expanded by 12,500 sq ft (1,160 m^{2}), for a total of 74,000 sq ft (6,900 m^{2}). Also, a parking garage was added.

=== Harrah's Las Vegas (1992–present) ===
Holiday Inn had previously purchased Harrah's, Inc. in 1980. Ten years later, Holiday Inn's eponymous hotel brand was sold to Bass PLC. A corporate spinoff, The Promus Companies, was created by Holiday Inn to oversee several brands not included in the sale to Bass PLC, including Harrah's. In October 1991, Promus announced that it would end its franchise agreement with Holiday Inn and rename the Las Vegas property under its Harrah's brand. The name change was finalized in April 1992.

An early morning robbery occurred in April 1994, when four young men entered Harrah's and robbed the casino cage at gunpoint. A fifth man operated the getaway vehicle for the group, which consisted of Los Angeles gang members. They were apprehended after a 20-minute police chase, and were sentenced to prison. Two other men who planned out the robbery were also sentenced. The stolen money, approximately $100,000, was never recovered. It was apparently handed off to another vehicle prior to the police chase.

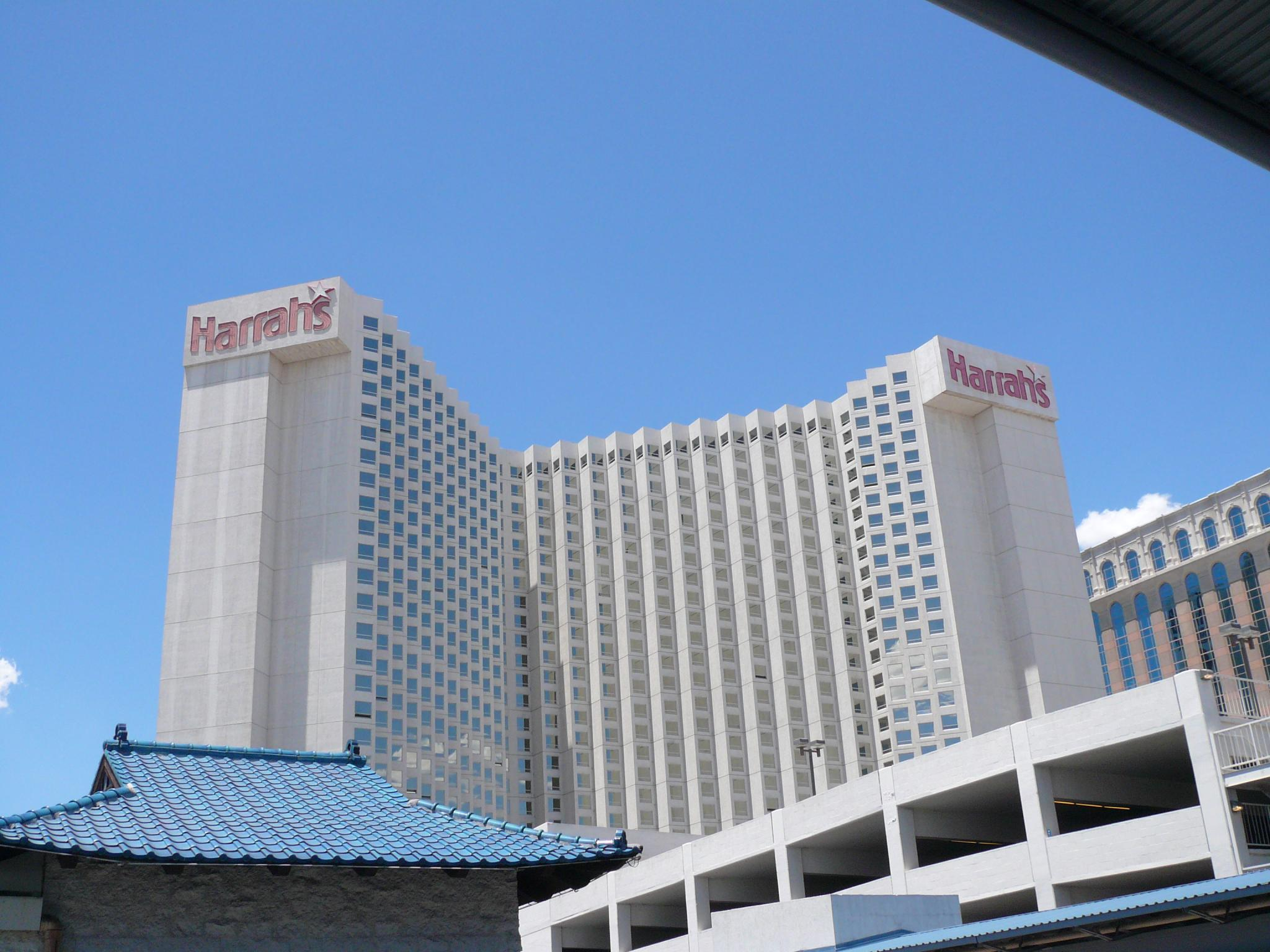
Rear of Harrah's 35-story tower, 2009

Promus was renamed Harrah's Entertainment in 1995. A year later, the company began a $200 million renovation and expansion of the Las Vegas property. The first phase of the project, a 10,000 sq ft (930 m^{2}) casino addition, was opened in October 1996. In total, the casino was expanded by 30,000 sq ft (2,800 m^{2}), and a 35-story addition was made to the third tower, among other changes. The additions were officially unveiled with an opening ceremony in October 1997, while final touches were concluded later that year.

In September 2000, two men were suspected of stealing from distracted gamblers in the casino. When approached by security guards, one of the men fled before guards took him down. During the struggle, he pulled out a gun and fired two shots, one injuring a guard and the other killing a 29-year-old woman. Both men were soon apprehended.

In September 2007, Clark County building officials opened an investigation into unauthorized renovations that took place at the Rio, another Las Vegas resort owned by Harrah's Entertainment. The investigation revealed that hotel renovations had also taken place at Harrah's Las Vegas in 2006, without permitting. In October 2007, Harrah's Entertainment closed approximately 600 rooms at Harrah's Las Vegas, allowing for investigative work and possible remediation. Various fire safety hazards were uncovered, including some floors which lacked caulking, a material used to prevent smoke from spreading. The hotel reopened 501 rooms a month later, while another 166 continued to be brought up to code. The resort's chief engineer faced several misdemeanor citations, and Harrah's Entertainment closed a remodeling subsidiary which oversaw the unauthorized work. The charges were eventually dismissed.

Harrah's Entertainment was renamed Caesars Entertainment in 2010. A $25 million renovation of the casino floor took place in 2015, adding new flooring, furniture, and slot machines.

In November 2017, Caesars announced it would sell the land to Vici Properties for $1.14 billion. Caesars would continue operating Harrah's for 15 years through a leaseback agreement. The sale was completed the following month.

A renovation of the 1,622-room Valley Tower was completed in 2018, at a cost of $140 million. It was the tower's first renovation in more than a decade. Renovations on the rest of the hotel concluded in 2020, as part of a $200 million, multi-year renovation, which was finished in June 2021. The project included renovations on the casino floor, and new purple neon signage on the resort's exterior. A sky bridge was also built to connect Harrah's to the new Caesars Forum convention facility.

== Features ==
In 1988, the Holiday Casino became the first in Nevada to introduce computerized bingo. Like other casinos on the Las Vegas Strip, Harrah's closed its poker room in 2000, amid a decline in demand. The following year, it introduced blackjack tables limited to five seats, a popular feature among players. At the time, it was the only casino on the Strip to offer such a feature. As of 2017, the casino measures 90,637 sq ft (8,420.5 m^{2}). The casino floor includes a humorous statue depicting a wealthy couple, Buck and Winnie Greenback, and their poodle Chip, surrounded by money. It is a popular photo spot.

The hotel has 2,542 rooms, and is popular as a low-cost alternative to larger, nearby resorts.

In 1990, the Holiday Casino added an outdoor shopping plaza, named and themed after Jackson Square in New Orleans. An outdoor retail and entertainment area, known as Carnaval Court, was added in the 1997 expansion. It includes a bar and is host to live music.

=== Design ===
The enlarged riverboat façade, seen following the 1992 Harrah's rebranding

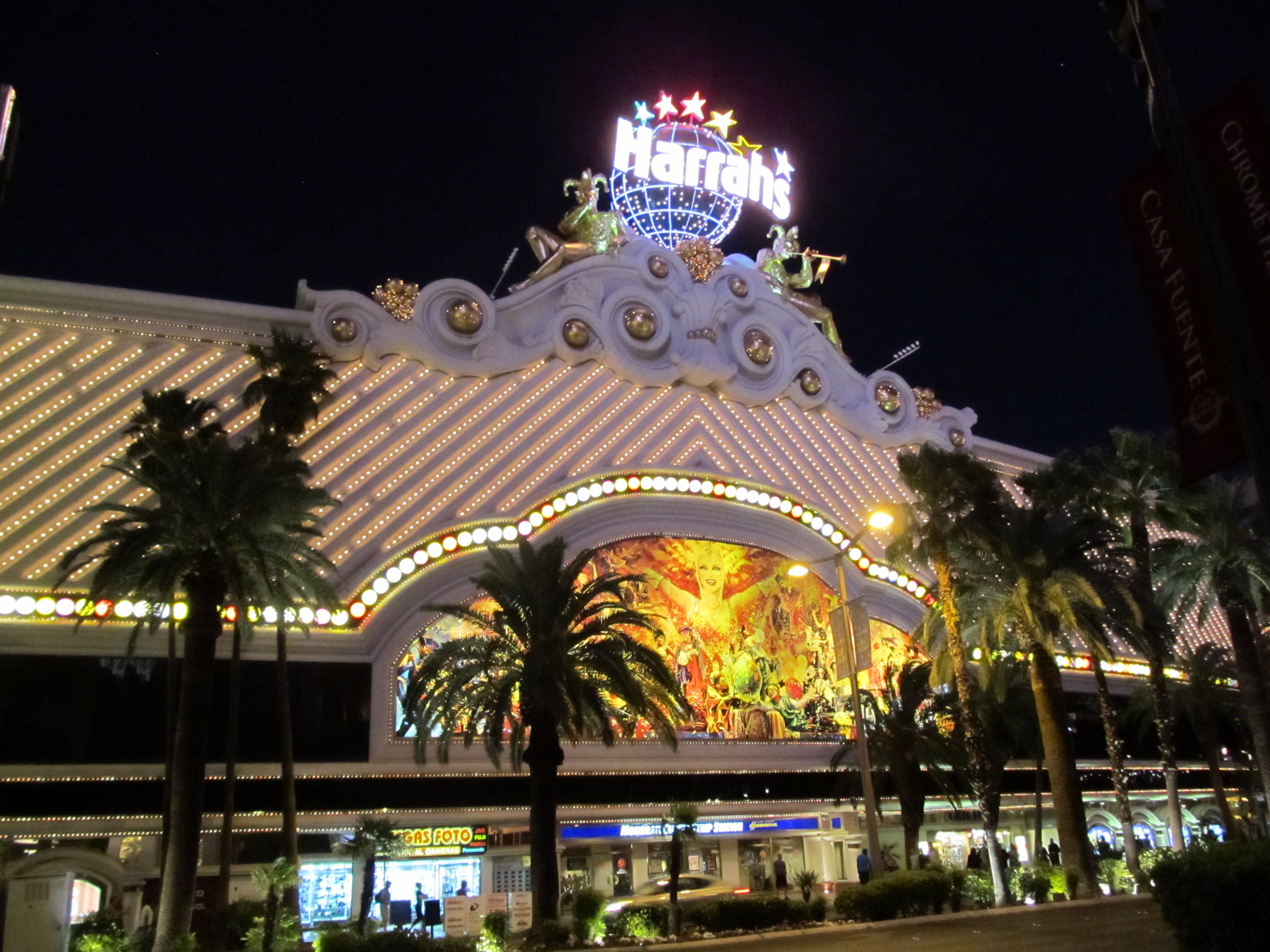
Harrah's updated façade, seen in 2013

Both the Holiday Inn and Holiday Casino were designed by architect Homer Rissman. Under the direction of the Holiday Inn company, Rissman designed the hotel portion as a plain, white-colored building, differentiating it from the separately operated casino. The casino's exterior design was inspired by the Robert E. Lee steamboat, while the interior was replicated from the grand saloon onboard the Grand Republic riverboat. A casino addition in 1975 featured an exterior resembling an old-fashioned excursion boat. This addition was attached to the original riverboat-themed casino building.

The riverboat façade was revamped and expanded in 1990, now consisting of a 450-foot-long Mississippi-style riverboat with an 80-foot paddlewheel and two 85-foot-tall smokestacks. It stretched along the Las Vegas Strip. The new façade was built at a cost of $30 million, and casino executives hoped that it would become a popular tourist attraction.

The 1997 renovation, by designer Henry Conversano, removed the riverboat façade and added a Carnival/Mardi Gras theme to the resort. A 30-by-90-foot mural was added to the new façade, along with several jester statues, covered in gold leaf and weighing 22,000 lb (10,000 kg) each.

=== Restaurants ===
Several new restaurants were added in the 1997 renovation, while existing restaurants were redesigned. Among the new restaurants was the Range, a 12,000 sq ft (1,100 m^{2}) steakhouse on the second floor overlooking the Las Vegas Strip. It offered a large selection of wines. Other additions included a new buffet and cafe.

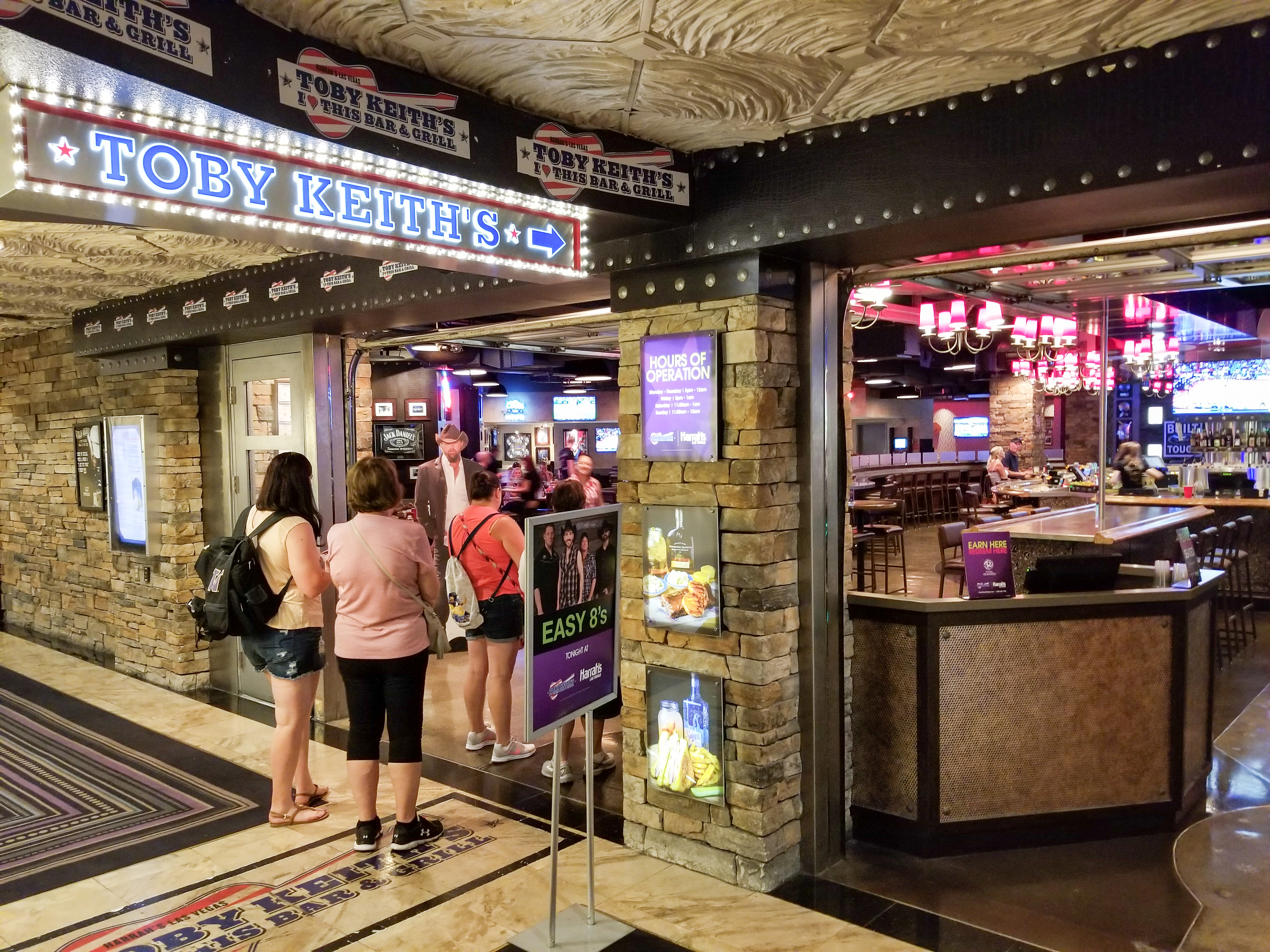
Toby Keith's I Love This Bar & Grill, 2018

In 2004, Harrah's partnered with country singer Toby Keith to open a restaurant and bar at the resort. It opened the following year, as Toby Keith's I Love This Bar & Grill, part of a chain named after his 2003 song "I Love This Bar". The resort also includes a popular oyster bar, which opened in 2006. Several restaurants were also renovated that year, including the Fresh Market Buffet, which was renamed Flavors, The Buffet.

From 2010 to 2015, the casino included a restaurant by chef Kerry Simon known as Kerry's Gourmet Burgers (KGB). The Range was replaced in 2013 by a Ruth's Chris Steak House seating nearly 400 people. A food court, Fulton Street Food Hall, was added in 2014.

In February 2020, Buddy Valastro opened a pizzeria and sweets eatery known as PizzaCake. Bobby's Burgers opened a location in the Fulton Street Food Hall at the end of 2021. A Walk-On's Sports Bistreaux opened early the following year, and was the first location to offer a breakfast menu. It was also the first location to open on the U.S. west coast, and is one of the largest locations at nearly 12,000 sq ft (1,100 m^{2}). It replaced Keith's restaurant, which closed in 2020.

Chef Gordon Ramsay opened a restaurant, Ramsay's Kitchen, in 2022.

== Shows and entertainers ==
The resort has hosted numerous shows and entertainers. Rocky Sennes produced three shows for the property while it was known as the Holiday Casino. A comedy dance show, Wild World of Burlesque, opened in 1974, and ran until 1985. It was replaced by a 1920s tribute show titled Roaring '20s. In 1988, Sennes replaced it with Keep Smilin' America. A magic show, Spellbound, began a 13-week run in early 1992, replacing Keep Smilin' America. Due to its success, Spellbound would be extended several times, eventually ending in 1999.

A branch of The Improv comedy club was opened at Harrah's in April 1995, and continued operating for the next 21 years, until Caesars closed the space. In addition to comedy acts, it also served as a second showroom. In 1999, the Improv Showroom debuted Washington Sexcapades 2000, a political comedy show co-starring Steve Rossi and Sandy Hackett.

Clint Holmes signed on as the resort's resident headliner in 1999, taking over the former Spellbound Theater, which was renamed the Clint Holmes Theatre. He began entertaining there in January 2000. After more than 1,800 performances, Holmes concluded his run in September 2006. Magician Mac King also began entertaining at Harrah's in 2000, and continued performing there for more than 20 years. In 2021, he relocated his show to the Excalibur resort. Other entertainers at Harrah's have included Rita Rudner, The Righteous Brothers, Big Elvis, Ralphie May, and Tape Face.

Skintight, an adult-themed musical show, opened in 2000. It featured a variety of songs. Producer Greg Thompson described the show as "MTV meets Playboy". Cynthia Brimhall, a Playboy Playmate, was among the show's dancers. It ran in the Clint Holmes Theater and had a 70-minute runtime. Skintight ended in 2006, and was replaced by Bareback, a topless musical show also by Thompson. Bareback featured a country music soundtrack. The show previously played at Harrah's Reno, and its success there prompted the move to Las Vegas, where it ended after a five-month run.

Legends in Concert, one of the longest-running shows in Las Vegas history, moved to Harrah's in 2009, relocating from the adjacent Imperial Palace casino. The show features singers who impersonate notable performers such as Elvis Presley and David Bowie. It ran at Harrah's for four years. Million Dollar Quartet, a musical, opened in 2013. It surpassed 1,000 performances in 2015, before closing a year later. Menopause The Musical opened in the Improv Showroom in 2015. It later moved to the Harrah's Cabaret space, and continues its run as of 2021. Since 2016, Harrah's has also featured X Country, a country music-themed adult revue.

Tenors of Rock, a rock cover band consisting of British tenors, performed in the Harrah's Showroom from 2017 to 2019. Singer Donny Osmond began a residency at Harrah's in 2021. Hyprov, a comedy show that is a fusion of stage hypnosis and improvisation, performed its first preview show on June 10, 2023, at the Harrah's Showroom, where it is in residency.

== Gallery ==
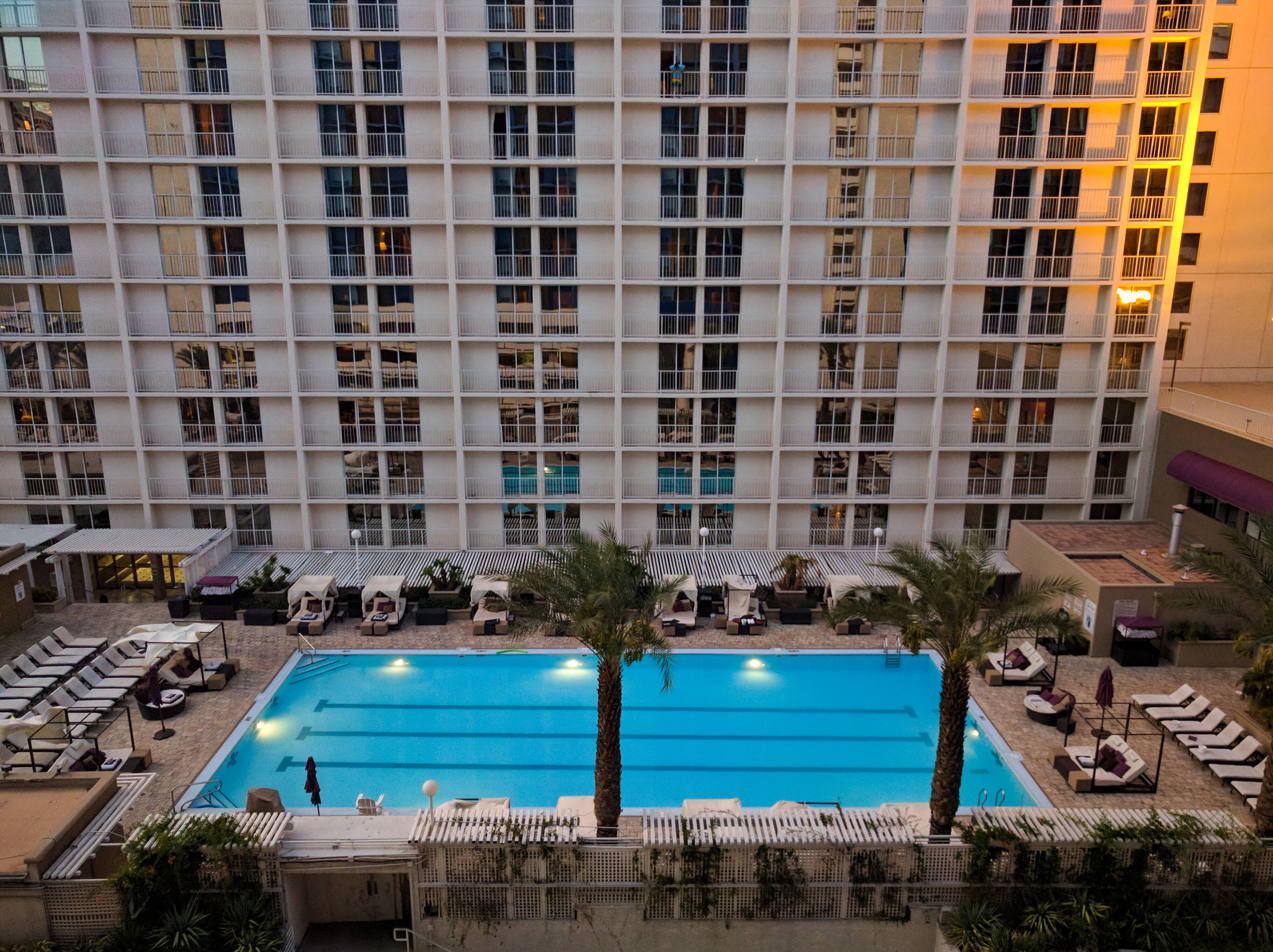
The original 14-story tower overlooking the pool

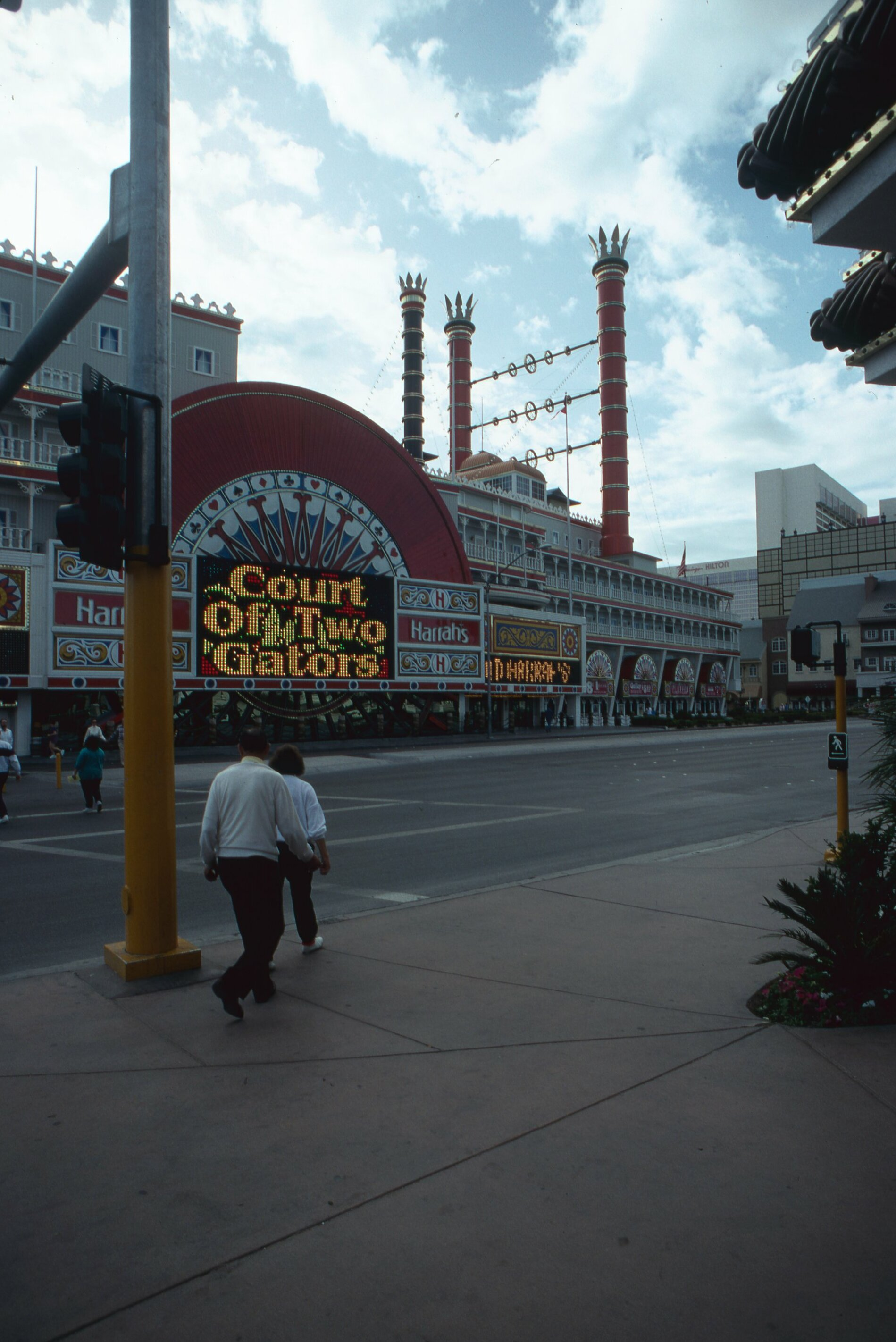
Second riverboat façade, May 1993

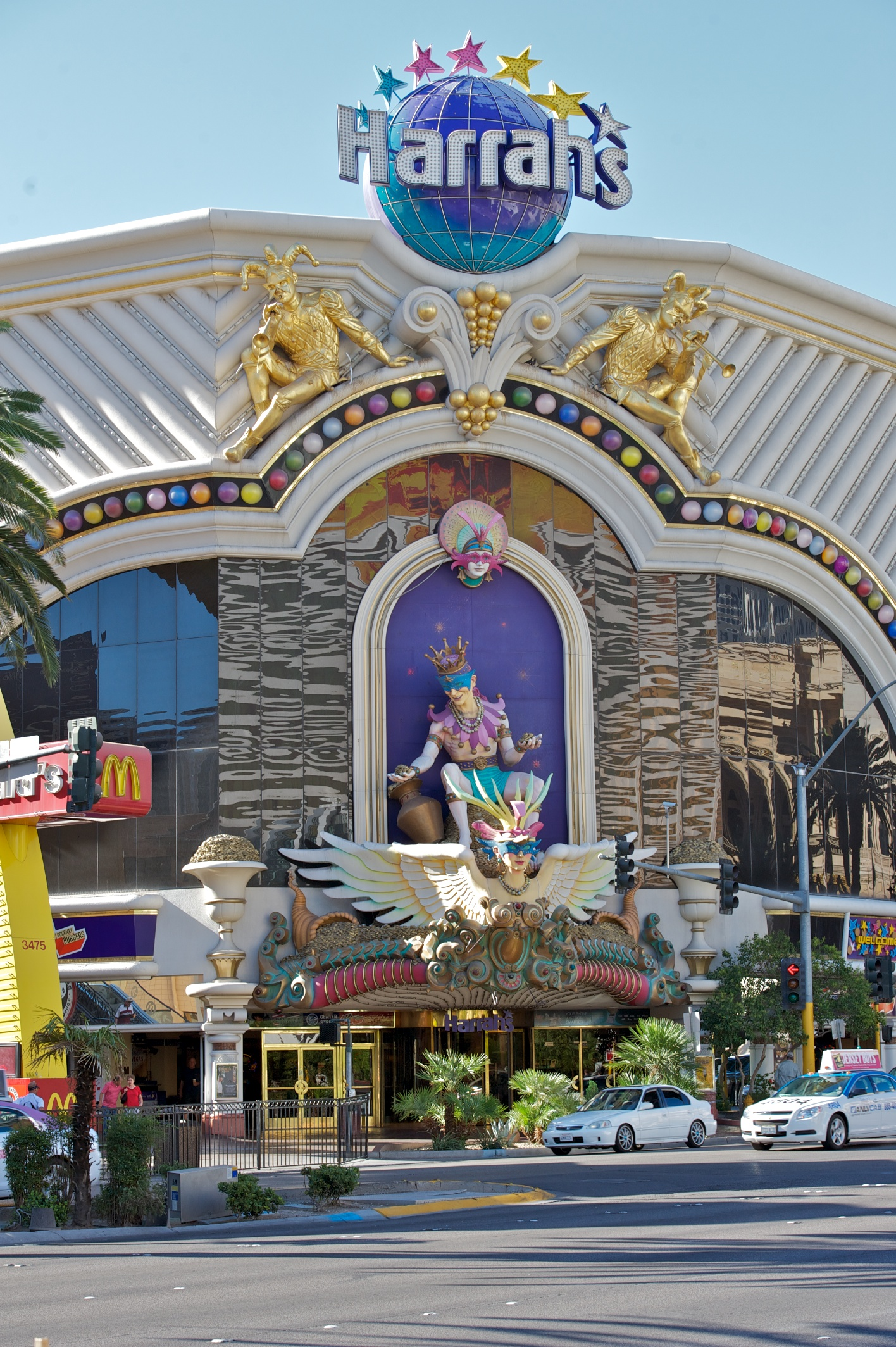
Harrah's northwest entrance

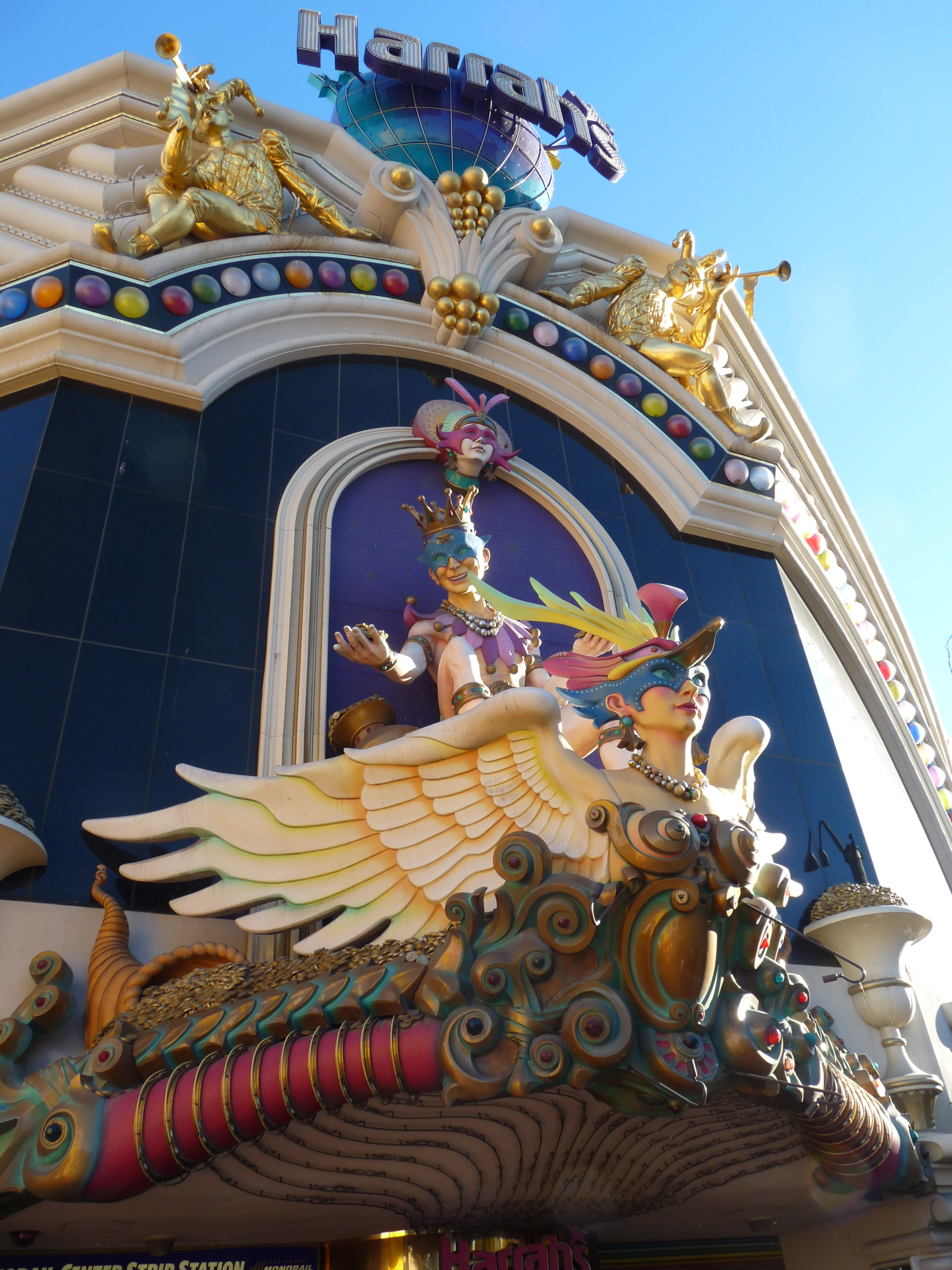
Mardi Gras décor

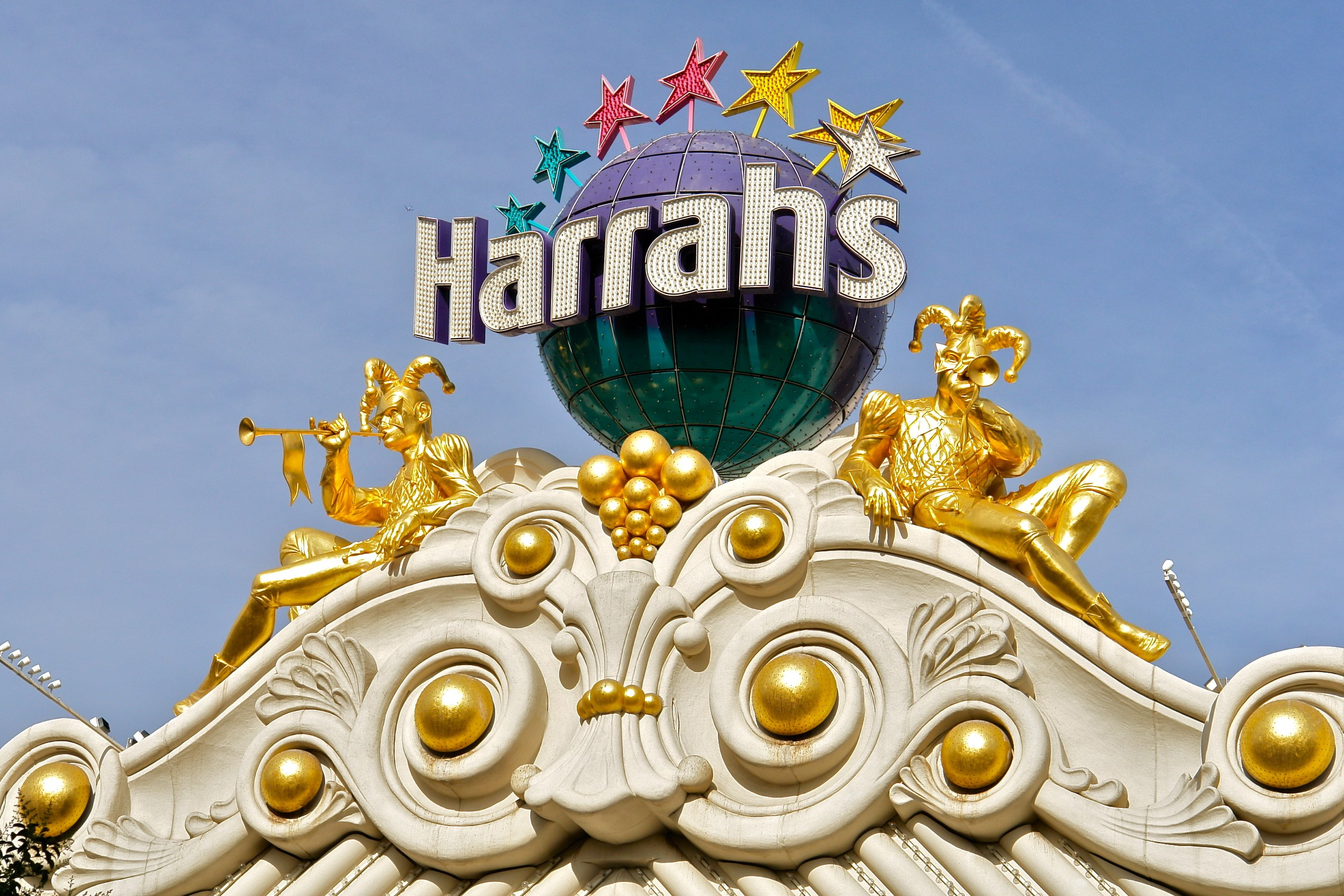
Gold jesters atop the façade

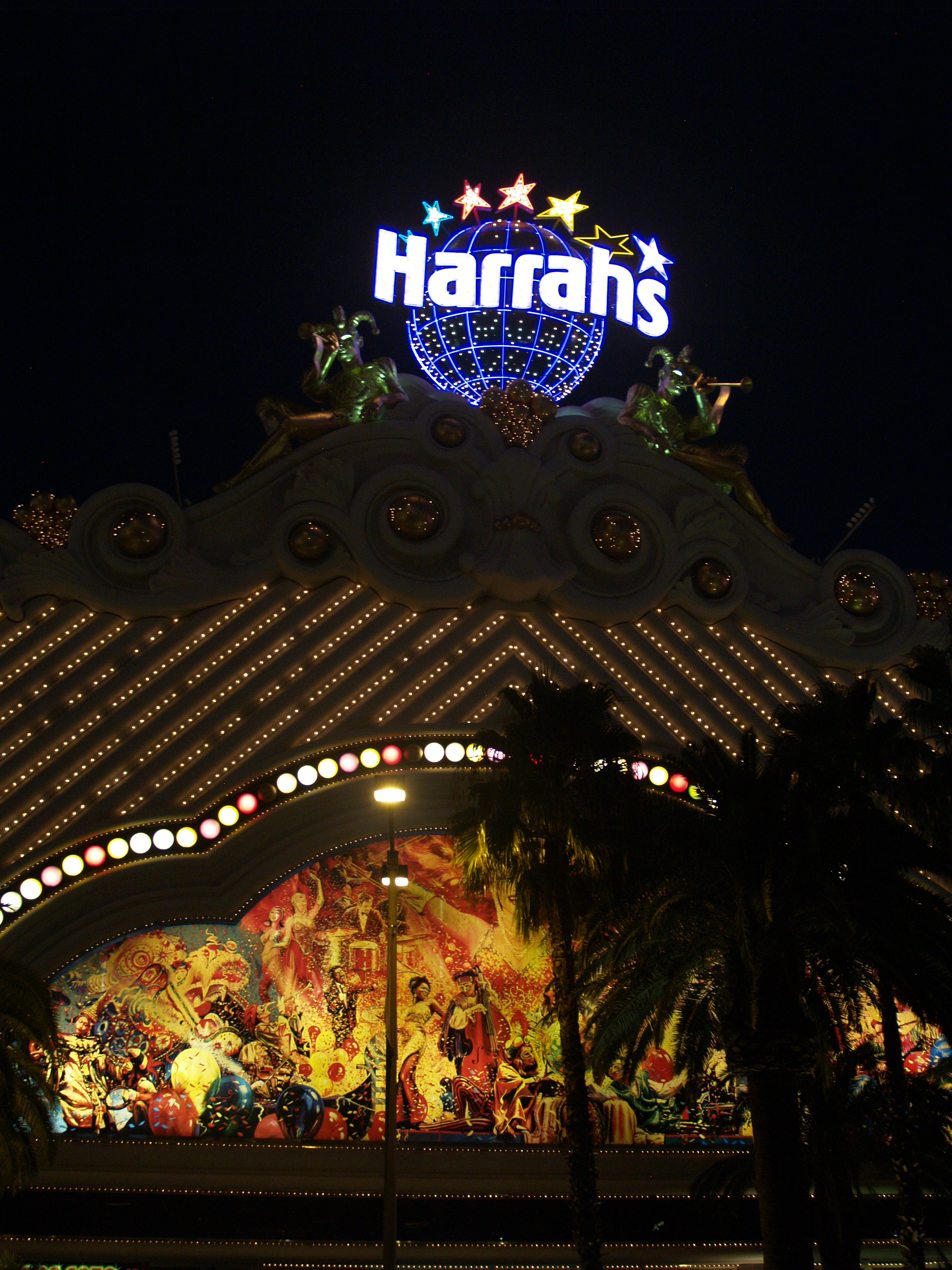
Façade at night

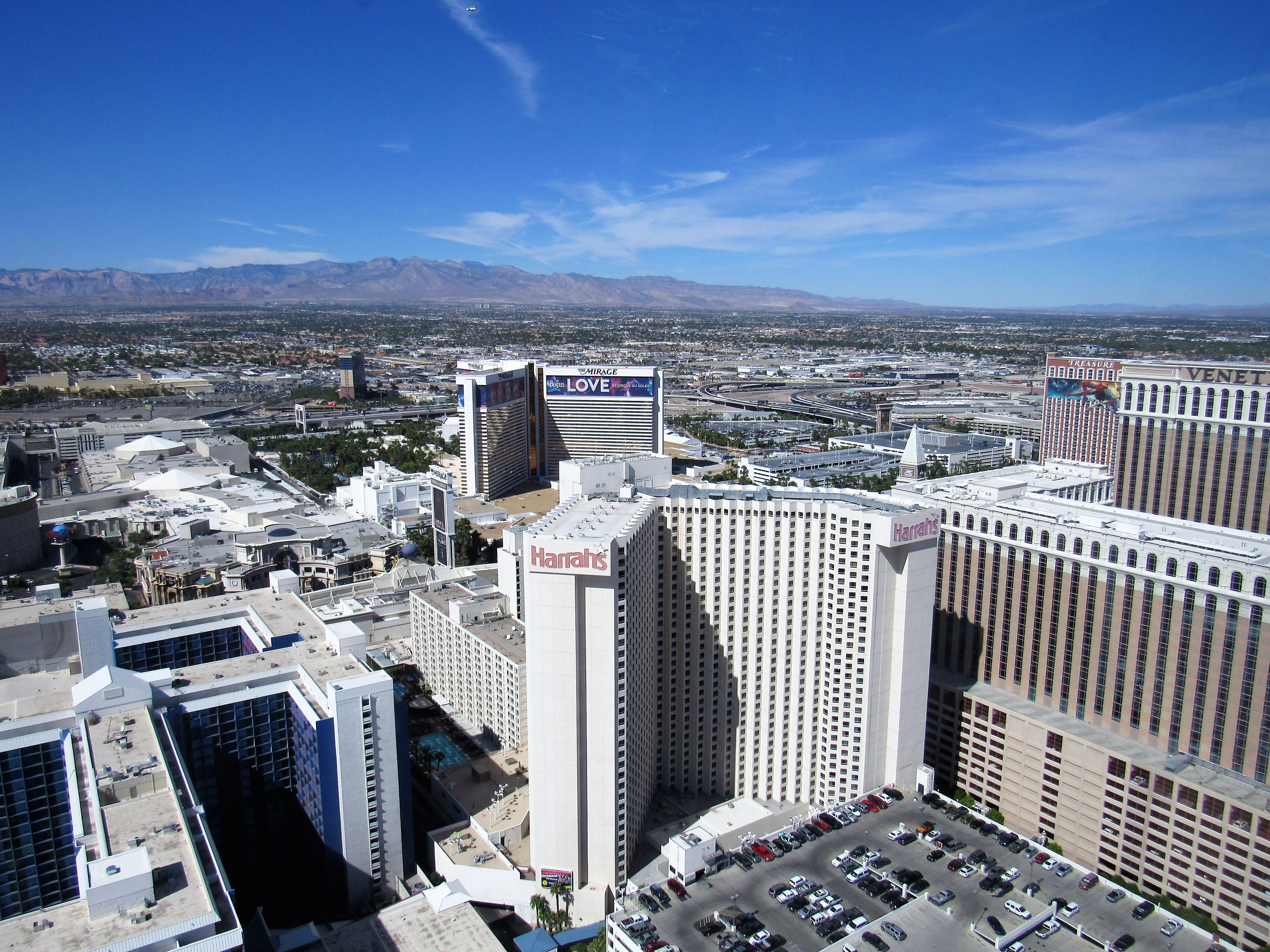
Hotel towers, seen from the nearby High Roller Ferris wheel, 2019

== See also ==
- List of integrated resorts
