= 44: The Musical =

2022 comedy musical

- Music: Eli Bauman
- Book: Eli Bauman
- Basis: Presidency of Barack Obama
- Premiere: 2022: The Bourbon Room

44: The Musical (full title: 44: The UnOFFICIAL, UnSANCTIONED OBAMA MUSICAL) is a 2022 musical written and composed by Eli Bauman, a former Obama campaign staffer.

== Synopsis ==
A musical about the Obama presidency, as Joe Biden "kinda sorta remembers it."

== Production history ==
=== World premiere ===
The show made its world premiere at The Bourbon Room Hollywood, running November 2-15, 2022. It reopened at the same theatre the following year from October 11 to November 18 2023.

=== Chicago ===
44: The Musical ran at Epiphany Center for the Arts August 7-16 2024.

=== Los Angeles ===
The show had a limited run at the Kirk Douglas Theatre from February 23 to March 23, 2025. It became the highest grossing show in Kirk Douglas Theatre history.

=== Off-Broadway ===
Previews began for the off-Broadway production on October 14, 2025 at the Daryl Roth Theatre. Opening night was November 6, and the show was originally scheduled to run through December 7 before being extended to January 4, 2026.

Set of 44: The Musical at the Daryl Roth Theater in November 2025

=== Washington, D.C. ===
It also appeared at the Shakespeare Theatre Company, Klein Theatre for an extended run from April 18 to May 24, 2026.

== Musical Numbers ==
Act I

- "M.F.O" – Company
- "Just Ask Joe" – Joe Biden & Ensemble
- "Red States Blue States" – Barack Obama & Ensemble
- "My Turn" – Hillary Clinton
- "How Black Is Too Black?" – Barack Obama & Ensemble
- "First Lady" – Michelle Obama
- "Change" – Barack & Michelle Obama
- "Drill Me Baby" – Sarah Palin
- "White House Love" – Barack & Michelle Obama
- "What Would Liam Neeson Do?" – Joe Biden, Hillary Clinton & Barack Obama
- "M.F.M." – Mitch McConnell, Barack Obama & Voice of the People
- "Obama Cares" – Company

Act II

- "Welcome Back To 44" – Voice of the People
- "Filibusters" – Mitch McConnell & Ted Cruz
- "No Matter What" – Barack & Michelle Obama
- "Oh, Herman Cain" – Herman Cain
- "We Got Bin Laden" – Barack & Michelle Obama & Company
- "Amazing Grace" – Voice of the People & Barack Obama
- "Remember Me" – Barack Obama
- "F.U.T.C." – Barack Obama, Joe Biden & Herman Cain
- "Get It Together" – Barack & Michelle Obama
- "M.F.O. (Reprise)" – Barack Obama & Voice of the People
- "Brother Abe Lincoln" – Brother Abe Lincoln, Barack Obama & Ulysses S. Grant
- "44 Is Back" – Company*

*As of 2025 off-Broadway run, as listed in program.

== Characters and casting ==
Character	World Premiere	Bourbon Room Second Run	Chicago	Los Angeles	Off-Broadway
Barack Obama	T.J. Wilkins	T.J. Wilkins	T.J. Wilkins	T.J. Wilkins	T.J. Wilkins
Michelle Obama	Shanice	Shanice	Shanice	Shanice	Shanice
Joe Biden	Chad Doreck	Chad Doreck	Chad Doreck	Chad Doreck	Chad Doreck
Mitch McConnell	Larry Cedar	Larry Cedar	Larry Cedar	Larry Cedar	Larry Cedar
Sarah Palin	Jane Papageorge	Jane Papageorge	Summer Collins	Summer Collins	Summer Collins
Voice of the People	Kitten Kuroi	Summer Nicole Greer	Summer Nicole Greer	Summer Nicole Greer	Summer Nicole Greer
Lindsey Graham / Coexist Lady	Jeff Sumner	Jeff Sumner	Jeff Sumner	Jeff Sumner	Jeff Sumner
Hillary Clinton	Kelley Dorney	Kelley Dorney	Kelley Dorney	Jenna Pastuszek	Jenna Pastuszek
Herman Cain	Dino Shorté	Dino Shorté	Dino Shorté	Dino Shorté	Dino Shorté
Ted Cruz	Michael Uribes	Michael Uribes	Michael Uribes	Michael Uribes	Michael Uribes
Brother Abe Lincoln	—	—	Marqell Edward Clatyon	Marqell Edward Clatyon	Jevon McFerrin
John Boehner	Kevin Bailey	Kevin Bailey	Kevin Bailey	—	—
Roger Ailes	Ted Barton	Ted Barton	—	—	—
