= Cody Lassen =

American theater producer and consultant

- Born: Kenosha, Wisconsin, U.S.
- Education: University of Notre Dame (MBA); DePaul University (BA)
- Occupations: Producer, Consultant
- Notable work: Revival of Spring Awakening
- Website: www.codylassen.com

Cody Lassen is an American Tony Award-winning and Grammy nominated theater producer and consultant. He is best known for producing the revival of Spring Awakening, which won him an Ovation Award and a Tony nomination.

== Career ==
Lassen was born in Kenosha, Wisconsin. He earned his MBA from the University of Notre Dame and graduated from DePaul University.

He held live entertainment management positions with Nielsen and NBCUniversal. While at NBCUniversal, Lassen was active in their corporate diversity initiatives and was part of the team that led the company to be named one of the best places to work for LGBT employees. In addition to producing his own projects, Lassen consulted for major studios, producers, theatres and agencies. He oversaw marketing efforts for Los Angeles' Center Theatre Group and was a production assistant for several films and TV series.

His Broadway productions include Indecent and revival of Spring Awakening and co-productions include Macbeth starring Alan Cumming, "Significant Other", The Band's Visit, and Torch Song.

When Lassen joined the production of the Deaf West Theatre revival of Spring Awakening in 2015, it premiered at Inner-City Arts' Rosenthal Theater in L.A. Under his production management, the show went on to win six Ovation Awards (with 15 nominations), including best musical in two categories, intimate theater and large theater. The latter was won by Lassen together with the Wallis Annenberg Center for the Performing Arts and Deaf West Theatre.

Lassen teamed up with producers Ken Davenport and the Deaf West Theatre, and transferred the show from the 99-seat Los Angeles production to Broadway in just 366 days, an unprecedented feat. The production opened at the Brooks Atkinson Theatre in September 2015. For the show, performed in both American Sign Language and spoken English, the producers were honored with the Champion of Change Award by the New York Mayor's Office for People with Disabilities for their "efforts to increase diversity and inclusivity on Broadway." The show was a success on Broadway and was even performed at the White House.

He partnered with Daryl Roth to transfer the critically acclaimed Paula Vogel play Indecent to Broadway in the 2016/17 season where it was honored with two Tony Awards for Best Direction and Best Lighting, and nominated for Best Play.

Lassen's upcoming projects include How I Learned To Drive, a Pulitzer-winning play by Paula Vogel opening on Broadway in 2021, with much of the original cast and creative team from its off-Broadway debut 23 years prior, Alice By Heart, a new musical by Duncan Sheik, Steven Sater and Jessie Nelson, premiering at MCC Theater in February 2019; and Some Lovers, a new musical by Burt Bacharach and Steven Sater opening at the Adirondacks Theatre Festival in June 2018.

== Other activities ==
Cody serves on the board of New York's Vineyard Theatre and is a member of The Broadway League, The Recording Academy, Academy of Television Arts & Sciences, the National Association of Musical Theatre and the Off-Broadway League.

He serves as vice-chair of the board of GLAAD, an LGBT advocacy organization.

== Private life ==
Lassen lives in New York.

== Productions ==
- 2013, Macbeth (Broadway)
- 2015, revival of Spring Awakening (Broadway)
- 2016, revival of Merrily We Roll Along (Los Angeles)
- 2016, Significant Other (Broadway)
- 2017, Indecent (Broadway)
- 2017, The Band's Visit (Broadway)
- 2018, Some Lovers (Regional)
- 2018, Torch Song (Broadway)
- 2019, Alice by Heart (Off-Broadway)
- 2019, Tootsie (Broadway)
- 2019, What the Constitution Means to Me (Broadway)
- 2019, The Flamingo Kid (Regional)
- 2020, Indecent (London)
- 2021, Thoughts of a Colored Man (Broadway)
- 2021, A Commercial Jingle for Regina Comet (Off-Broadway)
- 2022, How I Learned To Drive (Broadway)
- 2022, Hyprov (Off-Broadway)
- 2022, Picking Up Speed (Off-Broadway)
- 2024, The Notebook (musical) (Broadway)
- 2024, The Wiz (Broadway)
- 2024, Empire Records The Musical (Regional)
- 2024, Rutka (Regional)
- 2024, Maybe Happy Ending (Broadway)
- 2025, Othello (Broadway)
- 2026, Wanted (Broadway)
- 2027, Damn Yankees (Broadway)

== Recordings ==
- 2024, An Exploration of Hypnotic Sound, Co-Producer
- 2024, The Match (from Rutka: a new musical), Producer
- 2024, Picking Up Speed (World Premiere Recording), Producer
- 2022, A Commercial Jingle for Regina Comet (Original Off-Broadway Cast Recording), Producer
- 2021, Some Lovers (Concept Album), Producer
- 2019, Alice by Heart (musical) (Original Off-Broadway Cast Recording), Executive Producer
- 2017, Indecent (Original Broadway Cast Recording), Executive Producer

== Film and television ==
- 2025, Actual Nobodies (feature film), Producer
- 2023, Summoning Sylvia (feature film), Producer
- 2020, Indoor Boys (digital series), Executive Producer

== Awards and nominations ==
- 2015: winner of a Champion of Change Award for Spring Awakening

Year	Award	Category	Nominated work	Result	Ref.
2015	Ovation Award	Best Musical – Intimate Theatre	Spring Awakening	Won	
2015	Ovation Award	Best Musical – Large Theatre	Spring Awakening	Won	
2016	Drama Desk Award	Outstanding Revival of a Musical or Revue	Spring Awakening	Nominated	
2016	Tony Award	Best Revival of a Musical	Spring Awakening	Nominated	
2017	Drama Desk Award	Outstanding Musical or Revue	Indecent	Nominated	
2017	Tony Award	Best Play	Indecent	Nominated	
2018	Tony Award	Best Musical	The Band's Visit	Won	
2019	Tony Award	Best Play	What The Constitution Means To Me	Nominated	
2019	Drama Desk Award	Outstanding Play	What The Constitution Means To Me	Nominated	
2019	Tony Award	Best Revival of a Play	Torch Song	Nominated	
2019	Drama Desk Award	Outstanding Musical	Tootsie	Nominated	
2019	Tony Award	Best Musical	Tootsie	Nominated	
2021	Grammy Award	Grammy Award for Best Musical Theater Album	Burt Bacharach & Steven Sater's Some Lovers	Nominated	
2022	Drama Desk Award	Outstanding Play	How I Learned to Drive	Won	
2022	Tony Award	Best Revival of a Play	How I Learned to Drive	Nominated	
