= Ingrid Cole =

American actress

Ingrid Cole is an American actor with the American Musical Theatre.

== Career ==
In 2010 and 2012, she was honored with the Suzi Bass Award for Best Leading Actress in a Musical for A Catered Affair at the Aurora Theatre, and for her portrayal of Rose in Gypsy with the Atlanta Lyric Theatre. She has toured the U.S. extensively with Menopause The Musical.

Other credits include See What I Want to See (Suzi Bass Award for Best Ensemble and Atlanta Theatre Fan Winner), The Music Man, Grand Night for Singing, Call Me Madam, Ragtime, The Pirates of Penzance, Motherhood the Musical, The Mikado, A Funny Thing Happened on the Way to the Forum, and Nunsense with Dan Goggin.

Cole, from Asheville, North Carolina, is also a soloist at Peachtree Presbyterian Church in Atlanta and is a member of Actors' Equity Association. She also sings and volunteers with the Adult Choir of First Baptist Church, Asheville.
