= Menopause The Musical =

2001 musical from Jeanie Linders

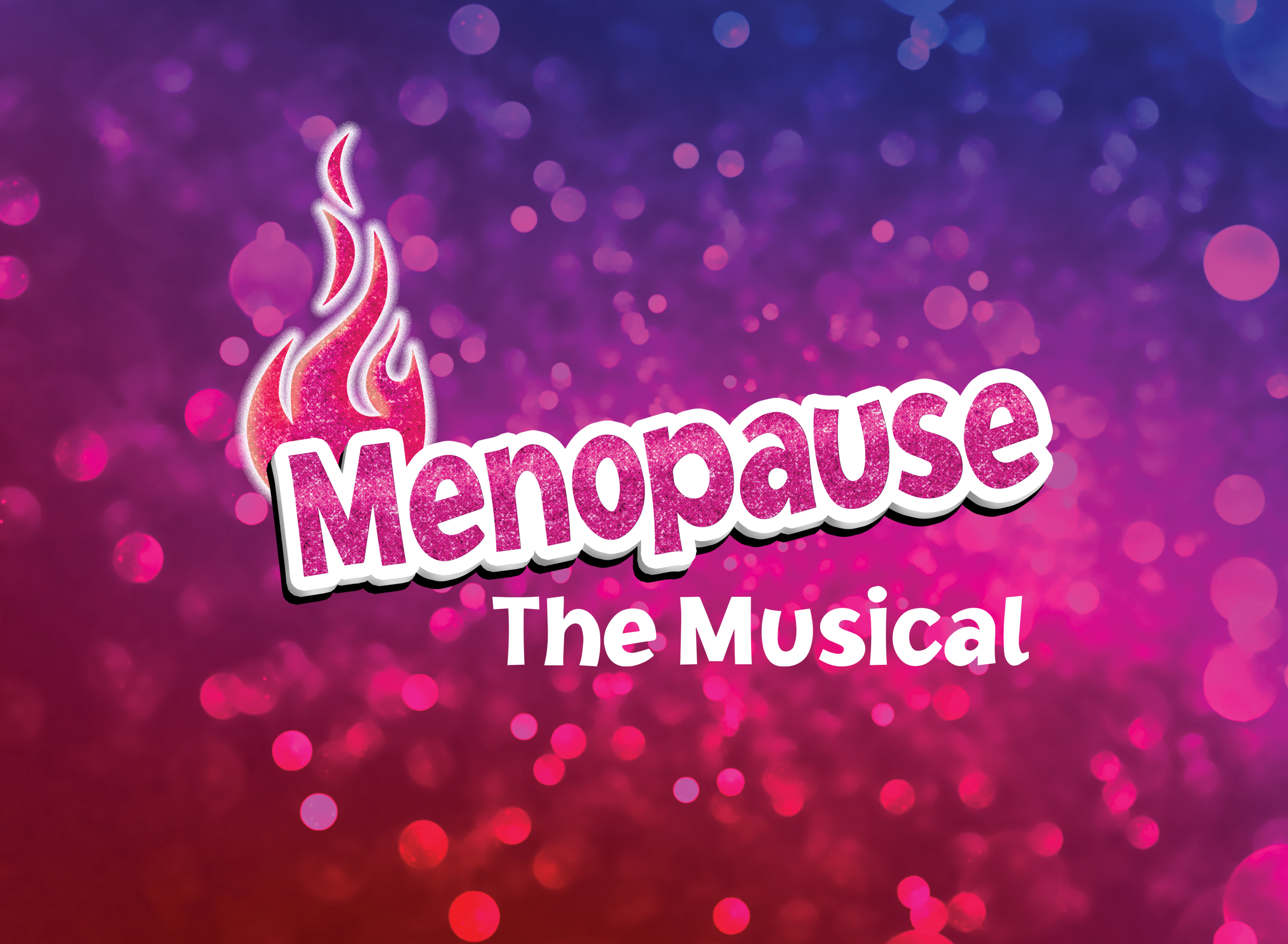
- Music: Various
- Lyrics: Jeanie Linders
- Book: Jeanie Linders
- Premiere: March 28, 2001: Orlando, Florida
- Productions: 2001 Orlando; 2002 Off-Broadway; 2006 United States tour (ongoing); 2006 Las Vegas (ongoing); 2006 Canada tour (ongoing); 2007 London; 2007 South Africa; 2007 Malaysia; 2015 United Kingdom & Ireland tour (ongoing); 2016 Australia & New Zealand tour (ongoing); 2016 Mexico; 2018 Spain; 2018 Slovenia; 2018 Brazil; 2019 South Korea; 2019 France (ongoing); 2019 Croatia; 2018 Hungary (ongoing); 2020 Finland (ongoing)

Menopause The Musical is a 2001 musical with book and lyrics by Jeanie Linders which premiered on March 28, 2001 in Orlando, Florida. The musical follows four mature women shopping for lingerie at a Bloomingdale's sale, with lyrics parodying popular music from the baby boomer era to reflect symptoms of menopause. Following the success of an Off-Broadway production, running for over 1,500 performances until 2006, the show was produced across the United States touring to the present day including in Las Vegas, where it has been running since 2006 as the longest running scripted musical in Las Vegas history. The show has spawned productions worldwide.

== Productions ==
=== Original Orlando production ===
The original Orlando production opened on March 28, 2001, at the Church Street Theatre building, that was specifically converted from a perfume shop into a 76-seat theatre for the show. Its original cast members were Shelly Browne as the Power Woman (later renamed the Professional Woman), Patti McGuire as the Iowa Housewife, Pammie O'Bannon as the Earth Mother, and Wesley Williams as the Soap Star. The show then transferred to West Palm Beach's Cuillo Center on June 22, 2001.

=== Original off-Broadway productions ===
The Off-Broadway production officially opened at Theatre Four on April 4, 2002, after a month of previews. It then transferred to Playhouse 91 in September of that year. After running for four years, the Off-Broadway production closed in May 2006.

=== North American productions ===
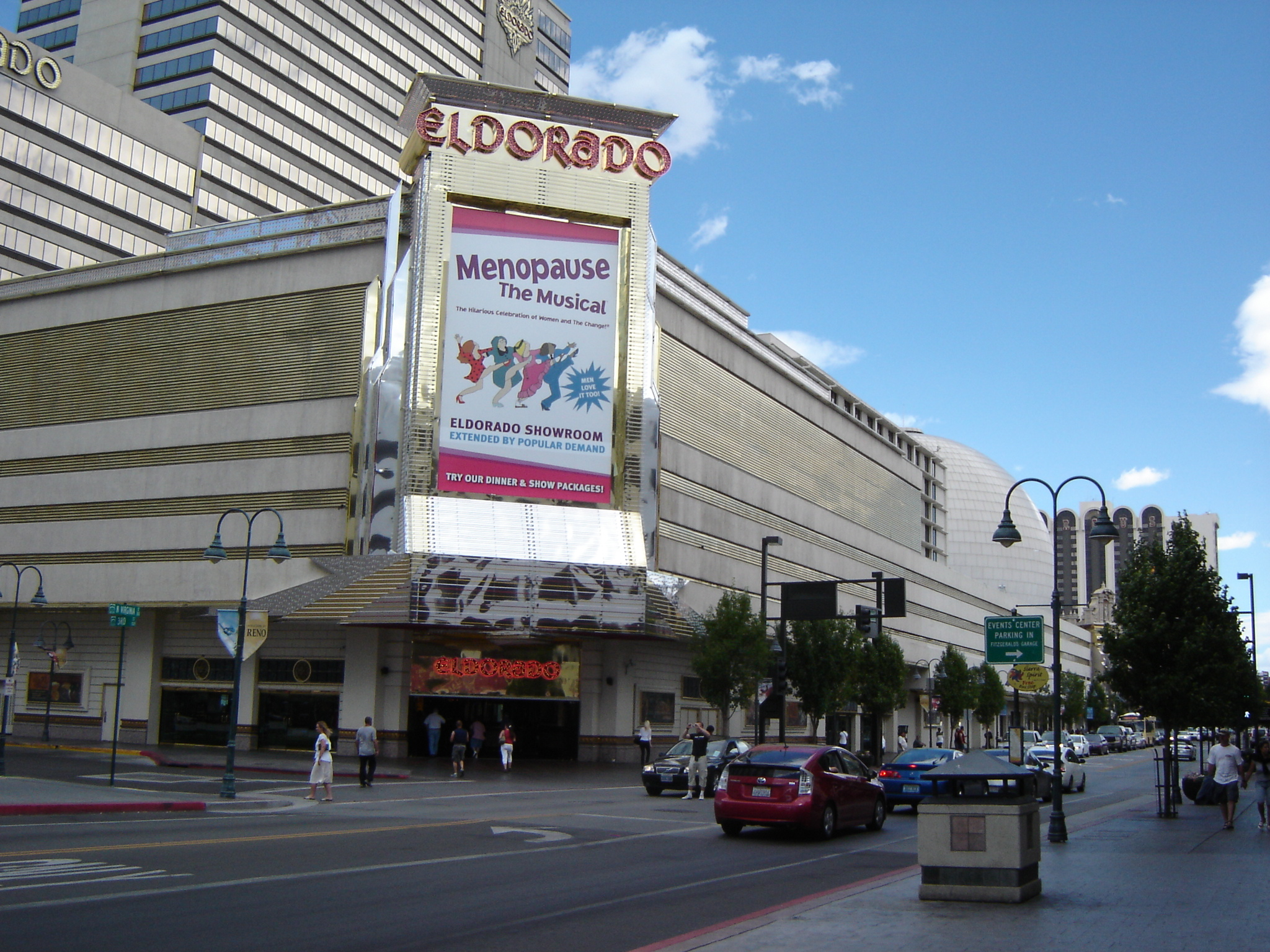
Menopause the Musical at the Eldorado Resort Casino in Reno, Nevada in 2009.

Alongside the New York and Florida runs, GFour Productions mounted further sit-down productions throughout the United States. These opened at the Apollo Theatre in Chicago on July 25, 2003, becoming the highest grossing musical in the theatre's history after 1,281 performances, the Coronet Theatre in Los Angeles on October 30, 2003, the Gem Theatre in Detroit on March 17, 2004, becoming the longest running show in Michigan's history and the Stuart Street Playhouse in Boston on March 31, 2004, running for 1,092 performances. Since 2006 American actress Ingrid Cole is a member of Menopause the Musical. The Las Vegas production has been running continuously since 2006, currently at Harrah's Las Vegas.

This was followed by a national tour that continues to run as of November 2021, reaching over 500 cities worldwide. A further American tour specifically to raise funds and awareness for the fight against ovarian cancer was later launched in 2015.

=== International productions ===
International productions have been staged all over the world. Local references in the show are customized to the location of the performance. For example, the 'Iowa Housewife' became 'Dubbo Housewife' in Australia; America's Bloomingdale's became Marks & Spencer in London.

== Original US production musical numbers ==
- "Change, Change, Change" (Aretha Franklin)- Professional Woman, Earth Mother & Girls
- "I Heard It Through the Grapevine" (Marvin Gaye) - Professional Woman & Soap Star
- "Sign of the Times" (Petula Clark) - Earth Mother & Iowa Housewife
- "Stayin' Awake/Night Sweatin'" (The Bee Gees) - Ensemble
- "My Husband Sleeps Tonight" (The Tokens) - Earth Mother & Girls
- "Hot Flash" (Martha and the Vandellas) - Soap Star
- "Drippin' and Droppin'" (Dusty Springfield) - Earth Mother
- "I'm Flashing" (Brenda Lee) - Professional Woman
- "The Great Pretender" (The Platters) - Professional Woman, Iowa Housewife & Girls
- "Sane and Normal Girls/Thank You Doctor" (The Beach Boys) - Ensemble
- "Lookin' for Food" (Johnny Lee) - Soap Star, Iowa Housewife & Girls
- "Please Make Me Over" (Dionne Warwick) - Soap Star

- "Beauty's Only Skin Deep" (The Temptations) - Ensemble
- "I'm Flashing (reprise)" (Brenda Lee) - Professional Woman
- "Puff, My God, I'm Draggin'" (Peter, Paul and Mary) - Earth Mother
- "The Fat Gram Song" (Cher) - Professional Woman & Girls
- "My Thighs" (Mary Wells) - Iowa Housewife & Girls
- "Don't Say Nothing Bad About My Body" (The Cookies) - Soap Star & Girls
- "I'm No Babe, Ma" (Sonny & Cher) - Ensemble
- "Good Vibrations" (The Beach Boys) - Earth Mother & Soap Star
- "What's Love Got To Do With It?" (Tina Turner) - Professional Woman & Girls
- "Only You" (The Platters) - Iowa Housewife & Girls
- "New Attitude" (Patti LaBelle) - Ensemble
- "This is Your Day" (Village People) - Ensemble

== Reception ==
The New York Times cited the lyrics as "awkward" but "inspired" and that it was "impossible not to laugh". The Los Angeles Times said the "supreme silliness" was "fresh, funny and simply terrific". The Daily Californian summarised that "Menopause's collection of great oldies, clever tongue-in-cheek lyrics and entertaining dance routines prevented me from making any I-Need-Air trips to the restroom."

== See also ==
- Menopause
