= Cold email =

Unsolicited email

A cold email is an unsolicited e-mail that is sent to a receiver without prior contact. It could also be defined as the email equivalent of cold calling. Cold emailing is a subset of email marketing and differs from transactional and warm emailing.

Cold email is a personalized, message targeted either at a specific individual, or at a group of individuals. Its aim is to enter into a business conversation with that company, rather than to promote a product or a service to the masses.

Cold email, according to its proponents, is not spam. Cold emailing is distinct from spam in that it aims to initiate a genuine conversation rather than deceive the recipient. However, if certain steps are not followed, it may be treated as spam by spam filters or reported by the recipients.

== Email deliverability ==
Email deliverability is the percentage of emails that got successfully delivered to the primary inbox, instead of getting blocked or classified as spam.

Email deliverability is not the same as email delivery. Email delivery is the percentage of emails that got successfully delivered to the recipient's email address, regardless of whether it is the main inbox or any other folder, including spam.

Email deliverability is especially important for cold email senders because their goal is to have their email delivered to the recipients' main inbox.
