= Daryl Roth Theatre =

Off-Broadway theater in Manhattan, New York

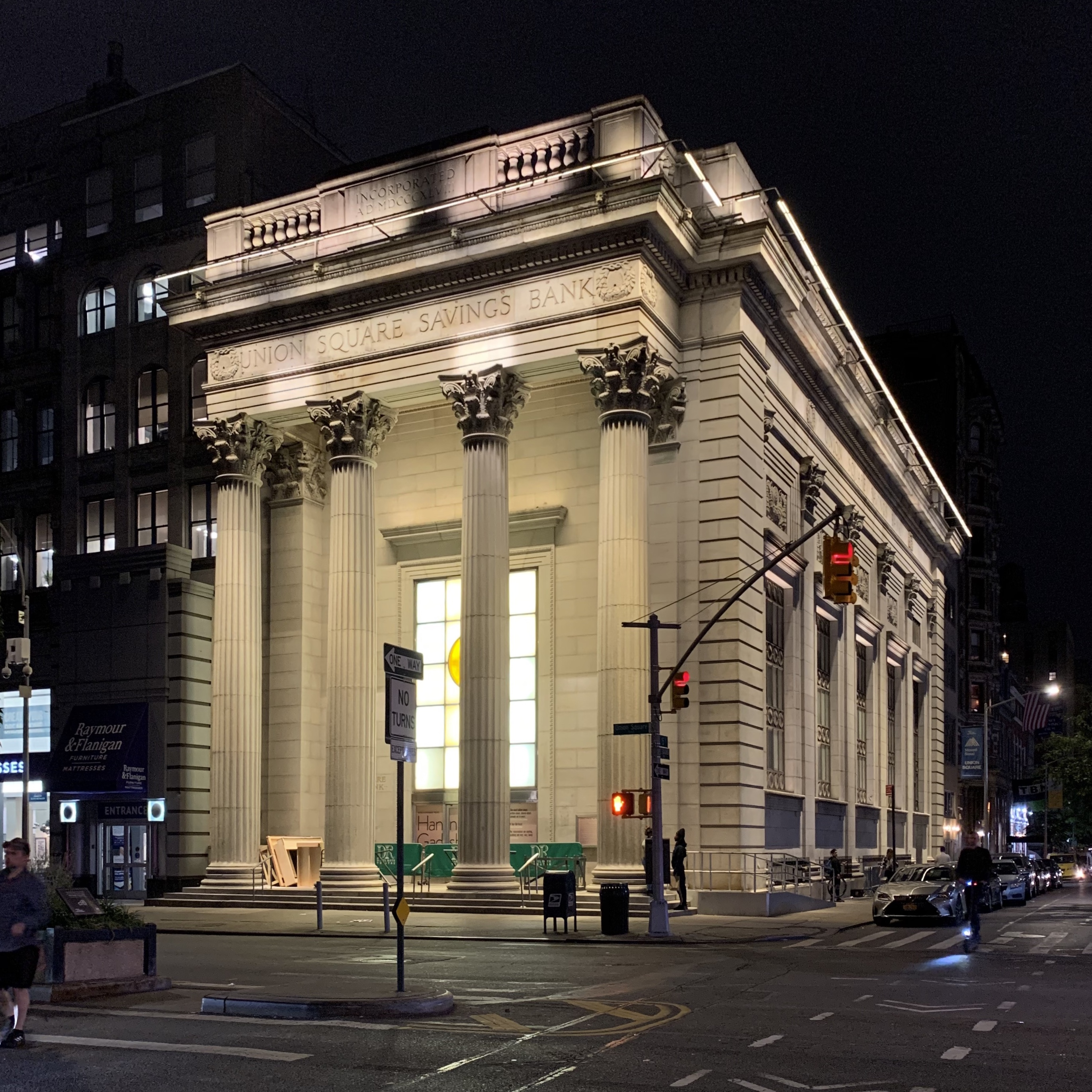
- Nighttime exterior view of the Union Square Savings Bank building, now the Daryl Roth Theatre
- Interactive map of Daryl Roth Theatre
- Address: 101 East 15th Street; Manhattan, New York City, U.S. United States
- Coordinates: 40°44′07″N 73°59′22″W
- Owner: Daryl Roth
- Capacity: Daryl Roth: 299–499; DR2: 99
- Type: Off-Broadway
- Current use: Titanique, All The Devils Are Here

Construction
- Architect: Henry Bacon

Website
- www.darylroththeatre.com

The Daryl Roth Theatre is an off-Broadway performance space at 101 East 15th Street, at the northeast corner of the intersection with Union Square East, near Union Square in Manhattan, New York City. The theater, which opened in 1998, is housed in the four-story Union Square Savings Bank building, which was designed by Henry Bacon and built between 1905 and 1907.

The original structure, a New York City landmark, houses a theater that can accommodate 300 seated or 499 standing patrons. The DR2 Theatre, located in an annex at 103 East 15th Street, seats 99.

== History ==
=== Bank building ===
The Union Square Savings Bank was founded in 1848 as the Institution for the Savings of Merchants' Clerks, which was originally located as 5 Beekman Street in Manhattan's Financial District and later relocated to 516 Broadway. In 1867, the institution bought a Greek Revival-style rowhouse at 20 Union Square East, on the northeast corner with 15th Street and adjacent to Union Square Park. The next year, the bank moved to the renovated rowhouse. Starting in the 1870s, the area surrounding the park became populated with hotels, theaters, and commercial enterprises. At the time, commercial banks in New York City were mostly located in converted structures, while savings banks were located in standalone, imposing buildings at the corners of intersections.

In 1895, the Institution acquired the adjacent 22 Union Square East to the north, and subsequently demolished both rowhouses at 20–22 Union Square East. The bank changed its name to the Union Square Savings Bank in 1904. The Union Square Savings Bank announced its intention to build a new structure on the combined site the same year, and hired Henry Bacon to draw up building plans. The initial plans published in the Real Estate Record in October 1905 depicted a 25-by-100-foot (7.6 by 30.5 m), two-story marble building costing $100,000. However, drawings published two months later in the Architecture magazine showed a slightly larger structure. The final plans were for a 52-by-125-foot (16 by 38 m) granite-faced building that cost $275,000. Construction began in May 1906 and the new bank opened on March 7, 1907.

The Union Square Savings Bank started opening branches in 1923, following the passage of a law that removed a ban on savings bank branches, but kept the original building as its headquarters. A penthouse was built in 1937, and a four-story office annex was built at 103 East 15th Street in 1955. The interior was renovated in 1961. The Union Square Savings Bank acquired Kings County Savings Bank in 1969 to form United Mutual Savings Bank. United Mutual failed in 1982 and was acquired by American Savings Bank. Upon the latter's insolvency in 1992, the Union Square branch was closed.

=== Theatre use ===
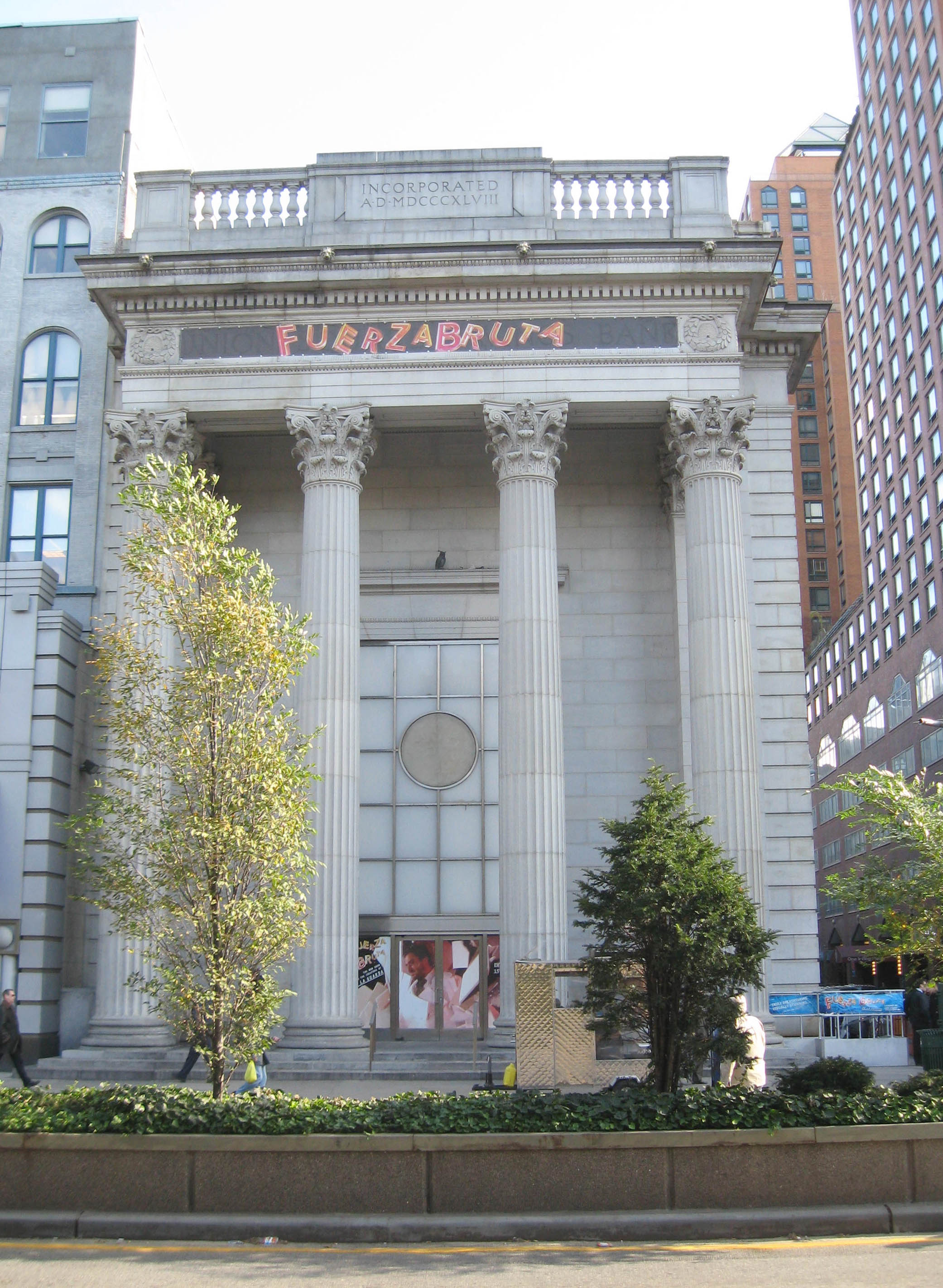
The theatre in 2008 during production of Fuerza Bruta; a sign with the show's name is visible in the entablature

In 1993, the House of Blues concert-venue company bought the bank and its annex at 103 East 15th Street for a combined $2.06 million. Isaac Tigrett, the House of Blues' founder, planned to open the venue with a live-music venue and 300-seat eatery in 1994. This drew concern among preservationists, who wanted the bank to be preserved in its original state, though Tigrett stated that he would not change the inside of the bank. The project was delayed, and by March 1995, construction was reported to be imminent. However, that June, the House of Blues withdrew its application for a liquor license, which would have enabled the restaurant to contain a bar. Manhattan Community Board 5, which covers Union Square, expressed concerns about the effects of a concert venue in the neighborhood, so the House of Blues agreed to delay construction in exchange for postponement of a public hearing.

In 1996, the building was acquired by Daryl Roth, who had devised plans to turn the bank into an off-Broadway venue. Upon the theater's opening in 1998, The New York Times described the bank building as one of a "growing number of unconventional spaces" that were converted into theaters. The 99-seat DR2 Theatre opened in 2002 within the former banking annex in 103 East 15th Street.

While Fuerza Bruta was in production at the theater from 2005 to 2016, the theater entrance was through a side door on the 15th Street side, while the main building entrance at Union Square was unused. In 2017, while making his theatrical directorial debut with In and Of Itself, Frank Oz changed the layout of the theater to incorporate its visually striking Union Square facade as an entrance to the theater. The renovations required moving the box office around, but upon the completion of work, the audience was able to enter through the front doors on Union Square East.

== Design ==
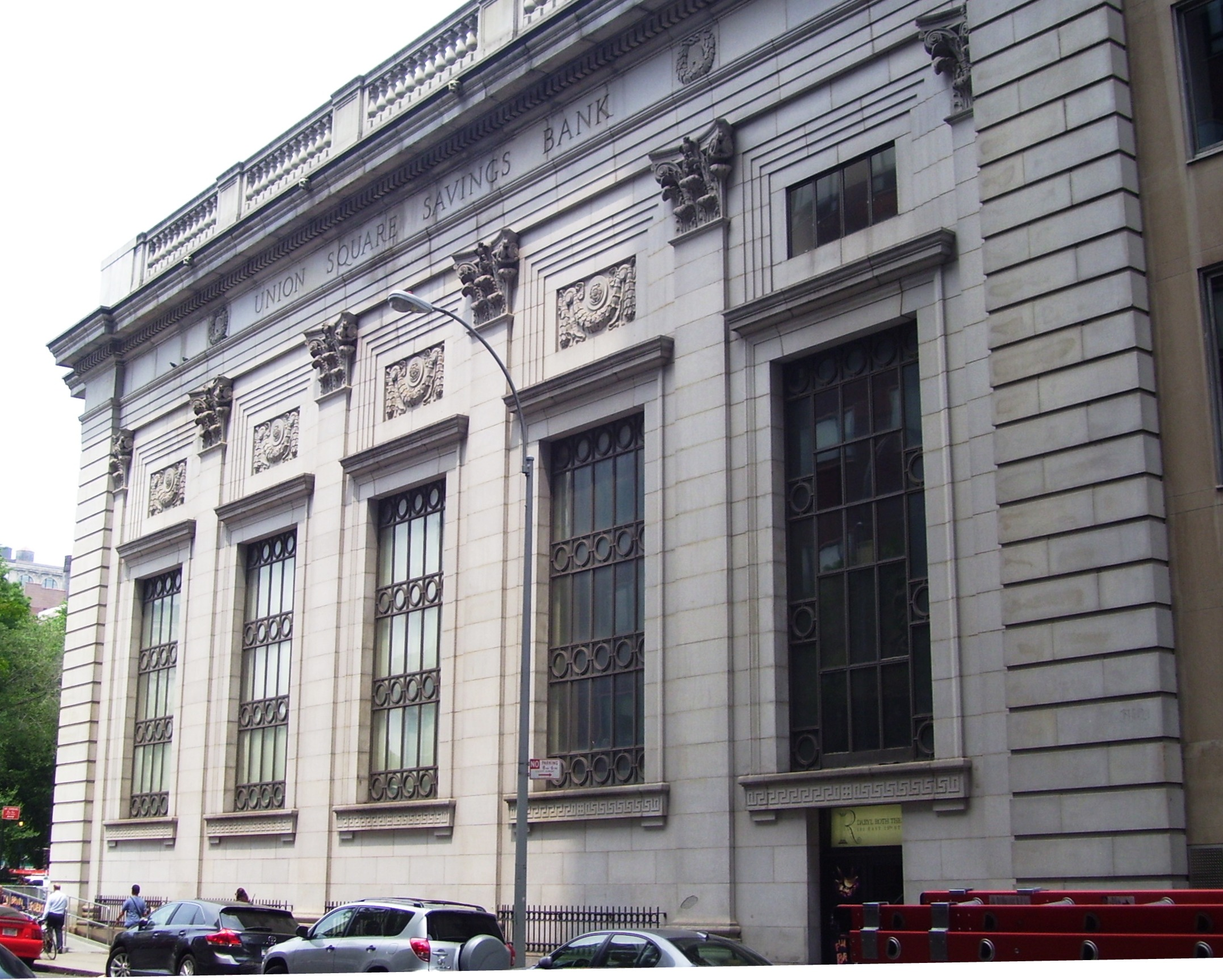
The theatre's 15th Street facade

The Daryl Roth Theatre is located on a lot measuring 52 feet (16 m) wide, along Union Square, and 125 feet (38 m) long on 15th Street. It is 60 feet (18 m) tall and contains four stories. When it served as a bank, the Daryl Roth Theatre building was among the many "monumental" bank buildings at street corners. The style was compared to temples in ancient Greece and Rome that had also served as banks. Bank architects, influenced by the World's Columbian Exposition in 1893, placed Renaissance and neoclassical features into banks such as the Daryl Roth Theatre building. The Daryl Roth Theatre building is located above a foundation of brick, with a concrete base, and contains a facade with white granite cladding. The interior structure is supported by walls and piers made of brick, while the upper floors are located on a structure of metal columns and girders.

=== Facade ===
The main facade is on the western side, facing Union Square. It contains a portico supported by four Corinthian columns, and below the portico, a small flight of steps leads up to the banking floor. An entablature and parapet run along the portico, and a cornice with various depictions of lentils, lions, and egg-and-dart motifs is located at the top of the portico. In the center of the facade, on the ground floor, is a tall vertical opening, which includes glass doors below an opaque-glass grid; this formerly led to the banking floor but now leads to the 300-seat main auditorium.

The southern facade of the main building, facing 15th Street, is divided into five vertical bays, each separated by pilasters topped by Corinthian-style capitals, Each of these bays contains large windows with bronze window bars. Carved panels are located above these windows, and a side entrance is located below the easternmost window.

Architectural features of the Daryl Roth Theatre

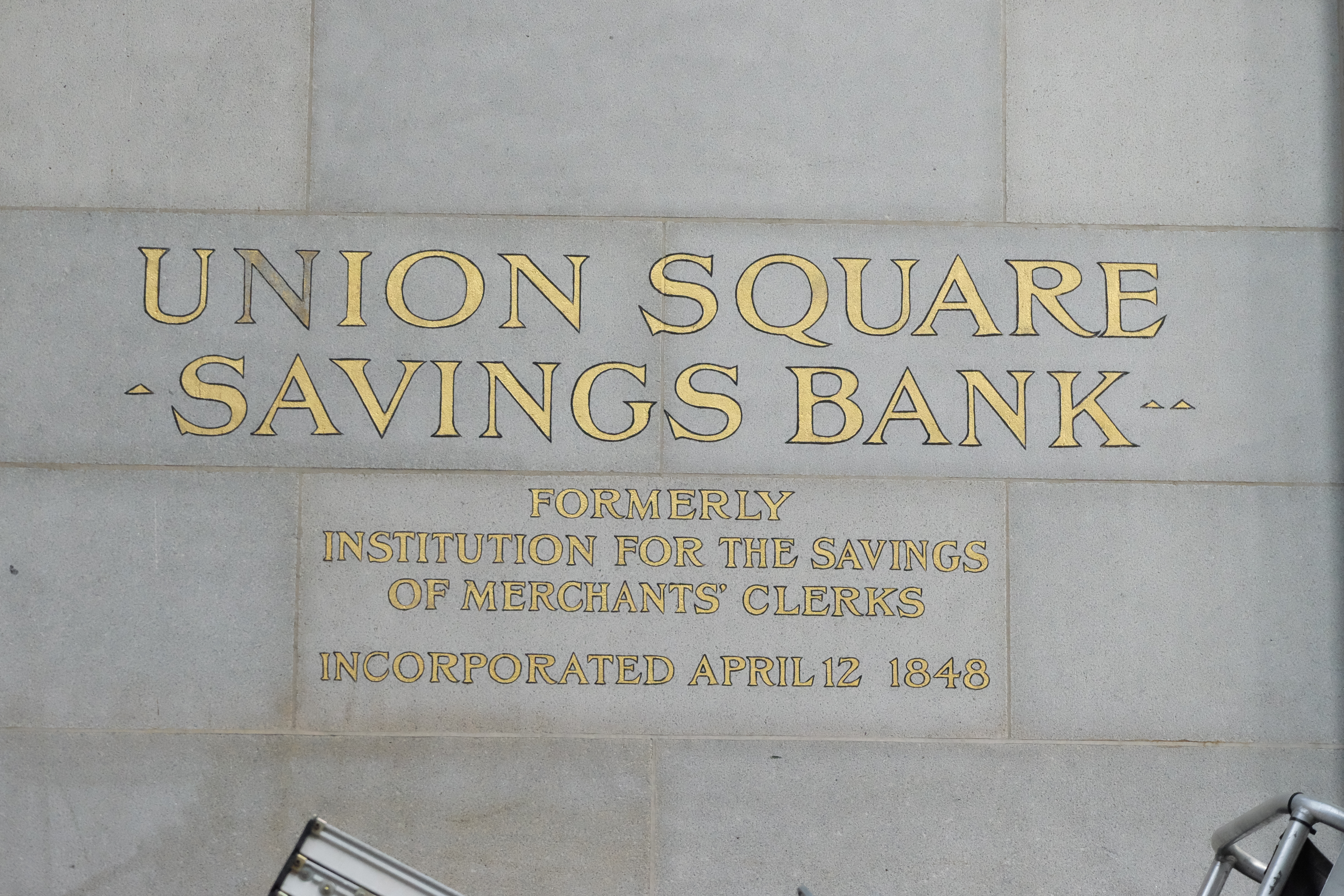
The gold sign at the front of the building

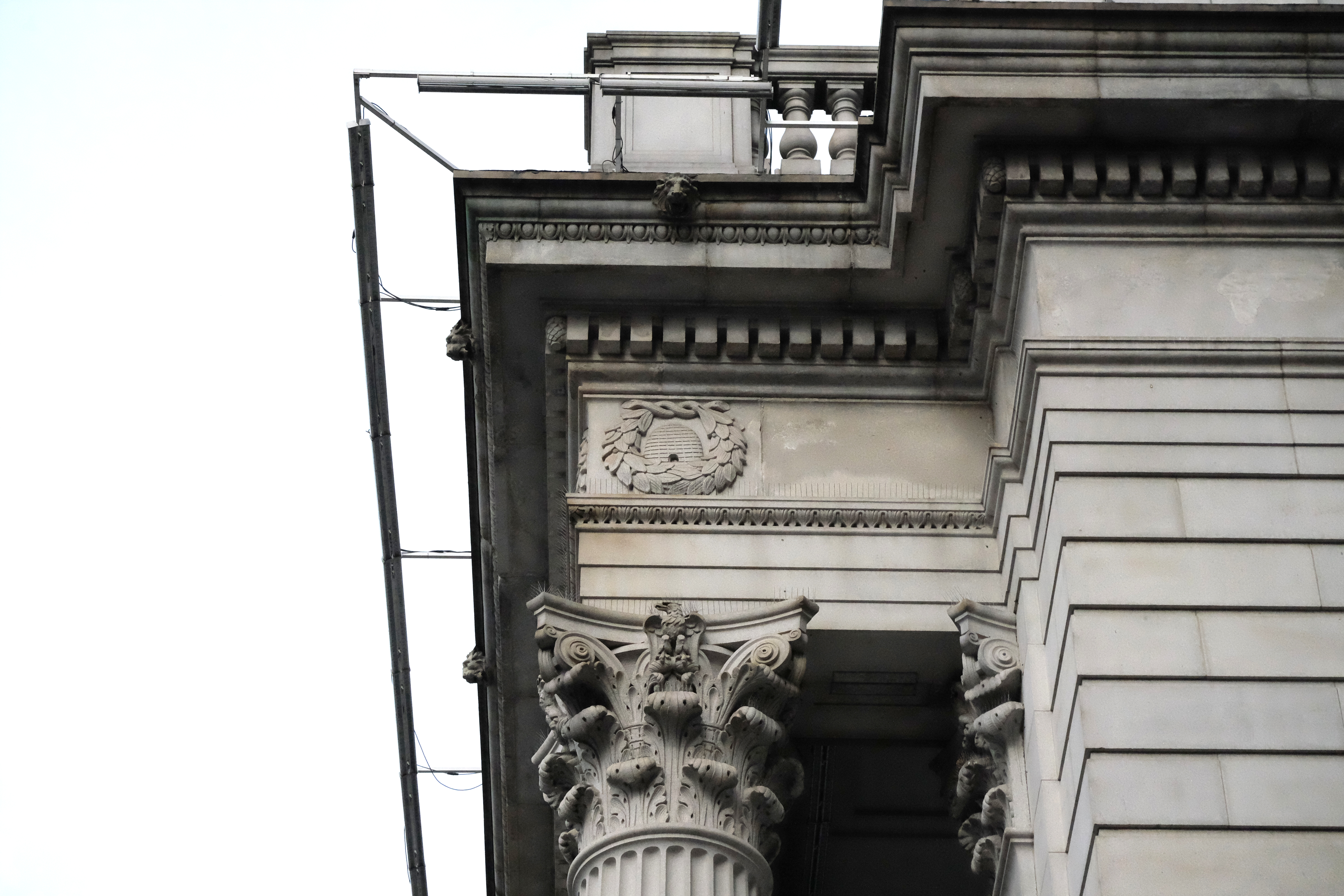
Detail showing the entablature

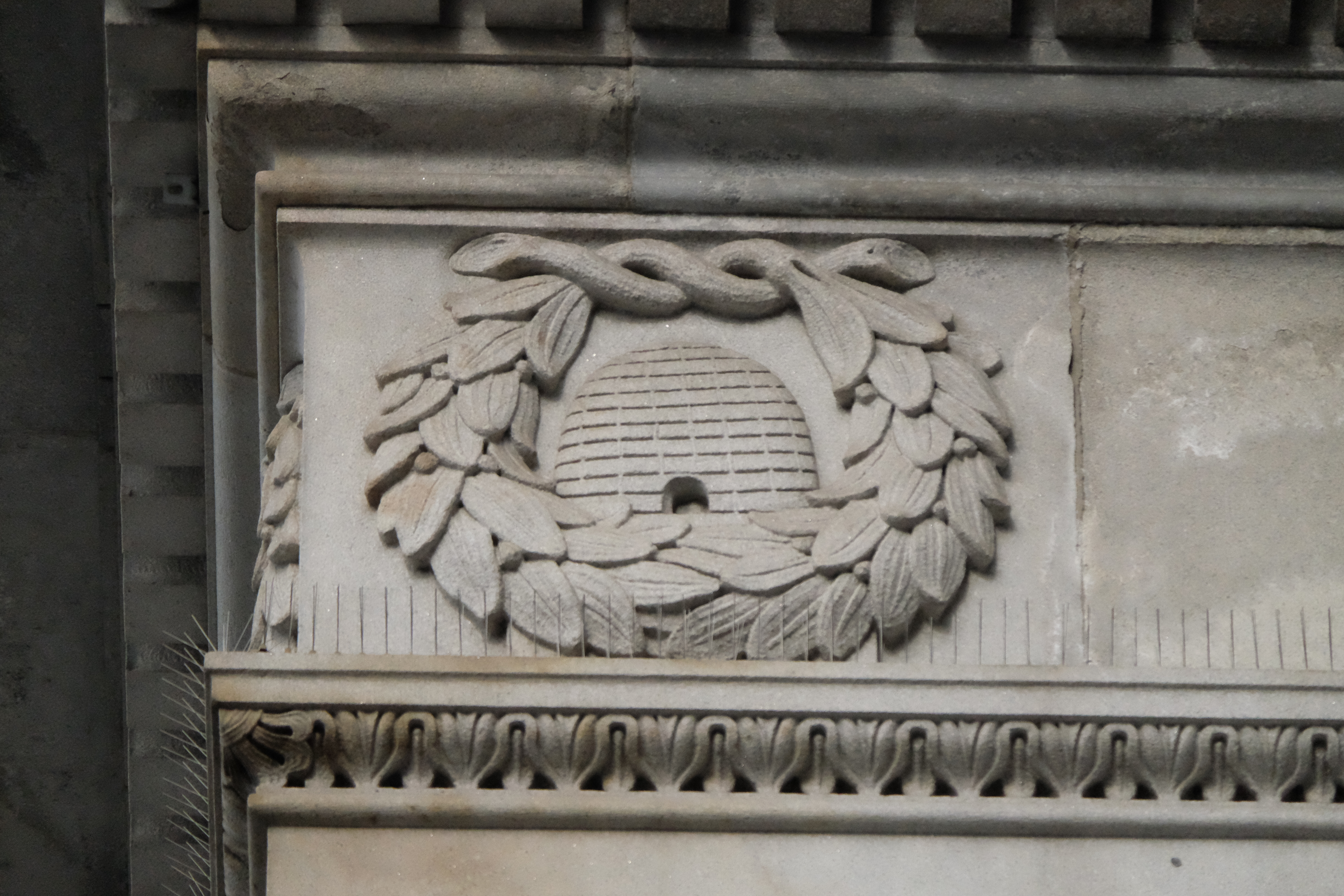
Detail of the beehive symbol on the frieze

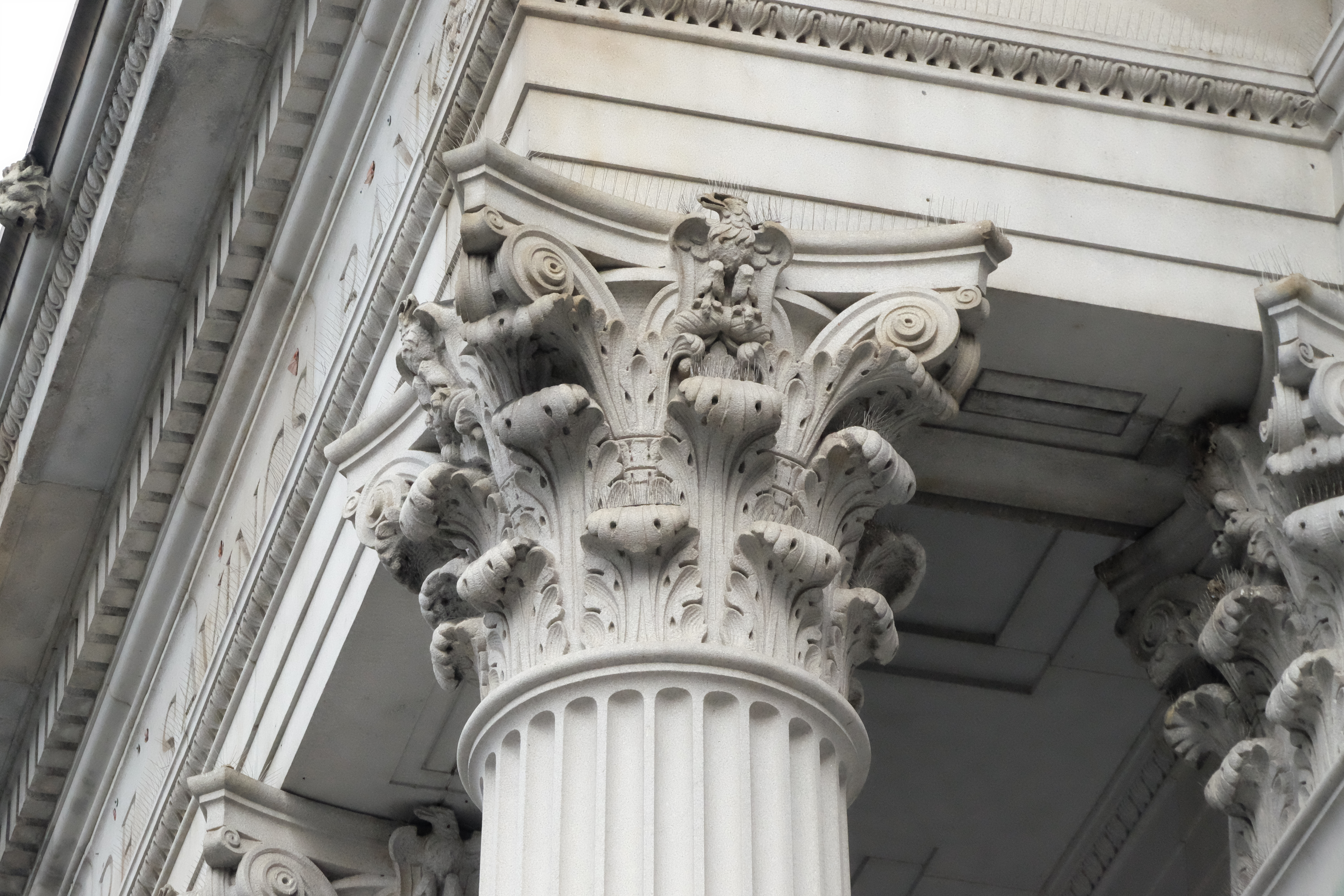
Detail of a column capital

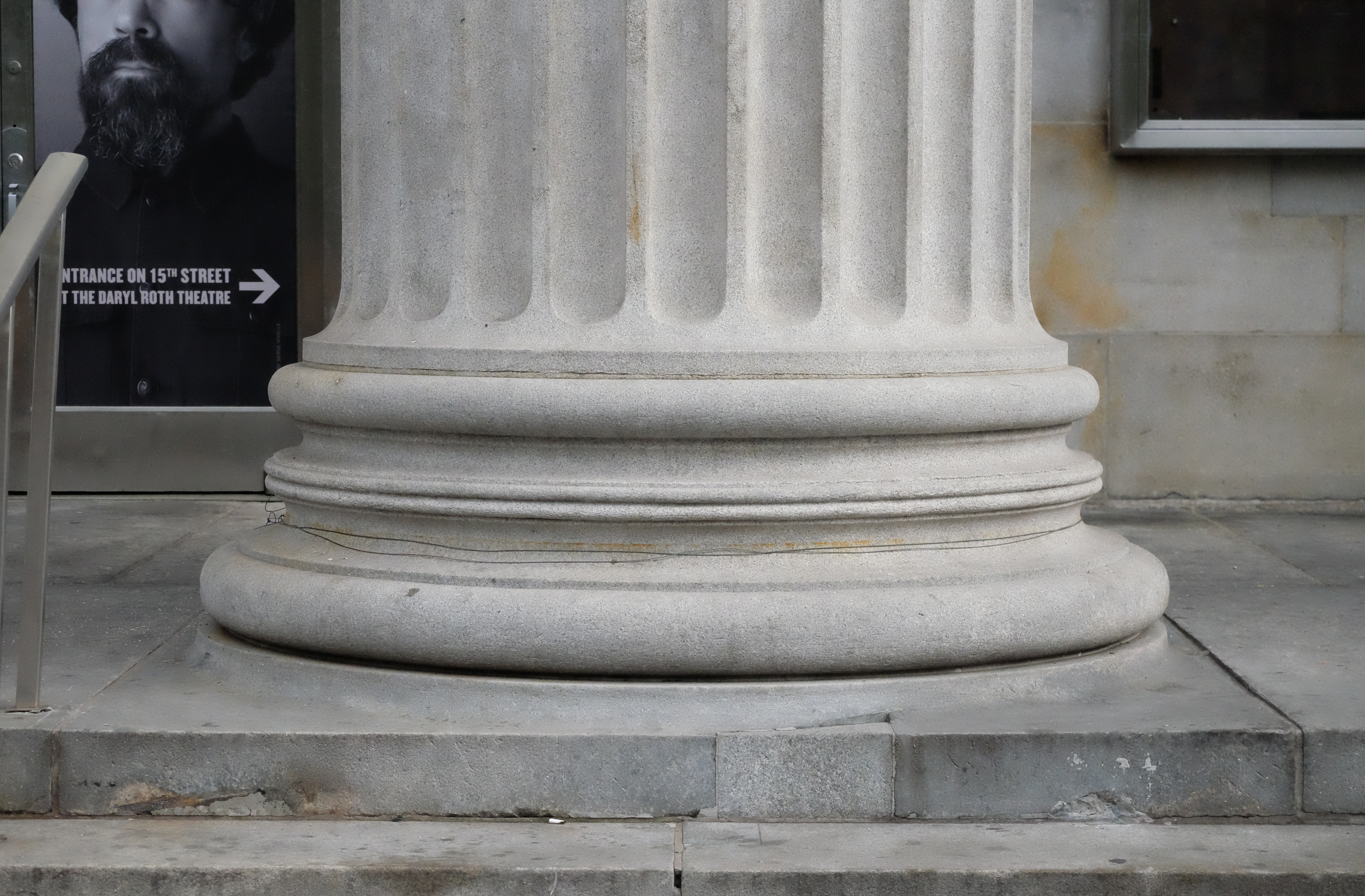
Detail of a column base

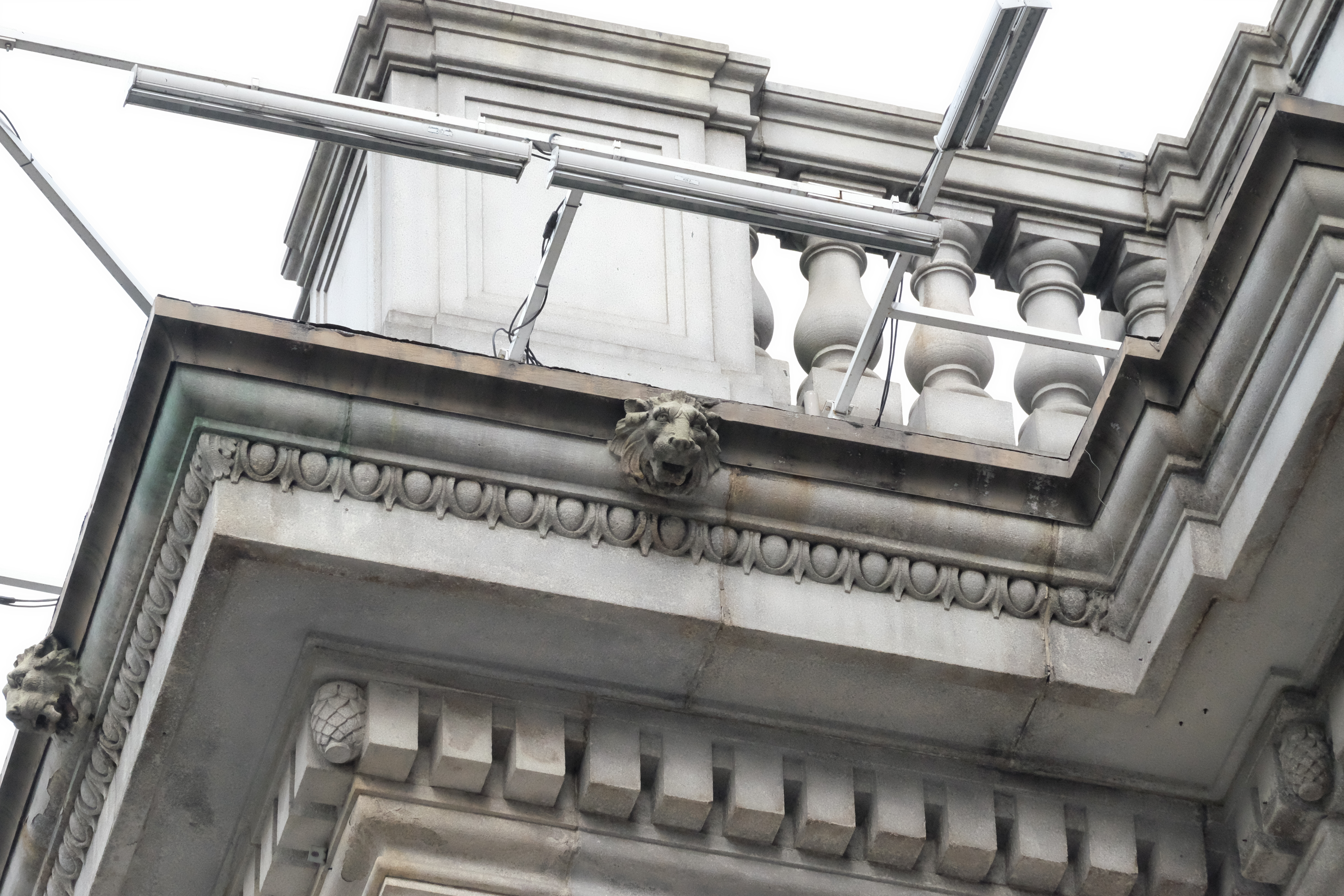
Detail of the cornice

== Productions ==
As of October 2019, the Daryl Roth Theater has hosted at least 33 productions. Fuerza Bruta was produced at the Daryl Roth Theatre from 2006 to 2016, while Striking 12 ran from November to December 2006. Gloria: A Life opened at the theater in October 2018 and closed in March 2019.

At the DR2 theater, Bunnicula ran between February and April 2013, while That Golden Girls Show ran from October 2016 to January 2017. Hyprov, a comedy show that mixed stage hypnosis and improvisation, ran for 70 performances at the theater between August and October 2022.

44: The Musical played a limited engagement at the Daryl Roth Theatre beginning October 14, 2025. In September 2026, Todrick Hall's new musical Midnight opened at the Daryl Roth, making is off-Broadway debut.
