= Neil Goldberg (artist) =

American artist (born 1963)

Neil Goldberg (born 1963) is an American video, photo and mixed media artist who lives and works in New York City. Goldberg was born in Long Island, New York, and received his BA in History and Computer Science from Brown University in 1985. His art career began in 1992, and he has since exhibited at The Museum of Modern Art, The New Museum of Contemporary Art, The Aldrich Contemporary Art Museum, NGBK Kunsthalle Berlin and El Centro de Cultura Contemporània. His work is in the permanent collection of the Museum of Modern Art. Goldberg's video Surfacing was featured on 15 screens in Times Square for the month of June 2013 as part of Midnight Moment, a program organized and supported by the Times Square Advertising Coalition in partnership with Times Square Arts, the public art program for the Times Square Alliance. Since 2013, Goldberg has been a critic at the Yale School of Art. He has also served as a visiting artist at Parsons/The New School, The School of Visual Arts, Cooper Union, New York University, and Temple University.

His work has earned him fellowships from the Guggenheim Foundation, the New York State Council of the Arts, the Lower Manhattan Cultural Council, the Harpo Foundation, Yaddo and the MacDowell Colony.

Goldberg's 2012 solo exhibition at the Museum of the City of New York was the first video art installation at that venue.

Randy Kennedy of the New York Times has called Goldberg's work "tender, moving and sad but also deeply funny." Time Out NY said "Goldberg has produced some of the most quietly intense and affecting art of his generation."
