= Theatre of NOTE =

Theatre company in Los Angeles

Theatre Of NOTE
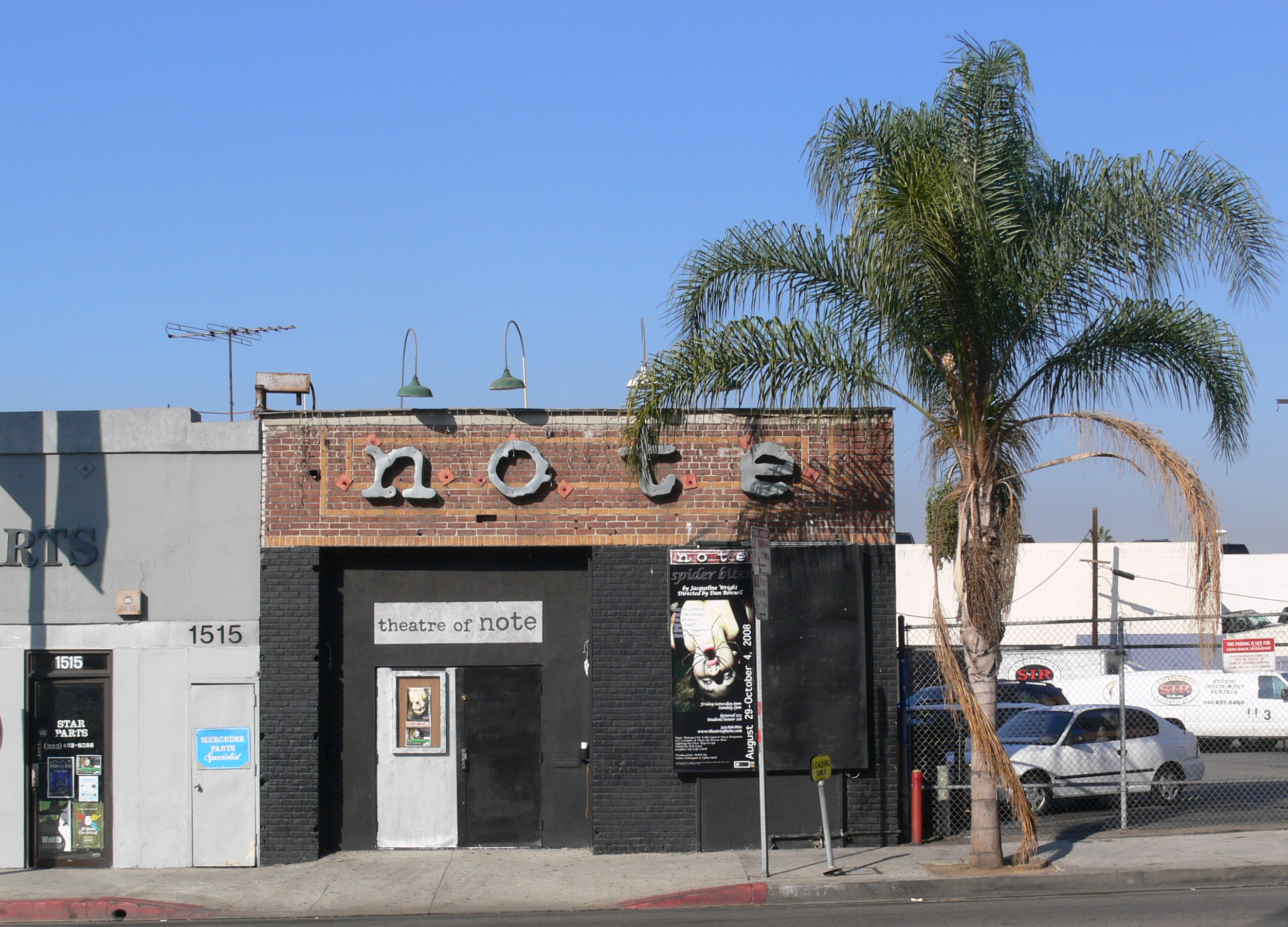
- Theatre Of NOTE
- Address: 1517 N. Cahuenga Blvd. Los Angeles, California; US
- Capacity: 44-99
- Type: Theatre Ensemble

Construction
- Opened: 1981
- Years active: 1981–present

Website
- www.theatreofnote.com

Theatre of NOTE is a theatre company situated in Los Angeles, California. Founded in 1981, the ensemble produces an average of four main stage productions per year, focusing on premieres from around the world, the West Coast, California, and Los Angeles. Notable premieres have been the world premiere of Bertolt Brecht's adaptation of The Duchess of Malfi, the Los Angeles premiere of Tony Kushner's A Bright Room Called Day, and Bill Robens' 2009 noir send-up Kill Me Deadly.

NOTE has earned commendations from the Los Angeles press and acclaim from national publications such as American Theatre magazine, as well as others.

== Early history ==
NOTE was founded in 1981 by Kevin Carr, along with Kitty Felde, Marc Gordon, Melanie MacQueen, Heather Carr, and Ted Parks, as a forum for original one-act plays (N.O.T.E. stood for "New One-Act Theatre Ensemble"), and to provide an environment for new playwrights. In 1982, following a season in the Attic Theatre, NOTE opened a black-box theatre in Downtown Los Angeles, where productions such as Dennis G. Turner's The White Pages and Kitty Felde's Man With No Shadow were performed. Shurtleff Twice Over, an evening of Michael Shurtleff one-acts, included the actress Anjelica Huston in a role. Extensive renovations to the space were carried out in 1985.

In 1986, Janis Hashe became artistic director. During her tenure, NOTE produced premieres of Christi Taylor-Jones's A Horse of a Different Color and Marc Mantell's Apartments. Leaving downtown in 1987, NOTE co-produced Dyeing and Other Comedies with Camelot Productions at the Skylight Theatre in Los Feliz. As part of the 1987 Los Angeles Fringe Festival, NOTE produced Roger Gillis's All Talk and Jeff Sheppard's 2000 Fish at the Powerhouse Theatre in Santa Monica. Also produced at the Powerhouse was DJ Carlile's Carved in the Fog. Ms. Hashe was elected to NOTE's board of directors in 1993. Joseph Megel became artistic director in 1988, and NOTE co-produced deaf performing artist and mime Peter Cook's The Flying Words Project with Friends and Artists Theatre (FATE) in Los Feliz. A number of other shows were also presented at FATE, including the premiere of Grubb Graebner's Arroyo Repo and also Cheryl Slean's Palmdale, developed at NOTE's Playwright's Workshop. In 1987, Walter Koenig directed his original one-act play The Secret Life of Lily Langtree, with his wife Judy Leavitt directing her two one-acts, #1 Tech Night: Hands on Demo and #3 Encore: Long Distance Lady, all under the umbrella title Public Moments.

In 1989, Doug Burch designed NOTE's theatre at 1705 N. Kenmore Avenue in Hollywood. In 1990, NOTE re-organized into an ensemble-managed company, electing a five-member Artistic and Management Boards. Early seasons in the Kenmore Avenue space included the productions of Paul Selig's Moon City, Leon Martell's Feed Them Dogs, Cheryl Slean's Swap Night, and John O'Keefe's Mimzibim! Jon Tolins premiered his play Man That Got Away and directed Grubb Graebner's Wanted before taking his Twilight of the Gold's to Broadway. NOTE received serious critical acclaim for its ‘91–92 season, garnering numerous Drama-Logue Awards and LA Weekly Theatre Awards and Award nominations.

== A New Direction ==
One of NOTE's most ambitious pieces was Ken Roht's 1997 musical adaptation and production of Aristophanes' The Birds. Diane Robinson filled the entire theatre with dirt for her direction of Macbeth. Two years later, in 2000, Theatre of N.O.T.E. established a policy change, reflected in the slight alteration made to company's name: dropping the periods so that the name read simply Theatre of NOTE, publicly asserting a change in focus from one-act to full-length plays. After an evening of one-acts by resident playwright Dennis Miles, presented under the banner title For The Curious, Theatre of NOTE offered four full-length productions: Bright Room Called Day, by Tony Kushner, Touch, by Toni Press-Coffman, the eccentric and wildly poetic Monstrosity, written & directed by Christopher Kelley, and a fully orchestrated musical presentation of Peter Weiss' Marat/Sade, directed by Brad Mays, with a completely restored verse text. From there, Theatre of NOTE began offering a mix of original and classical material, all with an eye for the untried and unusual. Shakespeare's Richard III and Moliere's The Learned Ladies were scheduled in between such pieces as Clyt At Home, Fucking Wasps, Just Say No, and Fuckjoy.

In 2003 Theatre of NOTE produced the Steve Morgan Haskell play titled Fucking Wasps which followed Kinsey's life from childhood until death. Matt Sesow's paintings adorned the theatre along with David Bickford playing piano live. Written and directed by Steve Morgan Haskell, Fucking Wasps received many accolades, including a Playwriting of the Year nomination from Backstage West.

On November 22, 2002, Theatre of NOTE offered its inaugural presentation of the satirical holiday musical A Mulholland Christmas Carol, with book, music and lyrics by Bill Robens, under the direction of Kiff Scholl. The production garnered positive reviews, and became the most financially successful production in the theatre's history (2000's production of Marat/Sade being the previous record-holder). For the next three years NOTE remounted the production, which continued to draw huge and enthusiastic audiences. In 2006 – and again in 2008 – the company collaborated with Sacred Fools Theater Company, moving the show into a larger space. In 2012, the musical performed at NOTE again for its 10th anniversary production.

== Young Writer's Project ==
The Young Writer's Project is a six-year-old artistic community outreach project produced for Theatre of NOTE by Jonathan Klein. Each year four high schools are chosen to participate in a workshop-based writing experiment that culminates in the staged production of four short plays, one play representing each school.

== PSC ==
The Production Selection Committee is open to all Theatre of NOTE members. NOTE accepts solicited and unsolicited scripts all year round. Each submitted play is read and receives coverage; chosen plays go on to a voiced reading at a PSC meeting. All plays are discussed and reviewed, and those with a simple majority of support go on to either NOTEworthy (their development workshop where they work with the playwrights) or NOTEwood.

== NOTEworthy ==
NOTEworthy is Theatre of NOTE's staged reading series, established to foster relationships with playwrights as they develop new works. Playwrights chosen for this series are expected to attend a staged reading of their works-in-progress, read by Theatre of Note members, and participate in feedback with the cast and audience, giving the playwrights opportunities to make revisions based on this feedback.

== NOTEwood ==
NOTEwood is the annual staged reading series of new plays held at Theatre of NOTE. NOTEwood is the touchstone used by the company in picking its season. All readings are curated by NOTE members, and feature actors from Theatre of NOTE ensemble. The readings are free and open to the public.
