= ARK Theatre Company =

Repertory theatre ensemble in Los Angeles

- Address: 5708 Lankershim Boulevard; North Hollywood, California; United States
- Capacity: 99
- Type: Actor-driven theatre ensemble

Construction
- Opened: 2000
- Years active: 2000 - present

Website
- arktheatrecompany.org/ (Archived) arktheatre.org/ (Archived)

ARK Theatre Company is an actor-driven repertory theatre ensemble in North Hollywood, California.

The original location of the ARK Theatre Company was at the Hayworth Theatre at 2511 Wilshire Boulevard, Los Angeles, California.

Years later the theatre moved to 5708 Lankershim Boulevard in North Hollywood, California.

== General ==
Ark Theatre Company is an ensemble of theatre professionals specializing in classical theatre, with an eye to contemporary plays that reflect the depth and interplay of language in classical works. The company was founded in 2000 by artistic director Paul Wagar, a former member of the Royal Shakespeare Company.

The Honorary Advisory Board of Directors once consisted of Marshall Borden, Kitty Felde, Doug Jocelyn, Patricia Johnson, Lee Meriwether, Karen Morrow, Lisa Rosen, Michael Rosen, Jennifer Rowland, Martin Sheen, Mindy Steinman, and Gore Vidal.

Ark Theatre Company was cited by LA Weekly and wrote that it "performs classics with a rock & roll sloppiness; equal parts aggravating and scintillating, always worth watching."

== Production history ==
Ark Theatre Company has, since its inception, produced a wide variety of material, from Edward II by Christopher Marlowe to Charles Ludlam's The Mystery of Irma Vep. The Ugly Man by Brad Frazier, The Maids by Jean Genet, and F*cking Hollywood, adapted from Arthur Schnitzler's La Ronde by Paul Wagar, are all testament to the company's intrinsic eclecticism.

Ark Theatre's controversial 2003 production of Anthony Burgess' A Clockwork Orange, directed by Brad Mays, was nominated for three LA Weekly Theatre Awards, for Best Direction, Best Revival Production (of a 20th-century work), and Best Actress. Vanessa Claire Smith won Best Actress for her gender-bending portrayal of Alex, the story's music-loving teenaged sociopath. Richard Tatum was likewise nominated for an LA Weekly Theatre Award for his performance in Ibsen's A Doll's House.

Other representative productions include director Richard Tatum's staging of The Country Wife by William Wycherley for which Tatum received an LA Weekly Theatre Award nomination for Best Adaptation; Richard Tatum's staging of On the Verge by Eric Overmeyer; Steven Shields' production of William Shakespeare's The Tempest; Return to the Forbidden Planet, directed by Vanessa Claire Smith; Les Miller's staging of Ibsen's Hedda Gabler; Lloyd's Prayer by Kevin Kling and Christopher Durang's Sister Mary Ignatius Explains It All For You, both directed by Susan Lee Johnson; and Caryl Churchill's sexual fantasmagoria Cloud 9, and a reconceptualization of William Shakespeare's The Merchant of Venice, both directed by Paul Wagar.
