= Bill Robens =

American dramatist

- Born: United States
- Other name: William Robens
- Occupations: Playwright, writer, actor, composer, guitarist

Bill Robens is a Los Angeles–based playwright, screenwriter and actor, whose written works include The Poseidon Adventure: the Musical (co-written with Genemichael Barrera), The Towering Inferno: the Musical (co-written with Steve Marca), a comedy variety show, A Fish Without His Flippers and A Mulholland Christmas Carol, which earned Bill an L.A. Weekly Theatre Award for Best Adaptation.

== Career ==
Bill Robens began writing for the theatre shortly after becoming a member of Theatre of NOTE, a Los Angeles theatre company specializing in new plays. His first satirical piece, The Poseidon Adventure: the Musical (co-written with Genemichael Barrera), was independently produced, drawing large crowds and excellent reviews. Robens then wrote a holiday play, A Mulholland Christmas Carol, which was performed at Theatre of NOTE with great success during the Christmas season of 2002, ultimately becoming an annual holiday event. The Towering Inferno: the Musical (co-written with Steve Marca), and the comedy variety show A Fish Without His Flippers soon followed.

Bill Robens' critically acclaimed gumshoe satire Kill Me Deadly played to packed houses for the entirety of its thrice-extended 2009 inaugural run at Theatre of NOTE.

In 2009, Bill Roben's first feature film as a writer, Scream of the Bikini, directed by long-time collaborator Kiff Scholl, began playing the festival circuit.

In 2015, he adapted Kill Me, Deadly into a feature film of the same name.
