= Jaime Andrews =

American actress (born 1976)

- Born: Jaime Allison Andrews; October 21, 1976 (age 49); Long Island, New York, U.S.
- Occupations: Actress, producer, business director, playwright
- Years active: 1994–present
- Spouse: Curt Bonnem (m. 2020)
- Website: www.jaimeandrews.com

Jaime Allison Andrews (born October 21, 1976) is an American actress, producer, business director and playwright who is known for her comedic commentary on the cable television series World's Dumbest... She has appeared in a number of television commercials over the years and was cast as Dottie in the Amazon Prime series Good Girls Revolt.

== Early life and career ==
A native of Long Island, Andrews first began performing in local children's shows. She appeared in her first television pilot in 2001 as part of a comedy reality series on The Nashville Network (later Spike) called Crash Test. It aired two episodes in 2004, but the program was quickly canceled.

Andrews performed regularly in live theater throughout the New York City area before moving west to Los Angeles in 2005.

After her arrival in California, Andrews became a longstanding member of Sacred Fools Theater Company. She has been part of many main-stage productions, including Goose & Tomtom, Claire Z, La Bête, The Swine Show, Forbidden Zone: Live in the 6th Dimension, Fast & Loose, Serial Killers and Absolutely Filthy (An Unauthorized Peanuts Parody).

She produced the shows The Gas House and Baal in 2007 and 2010, respectively, as well as writing and leading in Cookie & the Monster in 2015. The production won Best in Ensemble Theatre at the Hollywood Fringe Festival. Andrews has also served Sacred Fools as a business manager, 13th Season Artistic Committee member (2009-2010), and for three years as managing director. She continues to perform at theaters in her native New York from time to time.

Andrews modeled with Jamisin Matthews as the demolition couple on the DVD cover Life on the Murder Scene by rock band My Chemical Romance, which was released in 2006. She has provided comedic commentary in truTV Presents: World's Dumbest... from 2008 through 2013.

Andrews has also appeared on two episodes of Penn & Teller: Bullshit! in 2008 and 2009, as well as playing the role of Betty Bobbins in the original series of Baby Geniuses. This was released on video between 2013 and 2015. She was cast as Dottie in the Amazon Prime series Good Girls Revolt, which first aired on October 28, 2016.

The show was canceled on December 2, 2016, after one season.

Andrews played the leading role of Andi James in a 2022 drama film called Division, which she wrote. It also stars her husband, Curt Bonnem, as well as Joshua Payne.

== Personal life ==
Andrews is married to actor and director Curt Bonnem, who was cast as Brad King in the YouTube and Hulu web television series Old Dogs & New Tricks. Bonnem appeared on an episode of Criminal Minds in 2007. He was also a member of Sacred Fools Theater Company. Andrews and Bonnem were married in June 2020. The two currently reside in Atlanta, Georgia.

== Filmography and theatrical roles ==
Film
Year	Title	Role(s)	Notes
1999	Let's Meet Johnny		Short Film
2001	Pass the Buck		Short Film
2001	What a Man Wouldn't Do for a Woman		
2001	Sqrat		Short Film
2002	City in my Pocket		Short Film
2002	Fee, Alabama		Short Film
2002	It's a Haunted Happenin'!	Zera	
2005	Photosynthesis	Young Margerie	Short Film
2005	All Features Great and Small	Brandy Peters	Short Film
2007	Paralegal	Rachel	Short Film
2007	Universal Remote		Short Film
2007	Making a Killing	Celia	Short Film
2007	Wretched	Jenny	Short Film
2007	The Ultimate Ceremony		Short Film
2009	Scream of the Bikini		
2009	Nothing for Something	Janine	Short Film
2010	Coffee		Short Film
2010	Bold Native	Agent Burke	
2013	Baby Geniuses and the Mystery of the Crown Jewels	Betty Bobbins	
2014	Severe F**cking Drought	Jaime	Short Film
2014	Baby Geniuses and the Treasures of Egypt	Betty Bobbins	
2015	Baby Geniuses and the Space Baby	Betty Bobbins	
2020	Greenland	Mother on Plane	Supporting Role
2022	Samaritan	News Reporter	Supporting Role
2022	Division	Andi James	Written by Andrews

Television
Year	Title	Role(s)	Notes
2003	AMC Interstitials	Herself	AMC/Rainbow Media
2004	Crash Test	Herself	The Nashville Network/Spike
2004	Best Week Ever	Herself/Guest Star	VH1
2005	How to Be... [Pilot]	Herself	We TV
2007	Not Penn Jillette [Pilot]	Herself/Guest Star	Showtime
2008	Penn & Teller: Bullshit! -- "Being Green"	Herself/Field Interviewer	Showtime
2008	UFO [Pilot]	Herself	Meetinghouse Productions
2008	Expedition Danger [Pilot]	Herself	Meetinghouse Productions
2008-2013	World's Dumbest...—78 Episodes	Herself	truTV
2009	Penn & Teller: Bullshit! -- "Organic Food"	Herself/Field Interviewer	Showtime
2013	Crash & Bernstein -- "Crash Asks Too Many Questions"	Cassie	Disney XD
2016	Good Girls Revolt—Episodes 4-10	Dottie	Amazon Prime
2017	20 Seconds To Live -- "Medium"	Margaret	YouTube
2020	The Oval -- "The Loving Parents"	Kate Yarasloy	BET
2022	Legacies -- "Was This the Monster You Saw?"	Nurse	The CW

Theater
Year	Title	Role(s)	Notes
2000	The Sexual Politics of Blue Jays Wearing Little Plastic Pants	Jams/Improvisational	
2001	Finding Gräfenberg	Jams/Improvisational	
2002	Spurn	Various Parts/Sketch	
2005	Goose & Tomtom	Lorraine	
2006	Claire Z	Mrs. Schill/Ensemble	
2006	La Bête	Catherine DeBrie	
2006-2009	Serial Killers	Various Parts/Sketch	Seasons 1-5
2007	The Swine Show	Ensemble	
2007	The Gas House	Adria	Produced by Andrews
2007-2008	Tom, Dick & Harry	Katerina	
2007–2009, 2012	Magnum Opus Theatre -- "Abi's Choice"	Abi	
2008	Magnum Opus Theatre -- "What's Love Made Of, Anyway?"	Leila	
2008-2009	Fast & Loose	Mare/Ensemble	
2009	Tartuffe	Dorine	
2009	End of Civilization	Lily	
2010	Baal	Emily/LaSoubrette	Produced by Andrews
2010-2011	Forbidden Zone: Live in the 6th Dimension	Ex-Queen/Ensemble	
2012	Wheel of Misfortune	Herself	Written by Andrews
2013-2014	Absolutely Filthy (An Unauthorized Peanuts Parody)	Marcie	
2015	Cookie & the Monster	Cookie	Written by Andrews
2016	Serial Killers -- "Lord Wolfbane's Mistress"	Clarissaton Flumpenflumpf	Season 11
2017	The Sirens of Titan	Beatrice Rumfoord	
2017	Night Witches	Yevdokia "Yev" Bershanskaya	

Other theatrical performances done by Andrews, primarily in New York:

- The Real Thing as Debbie
- The Sisters Rosensweig as Tess Goode
- Fifteen Minutes as Linda
- Fefu & Her Friends as Cindy
- subUrbia as Erica
- 'Tis Pity She's a Whore as Annabella
- Uncle Vanya as Helena
- JFK vs. the UFO's as Peaches

Andrews also had parts, including improvisational and sketches, in Campaign 2025, Ka-Baam!, Scrambled Eggs, and 600 Days of Pain.

== Awards and nominations ==
Year	Award	Category	Work	Result
2007	Instant Films	Best Cast	The Ultimate Ceremony	Won
2008	South African Horrorfest	Best Lead - Female	Wretched	Won
2008	L.A. Weekly Theater Award	Best Ensemble	The Swine Show	Nominated
2006 & 2008	Sacred Fools Theater Company	Actress Award	Serial Killers	Won
2013	L.A. Weekly Theater Award	Best Ensemble	Absolutely Filthy (An Unauthorized Peanuts Parody)	Won
2014	New York International Fringe Festival	Overall Play	Absolutely Filthy (An Unauthorized Peanuts Parody)	Won
2015	Hollywood Fringe Festival	Best Ensemble Theatre	Cookie & the Monster	Won
2017	Hollywood Fringe Festival	Best Ensemble Theatre	Night Witches	Won
2022	Lady Filmmakers Festival	Best Actress - Feature Film	Division	Won
2022	Lady Filmmakers Festival	Best Ladies First - Feature Film	Division	Won
2022	Lady Filmmakers Festival	Blockbuster - Feature Film	Division	Won
