= A Clockwork Orange (novel) =

1962 novel by Anthony Burgess

- Dust jacket from the first edition
- Author: Anthony Burgess
- Cover artist: Barry Trengove
- Language: English
- Genre: Science fiction, dystopian fiction, satire, black comedy
- Published: 17 March 1962 (William Heinemann, UK)
- Publication place: United Kingdom
- Media type: Print (hardback & paperback) & audio book (cassette, CD)
- Pages: 192 pages (hardback edition); 176 pages (paperback edition)
- ISBN: 978-0-434-09800-2
- OCLC: 4205836

A Clockwork Orange is a novel by the English writer Anthony Burgess, published on 17 March 1962. It is set in a near-future society that has a youth subculture of extreme violence. The teenage protagonist, Alex, narrates his violent exploits and his experiences with state authorities intent on reforming him. The book is partially written in a Russian-influenced argot called "Nadsat", which takes its name from the Russian suffix that is equivalent to '-teen' in English. According to Burgess, the novel was a jeu d'esprit written in just three weeks.

In 2005, A Clockwork Orange was included on Time magazine's list of the 100 best English-language novels written since 1923, and it was named by Modern Library and its readers as one of the 100 best English-language novels of the 20th century. The original manuscript of the book has been kept at McMaster University's William Ready Division of Archives and Research Collections in Hamilton, Ontario, Canada, since the institution purchased the documents in 1971. It is considered one of the most influential dystopian books.

In 2022, the novel was included on the "Big Jubilee Read" list of 70 books by Commonwealth authors selected to celebrate the Platinum Jubilee of Elizabeth II.

== Plot summary ==
=== Part 1: Alex's world ===
Alex is a 15-year-old gang leader living in a near-future dystopian city. His friends ("droogs" in the novel's Anglo-Russian slang, "Nadsat") and fellow gang members are Dim, a slow-witted bruiser, who is the gang's muscle; Georgie, an ambitious second-in-command; and Pete, who mostly plays along as the droogs indulge their taste for "ultra-violence" (random, violent mayhem). Characterised as a sociopath and hardened juvenile delinquent, Alex is also intelligent, quick-witted, and enjoys classical music; he is particularly fond of Beethoven, whom he calls "Lovely Ludwig Van".

The droogs sit in their favourite hangout, the Korova Milk Bar, drinking "milk-plus" (milk laced with the customer's drug of choice) to prepare for a night of ultra-violence. They assault a scholar walking home from the public library; rob a shop, leaving the owner and his wife bloodied and unconscious; beat up a beggar; then scuffle with a rival gang. Joyriding through the countryside in a stolen car, they break into an isolated cottage and terrorise the young couple living there, beating the husband and gang-raping his wife. The husband is a writer working on a manuscript entitled A Clockwork Orange, and Alex contemptuously reads out a paragraph that states the novel's main theme before shredding the manuscript. At the Korova, Alex strikes Dim for his crude response to a woman's singing of an operatic passage, and strains within the gang become apparent. At home in his parents' flat, Alex plays classical music at top volume, which he describes as giving him orgasmic bliss before falling asleep.

Alex feigns illness to his parents to stay out of school the next day. Following an unexpected visit from P. R. Deltoid, his "post-corrective adviser", Alex visits a record store, where he meets two pre-teen girls. He invites them back to the flat, where he drugs and rapes them. That night after a nap, Alex finds his droogs in a mutinous mood, waiting downstairs in the torn-up and graffitied lobby. Georgie challenges Alex for leadership of the gang, demanding that they focus on higher-value targets in their robberies. Alex quells the rebellion by slashing Dim's hand and fighting with Georgie, then soothes the gang by agreeing to Georgie's plan to rob the home of a wealthy elderly woman. Alex breaks in and knocks the woman unconscious, but when he hears sirens and opens the door to flee, Dim strikes him as revenge for the earlier fight. The gang abandons Alex on the front step to be arrested by the police; while in custody, he learns that the woman has died from her injuries.

=== Part 2: The Ludovico Technique ===
Alex is convicted of murder and sentenced to 14 years in prison. His parents visit one day to inform him that Georgie has been killed in a botched robbery. Two years into his term, he has obtained a job in one of the prison chapels, playing music on the stereo to accompany the Sunday Christian services. After his fellow cellmates blame him for beating a troublesome cellmate to death, he is chosen to undergo an experimental behaviour modification treatment called the Ludovico Technique in exchange for having the remainder of his sentence commuted. The technique is a form of aversion therapy in which Alex is injected with nausea-inducing drugs while watching graphically violent films, eventually conditioning him to become severely ill at the mere thought of violence. As an unintended consequence, the soundtrack to one of the films, Beethoven's Ninth Symphony, renders Alex unable to enjoy his beloved classical music as before.

The technique's effectiveness is demonstrated to a group of VIPs, who watch as Alex collapses before a man who slaps him and abases himself before a scantily clad young woman. Although the prison chaplain accuses the state of stripping Alex of free will, the government officials on the scene are pleased with the results, and Alex is released from prison.

=== Part 3: After prison ===
Alex returns to his parents' flat, only to find that they are letting his room to a lodger, whom his parents treat like a new son. Now homeless, he wanders the streets and enters a public library, hoping to learn of a painless method for suicide. The old scholar whom Alex had assaulted in Part 1 finds him and beats him with the help of several friends. Two policemen come to Alex's rescue, but they turn out to be Dim and Billyboy, a former rival gang leader. They take Alex outside town, brutalise him, rape him, and abandon him there. Alex collapses at the door of an isolated cottage, realising too late that it is the one he and his droogs invaded in Part 1.

The writer, F. Alexander, still lives here, but his wife has since died of what he believes to be injuries she sustained in the rape. He does not recognise Alex but gives him shelter and questions him about the conditioning he has undergone. Alexander and his colleagues, all highly critical of the government, plan to use Alex as a symbol of state brutality and thus prevent the incumbent government from being re-elected. After Alex inadvertently reveals that he was the ringleader of the home invasion, he is removed from the cottage and locked in an upper-storey bedroom as a relentless barrage of classical music plays over speakers. He attempts suicide by leaping from the window.

Alex wakes up in a hospital, where he is courted by government officials, anxious to counter the bad publicity created by his suicide attempt. He is informed that F. Alexander has been "put away" for Alex's protection and his own. Alex is offered a well-paying job if he agrees to side with the government once discharged. A round of tests reveals that his old violent impulses have returned, indicating that the hospital doctors have undone the effects of his conditioning. As photographers snap pictures, Alex daydreams of orgiastic violence and reflects, "I was cured all right."

In the final chapter, Alex—now 18 years old and working for the nation's musical recording archives—finds himself halfheartedly preparing for another night of crime with a new gang (Len, Rick, and Bully). After a chance encounter with Pete, who has reformed and married, Alex finds himself taking less and less pleasure in acts of senseless violence. He begins contemplating giving up crime himself to become a productive member of society and start a family of his own while reflecting on the notion that his children could end up being just as destructive as he has been, if not more so.

== Omission of the final chapter in the US ==
The book has three parts, each with seven chapters. Burgess has stated that the total of 21 chapters was an intentional nod to the age of 21 being recognised as a milestone in human maturation. The 21st chapter was omitted from the editions published in the United States prior to 1986. In the introduction to the updated American text (these newer editions include the missing 21st chapter), Burgess explains that when he first brought the book to an American publisher, he was told that US audiences would never go for the final chapter, in which Alex sees the error of his ways, decides he has lost his taste for violence and resolves to turn his life around.

At the American publisher's insistence, Burgess allowed its editors to cut the redeeming final chapter from the US version, so that the tale would end on a darker note, with Alex becoming his old, ultraviolent self again – an ending which the publisher insisted would be "more realistic" and appealing to a US audience. The film adaptation, directed by Stanley Kubrick, is based on the American edition of the book, which Burgess initially liked, but later preferred the British conclusion. Kubrick called Chapter 21 "an extra chapter" and claimed that he had not read the original version until he had virtually finished the screenplay and that he had never given serious consideration to using it. In Kubrick's opinion – as in the opinion of other readers, including the original American editor – the final chapter was unconvincing and inconsistent with the book.

== Characters ==
- Alex: The novel's protagonist and leader among his droogs. He often refers to himself as "Your Humble Narrator". Having coaxed two ten-year-old girls into his bedroom, Alex refers to himself as "Alexander the Large" while raping them; this was later the basis for Alex's claimed surname DeLarge in the 1971 film.
- George, Georgie or Georgie Boy: Effectively Alex's greedy second-in-command. Georgie attempts to undermine Alex's status as leader of the gang and take over their gang as the new leader. He is later killed during a botched robbery while Alex is in prison.
- Pete: The only one who does not take particular sides when the droogs fight among themselves. He later meets and marries a girl named Georgina, renouncing his violent ways and even losing his former (Nadsat) speech patterns. A chance encounter with Pete in the final chapter influences Alex to realise that he has grown bored with violence and recognise that human energy is better expended on creation than destruction.
- Dim: An idiotic and thoroughly gormless member of the gang, persistently condescended to by Alex, but respected to some extent by his droogs for his formidable fighting abilities, his weapon of choice being a length of bike chain. He later becomes a police officer, exacting his revenge on Alex for the abuse he once suffered under his command.
- P. R. Deltoid: A criminal rehabilitation social worker assigned the task of keeping Alex on the straight and narrow. He seemingly has no clue about dealing with young people, and is devoid of empathy or understanding for his troublesome charge. Indeed, when Alex is arrested for murdering an old woman and then ferociously beaten by several police officers, Deltoid simply spits on him repeatedly.
- Prison Chaplain: The character who first questions whether it is moral to turn a violent person into a behavioural automaton who can make no choice in such matters. This is the only character who is truly concerned about Alex's welfare; he is not taken seriously by Alex, though. He is nicknamed by Alex "prison charlie" or "chaplin", a pun on Charlie Chaplin.
- Billyboy: A rival of Alex's. Early on in the story, Alex and his droogs battle Billyboy and his droogs, which ends abruptly when the police arrive. Later, after Alex is released from prison, Billyboy (along with Dim, who like Billyboy has become a police officer) rescues Alex from a mob, then subsequently beats him in a location out of town.
- Prison Governor: The man who decides to let Alex "choose" to be the first reformed by the Ludovico technique.
- The Minister of the Interior: The government high-official who determined that the Ludovico's technique will be used to cut recidivism. He is referred to as the Minister of Interior or Inferior by Alex.
- Dr Branom: A scientist, co-developer of the Ludovico technique. He appears friendly and almost paternal towards Alex at first, before forcing him into the theatre and what Alex calls the "chair of torture".
- Dr Brodsky: Branom's colleague and co-developer of the Ludovico technique. He seems much more passive than Branom and says considerably less.
- F. Alexander: An author who was in the process of typing his magnum opus A Clockwork Orange when Alex and his droogs broke into his house, beat him, tore up his work and then brutally gang-raped his wife, which caused her subsequent death. He is left deeply scarred by these events and when he encounters Alex two years later, he uses him as a guinea pig in a sadistic experiment intended to prove the Ludovico technique unsound. The government imprisons him afterwards. He is given the name Frank Alexander in the film.
- Cat Woman: An indirectly named woman who blocks Alex's gang's entrance scheme, and threatens to shoot Alex and set her cats on him if he does not leave. After Alex breaks into her house, she fights with him, ordering her cats to join the melee, but reprimands Alex for fighting them off. She sustains a fatal blow to the head during the scuffle. She is given the name Miss Weathers in the film.

== Analysis ==
=== Background ===
A Clockwork Orange was written in Hove, then a senescent English seaside town. Burgess had arrived back in Britain after his stint abroad to see that much had changed. A youth culture had developed, based around coffee bars, pop music and teenage gangs. England was gripped by fears over juvenile delinquency. Burgess stated that the novel's inspiration was his first wife Lynne's beating by a gang of drunk American servicemen stationed in England during World War II. She subsequently miscarried. In its investigation of free will, the book's target is ostensibly the concept of behaviourism, pioneered by such figures as B. F. Skinner. Burgess later stated that he wrote the book in three weeks.

=== Title ===
Burgess has offered several clarifications about the meaning and origin of its title:

- He had overheard the phrase "as queer as a clockwork orange" in a London pub in 1945 and assumed it was a Cockney expression. In Clockwork Marmalade, an essay published in the Listener in 1972, he said that he had heard the phrase several times since that occasion. He also explained the title in response to a question from William Everson on the television programme Camera Three in 1972,
  Well, the title has a very different meaning but only to a particular generation of London Cockneys. It's a phrase which I heard many years ago and so fell in love with, I wanted to use it, the title of the book. But the phrase itself I did not make up. The phrase "as queer as a clockwork orange" is good old East London slang and it didn't seem to me necessary to explain it. Now, obviously, I have to give it an extra meaning. I've implied an extra dimension. I've implied the junction of the organic, the lively, the sweet – in other words, life, the orange – and the mechanical, the cold, the disciplined. I've brought them together in this kind of oxymoron, this sour-sweet word.
  — Anthony Burgess, An examination of Kubrick's A Clockwork Orange

No other record of the expression being used before 1962 has ever appeared, with Kingsley Amis going so far as to note in his Memoirs (1991) that no trace of it appears in Eric Partridge's Dictionary of Historical Slang. However, saying "as queer as ..." followed by an improbable object: "... a clockwork orange", or "... a four-speed walking stick" or "... a left-handed corkscrew" etc. predates Burgess's novel. An early example, "as queer as Dick's hatband", appeared in 1796, and was alluded to in 1757.

- His second explanation was that it was a pun on the Malay word orang, meaning "man". The novella contains no other Malay words or links.
- In a prefatory note to A Clockwork Orange: A Play with Music, he wrote that the title was a metaphor for "an organic entity, full of juice and sweetness and agreeable odour, being turned into a mechanism".
- In his essay Clockwork Oranges, Burgess asserts that "this title would be appropriate for a story about the application of Pavlovian or mechanical laws to an organism which, like a fruit, was capable of colour and sweetness".
- While addressing the reader in a letter before some editions of the book, the author says that when a man ceases to have free will, he is no longer a man. "Just a clockwork orange", a shiny, appealing object, but "just a toy to be wound-up by either God or the Devil, or (what is increasingly replacing both) the State."

This title alludes to the protagonist's negative emotional responses to feelings of evil which prevent the exercise of his free will subsequent to the administration of the Ludovico Technique. To induce this conditioning, Alex is forced to watch scenes of violence on a screen that are systematically paired with negative physical stimulation. The negative physical stimulation takes the form of nausea and "feelings of terror", which are caused by an emetic medicine administered just before the presentation of the films.

In its original drafts, Burgess used the working title 'The Ludovico Technique,' as he himself described in the foreword in the April 1995 publication. Along with removing the 21st chapter as insisted by his publisher in the original 1962 edition, he would also change the finished product's name to its current title.

=== Use of slang ===
The book, narrated by Alex, contains many words in a slang argot which Burgess invented for the book, called Nadsat. It is a mix of modified Slavic words, Cockney rhyming slang and derived Russian (like baboochka). For instance, these terms have the following meanings in Nadsat: droog (друг) = friend; moloko (молоко) = milk; gulliver (голова) = head; malchick (мальчик) or malchickiwick = boy; soomka (сумка) = sack or bag; Bog (Бог) = God; horrorshow (хорошо) = good; prestoopnick (преступник) = criminal; rooker (рука) = hand; cal (кал) = crap; veck (человек) = man or guy; litso (лицо) = face; malenky (маленький) = little; and so on. Some words Burgess invented himself or just adapted from existing languages. Compare Polari.

One of Alex's doctors explains the language to a colleague as "odd bits of old rhyming slang; a bit of gypsy talk, too. But most of the roots are Slav propaganda. Subliminal penetration." Some words are not derived from anything, but merely easy to guess, e.g. "in-out, in-out" or "the old in-out" means sexual intercourse. Cutter, however, means "money", because "cutter" rhymes with "bread-and-butter"; this is rhyming slang, which is intended to be impenetrable to outsiders (especially eavesdropping policemen). Additionally, slang like appypolly loggy ("apology") seems to derive from school boy slang. This reflects Alex's age of 15.

In the first edition of the book, no key was provided, and the reader was left to interpret the meaning from the context. In his appendix to the restored edition, Burgess explained that the slang would keep the book from seeming dated, and served to muffle "the raw response of pornography" from the acts of violence.

The term "ultraviolence", referring to excessive or unjustified violence, was coined by Burgess in the book, which includes the phrase "do the ultra-violent". The term's association with aesthetic violence has led to its use in the media.

=== Banning and censorship history in the US ===
A Clockwork Orange has regularly been banned and challenged in the United States. The first major incident of censorship of A Clockwork Orange took place in 1973, when a bookseller was arrested for selling the novel (although the charges were later dropped). In 1976, A Clockwork Orange was removed from an Aurora, Colorado high school because of "objectionable language". A year later in 1977 it was removed from high school classrooms in Westport, Massachusetts over similar concerns with "objectionable" language. In 1982, it was removed from two Anniston, Alabama libraries, later to be reinstated on a restricted basis. However, each of these instances came after the release of Stanley Kubrick's popular 1971 film adaptation of A Clockwork Orange, itself the subject of much controversy after exposing a much larger part of the populace to the themes of the novel. In 2024 the book was banned in Texas by the Katy Independent School District. In 2025, the American Library Association named A Clockwork Orange the eighth most banned and challenged book in the United States.

== Reception ==
=== Initial response ===
The Sunday Telegraph review was positive, and described the book as "entertaining ... even profound". Kingsley Amis in The Observer acclaimed the novel as "cheerful horror", writing "Mr Burgess has written a fine farrago of outrageousness, one which incidentally suggests a view of juvenile violence I can't remember having met before". Malcolm Bradbury wrote "All of Mr Burgess's powers as a comic writer, which are considerable, have gone into the rich language of his inverted Utopia. If you can stomach the horrors, you'll enjoy the manner". Roald Dahl called it "a terrifying and marvellous book". Many reviewers praised the inventiveness of the language, but expressed unease at the violent subject matter. The Spectator praised Burgess's "extraordinary technical feat" but was uncomfortable with "a certain arbitrariness about the plot which is slightly irritating". New Statesman acclaimed Burgess for addressing "acutely and savagely the tendencies of our time" but called the book "a great strain to read". The Sunday Times review was negative, and described the book as "a very ordinary, brutal and psychologically shallow story". The Times also reviewed the book negatively, describing it as "a somewhat clumsy experiment with science fiction [with] clumsy cliches about juvenile delinquency". The violence was criticised as "unconvincing in detail".

=== Writer's appraisal ===
Burgess dismissed A Clockwork Orange as "too didactic to be artistic". He said that the violent content of the novel "nauseated" him.

In 1985, Burgess published Flame into Being: The Life and Work of D. H. Lawrence and while discussing Lady Chatterley's Lover in his biography, Burgess compared the notoriety of D. H. Lawrence's novel with A Clockwork Orange: "We all suffer from the popular desire to make the known notorious. The book I am best known for, or only known for, is a novel I am prepared to repudiate: written a quarter of a century ago, a jeu d'esprit knocked off for money in three weeks, it became known as the raw material for a film which seemed to glorify sex and violence. The film made it easy for readers of the book to misunderstand what it was about, and the misunderstanding will pursue me until I die. I should not have written the book because of this danger of misinterpretation, and the same may be said of Lawrence and Lady Chatterley's Lover."

=== Awards and nominations and rankings ===
- 1983 – Prometheus Award (Preliminary Nominee)
- 1999 – Prometheus Award (Nomination)
- 2002 – Prometheus Award (Nomination)
- 2003 – Prometheus Award (Nomination)
- 2006 – Prometheus Award (Nomination)
- 2008 – Prometheus Award (Hall of Fame Award)

A Clockwork Orange was chosen by Time magazine as one of the 100 best English-language books from 1923 to 2005.

== Adaptations ==
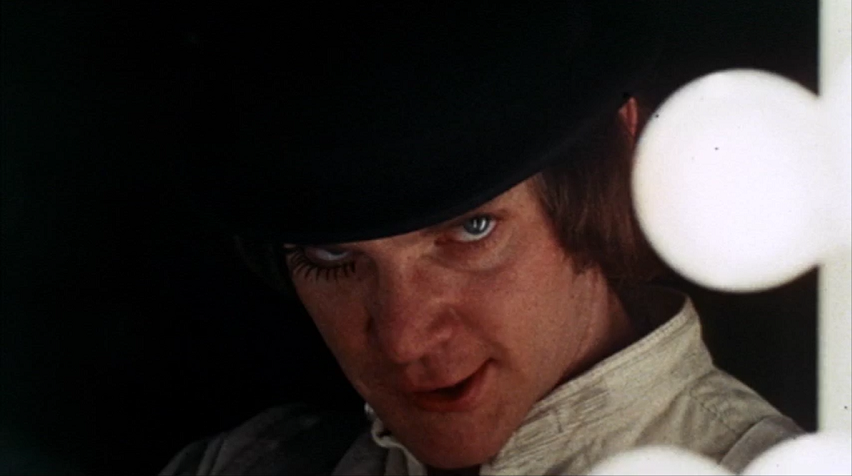
Alex DeLarge in Kubrick's dystopian film A Clockwork Orange (1971)

A 1965 film by Andy Warhol entitled Vinyl was an adaptation of Burgess's novel.

The best known adaptation of the novel is the 1971 film A Clockwork Orange by Stanley Kubrick, with Malcolm McDowell as Alex. In 1987, Burgess published a stage play titled A Clockwork Orange: A Play with Music. The play includes songs, written by Burgess, which are inspired by Beethoven and Nadsat slang.

In 1988, a German adaptation of A Clockwork Orange at the intimate theatre of Bad Godesberg featured a musical score by the German punk rock band Die Toten Hosen which, combined with orchestral clips of Beethoven's Ninth Symphony and "other dirty melodies" (so stated by the subtitle), was released on the album Ein kleines bisschen Horrorschau. The track Hier kommt Alex became one of the band's signature songs.

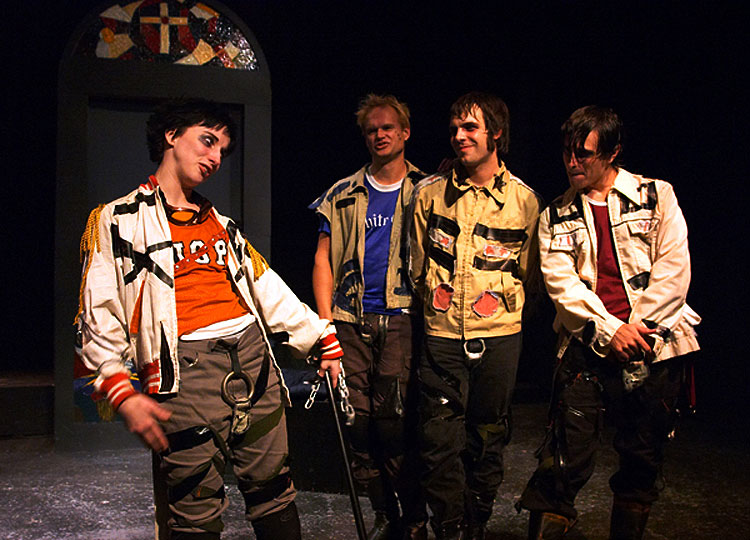
Vanessa Claire Smith, Sterling Wolfe, Michael Holmes, and Ricky Coates in Brad Mays' multi-media stage production of A Clockwork Orange, 2003, Los Angeles. (photo: Peter Zuehlke)

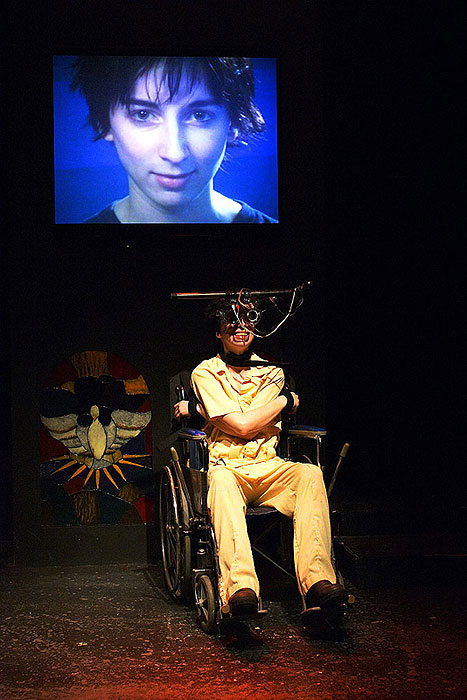
Vanessa Claire Smith in Brad Mays' multi-media stage production of A Clockwork Orange, 2003, Los Angeles. (photo: Peter Zuehlke)

In February 1990, another musical version was produced at the Barbican Theatre in London by the Royal Shakespeare Company. Titled A Clockwork Orange: 2004, it received mostly negative reviews, with John Peter of The Sunday Times of London calling it "only an intellectual Rocky Horror Show", and John Gross of The Sunday Telegraph calling it "a clockwork lemon". Even Burgess himself, who wrote the script based on his novel, was disappointed. According to The Evening Standard, he called the score, written by Bono and The Edge of the rock group U2, "neo-wallpaper". Burgess had originally worked alongside the director of the production, Ron Daniels, and envisioned a musical score that was entirely classical. Unhappy with the decision to abandon that score, he heavily criticised the band's experimental mix of hip-hop, liturgical, and gothic music. Lise Hand of The Irish Independent reported The Edge as saying that Burgess's original conception was "a score written by a novelist rather than a songwriter". Calling it "meaningless glitz", Jane Edwardes of 20/20 magazine said that watching this production was "like being invited to an expensive French Restaurant – and being served with a Big Mac."

In 1994, Chicago's Steppenwolf Theater put on a production of A Clockwork Orange directed by Terry Kinney. The American premiere of novelist Anthony Burgess's own adaptation of his A Clockwork Orange starred K. Todd Freeman as Alex. In 2001, UNI Theatre (Mississauga, Ontario) presented the Canadian premiere of the play under the direction of Terry Costa.

In 2002, Godlight Theatre Company presented the New York Premiere adaptation of A Clockwork Orange at Manhattan Theatre Source. The production went on to play at the SoHo Playhouse (2002), Ensemble Studio Theatre (2004), 59E59 Theaters (2005) and the Edinburgh Festival Fringe (2005). While at Edinburgh, the production received rave reviews from the press while playing to sold-out audiences. The production was directed by Godlight's artistic director, Joe Tantalo.

Also in 2002, an adaptation was made in Brazil by director Paulo Afonso de Lima, starring Augusto Negrelly, Arlindo Lopes and Gabriela Werneck. The play debuted on 7 March 2002 at the Centro Cultural Banco do Brasil in Brasília.

In 2003, Los Angeles director Brad Mays and the ARK Theatre Company staged a multi-media adaptation of A Clockwork Orange, which was named "Pick of the Week" by the LA Weekly and nominated for three of the 2004 LA Weekly Theater Awards: Direction, Revival Production (of a 20th-century work), and Leading Female Performance. Vanessa Claire Smith won Best Actress for her gender-bending portrayal of Alex, the music-loving teenage sociopath. This production utilised three separate video streams outputted to seven onstage video monitors – six 19-inch and one 40-inch. In order to preserve the first-person narrative of the book, a pre-recorded video stream of Alex, "your humble narrator", was projected onto the 40-inch monitor, thereby freeing the onstage character during passages which would have been awkward or impossible to sustain in the breaking of the fourth wall.

An adaptation of the work, based on the original novel, the film and Burgess's own stage version, was performed by the SiLo Theatre in Auckland, New Zealand in early 2007.

In 2021, the International Anthony Burgess Foundation premiered a webpage cataloguing various productions of A Clockwork Orange from around the world.

== See also ==
- Classical conditioning
- List of cultural references to A Clockwork Orange
- List of stories set in a future now in the past
- MKUltra
- Violence in art
