= Sacred Fools Theater Company =

Los Angeles-based theatre company

The Sacred Fools Theater Company is a Los Angeles–based theatre company and nonprofit organization. Founded in January 1997, the company is a member organization of the LA Stage Alliance.

For 18 years the company resided at 660 N. Heliotrope in The Heliotrope Theatre. In January 2016 they moved to The Broadwater Studio, a multi-theater complex at 1078 Lillian Way, Los Angeles.

== Organization ==
Sacred Fools is governed partly by a non-dues paying company and partly by a traditional board of directors. A three-person Artistic Committee is elected each season from by the company, and also a three-person membership committee. The board of directors oversees business matters. Sacred Fools has an open door policy and does not restrict directors to casting actors from within the company. Sacred Fools is a primarily volunteer-run organization, and say they are "100% democratically-led."

For Season 16 (2012–2013), the artistic directors were Alyssa Preston, Leon Russom, and French Stewart. For Season 17 (2013–2014), the artistic directors were Rebecca Larsen, Jonas Oppenheim, and Ben Rock. For Season 18 (2014–2015), the artistic directors were Tifanie McQueen, Guy Picot, and Ben Rock. For Season 19 (2015–2016), the artistic directors were Bryan Bellomo, Paul Plunkett and Vanessa Claire Stewart. For Season 20 (2016–2017), the artistic directors were Bryan Bellomo, Danielle Ozymandias, and Alicia Conway Rock. For its 25th season (2021-2022), the artistic directors were Scott Golden, Marc Antonio Pritchett and Vanessa Stewart. As of summer 2024, Padraic Duffy was the company's managing director, with Scott Leggett serving as producing director/interim artistic director.

== History ==
The Sacred Fools Theater Company was founded by John Sylvain and a group of theater artists in Sylvain's Santa Monica living room. The group very quickly formed a non-profit corporation, raised money, and found a space. They initially subleased the 660 N. Heliotrope space from Deaf West Theatre, and eventually leased the space outright.

Since its founding, Sacred Fools has produced over 100 different shows, including several World Premieres, West Coast Premieres, and Los Angeles Premieres.

== Notable artists ==
- Jaime Andrews
- Steven Banks
- Abraham Benrubi
- Jennifer R. Blake
- Dean Cameron
- Henry Dittman
- Richard Elfman
- Jenna Fischer
- Maile Flanagan
- Stuart Gordon
- Jon Hamm
- Brendan E. Hunt
- David Huynh
- Arthur M. Jolly
- Elaine Kao
- Carrie Keranen
- Matthew Yang King
- Phil LaMarr
- Laurie Metcalf
- Julio Perillán
- Jenelle Riley
- Ben Rock
- Leon Russom
- French Stewart
- Vanessa Claire Stewart

== Notable productions ==
- 2000: 2G's - Directed by Scott Rabinowitz. A hip-hop version of Shakespeare's The Two Gentlemen of Verona, 2G's was nominated for 7 NAACP awards and won 2 - Best Director for Scott Rabinowitz and Best Choreography for Joe Hernandez-Kolski. The show was extended for an open-ended run at the Martini Lounge. It ran on the Sacred Fools' Mainstage from May 18-June 17, 2000 and was also chosen as L.A. Weekly's Pick of the Week.
- 2003: The Nigerian Spam Scam Scam (World Premiere) - This play by Dean Cameron has continued to tour around the world.
- 2005: Love Tapes (World Premiere) - Winner of the 2005 L.A. Weekly Award for Comedy Direction (Jessie Marion). Also nominated for Comedy Performance (Dean Cameron), Comedy Performance (Julie Mullen), Play Writing (Steven Banks and Penn Jillette). Named "Best Comedy of the Year" by Robert Axelrod of ReviewPlays.com.
- 2008: Louis & Keely: Live at the Sahara (World Premiere) -- In 2008, Vanessa Claire Stewart and Jake Broder wrote and starred in this new musical, which went on to be nominated for four Ovation Awards, including the Franklin R. Levy Award for Musical in an Intimate Theatre, which it won. The production went on to a second run at The Matrix Theatre Company, where Keely Smith herself attended a performance. A greatly revised version directed by film director Taylor Hackford and still starring Stewart and Broder premiered at the Geffen Playhouse in 2009; Hackford's production was remounted in 2015 in Chicago at the Royal George Theatre, with Stewart now co-starring with Tony winner Anthony Crivello.
- 2009: Savin’ Up For Saturday Night: The Honky-Tonk Musical (World Premiere) - Songs by Richard Levinson, book by Jeff Goode, directed by Jeremy Aldridge. This original musical premiered on September 21, 2009. It was nominated for the LA Stage Alliance's Ovation Award for Best Music and Lyrics. Lead actor Brendan Hunt won the 2010 Ovation Award for Lead Actor in a Musical. The show is now published by Samuel French, Inc.
- 2010: Watson: the Last Great Tale of the Legendary Sherlock Holmes (World Premiere) - Nominated for four Ovation Awards, including Best Director (Jaime Robledo), Lead Actor in a Play (Joe Fria as Sherlock Holmes), and two nominations for Featured Actor in a Play (Henry Dittman as James Moriarty and French Stewart as Freud/Queen Victoria). The play was published by Steele Spring Theatrical Licensing, and was subsequently produced at the Gretna Theatre in Pennsylvania.
- 2011: Voice Lessons - Nominated for four Ovation Awards including Best Play in an Intimate Theatre (Linda Toliver and Gary Guidinger in Association with Sacred Fools Theater Company), Acting Ensemble for a Play (Laurie Metcalf, French Stewart & Maile Flanagan), Lead Actor in a Play (French Stewart as Nate), and Lead Actress in a Play (Laurie Metcalf as Virginia).
- 2012: Stoneface: The Rise and Fall and Rise of Buster Keaton (World Premiere) - Written by Vanessa Claire Smith and starring French Stewart. This tribute to Buster Keaton was remounted at Pasadena Playhouse in 2014.
- 2013: Neverwhere (West Coast Premiere) -- On April 5, 2013, Sacred Fools performed the American West Coast premiere of Robert Kauzlaric's adaptation of Neil Gaiman's urban fantasy television series and later novelization of the same name. Originally scheduled to run through May 11, it was extended an additional two weeks due to its popularity. Neil Gaiman attended a performance of the production.
- 2013: Absolutely Filthy (An Unauthorized Peanuts Parody) (World Premiere) - Developed by writer/actor Brendan E. Hunt as part of the late night series, "Serial Killers", this unauthorized Peanuts adaptation had a successful run in 2013, and then an additional run later that year at the Hollywood Fringe Festival, at which it won three awards, including the highest honor Top of the Fringe, as well as Best in Comedy, and Spirit of Fringe Best Performance (Male) for writer/star Brendan Hunt. The following year, the show returned for two more runs, at South Coast Repertory and the New York International Fringe Festival.
- 2013: Do Androids Dream of Electric Sheep? (West Coast Premiere) - A stage adaptation of the science-fiction novel by Philip K. Dick, adapted by Edward Einhorn, made its West Coast Premiere at Sacred Fools on Sept. 13, 2013. The production was nominated for an LA Weekly Theater Award.
- 2015: Miravel: Or, the Promise of Alphonso Block. This original chamber musical by Jake Broder, inspired by Cyrano de Bergerac and the novel Gertrud by Hermann Hesse, won several local awards, and was selected as Critic's Choice by the Los Angeles Times.
- 2019: Waiting for Waiting for Godot, an original play by Dave Hanson which the Los Angeles Times called "a witty hommage to Beckett’s classic, is a raw and revealing glimpse into the actor’s existential dilemma, the helplessness that derives from being an interpreter, forever reliant on any number of random factors before plying one’s chosen craft."
- 2023: Raise Your Hand... From the DEAD!! by Natalie Nicole Dressel was performed at the Hollywood Fringe. Directed by Jay Dutcher, the show was nominated at for Best Comedy at the HFF23 Awards. It was originally created during Covid and given an ending for the HFF23 season.
- 2024: Pamela Quinn Eberhardt’s original play This Show is Surrounded by True Events, directed by Scott Leggett, was performed as part of the Hollywood Fringe Festival from June 9-June 30 in Los Angeles at the Broadwater Black Box.
