= Nadsat =

Fictional language in A Clockwork Orange

- Created by: Anthony Burgess
- Date: 1962
- Setting and usage: A Clockwork Orange (novel and film)
- Purpose: Constructed languages: Artistic languages; Fictional languages; Nadsat
- Writing system: Latin script

Language codes
- ISO 639-3: None (mis)
- Glottolog: None
- IETF: art-x-nadsat

Nadsat is a fictional register or argot used by the teenage gang members in Anthony Burgess' dystopian novel A Clockwork Orange. Burgess was a linguist and he used this background to depict his characters as speaking a form of Russian-influenced English. The name comes from the Russian suffix equivalent of -teen as in thirteen (-надцать, -nad·tsat). Nadsat was also used in Stanley Kubrick's film adaptation of the book.

"Quaint," said Dr. Brodsky, like smiling, "the dialect of the tribe. Do you know anything of its provenance, Branom?" "Odd bits of old rhyming slang," said Dr. Branom ... "A bit of gipsy talk, too. But most of the roots are Slav. Propaganda. Subliminal penetration."

— Drs. Brodsky and Branom, A Clockwork Orange, page 114.

== Description ==
Nadsat is a mode of speech used by the nadsat, members of the teen subculture in the novel A Clockwork Orange. The narrator and protagonist of the book, Alex, uses it in first-person style to relate the story to the reader. He also uses it to communicate with other characters in the novel, such as his droogs, parents, victims and any authority-figures with whom he comes in contact. Alex is capable of speaking standard English when he wants to. It is not a written language: the sense that readers get is of a transcription of vernacular speech.

Nadsat is English with some borrowed words from Russian. It also contains influences from Cockney rhyming slang, the King James Bible, German, some words of unclear origin and some that Burgess invented. The word nadsat is the suffix of Russian numerals from 11 to 19 (-надцать). The suffix is an almost exact linguistic parallel to the English -teen and is derived from на, meaning 'on' and a shortened form of десять, the number ten. Droog is derived from the Welsh word drwg, meaning 'bad', 'naughty' or 'evil' and the Russian word друг, meaning a 'close friend'. Some of the words are almost childish plays on English words, such as eggiweg ('egg') and appy polly loggy ('apology'), as well as regular English slang sod and snuff it. The word like and the expression the old are often used as fillers or discourse markers.

The original 1991 translation of Burgess's book into Russian solved the problem of how to illustrate the Nadsat words by using transliterated, slang English words in places where Burgess had used Russian ones – for example, droogs became фрэнды (frendy). Borrowed English words with Russian inflection were widely used in Russian slang, especially among Russian hippies in the 1970s–1980s.

== Function ==
Burgess was a polyglot who loved language in all its forms. However, he realized that if he used contemporary slang, the novel would very quickly become dated, owing to the way in which teenage language is constantly changing. He was therefore forced to invent his own vocabulary, and to set the book in an imaginary future. Burgess was later to point out that, ironically, some of the Nadsat words in the book had been appropriated by American teenagers, "and thus shoved [his] future into the discardable past." His use of Nadsat was pragmatic; he needed his narrator to have a unique voice that would remain ageless, while reinforcing Alex's indifference to his society's norms, and to suggest that youth subculture was independent from the rest of society. In A Clockwork Orange, Alex's interrogators describe the source of his argot as "subliminal penetration".

== Russian influences ==
Russian influences play the biggest role in Nadsat. Most of those Russian-influenced words are slightly anglicized loan-words, often maintaining the original Russian pronunciation. One example is the Russian word lyudi, which is anglicized to lewdies, meaning 'people'. Another Russian word is bábushka which is anglicized to baboochka, meaning 'grandmother', 'old woman'. Some of the anglicized words are truncated, for example pony from ponimát’, 'to understand', or otherwise shortened, for example veck from čelovék, 'person, man', though the anglicized word chelloveck is also used in the book.

A further means of constructing Nadsat words is the employment of homophones (known as folk etymology). For example, one Nadsat term which may seem like an English composition, horrorshow, actually stems from the Russian word for 'good'; khorosho, which sounds similar to horrorshow. In this same manner many of the Russian loan-words become an English–Russian hybrid, with Russian origins, and English spellings and pronunciations. A further example is the Russian word for 'head', golová, which sounds similar to Gulliver known from Gulliver's Travels; Gulliver became the Nadsat expression for the concept 'head'.

Many of Burgess's loan-words, such as devotchka ('girl') and droog ('friend'), maintain both their relative spelling and meaning over the course of translation.

== Other influences ==
Additional words were borrowed from other languages: A (possibly Saudi-owned) hotel was named 'Al Idayyin, an Arabic-sounding variant on "Holiday Inn" Hotel chain, while also alluding to the name Aladdin.

== Word derivation by common techniques ==
Nadsat's English slang is constructed with common language-formation techniques. Some words are blended, others clipped or compounded. In Nadsat language a 'fit of laughter' becomes a guff (shortened version of guffawing); a 'skeleton key' becomes a polyclef ('many keys'); and the 'state jail' is blended to the staja, which has the double entendre stager, so that its prisoners got there by a staged act of corruption, as revenge by the state, an interpretation that would fit smoothly into the storyline. Many common English slang terms are simply shortened. A cancer stick, which is (or was) a common English-slang expression for a cigarette, is shortened to a cancer.

== Rhyming slang ==
Nadsat features Cockney rhyming slang.

Charlie transl. 'chaplain'
Charlie Chaplin's surname is a homophone to chaplain. In rhyming slang tradition, the rhyme itself is dropped, leaving Charlie.
Cutter transl. 'money'
Cutter rhymes with bread and butter, a wilful alteration of bread and honey 'money'.
Pretty polly transl. 'money'
Lolly is English slang for 'money'. The English folk song "Pretty Polly" rhymes with lolly, so in rhyming slang tradition, Burgess employs it as a synonym.
Hound-and-horny transl. 'corny'
Twenty to one transl. 'fun'
N.B. The teen hooligans in the novel use fun as code for 'gang violence'.

== See also ==
- Runglish
- Newspeak
- Verlan
- Polari
- List of nadsat words
- List of fictional languages

== General bibliography ==
- Aggeler, Geoffrey. "Pelagius and Augustine in the novels of Anthony Burgess". English Studies 55 (1974): 43–55. doi:10.1080/00138387408597602.
- Burgess, Anthony (1990). You've Had Your Time: Being the Second Part of the Confessions of Anthony Burgess. New York: Grove Weidenfeld. ISBN 978-0-8021-1405-1. OCLC 806307724.
- Gladsky, Rita K. "Schema Theory and Literary Texts: Anthony Burgess' Nadsat". Language Quarterly 30:1–2 (Winter–Spring 1992): 39–46.
- Saragi, T.; Nation, I. S. Paul; Meister, G. F. (1978). "Vocabulary Learning and Reading". System. 6 (2): 72–78. doi:10.1016/0346-251X(78)90027-1.
