= Alex (A Clockwork Orange) =

Fictional character from A Clockwork Orange

- A Clockwork Orange character
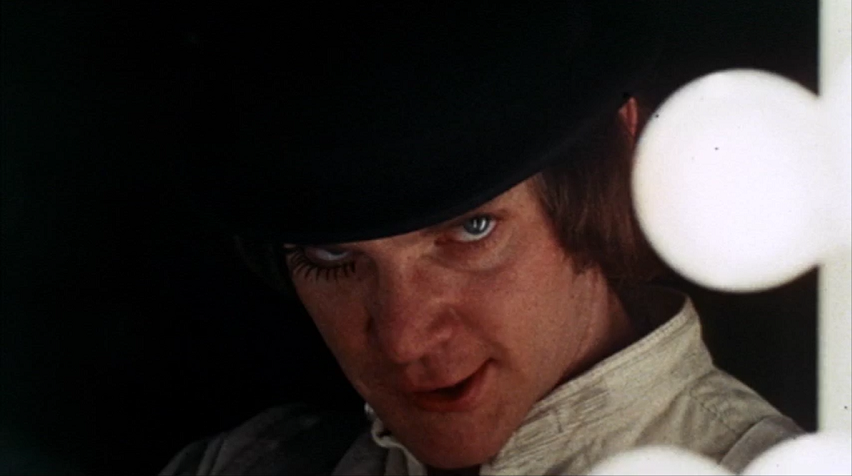
- Malcolm McDowell as Alex in the trailer of A Clockwork Orange (1971)
- First appearance: A Clockwork Orange (novel)
- Last appearance: A Clockwork Orange (film)
- Created by: Anthony Burgess
- Adapted by: Stanley Kubrick
- Portrayed by: Malcolm McDowell

In-universe information
- Full name: Alexander DeLarge (film only)
- Aliases: The Large (novel); Alex Burgess (birth name; film)
- Nationality: British

Alex is a fictional character and the protagonist in Anthony Burgess's novel A Clockwork Orange and Stanley Kubrick's film adaptation of the same name, in which he is played by Malcolm McDowell. In the book, Alex's surname is not stated. In the film, Kubrick chose it to be DeLarge, a reference to Alex calling himself Alexander The Large (the implication being that he possesses oversized genitals; as well as a punning reference to Alexander the Great) in the novel. Later on in the film, two newspaper articles print his name as "Alex Burgess", a reference to Burgess.

== Character overview ==
Alex is the narrator in the novel A Clockwork Orange. The character is portrayed as a thrill-seeking sociopath who robs, rapes, and assaults innocent people for his own amusement. Intellectually, he believes that such behaviour is morally wrong, saying that "you can't have a society with everybody behaving in my manner of the night". He nevertheless professes to be puzzled by the motivations of those who wish to reform him and others like him, saying that he would never interfere with their desire to be good; he simply "goes to the other shop".

Alex dresses in the "heighth [sic] of fashion", which consists of a waistcoat jacket with big shoulders and no lapels, a frilly off-white cravat as neckwear, tight black pants with a spider symbol on the crotch and a codpiece underneath, and big boots. He speaks Nadsat, a teenage slang created by author Anthony Burgess. The language is based on largely English and Russian words but also borrows from other sources such as Cockney rhyming slang, Romani speech, and schoolboy colloquialisms. His beverage of choice is milk spiked with various drugs, which he and his fellow gang members ("droogs") drink to fortify themselves for "ultraviolence". Alex is very fond of classical music, particularly Ludwig van Beethoven, whom he habitually refers to as "Lovely Ludwig Van". While listening to this music, he fantasises about endless rampages of rape, torture and slaughter. Alex's favourite melee weapon is a "cut-throat britva", or straight razor.

== Character biography ==
Alex lives with his parents in a block of flats in a dystopian England in which his brand of "ultraviolence" is common. At the age of 15, he is already a veteran of state reform institutions (in the film he is a few years older). He spends his days skipping school and listening to music; at night he terrorises the neighbourhood with his "droogs" Georgie, Pete and Dim. Despite being the youngest of his gang, Alex is the most intelligent and ruthless, so he designates himself as the leader. Georgie resents his high-handedness and begins plotting against him along with the rest of the gang. One night the gang breaks into a house and ties up and beats the owner, and Alex assaults and kills his wife by smashing her face with a bust of Beethoven (in the film it is a sculpture of a penis and testicles). As Alex flees from the house after hearing police sirens, Dim hits him with his chain (a milk bottle in the film) and the gang leaves him to be arrested. Alex is found guilty of murder and sentenced to 14 years in prison.

Over the next two years, Alex is a model prisoner, endearing himself to the prison chaplain by studying the Bible. He is especially fond of the passages in the Old Testament portraying torture and murder. Eventually, prison officials recommend him for the Ludovico Technique, an experimental forced re-education treatment designed to eliminate criminal impulses. During the treatment, prison doctors inject him with nausea-inducing drugs and make him watch films portraying murder, torture and rape. The treatment conditions him to associate violent thoughts and feelings with sickness. Alex is particularly affected by watching footage of Nazi war crimes set to Beethoven's Ninth Symphony (which Alex calls The Marvelous Ninth), one of his favourite pieces of music; as a result, he can no longer hear it without feeling desperately sick.

His sentence is commuted to time served and he is released. Once he returns to society, however, he finds that the treatment worked too well: any thought of violence brings him to his knees with pain, and he cannot defend himself. His parents have rented out his room, rendering him homeless. He is brutalised by his former victims and beaten by Billyboy, a former gang rival (in the film Georgie and Dim, who are now police officers, administer the beating).

Alex collapses in front of a house owned by a writer whom the government considers "subversive". The writer is one of the gang's victims, but he does not recognise Alex, who had been wearing a mask as he and his friends beat the man and gang-raped his wife, which the writer believes led to her death. When Alex tells him of his plight, the writer promises to help him. However, the writer recognises Alex's voice and speech patterns, after Alex inadvertently gives away knowledge of having been to the house before, and realises who he is (in the film he hears Alex singing "Singin' in the Rain", the very song he had sung while assaulting the couple). He drugs Alex and forces him to listen to Beethoven's Ninth Symphony, which causes Alex so much pain that he attempts suicide by jumping out of a window.

He survives but is badly injured and wakes up in a state hospital. His parents take him back and the government, smarting from bad publicity, gives him a well-paid job where he can channel his naturally violent tendencies against the enemies of the state. The effects of the Ludovico Technique have worn off, and Alex is his old, ultraviolent self again: "I was cured, all right".

While the film ends here, the novel features an additional chapter in which Alex, now eighteen, has outgrown his sociopathy. While his new "droogs" commit crime sprees, Alex sits them out as he has lost interest in violence. When he runs into Pete at a coffee shop and learns he got married, Alex begins to think about starting a family but worries that his children will inherit his violent tendencies.

== Reception ==
The American Film Institute rated Alex the 12th-greatest film villain of all time. Empire magazine selected Alex as the 42nd-greatest movie character of all time, and Wizard magazine rated Alex the 36th-greatest villain of all time. Malcolm McDowell's performance has been widely acclaimed by critics. McDowell was nominated for the Golden Globe Award for Best Actor – Motion Picture Drama, and some consider his failure to receive a Best Actor nomination at the Academy Awards a major snub. In 2008, his performance was ranked #100 on Premier magazine's "100 Greatest Performances of All Time."

In 2004, Vanessa Claire Smith won LA Weekly's Leading Female Performance award for her gender-bending performance in the stage production of A Clockwork Orange.

Manga artist Tetsuo Hara cited Alex as an influence on the character Souther, from his manga series Fist of the North Star.
