= Sister Mary Ignatius Explains It All for You =

Play by Christopher Durang

- Written by: Christopher Durang
- Original language: English

Premiere
- Date premiered: December 14, 1979
- Place premiered: Ensemble Studio Theatre

Sister Mary Ignatius Explains It All for You is a play by Christopher Durang.

== Productions ==
Sister Mary Ignatius Explains It All for You was first performed on December 14, 1979, at the Ensemble Studio Theatre in New York City. It was performed on a bill with one-act plays that included works by David Mamet, Marsha Norman, and Tennessee Williams. Durang, who was raised a Roman Catholic, won an Obie Award for the play as did Elizabeth Franz for her role as Sister Mary Ignatius.

In 1981, the play was presented again, this time on a double bill with a new Durang one-act, The Actor's Nightmare. Elizabeth Franz repeated her performance as Sister Mary, and in The Actor's Nightmare, she played the glamorous Sarah Siddons. Jeff Brooks played the accountant in that play who shows up at a theatre and is told he is the understudy and must go on; and in Sister Mary, he played the troubled alcoholic ex-student Aloysius. Others in the cast included Polly Draper, as Diane. the emotionally wounded girl who threatens Sister's life, Mary Catherine Wright as Philomena, the unwed mother, Timothy Landfield as Gary, the polite gay one, and young Mark Stefan as little Thomas. The double bill—featuring Sister Mary—was presented at Playwrights Horizons in New York City and was directed by Jerry Zaks. It was a critical success and moved to off-Broadway where it ran for two and a half years. As the run went on, other actresses took over the role of Sister: Nancy Marchand, Kathleen Chalfant, Mary Louise Wilson, Lynn Redgrave, and Patricia Gage.

In Los Angeles, Elizabeth Huddle and then Lynn Redgrave played Sister Mary. Thomas was played alternately by seven-year-old Chad Allen and 10-year-old Shane Butterworth. In San Francisco, Sister Mary was played by Cloris Leachman, Lynn Redgrave and Peggy Cass. Thomas was played by eight-year-old Ariel Shafir and eight-year-old Solomon Cheifer. In Los Angeles, the play was revived in 2004 at the ARK Theatre Company in a production directed by Susan Lee Johnson.

== Plot ==
At a Christmas lecture, a nun named Sister Mary Ignatius explains to the audience the basic tenets of Catholicism. She is assisted by her favorite student, seven-year-old Thomas. From time to time, she asks him catechism questions and gives him a cookie for every right answer. Her speech is interrupted when four of her former students – Gary Sullivan, Diane Symonds, Philomena Rostovich, and Aloysius Benheim – enter dressed as Saint Joseph, the Virgin Mary, and two halves of a camel. The four remind Sister that she had asked them to come perform the pageant they had performed when they were students in her class.

After the pageant, it becomes apparent that the four have strayed from Mary Ignatious's teaching: Diane has had two abortions (the first one from a rape at age 18); Philomena is an unwed mother; Aloysius is an alcoholic who beats his wife and contemplates suicide; Gary is gay. They reveal that they were never asked to come in and merely wanted Mary Ignatius, because they each have a reason for hating her: Aloysius was refused bathroom privileges frequently and now has bladder problems; Philomena was hit for being a poor student; Gary is there on behalf of his boyfriend Jeff; and Diane had believed Mary Ignatius's teachings until her mother died of breast cancer and she was raped the same day.

Diane reveals that she has brought a gun to kill Sister, something the other three were not aware of. Sister grabs a gun from behind her lectern and shoots Diane in self-defense. She also shoots Gary, proclaiming that she has sent him to heaven, as he'd been to confession earlier that day. She then points the gun at Aloysius, who needs to go to the bathroom, before handing it to Thomas so she can take a nap. The play ends with Thomas pointing the gun at Aloysius while explaining the perfections of God, Diane and Gary's dead bodies on the floor, and Sister asleep.

== Reception ==
Frank Rich of The New York Times wrote, "only a writer of real talent can write an angry play that remains funny and controlled even in its most savage moments. Sister Mary Ignatius Explains It All for You confirms that Christopher Durang is just such a writer". Lynn Trenning of Art Savant wrote that "the script is brilliant in its grasp of the ironic inconsistencies between Catholic doctrine and practical reality" while noting in her review of the original off Broadway production by the Off-Tryon Theatre Company that the lead's "too gentle demeanor failed to convince me she was the Sister Mary Ignatius who terrified children into obedience".

The play's stark criticism of Catholicism eventually led to controversy. Some conservative Catholics were offended by the play, and there were protests against it in St. Louis and Boston. In St. Louis, a bill was introduced that would penalize theatres that did not promise not to present plays people might find offensive, but after much publicity the bill died in committee.

Phil Donahue devoted a full episode of his national talk show to the controversy, focused on efforts to close the play in St. Louis. Video clips of the Los Angeles production were shown during the program, and ticket sales increased greatly in New York and Los Angeles after the program.

== Movie adaptation ==
The play was made into a movie, Sister Mary Explains It All, in 2001 for the Showtime network. It starred Diane Keaton, Laura San Giacomo, Jennifer Tilly, and Wallace Langham.
