= World's Dumbest... =

American reality comedy television series (2008–2014)

- Genre: Reality television; Comedy; Satire
- Starring: Various
- Narrated by: Chip Bolcik
- Country of origin: United States
- Original language: English
- No. of seasons: 16
- No. of episodes: 198 (list of episodes)

Production
- Running time: 40–60 minutes
- Production companies: Meetinghouse Productions, Inc.

Original release
- Network: TruTV
- Release: March 13, 2008 – March 2, 2014

truTV Presents: World's Dumbest... (formerly titled The Smoking Gun Presents: World's Dumbest..., and simply known as World's Dumbest...) is an American reality comedy television series produced by Meetinghouse Productions, Inc. and aired on truTV from 2008 to 2014.

Each episode features a ranked compilation of 20 video clips depicting unconventional or ill-advised behavior, often sourced from surveillance footage, eyewitness recordings, or public broadcasts, and includes commentary from featured celebrities or comedians. Segments are organized by thematic categories such as criminals, drivers, daredevils, partiers, and performers.

Starting on May 31, 2022, TBD (now Roar) is currently airing reruns, albeit heavily edited down to a half-hour.

== Overview ==
=== Early beginnings ===
Each episode of the series, originally only known as World's Dumbest Criminals, presented a comedic look at 20 half-witted and offbeat events recorded on camera and occasionally, on tape by 911 dispatchers.

As the series expanded to offer humorous looks at other subjects, the episodes were classified by themes, such as criminals (later outlaws), drivers (later motorheads), daredevils (later thrillseekers), partiers, and performers. Since Season 7, the series produced several episodes centering around weird and humorous Inventions. These episodes forgoed the usual World's Dumbest title and replaced it with World's Smartest; possibly with a sarcastic undertone.

Each featured commentary from comedians and writers such as Bryan Callen, Jared Logan, Chris Fairbanks, Kevin and Tom McCaffrey, and others.

Because the show's original focus had solely been on criminals bungling their acts of crime, commentary used to be provided mostly by celebrities known for their own past brushes with the law, including Danny Bonaduce, Leif Garrett, Tonya Harding, Todd Bridges, Daniel Baldwin, Frank Stallone and Gary Busey. These individuals continued to appear on the show after its focus expanded.

Sound effects and mock commentary are added to enhance the humor of the events. A cartoon storyboard may be added to make up for the lack of video.

In January 2011, the show renamed itself as truTV Presents: World's Dumbest..., dropping the "Smoking Gun", with the commentators' on-screen ID logos, the episode's opening title page, and background brightness adjusted as well, in the process. The new title page and show name was retroactively applied to reruns of older episodes.

=== Cast members ===
The series had a variety of celebrity cast members with backgrounds in acting, writing, journalism, improvisation, and comedy. Such cast members of the series included: Jaime Andrews, Mike Britt, Jessie Cantrell, Tom Shillue, Jared Logan, Harlan Coben, Natalie Desselle-Reid, Godfrey, Michel Bryant, Wesley Dening, Nick Di Paolo, John Enos, Daisy Gardner, Judy Gold, Billy Kimball, Ted Jessup, Vincent Pastore, Roger Lodge, Brad Loekle, Michael Loftus, Loni Love, Kevin McCaffrey, Chuck Nice, Chelsea Peretti, Marianne Sierk, Chris Strait, Mike Trainor, Brendon Walsh, Gilbert Gottfried, Dan Cummins, Rachel Feinstein, Jamie Lee, Malachi Nimmons Jr., Mike O'Gorman, Brooke Van Poppelen, Annie Lederman, Katlyn Carlson, Nate Craig, Chris Fairbanks, Mark Normand, Amanda Landry, Kate Wolff, Dustin Diamond, Omarosa Manigault Newman, Jo Koy, and The Greg Wilson. When the show originally focused on only showing criminals, they had several cast members who have had a background in criminal justice, legal journalism, law enforcement, investigation, and even figures of infamous crime stories. These included Amy Fisher, Judge David Young, Judge Maria Lopez, Michael Bryant, Ron Kuby, Mickey Sherman, Laurie Puhn, Alafair Burke, Tawya Young, Tom O'Riordan, Lauren Lake, Wally Zeins, Ken Stafford, Curtis Sliwa, Vinny Parco, Joe Brat, Bill Bastone, Andrew Goldberg, Mike Paul. Diane Dimond, Rikki Klieman, Savannah Guthrie, Dr. Jeff Gardere, Dr. Robi Ludwig, Dr. Belissa Vranich, Jack Ford, Jami Floyd, and Jean Casarez.

=== Special episodes ===
Some special episodes were produced following Season 9. Season 10 included "World's Dumbest Bracket Showdown", which featured some of the best clips from seasons past in a March Madness-style elimination tournament bracket, with cast members voting on which clip was better. Season 16 presented "World's Dumbest Only in America", which combined several different themed clips, all of which originated from the United States of America.

=== Finale ===
After 16 seasons comprising 197 episodes spanning over six years, the series aired its final episode on March 2, 2014, with no direct indication that the series had been cancelled. Rumors were circulating about a potential series revival being produced, with the show's unverified Twitter page posting a cryptic tweet on January 11, 2021 after nearly four years of inactivity, but no confirmation was made official from the show's original network, the show's producers, or any of the former cast members. TruTV has continued to air reruns of the show for over ten years, from Thursday through Saturday, and early Sunday mornings. However, TBD (now Roar) announced on their Facebook that they would start airing reruns on May 31, 2022. However, the majority of the episodes were awkwardly edited down to a half-hour and the TruTV references were muted and/or blurred out.

== Episodes ==
=== Season One (March 2008 – July 2008) ===
Season one of truTV Presents: World's Dumbest... premiered on March 13, 2008 on the TruTV network.

No. overall	No. in season	Title	Original release date
1	1	"World's Dumbest Criminals"	March 13, 2008
2	2	"World's Dumbest Criminals 2"	March 20, 2008
3	3	"World's Dumbest Criminals 3"	March 27, 2008
4	4	"World's Dumbest Criminals 4"	April 3, 2008
5	5	"World's Dumbest Drivers"	April 10, 2008
6	6	"World's Dumbest Drivers 2"	April 17, 2008
7	7	"World's Dumbest Daredevils"	June 5, 2008
8	8	"World's Dumbest Criminals 5"	June 12, 2008
9	9	"World's Dumbest Partiers"	June 19, 2008
10	10	"World's Dumbest Criminals 6"	June 26, 2008
11	11	"World's Dumbest Drivers 3"	July 3, 2008
12	12	"World's Dumbest Daredevils 2"	July 10, 2008
13	13	"World's Dumbest Competitions"	July 17, 2008
14	14	"World's Dumbest Criminals 7"	July 24, 2008
15	15	"World's Dumbest Competitions 2"	July 31, 2008

=== Season Two (October 2008 – December 2008) ===
No. overall	No. in season	Title	Original release date
16	1	"World's Dumbest Criminals 8"	October 9, 2008
17	2	"World's Dumbest Fans"	October 16, 2008
18	3	"World's Dumbest Drivers 4"	October 23, 2008
19	4	"World's Dumbest Daredevils 3"	October 30, 2008
20	5	"World's Dumbest Competitions 3"	November 6, 2008
21	6	"World's Dumbest Drivers 5"	November 13, 2008
22	7	"World's Dumbest Partiers 2"	November 20, 2008
23	8	"World's Dumbest Shoppers"	November 27, 2008
24	9	"World's Dumbest Animal Encounters"	December 4, 2008

=== Season Three (January 2009 – March 2009) ===
No. overall	No. in season	Title	Original release date
25	1	"World's Dumbest Criminals 10"	January 15, 2009
26	2	"World's Dumbest Drivers 7"	January 22, 2009
27	3	"World's Dumbest Daredevils 4"	February 12, 2009
28	4	"World's Dumbest Partiers 3"	February 19, 2009
29	5	"World's Dumbest Criminals 11"	February 26, 2009
30	6	"World's Dumbest Drivers 8"	March 5, 2009
31	7	"World's Dumbest Competitions 4"	March 12, 2009
32	8	"World's Dumbest Daredevils 5"	March 19, 2009

=== Season Four (December 2008 – April 2009) ===
No. overall	No. in season	Title	Original release date
33	1	"World's Dumbest Meltdowns"	December 11, 2008
34	2	"World's Dumbest Criminals 9"	December 18, 2008
35	3	"World's Dumbest Employees"	December 25, 2008
36	4	"World's Dumbest Record Breakers"	January 1, 2009
37	5	"World's Dumbest Drivers 6"	January 9, 2009
38	6	"World's Dumbest Criminals 12"	March 26, 2009
39	7	"World's Dumbest Drivers 9"	April 2, 2009
40	8	"World's Dumbest Partiers 4"	April 9, 2009
41	9	"World's Dumbest Performers"	April 16, 2009
42	10	"World's Dumbest Confrontations"	April 23, 2009

=== Season Five (June 2009 – August 2009) ===
No. overall	No. in season	Title	Original release date
43	1	"World's Dumbest Criminals 13"	June 4, 2009
44	2	"World's Dumbest Drivers 10"	June 11, 2009
45	3	"World's Dumbest Partiers 5"	June 18, 2009
46	4	"World's Dumbest Daredevils 6"	June 25, 2009
47	5	"World's Dumbest Record Breakers 2"	July 2, 2009
48	6	"World's Dumbest Competitions 5"	July 9, 2009
49	7	"World's Dumbest Criminals 14"	July 16, 2009
50	8	"World's Dumbest Drivers 11"	July 23, 2009
51	9	"World's Dumbest Partiers 6"	July 30, 2009
52	10	"World's Dumbest Daredevils 7"	August 6, 2009
53	11	"World's Dumbest Record Breakers 3"	August 13, 2009
54	12	"World's Dumbest Criminals 15"	August 20, 2009
55	13	"World's Dumbest Drivers 12"	August 27, 2009

=== Season Six (October 2009 – January 2010) ===
No. overall	No. in season	Title	Original release date
56	1	"World's Dumbest Criminals 16"	October 1, 2009
57	2	"World's Dumbest Drivers 13"	October 8, 2009
58	3	"World's Dumbest Performers 2"	October 22, 2009
59	4	"World's Dumbest Daredevils 8"	October 29, 2009
60	5	"World's Dumbest Partiers 7"	November 12, 2009
61	6	"World's Dumbest Criminals 17"	November 19, 2009
62	7	"World's Dumbest Drivers 14"	December 17, 2009
63	8	"World's Dumbest Record Breakers 4"	December 31, 2009
64	9	"World's Dumbest Partiers 8"	December 31, 2009
65	10	"World's Dumbest Brawlers"	January 7, 2010
66	11	"World's Dumbest Criminals 18"	January 7, 2010
67	12	"World's Dumbest Drivers 15"	January 25, 2010
68	13	"World's Dumbest Tourists"	January 14, 2010

=== Season Seven (December 2009 – April 2010) ===
No. overall	No. in season	Title	Original release date
69	1	"World's Dumbest Holidays"	December 24, 2009
70	2	"World's Dumbest Criminals 19"	January 28, 2010
71	3	"World's Dumbest Drivers 16"	January 4, 2010
72	4	"World's Smartest Inventions"	March 4, 2010
73	5	"World's Dumbest Daredevils 9"	February 18, 2010
74	6	"World's Dumbest Performers 3"	February 11, 2010
75	7	"World's Dumbest Lovers"	February 11, 2010
76	8	"World's Dumbest Brawlers 2"	March 11, 2010
77	9	"World's Dumbest Partiers 9"	March 18, 2010
78	10	"World's Dumbest Criminals 20"	March 25, 2010
79	11	"World's Dumbest Record Breakers 5"	April 1, 2010
80	12	"World's Dumbest Drivers 17"	April 8, 2010
81	13	"World's Dumbest Heroes"	April 15, 2010

=== Season Eight (June 2010 – September 2010) ===
No. overall	No. in season	Title	Original release date
82	1	"World's Dumbest Criminals 21"	June 10, 2010
83	2	"World's Dumbest Drivers 18"	June 17, 2010
84	3	"World's Dumbest Performers 4"	June 24, 2010
85	4	"World's Dumbest Brawlers 3"	July 8, 2010
86	5	"World's Dumbest Partiers 10"	July 22, 2010
87	6	"World's Dumbest Tourists 2"	July 29, 2010
88	7	"World's Dumbest Daredevils 10"	August 19, 2010
89	8	"World's Smartest Inventions 2"	September 9, 2010
90	9	"World's Dumbest Criminals 22"	August 5, 2010
91	10	"World's Dumbest Drivers 19"	August 26, 2010
92	11	"World's Dumbest Lovers 2"	July 15, 2010
93	12	"World's Dumbest Partiers 11"	September 2, 2010
94	13	"World's Dumbest Pranksters"	August 12, 2010

=== Season Nine (October 2010 – January 2011) ===
Halfway through Season 9, the show's title was changed from The Smoking Gun Presents: World's Dumbest.... to truTV Presents: World's Dumbest.....

No. overall	No. in season	Title	Original release date
95	1	"World's Dumbest Drivers 20"	October 21, 2010
96	2	"World's Dumbest Daredevils 11"	September 16, 2010
97	3	"World's Dumbest Brawlers 4"	October 28, 2010
98	4	"World's Dumbest Partiers 12"	November 4, 2010
99	5	"World's Dumbest Criminals 23"	November 11, 2010
100	6	"World's Dumbest Daredevils 12"	November 18, 2010
101	7	"World's Dumbest Brawlers 5"	December 2, 2010
102	8	"World's Dumbest Performers 5"	December 16, 2010
103	9	"World's Dumbest Drivers 21"	December 23, 2010
104	10	"World's Dumbest Criminals 24"	December 30, 2010
105	11	"World's Dumbest Partiers 13"	January 6, 2011
106	12	"World's Smartest Inventions 3"	January 13, 2011
107	13	"World's Dumbest Performers 6"	January 20, 2011

=== Season Ten (January 2011 – May 2011) ===
No. overall	No. in season	Title	Original release date
108	1	"World's Dumbest Brawlers 6"	January 27, 2011
109	2	"World's Dumbest Drivers 22"	February 3, 2011
110	3	"World's Dumbest Thrillseekers"	February 10, 2011
111	4	"World's Dumbest Criminals 25"	February 17, 2011
112	5	"World's Dumbest Record Breakers 6"	February 14, 2011
113	6	"World's Dumbest Partiers 14"	March 3, 2011
114	7	"World's Dumbest Motorheads"	March 10, 2011
115	8	"World's Dumbest Outlaws"	May 5, 2011
116	9	"World's Dumbest Performers 7"	March 24, 2011
117	10	"World's Dumbest Brawlers 7"	April 7, 2011
118	11	"World's Dumbest Partiers 15"	April 14, 2011
119	12	"World's Dumbest Hillbillies"	April 21, 2011
120	13	"World's Dumbest Bracket Showdown"	March 31, 2011

=== Season Eleven (June 2011 – September 2011) ===
No. overall	No. in season	Title	Original release date
121	1	"World's Dumbest Motorheads 2"	June 9, 2011
122	2	"World's Dumbest Thrillseekers 2"	June 16, 2011
123	3	"World's Dumbest Performers 8"	June 23, 2011
124	4	"World's Dumbest Outlaws 2"	September 1, 2011
125	5	"World's Dumbest Brawlers 8"	July 7, 2011
126	6	"World's Dumbest Partiers 16"	July 14, 2011
127	7	"World's Dumbest Thrillseekers 3"	July 21, 2011
128	8	"World's Dumbest Lovers 3"	July 28, 2011
129	9	"World's Dumbest Motorheads 3"	August 4, 2011
130	10	"World's Dumbest Performers 9"	August 11, 2011
131	11	"World's Dumbest Hillbillies 2"	August 18, 2011
132	12	"World's Smartest Inventions 5"	August 25, 2011
133	13	"World's Smartest Inventions 4"	June 2, 2011

=== Season Twelve (October 2011 – February 2012) ===
No. overall	No. in season	Title	Original release date
134	1	"World's Dumbest Outlaws 3"	October 27, 2011
135	2	"World's Dumbest Performers 10"	November 3, 2011
136	3	"World's Dumbest Motorheads 4"	November 10, 2011
137	4	"World's Dumbest Outlaws 4"	November 17, 2011
138	5	"World's Dumbest Brawlers 9"	December 1, 2011
139	6	"World's Dumbest Pranksters 2"	December 15, 2011
140	7	"World's Dumbest Partiers 17"	December 22, 2011
141	8	"World's Dumbest Thrillseekers 4"	December 29, 2011
142	9	"World's Dumbest Outlaws 5"	January 5, 2012
143	10	"World's Dumbest Hillbillies 3"	January 12, 2012
144	11`	"World's Dumbest Partiers 18"	January 19, 2012
145	12	"World's Dumbest Brawlers 10"	January 26, 2012
146	13	"World's Dumbest Motorheads 5"	February 2, 2012

=== Season Thirteen (February 2012 – May 2012) ===
No. overall	No. in season	Title	Original release date
147	1	"World's Dumbest Thrillseekers 5"	February 9, 2012
148	2	"World's Dumbest Brawlers 11"	February 16, 2012
149	3	"World's Dumbest Motorheads 6"	March 1, 2012
150	4	"World's Dumbest Performers 11"	March 22, 2012
151	5	"World's Dumbest Outlaws 6"	March 8, 2012
152	6	"World's Smartest Inventions 7"	May 31, 2012
153	7	"World's Dumbest Partiers 19"	April 12, 2012
154	8	"World's Dumbest Brawlers 12"	April 5, 2012
155	9	"World's Dumbest Performers 12"	April 19, 2012
156	10	"World's Dumbest Outlaws 7"	April 26, 2012
157	11	"World's Dumbest Hillbillies 4"	May 10, 2012
158	12	"World's Dumbest Thrillseekers 6"	May 24, 2012
159	13	"World's Smartest Inventions 6"	February 23, 2012

=== Season Fourteen (June 2012 – September 2012) ===
No. overall	No. in season	Title	Original release date
160	1	"World's Dumbest Motorheads 7"	June 7, 2012
161	2	"World's Dumbest Brawlers 13"	June 14, 2012
162	3	"World's Dumbest Thrillseekers 7"	June 14, 2012
163	4	"World's Smartest Inventions 8"	June 21, 2012
164	5	"World's Dumbest Dummies"	June 21, 2012
165	6	"World's Dumbest Outlaws 8"	July 12, 2012
166	7	"World's Dumbest Performers 13"	July 19, 2012
167	8	"World's Dumbest Thrillseekers 8"	July 26, 2012
168	9	"World's Dumbest Partiers 20"	August 2, 2012
169	10	"World's Dumbest Hillbillies 5"	August 9, 2012
170	11	"World's Smartest Inventions 9"	August 16, 2012
171	12	"World's Dumbest Dummies 2"	September 6, 2012
172	13	"World's Dumbest Brawlers 14"	September 13, 2012

=== Season Fifteen (February 2013 – August 2013) ===
No. overall	No. in season	Title	Original release date
173	1	"World's Dumbest Performers 14"	February 28, 2013
174	2	"World's Dumbest Motorheads 8"	March 8, 2013
175	3	"World's Smartest Inventions 10"	March 15, 2013
176	4	"World's Dumbest Thrillseekers 9"	March 28, 2013
177	5	"World's Dumbest Outlaws 9"	April 4, 2013
178	6	"World's Dumbest Motorheads 9"	April 11, 2013
179	7	"World's Dumbest Performers 15"	April 18, 2013
180	8	"World's Dumbest Partiers 21"	May 28, 2013
181	9	"World's Dumbest Thrillseekers 10"	June 13, 2013
182	10	"World's Dumbest Motorheads 10"	June 20, 2013
183	11	"World's Dumbest Performers 16"	June 27, 2013
184	12	"World's Smartest Inventions 11"	July 11, 2013
185	13	"World's Dumbest Partiers 22"	July 18, 2013
186	14	"World's Dumbest Pranksters 3"	August 8, 2013
187	15	"World's Dumbest Show-Offs"	August 15, 2013
188	16	"World's Dumbest TV Shows"	August 22, 2013

=== Season Sixteen (October 2013 – March 2014) ===
No. overall	No. in season	Title	Original release date
189	1	"World's Dumbest Hotshots"	October 10, 2013
190	2	"World's Smartest Inventions 12"	October 17, 2013
191	3	"World's Dumbest Motorheads 11"	January 5, 2014
192	4	"World's Dumbest Show-Offs 2"	January 12, 2014
193	5	"World's Dumbest Thrillseekers 11"	January 19, 2014
194	6	"World's Dumbest Partiers 23"	January 26, 2014
195	7	"World's Dumbest Pranksters 4"	February 9, 2014
196	8	"World's Smartest Inventions 13"	February 16, 2014
197	9	"World's Dumbest Only in America"	February 23, 2014
198	10	"World's Dumbest Performers 17"	March 2, 2014
