= Chip Bolcik =

American actor

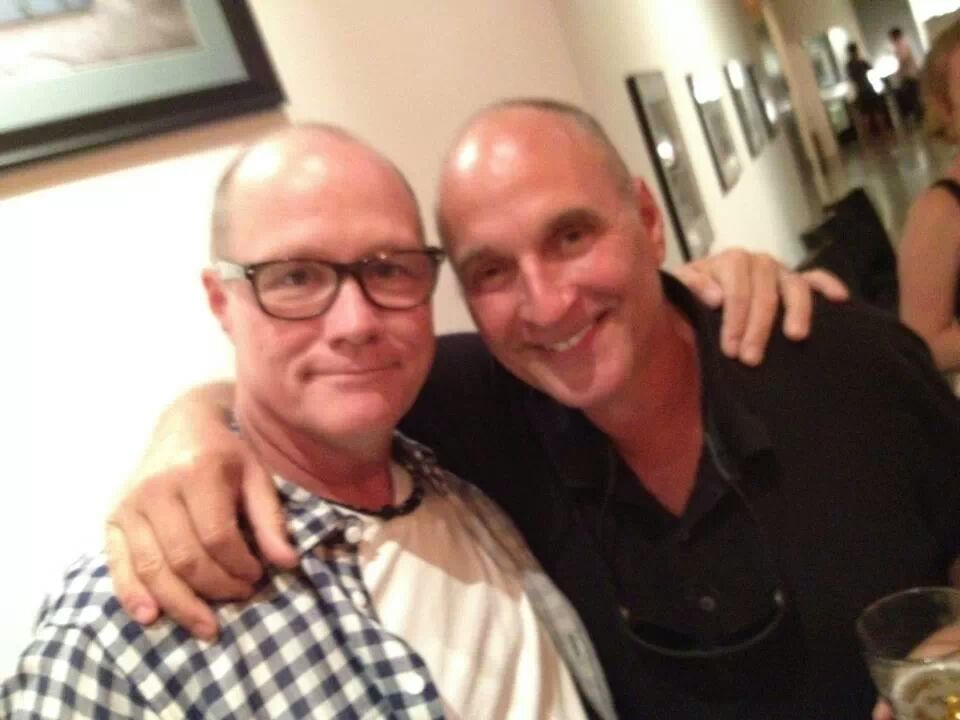
- David Cowgill (Left) and Chip Bolcik (Right)
- Born: March 17, 1958 (age 67)
- Occupation: Voice artist
- Years active: 1980–present

Chip Bolcik (/ˈbɔːlsɪk/ BAWL-sik; born March 17, 1958) is an American voice-over announcer and narrator. He got his start in 1980 when one of his friends told an advertising executive about the silly messages Bolcik made on his answering machine. The executive called Bolcik's answering machine and left a message asking if he did voice-overs. Since then, Bolcik has done voice-overs for thousands of products. He is best known for narrating the TruTV series World's Dumbest..., which ran from 2008 to 2014.
