= French Stewart =

American actor (born 1964)

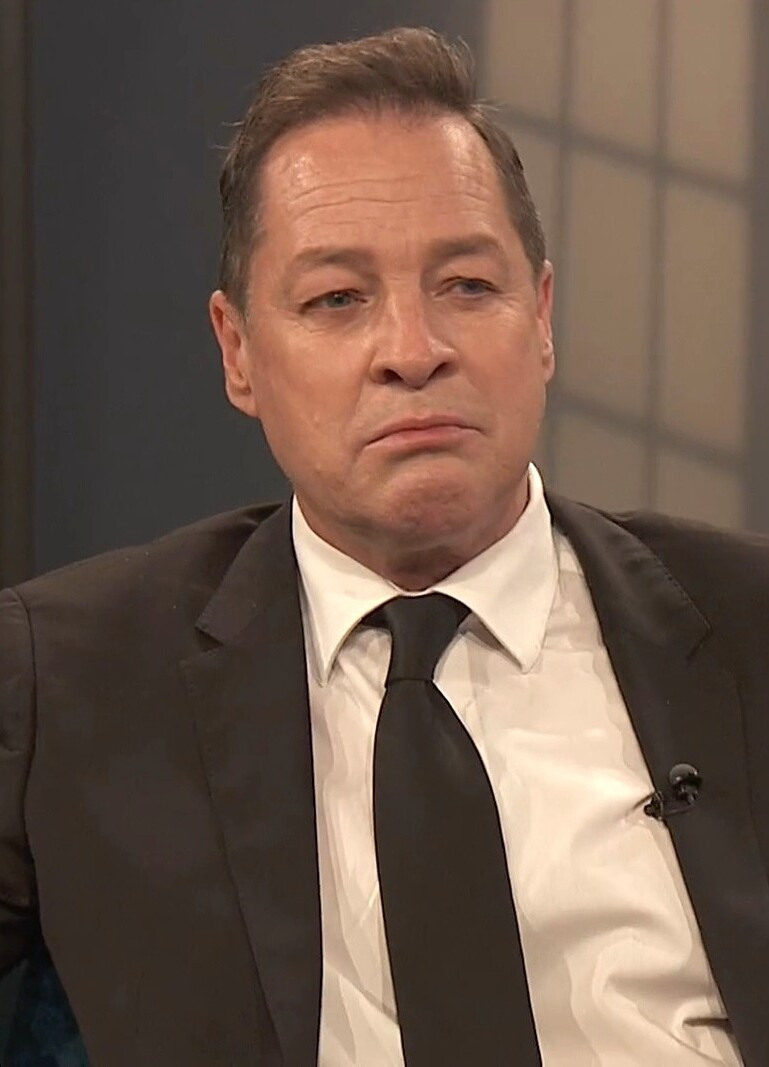
- Stewart in 2022
- Born: Milton French Stewart; February 20, 1964 (age 62); Albuquerque, New Mexico, U.S.
- Occupation: Actor
- Years active: 1985–present
- Known for: 3rd Rock from the Sun; Inspector Gadget 2; Mom
- Spouses: Katherine LaNasa (m. 1998; div. 2009); Vanessa Claire Perkins (m. 2011)
- Children: 1

Milton French Stewart (born February 20, 1964) is an American actor. He played Harry Solomon on the NBC sitcom 3rd Rock from the Sun, Inspector Gadget in the superhero comedy film Inspector Gadget 2 and Chef Rudy on the CBS sitcom Mom.

== Early life and education ==
Stewart was born in Albuquerque, New Mexico on February 20, 1964. His mother was a homemaker, and his stepfather was a microfilm technician. He attended Del Norte High School and also studied at the American Academy of Dramatic Arts.

== Career ==
Stewart toured in regional theatre for seven years before breaking into television with the role of Razor Dee, a spaced-out DJ on the final season of The New WKRP in Cincinnati in 1992. He earned his Screen Actors Guild card while working for Hanna-Barbera's Shakey Quakey tour, but was later released for removing the head of his costume in front of children. In 1996, he was cast on 3rd Rock from the Sun, which lasted for six seasons, and where Stewart was noted for his talents at physical comedy and his characteristic "squinting" facial expression. During 3rd Rock's height of popularity, he appeared in numerous commercials and as a spokesperson for the beverage Clamato.

Stewart's major film credits include Stargate (1994) as Lieutenant Louis Ferretti, Leaving Las Vegas (1995), The Poison Tasters (1995), Magic Island (1995) Glory Daze (1996), McHale's Navy (1997), Love Stinks (1999), Clockstoppers (2002) as Earl Doppler, and Wedding Daze (2004) as Nathan Bennett IV. His animation credits include the voice of Bob in the short-lived animated series God, the Devil and Bob (2000), and Disney's animated series Hercules (1998) as Icarus.

Since 3rd Rock ended in 2001, Stewart has appeared in a number of minor roles, mainly in situation comedies such as Just Shoot Me!, Becker, The Drew Carey Show, Less than Perfect and That '70s Show (from the creators of 3rd Rock). He also starred in the WB show Charmed as a genie at the end of season 2, and also appeared in NCIS. He has starred in comedy films, with major roles in the direct-to-video films Home Alone 4 (2002) and Inspector Gadget 2 (2003). He guest-starred in the "Run Away Runway" episode of Disney's animated series Phineas and Ferb as fashion designer Gaston Le Mode (2008).

Stewart has appeared on MADtv and guest-starred in the Seinfeld episode "The Opposite". He can also be seen on the I Love The... series on VH1. He was an executive producer for Has Anyone Seen My Baby?, a drama on the Lifetime network that portrayed the life of a woman who lost her child on an African safari in the early 1970s. He also appeared as the "weird guy" office temp on NewsRadio.

Stewart produced and co-starred in the dual role of Queen Victoria and Sigmund Freud in Watson: The Last Great Tale of the Legendary Sherlock Holmes at the Sacred Fools Theater Company, where he is a member, and was co-artistic director of its 2012–2013 season. In May and June 2012, he appeared at Sacred Fools as Buster Keaton in the original play Stoneface: The Rise and Fall and Rise of Buster Keaton, written by his wife, Vanessa Claire Stewart. In 2011, he also voiced Richard De Longpre on Allen Gregory.

On April 20, 2013, Stewart was a special guest on the NickHD television show Marvin Marvin, playing Marvin's Uncle Steve. In 2013, he joined the CBS series Mom as series regular Chef Rudy. He has also guest-starred on the TV show The Middle as Principal Cameron (2013 to May 13, 2015).

== Personal life ==
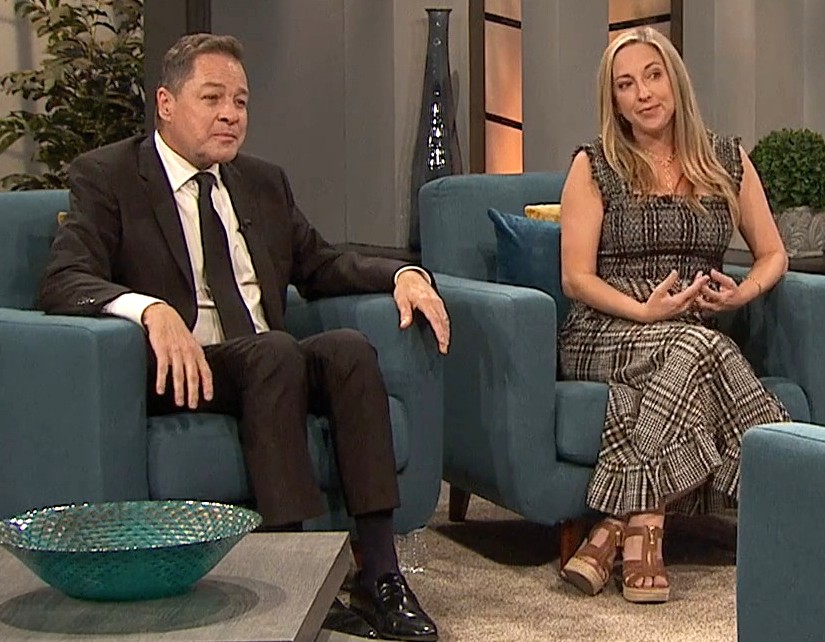
French and Vanessa Stewart in 2022

Stewart married actress Katherine LaNasa on May 19, 1998, whom he met when she had a guest appearance on a 1996 episode of 3rd Rock from the Sun. They divorced in December 2009. Stewart married actress Vanessa Claire Perkins in June 2011. Their daughter was born on June 28, 2013. They reside in Atlanta, Georgia.

== Filmography ==
=== Film ===
| Year | Title | Role | Notes |
|---|---|---|---|
| 1994 | Stargate | Lieutenant Louis Ferretti | |
| 1995 | Leaving Las Vegas | Businessman #2 | |
| 1995 | Glory Daze | Dennis | |
| 1995 | Magic Island | Supperstein | |
| 1996 | Broken Arrow | I.R. Crewman | |
| 1997 | McHale's Navy | Happy | |
| 1999 | Dick | The Interviewer | |
| 1999 | Love Stinks | Seth Winnick | |
| 1999 | Bartok the Magnificent | Oble | Voice |
| 2000 | Murder at the Cannes Film Festival | Nathan Booth | Television film |
| 2002 | Home Alone 4: Taking Back the House | Marv Murchins | Television film |
| 2002 | Clockstoppers | Earl Dopler | |
| 2003 | Inspector Gadget 2 | Inspector Gadget | Direct-to-video |
| 2005 | Duck | Jumper | |
| 2005 | My Name Is... | Jason Scott | Short film |
| 2007 | If I Had Known I Was a Genius | Public school principal | |
| 2007 | The Flock | Haynes Ownby | |
| 2008 | Surveillance | Officer Jim Conrad | |
| 2008 | Dog Gone | Blackie | |
| 2009 | Give 'em Hell, Malone | Frankie the Crooner | |
| 2009 | Opposite Day | Godfrey | |
| 2010 | The Assignment | Mr. Price | |
| 2011 | Convincing Clooney | HW | |
| 2011 | Beverly Hills Chihuahua 2 | Beverly Hills Dog Show Commentator/Dog Show Judge #2 | |
| 2012 | Christopher George Gardner: A Life In Drinking The Knoxville Years | Christopher Gardner | Released |
| 2013 | 30 Nights of Paranormal Activity with the Devil Inside the Girl with the Dragon Tattoo | Herb Rosti | Direct-to-video |
| 2013 | Rain from Stars | Virgil | |
| 2014 | The Little Rascals Save the Day | Bank Officer | Direct-to-video |
| 2019 | More Beautiful for Having Been Broken | Rodney | |
| 2021 | Queen Bees | Ken DeNardo | |
| 2024 | Bob Trevino Likes It | Robert | |
| 2025 | Killing Mary Sue | Vladyslav Volkov | |

=== Television ===
| Year | Title | Role | Notes |
|---|---|---|---|
| 1992 | The New WKRP in Cincinnati | Razor Dee | Main role (season 2) |
| 1994 | The Larry Sanders Show | Intern | Episode: "Would You Do Me a Favor?" |
| 1994 | Seinfeld | Manager | Episode: "The Opposite" |
| 1996–2001 | 3rd Rock from the Sun | Harry Solomon | Main role, 139 episodes |
| 1997 | NewsRadio | Brent | Episode: "Mistake" |
| 1997 | Caroline in the City | Stu | Episode: "Caroline and the Long Shot" |
| 1998–1999 | Hercules | Icarus | Voice, main role |
| 1998 | Just Shoot Me! | Steven | Episode: "Puppetmaster" |
| 2000 | CinderElmo | Human Prince | |
| 2000 | Charmed | Genie | Episode: "Be Careful What You Witch For" |
| 2000–2001 | Buzz Lightyear of Star Command | Rentwhistle Swack | Voice, 3 episodes |
| 2000–2011 | God, the Devil, and Bob | Bob Alman | Voice, 13 episodes |
| 2001 | That '70s Show | Daniel | 1 episode |
| 2002 | Ally McBeal | Michael Walker | Episode: "Blowin' in the Wind" |
| 2002 | Becker | Jim Reynolds | Episode: "Papa Does Preach" |
| 2003–2005 | Less Than Perfect | Gene Schmidtline | 3 episodes |
| 2004 | The Drew Carey Show | Buddy | 1 episode |
| 2004 | Wedding Daze | Nathan Bennett IV | Television film |
| 2004 | CSI: Crime Scene Investigation | Alien Pastor | Episode: "Viva Las Vegas" |
| 2005 | The New Partridge Family | Reuben Kincaid | Pilot |
| 2005 | The Entertainment Weekly Guide: Guilty Pleasures | Host | |
| 2006 | Misconceptions | Stewart / Horace | 7 episodes |
| 2006 | Pepper Dennis | Dr. Crimmons | Episode: "Frat Boys May Lose Their Manhood" |
| 2007 | Two Dreadful Children | | |
| 2007 | Subs | Principal Delahey | Unsold television pilot |
| 2007 | Pandemic | Dr. Carl Ratner | |
| 2007 | Bones | Isaac Horn | Episode: "The Girl in the Gator" |
| 2007 | The Closer | Gary Evans | 3 episodes |
| 2008 | Phineas and Ferb | Gaston Le Mode | Voice, episode: "Run Away Runway" |
| 2008 | Pushing Daisies | Woolsey Nicholls | Episode: "Bzzzzzzzzz!" |
| 2008 | Happy Campers | | |
| 2008 | Cavemen | Mr. Busby | Episode: "Caveman Holiday" |
| 2009 | Imagination Movers | Teacher | Episode: "Nina Gets the Giggles" |
| 2010 | The Horrible Terrible Misadventures of David Atkins | David Atkins | 5 episodes |
| 2010 | Castle | Zach Robinson | Episode: "The Late Shaft" |
| 2010 | Zeke and Luther | Garm Garoosh | Episode: "Luther Waffles and the Skateboard of Doom" |
| 2010 | True Jackson, VP | Donald the Delightful | Episode: "True Kiss" |
| 2010 | Private Practice | Kevin Mason | Episode: "Take Two" |
| 2010 | Days of Our Lives | Keith | 2 episodes |
| 2010, 2012 | The Penguins of Madagascar | Cecil | Voice, 2 episodes |
| 2011 | Stargate Universe | Dr. Andrew Covel | Episode: "Alliances" |
| 2011 | Pound Puppies | Zoltron | Voice, episode: "Zoltron" |
| 2011 | Allen Gregory | Richard De Longpre | Voice |
| 2012 | Community | Vinnie, a French Stewart impersonator | Episode: "Contemporary Impressionists" |
| 2012 | Psych | Whip Chatterly | Episode: "Autopsy Turvy" |
| 2012 | Rise of the Zombies | Dr. Arnold | |
| 2013–2015, 2017 | The Middle | Principal Cameron | 4 episodes |
| 2013–2016, 2018–20 | Mom | Chef Rudy | Main role (seasons 1–2); recurring role (seasons 6–7); guest (seasons 3, 5, 8); 30 episodes |
| 2013 | The Birthday Boys | Himself | Episode: "Goofy Roofers" |
| 2015 | Secrets and Lies | John Patrick | 4 episodes |
| 2016 | 2 Broke Girls | Mr. Bronski | Episode: "And the Sophie Doll" |
| 2016 | Lego Star Wars: The Freemaker Adventures | N-3R0 | Voice, episode: "The Maker of Zoh" |
| 2017–2018 | NCIS | Paul Triff | 2 episodes |
| 2017 | Trial & Error | Sebastian Rappaport | Episode: "Chapter 12: The Defense Rests" |
| 2017 | Hell's Kitchen | Himself | Guest diner; episode: "Raising the Bar" |
| 2018 | K.C. Undercover | Barney Feffer | Episode: "Twin it to Win it" |
| 2018 | Roseanne | Dean | Episode: "Knee Deep" |
| 2019 | Deadly Class | Scorpio Slasher | 2 episodes |
| 2019 | No Good Nick | Gerard | Episode: "The Charity Mugger" |
| 2021 | Leverage: Redemption | Derec Springer | Episode: "The Card Game Job" |
| 2022 | How We Roll | Jacob Powell | Episode: "The Sponsor" |
| 2022 | Raven's Home | Indigo | Episode: "Retreat Yourself" |
| 2023 | Will Trent | Lenny Broussard | 3 episodes |
| 2026 | The Neighborhood | Casper | 1 episode |

== Awards and nominations ==
Daytime Emmy Award

- 2000: Nominated for Outstanding Performer in an Animated Program playing Icarus on Hercules

Ovation Awards

- 2011: Nominated for Lead Actor in a Play for the role of Nate in the Sacred Fools Theatre Company production of "Voice Lessons"
- 2011: Nominated for Featured Actor in a Play for the role of Freud/Queen Victoria in the Sacred Fools Theatre Company production of "Watson – The Last Great Tale of the Legendary Sherlock Holmes"
