= Vanessa Claire Stewart =

American actress, producer, and writer (born 1976)

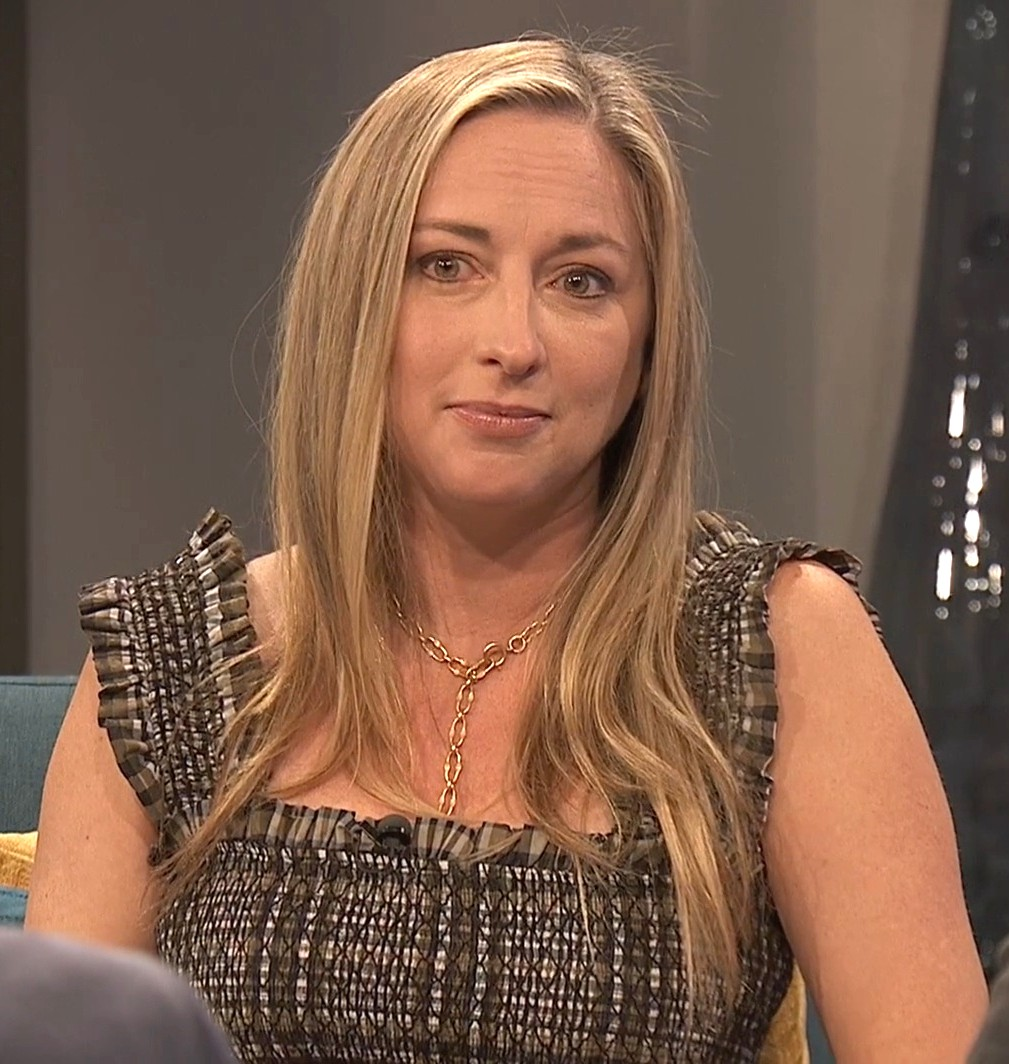
- Stewart in 2022
- Born: Vanessa Claire Perkins; October 15, 1976 (age 50); New Orleans, Louisiana, U.S.
- Education: Webster Conservatory for the Performing Arts; Oxford School of Drama
- Occupations: Actress, writer, producer
- Years active: 1999–present
- Spouses: Lance Smith (m. 1999; div. 2005) French Stewart (m. 2011)
- Children: 1

Vanessa Claire Stewart (née Perkins; born October 15, 1976) is an American actress, producer, and writer.

== Early life and education ==
Born in New Orleans, Louisiana, Stewart attended the Webster Conservatory for the Performing Arts in St. Louis, Missouri. After graduating, she was admitted to the Oxford School of Drama in the United Kingdom.

== Career ==
In 2004, Stewart received an LA Weekly Theatre Award for Best Leading Female Performance, for her gender-bending portrayal of Alex in Los Angeles director Brad Mays' controversial multi-media production of Anthony Burgess's A Clockwork Orange at the ARK Theatre Company in 2003. She also directed the popular Return to the Forbidden Planet while at ARK.

In 2008, she co-wrote Louis and Keely: Live at the Sahara with actor Jake Broder for Sacred Fools Theatre. The show became an overnight success and was discovered by filmmaker Taylor Hackford. Hackford later became director of the show and brought Louis and Keely to a successful 8 month run at the Geffen Playhouse in 2009. While at the Geffen, Stewart met her future husband actor French Stewart in the green room before his performance in "Matthew Modine Saves the Alpacas".

In 2010, she received an LA Weekly Theatre Award, a Garland and an Ovation Award for Louis and Keely Live at the Sahara, for her portrayal of legendary jazz vocalist Keely Smith.

In 2012, Stewart wrote Stoneface for Sacred Fools Theater Company, about the life of Buster Keaton, starring her husband French Stewart. Stoneface won the 2013 LA Weekly award for best production. Stoneface appeared in the 2013–2014 season at Pasadena Playhouse.

In 2015, thanks to theater producer Hershey Felder, Louis and Keely: Live at the Sahara moved to a commercial run in Chicago at the Royal George Theater starring Tony Award winner Anthony Crivello as Louis Prima. The run officially began April 9 and closed eight weeks later on May 17. An additional run at Laguna Playhouse was announced for February 2016.

In 2019, her original musical about serial killer HH Holmes entitled Deadly premiered at Sacred Fools Theatre Company. Written by Stewart and composer Ryan Johnson, the musical later moved to Webster Conservatory for further development and premiered a new revision online in December 2020 due to Coronavirus restrictions on live performances.

Stewart has appeared in various film and television productions, including Chase the Slut, Shakespeare's Merchant, Joan of Arcadia, Rules of Engagement, and The List.

== Personal life ==
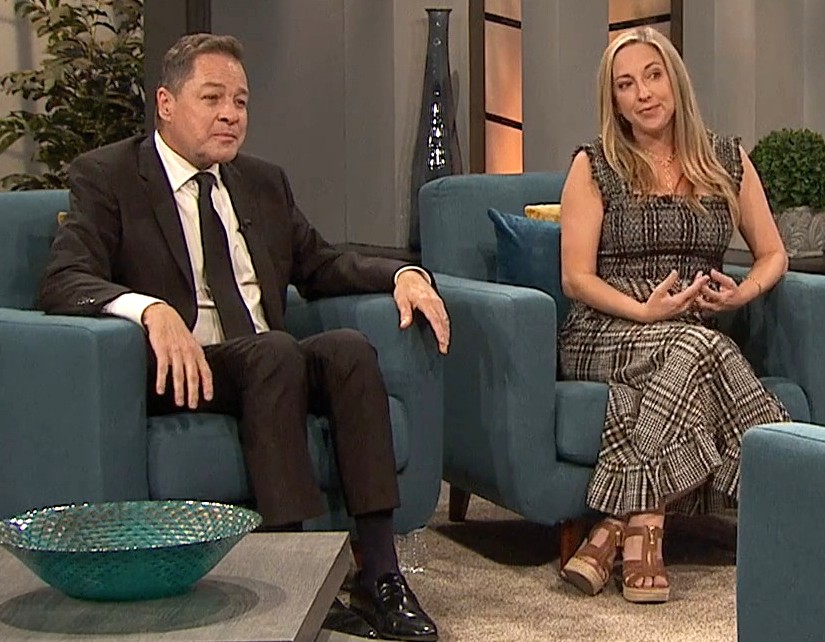
French Stewart and Vanessa Stewart in 2022

She moved to Los Angeles in 1999 where she met and married her first husband, Lance Arthur Smith. They divorced in 2005. In 2009, while performing at the Geffen Playhouse, she met actor French Stewart. They married in 2011 and had a daughter, Helene Claire, in 2013. Once remarried, she took the surname Stewart. Stewart lives in Los Angeles, California.

== Filmography ==
=== Film ===
Year	Title	Role	Notes
1999	V-World Matrix	Nurse	Direct-to-video
2002	The Coven	Grandma Grace	Direct-to-video
2003	Shakespeare's Merchant	Jessica	
2010	Chase the Slut	Chase	
2016	Who Was Buffalo Bill?	Rose Alten	
2017	Alex & the List	Carol	

=== Television ===
Year	Title	Role	Notes
2004	Joan of Arcadia	Surly Punk Girl	Episode: "Wealth of Nations"
2010	Rules of Engagement	Maya	Episode: "The Score"
2010–2011	Everyone Counts	Fae	4 episodes
2011	Mega Python vs. Gatoroid	Party Goer	Television film

== Awards and nominations ==
Ovation Awards

- 2009: Won the award for Lead Actress in a Musical for the role of Keely Smith in "Louis & Keely, Live at the Sahara"
- 2010 Ovation Awards: Award for Best Musical for the Geffen Playhouse production of "Louis and Keely: Live at the Sahara".

Los Angeles Drama Critics Circle Awards

- 2009 Production of the Year: Louis and Keely: Live at the Sahara

LA Weekly Awards

- Best Actress award for her role as Alex in ARK Theatre Company's 'A Clockwork Orange'
- 2013 LA Weekly Awards: Production of the year: Stoneface at Pasadena Playhouse
