= Brad Loekle =

American comedian (born 1978)

Brad Loekle (born May 18, 1978) is an American comedian. He started performing comedy routines after receiving a degree at the University of the Arts in Philadelphia, Pennsylvania, where he majored in acting and music.

== Career ==
From 2008 to 2014, he was one of the commentators on TruTV's World's Dumbest..., a humorous reality television series. Loekle's voice has been heard on Sirius XM Radio's Morning Jolt, in which he served as a guest co-host. He is also a columnist for the Key West Gay Rag, which is a monthly publication for the LGBT community in Key West, Florida. In his columns, he talks about political issues affecting the gay community as well as his sexual escapades. When he is not writing about himself in the Key West Gay Rag, he opens up to his readers listening to what they have to say. He calls this section of the column, "Ask Nana".

Loekle is a regular at the clubs in New York City. He attends clubs such as Carolines, Comix, and Gotham Comedy Club. He has also toured the country and performed at several venues such as night clubs, casinos, colleges, and resorts.

In addition, he is a frequent performer on cruise ships and in resorts chartered by Atlantis Events.

== Personal information ==
Loekle is originally from Upstate New York.
