= Toni Press-Coffman =

American dramatist

Toni Press-Coffman is an American playwright, living and working in Tucson, Arizona. She was born and raised in New York City.

== Career overview ==
Toni Press-Coffman is the recipient of several national playwriting awards. Her play Touch has been produced at the Humana Festival at Actors Theatre of Louisville, and the Theatre of N.O.T.E. in Los Angeles, as well as other theatres throughout the United States and Europe. Another play, That Slut! has received favorable notices. In 2000, Press-Coffman was awarded an NEA/TCG Playwright Residency Award. Additionally, she was one of 12 playwrights selected to participate in the 1995 Eugene O'Neill National Playwrights Conference.

Toni Press-Coffman has received fellowships and awards from the California Arts Council, the Arizona State Playwriting Contest, the Negro Ensemble Theatre Company, the Invisible Theatre, Wisconsin Women in the Arts, the Rockefeller Foundation, the Peninsula Community Foundation (which later merged with Community Foundation Silicon Valley to become the Silicon Valley Community Foundation), and the Shubert Foundation. She has a BA in Playwriting from UCLA and an MA in Theatre and Film from the University of Connecticut, and has taught Playwriting at several major universities.

Toni Press-Coffman is Literary Coordinator of Borderlands Theatre in Tucson, where she lives, writes, teaches and acts. She is also a member of the Dramatists Guild and, as Literary Committee Chair, serves on the Executive Committee of the National New Play Network. She received a bachelor's degree from the University of Connecticut in 1976.
