= Kill Me, Deadly =

- Film poster
- Directed by: Darrett Sanders
- Written by: Bill Robens (play and screenplay)
- Story by: Bill Robens
- Produced by: Kelsey Hendrix; Phinneas Kiyomura; Dean Lemont; John Money; Bill Robens; Darrett Sanders; Wendi West
- Starring: Kirsten Vangsness; Dean Lemont; Lesley-Anne Down; Joe Mantegna
- Cinematography: Nicholas Trikonis
- Edited by: Darrett Sanders
- Music by: Bill Newlin
- Distributed by: Indican Pictures
- Release date: February 13, 2015 (Hollywood Reel Independent Film Festival)
- Running time: 100 minutes
- Country: United States
- Language: English

Kill Me, Deadly is a 2015 American historical fiction neo-noir mystery black comedy film starring Kirsten Vangsness, Lesley-Anne Down, and Joe Mantegna. It is based on a 2009 play by Bill Robens.

== Plot ==
In 1947, hard-boiled detective Charlie Nickels' client is murdered and her priceless diamond stolen. The investigation forces him to do the one thing he swore to never do again: trust a dame.

== Cast ==
- Dean Lemont as Charlie Nickels
- Kirsten Vangsness as Mona Livingston
- Lynn Odell as Ida
- Lesley-Anne Down as Lady Clairmont
- Raleigh Holmes as Veronica
- Nicholas S. Williams as Clive
- Joe Mantegna as Bugsy Siegel
- Shemar Moore as Bill the Piano Player

== Reception ==
Frank Scheck of The Hollywood Reporter felt that "it lacks the genuine wit that would elevate it to the level of the best of countless cinematic parodies that have preceded it." Gary Goldstein of Los Angeles Times says it was "The deft black-and-white photography, clever editing and strong production, costume and art design deserve shout-outs as well."
