= Kiff Scholl =

American actor

- Born: United States
- Occupations: Actor, director

Kiff Scholl (born Christopher Scholl) is an American character actor and director for television and film.

His roles include Be Cool, Scooby-Doo!, Criminal Minds, Billy's Hollywood Screen Kiss, Falling, Reno 911!, Untold Stories of the ER and numerous commercials. Theatrical productions directed by Scholl include The Poseidon Adventure, the Musical! and A Mulholland Christmas Carol both written by Bill Robens. by the LA Weekly. Scholl has won the LA Weekly Theater Award for acting, the Backstage Garland Award for directing and acting, and was nominated for a 2007 GLAAD Award.

In 2009, Kiff directed his first feature film, Scream of the Bikini, for which he won the 2009 Maverick Movie Award for Best Director and Best Comedy at the Thrillspy Film Festival.

The son of a World War II veteran and a political activist mother, his great grandfather was Zone ReflexoCurist William Hope FitzGerald, MD, considered the Founding Father of Zone Therapy in the USA.

Scholl speaks fluent Danish after he studied in Denmark as a high school exchange student with Youth For Understanding, and currently lives in Los Angeles.
