= LA Weekly Theater Award =

Annual critics' award system established in 1979

LA Weekly Theater Awards
- Awarded for: Excellence in small theatre in Southern California.
- Location: Los Angeles, California
- Country: United States
- Presented by: LA Weekly
- First award: 1979
- Final award: 2014

LA Weekly Theater Award was an annual critics' award system established in 1979, organized by the LA Weekly for outstanding achievements in small theatre productions in Southern California. Nominees were typically announced in January for Equity 99-seat productions from the previous year, with awards handed out in March or April. The 35th annual awards ceremony was held in April 2014. In December 2014, the LA Weekly announced that it was discontinuing the awards, citing the publication's desire to focus on events that would promote its profitability.

== Categories ==
=== Production ===
- Production of the Year
- Revival Production of the Year (of a 20th- or 21st-century work)
- Musical of the Year

=== Performance ===
- Ensemble
- Musical Ensemble
- Comedy Ensemble
- Leading Female Performance
- Leading Male Performance
- Supporting Female Performance
- Supporting Male Performance
- Two-Person Performance
- Solo Performance
- Female Comedy Performance
- Male Comedy Performance
- Musical Performance
- One-Act Performance

=== Direction/Choreography/Design ===
- Direction
- Direction of a Musical
- Comedy Direction
- One-Act Direction
- Choreography
- Production Design
- Lighting Design
- Costume Design
- Set Design
- Sound Design
- Mask Design
- Puppet Design

=== Writing/Composition ===
- Play Writing
- Adaptation
- Original Music

=== Special Achievement ===
- Career Achievement
- Queen of the Angels
