= 2015 Ovation Awards =

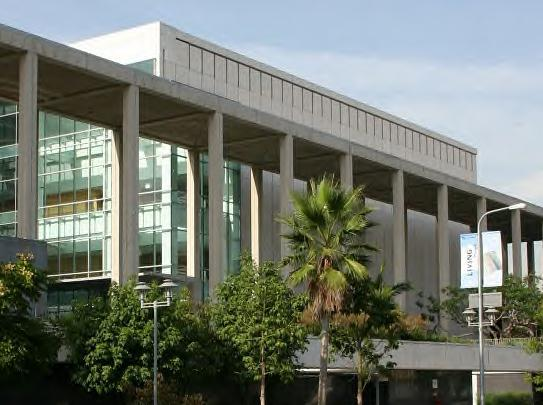
Ahmanson Theatre, Site of the Awards Ceremony

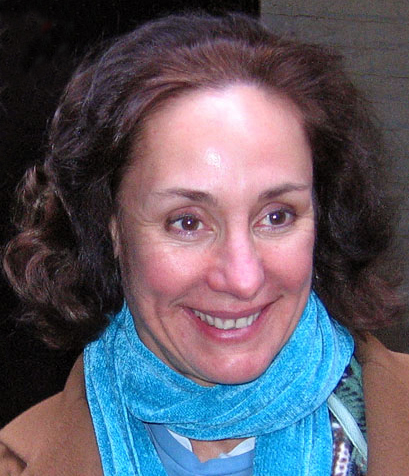
Laurie Metcalf, winner, Lead Actress in a Play

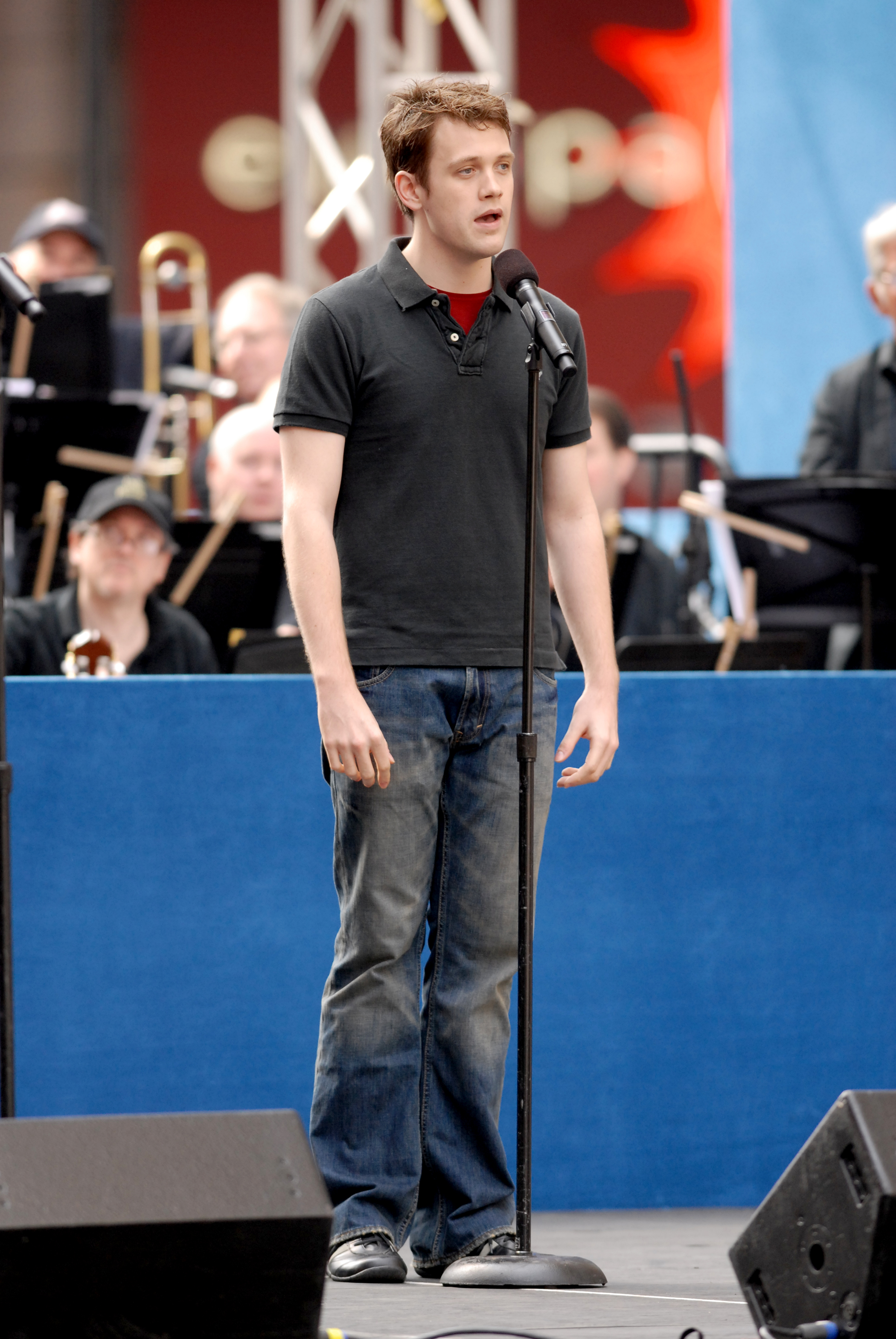
Michael Arden, winner, Director of a Play

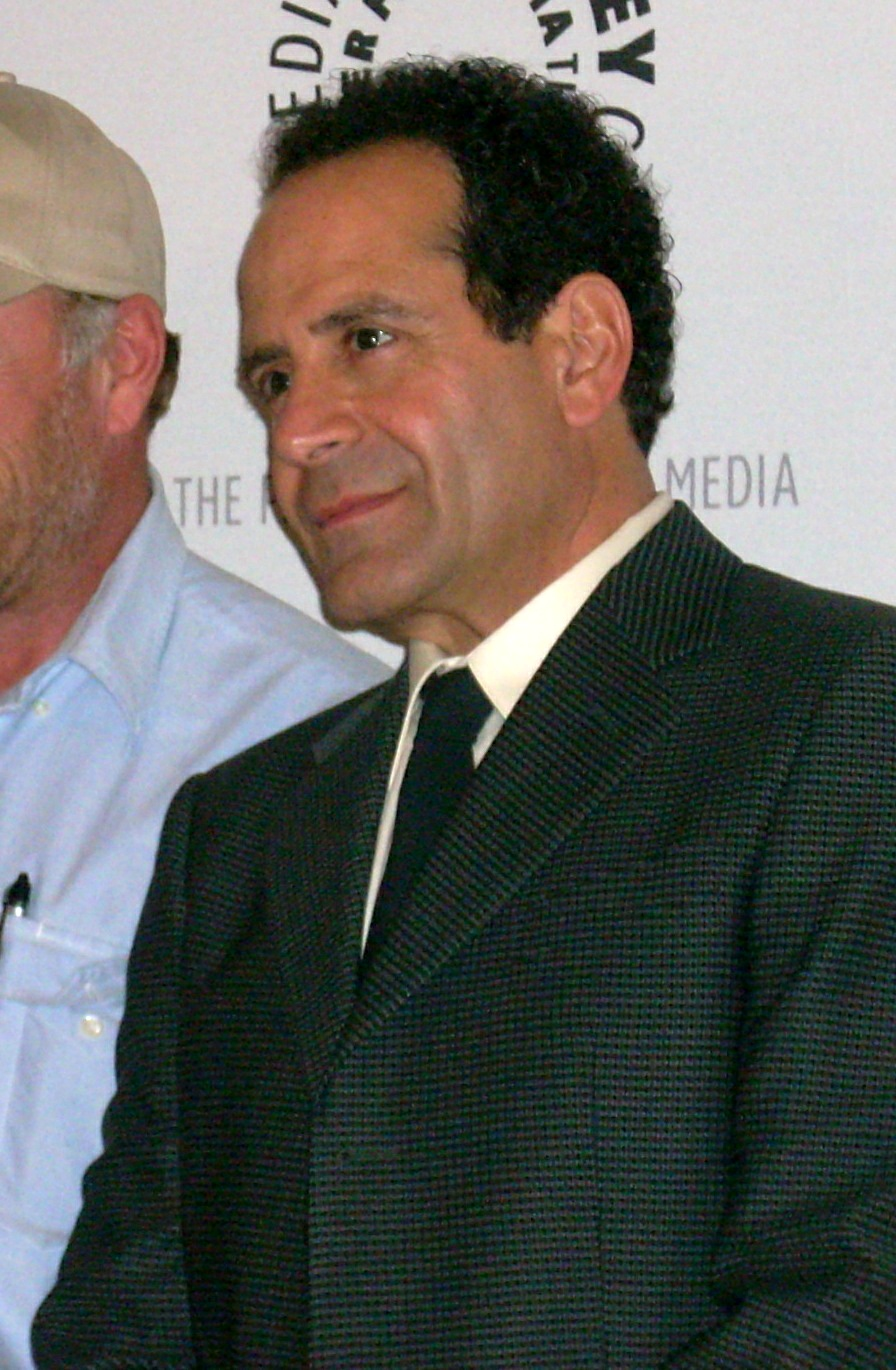
Tony Shalhoub, nominee, Featured Actor in a Play

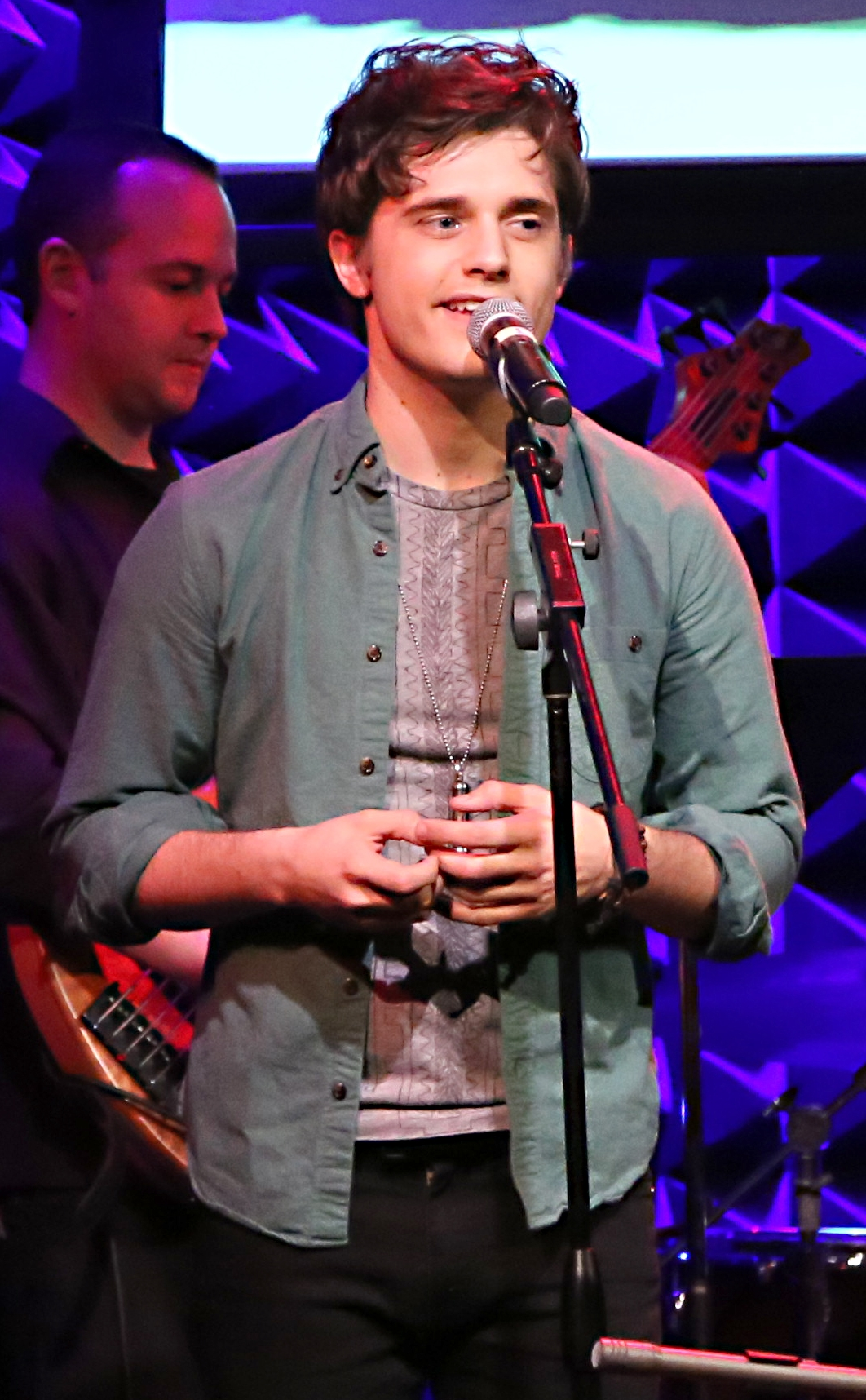
Andy Mientus, nominee, Featured Actor in a Musical

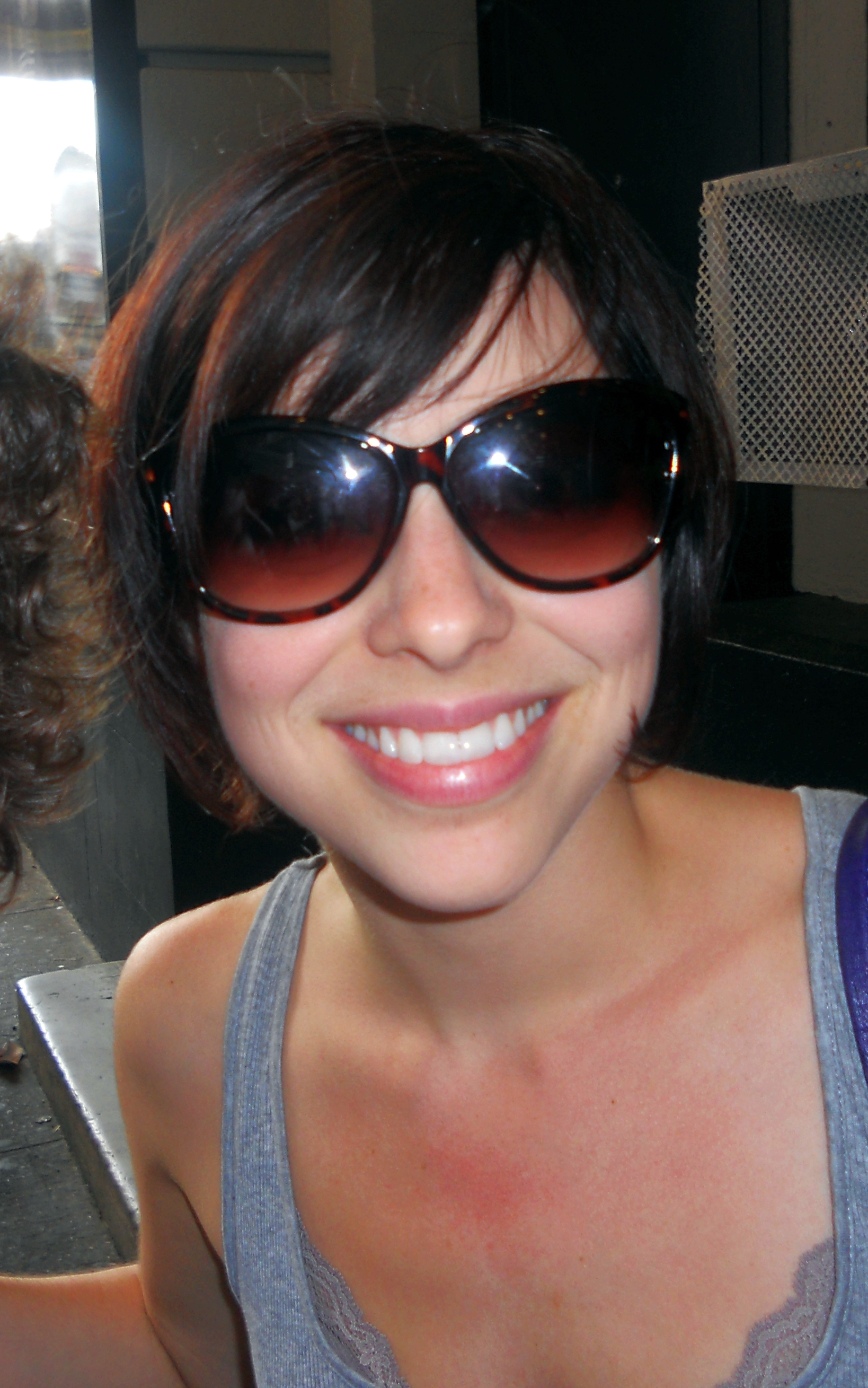
Krysta Rodriguez, nominee, Featured Actress in a Musical

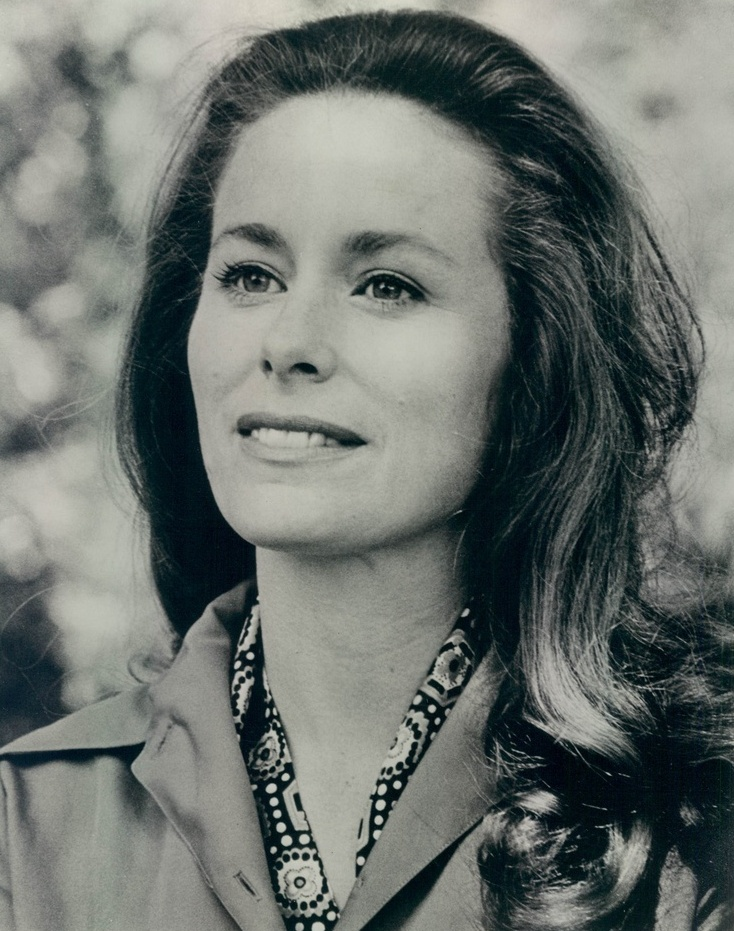
Ellen Geer, nominee, Lead Actress in a Play

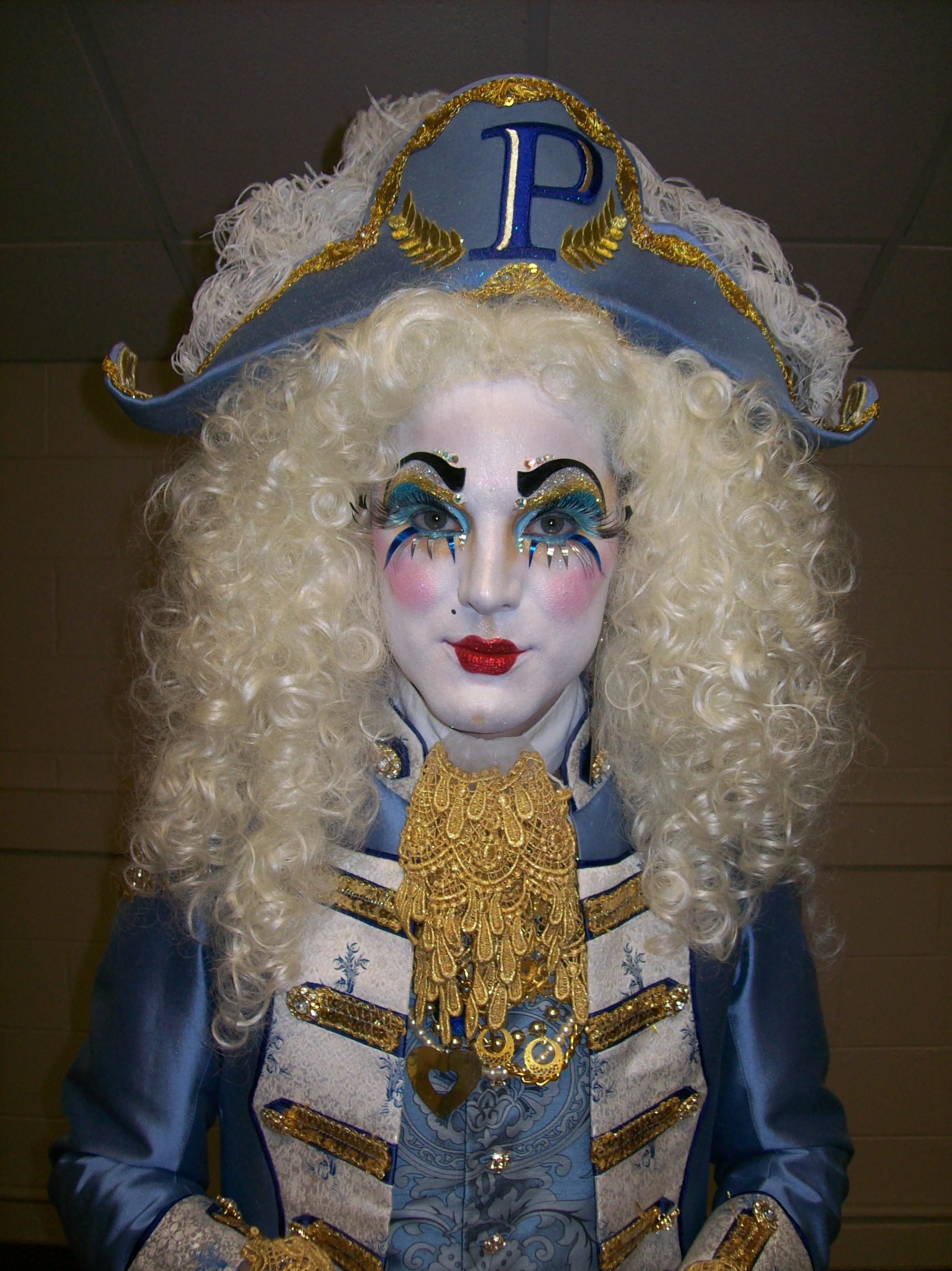
John Quale, nominee, Lead Actor in a Musical

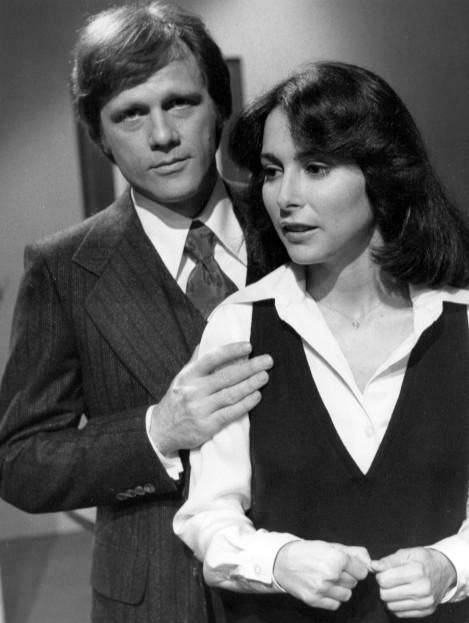
Leon Russom, nominee, Lead Actor in a Play

The nominees for the 2015 Ovation Awards aka the 26th Annual LA STAGE Alliance Ovation Awards were announced on September 24, 2015 by the Los Angeles Stage Alliance. The list of nominations was published on their online magazine, @ This Stage.

The awards were presented for excellence in stage productions in the Los Angeles area from September, 2014 to August, 2015 based upon evaluations from 240 members of the Los Angeles theater community. The Ovation Awards are the only peer-judged theater awards in Los Angeles.

The winners were announced on November 9, 2015 in a ceremony at the Ahmanson Theatre in Los Angeles, California. The ceremony was hosted by actors Vanessa Claire Stewart and French Stewart.

== Awards ==
Winners are listed first and highlighted in boldface.

Best Production of a Musical (Intimate Theater)	Best Production of a Musical (Large Theater)
**Spring Awakening – Deaf West Theatre**; Scary Musical the Musical – Noho Arts Center Ensemble; The Behavior of Broadus – Sacred Fools Theater Company; The Mystery of Edwin Drood – Actors Co-Op; Young Frankenstein – DOMA Theatre Co.	**Spring Awakening – Wallis Annenberg Center for the Performing Arts**; Carrie: The Musical – La Mirada Theatre for the Performing Arts; Memphis – Cabrillo Music Theatre; Ragtime – 3-D Theatricals; The Gospel at Colonus – Ebony Repertory Theatre
Best Production of a Play (Intimate Theater)	Best Production of a Play (Large Theater)
**Trevor –Circle X Theatre**; A Permanent Image – Rogue Machine Theatre; The Goat, or Who Is Sylvia? – Los Angeles LGBT Center; Failure: A Love Story – Coeurage Theatre Company; Proof – Moth Theatre Company; The Day Shall Declare It – Los Angeles Performance Practice; The Temptation of St. Antony – Four Larks	**Chavez Ravine: An L.A. Revival – Center Theatre Group**; August: Osage County – Theatricum Botanicum; Bad Jews – Geffen Playhouse; Last Train To Nibroc – Rubicon Theatre Company; Trying – International City Theater
Lead Actor in a Musical	Lead Actress in a Musical
**Todd Adamson as Huey – Memphis – Cabrillo Music Theatre**; Leigh Wakeford as Bert – Mary Poppins – La Mirada Theatre for the Performing Arts; Gary Patent as Tateh – Ragtime – 3-D Theatricals; Austin P. McKenzie as Melchior – Spring Awakening – Deaf West Theatre; Hugo Armstrong as John Broadus Watson – The Behavior of Broadus – Sacred Fools Theater Company; Ellis Hall as Singer Oedipus – The Gospel at Colonus – Ebony Repertory Theatre; Roger Robinson as Preacher Oedipus – The Gospel at Colonus –Ebony Repertory Theatre	**Christanna Rowader as Mother – Ragtime – 3-D Theatricals**; Cori Cable Kidder as Patsy – Always...Patsy Cline – Sierra Madre Playhouse; Vicki Lewis as Mrs. Wilkinson – Billy Elliot the Musical – La Mirada Theatre for the Performing Arts; Misty Cotton as Margaret – Carrie: The Musical – La Mirada Theatre for the Performing Arts; Emily Lopez as Carrie – Carrie: The Musical – La Mirada Theatre for the Performing Arts; Sandra Frank as Wendla – Spring Awakening – Wallis Annenberg Center for the Performing Arts; Kim Staunton as Evangelist Antigone – The Gospel at Colonus – Ebony Repertory Theatre
Lead Actor in a Play	Lead Actress in a Play
**Jimmi Simpson as Trevor – Trevor – Circle X Theatre**; John Prosky as Botvinnik – A Walk in the Woods – Sierra Madre Playhouse; Leon Russom as Dodge – Buried Child – Whitefire Theatre; Paul Witten as Martin – The Goat, or Who Is Sylvia? – Los Angeles LGBT Center; Michael A. Shepperd as Troy – Fences – International City Theater; Stephen Caffrey as Falstaff – Henry IV: Part One – The Antaeus Company; Dave Buzzotta as The Criminal – Tiger By The Tail – The Group Rep At The Lonny Chapman Theatre	**Laurie Metcalf as Sandra – Trevor – Circle X Theatre**; Anne Gee Byrd as Carol – A Permanent Image – Rogue Machine Theatre; Lily Knight as Emily – A Small Fire – The Echo Theater Company; Ellen Geer as Violet – August: Osage County – Theatricum Botanicum; Elyse Mirto as Leigh Hodges – Conviction – Rubicon Theatre Company; Ann Noble as Stevie – The Goat, or Who Is Sylvia? – Los Angeles LGBT Center; Paige Lindsey White as Sarah Schorr – Trying – International City Theater
Featured Actor in a Musical	Featured Actress in a Musical
**Samuel Butler as Balladeer – The Gospel at Colonus – Ebony Repertory Theatre**; Jeff Skowron as Mr. Collins – Pride and Prejudice – La Mirada Theatre for the Performing Arts; Andy Mientus as Hanschen – Spring Awakening – Wallis Annenberg Center for the Performing Arts; LaVan Davis as Choragos – The Gospel at Colonus – Ebony Repertory Theatre; J.A. Preston as Deacon Creon – The Gospel at Colonus – Ebony Repertory Theatre; Hector Quintana as The Monster – Young Frankenstein – DOMA Theatre Co.; John Quale as Snow Queen – The Snow Queen – Falcon Theatre	**Nicoe Potts as Soloist – The Gospel at Colonus – Ebony Repertory Theatre**; Joanna A. Jones as Lois/Bianca – Kiss Me, Kate – Pasadena Playhouse; Krysta Rodriguez as Ilse – Spring Awakening – Wallis Annenberg Center for the Performing Arts; Gina D‘Acciaro as Miss Angela Prysock & The Princess Puffer – The Mystery of Edwin Drood – Actors Co-Op; Michelle Holmes as Frau Blucher – Young Frankenstein – DOMA Theatre Co.; Toni Smith as Elizabeth Benning – Young Frankenstein – DOMA Theatre Co.; Beth Kennedy as Old Woman/Robber Girl – The Snow Queen – Falcon Theatre
Featured Actor in a Play	Featured Actress in a Play
**Alan Mandell as Gregory Solomon – The Price – Center Theatre Group**; Stephen O‘Mahoney as Billy – A Small Fire – The Echo Theater Company; Darrett Sanders as Billy – A Small Fire – The Echo Theater Company; Andrew Connolly as John Keating – Corktown ’57 – Theatre Planners; Matt Orduña as Gabriel – Fences – International City Theater; Tony Shalhoub as Willie – Samuel Beckett’s Happy Days – The Theatre @ Boston Court; Stephen Kearin as Company Member – The Western Unscripted – Impro Theatre	**Rebecca Mozo as W – Cock –Rogue Machine Theatre**; Melora Marshall as Mattie Fae Aiken – August: Osage County – Theatricum Botanicum; Sophina Brown as Kate – Good People – La Mirada Theatre for the Performing Arts; Peggy Ann Blow as Lula – Wedding Band: A Love/Hate Story In Black And White – The Antaeus Company; Anne Gee Byrd as Herman’s Mother – Wedding Band: A Love/Hate Story In Black And White – The Antaeus Company; Saundra McClain as Lula – Wedding Band: A Love/Hate Story In Black And White – The Antaeus Company; Lynn Milgrim as Herman’s Mother – Wedding Band: A Love/Hate Story In Black And White – The Antaeus Company
Acting Ensemble of a Musical	Acting Ensemble for a Play
**The cast of Spring Awakening – Wallis Annenberg Center for the Performing Arts**; The cast of Memphis – Cabrillo Music Theatre; The cast of Ragtime – 3-D Theatricals; The cast of The Behavior of Broadus – Sacred Fools Theater Company; The cast of The Gospel at Colonus – Ebony Repertory Theatre	**The cast of The Temptation of St. Antony – Four Larks**; The cast of A Permanent Image – Rogue Machine Theatre; The cast of Chavez Ravine: An L.A. Revival – Center Theatre Group; The cast of Failure: A Love Story – Coeurage Theatre Company; The cast of Theatre Movement Bazaar’s Big Shot – Bootleg Theater & Theatre Movement Bazaar; The cast of Trevor – Circle X Theatre; The cast of What Of The Night? – The Vagrancy
Director of a Musical	Director of a Play
**Michael Arden – Spring Awakening – Wallis Annenberg Center for the Performing Arts**; Brady Schwind – Carrie: The Musical – La Mirada Theatre for the Performing Arts; Robert Schneider – Memphis – Cabrillo Music Theatre; T.J. Dawson – Ragtime – 3-D Theatricals; Ken Roht & Matt Almos – The Behavior of Broadus – Sacred Fools Theater Company; Andi Chapman – The Gospel at Colonus – Ebony Repertory Theatre; Marco Gomez – Young Frankenstein – DOMA Theatre Co.	**Michael Matthews – Failure: A Love Story – Coeurage Theatre Company**; John Perrin Flynn – A Permanent Image – Rogue Machine Theatre; Mary Jo Duprey – August: Osage County – Theatricum Botanicum; Lisa Peterson – Chavez Ravine: An L.A. Revival – Center Theatre Group; Ken Sawyer – The Goat, or Who Is Sylvia? – Los Angeles LGBT Center; Mat Sweeney & Sebastian Peters-Lazaro – The Temptation of St. Antony – Four Larks; Stella Powell-Jones – Trevor –Circle X Theatre
Music Direction	Choreography
**Abdul Hamid Royal – The Gospel at Colonus – Ebony Repertory Theatre**; Gerald Sternbach – Love, Noël: The Letters And Songs Of Noël Coward – Wallis Annenberg Center for the Performing Arts; Cassie Nickols – Memphis – Cabrillo Music Theatre; Julie Lamoureux – Ragtime – 3-D Theatricals; Jared Stein – Spring Awakening – Wallis Annenberg Center for the Performing Arts; John Ballinger – The Behavior of Broadus – Sacred Fools Theater Company; Brent Crayon – The Last Five Years – Rubicon Theatre Company	**Spencer Liff – Spring Awakening – Wallis Annenberg Center for the Performing Arts**; Kenna Morris Garcia – Memphis – Cabrillo Music Theatre; John Charron – Oklahoma! – Cabrillo Music Theatre; Dana Solimando – Ragtime – 3-D Theatricals; Sophie Bortolussi – The Day Shall Declare It – Los Angeles Performance Practice; Sebastian Peters-Lazaro & Mat Sweeney – The Temptation of St. Antony – Four Larks; Tina Kronis – Theatre Movement Bazaar’s Big Shot – Bootleg Theater & Theatre Movement Bazaar
Book for an Original Musical	Lyrics/Music for an Original Musical
**Carolyn Almos, Matt Almos, Jon Beauregard & Albert Dayan – The Behavior of Broadus – Sacred Fools Theater Company**; Matt Donnelly & Jamelle Dolphin – Recorded in Hollywood – Theatre Planners; Madeline Sunshine – Serrano, the Musical – Serrano New York, LLC	**Brendan Milburn, Matt Almos & Burglars of Hamm – The Behavior of Broadus – Sacred Fools Theater Company**; Andy Cooper – Recorded in Hollywood – Theatre Planners; Richard Hochberg & Michael Paternostro – Scary Musical the Musical – Noho Arts Center Ensemble
Playwrighting For An Original Play	Best Season
**Nick Jones – Trevor – Circle X Theatre**; Samuel Hunter – A Permanent Image – Rogue Machine Theatre; Adam Bock – A Small Fire – The Echo Theater Company; Carey Crim – Conviction – Rubicon Theatre Company; Ron Klier – Gus’s Fashions & Shoes – Vs. Theatre Company; Bekah Brunstetter – Hey Brother – Fresh Produce‘d LA; Jessica Dickey – Row After Row – The Echo Theater Company	**Wallis Annenberg Center for the Performing Arts**; La Mirada Theatre for the Performing Arts; Los Angeles LGBT Center; Rubicon Theatre Company; The Theatre @ Boston Court
Lighting Design (Intimate Theater)	Lighting Design (Large Theater)
**Jared Sayeg – Picnic – The Antaeus Company**; Tom Ontiveros – Completeness – Vs. Theatre Company & Firefly Theater & Films; Travis Hagenbuch – Spring Awakening – Deaf West Theatre; Jaymi Smith – The Missing Pages of Lewis Carroll – The Theatre @ Boston Court; Jean-Yves Tessier – Young Frankenstein – DOMA Theatre Co.; Brandon Baruch – The Temptation of St. Antony – Four Larks; Matthew Richter – What of the Night? – The Vagrancy	**Ben Stanton – Spring Awakening – Wallis Annenberg Center for the Performing Arts**; Justin Townsend – Bent – Center Theatre Group; José López – Chavez Ravine: An L.A. Revival – Center Theatre Group; Ken Booth – Julius Caesar – A Noise Within; Jean-Yves Tessier – Ragtime – 3-D Theatricals; Karyn Lawrence – The Gospel at Colonus – Ebony Repertory Theatre; Ken Billington – Waterfall: A New Musical – Pasadena Playhouse
Scenic Design (Intimate Theater)	Scenic Design (Large Theater)
**Darcy Scanlin – Completeness – Vs. Theatre Company & Firefly Theater & Films**; Andrew Hammer – Broomstick – Fountain Theatre; Robert Selander – The Goat, or Who Is Sylvia? – Los Angeles LGBT Center; Danny Cistone – Gus’s Fashions & Shoes – Vs. Theatre Company; Robert Selander – Picnic – The Antaeus Company; Joel Daavid – The Glass Menagerie – Greenway Arts Alliance; Sebastian Peters-Lazaro & Regan Baumgarten – The Temptation of St. Antony –Four Larks	**Tom Buderwitz – The Whipping Man – Pasadena Playhouse**; Beowulf Boritt – Bent – Center Theatre Group; Stephen Gifford – Carrie: The Musical – La Mirada Theatre for the Performing Arts; John Iocavelli – Immediate Family – Center Theatre Group; Dane Laffrey – Spring Awakening – Wallis Annenberg Center for the Performing Arts; Anthony Fanning – Switzerland – Geffen Playhouse; Sasavat Busayabandh – Waterfall: A New Musical – Pasadena Playhouse
Sound Design (Intimate Theater)	Sound Design (Large Theater)
**John Zalewski – Danny and the Deep Blue Sea – The Los Angeles Theatre Center (LATC)**; Joseph Slawinski – Flare Path – Theatre 40; John Zalewski – My Barking Dog – The Theatre @ Boston Court; Jeff Gardner – Picnic – The Antaeus Company; Philip Allen – Spring Awakening – Deaf West Theatre; John Zalewski – The Day Shall Declare It – Los Angeles Performance Practice; Martin Carrillo – What of the Night – The Vagrancy	**Drew Dalzell & Noelle Hoffman – Wicked Lit 2014 – Unbound Productions**; Cricket S. Myers – Bent – Center Theatre Group; Paul James Prendergast – Chavez Ravine: an L.A. Revival – Center Theatre Group; Robert Oriol – Julius Caesar – A Noise Within; Philip Allen – The Gospel at Colonus – Ebony Repertory Theatre; Jonathan Burke – The Last Five Years – Rubicon Theatre Company; Michael Roth – The Whipping Man – Pasadena Playhouse
Costume Design (Intimate Theater)	Costume Design (Large Theater)
**Vicki Conrad – The Mystery of Edwin Drood – Actors Co-Op**; Kimberly Freed – Entropy – Theatre Of Note; Michael Mullen – Fugue – The Echo Theater Company; Terri Lewis – Picnic – The Antaeus Company; Ann Closs-Farley – The Behavior of Broadus – Sacred Fools Theater Company; Garry Lennon – The Missing Pages of Lewis Carroll – The Theatre @ Boston Court; Brandy Jacobs – Young Frankenstein – DOMA Theatre Co.	**Christopher Acebo – Chavez Ravine: an L.A. Revival – Center Theatre Group**; Marcy Froehlich – Last Train to Nibroc – Rubicon Theatre Company; Mela Hoyt-Heydon – Memphis – Cabrillo Music Theatre; Naila Sanders – The Gospel at Colonus – Ebony Repertory Theatre; Sharon McGunigle – The Snow Queen – Falcon Theatre; Angela Calin – The Threepenny Opera – A Noise Within; Wade Laboissionniere – Waterfall A New Musical – Pasadena Playhouse
Video/Projection Design	Presented Production
**Jason Thompson – Chavez Ravine: an L.A. Revival – Center Theatre Group**; Nick Santiago – A Permanent Image – Rogue Machine Theatre; Anthony Backman & Jim Pierce – Astro Boy and the God of Comics – Sacred Fools Theater Company; Lucy Mackinnon – Spring Awakening – Wallis Annenberg Center for the Performing Arts; Jason Thompson – The Behavior of Broadus – Sacred Fools Theater Company	**Luna Gale – Center Theatre Group**; Andre & Dorine – The Los Angeles Theatre Center (LATC); The Trip To Bountiful – Center Theatre Group

== Ovation Honors ==
Ovation Honors recognize outstanding achievement in areas that are not among the standard list of nomination categories.

- Composition for a Play – Mat Sweeney & Ellen Warkentine – The Temptation of St. Antony – Four Larks
- Fight Choreography – Mike Mahaffey – She Kills Monsters – Loft Ensemble
- Puppet Design – Ted Blegen – She Kills Monsters – Loft Ensemble
