= 2014 Ovation Awards =

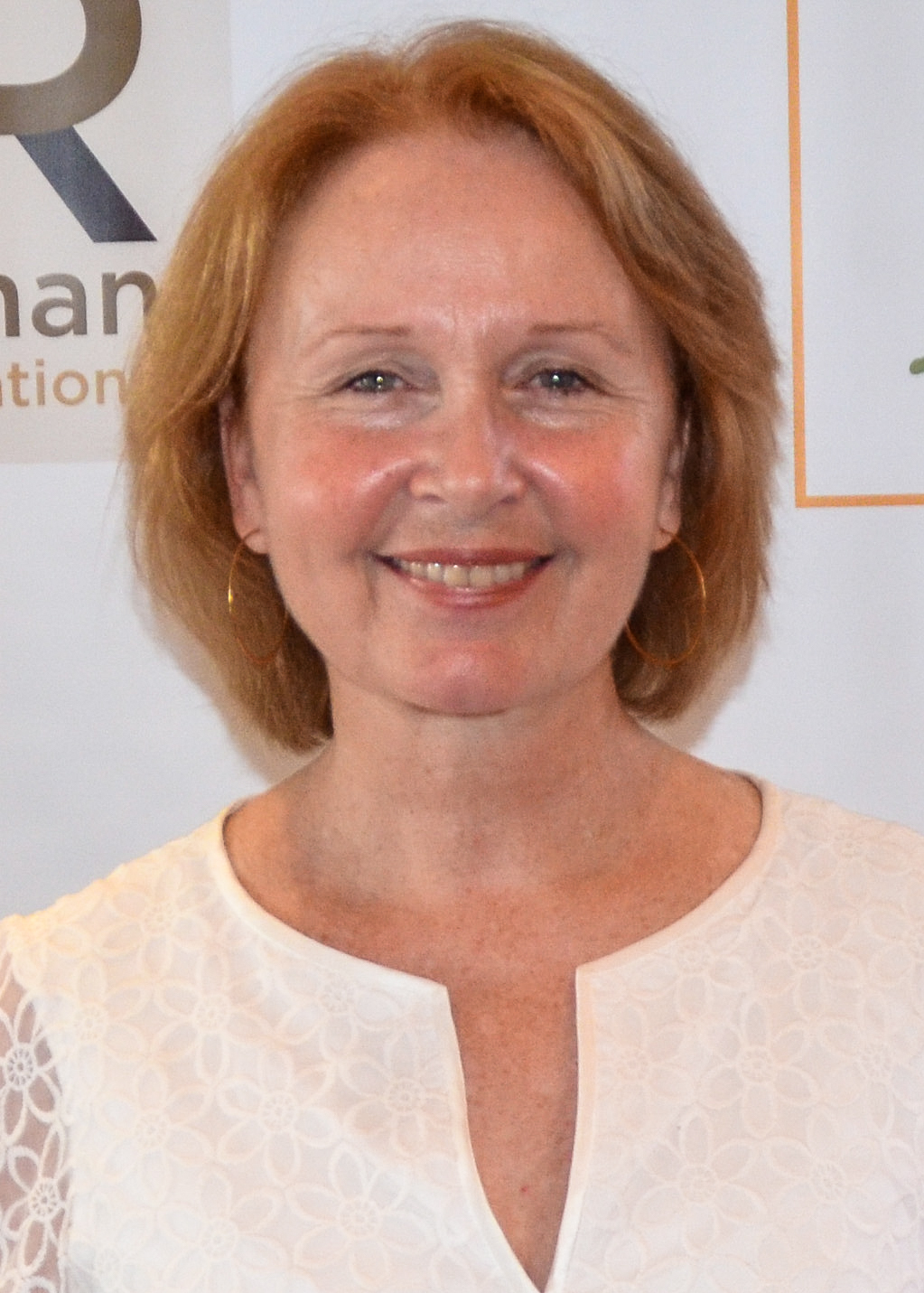
Kate Burton, Ceremony co-host

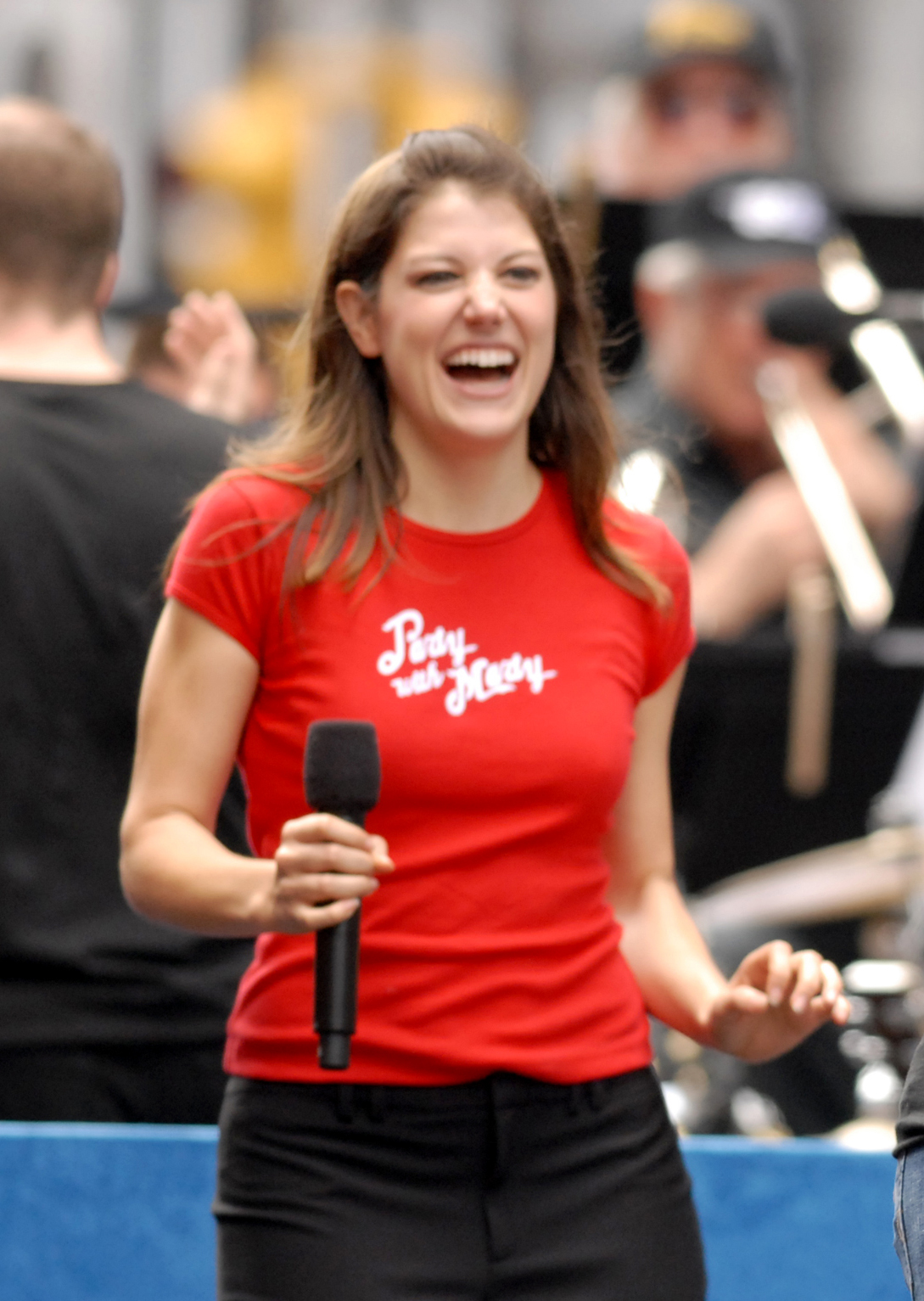
Nicole Parker, winner, Lead Actress in a Musical

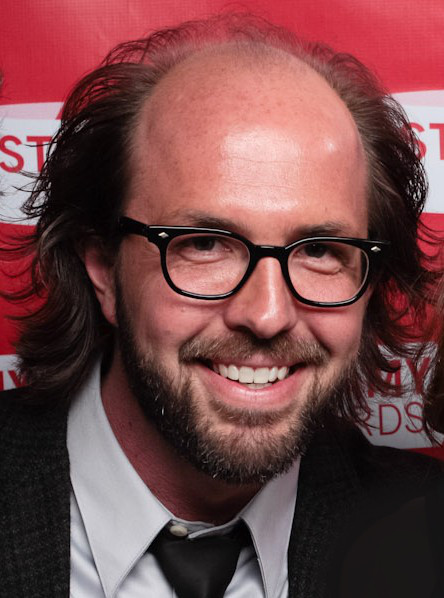
Eric Lange, nominee, Lead Actor in a Play

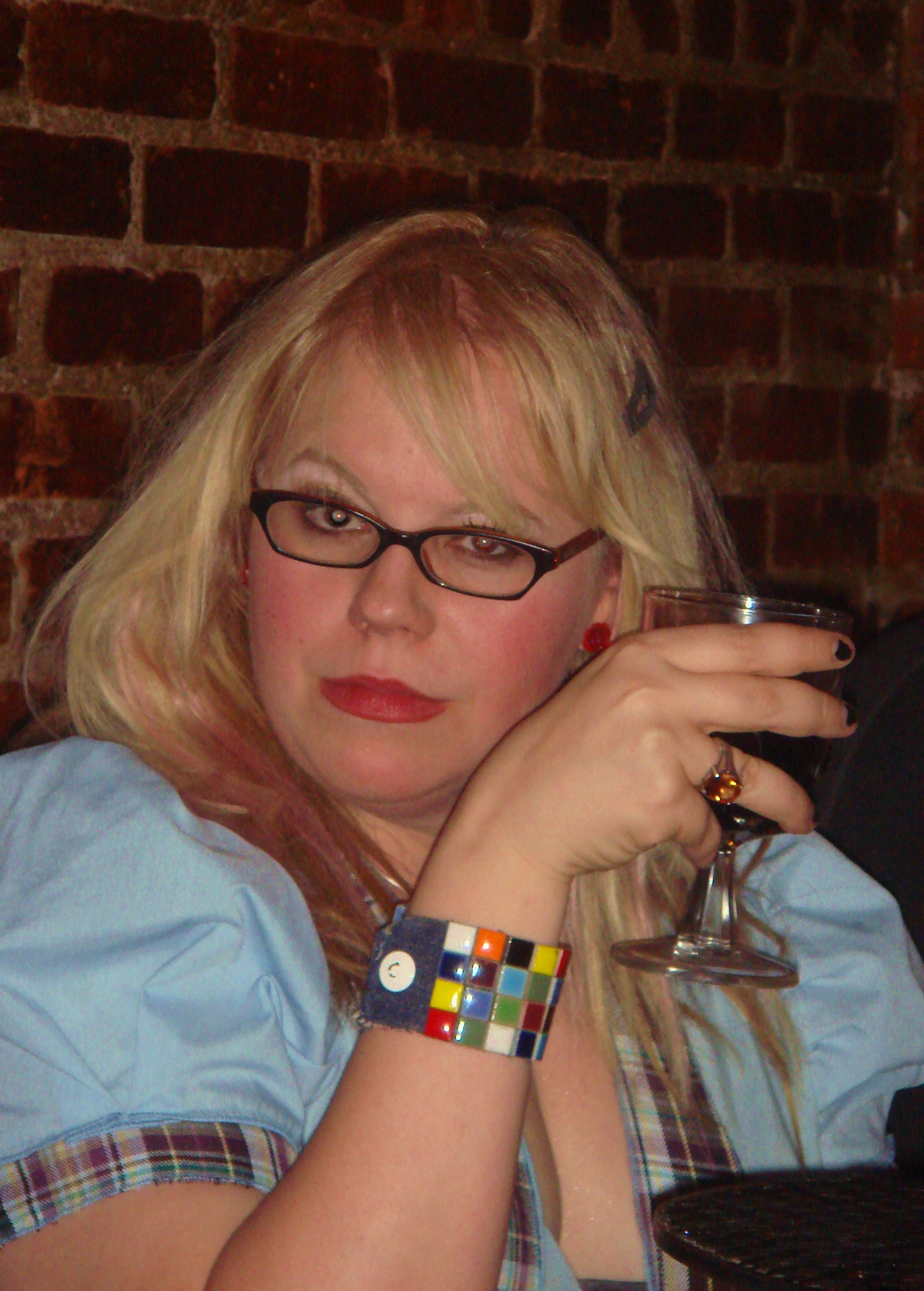
Kirsten Vangsness, nominee, Lead Actress in a Play

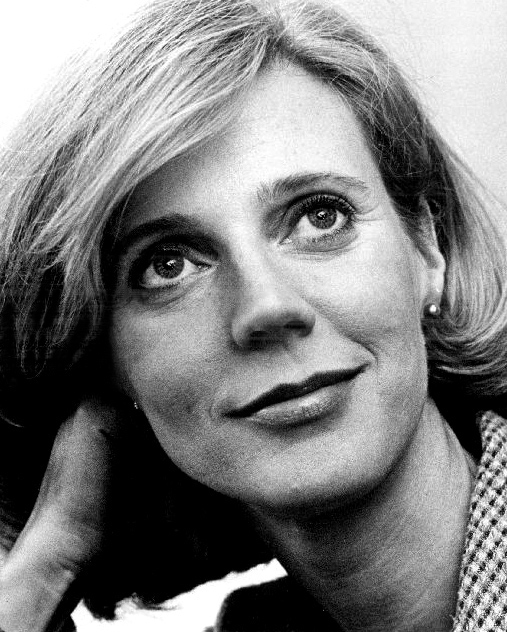
Blythe Danner, nominee, Lead Actress in a Play

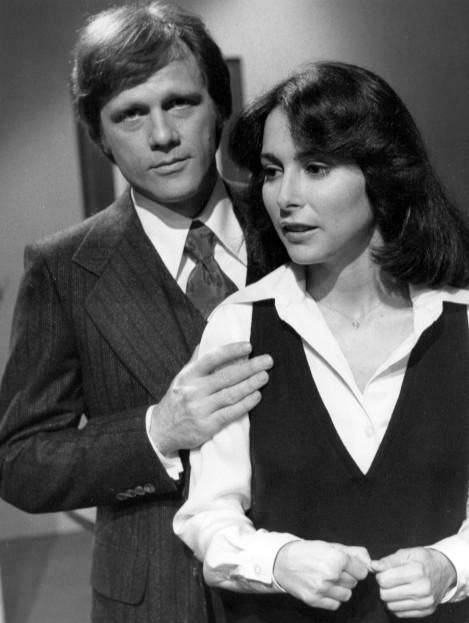
Leon Russom, nominee, Featured Actor in a Play

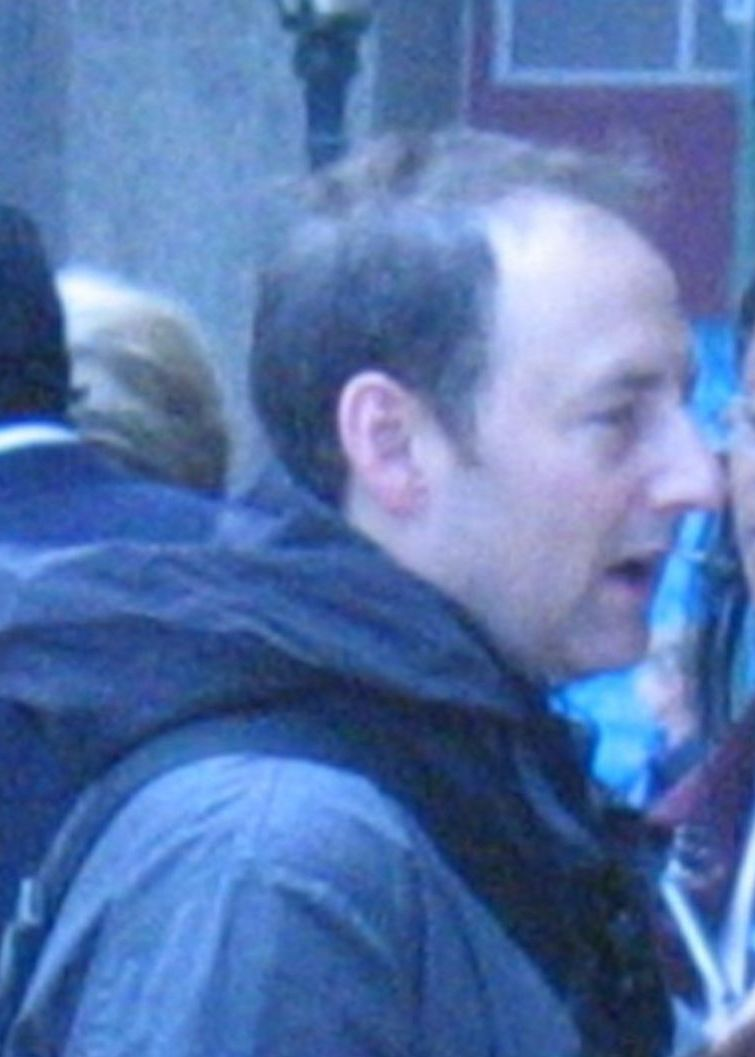
Arye Gross, nominee, Featured Actor in a Play

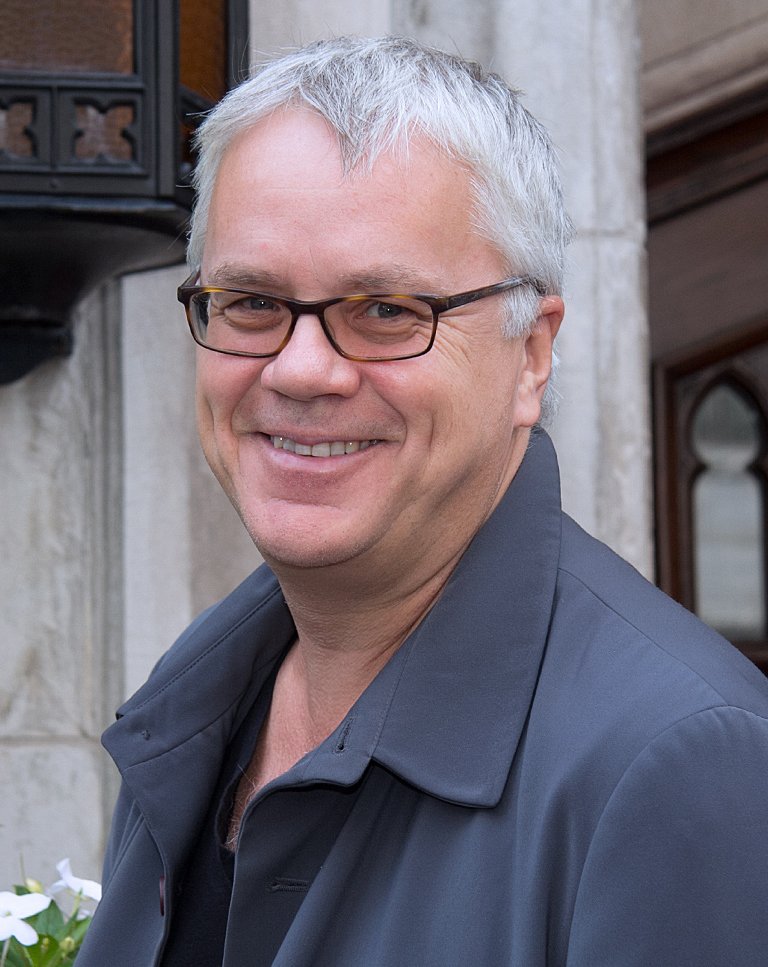
Tim Robbins, nominee, Director of a Play

The nominees for the 2014 Ovation Awards, aka the 25th Annual LA STAGE Alliance Ovation Awards, were announced on September 22, 2014, at the Autry National Center in Los Angeles, California. The awards were presented for excellence in stage productions in the Los Angeles area from September 2013 to August 2014 based upon evaluations from 250 members of the Los Angeles theater community.

The winners were announced on November 2, 2014, in a ceremony at the San Gabriel Mission Playhouse in San Gabriel, California. The ceremony was hosted by actresses Kate Burton and Katie Lowes.

== Awards ==
Winners are listed first and highlighted in boldface.

Best Production of a Musical (Intimate Theater)	Best Production of a Musical (Large Theater)
**110 in the Shade – Actors Co-Op**; Lysistrata Jones – Chance Theater; The Wrong Man – Skylight Theatre Company	**Floyd Collins – La Mirada Theatre for the Performing Arts**; Les Misérables – La Mirada Theatre for the Performing Arts/McCoy Rigby Entertainment; Maurice Hines is Tappin‘ Thru Life – Wallis Annenberg Center for the Performing Arts
Best Production of a Play (Intimate Theater)	Best Production of a Play (Large Theater)
**The Recommendation – Iama Theatre Company**; Everything You Touch – The Theatre @ Boston Court/Rattlestick Playwrights Theater; Henry V – Pacific Resident Theatre; My Name Is Asher Lev – Fountain Theatre; Stupid Fucking Bird – The Theatre @ Boston Court/Circle X Theatre Company; The Laramie Project: Ten Years Later – Los Angeles LGBT Center; The Pliant Girls – Fugitive Kind Theater	**The Country House – Geffen Playhouse**; Breath & Imagination – The Colony Theatre Company; Come Back, Little Sheba – A Noise Within; Other Desert Cities – International City Theatre; Pericles, Prince of Tyre – A Noise Within; Premeditation – Los Angeles Theatre Center; Slowgirl – Geffen Playhouse
Best Presented Production	Best Season
**Matthew Bourne‘s Sleeping Beauty – Center Theatre Group**; A Word Or Two – Center Theatre Group; Brief Encounter – Wallis Annenberg Center for the Performing Arts	**Fountain Theatre**; 3-D Theatricals; Actors Co-Op; La Mirada Theatre for the Performing Arts; The Theatre @ Boston Court
Lead Actor in a Musical	Lead Actress in a Musical
**James Barbour as Jean Valjean – Les Misérables – La Mirada Theatre for the Performing Arts/McCoy Rigby Entertainment**; Mark Whitten as Floyd Collins – Floyd Collins – La Mirada Theatre for the Performing Arts; Davis Gaines as Fred/Petruchio – Kiss Me, Kate – Cabrillo Music Theatre; Jeff Skowron as Thenardier – Les Misérables – La Mirada Theatre for the Performing Arts/McCoy Rigby Entertainment; Maurice Hines as Maurice Hines – Maurice Hines is Tappin‘ Thru Life – Wallis Annenberg Center for the Performing Arts; Jay Winnick as Max Bialystock – The Producers – 3-D Theatricals; Jeff Skowron as Leo Bloom – The Producers – 3-D Theatricals	**Nicole Parker as Fanny Brice – Funny Girl – 3-D Theatricals**; Kim Huber as Nellie Collins – Floyd Collins – La Mirada Theatre for the Performing Arts; Viva Carr as Baker’s Wife – Into the Woods – 3-D Theatricals; Victoria Strong as Lilli/Kate – Kiss Me, Kate – Cabrillo Music Theatre; Alison England as Zombina – Zombies From The Beyond – The Visceral Company
Lead Actor in a Play	Lead Actress in a Play
**Malcolm Barrett as Dwight Barnes – The Recommendation – Iama Theatre Company**; Gordon Goodman as John Barrymore – Barrymore – Good People Theater Company; Roger Guenveur Smith – Frederick Douglass Now – Bootleg Theater; Chris L. Mckenna as Vic – Taste – Sacred Fools Theater Company; Eric Lange as Elliot Cooper – The Country House – Geffen Playhouse; Joe Spano as White – The Sunset Limited – Rubicon Theatre Company; Tucker Smallwood as Black – The Sunset Limited – Rubicon Theatre Company	**Deborah Strang as Lola – Come Back, Little Sheba – A Noise Within**; Karan Kendrick as Angel Mo' – Breath & Imagination – The Colony Theatre Company; Kirsten Vangsness as Jess – Everything You Touch – The Theatre @ Boston Court/Rattlestick Playwrights Theater; Anna Khaja as Rivkeh – My Name Is Asher Lev – Fountain Theatre; Blythe Danner as Anna Patterson – The Country House – Geffen Playhouse; Sarah Steele as Susie Keegan – The Country House – Geffen Playhouse; Elizabeth Rodriguez as Rosie – Unorganized Crime – Elephant Theatre
Featured Actor in a Musical	Featured Actress in a Musical
**Leigh Wakeford as Carmen Ghia – The Producers – 3-D Theatricals**; Josey Montana McCoy as Skeets Miller – Floyd Collins – La Mirada Theatre for the Performing Arts; John Manzari as John Manzari – Maurice Hines is Tappin‘ Thru Life – Wallis Annenberg Center for the Performing Arts; Leo Manzari as Leo Manzari – Maurice Hines is Tappin‘ Thru Life – Wallis Annenberg Center for the Performing Arts; Luke Spring as Luke Spring – Maurice Hines is Tappin‘ Thru Life – Wallis Annenberg Center for the Performing Arts; David Engel as Roger De Bris – The Producers – 3-D Theatricals; Andy Umberger as Roy Disney – When You Wish: The Story Of Walt Disney – When You Wish L.A., LLC	**Tracy Lore as Frau Blucher – Mel Brooks‘ Young Frankenstein – Musical Theatre West**; Stephanie Andersen as Sister Chantelle – Bare: A Rock Musical – Glory/Struck Productions; Hannah Corneau as Ruth – Harmony – Center Theatre Group; Lindsey Alley as Paulette – Legally Blonde – 3-D Theatricals; Andi Davis as Inga – Mel Brooks‘ Young Frankenstein – Musical Theatre West; Rebecca Johnson as Elizabeth – Mel Brooks‘ Young Frankenstein – Musical Theatre West; Annie Golden as Mrs. Werring – The Black Suits – Center Theatre Group
Featured Actor in a Play	Featured Actress in a Play
**Hugo Armstrong as Ted – Backyard – The Echo Theater Company**; Leon Russom as Chorus/Williams/Bardolph – Henry V – The Porters of Hellsgate; Alec Frasier as Adam – One In The Chamber – Theatre Planners / 6140productions; Adam Silver as Dev – Stupid Fucking Bird – The Theatre @ Boston Court/Circle X Theatre Company; Arye Gross as Sorn – Stupid Fucking Bird – The Theatre @ Boston Court/Circle X Theatre Company; Joe Delafield as Alcippe – The Liar – Antaeus Theatre Company; Tyler Seiple as Marcus/Claude – The Pliant Girls – Fugitive Kind Theater	**Rebecca Gray as Susan – Firemen – The Echo Theater Company**; Carole Weyers as Nym/Katherine – Henry V – Pacific Resident Theatre; Shannon Holt as Queen Elizabeth/Hitler/Reagan – Passion Play – Odyssey Theatre Ensemble; Kelly Schumann as Tam – The Homosexuals – Celebration Theatre; Rachel Grate as Kay – The Pliant Girls – Fugitive Kind Theater; Sage Howard as Courtney – The Pliant Girls – Fugitive Kind Theater; Abigail Marks as Dull Gret/Angie – Top Girls – The Antaeus Company
Acting Ensemble of a Musical	Acting Ensemble for a Play
**The cast of Maurice Hines is Tappin‘ Thru Life – Wallis Annenberg Center for the Performing Arts**; The cast of Floyd Collins – La Mirada Theatre for the Performing Arts; The cast of Harmony – Center Theatre Group; The cast of Les Misérables – La Mirada Theatre for the Performing Arts/McCoy Rigby Entertainment; The cast of The Producers – 3-D Theatricals	**The cast of The Country House – Geffen Playhouse**; The cast of Lebensraum – Art of Acting Studio; The cast of My Name Is Asher Lev – Fountain Theatre; The cast of Stupid Fucking Bird – The Theatre @ Boston Court/Circle X Theatre Company; The cast of The Brothers Size – Fountain Theatre; The cast of The Pliant Girls – Fugitive Kind Theater; The cast of The Recommendation – Iama Theatre Company
Director of a Musical	Director of a Play (tie)
**Richard Israel – Floyd Collins – La Mirada Theatre for the Performing Arts**; Richard Israel – 110 in the Shade – Actors Co-Op; Michael Matthews – Funny Girl – 3-D Theatricals; Yuval Sharon – Invisible Cities – The Industry; Brian Kite – Les Misérables – La Mirada Theatre for the Performing Arts/McCoy Rigby Entertainment	**Guillermo Cienfuegos – Henry V – Pacific Resident Theatre**; **Amanda McRaven – The Pliant Girls – Fugitive Kind Theater**; Tim Robbins – A Midsummer Night's Dream – Actors' Gang; Jessica Kubzansky – Everything You Touch – The Theatre @ Boston Court/Rattlestick Playwrights Theater; Jose Luis Valenzuela – Premeditation – Los Angeles Theatre Center; Michael Michetti – Stupid Fucking Bird – The Theatre @ Boston Court/Circle X Theatre Company; Daniel Sullivan – The Country House – Geffen Playhouse
Music Direction	Choreography
**Sherrie Maricle – Maurice Hines is Tappin‘ Thru Life – Wallis Annenberg Center for the Performing Arts**; David O – Floyd Collins – La Mirada Theatre for the Performing Arts; John O‘Neill – Harmony – Center Theatre Group; John Glaudini – Les Misérables – La Mirada Theatre for the Performing Arts/McCoy Rigby Entertainment; David Lamoureux – The Producers – 3-D Theatricals	**Kelly Todd – Lysistrata Jones – Chance Theater**; John Charron – Bye Bye Birdie – Cabrillo Music Theatre; Dana Solimando – Damn Yankees – 3-D Theatricals; Joann Hunter – Harmony – Center Theatre Group; Danielle Agami – Invisible Cities – The Industry; Ameenah Kaplan – The Brothers Size – Fountain Theatre
Book for an Original Musical	Lyrics/Music for an Original Musical
**Ross Golan – The Wrong Man – Skylight Theatre Company**; Christopher Cerrone – Invisible Cities – The Industry; Dean McClure – When You Wish: The Story Of Walt Disney – When You Wish L.A., LLC	**Ross Golan – The Wrong Man – Skylight Theatre Company**; Christopher Cerrone – Invisible Cities – The Industry; Dean McClure – When You Wish: The Story Of Walt Disney – When You Wish L.A., LLC
Playwrighting For An Original Play	Video/Projection Design
**Meghan Brown – The Pliant Girls – Fugitive Kind Theater**; Sheila Callaghan – Everything You Touch – The Theatre @ Boston Court/Rattlestick Playwrights Theater; Tommy Smith – Firemen – The Echo Theater Company; Marja-Lewis Ryan – One In The Chamber – Theatre Planners / 6140productions; Luis Alfaro – St. Jude – Center Theatre Group; Aaron Posner – Stupid Fucking Bird – The Theatre @ Boston Court/Circle X Theatre Company; Donald Margulies – The Country House – Geffen Playhouse	**Michael Hoy & Adam Flemming – The Wrong Man – Skylight Theatre Company**; Spencer Lee & Hana Kim – Pray To Ball – Skylight Theatre Company; Ben Rock & Anthony Backman – Stoneface – Pasadena Playhouse; Sean Cawelti – Stupid Fucking Bird – The Theatre @ Boston Court/Circle X Theatre Company; Adam Flemming – The Different Shades Of Hugh – Road Theatre Company; Hana Kim – The Ugly One – Ensemble Studio Theatre/La
Lighting Design (Intimate Theater)	Lighting Design (Large Theater)
**Jeremy Pivnick – Everything You Touch – The Theatre @ Boston Court/Rattlestick Playwrights Theater**; David Darwin – A Christmas Carol 2014 – Grove Theater Center; Kristeen Crosser – Foxfinder – Furious Theatre Company; Jeremy Pivnick – R II – The Theatre @ Boston Court; Elizabeth Harper – Stupid Fucking Bird – The Theatre @ Boston Court/Circle X Theatre Company; Jeremy Pivnick – The Different Shades Of Hugh – Road Theatre Company; Luke Moyer – The Gospel According To Thomas Jefferson, Charles Dickens And Count Leo Tolstoy – Noho Arts Center Ensemble	**Peter Kaczorowski – The Country House – Geffen Playhouse**; Lisa Katz – Floyd Collins – La Mirada Theatre for the Performing Arts; Jeff Croiter & Seth Jackson – Harmony – Center Theatre Group; David Lander – Parfumerie – Wallis Annenberg Center for the Performing Arts; Elizabeth Harper – Play Dead – Geffen Playhouse; Pablo Santiago – Premeditation – Los Angeles Theatre Center; Robert Wierzel – The Steward Of Christendom – Center Theatre Group
Scenic Design (Intimate Theater)	Scenic Design (Large Theater)
**Jeff Mclaughlin – Pray To Ball – Skylight Theatre Company**; Jeff Rack – God Only Knows – Theatre 40; Jeff Rack – Night Watch – Theatre 40; D Martin Bookwalter – On The Money – The Victory Theatre Center; Stephanie Kerley Schwartz – Stupid Fucking Bird – The Theatre @ Boston Court/Circle X Theatre Company; Deanne Millais – Taste – Sacred Fools Theater Company; Thomas Brown – The Old Settler – Interact Theatre Company	**Allen Moyer – Parfumerie – Wallis Annenberg Center for the Performing Arts**; Tobin Ost – Harmony – Center Theatre Group; Tom Buderwitz – Noél Coward’s A Song At Twilight – Pasadena Playhouse; Tom Buderwitz – Play Dead – Geffen Playhouse; John Lee Beatty – The Country House – Geffen Playhouse; Kevin Depinet – The Steward Of Christendom – Center Theatre Group; Craig Siebels – Wait Until Dark – Geffen Playhouse
Sound Design (Intimate Theater)	Sound Design (Large Theater)
**John Zalewski – Everything You Touch – The Theatre @ Boston Court/Rattlestick Playwrights Theater**; Austin Quan – Dr. Jekyll & Mr. Hyde – Actors Co-Op; Doug Newell – Foxfinder – Furious Theatre Company; Christopher Moscatiello – Pray To Ball – Skylight Theatre Company; John Zalewski – R II – The Theatre @ Boston Court; Dan Spurgeon – The Mystery Plays – The Visceral Company; Bill Froggatt – The Whipping Man – West Coast Jewish Theatre	**Richard Woodbury – Slowgirl – Geffen Playhouse**; Josh Bessom – Floyd Collins – La Mirada Theatre for the Performing Arts; Carl Casella – Maurice Hines is Tappin‘ Thru Life – Wallis Annenberg Center for the Performing Arts; Cricket S. Myers – Play Dead – Geffen Playhouse; Jon Gottlieb – The Country House – Geffen Playhouse; Julie Ferrin – The Producers – 3-D Theatricals; Drew Dalzell & Noelle Hoffman – Wicket Lit 2013 – Unbound Productions
Costume Design (Intimate Theater)	Costume Design (Large Theater)
**Jenny Foldenauer – Everything You Touch – The Theatre @ Boston Court/Rattlestick Playwrights Theater**; Shon Leblanc – Ah, Wilderness! – Actors Co-Op; Wendell Carmichael – Lend Me A Tenor – Actors Co-Op; Kelly Bailey – Pray To Ball – Skylight Theatre Company; Grace Goodson-Witcher – The Old Settler – Interact Theatre Company; Rachel Stivers – The Pliant Girls – Fugitive Kind Theater; Terri A. Lewis – Top Girls – The Antaeus Company	**Michael Krass – Parfumerie – Wallis Annenberg Center for the Performing Arts**; Tobin Ost – Harmony – Center Theatre Group; A. Jeffrey Schoenberg – Kiss Me, Kate – Cabrillo Music Theatre; Colleen Grady – Les Misérables – La Mirada Theatre for the Performing Arts/McCoy Rigby Entertainment; David Mickelsen – Noél Coward’s A Song At Twilight – Pasadena Playhouse; Angela Balogh Calin – Pericles, Prince of Tyre – A Noise Within; Rita Ryack – The Country House – Geffen Playhouse

== Ovation Honors ==
Ovation Honors, which recognize outstanding achievement in areas that are not among the standard list of nomination categories, were presented when the nominations were announced.

- Composition for a Play – Dave Robbins – A Midsummer Night's Dream – Actors' Gang
- Fight Choreography – Ahmed Best – Backyard – The Echo Theater Company
- Puppet Design – Michelle Zamora – Roald Dahl's The Magic Finger – Mainstreet Theatre Company
