= Gregg Daniel =

American actor and stage director

- Occupations: Actor; director; activist
- Known for: True Blood, Insecure
- Spouse: Veralyn Jones

Gregg Daniel is an actor and stage director best known for his roles in the HBO show True Blood and Insecure. Daniel also has a background in theater, including winning the NAACP Theater Award as "Best Director" for his production of Fences at the International City Theater. He is also a faculty member for the USC School of Dramatic Arts where he teaches students about directing. He is married to actress, Veralyn Jones.

== Career ==
Gregg Daniel is a 62-year-old African American actor born in Brooklyn, New York. Over the course of his career, Daniel has acted in many film and television, such as his roles in 2018's Truth of Dare, his role as Reverend Daniels in HBO's True Blood, and his role as Easley Barton in ABC's 50 Cent For Life.

He has acted and directed in various genres. Being a dramatic arts Professor at USC, he has directed plays such as Gem of the Ocean, A Raisin In The Sun, Les Blancs, and Wedding Band. He also has been featured in plays like, A Christmas Carol, All the Way, and Death Of A Salesman as a stage actor. One of his directed plays, Elmina's Kitchen, won the NAACP for "Best Ensemble" in 2013.

== Work ==
Television

Year	Title	Role	Network
1990	Mancuso, FBI	Unknown	NBC
1990	Matlock	Bartender	NBC
1992	Blossom	Mr. Ross / The Proctor	NBC
1992	Empty Nest	Simms	NBC
1992	Life Goes On	Emcee	ABC
1992	The Trials of Rosie O'Neill	Ralph Finley	CBS
1992	Human Target	Coach	ABC
1993	Space Rangers	Banshies	CBS
1993	Home Improvement	Jerry Holborne	ABC
1992-1993	Knots Landing	Deputy Mayor Lofton	CBS
1993	Lois & Clark: The New Adventures of Superman	Newscaster	ABC
1994	Models Inc.	CHP Officer	Fox
1994	Thunder Alley	Parent #2	ABC
1995	Mad About You	Neighbor	NBC
1995	Ned and Stacey	A.D.	Fox
1995	New York Daze	Unknown	Fox
1995	Chicago Hope	Detective McCabe	CBS
1996	Wings	Gregg	NBC
1996	Caroline in the City	Man #2	NBC
1996	Picket Fences	Eddy Dearden	CBS
1996	Sherman Oaks	Unknown	SHOWTIME
1996	Saved by the Bell: The New Class	Colonel Sutton	NBC
1994-1996	Beverly Hills, 90210	Dean Whitmore	Fox
1997	NewsRadio	Kevin Sparks	NBC
1997	Port Charles	Unknown	ABC
1998	Born Free	Unknown	NBC
1998	Touched by an Angel	Coach Higby	CBS
1998	Party of Five	Dr. Calsyn	Fox
1998	Mike Hammer, Private Eye	Grady	Syndication
1998	Sister, Sister	Martin	The WB
1999	Felicity	Financial Aid Officer	The WB
1999	ER	Mr. Powell	NBC
1999	7th Heaven	Carl Doker	The WB
2000	Star Trek: Voyager	Mobar	UPN
2000	City of Angels	Gill / Anesthesiologist	CBS
2000	The West Wing	Steve Adamley	NBC
2000	Curb Your Enthusiasm	Dr. Grambs	HBO
2001	Ally McBeal	Doctor	Fox
2001	The Amanda Show	Neighbor	Nickelodeon
2001	Any Day Now	Peter West	Lifetime
2002	Boston Public	Charles Bailey	Fox
2002	George Lopez	Jim	ABC
2002	The Bernie Mac Show	Funeral Director	Fox
2002	Crossing Jordan	Sean Morgan	NBC
2003	The Division	Tim Jackson	Lifetime
2003	Threat Matrix	General Tucker	ABC
2004	Nip/Tuck	Detective Collins	FX
2001-2004	NYPD Blue	Harold Barker / Darryl Woodside	ABC
2004	Desperate Housewives	Dr. Sicher	ABC
2005	Desperate Housewives: Oprah Winfrey Is the New Neighbor	Gordon Stouffer	ABC
2004-2005	General Hospital	Judge Marland	ABC
2006	Monk	Truck Driver	USA Network
2006	Ghost Whisperer	Minister	CBS
2007	Boston Legal	Dr. Jason Marcini	ABC
2009	Raising the Bar	Witness	TNT
2010	The Sarah Silverman Program	Manager	Comedy Central
2010	Saving Grace	Parks and Recreation Guy	TNT
2010	Past Life	Tom Keller	Fox
2010	Weeds	Simon's Dad	Showtime
2010	Good Luck Charlie	Mr. Billups	Disney Channel
2010	Rex Is Not Your Lawyer	Arthur Brandman	NBC
2011	Parenthood	Reverend Gordon	NBC
2011	Traffic Light	Ron	Fox
2011	NCIS	Parking Enforcement Officer Riggs	CBS
2011	Castle	Walt Shaw	ABC
2012	Harry's Law	Brianna's Doctor	NBC
2012	Kickin' It	Mr. Gordon	Disney XD
2013	Kroll Show	Unknown	Comedy Central
2013	Austin & Ally	Judge Fleming	Disney Channel
2010-2014	True Blood	Reverend Daniels	HBO
2015	True Detective	Judge	HBO
2015	The Grinder	Bartender	Fox
2015	Grey's Anatomy	Paul James	ABC
2017	Urban Nightmares	Wayne Morris	blackpills
2018	Alexa & Katie	Dr. Breitweiser	Netflix
2020	I Am Not Okay with This	Mr. Whitaker	Netflix
2017-2020	Insecure	David Carter	HBO
2020	For Life	Easley Barton	ABC
2023	That Girl Lay Lay	Grandpa Alexander	Nickelodeon

Film

Year	Title	Role	Network
1990	Pump Up the Volume	Mr. Moore, Teacher	
1992	White Men Can't Jump	Leon	
1992	Honor Thy Mother	First Paramedic	
1993	Desire	Police Captain	
1994	Breach of Conduct	Police Station MP	
1995	Indictment: The McMartin Trial	TV Reporter	
1996	Lawnmower Man 2: Beyond Cyberspace	Unknown	
1996	Mars Attacks!	Lab Technician	
1997	Clockwatchers	Policeman	
1998	Perfect Prey	Detective Footman	
1999	New Jersey Turnpikes	Bug's Dad	
2000	Gun Shy	Jonathan	
2002	Van Wilder	English Professor	
2003	Hollywood Homicide	Detective Mando Lopez	
2005	The L.A. Riot Spectacular	Prosecutor	
2007	Spider-Man 3	Precinct Detective	
2007	Evan Almighty	Congressman	
2007	American Family	Psychiatrist	
2008	Hancock	Police Chief	
2008	The Coverup	Judge	
2010	A Marine Story	Sheriff	
2016	Jerico	Thomas Cook	
2018	My Name is Myeisha	Uncle Darnell	
2018	Truth or Dare	Detective Kranis	
2018	Brampton's Own	Dave Thompson	
2020	American Zombieland	Carl	
2021	7th & Union	Arthur	
TBA	Truth or Dare	Detective Kranis	Pre-production

Video games

Year	Title	Role
2013	Grand Theft Auto V	The Local Population (voice)

== Theater ==
Directing

Year	Title	Author	Theater Company
July 17, 2021	Modern Minstrelsy	Kermit Frazier	The Road Theatre Company
March 26, 2021	This Bitter Earth	Harrison David Rivers	Filmed at Road Theatre Company
September 22 – November 16, 2019	Gem of the Ocean	August Wilson	A Noise Within
May 15 – June 9, 2019	Lady Day at Emerson's Bar and Grill	Lanie Robertson	Garry Marshall Theatre
February 6 – March 10, 2019	The Mountaintop	Katori Hall	Garry Marshall Theatre
May 24 – June 30, 2018	Her Portmanteau	Mfoniso Udofia's	Boston Court Performing Arts Center
February 25 – April 8, 2018	A Raisin in the Sun	Lorraine Hansberry	A Noise Within
October 18 – November 5, 2017	Home	Samm Art Williams	International City Theatre
September 23 – October 29, 2017	Br'er Cotton	Tearrance Arvelle Chisolm	Lower Depth Theatre Ensemble
May 27 – July 3, 2017	Les Blancs	Lorraine Hansberry	Rogue Machine Theatre
May 25 – June 24, 2016	The Whipping Man	Matthew Lopez	Cape May Stage
May 7 – June 12, 2016	Honky	Greg Kalleres	Rogue Machine Theatre
August 19 – September 13, 2015	Fences	August Wilson	International City Theatre
July 25 – September 6, 2015	Lombardi	Eric Simonson	The Group Rep
April 23 – 26, 2015	Crumbs from the Table of Joy	Lynn Nottage	USC School of Dramatic Arts
February 21 – March 29, 2015	Dontrell, Who Kissed the Sea	Nathan Alan Davis	Skylight Theatre Company, Lower Depth Theatre Ensemble
October 9 – December 16, 2014	Wedding Band: A Love/Hate Story in Black and White	Alice Childress	The Antaeus Company
May 21 – June 13, 2014	The Mountaintop	Katori Hall	Cape May Stage
April 19 – June 2, 2013	Someone Who'll Watch Over Me	Frank McGuinness	The Group Rep
August 11 – September 9, 2012	Elmina's Kitchen	Kwame Kwei-Armah	Lower Depth Theatre Ensemble
February 17 – April 1, 2012	Cobb	Lee Blessing	The Group Rep
June 11 – 25, 2011	Beneath Rippling Water	Sybyl Walker	The Hollywood Fringe Festival 2011

Acting

Year	Title	Role	Theatre
1986	"Master Harold"... and the Boys	Willie	Actor's Theatre of Louisville
1989	Buck	Himself	Heliotrope Theatre
2006	Joe Turner's Come and Gone	Seth Holly	The Fountain Theatre
2006	James and the Giant Peach	Grasshopper	South Coast Repertory Julianne Argyros Theatre
2009	"Master Harold"... and the Boys	Sam	The Robert Shackleton Playhouse
2010	The Left Bank Bookseller	Ezra Pound, Ernest Hemingway	Manhattan Repertory Theatre
2010	Fences	Jim Bono	South Coast Repertory Segerstrom Stage
2010	A Christmas Carol	Spirit of Christmas Yet to Come, Jacob Marley	South Coast Repertory Segerstrom Stage
2011	Will Who?: Double Falsehood	Camillo	The Antaeus Company
2011	You Can't Take It With You	Mr. DePinna	The Antaeus Company
2011	A Christmas Carol	Jacob Marley	South Coast Repertory Segerstrom Stage
2012	Jitney	Philmore	South Coast Repertory Segerstrom Stage
2012	A Christmas Carol	Jacob Marley	South Coast Repertory Segerstrom Stage
2013	Death of a Salesman	Uncle Ben Loman	South Coast Repertory Segerstrom Stage
2013	A Christmas Carol	Jacob Marley, Gentleman	South Coast Repertory Segerstrom Stage
2014	A Christmas Carol	Jacob Marley, Charitable Gentleman	South Coast Repertory Segerstrom Stage
2015	A Christmas Carol	Jacob Marley, Gentleman	South Coast Repertory Julianne Argyros Theatre
2016	All the Way	Roy Wilkins, Shoeshiner, Aaron Henry	South Coast Repertory Segerstrom Stage
2017	A Christmas Carol	Jacob Marley, Gentleman	South Coast Repertory Segerstrom Stage
2018	A Christmas Carol	Jacob Marley's Ghost, Gentleman	South Coast Repertory Segerstrom Stage
2021	Modern Minstrelsy	Leon Collins	Lankershim Arts Center

== Awards ==
- 2016 NAACP Best Director award for the International City Theatre's production of Fences by August Wilson
- Nominated for a 2013 NAACP Image Award for helming the Los Angeles production of Elmina's Kitchen, which also won the NAACP Award for Best Ensemble
