= John Ballinger =

John Ballinger may refer to:

- John Ballinger (librarian) (1860–1933), Welsh librarian
- John Ballinger (musician), American musician
