= Jessica Kubzansky =

American theatre director

- Education: Harvard University (BA) Johns Hopkins University (BFA) Cal Arts (MFA)
- Occupations: Theatre director; Professor

Jessica Kubzansky is an American theatre director and current artistic director of the Boston Court Pasadena Theatre Company.

== Life and career ==
Kubzansky has directed extensively throughout Southern California and was the 2004 recipient of the Los Angeles Drama Critics Circle Margaret Harford Award for Sustained Excellence. Kubzansky is a graduate of Harvard University, Johns Hopkins University, and the California Institute of the Arts.

Kubzansky has worked extensively across Southern California theatre, directing works with the Laguna Playhouse, Geffen Playhouse, East West Players, Pasadena Playhouse, the Pacific Resident Theatre, and the Los Angeles Theatre Center. Her 2003 Colony Theatre Company production of Lillian Hellman's Toys in the Attic was named "Best Play" by the Los Angeles Ovation Awards.

== Directing credits ==
Year	Play	Theatre	Notes
2026	Best Line Wins	Contemporary American Theater Festival	World Premiere
2026	Octopus's Garden	Boston Court Pasadena, Circle X Theatre, Outside In Theatre	World Premiere
2025	The Night of the Iguana	Boston Court Pasadena	
2025	Everything That Never Happened	Baltimore Center Stage	
2024	The Secret Garden	L.A. Theatre Works	
2024	The Body's Midnight	Boston Court Pasadena, IAMA Theatre Company	World Premiere
2023	Measure Still For Measure	Boston Court Pasadena	World Premiere
2023	A Midsummer Night's Dream	Utah Shakespeare Festival	
2022	Escapegoat	Boston Court Pasadena	Workshop Production
2021	RII	Santa Cruz Shakespeare	
2020	Everything That Never Happened	Oregon Shakespeare Festival	Paused due to the pandemic.
2020	The Father	Pasadena Playhouse	with Alfred Molina
2019	Hold These Truths	San Diego Repertory Theatre	
2019	Othello	A Noise Within	
2018	Everything That Never Happened	Boston Court Pasadena	World Premiere
2018	Hold These Truths	Arena Stage	
2017	With Love & A Major Organ	Boston Court Pasadena	
2017	Hold These Truths	East West Players	
2017	Orange	South Coast Repertory	
2016	Colony Collapse	Boston Court Pasadena	
2015	Mojada: A Medea in Los Angeles	The Getty Villa	
2015	Hold These Truths	ACT Theatre	
2015	Pygmalion	Pasadena Playhouse	
2014	Everything You Touch	Boston Court Pasadena , Rattlestick Playwrights Theater, Cherry Lane Theatre	World Premiere, LADCC Award nomination for Best Director
2013	R II	Boston Court Pasadena	LADCC Award for Best Director
2013	The Phantom Tollbooth	Mainstreet Theatre Company	
2013	I Love to Eat	Portland Center Stage	
2012	Macbeth	Antaeus Theatre Company	
2012	The Children	Boston Court Pasadena	
2011	Anne of Green Gables	Mainstreet Theatre Company	
2011	Camino Real	Boston Court Pasadena	
