= Circle X Theatre =

American not-for-profit theatre company

- Formation: 1996
- Type: Theatre group
- Website: circlextheatre.org

Circle X is a not-for-profit ensemble theatre company located in Hollywood, California. Circle X's productions have been described by critics as "refreshingly original and imaginative" and "consistently stellar".

== Overview ==
Circle X is a 501(c)(3) non-profit organization staffed by volunteers. Circle X was founded in 1996 by seven artists and to date has produced 27 plays in the Los Angeles area. Circle X's current artistic director is Jen Kays.

Circle X is part of the Los Angeles 99-Seat Equity Waiver theatre community, a group of theatres that may employ members of the Actors' Equity Association without paying them union wages. Similar theatres include Sacred Fools Theater Company and The Actors' Gang. They produce out of Atwater Village Theatre along with Ensemble Studio Theatre-LA.

== Awards and nominations ==
Awards	Production	Nominations	Wins	Notes
2009 Ovation Awards	Battle Hymn	2	0	
2013 Ovation Awards	Bad Apples!	6	2	Won for Book for an Original Musical and Lyrics/Music for an Original Musical
2014 Ovation Awards	Stupid Fucking Bird	9	0	In partnership with The Theatre @ Boston Court

== Production history ==
=== 2008/2009 ===
- Battle Hymn – By Jim Leonard, directed by John Langs
  a: World Premiere

=== 2007/2008 ===
- The Flu Season – By Will Eno, directed by Jonathan Westerberg
- Love Loves a Pornographer – By Jeff Goode, directed by Jillian Armenante

=== 2006/2007 ===
- Eurydice – By Sarah Ruhl, directed by John Langs
- 365 Days/365 Plays: Week 19 – By Suzan-Lori Parks, directed by Tom Elliot, Pete Friedrich, David Paul Wichert, Lisa Szolovits and Jamey Hood

=== 2005/2006 ===
- The Brothers Karamazov – Adapted by Anthony Clarvoe, directed by John Langs
- The Bigger Man – By Sam Marks, directed by David Vegh
a: World Premiere

=== 2004 ===
- Sperm – By Tom Jacobson, directed by Tim Wright and Tara Flynn
- King Henry IV Part 1 – By William Shakespeare, Directed by Tara Flynn (in association with Shakespeare Festival Los Angeles).
- You Are Here – By Anthony Backman, Kevin Fabian, Holly Gabrielson, Jennifer A. Skinner & Doug Sutherland
- At Play in the Valley of the Shadow of Chet – By Clown Corn Messiah, directed by Chuck Harper
- Married But Solo – By Ally and Chris Loprete, directed by Thomas Fiscella
a: World Premiere
b: Member-Driven Project

=== 2003 ===
- Marley's Ghost – By Jeff Goode, directed by Matthew Bretz

=== 2002 ===
- Laura Comstock's Bag-Punching Dog – By Jillian Armenante, Alice Dodd & Chris Jeffries, directed by Jillian Armenante
- An American Book of the Dead – The Game Show – By Paul Mullin, directed by Jim Anzide and Jonathan Westerberg
- ElectroPuss – By Trista Baldwin, directed by Paula Goldberg

=== 2001 ===
- Dirigible] – By Dan Dietz, directed by Debbie Falb
- Grendel – By John Gardner, adapted by Paul Mullin, directed by Jim Anzide
- Schadenfreude – By Carlos A. Murillo, directed by Jonathan Westerberg
- Edward II – By Bertolt Brecht, directed by Michael Michetti
a: World Premiere

=== 2000 ===
- The Veil Plays – By Karen Hartman, directed by Julia Hamilton
- In Flagrante Gothicto – By Alice Dodd & Jillian Armenante, directed by Jillian Armenante
- Fathers & Sons – By Ivan Turgenev, adapted by Brian Senter, directed by Michael Jaeger

=== 1999 ===
- Louis Slotin Sonata – By Paul Mullin, directed by Jim Anzide and Jonathan Westerberg
- Beatrice – By Suzanne Maynard, directed by Michael Michetti
- Show and Tell – By Anthony Clarvoe, directed by Luck Hari
- In the Sherman Family Wax Museum – By Alexander Woo, directed by Wade McIntyre
a: World Premiere

=== 1998 ===
- Texarkana Waltz – By Louis Broome, directed by Allison Narver
- The Rover – By Aphra Behn, directed by Michael Michetti
- Great Men of Science Nos. 21 & 22 – By Glen Berger, directed by Jillian Armenante

=== 1997 ===
- The Eight – By Jeff Goode, directed by Richard Augustine
- City* – By Scott Organ, directed by Martha McFarland
a: World Premiere

=== 1996 ===
- The Eight – By Jeff Goode, directed by John Lovick

== Notable alumni ==
- Michaela Watkins
- Jillian Armenante
- Brian Sidney Bembridge
- Jeff Goode
- Joel McHale
- Connor Trinneer
- John Getz
