= Boston Court Pasadena =

Regional theatre in California

- Address: 70 N. Mentor Ave; Pasadena; United States
- Owner: Theatre @ Boston Court
- Capacity: 99-seat (mainstage), 80-seat (flexible space)

Construction
- Opened: 2003

Website
- www.bostoncourtpasadena.org

Boston Court Pasadena (also known as The Theatre at Boston Court) is a regional theatre noted for its productions of new works. Located in Pasadena, California, it houses a 99-seat theatre for its mainstage productions, as well as an 80-seat black box theatre.

== History ==
The theatre was founded in 2003 with a grant from philanthropist Z. Clark Branson. Directors Jessica Kubzansky and Michael Michetti were named co-artistic directors.

In 2019, Kubzansky was named sole artistic director.

The organization has been honored numerous times, including Ovation, Los Angeles Drama Critics Circle, and Stage Raw Awards, as well as being a two-time recipient of the National Theatre Company Award from the American Theatre Wing.
