= Anthony Clarvoe =

American playwright

Anthony Clarvoe is an American playwright born in 1958.

== Education and training ==
Princeton University, A.B. English, magna com laude, 1981 (studied with Daniel Seltzer, Michael Goldman, Jean-Claude van Itallie, Carol Rosen, Lawrence Danson)

Padua Hills Playwrights Festival, apprenticeship, 1988 (studied with Maria Irene Fornes, David Henry Hwang, John O'Keefe, Martin Epstein)

== Teaching ==
Sarah Lawrence College, 2005. Team-taught graduate seminar in dramatic writing based on adaptation from a variety of genres.

University of North Carolina/North Carolina School of the Arts, 2003. Worked in collaboration with student actors and designers and professional director in creation of new theater production based on The Ramayana, using Open Theatre-derived improvisations and exercises.

The Playwrights' Center/McKnight Foundation and Jerome Foundation, Minneapolis, MN, 1990–2. Served as dramaturg one-on-one and as feedback session leader for member and student playwright projects in progress as part of national residency grant program.

Mendocino Arts Center/James Irvine Foundation, Mendocino, CA, 1990. Taught series of exercise-based master classes in dramatic writing for adult writers from other media.

== Awards ==
- Los Angeles Drama Critics Circle Award, Best Adaptation for THE BROTHERS KARAMAZOV at Circle X Theatre, 2007
- Back Stage West Garland Award, Best Adaptation for THE BROTHERS KARAMAZOV at Circle X Theatre, 2007
- LA Weekly Theater Award finalist, Best Production for THE BROTHERS KARAMAZOV at Circle X Theatre, 2006
- San Francisco Bay Area Critics Circle Award for CTRL+ALT+DELETE at San Jose Repertory, 2002
- Elliot Norton (New England Critics') Award for Best New Play, for AMBITION FACING WEST, 1998
- Joseph Jefferson Award (Chicago Critics') for Best Production, for THE LIVING at Famous Door Theatre, 1997
- Denver Theatre Critics Circle Award for Best Play, for THE LIVING at Denver Center Theatre Co., 1993
- Drama-Logue Award, Los Angeles, CA, for LET'S PLAY TWO at South Coast Repertory, 1992
- Drama-Logue Award, Los Angeles, CA, for PICK UP AX at South Coast Repertory, 1990
- Will Glickman (San Francisco Critics') Award for Best New Play, for PICK UP AX Eureka Theatre Co., 1990
- American Theatre Critics Award Citation, for PICK UP AX at Eureka Theatre Co., 1990
- Barry and Bernice Stavis Award for Most Promising Playwright, National Theatre Council, 1990

== Selected publications ==
- THE ART OF SACRIFICE. Broadway Play Publishing Inc. 2005
- CTRL+ALT+DELETE. Broadway Play Publishing Inc. 2005
- THE LIVING, excerpts, in AMERICAN THEATRE BOOK OF MONOLOGUES FOR MEN. Stephanie Coen, ed. Theatre Communications Group. 2003
- AMBITION FACING WEST. Broadway Play Publishing Inc. 2003
- THE WILD DUCK. Broadway Play Publishing Inc. 2001
- WALKING OFF THE ROOF. Broadway Play Publishing Inc. 1999
- THE BROTHERS KARAMAZOV. Broadway Play Publishing Inc. 1997
- Plays By Anthony Clarvoe (THE LIVING, SHOW AND TELL, LET'S PLAY TWO). Broadway Play Publishing Inc. 1996
- PICK UP AX, excerpt, in STRANGE ATTRACTION: THE BEST OF TEN YEARS OF ZYZZYVA. Howard Junker, ed. University of Nevada Press. 1995
- THE LIVING, in American Theater magazine, November 1993
- THE LIVING, Act II, in Kenyon Review, Spring 1993
- PICK UP AX, Broadway Play Publishing Inc. 1991
- PICK UP AX, excerpt, in THE BURNS MANTLE THEATRE YEARBOOK 1989–1990.

== Play commissions and productions ==
- THE JUST (from Albert Camus), commission from Chautauqua Theatre Co. 2007 Chautauqua Theatre Company, Ethan McSweeny, dir.
- THE ART OF SACRIFICE, commission from Playwrights Horizons. 2005 Merrimack Repertory Theatre, Charles Towers, dir.
- RAMAYANA, commission from University of North Carolina & North Carolina School of the Arts. 2003 University of North Carolina, John Dillon, dir.
- CTRL+ALT+DELETE, commission from Wharton Center for the Arts. 2001 San Jose Repertory, San Jose, CA, Ethan McSweeny, dir.; 2002 George St Playhouse, New Brunswick, NJ, Ethan McSweeny, dir.
- CITY OF LIGHT (from Lauren Belfer), commission from Studio Arena Theatre. 2001 Studio Arena Theatre, Buffalo, NY, Gavin Cameron-Webb, dir.
- THE WILD DUCK (from Henrik Ibsen), commission from Great Lakes Theater Festival. 2000 Great Lakes Theater Festival, Cleveland, OH, Bill Rauch, dir.
- WALKING OFF THE ROOF, commission from Signature Theatre Co. 1998 South Coast Repertory, Costa Mesa, CA, Bill Rauch, dir.; 1999 Signature Theatre Co., New York, NY, Darrell Larson, dir.
- AMBITION FACING WEST, commission from Mark Taper Forum. 1997 Trinity Repertory Company, Providence, RI, Oskar Eustis, dir.; 1997 Intiman Theatre, Seattle, WA, Warner Shook, dir.; 1997 Repertory Theatre of St. Louis, Melia Bensussen, dir.; 2000 Bloomsburg Theater Ensemble, Mark Ramont, dir.; 2007 TheatreWorks (Silicon Valley), Palo Alto, CA, Kent Nicholson, dir.; 2007 Theater Alliance, Washington, DC, Jeremy Skidmore, dir.
- GHOSTS (from Henrik Ibsen), Commission from, Rep Theatre of St. Louis & Cincinnati Playhouse. 1996 Cincinnati Playhouse in the Park, Madeline Pabis, dir.; 1996 Repertory Theatre of St. Louis, John Dillon, dir.; 1996 Intiman Theatre, Richard E.T. White, dir.
- THE BROTHERS KARAMAZOV, commission from Rep Theatre of St. Louis. 1995 Cincinnati Playhouse in the Park, Brian Kulick, dir.; 1995 Repertory Theatre of St. Louis, Brian Kulick, dir.; Cincinnati Playhouse, Otterbein College; 2003 12 Miles West Theatre, Montclair, NJ, Jason King Jones, dir.; 2006 Circle X Theatre, Los Angeles, CA, John Langs, dir.
- THE LIVING. Over 40 professional and amateur productions including: 1993 Denver Center for the Performing Arts, Nagle Jackson, dir.; 1994 Theatre of the First Amendment, Rick Davis, dir.; 1994 Repertory Theatre of St. Louis, Steve Woolf, dir.; 1994 San Jose Stage, San Jose, CA, Ken Kelleher, dir.; 1996 The Fritz Theatre, San Diego, CA, Christina Courtenay, dir.; 1997 Famous Door Theatre Company, Chicago, IL, Cal MacLean, dir.; 1997 Florida Stage, Manalapan, FL, Lou Tyrell, dir.; 1999 Colony Studio Theatre, Los Angeles, CA, David Rose, dir.
- LET'S PLAY TWO, commission from South Coast Repertory. 1992 South Coast Repertory, Michael Bloom, dir.; 1994 Horizon Theatre Company, Atlanta, GA, Jeff Adler, dir.; 1994 Encore Productions, San Francisco, CA, David Maier, dir.; 1996 B Street Theatre, Sacramento, CA; 1999 Incite Productions/29th St. Rep, New York, NY, Miky Wolf, dir.
- SHOW AND TELL, commission from South Coast Repertory. 1992 Repertory Theatre of St. Louis, Susan Gregg, dir.; 1994 Ensemble Studio Theatre, New York, NY, Mary O'Brady, dir.; 1997 San Jose Stage, San Jose, CA.; 1999 Circle X Theatre, Los Angeles, CA, Luck Hari, dir.; 2000 Incite Productions/78th St. Thtr, New York, NY, Miky Wolf, dir.; 2003 Raleigh Ensemble Players, Raleigh, NC, Glen Matthews, dir.; 2003 Pear Avenue Theatre, Mountain View, CA, Rebecca Ennals, dir.
- PICK UP AX. 1990 Eureka Theatre Co., San Francisco, CA, Susan Marsden, dir.; 1990 South Coast Repertory, David Esbjornson, dir.; 1990 Northlight Theatre, Chicago, IL, Richard E T White, dir.; 1991 San Jose Repertory, San Jose, CA, John McCluggage, dir.; 1994 Empty Space Theatre, Seattle, WA, Daniel Farmer, dir.; 1996 29th Street Repertory, New York, NY, Jim Abar, dir.; 1998 Pacific Theatre Company, Hollywood, CA, Alan Bergmann, dir.; 2003 Metropolitan Playhouse, New York, NY, Alex Roe, dir.; 2009 Pear Avenue Theatre, Mountain View, CA Ray Renati, dir.
