= Christopher Cerrone =

American composer (born 1984)

Christopher Cerrone (born March 5, 1984) is an American composer. He was a 2014 finalist for the Pulitzer Prize, a 2014 Fromm Foundation commission recipient, a 2015 Rome Prize winner in Music Composition. He has been nominated for three Grammy Awards, and has received numerous awards from the American Society of Composers, Authors and Publishers.

== Biography ==
Cerrone was born in Huntington, New York, United States. He studied composition at the Manhattan School of Music with Nils Vigeland and Reiko Füting, and then continued his studies under Martin Bresnick, David Lang, Christopher Theofanidis, Ingram Marshall, and Ezra Laderman at Yale University.

In 2014, Cerrone's opera Invisible Cities, based on Italo Calvino's 1972 novel of the same name, was produced by the Los Angeles-based opera company The Industry, the LA Dance Project, and Sennheiser. The production received positive reviews and had a sold-out run of performances. Cerrone has received commissions from ensembles including Eighth Blackbird, the Los Angeles Philharmonic, and Present Music. He has been composer-in-residence with the Albany Symphony Orchestra and Exploring the Metropolis/ConEdison.

Cerrone was a founding member and co-Artistic Director of Red Light New Music and is currently a member of the composers' collective Sleeping Giant, alongside Timo Andres, Jacob Cooper, Ted Hearne, Robert Honstein, and Andrew Norman.

His works are published by Project Schott New York and Schott Music.

== Selected works ==
Opera

- In a Grove (2022) for four singers (SCtTB), nine instruments, and electronics
- Invisible Cities (2009–2013) for four solo voices, chamber choir, chamber orchestra, and electronics
- All Wounds Bleed (2011) for soprano, mezzo-soprano, tenor, and piano

Orchestra

- High Windows (2013) concerto for string orchestra
- Still Life with Violin and Orchestra (2010) for violin and orchestra
- Invisible Overture (2008) for orchestra

Chamber orchestra

- Flows Beneath (2012) for steel pan ensemble and 10 person chamber orchestra

Wind ensemble

- Darkening, Then Brightening (2024) for solo soprano and wind ensemble

Solo and chamber

- Double Happiness (2012) for electric guitar, percussion, and electronics
- Memory Palace (2012) for solo percussionist and electronics
- Recovering (2011/12) for clarinet, bassoon, trumpet, trombone, vibraphone, violin, and double bass
- The Night Mare (2011) for flute, clarinet, percussion, piano, violin, cello, and electronics
- Hoyt–Schermerhorn (2010) for solo piano and electronics
- Reading a Wave (2008/2010) for nine instruments placed throughout the audience.
- Variations on a Still Point (2006/7) for guitar, saxophone, percussion, and piano

Vocal

- I will learn to love a person (2013) for soprano, saxophone (or clarinet), percussion, and piano or soprano and piano
- That Night with the Green Sky (2012) for soprano and piano
- How to Breathe Underwater (2011) for baritone, trumpet, trombone, bass clarinet, and pre-recorded electronics
- Requiem [for K.V.] (2007/2009) for solo amplified voice and live electronics. Text by Kurt Vonnegut.
- three e.e. cummings poems (2004) for SSAATTBB choir

== Awards and nominations ==
Ovation Awards

- 2014: Nominated for Book and for Lyrics/Music for an Original Musical for The Industry's production of Invisible Cities

Grammy Awards (nominations only)

- 2026: Best Contemporary Classical Composition for "Don't look down"
- 2026: Best Classical Compendium for "Don't look down"
- 2025: Best Chamber Music/Small Ensemble Performance for "Beaufort scales" (with Beth Willer and the Lorelei Ensemble)
