= Danielle Agami =

Israeli-born dancer and choreographer

Danielle Agami (Hebrew: דניאל אגמי; born 1984) is an Israeli-born dancer and choreographer. She is a teacher of the Gaga style of dance, invented by the director of the Batsheva Dance Company, Ohad Naharin. In Israel, Agami danced with the Batsheva Dance Company from 2002 to 2010. From 2008 to 2010, she was the company's rehearsal director.

== Career ==
In 2011, Agami moved to New York and became the executive producer of Gaga USA. That year, she taught Gaga dance at CalArts at the request of Ohad Naharin. She then moved to Seattle, where she was given a residency from the Cornish College of the Arts for the Velocity Art Center. In June 2012, Agami founded the dance troupe Ate9 in Seattle. After a year, she moved the troupe to Los Angeles.

She created a work titled "This Time Tomorrow" for Northwest Dance Project in 2013. The piece was featured in the dance company's 2014 Canadian tour. Agami has also worked with drummer and composer Glenn Kotche on a series of music and dance projects. One of their works, "Calling Glenn", premiered in 2017. Ate9 and Kotche also performed the piece in 2019 at Boston's Institute of Contemporary Art.

In 2016, Agami won the Princess Grace Award for choreography. In 2018, she received the Virginia B. Toulmin Fellowship for Women Leaders in Dance, an award given in partnership with New York University's Center for Ballet and the Arts.

In 2020, Agami announced that Ate9's performances would be produced into two films. One film features the piece "A Blind Lady" (stylized as "a blind LAdy"), adapted from the stage version that debuted in February 2019 at the Wallis Annenberg Center for the Performing Arts. The other features a work written and choreographed by Agami, titled "An Apology", which is planned to debut in the film.
