= Conviction (play) =

Play by Eve Ensler

Conviction is a play by American playwright and feminist activist Eve Ensler. The play was written by Ensler in 1981, and performed at the 1999 Berkshire Theater Festival in Stockbridge, Mass. The story involves two sisters, one of whom has been in prison.
