= Jonathan Westerberg =

Swedish chess grandmaster (born 1994)

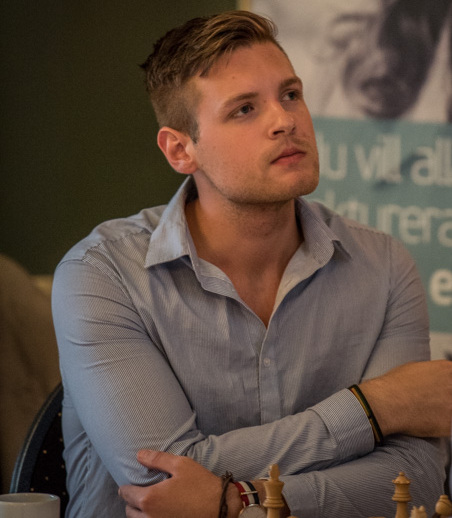

Personal information
- Born: February 25, 1994 (age 32)

Chess career
- Country: Sweden
- Title: Grandmaster (2021)
- FIDE rating: 2452 (October 2026)
- Peak rating: 2557 (November 2019)

Jonathan Westerberg is a Swedish chess grandmaster.

== Chess career ==
In July 2016, he led the Swedish Chess Championship alongside Nils Grandelius with 3/4 after the fourth round.

He achieved the Grandmaster title in 2021, after earning his norms at the:

- European Club Cup in October 2015
- OS Batumi in October 2018
- Elitserien in March 2019

In July 2022, he tied for second place with Tiger Hillarp Persson and Seo Jung-min in the Swedish Chess Championship, ultimately being ranked as the tournament's runner-up after tiebreak scores.
