= Stupid Fucking Bird =

2013 play by Aaron Posner

Stupid Fucking Bird is a contemporary adaptation of Anton Chekhov's 1896 play The Seagull, written by American playwright Aaron Posner, co-founder of the Arden Theatre Company in Philadelphia. Posner has written multiple adaptations of Chekhov and Shakespeare's works. In 2013, Stupid Fucking Bird premiered at the Woolly Mammoth Theatre Company in Washington, D.C. According to Howard Shalwitz, the play takes a satirical spin on a theatrical classic, but has the essence of Chekhov's original intent for the piece—what it means to create art.

== Writing process ==
Aaron Posner has a large collection of adaptations of classical works in his repertoire. While directing another production at the Woolly Mammoth Theatre Company, a friend of Posner remarked that the actors cast in the show would be ideal for a Chekhov play. This sparked the initial idea for Stupid Fucking Bird in Posner, who began work on the idea. His first draft loosely followed the plot of The Seagull— although he cut and combined the original group of characters to create a cast of seven. The draft was tested when Posner, the director, and the actors were invited to Lake George Theatre Lab in Upstate New York. There, Posner and his team worked on final edits. Throughout the week, they workshopped the script: the team held cold readings, blocked, rehearsed; and to close the week, performed in front of an audience. James Sugg supplied the musical score for the show, which—like the show itself—was influenced by contemporary music, but drew inspiration from Russian opera and dance. Finally, the show premiered at the Woolly Mammoth Theatre Company in Washington, D.C. on May 31, 2013. The show received positive reviews and is noted as a successful adaptation of Chekhov, containing the intensity, tragedy, humor, and thought-provoking content for which Chekhov is known.

== Synopsis ==
=== Act One ===
Stupid Fucking Bird follows the life of Con (Conrad), a struggling playwright who is desperately trying to write a new play. Act I begins shortly before a theatrical presentation that Con is putting on at his mother's country home, in which his flighty girlfriend Nina is playing the lead. Con's mother Emma, a famous actress and overbearing presence in Con's life, unhappily attends the performance with her new lover Trigorin, a successful novelist. Con's good friends Dev and Mash also attend the performance. Dev is desperately in love with Mash, while Mash is infatuated with Con, who is oblivious to Mash's love because of his unhealthy obsession with Nina. Nina wants to become a famous actress more than anything and begins to have feelings for Trigorin, who is a successful writer who could advance her acting career. Act One ends with Con attempting to kill himself after discovering Nina's feelings for Trigorin.

=== Act Two ===
At the beginning of Act Two, we discover that Con has survived his suicide attempt. While Nina is attempting to be a comforting presence in Con's life, we see her act upon her impulses to seduce Trigorin. Her seduction is soon thwarted by Emma. Nina leaves, flustered, while Trigorin begs Emma to release him from her clutches. She refuses, but Trigorin finds a way to wriggle free of her grip and runs away with Nina.

=== Act Three ===
Act Three begins four years after the end of Act Two. The ensemble of the show is reuniting to celebrate the birthday of their dear friend Sorn. The first scene begins with Mash and Dev, who have married and have three children. It is discovered that Trigorin is back with Emma, after an unforeseen tragedy concerning the death of a baby he had had with Nina. Even after four years, Con is still in love with Nina and in denial about her absence. After hearing that she is back for Sorn's birthday, he attempts to visit her and she rejects him. Con believes all hope is lost until she unexpectedly knocks on his door. Her acting career has plummeted, as has her physical and mental health. She is in a somewhat hysteric state, demanding to know why Con shot a seagull to prove his love for her. After having a complete mental breakdown, Nina exits abruptly, leaving Con to wallow in his self-pity. Breaking the fourth wall, Con addresses the audience, informing them that, in the original adaptation of the script, this is where his character finally kills himself. He pulls out a gun (Chekhov's gun) and points it at his head. Nevertheless, Con somehow reaches a sort of catharsis while speaking to the audience. He drops the gun, turns towards the audience, and says, "Stop the fucking play" to conclude the show.

== Characters ==
- Con (based on Konstantin Gavrilovich Treplev) – The protagonist, is a struggling playwright. Cynical.
- Nina (based on Nina Mikhailovna Zarechnaya) – Con's love interest. Wants to become a famous actress. Flighty.
- Emma (based on Irina Nikolayevna Arkadina) – Con's mother. A famous actress. Jaded, jealous, and overbearing.
- Trig (based on Boris Alexeyevich Trigorin) – Emma's lover. A narcissistic, selfish, hedonistic, and famous novelist.
- Dev (based on Semyon Semyonovich Medvedenko) – Con's best friend. In love with Mash.
- Mash (based on Masha) – A musician in love with Conrad. Manipulative.
- Sorn (based on Sorin and Dorn) – Emma's brother. A doctor.

== Performance history ==
Stupid Fucking Bird has been produced several times:

- Woolly Mammoth Theatre Company (developed in 2013; first premiered May 31, 2013)
- Theatre at Boston Court and Circle X Theatre co-production at Boston Court, Pasadena, CA (2014)
- DC Theatre Company in Washington, D.C. (2014)
- The Arden Theatre Company in Philadelphia (2014)
- Richard Christiansen Theater at Victory Gardens in Chicago (2014)
- The San Francisco Playhouse (2015)
- Začek McVay Theater at Victory Gardens in Chicago (2015)
- Off-Broadway at the Pearl Theatre (2016)
- Urbanite Theatre in Sarasota, FL (Feb-Mar 2016) Review J. Handleman, Sarasota Herald Tribune
- The Bard's Town Theatre in Louisville (2016)
- Cygnet Theatre in San Diego, CA (2016)
- University of Vermont, Burlington, Vermont, (2016)
- Florida School of the Arts (2017)
- Columbus State Community College (2017)
- Gonzaga University (2017, 2025)
- Circle Players in Piscataway, New Jersey (2018)
- Winding Road Theater Ensemble (2019)
- 12 Peers Theater Company at the Richard E. Rauh Theatre at the Cathedral of Learning in Pittsburgh (2018)
- The Celebration Company at The Station Theatre (2019)
- Dobama Theatre, Cleveland Heights, Ohio (Sept. 2019)
- Occidental College (November 2019)
- Wheaton College (Massachusetts) (November 2019)
- Central Washington University (November 2019)
- Wellesley College (November 2019)
- Hubbard Hall Center for the Arts and Education, Cambridge, New York (January 2020)
- Pear Tree Alley Theatre, Lewisburg, Pennsylvania (January 2020)
- Texas State University (February 2020)
- Harvard College, Cambridge, Massachusetts (April 2020)
- University of Rochester, Rochester, New York (December 2021)
- Kenyon College, Gambier, Ohio (March 2022)
- The Green Room of the Claremont Colleges, Claremont, California (May 2022)
- Dreamwell Theatre, Iowa City, Iowa (September 2022)
- New College of Florida, Sarasota, Florida (November 2022)
- PennWest Clarion University Little Theater, Clarion, Pennsylvania (November 8–13, 2022)
- Brown University, Providence, Rhode Island (November 8–13, 2022)
- Western Washington University, Bellingham, Washington (March 2023)
- Cal State LA, Los Angeles, California (April 2023)
- Massachusetts Institute of Technology, Cambridge, Massachusetts (October 2023)
- Bluebird Arts, Chicago, Illinois (November 2023)
- Masquers Playhouse, Point Richmond, California (March 2024)
- Luther College Visual and Performing Arts, Decorah, Iowa (April 2024)
- Queensborough Community College, Bayside, New York (April 2024)
- Lycoming College, Williamsport, Pennsylvania (April 2024)
- San Diego City College (Oct-Nov 2024)
- Gonzaga University, Spokane, Washington (March 2025)
- The MAIN, Santa Clarita, California (July 2025)
- Oberlin College, Oberlin, Ohio (October 2025)
- SUNY Oneonta, Oneonta New York, (March 2026)
- Illinois Wesleyan University, Bloomington Illinois, (October 2026)
- University of Wisconsin–Superior, Superior, Wisconsin (November 2026)

== Reviews and recognitions ==
The Economist published their review on August 9, 2014: "The script is new and crackling, at once incisive, poignant and darkly funny. Like the original, it affords plenty of opportunities to chuckle with recognition. And like the original, it delivers an ending that is destined to make its audience weep." The review also celebrates the fact that the play was able to be revamped for the present day, while still maintaining the essence of Chekhov's iconic story.

== Original cast and creative team ==
This is the original cast and creative team that performed the premiere of the show at the Woolly Mammoth Theatre Company in 2013.

=== Cast ===
Character	Original cast
Con	Brad Koed
Emma	Kate Eastwood Norris
Trig	Cody Nickell
Nina	Katie deBuys
Sorn	Rick Foucheux
Mash	Kimberly Gilbert
Dev	Darius Pierce

=== Creative Team ===
Position	Creative Team
Director	Howard Shalwitz
Set designer	Misha Kachman
Costume designer	Laree Lentz
Lighting designer	Colin K. Bills
Sound designer	James Sugg
Dramaturg	Miriam Weisfeld
Production stage manager	Maribeth Chaprnka
