= International City Theater =

- Address: 330 E. Seaside Way; Long Beach, California; United States

Website
- ictlongbeach.org

The International City Theatre (ICT) in Long Beach, California, is a professional, non-profit theatre company located in the Long Beach Convention and Entertainment Center.

== Shashin Desai ==
Shashin Desai was the founding artistic director of ICT. He was educated at the Royal Academy of Dramatic Arts in London, and holds two master's degrees from USC. He is the recipient of the Distinguished Artist Award from the Public Corporation for the Arts as well as a commendation from the County of Los Angeles and the City of Long Beach. He was recently honored with the Asian Heritage Award in Innovation.

As a professor of Theater and Film at Long Beach City College, Desai founded ICT in 1985 in a 99-seat “black-box” playhouse on the college campus. ICT has expanded over the decades, for a time alternating productions between the original playhouse and the new and larger Long Beach Performing Arts Center, until in 2000 the company committed to the Center Theater as its full-time home and was recognized by the City Council as the official resident theater of the City of Long Beach. The Theater operates under an SPT Agreement with Actors Equity Association.

== caryn morse desai ==
When Desai stepped down as artistic director in 2011, ICT’s board appointed his wife and theatrical partner, caryn morse desai (who prefers the lower case spelling), as the new artistic director. The current director desai is a graduate of the MFA directing program of the University of California, Irvine, where, as a student of Keith Fowler, she was encouraged to emphasize her “evident producing abilities.” She is the recipient of awards from the Los Angeles Drama Critics Circle, from the NAACP, LA Weekly, Ovations, and Drama-Logue. She has been a member of the acting faculty of Long Beach City College and has also taught at USC.

== Repertory ==
ICT’s first production in 1985 was of Robin Swados’ play The Quiet End, one of the earliest dramas of the AIDs crisis in America. It set a tone for the ICT repertory which, in addition to plays of familial relationships and musical entertainments—including such modern classics as The Threepenny Opera and Master Class—regularly experiments with new works and with edgy contemporary pieces of social significance. In 2011, for example, in announcing the first slate of plays under her directorship, caryn desai said, “I like to think of this season as being 'not quite PC’.” The season consisted of Ken Ludwig’s Leading Ladies; the musical revue Ain’t Misbehavin’; two premieres—a political musical, The Fix, and Michael Hollinger’s Ghost-Writer-- and Yasmina Reza’s provocative God of Carnage.

Now in its thirty-fifth year, ICT presents a five-play season and runs several educational outreach programs. ICT has received over 400 awards for excellence in professional theatre. The New York Times has cited ICT as an innovative theatre, and the Los Angeles Times named ICT one of the top ten theatres in Southern California. In 1997 and 2000, ICT received the Los Angeles Drama Critics Circle’s Award for Sustained Excellence in Theater. ICT relies on ticket sales and donations from individuals, corporations, foundations and the government for support.
