= A Noise Within =

American theater company

A Noise Within is a regional theater in Pasadena, California. Founded in 1991, the company performs classic works of the European canon as well as American playwrights, in rotating repertory.

== History ==
A Noise Within was founded in 1991 by co-artistic directors Julia Rodriguez-Elliott and Geoff Elliott, along with Art Manke, with $3,000 of their savings. Their first production was of Hamlet in November 1991, followed in April 1992 by The Way of the World and The Merchant of Venice performed in repertory. The company operated in a former Masonic Temple in Glendale, which they leased for $1 a year, first with 60-90 seats, and later 145 seats. In 1999, they presented a season at California State University, Los Angeles but returned to the Masonic Temple after less than a year.

In 2008, A Noise Within began fundraising to build a new theater in the former Stuart Pharmaceutical Company building in East Pasadena designed by Edward Durell Stone. SMV Technology Partners gave land to A Noise Within in exchange for assistance from the city of Pasadena to convert the rest of the building into apartments, The Stuart at the Sierra Madre Villa apartments. In October 2011, the company moved into the new 283-seat theater designed by John Berry Architects. The 33,000 square foot building also houses the company's rehearsal rooms, scene and costume shops, offices, and a learning center. The first production in the new space was Shakespeare's Twelfth Night. During the 2018-2019 season, an additional row was added to the theater, expanding capacity to 324 seats.

In 2025, Charles McNulty called A Noise Within "one of the finest theater operations in town," writing in The Los Angeles Times that they, "cultivated in its loyal audience an understanding that the classical repertory exists in the present tense and can speak directly to us today."

== Awards and nominations ==
Awards	Production	Nominations	Wins	Notes
2009 Ovation Awards	The Rehearsal	3	0	
2009 Ovation Awards	Oliver Twist	2	0	
2010 Ovation Awards	Awake and Sing!	2	0	
2011 Ovation Awards	Great Expectations	1	0	
2012 Ovation Awards	The Bungler	1	0	
2013 Ovation Awards	Cymbeline	1	1	Won for Fight Choreography (Ken Merckx)
2014 Ovation Awards	Pericles, Prince of Tyre	2	0	
2014 Ovation Awards	Come Back, Little Sheba	2	1	Won for Lead Actress in a Play (Deborah Strang as Lola)

- 2006 Los Angeles Drama Critics Circle McCulloh Award for Best Revival for A Touch of the Poet
- 2018 Los Angeles Drama Critics Circle McCulloh Award for Best Revival for Rosencrantz and Guildenstern Are Dead
- 2025 Los Angeles Drama Critics Circle McCulloh Award for Best Revival for Joe Turner’s Come and Gone
