= Wedding Band: A Love/Hate Story in Black and White =

1962/63 play by Alice Childress

Wedding Band: A Love/Hate Story in Black and White is a play by Alice Childress. Written in either 1962 or 1963, (Note: Different sources give different dates.) it debuted at the University of Michigan in 1966, and was presented Off-Broadway in 1972 at the New York Shakespeare Festival. Set in 1918, the play deals with the impact of anti-miscegenation laws in the American South after the Reconstruction period.

== Background ==
Childress's writing in the 1960s was characterized by a focus on black nationalism. The play was part of her attempt to interpret the "new wave" of Black Power nationalism by investigating the earlier form of Garveyism, which was popular in the time of the play's setting. It was inspired by a true story often told to her by her grandmother.

== Plot ==
The play takes place in South Carolina in 1918, over a span of three days near the end of World War I. It focuses on Julia, a black seamstress, and her relationship with Herman, a white baker. They have been together for ten years. They want to move to the North where they could marry freely, but are prevented from doing so because Herman has unpaid debt.

=== Act 1 ===
The story begins with the audience meeting Julia's landlady and fellow renters, who are all black. Her neighbours ask prying questions about her personal life, and Julia tells them about Herman. They initially assume she is with him for money, and do not approve of her decision to be with a poor white man. Herman presents Julia with a cake and ring to celebrate their tenth anniversary. As they cannot marry, the ring is attached to a chain, so that she can wear it as a necklace. He gives her money to buy a trip to New York, and promises to join her in a year after his debts are repaid. The couple begin to plan for their future wedding; however, Herman catches influenza, halting their plans.

=== Act 2 ===
Act 2 begins with Herman collapsed at Julia's house. Her landlady does not let a doctor be called, as she is worried about potential legal action against her for sheltering an interracial couple. Herman's sister and mother arrive, but his mother refuses to bring him to the doctor until nightfall, fearing for her reputation. While waiting for darkness to arrive, Julia and Herman's mother argue and shout racial slurs and insults at each other. With Herman in an incoherent state, his mother prods him to recite a racist speech he was forced to memorize at a young age. Julia, full of rage, orders them both out of the house, and continues to yell after they leave.

=== Act 3 ===
Act 3 opens the next day with Julia drunk and in a wedding dress. One of her neighbours, Mattie, arrives and tells Julia that she is not legally married, as South Carolina does not recognize divorce. Because of this, Mattie cannot marry her partner of eleven years and is still technically married to her first husband, an abusive man. Right after, Herman comes with two tickets to New York. However, Julia is unable to forget the previous day, and gives the tickets, along with her wedding band, to Mattie. When Herman's mother and sister arrive, Julia locks them out of the house, and the couple embraces. Julia pretends that they are on the ship to New York while Herman dies in her arms.

== Themes ==
The play addresses what Childress called the "anti-woman" laws in the American South, through legal, racial, and gendered lenses. By setting the play in the past, she aims to illuminate the racist attitudes in the present.

== Productions ==
The play was optioned for Broadway seven times. However, the production faced difficulties, as producers told Childress that the play was too risky and ahead of its time. They wanted to focus more on Herman, the white viewpoint, while Childress wanted to keep the focus on Julia, the black viewpoint. A television adaptation was also produced in either 1973 or 1974 by ABC.

=== University of Michigan, Professional Theatre Program – 1966 ===
- Ruby Dee – Julia Augustine
- Lisa Huggins – Teeta
- Abbey Lincoln – Mattie
- Clarice Taylor – Fanny Johnson
- Minnie Gentry – Lula Green
- Moses Gunn – Nelson Green
- John Leighton – Bell Man
- Alyssa Ross – Princess
- John Harkins – Herman
- Marcie Hubert – Annabelle
- Katherine Squire – Herman's Mother
- Thomas Anderson – Uncle Greenlee

The director was Marcella Cisney, while scenery was by Ed Wittstein, costumes were by Jane Greenwood, and lighting was by Jules Fisher.

=== New York Shakespeare Festival, The Public Theater – November 26, 1972 ===
- Ruby Dee – Julia Augustine
- Calisse Dinwiddie – Teeta
- Juanita Clark – Mattie
- Clarice Taylor – Fanny Johnson
- Hilda Haynes – Lula Green
- Albert Hall – Nelson Green
- Brandon Maggart – Bell Man
- Vicky Geyer – Princess
- James Broderick – Herman
- Polly Holiday – Annabelle
- Jean David – Herman's Mother

The director was Joseph Papp, while scene design was by Ming Cho Lee, costumes were by Theoni V. Aldredge, and lighting was by Martin Aronstein.
