= John Ballinger (musician) =

American composer

- Years active: 2011-
- Known for: Music, Composing

John Ballinger is a composer and multi-instrumentalist based in Los Angeles. He has enjoyed a wide-ranging theatrical, film, recording and live performance career worldwide, having recorded, performed, and/or toured with Rufus Wainwright, Van Dyke Parks, Tituss Burgess, The Lyris Quartet, Tracy Bonham, Pato Banton, Moira Smiley, The Dreaming Ferns/Rebecca Jordan, and Grant Gershon/L.A. Master Chorale.

Ballinger earned his BFA in music composition from California Institute of the Arts, where he studied privately with Arnold Schoenberg protégé Leonard Stein, Mel Powell, and Rand Steiger. He earned his Master of Music degree in Commercial Music Composition from CSULA studying with Steve Wight and Ross Levinson.

He recently composed the original score and songs for the independent feature film Life Support, written and directed by Larry Clarke and is currently arranging, producing, and performing on Susannah Blinkoff's album "Girl Gone Wilder" which is a collection of songs by Alec Wilder.

Ballinger was nominated for a 2015 Ovation Award for Best Musical Direction for his work on The Behavior of Broadus with the Sacred Fools Theater Company.
