= Antaeus Theatre Company =

American theatre company

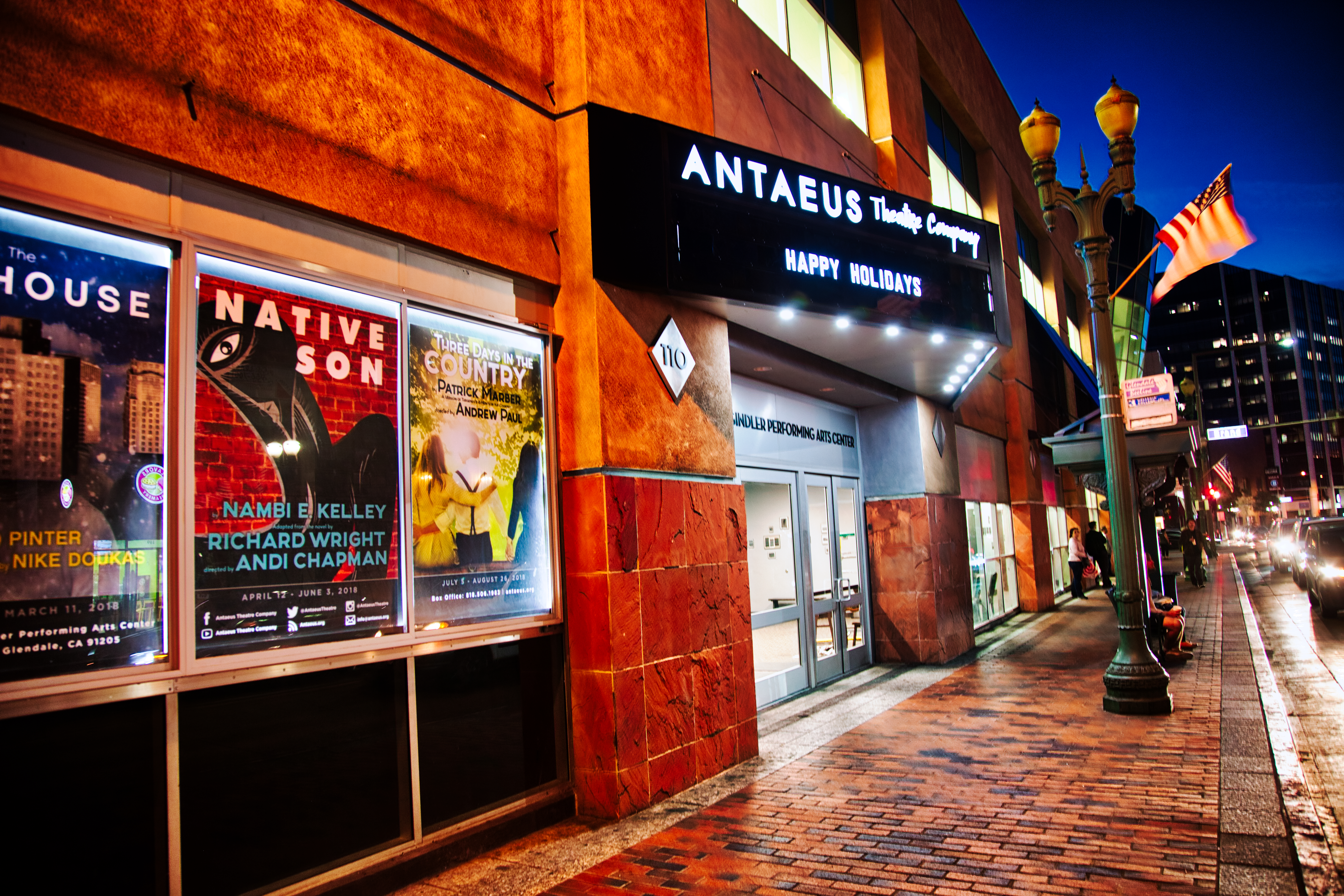
- The Kiki & David Gindler Performing Arts Center (2017)
- Formation: 1991
- Type: Non-profit theatre company
- Location: Glendale, California, U.S.
- Website: www.antaeus.org

Antaeus Theatre Company is a professional American classical theatre company based in Glendale, California. Founded in 1991 by Dakin Matthews and Lillian Groag as a project of Center Theatre Group, the theatre has since been listed as one of the best intimate theatres in Los Angeles by the Los Angeles Times. Since 2017, the company has been located at the Kiki & David Gindler Performing Arts Center.

== History ==
=== Founding ===
The Antaeus Company, as it was originally known, was founded in 1991 as a project of the Center Theatre Group at the Mark Taper Forum, by Co-Artistic Directors Dakin Matthews and Lillian Groag. They believed that a professional classical ensemble could thrive in a city driven by the television and film industry. Initially, productions were “partner cast,” to accommodate actors committing to long runs without losing short-term television and film work.

=== North Hollywood & Non-Profit Status ===
In April 1996, Antaeus moved to the NewPlace Theatre Center in North Hollywood's NoHo Arts District. The venue was used for rehearsals and education, while the company performed their full productions at other venues, such as The Getty Villa, the Skirball Center, Ventura Court Theatre, the Theatre at Boston Court, Providence High School, and the Ivy Substation.

Antaeus received federal tax-exempt status in February 1996, as a Non-Profit organization.

=== Arts Education Outreach ===
Antaeus created an outreach program for underserved youth and began performing student matinee performances of their main-stage productions, for middle and high school students, with Glendale Unified School District.

=== ClassicsFest ===
In 2004, the company began an annual festival of staged readings of classic plays, titled ClassicsFest.

=== Shared space with Deaf West Theatre ===
After NewPlace Theatre Center was sold, Antaeus Theatre Company shared a theatre space with Deaf West Theatre, before taking sole occupancy. Originally referred to as Deaf West Theatre, the theatre space became known as the Antaeus/Deaf West Space.

=== Kiki & David Gindler Performing Arts Center ===
In March 2017, Antaeus opened the Kiki & David Gindler Performing Arts Center, a new permanent home in Downtown Glendale.

=== COVID-19 ===
In response to the COVID-19 pandemic, Antaeus commissioned The Zip Code Plays, a series of short audio plays of which three seasons were produced.

=== Playwright Commissions ===
In 2021, Antaeus began commissioning new plays based on classics, awarded to select playwrights each year between 2022-2024.

== Leadership ==
As of 2026, Antaeus Theatre Company's Artistic Director is Nike Doukas, who succeeded former Artistic Director Bill Brochtrup. Executive Director, Joe Witt, joined the leadership team in 2026, replacing the outgoing Ana Rose O'Halloran.

== Production history ==
Antaeus Production History:
Show Title:	Directed By:	Season:
The Wood Demon by Anton Chekhov, In a World Premiere Translation by Nicholas Saunders & Frank Dwyer	Frank Dwyer	1994
Of Mice and Men by John Steinbeck	Frank Dwyer	1996
Patience by W.S. Gilbert, Music by Arthur Sullivan	Maryedith Burrell, Music Direction by Jan Powell	1998
The Liar by Juan Ruiz de Alarcon, in a new rhyming verse translation by Dakin Matthews	Anne McNaughton	2000
The Man Who Had All The Luck by Arthur Miller	Dan Fields	2000
Mercadet by Honoré de Balzac, Translated by Robert Cornthwaite	Dakin Matthews & John Achorn	2001
Legal Briefs by Billy K. Welles, Miguel de Cervantes, J.M. Barrie, Gilbert & Sullivan	Michael Haney, Emily Chase, Anne McNaughton	2001
Proof of the Promise by Juan Ruiz de Alarcón, World Premiere Rhyming Verse Translation by Dakin Matthews	Anne McNaughton	2002
Chekhov x 4 by Anton Chekhov. Translations by Nicholas Saunders and Frank Dwyer	Sabin Epstein, Stephanie Shroyer, Michael Michetti, Andy Robinson	2004
Mother Courage and Her Children by Bertolt Brecht, Music by Paul Dessau, Hanns Eisler, Kurt Weill, and Jan Powell & Ken Stone, English Version by Eric Bentley	Andrew J. Robinson	2005
Pera Palas by Sinan Unel	Michael Michetti	2005
Tonight at 8:30 by Noël Coward	William Ludel, Michael Murray, Stephanie Shroyer, Stefan Novinski, Robert Goldsby, Brendon Fox	2007
American Tales, Book and Lyrics by Ken Stone, Music by Jan Powell	Thor Steingraber & Kay Cole	2008
Cousin Bette by Jeffrey Hatcher	Jeanie Hackett	2009
King Lear by William Shakespeare	Bart DeLorenzo	2010
The Autumn Garden by Lillian Hellman	Larry Biederman	2010
The Malcontent by John Marston	Elizabeth Swain	2011
Peace in Our Time by Noël Coward, Adaptation by Barry Creyton	Casey Stangl	2011
The Seagull by Anton Chekhov, Translated by Paul Schmidt	Andrew J. Traister	2012
Macbeth by William Shakespeare	Jessica Kubzansky	2012
You Can't Take it With You by George Kaufman and Moss Hart	Gigi Bermingham	2012
Mrs. Warren's Profession by George Bernard Shaw	Robin Larsen	2013
The Crucible by Arthur Miller	Armin Shimerman and Geoffrey Wade	2013
The Liar by David Ives, From the Comedy by Pierre Corneille	Casey Stangl	2013
Top Girls by Caryl Churchill	Cameron Watson	2014
The Curse of Oedipus by Kenneth Cavander	Casey Stangl	2014
Wedding Band: A Love/Hate Story in Black & White by Alice Childress	Gregg T. Daniel	2014
Henry IV, Part One by William Shakespeare	Michael Murray	2015
Picnic by William Inge	Cameron Watson	2015
Uncle Vanya by Anton Chekhov, Adapted by Annie Baker	Robin Larsen	2015
Cloud 9 by Caryl Churchill	Casey Stangl	2016
Hedda Gabler by Henrik Ibsen, In a Version by Andrew Upton	Steven Robman	2016
Cat on a Hot Tin Roof by Tennessee Williams	Cameron Watson	2016/17
As You Like It by William Shakespeare	Rob Clare	2017/18
Les Liaisons Dangereuses by Christopher Hampton, From the Novel by Choderlos de Laclos	Robin Larsen	2017/18
The Hothouse by Harold Pinter	Nike Doukas	2017/18
Native Son by Nambi E. Kelley, Adapted from the novel by Richard Wright	Andi Chapman	2017/18
Three Days in the Country by Patrick Marber, A Version of Turgenev’s A Month in the Country	Andrew Paul	2017/18
The Little Foxes by Lillian Hellman	Cameron Watson	2018/19
The Cripple of Inishmaan by Martin McDonagh	Steven Robman	2018/19
Diana of Dobson's by Cicely Hamilton	Casey Stangl	2018/19
Native Son: Block Party 2019 by Nambi E. Kelley, Based on the Novel by Richard Wright	Andi Chapman	2018/19
The Caucasian Chalk Circle by Bertolt Brecht, Translated by Alistair Beaton	Stephanie Shroyer	2018/19
The Abuelas by Stephanie Alison Walker	Andi Chapman	2019/20
Eight Nights by Jennifer Maisel	Emily Chase	2019/20
Measure for Measure by William Shakespeare	Armin Shimerman & Elizabeth Swain	2019/20
Hamlet by William Shakespeare	Elizabeth Swain	2021/22
Everybody by Branden Jacobs-Jenkins	Jennifer Chang	2022/23
The Changeling by Jennifer Rowland (Audio Play)	Cameron Watson	2022/23
Love and Information by Caryl Churchill	Emily Chase	2022/23
The Tempest by William Shakespeare	Nike Doukas	2022/23
SHE by Marlow Wyatt	Andi Chapman	2023/24
The Winter's Tale by William Shakespeare	Elizabeth Swain	2023/24
Nora - A Stage Version of Henrik Ibsen's A Doll's House by Ingmar Bergman. Translated and Adapted by Frederick J. Marker and Lise-Lone Marker	Cameron Watson	2023/24
Granny, or How To Forgive When You Can’t Forget: A Play in Poems by Natalie Nicole Dressel (Audio Play)	Ann Noble	2023/24
The Importance of Being Earnest by Oscar Wilde	Gigi Bermingham	2024/25
Twelfth Night by William Shakespeare	Armin Shimerman	2024/25
The Glass Menagerie by Tennessee Williams	Carolyn Ratteray	2024/25
Cymbeline by William Shakespeare	Nike Doukas	2025/26
All My Sons by Arthur Miller	Oánh Nguyễn	2025/26
Antigone by Sophokles, newly translated and adapted by Kenneth Cavander	Andy Wolk	2025/26

== Audio Plays at Antaeus ==
The Zip Code Plays - Season One
Title	Written By	Directed By
90011: South Central - Los Angeles	Khari Wyatt	Bernadette Speakes
90272: Pacific Palisades - Annexing the Palisades	Alex Goldberg	Ann Noble
90403: Santa Monica - Plucker	Nayna Agrawal	Jonathan Muñoz-Proulx
90024: Westwood - All Information Herein Is Classified	Deb Hiett	Carolyn Ratteray
91352: Sun Valley - Salvage	Steve Serpas	Julia Fletcher
90012: DTLA - Clara and Serra and The Talking Bear	Angela J. Davis	Steven Robman

The Zip Code Plays - Season Two
Title	Written By	Directed By
90069: West Hollywood - Brunch, Interrupted	Sean Abley	Michael A. Shepperd
90026: Echo Park - $10 and a Tambourine	Mildred Inez Lewis	Gigi Bermingham
90303: Inglewood - The Vig	Paula Cizmar	Bernadette Speakes
91331: Pacoima - Gold & Shine	Khari Wyatt	Saundra McClain
91601: North Hollywood - End of the Line	Peppur Chambers	Gregg T. Daniel
91754: Monterey Park - Bingo Bitches	Elizabeth Wong	Jennifer Chang

The Zip Code Plays - Season Three
Title	Written By	Directed By
91201: Glendale - The Six Pianos of Miradero	Alex Goldberg	Lisa Sanaye Dring
91505: Burbank - True Sound	Steve Apostolina	Gregg T. Daniel
90262: Lynwood - Blue Like You	Ann Noble	Jonathan Muñoz-Proulx
90027: Griffith Park - The Fire In-Between	Peppur Chambers	Rondrell McCormick
90039: Frogtown - Anaxyrus Boreas	Daniel Hirsch	Sara Lyons
90028: Hollywood - Marie Dressler: Good Gal	Diana Burbano	Cameron Watson
