= Rohan O'Grady =

Canadian writer

June Margaret O'Grady Skinner
- Born: 23 July 1922; Vancouver, Canada
- Died: 17 March 2014 (aged 91); West Vancouver, Canada
- Education: Lord Byng High School
- Spouse: Frederick Snowden Skinner
- Writing career
- Pen name: Rohan O'Grady, A. Carleon
- Years active: 1961-1981
- Genres: Fiction, Gothic Fiction
- Notable work: Let's Kill Uncle

Rohan O'Grady was the chief pen name of Vancouver-born Canadian novelist June Skinner (July 23, 1922 – March 17, 2014), who was born June Margaret O'Grady.

== Life ==
June Margaret O'Grady was born in Vancouver on July 23, 1922, to Frederick and Mary O'Grady (nee Ward) and grew up in Point Grey.

As a child O'Grady wrote poetry and short stories.

After graduating from Lord Byng Secondary School in 1940, she worked for the Capilano Golf and Country Club as assistant resident manager, and then in the library at the Vancouver Sun. At the paper she met journalist Frederick Snowden Skinner, who became her husband, and they raised their three children in West Vancouver.

== Writing history ==
Between 1961 and 1970, Skinner published four novels as Rohan O'Grady. Her fifth and final work, The May Spoon, was released in 1981 and credited to A. Carleon (Ann Carleon was the name of Skinner's great-grandmother). Her third book, Let's Kill Uncle, was her most successful and was made into a movie Let's Kill Uncle by the legendary horror-film producer William Castle in 1966, starring Nigel Green, Mary Badham, Pat Cardi and Robert Pickering. First editions of Skinner's second book, Pippin's Journal, are prized by collectors for their illustrations by Edward Gorey.

After nearly three decades of relative obscurity, Skinner returned to public attention as the subject of a January 2009 feature in The Believer, the monthly literary magazine published by McSweeney's. In the piece, "A Certain Kind of Murder," author Theo Schell-Lambert writes of his childhood encounter with Let's Kill Uncle and his search for its mysterious author. Like Shell-Lambert, The Guardian political cartoonist, Martin Rowson, was deeply affected by his childhood reading of Let's Kill Uncle and credits the book for changing his life and influencing his choice of career.

As a result of the Believer article, Let's Kill Uncle was reprinted by Bloomsbury Publishing in 2010 with an endorsement from Donna Tartt; it was released the following year in the United States. The 2014 Spanish edition, Matemos al tio, features a reproduction of the original Let's Kill Uncle cover drawn by Edward Gorey in 1963.

Skinner's books, which are often set in her native British Columbia, are characterized by a strong gothic streak and a tendency to dismiss genre conventions. For example, though she commonly features child protagonists, she subjects them to both emotional intensity and physical violence rarely found in "young adult" novels. This has been attributed in part to Skinner's independence from the larger literary culture. She did not publish her first book until she was nearly 40, and she did her writing alone in suburban West Vancouver while raising three children.

Literary scholar Rebecca A. Brown examines Let's Kill Uncle in the context of black comedy, gothic tropes, and popular culture in her chapter, "Murderous Misfits and Misguided Mentors in Rohan O'Grady's Let's Kill Uncle." Fiction critic Zach Vasquez notes that the novel's "dark whimsy and macabre charm is offset by a cutting and unsentimental look into the psychology of children, as well as the moral compromises we make as adults."

A popular metal band from Perth, Australia, named itself "Let's Kill Uncle" after the movie, and British singer-songwriter Morrissey was also inspired by the film to name his 1991 solo album, Kill Uncle. The film was re-released in 2020 by Kino International.

Pippin’s Journal was re-issued in 2024 and Bleak November in 2025, both by Valancourt Books.

Skinner's literary papers are held by Special Collections and Rare Books: Manuscript Collections, Simon Fraser University, Burnaby, B.C.

== Bibliography ==
- O'Houlihan's Jest, MacMillan, New York 1961. Gollancz, London, 1961.
- Pippin's Journal; Or, Rosemary Is for Remembrance, MacMillan, New York, 1962. Gollancz, London, 1962. (Also published as The Curse of the Montrolfes and The Master of Montrolfe Hall.)
- Let's Kill Uncle, MacMillan, New York, 1963. Longmans, London, 1964. Bloomsbury, London, 2010. Bloomsury, New York, 2011.
- Bleak November, Dial Press, New York, 1970. Michael Joseph, London, 1971.
- The May Spoon, Beaufort, New York, 1981. Methuen, London, 1984. (As A. Carleon.)
