= Rhinoceros (play) =

1959 play by Eugène Ionesco

- Written by: Eugène Ionesco
- Characters: Bérenger; Jean; Logician; Daisy; Botard; Dudard; Papillon; The Boeufs; Townspeople

Premiere
- Date: 1959
- Place: Düsseldorf

Rhinoceros (French: Rhinocéros) is a play by playwright Eugène Ionesco, written in 1959. The play was included in Martin Esslin's essay on post-war avant-garde drama "The Theatre of the Absurd", although scholars have also rejected this label as too interpretatively narrow. Over the course of three acts, the inhabitants of a small, provincial French town turn into rhinoceroses; ultimately the only human who does not succumb to this mass metamorphosis is the central character, Bérenger, a flustered everyman figure who is initially criticized in the play for his drinking, tardiness, and slovenly lifestyle and then, later, for his increasing paranoia and obsession with the rhinoceroses. The play is often read as a response to and criticism of the sudden upsurge of Fascism and Nazism during the events preceding World War II, and explores the themes of conformity, culture, fascism, responsibility, logic, mass movements, mob mentality, philosophy and morality.

== Plot ==
=== Act 1 ===
The play starts in the town square of a small provincial French village. Two friends meet at a coffee shop: eloquent, intellectual and prideful Jean, and the simple, shy, kind-hearted drunkard Bérenger. They have met to discuss an unspecified but important matter. Rather than talk about it, Jean berates Bérenger for his tardiness and drunkenness, until a rhinoceros rampages across the square, causing a commotion. During the discussion that follows, a second rhinoceros appears and crushes a woman's cat. This generates an outrage and the villagers band together to argue that the presence of the rhinoceroses should not be allowed. A discussion about whether they saw two different rhinoceroses or the same one twice leads to a heated argument between Bérenger and Jean, shouting at the top of their voices, eventually causing Jean to walk away in a huff.

Bérenger arrives late for work at the local newspaper office. Daisy, the receptionist, with whom Bérenger is in love, covers for him by sneaking him a time sheet. At the office, an argument has broken out between sensitive and logical Dudard and the violent, temperamental Botard. The latter does not believe a rhinoceros could appear in France.

Mrs. Bœuf (the wife of an employee) says that her husband is unwell and that she was chased all the way to the office by a rhinoceros. Botard scoffs at the so-called "rhinoceritis" movement and says that the local people are too intelligent to be swayed by empty rhetoric. A rhinoceros arrives and destroys the staircase that leads out of the office, trapping all the workers inside. Mrs. Bœuf recognizes the rhinoceros as her husband, transformed. Despite a warning, she joins him by jumping down the stairwell onto her husband’s back. Daisy has called the firemen. The office workers escape through a window.

=== Act 2 ===
Bérenger visits Jean in order to apologize for the previous day's argument. He finds Jean sick and in bed. They argue once more, this time about whether people can transform into rhinoceroses and then about the morality of such a change. Jean is at first against it, then more lenient. Jean begins to gradually transform. Finally, Jean proclaims that they have just as much of a right to life as humans, then says that "Humanism is dead, those who follow it are just old sentimentalists". After transforming fully, he chases Bérenger out of the apartment.

=== Act 3 ===
Bérenger is at home having a nightmare. He fears transforming like Jean did earlier. He has a sip of brandy and retires to bed. Dudard visits him and they have nearly the same exchange as with Jean earlier. Only this time, Dudard is accepting of the transformation and Bérenger resists the idea and denies that he will change.

Daisy arrives with a basket of love. Both Dudard and Bérenger desire her. Botard, Daisy reveals, has also changed. Many villagers, including firemen, have begun to transform. Dudard leaves, wanting to see firsthand. Bérenger tries to stop him. Dudard turns into a rhinoceros himself.

Bérenger laments the loss of Dudard. Daisy tells Bérenger that they have no right to interfere in others’ lives. Bérenger says he will defend her. He blames both himself and Daisy for aiding, through lack of sympathy, the transformations of Jean and Papillon, respectively. Daisy allays his guilt.

The phone rings, but they hear only rhino trumpeting on the line. They turn to the radio for help, but the rhinos have taken that over, too. Bérenger professes his love for Daisy. She seems to reciprocate. They attempt to have a normal life amongst beasts. Bérenger suggests that they attempt to repopulate the human race. Daisy begins to move away from him, suggesting that Bérenger does not understand love. She has come to believe the rhinoceroses are truly passionate.

Bérenger slaps Daisy without thinking and then immediately recants. Bérenger exclaims that, "in just a few minutes we have gone through twenty-five years of married life!" They attempt to reconcile, but once more fight. As Bérenger examines himself in a mirror for any evidence of transformation, Daisy slips away to join the animals.

Now alone completely, Bérenger regrets his actions towards Daisy. In his solitude, he begins to doubt his existence. He attempts to change into a rhinoceros but cannot, then regains his determination to fight the beasts, shouting, "I'm not capitulating!"

== Roles and original casts ==
Role	Odéon Paris 1960	Royal Theatre Bristol 1960	Royal Court Theatre West End 1960	Strand Theatre West End 1960	Longacre Theatre Broadway 1961	Roundabout Theatre Company 2027
Bérenger	Jean-Louis Barrault	Richard Gale	Laurence Olivier	Laurence Olivier	Eli Wallach	John Turturro
Jean	William Sabatier	Michael Mellinger	Duncan Macrae	Duncan Macrae	Zero Mostel	Tony Shalhoub
Daisy	Simone Valére	Annette Crosbie	Joan Plowright	Maggie Smith	Anne Jackson	Tatiana Maslany
Dudard	Gabriel Cattand	Peter Birrel	Alan Webb	Michael Gough	Mike Kellin	
Botard		Ewan Hooper	Peter Sallis	Peter Sallis	Michael Strong	
Papillon	Michel Bertay	Michael Kilgarriff	Miles Malleson	Miles Malleson	Philip Coolidge	
Mrs. Bœuf	Simone Paris	Margaret Jones	Gladys Henson	Gladys Henson	Jean Stapleton	
The Logician	Jean Parédès	Leonard Rossiter	Geoffrey Dunn	Geoffrey Dunn	Morris Carnovsky	
The Old Gentleman	Robert Lombard	Norman Tyrell	Michael Bates	Michael Bates	Leslie Barrett	
The Housewife	Marie-Hélène Dasté	Josephine Tewson	Hazel Hughes	Hazel Hughes	Jane Hoffman	
The Café Proprietor		Michael Lynch	Will Stampe	Will Stampe	Joseph Bernard	
The Waitress	Jane Martel	Claire Pollock	Monica Evans	Monica Evans	Flora Elkins	
The Grocer		Terence Davies	Henry Woolf	Henry Woolf	Dolph Sweet	
The Grocer's Wife		Stephanie Cole	Margery Caldicott	Margery Caldicott	Lucille Patton	
The Fireman		Robin Phillips	Philip Anthony	Philip Anthony	Dolph Sweet	

=== Notable Broadway Replacements ===
Bérenger: Ralph Meeker, Alfred Ryder

Daisy: Dolores Sutton

Dudard: Salem Ludwig

Mrs. Bœuf: Camila Ashland

Logician: Dolph Sweet

Café Proprietor: C. K. Alexander

== Background and meaning ==
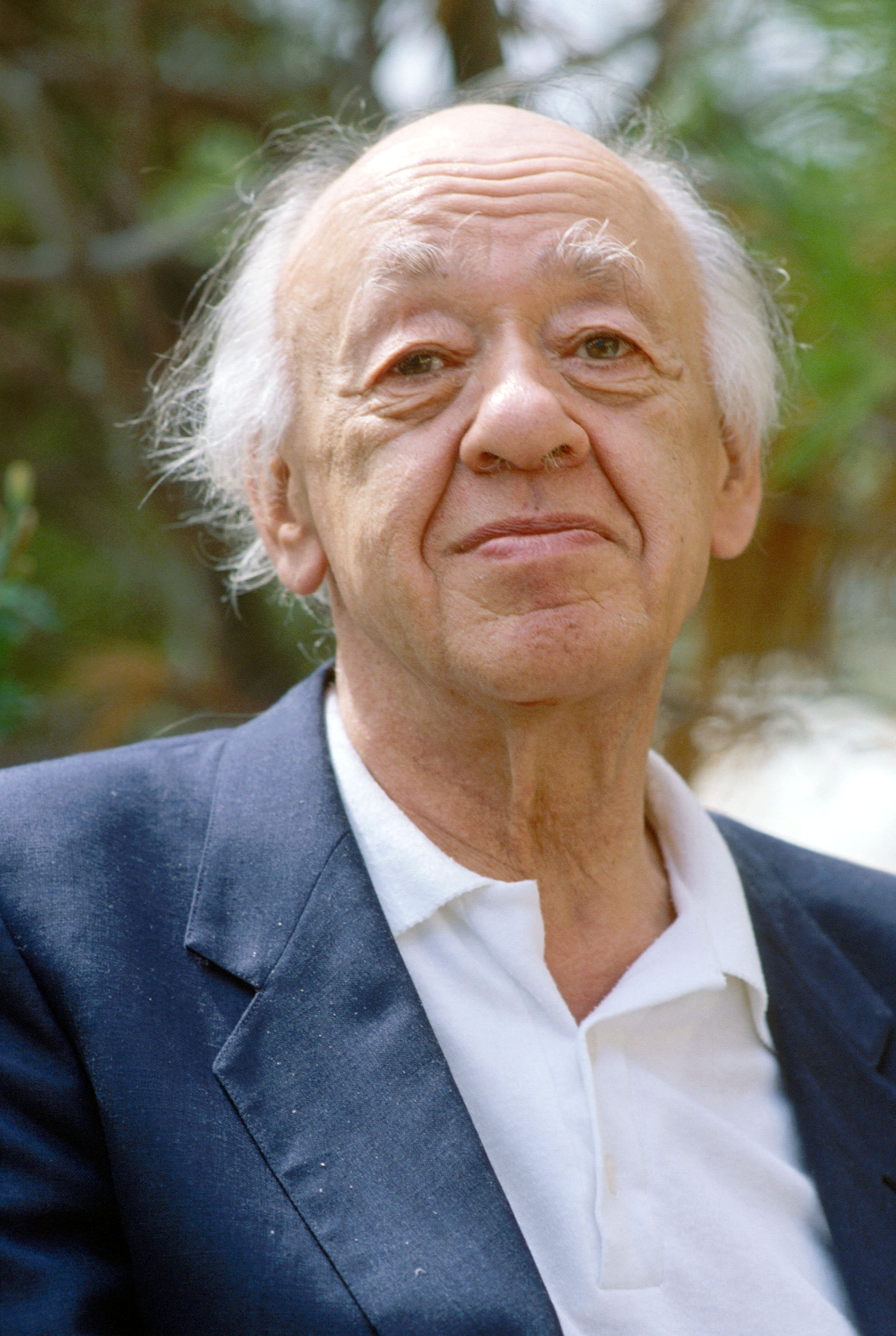
Eugene Ionesco

American scholar Anne Quinney argues that the play was autobiographical, and reflected Ionesco's own youth in Romania. Ionesco was born in Romania to a Romanian father and French mother. Ionesco's father was a Romanian ultra-nationalist of the Orthodox faith with few political scruples, who was willing to support whatever party was in power – while his mother was a French Protestant who came from a family of Sephardic Jews who had converted to Calvinism to better fit into French society. In the increasing antisemitic atmosphere of Romania in the interwar period, being even partly ethnically Jewish was enough to put Ionesco in danger. The Israeli historian Jean Ancel states that the Romanian intelligentsia had a "schizophrenic attitude towards the West and its values," yet considered the West, especially France, to be their role model. At the same time, antisemitism was rampant in Romania.

Most Romanian Jews were descendants of Ashkenazi Jews who had moved to Romania in the 18th and 19th centuries from Poland. A recurring claim of the Romanian radical right was that most Romanian Jews were illegal immigrants or had obtained Romanian citizenship fraudulently. In the 19th century, the newly independent Romanian state proved very reluctant to grant citizenship to Romania's Jews, and a volatile atmosphere of antisemitism flourished with many intellectuals like A. C. Cuza claiming the Jews were a foreign and alien body in Romania that needed to be removed.

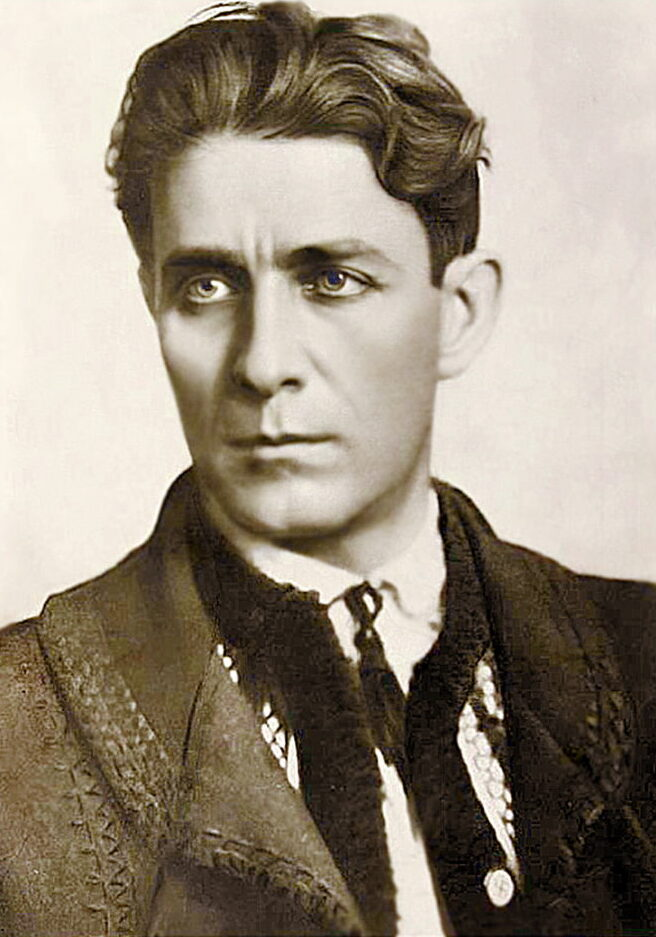
Corneliu Zelea Codreanu

In interwar Romania, the most virulent and violent antisemitic movement was the fascist Iron Guard (formed as the paramilitary branch of the Legion of the Archangel Michael), founded in 1927 by Corneliu Zelea Codreanu. As a university student, Ionesco saw one of his professors, Nae Ionescu, who taught philosophy at the University of Bucharest, use his lectures to recruit his students into the Legion. In an interview in 1970, Ionesco explained the play's message as an attack on those Romanians who become caught up in the "ideological contagion" of the Legion:

University professors, students, intellectuals were turning Nazi, becoming Iron Guards one after another. We were fifteen people who used to get together, to find arguments, to discuss, to try to find arguments opposing theirs. It was not easy ... From time to time, one of the group would come out and say 'I don't agree at all with them, to be sure, but on certain points, I must admit, for example the Jews ...' And that kind of comment was a symptom. Three weeks later, that person would become a Nazi. He was caught in a mechanism, he accepted everything, he became a Rhinoceros. Towards the end, it was only three or four of us who resisted.

In 1936, Ionesco wrote with disgust that the Iron Guard had created "a stupid and horrendously reactionary Romania".

Romanian university students were disproportionately over-represented in the Iron Guard, a fact which rebuts the claim that the Iron Guard attracted support only from social "losers". Romania had a very large intelligentsia relative to its share of the population with 2.0 university students per 1,000 of the population compared to 1.7 per 1,000 of the population in far wealthier Germany, while Bucharest had more lawyers in the 1930s than did the much larger city of Paris. Even before the Great Depression, Romania's universities were turning out far more graduates than there were jobs for, and a mood of rage, desperation and frustration prevailed on campuses as it was apparent to most Romanian students that the middle class jobs that they were hoping for after graduation did not exist. In interwar Romania, Jews played much the same role as Greeks and Armenians did in the Ottoman Empire and the ethnic Chinese minorities do in modern Malaysia and Indonesia, namely a commercially successful minority much resented for their success.

The Legion's call to end the "Jewish colonization" of Romania by expelling all the Jews, who the Legion claimed were all illegal immigrants from Poland, and confiscate their assets so that Christian Romanians could rise up to the middle class, was very attractive to many university students. Codreanu's call for a Romania without individualism, where all Romanians would be spiritually united together as one, greatly appealed to the young people who believed that when Codreanu created his "new man" (omul nou), it would be the moment that a utopian society would come into existence. Ionesco felt that the way in which so many of his generation, especially university students, had abandoned the French ideas about universal human rights in favor of the death cult of the Legion, was a "betrayal" both personally and in a wider political sense of the sort of society Romania should be. As a young writer and playwright in 1930s Bucharest who associated with many leading figures of the intelligentsia, Ionesco felt more and more out of place as he clung to his humanist values while his friends all joined the Legion, feeling much as Bérenger does by the end of Rhinoceros as literally the last human being left on an earth overrun by rhinoceroses. In an interview with a Romanian newspaper shortly before his death in 1994, Ionesco stated how Rhinoceros related to his youth in Romania:

It is true. I had the experience of an extrême droite. And of the second hand left, which had been a radical socialist...Maybe I should have belonged to the left for a while, maybe I should have been of the left before being-not of the right-of the non-left, an enemy of the left. But at a certain moment, the left was no longer the left, at a certain moment the left become a right of horror, a right of terror and that's what I was denouncing, the terror.

In Rhinoceros, all of the characters except Bérenger talk in clichés: for example, when first encountering the rhinoceros, all of the characters apart from Bérenger insipidly exclaim "Well, of all things!", a phrase that occurs in the play 26 times. Ionesco was suggesting that by vacuously repeating clichés instead of meaningful communication, his characters had lost their ability to think critically, and were thus already partly rhinoceros. Likewise, once a character repeats a platitudinous expression such as "It's never too late!" (repeated 22 times in the play) or "Come on, exercise your mind. Concentrate!" (repeated 20 times), the other characters start to mindlessly repeat them, which further shows their herd mentality. In the first act, the character of the logician says: "I am going to explain to you what a syllogism is ... The syllogism consists of a main proposition, a secondary one and a conclusion". The logician gives the example of: "The cat has four paws. Isidore and Fricot have four paws. Therefore, Isidore and Fricot are cats". Quinney sums up the logician's thinking as: "The logic of this reasoning would allow any conclusion to be true based on two premises, the first of which contains the term that is the predicate of the conclusion and the second of which contains the term that is the subject of the conclusion". Based on this way of thinking as taught by the logician, the character of the old man is able to conclude that his dog is in fact a cat, leading him to proclaim: "Logic is a very beautiful thing", to which the logician replies "As long as it is not abused". It is at this moment that the first rhinoceros appears. One of the leading Romanian intellectuals in the 1930s who became close to the Iron Guard was Emil Cioran, who in 1952 published in Paris a book entitled Syllogismes d'amertume (Syllogisms of Bitterness). Emil Cioran severed his friendship with Ionesco, an experience that very much hurt the latter. The character of the logician with his obsession with syllogisms and a world of pure reason divorced from emotion is a caricature of Cioran, a man who claimed that "logic" demanded that Romania have no Jews. More broadly, Ionesco was denouncing those whose rigid ways of thinking stripped of any sort of humanist element led them to inhumane and/or inane views.

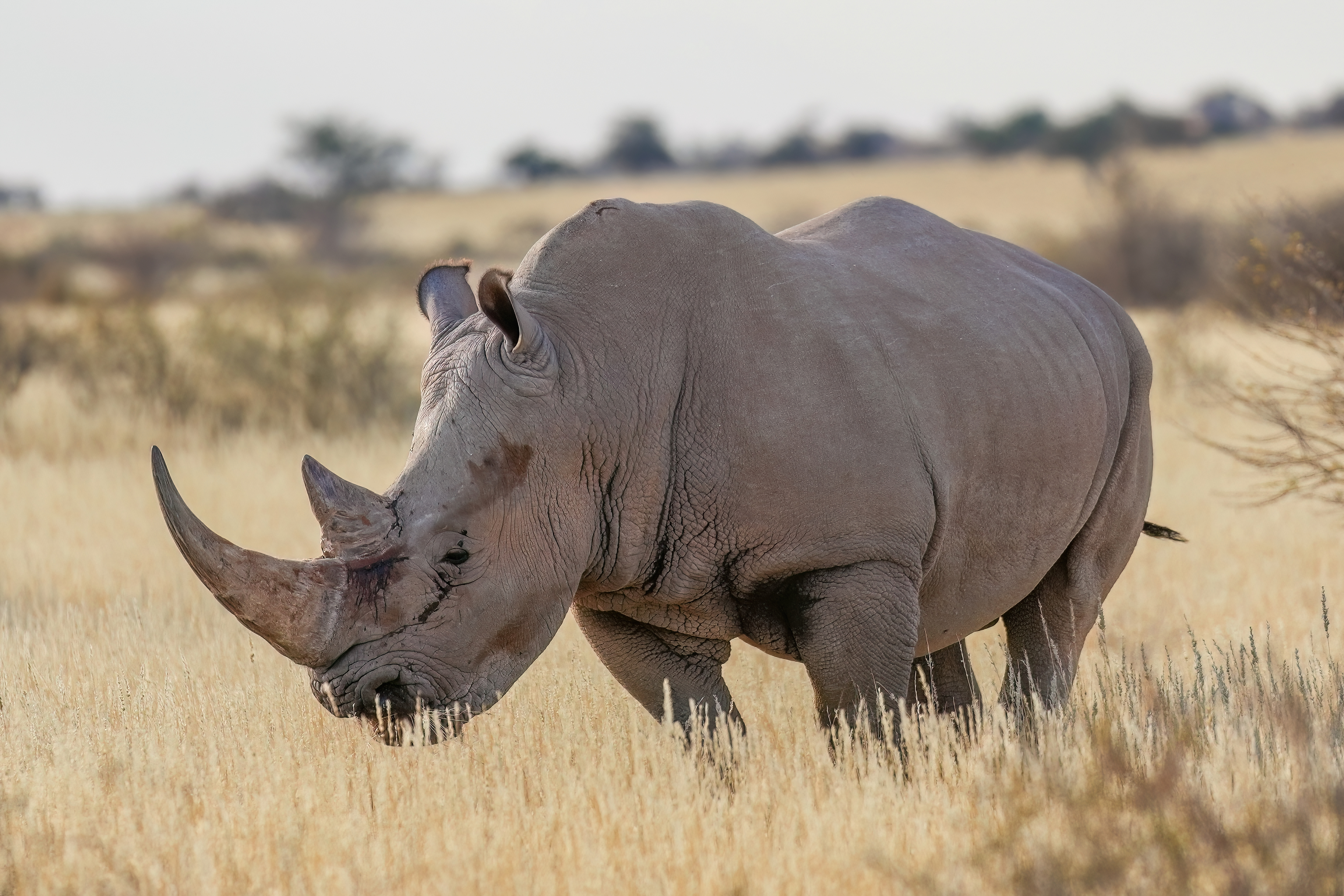
An African rhino with two horns

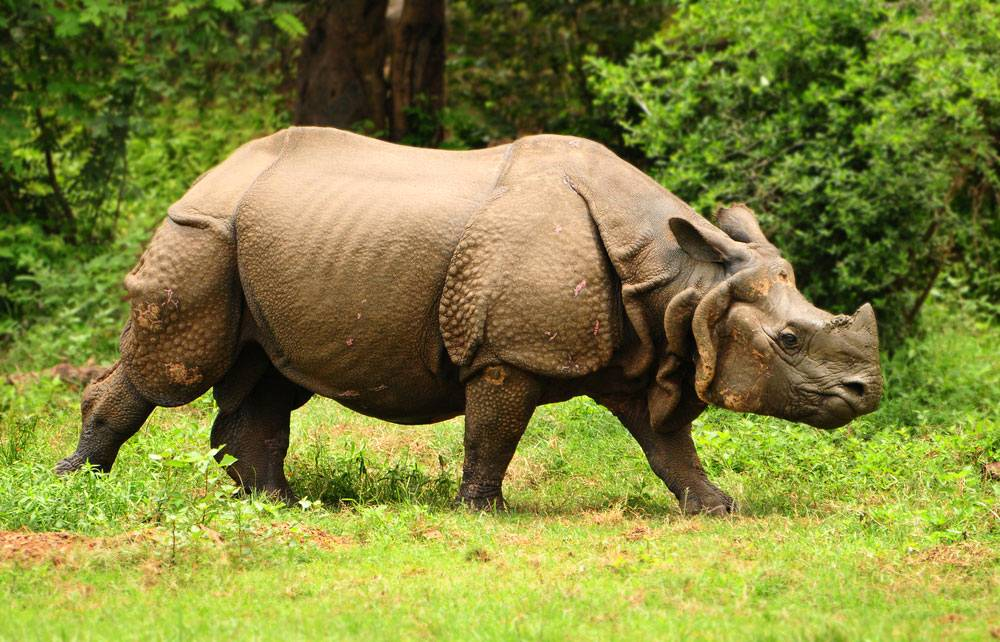
An Indian rhino with a single horn

In the first act of the play, the characters spend much time debating whether the rhinoceroses that have mysteriously appeared in France are African rhinoceroses or Asian rhinoceroses, and which of the two types were superior to the other – a debate that Ionesco meant to be a satire on racism. Regardless of whether the rhinoceros are African or Asian, the French characters comfortably assume their superiority to the rhinoceros; ironically the same people all become rhinoceroses themselves. Bérenger's friend Jean judges the superiority of African vs. Asian rhinoceroses by their number of horns (Note: African rhinoceroses have two horns while Asian rhinoceroses have a single horn.) (making him a caricature of those people who judge other people by the color of their skin) and at one point shouts at Bérenger: "If anybody's got horns, it is you! You are an Asiatic Mongol!" A recurring theme in Nazi propaganda was that the Jews were an "Asiatic" people who were unfortunately living in Europe, a message that many of the French became familiar with during the German occupation of 1940–1944. Ionesco alludes to the atmosphere of that period in his depiction of Jean taunting Bérenger over his supposed horns, and being "Asiatic". Ionesco intended the character of Jean, an ambitious functionary whose careerism robs him of the ability to think critically, to be a satirical portrayal of the French civil servants who served the Vichy government. At various points in the play, Jean shouts out such lines as "We need to go beyond moral standards!", "Nature has its own laws. Morality against Nature!" and "We must go back to primeval integrity!" When Jean says "humanism is all washed up", Bérenger asks: "Are you suggesting we replace our moral laws with the law of the jungle?"

Lines such as these show that Ionesco also created the character of Jean as a satire of the Iron Guard, which attacked all the humanist values of the modern West as "Jewish inventions" designed to destroy Romania, and claimed that there was a "natural law" in which "true" Romanians would discover their "primal energy" as the purest segment of the "Latin race" and assert their superiority over the "lower races". Notably, the more Jean rants about "natural laws" trumping all, the more he transforms into a rhinoceros.

When Romanian nationalism first emerged in the late 18th century – at a time when Transylvania was part of the Kingdom of Hungary and Bukovina of the Austrian Empire, while the Romanians in Moldavia, Wallachia and the Dobruja were ruled by the Ottoman Empire – there was an intense emphasis on the Latinity of the Romanians, who were depicted as a lonely island of Latin civilization in Eastern Europe surrounded by "Slavic and Turanian barbarians". The reference to "Turanian barbarians" was to both the Turks and the Magyars who were both "Turanian" peoples from Asia. This tradition of seeing Romania as a bastion of Latinism threatened by enemies everywhere culminated in the 1930s where the Iron Guard argued there were "natural laws" that determined Romania's struggle for existence, which allowed the Legion to justify any act of violence no matter how amoral as necessary because of the "natural laws". Ionesco parodied the Legion's talk of "natural laws" and "primeval values" by putting dialogue that closely resembled the Legion's rhetoric into Jean as he transforms into a green rhinoceros.

At the same time, Ionesco also attacked in Rhinoceros the French intelligentsia, a disproportionate number of whom were proud members of the French Communist Party in the 1950s. As an anti-Communist Romanian émigré living in France, Ionesco was often offended by the way in which so many French intellectuals embraced Stalinism and would either justify or deny all of the crimes of the Stalin regime under the grounds that the Soviet Union was a "progressive" nation leading humanity to a better future. Ionesco satirized French Communist intellectuals with the character of Botard, who is clearly the most left-wing character in the play. Botard professes himself to be the champion of progressive values, saying about the debate in regards to the debate over the superiority of African vs. Asian rhinoceros that: "The color bar is something I feel strongly about, I hate it!". But at the same time, Botard shows himself to be rigid, small-minded and petty in his thinking, using Marxist slogans in place of intelligent thought. Most notably, Botard is unable to accept the fact of rhinoceritis despite overwhelming evidence of its existence. For an example, Botard dismisses rhinoceritis as: "An example of collective psychosis, Mr. Dudard. Just like religion-the opiate of the people!". Despite seeing the rhinoceroses with his own eyes, Botard convinces himself that rhinoceritis is all a gigantic capitalist plot, dismissing rhinoceritis as an "infamous plot" and "propaganda". Ionesco created the character of Botard as a caricature of French Communist intellectuals who managed to ignore overwhelming evidence of Stalin's terror and proclaimed the Soviet Union to be the "Worker's Paradise", dismissing any evidence to the contrary as mere anti-Soviet propaganda. A further attack on Communism was provided by the character of the pipe-smoking intellectual Dudard. Ionesco stated in an interview that: "Dudard is Sartre". Ionesco disliked Jean-Paul Sartre – France's most famous intellectual in the 1950s – for the way in which he sought to justify Stalin's murderous violence as necessary for the betterment of humanity as a betrayal of everything that a French intellectual should be, and intended the character of Dudard who always finds excuses for the rhinoceros as a caricature of Sartre who always found excuses for Stalin.

Ionesco also intended Rhinoceros as a satire of French behavior under the German occupation of 1940–1944. The green skin of the rhinoceros recalled not only the green uniforms of the Iron Guard, but also the green uniforms of the Ordnungspolizei who enforced German power in France during the occupation. Several French critics when they saw the première of Rhinoceros in 1960 wrote in their reviews that the green skin of the rhinoceros invoked memories of the Occupation, with the Ordnungspolizei in their green uniforms and the Wehrmacht in their muddy-green uniforms. During the Occupation, the French applied nicknames to the Germans that often used the word vert, calling the Germans haricots verts (green beans), sauterelles vertes (green locusts), and race verte (green race). In France during the occupation, the color green was indelibly associated with the Germans.

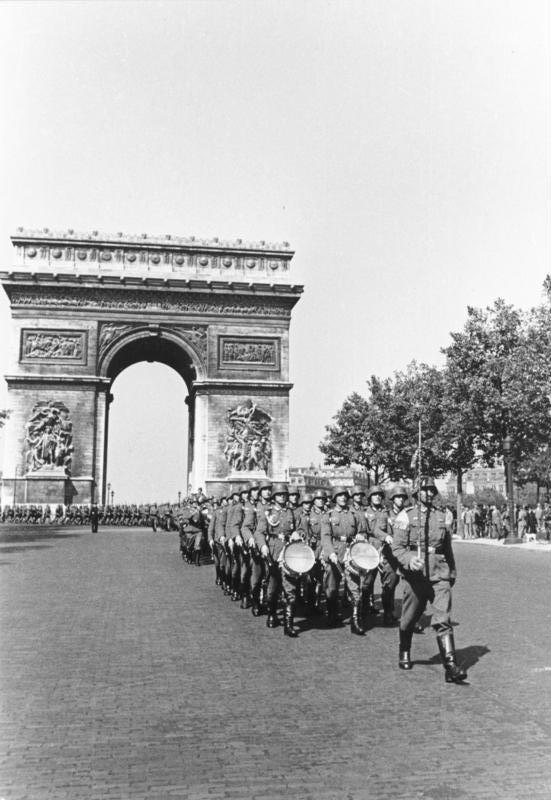
German soldiers march by the Arc de Triomphe on the Champs-Élysées in Paris, June 1940

For the French people, the defeat of June 1940 came as a very profound shock, something that they could never imagine would actually happen. The experience of the Occupation was a deeply psychologically disorienting one for the French as what was once familiar and safe become strange and threatening. Many Parisians could not get over the shock experienced when they first saw the huge swastika flags hanging over the Hôtel de Ville and on top of the Eiffel Tower. The British historian Ian Ousby wrote:

Even today, when people who are not French or did not live through the Occupation look at photos of German soldiers marching down the Champs-Élysées or of Gothic-lettered German signposts outside the great landmarks of Paris, they can still feel a slight shock of disbelief. The scenes look not just unreal, but almost deliberately surreal, as if the unexpected conjunction of German and French, French and German, was the result of a Dada prank and not the sober record of history. This shock is merely a distant echo of what the French underwent in 1940: seeing a familiar landscape transformed by the addition of the unfamiliar, living among everyday sights suddenly made bizarre, no longer feeling at home in places they had known all their lives.

Ousby wrote that by the end of summer of 1940: "And so the alien presence, increasingly hated and feared in private, could seem so permanent that, in the public places where daily life went on, it was taken for granted". At the same time France was also marked by disappearances as buildings were renamed, books banned, art was stolen to be taken to Germany and as time went on, various people, especially Jews, were arrested and deported to death camps.

Afterwards, many of the French learned to accept the changes imposed by the German occupation, coming to the conclusion that Germany was Europe's dominant power and the best that could be done was to submit and bow down before the might of the Reich. The more difficult and dangerous choice of becoming a résistant to the German occupation was taken only by a minority of brave people; estimates of those French who served in the Resistance varied from 2%–14% of the population depending on the historian and what one chooses to define as resistance. Many historians argued that such activities like writing for an underground newspaper, sheltering Jews and Allied servicemen, providing intelligence to the Allies or sabotaging the railroads and factories counts as resistance. Only about 2% of the French population—about 400,000 people—engaged in armed resistance during the Occupation. In Rhinoceros, the characters are shocked and horrified that people are turning into brutal rhinoceros, but during the course of the play learn to accept what is happening, as just the French people were shocked by their defeat in 1940, but many learned to accept their place in the "New Order" in Europe. Dudard expresses collaborationist feelings towards the rhinoceros, saying: "Well, I'm surprised, too. Or rather I was. Now I am getting used to it". Dudard also says of the rhinoceros: "They don't attack you. If you leave them alone, they just ignore you. You can't say they are spiteful". Dudard's statements recall those feelings of the French who were initially shocked to see German soldiers, policemen and the SS marching around their cities and towns in 1940, but swiftly learned that if offered no resistance, the Germans would usually leave them alone to live their lives (provided that they were not Jewish).

Along the same lines, Bérenger wonders "Why us?", asking how rhinoceritis could possibly be happening in France. Bérenger goes on to say:

If only it happened somewhere else, in some other country, and we'd just read about it in the papers, one could discuss it quietly, examine the question from all points of view and come to an objective conclusion. We could organize debates with professors and writers and lawyers, blue-stockings and artists and people and ordinary men in the street as well—it would be very interesting and instructive. But when you're involved yourself, when you suddenly find yourself up against brutal facts, you can't help feeling directly concerned—the shock is too violent for you to stay detached.

Besides alluding to the German occupation, lines such as these also recall Ionesco's youth in Romania in the 1930s. Bérenger, the hard-drinking, slovenly, kindly everyman is regarded as the alter ego of Ionesco. In an interview, Ionesco said:

The rhinoceroses, rhinoceritis and rhinoceration are current matters and you single out a disease that was born in this century. Humanity is besieged by certain diseases, physiologically and organically, but the spirit too is periodically besieged by certain diseases. You discovered a disease of the 20th century, which could be called after my famous play, rhinoceritis. For a while, one can say that a man is rhinocerised by stupidity or baseness. But there are people—honest and intelligent—who in their turn may suffer the unexpected onset of this disease, even the dear and close ones may suffer...It happened to my friends. That's why I left Romania.

Aspects of Bérenger who stubbornly remains human and vows never to give in recall Ionesco's own youth in Romania in the shadow of the Iron Guard. Jean and Dudard both mock Bérenger for weakness because he drinks too much and believes in love which they view as signs of lack of self-control, but Ionesco said about Bérenger that the strength of the modern hero "stemmed from what may be taken for weakness". When Bérenger declares his love for Daisy, it is a sign that he still retains his humanity, despite the way that others mocked him for believing in love. Ionesco wrote during his youth, he had the "strange responsibility" of being himself, feeling like the last (metaphorical) human being in Romania, as "all around me men were metamorphosed into beasts, rhinoceros... You would run into an old friend, and all of sudden, right before your eyes, he would start to change. It was if his gloves had become paws, his shoes hoofs. You could no longer talk intelligently with him for he was not a rational human being". Quinney noted that in both French and English, the word rhinoceros is both a singular and plural term, and argued that Ionesco made people transform into rhinoceros in his play as indicating that when an individual becomes part of a herd mindlessly following others, such a man or a woman lose part of their humanity.

Ionesco chose to stay in Romania to fight against the "rhinocerisation" of the intelligentsia, despite the fact that one by one his friends all become members of the Legion, or refused to talk to him out of cowardice until the regime of General Ion Antonescu passed a law in 1940 that forbade all Jews (defined in racial terms) from participating in the arts in Romania in any way or form. Quinney argued that Ionesco's théâtre de l'absurde plays were a form of "lashing out" against his friends who in his youth had abandoned him for the Legion, and reflected his dual identity as both Romanian and French. Quinney maintained that terror felt by Bérenger at being the last human left in the world reflected Ionesco's own terror as he saw his friends, caught up in youthful idealism, all become Legionnaires, while the rest were either too cynical or cowardly to resist the Legion. Quinney further argued that literary scholars who have seen Ionesco only as a French playwright and neglected the fact that Ionesco saw himself as both Romanian and French have thus overlooked the fact that Rhinoceros was intended as an allegory of and attack on the Legion of the Archangel Michael .

== Productions ==
Rhinoceros had its world premiere in Düsseldorf, North Rhine-Westphalia on November 1, 1959 at Düsseldorfer Schauspielhaus. It was directed by Karl Heinz Stroux and starred Karl-Maria Schley as Bérenger, Joachim Teege as Jean, and Eva Boettcher as Daisy. On its opening night, the theatre gave Ionesco a ten-minute ovation.

On January 25, 1960, the play opened at the Odéon in Paris. It was produced by Jean-Louis Barrault and starred Barrault as Bérenger, William Sabatier as Jean, and Simone Valère as Daisy.

In April 1960, the play was performed by the English Stage Company at the Royal Court Theatre in London, England under the direction of Orson Welles with Laurence Olivier as Bérenger, Joan Plowright as Daisy, and Michael Bates, Miles Malleson and Peter Sallis in the cast. The production moved to the Strand Theatre (now the Novello Theatre) that June. Following the move Dudard and Daisy were played by Michael Gough and Maggie Smith.

In 1961, the American premiere of Rhinoceros opened on Broadway at the Longacre Theatre under the direction of Joseph Anthony. It starred Eli Wallach as Bérenger, Anne Jackson as Daisy, Jean Stapleton as Mrs. Bœuf (Mrs. Ochs in this adaptation), and Zero Mostel, who won a Tony Award for his portrayal of Jean. Wallach was replaced during the run by Alfred Ryder (who also toured with Mostel on the West Coast) and then Ralph Meeker. After Wallach left the show, Mostel took top billing over Ryder and Meeker, all of whom were nonetheless billed above the play's title.

In 1996, the play was revived off-Broadway at Theatre Four, which had previously staged the musical revue Ionescopade, featuring songs and scenes based on the works of Ionesco. It was produced by Herbert Beigel for the Valiant Theatre Company and directed by Michael Murray. It starred Peter Jacobson as Bérenger, Zach Grenier as Jean (John in this translation), and Geoffrey Owens as Dudard.

The Royal Court Theatre revived the play in 2007 and starred Benedict Cumberbatch as Bérenger and directed by Dominic Cooke.

The Bangalore Little Theatre, in collaboration with the Alliance Française de Bangalore, presented Eugene Ionesco’s Rhinoceros, a play in the Theatre of the Absurd tradition. This adaptation is written by Dr. Vijay Padaki, a veteran in theatre.

In 2016 Rhinoceros was adapted and directed by Wesley Savick. It was performed by Modern Theatre in Boston.

In 2023 Theatr Genedlaethol Cymru, the Welsh-language National Theatre, toured a new production of 'Rhinoseros' translated by Manon Steffan Ros and directed by Steffan Donnelly. It starred Rhodri Meilir, Bethan Ellis Owen and Eddie Ladd.

In 2026, American Repertory Theater in Cambridge, Massachusetts, opened their season with a revival of Rhinoceros directed by Diane Paulus. It starred John Turturro as Bérenger, Paul Giamatti as Jean, and Tatiana Maslany as Daisy. On October 15, 2026, Roundabout Theatre Company announced that ART's production would replace their planned revival of The Full Monty and will open at the Todd Haimes Theatre on April 25, 2027. Turturro, Maslany, and Paulus will transfer with the production; Tony Shalhoub will replace Giamatti as Jean, John Tuturro will play Bérenger.

== Adaptations ==
Polish graphic designer Jan Lenica adapted the play into a ten-minute animated short film, which is available on YouTube.

The play was adapted to an urban American setting for a 1973 film (also called Rhinoceros) directed by Tom O'Horgan and starring Zero Mostel as John (Jean in the play), Gene Wilder as Stanley (Bérenger) and Karen Black as Daisy.

The play was also adapted for a 1990 musical, titled Born Again at the Chichester Festival Theatre, by Peter Hall, Julian Barry and composer Jason Carr. The setting was relocated to an American shopping mall. It starred Mandy Patinkin.

The 2008 comedy horror film Zombie Strippers is a loose adaptation of the play, but with zombies instead of rhinoceroses.

== Awards and honors ==
=== Original Broadway production ===
Year	Award ceremony	Category	Nominee	Result
1961	Tony Award	Best Performance by a Leading Actor in a Play	Zero Mostel	Won
1961	Tony Award	Best Direction of a Play	Joseph Anthony	Nominated
1961	Outer Critics Circle Award	Special Award		Won

== "Rhinocerization" ==
The term Rhinocerization (התקרנפות, hitkarnefut) became colloquial in Israel for getting swayed in a nationalistic fervor, or any other general sentiment. It was originally coined by theatre critic Asher Nahor in his review of the play in 1962, which was played at the Haifa Theatre. However, it seems that popular usage followed only after Amos Oz employed the infinitive verb form (להתקרנף, lehitkarnef) ten years later.

One use of "rhinocerization" was by Israeli historian Jean Ancel to describe how Romanian intellectuals were subsumed by the appeal of the Legion of the Archangel Michael in particular and radical antisemitism in general in his 2002 book The History of the Holocaust In Romania.

== Bibliography ==
- Ancel, Jean (1999), Berenbaum, Michael; Peck, Abraham (eds.), "Antonescu and the Jews", The Holocaust and History The Known, the Unknown, the Disputed and the Reexamined, Bloomington: Indiana University Press
- Ancel, Jean (2011), The History of the Holocaust in Romania, Lincoln: Indiana University Press
- Bucur, Maria (2003), "Romania", in Passmore, Kevin (ed.), Women, Gender and Fascism in Europe, 1919–1945, New Brunswick: Rutgers University Press, pp. 57–78
- Crampton, Richard (1997), Eastern Europe in the Twentieth Century-And After, London: Routledge
- Crowdy, Terry (2007), French Resistance Fighter France's Secret Army, London: Osprey
- Hale, Christopher (2011), Hitler's Foreign Executioners: Europe's Dirty Secret, Brimscombe: History Press
- Ousby, Ian (2001), Occupation: The Ordeal of France 1940–1944, New York: CooperSquare Press
- Quinney, Anne (2007). "Excess and Identity: The Franco-Romanian Ionesco Combats Rhinoceritis". South Central Review. 24 (3): 36–52. doi:10.1353/scr.2007.0044. S2CID 154927803.
- Simpson, Christopher (1988), Blowback: America's Recruitment of Nazis and its Effects on the Cold War, New York: Weidenfeld & Nicolson
