= Cameron Watson =

Cameron Watson may refer to:

- Cameron Watson (actor) (born 1961), American actor, screenwriter, and director
- Cameron Watson (soccer) (born 1987), Australian footballer
