= Let's Kill Uncle =

1966 film by William Castle

- Theatrical poster
- Directed by: William Castle
- Written by: Rohan O'Grady; Mark Rodgers
- Produced by: William Castle
- Starring: Nigel Green; Pat Cardi; Mary Badham
- Cinematography: Harold Lipstein
- Edited by: Edwin H. Bryant
- Music by: Herman Stein
- Color process: Technicolor
- Production company: William Castle Productions
- Distributed by: Universal Pictures
- Release date: November 18, 1966
- Running time: 92 minutes
- Country: United States
- Language: English

Let's Kill Uncle—also known as Let's Kill Uncle Before Uncle Kills Us—is a 1966 American black comedy psychothriller film produced and directed by William Castle, about a young boy trapped on an island by his uncle, who is planning to kill him. The boy's only friend is a young girl, who tries to help him.

It stars Nigel Green, Mary Badham, Pat Cardi and Robert Pickering and is based on a 1963 novel written by Rohan O'Grady, the pen name of Canadian author June Margaret O'Grady Skinner. It was filmed in Universal Studios on the largest sound stage, taking advantage of the process screen, with a location shot of a beach in Malibu, California.

== Plot ==
Following the death of multi-millionaire Russell Harrison, his $5 million estate falls to his only child, 12-year-old Barnaby Harrison, who will receive the money upon reaching adulthood. In the meantime, Barnaby will live with his uncle, Major Kevin Harrison, who resides on a remote, sparsely populated island. The major was a war hero, a former British commando whose autobiography, Killing the Enemy, details multiple accounts of extreme close combat. Aboard the boat to the island is Chrissie, who is Barnaby's age. The two children constantly argue, with Chrissie believing Barnaby is telling fantastic lies about his uncle's exploits. Chrissie has come from a broken home and will be living with her Aunt Justine, who also resides on Uncle Kevin's island.

Even after reaching their destination, Barnaby's misbehavior continues. He keeps up a constant litany of tall tales to impress or frighten Chrissie. Barnaby, however, worships his heroic Uncle Kevin and enjoys reading his book. One night, the major, clad in his wartime beret and battledress, awakens Barnaby and takes him on "an adventure". Leading Barnaby to high cliffs overlooking the crashing surf, Harrison hypnotizes Barnaby, planting the suggestion that he walk off the cliffs to his death. But from far below, Aunt Justine spies Barnaby perilously close to the edge of a high cliff and shouts at him, waking him from his trance. A shaken Barnaby believes he was walking in his sleep until Uncle Kevin later jovially explains he meant to kill Barnaby for his inheritance. Though his first attempt failed, he vows he will try again.

Based on Barnaby's previous lies and bad behavior, no one believes his claims of his uncle's persecution. That is, until Chrissie discovers the truth and gleefully suggests they kill uncle before uncle kills Barnaby. The trio begin a series of intricate assassination attempts against each other. Their battle finally ends in a stalemate. As a result, the only harm inflicted is psychological, not physical. But the children are left to reflect on which is worse.

== Cast ==
- Nigel Green as The Uncle – Major Kevin Harrison
- Mary Badham as Chrissie
- Pat Cardi as Barnaby Harrison
- Robert Pickering as Sgt. Frank Travis
- Linda Lawson as Justine
- Ref Sanchez as Ketchman
- Nestor Paiva as Steward
- William Castle as Russell Harrison

== Production ==
The film was William Castle's third and final film for Universal Pictures, with Castle purchasing the film rights for the novel soon after its 1963 publication. Universal's casting director, John Badham, cast his younger sister Mary, who had gained acclaim in the role of Scout in To Kill a Mockingbird (1962). He also chose Pat Cardi, who had recently appeared in Universal's And Now Miguel (1966); Badham and Castle picked Cardi over both Stanley Livingston—then co-starring on My Three Sons—as well as James Mason's son. Nigel Green had recently co-starred in Universal's The Ipcress File (1965) and Let's Kill Uncle was Green's first lead role. Nestor Paiva was suffering from stomach cancer during the production and died the year the film was released.

During filming, Castle had wanted Barnaby to inherit $20 million, although the total had been $10 million in the novel. Universal insisted on $5 million and when Castle objected, MCA Universal head Lew Wasserman came to see Castle himself, telling him, "For $20 million, I'd kill the kid myself".

Cardi recalled that Nigel Green acted as a real life friendly uncle to him on the set, giving him tips on performing. Cardi admitted that the tarantulas frightened him, so during rehearsals plastic spiders were used, even though both the spider wrangler and Castle told him the real spider had been defanged and was harmless. When shooting the actual scenes, the real tarantula was present, with Castle asking Cardi, "wouldn't it be fun to drop it on Nigel's chest?" Green was unenthusiastic until Castle told him that Sean Connery had a real tarantula walk on his chest in Dr. No (1962). Green shouted, "If it's good enough for Connery, it's good enough for me!", and did the scene without complaint, unaware that Connery actually had a tarantula walk over a glass pane rather than on his naked skin.

Cardi stated that several endings were shot for the film and "Universal picked the worst one", adding that there "were a lot of politics going on with the film".

== Release ==
The film was censored in the UK to obtain an A rating. No information is available from the BBFC on what was removed.

=== Home media ===
In June 2020, a restored version of the film was released on Blu-ray by Kino Lorber.

== Reception ==
Howard Thompson of The New York Times was unreceptive to the film, writing, "Say this for Let's Kill Uncle. It's the least bad chiller ever made by William Castle [...] [who's] paced the film like molasses."

== In popular culture ==
English singer-songwriter Morrissey referenced this film in the title of his 1991 album Kill Uncle.

== See also ==
- List of American films of 1966
