= Cincinnati Playhouse in the Park =

Regional theatre in the United States

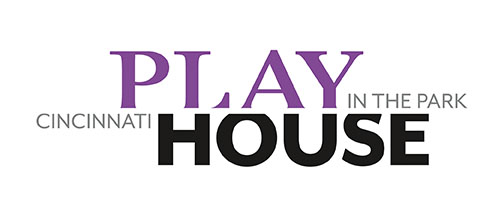
- Interactive map of Cincinnati Playhouse in the Park
- Address: 962 Mt. Adams Circle; Cincinnati, Ohio; United States
- Coordinates: 39°6′40.42″N 84°29′51.88″W
- Event: Theatre

Construction
- Opened: October 10, 1960; 65 years ago

Website
- cincyplay.com

The Cincinnati Playhouse in the Park is a regional theatre in Cincinnati, Ohio. It was founded in 1959 by college student, Gerald Covell, and was one of the first regional theatres in the United States. Located in Eden Park, the first play that premiered at the Playhouse, on October 10, 1960, was Meyer Levin's Compulsion. The Playhouse has brought prominent plays to Cincinnati and has hosted national premieres such as Tennessee Williams' The Notebook of Trigorin, in 1996, and world premieres such as the Pulitzer Prize-nominated, Coyote on a Fence, in 1998, and Ace, in 2006.

The Playhouse facility comprises two theatres, the Rouse Theatre and the Rosenthal Shelterhouse Theatre. The Playhouse is a member of the League of Resident Theatres.

== Leadership ==
In 1973–1975, the Playhouse was the first professional regional theatre to be led by Harold Scott, an early leader of the regional theatre movement. Scott was followed by Michael Murray, who was artistic director at the Playhouse until 1985.

The Cincinnati Playhouse was under the leadership of Edward Stern (Producing Artistic Director) and Buzz Ward (Executive Director) between 1992 and 2012. Ward came to the Playhouse from Yale University, where he led the Yale Repertory Theatre in the late 1980s. In 2012, Blake Robison became artistic director and Buzz Ward was promoted to managing director. In the summer of 2021, Ward retired.

== Awards ==
In 2004, the Playhouse received a Tony Award for Best Regional Theatre. In 2007, the Playhouse received a second Tony Award for their revival of Company, which won Best Revival of a Musical. The production was directed by John Doyle, and also won Drama Desk, Outer Critic's Circle and Drama League Awards for Best Revival of a Musical.
