= Harold Scott (director) =

American stage director and actor (1935–2006)

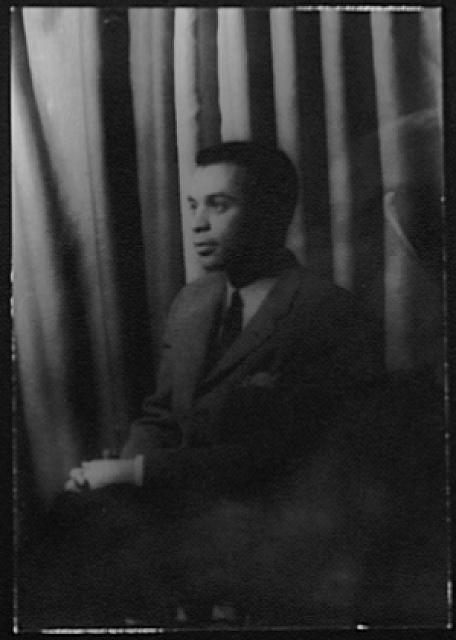
- Harold Scott (1959); Photograph by Carl Van Vechten
- Born: 6 September 1935; Morristown, New Jersey
- Died: 16 July 2006 (aged 70); Newark, New Jersey

Harold Russell Scott Jr. (6 September 1935–16 July 2006) was an American stage director, actor and educator, who broke racial barriers in American theatre. Scott first became known for his work as an electrifying stage actor with a piercing voice, and later as an innovative director of numerous productions throughout the country, from Broadway to the Tony Award-winning regional theatre, the Cincinnati Playhouse in the Park, where he was the first African-American artistic director in the history of American regional theatre.

== Life and career ==
Scott was born in Morristown, New Jersey. His mother was a housewife and his father, Harold Russell Scott Sr., was a general practitioner. Scott was educated at Phillips Exeter Academy and Harvard. He had a career as a stage director on Broadway and Off-Broadway, but began as an actor of note, performing in Jean Genet's The Blacks and an acclaimed production of the premiere of The Death of Bessie Smith by Edward Albee. Winner of the Obie Award for acting in Jean Genet's Deathwatch in 1959, Scott also played on Broadway in The Cool World.

Scott was chosen by Elia Kazan to be an original member of the Repertory Theater of Lincoln Center, where he performed in Arthur Miller's After the Fall and Incident at Vichy, and was cast by José Quintero in Thomas Middleton's Changeling and Eugene O'Neill's Marco Millions. In 1984, Scott returned to Off-Broadway to play Brutus in a modern dress production of Shakespeare's Caesar with the Riverside Shakespeare Company at The Shakespeare Center under the direction of W. Stuart McDowell.

Scott staged numerous innovative productions in New York and at regional theatres, including Morgan Freeman in The Mighty Gents on Broadway in 1978, and Avery Brooks in Paul Robeson on Broadway twice: in 1988 and again in 1995. Scott also directed the twenty-fifth anniversary production of A Raisin in the Sun, with Esther Rolle. This production opened at the Roundabout Theatre in New York; it then broke box-office records at the Kennedy Center in Washington, DC. Scott's production received nine National Theater Awards from the NAACP, including best director, and was filmed for public television's Great Performances.

Scott was head of the directing program at the Mason Gross School of the Arts, at Rutgers, the State University of New Jersey.

In 1980, he taught acting classes at The Peterborough Players in Peterborough, NH. During this time, he performed as Don Pedro in Much Ado About Nothing, appeared in A Streetcar Named Desire, and substituted for an actor in Garson Kanin's Born Yesterday. He served as Staff Director from 1981–85, associate director from 1985–88, and Acting Artistic Director from 1989–90 at the same theater.

In February 2006, Scott directed his final play, Yellowman, an examination of black-on-black prejudice, at the Cincinnati Playhouse in the Park, where in 1973, he began a two-year appointment as artistic director. He was the first African-American to have earned such in a major regional theatre. He died in Newark New Jersey in 2006 of complications from heart failure
