= Our Frank =

Single by Morrissey

from the album Kill Uncle
- B-side: "Journalists Who Lie"; "Tony the Pony"
- Released: 11 February 1991
- Studio: Hook End Manor (Oxfordshire, England)
- Length: 3:25
- Label: His Master's Voice (UK)
- Songwriters: Morrissey; Mark E. Nevin
- Producers: Clive Langer; Alan Winstanley

Morrissey singles chronology
"Piccadilly Palare" (1990)	"Our Frank" (1991)	"Sing Your Life" (1991)

Alternative cover
- Cover of US CD

Professional ratings
Review scores
Source	Rating
AllMusic	2/5 stars

"Our Frank" is a song by the English singer Morrissey, released on 11 February 1991 by His Master's Voice as the lead single from his second solo studio album, Kill Uncle (1991). Written by Morrissey and Mark E. Nevin and produced by Clive Langer and Alan Winstanley, the single peaked at number 26 on the UK Singles Chart. Retrospective commentary has described the track as a buoyant, sardonic opener to Kill Uncle that plays to Morrissey’s wry lyrical persona.

It was the lowest any Morrissey single had charted since his first release "Suedehead" in 1988. The accompanying video shows Morrissey singing by himself while elsewhere skinheads run through a city centre and a park. The video was not included on the 1992 The Malady Lingers On video compilation.

== Critical reception ==
Commenting on the reissue of Kill Uncle, Marc Hogan of Pitchfork characterized "Our Frank" as a "buoyant alt-pop opener" whose sardonic lyric voice sets the album's tone. Ned Raggett at AllMusic was more reserved, writing that the title track "isn't all it could be."

== Track listings ==
=== 7" vinyl and cassette ===
1. "Our Frank"
2. "Journalists Who Lie"

=== 12" vinyl ===
1. "Our Frank"
2. "Journalists Who Lie"
3. "Tony the Pony"

=== CD ===
1. "Our Frank"
2. "Journalists Who Lie"
3. "Tony the Pony"

Country	Record label	Format	Catalogue number
UK	His Master's Voice	7" vinyl	POP1625
UK	His Master's Voice	12" vinyl	12POP1625
UK	His Master's Voice	Compact disc	CDPOP1625
UK	His Master's Voice	Cassette	TCPOP1625

== Release ==
The single was issued in multiple UK formats, including 7-inch (POP 1625), 12-inch (12POP 1625), CD (CDPOP 1625) and cassette (TCPOP 1625).

=== Etchings ===
Original UK vinyl pressings included etched run-out messages, including a Wilde-referencing pun noted in retrospective coverage of the album era.

== Musicians ==
- Morrissey – vocals
- Mark E. Nevin – guitar
- Nawazish Ali Khan – violin
- Seamus Beaghen – piano
- Mark "Bedders" Bedford – bass guitar
- Andrew Paresi – drums

== Live performances ==
The song was performed live by Morrissey on his 1991 Kill Uncle tour. Along with all of the material from Kill Uncle, "Our Frank" has never been performed by Morrissey since the 1991 tour, until 1 July 2022 in Las Vegas when he also debuted five songs.

== Music video ==
The promotional video for "Our Frank" was directed by John Maybury and intercuts performance footage with scenes shot around London’s King's Cross area.

== Charts ==
Chart (1991)	Peak position
UK Singles (OCC)	26
UK Airplay (Music Week)	48
