= Rhinoceros (Orson Welles production) =

- Original language: French
- Written by: Eugène Ionesco; Derek Prouse (translation)
- Genre: Theatre of the Absurd

Premiere
- Date: 1959 (Original Paris production); April 28, 1960 (this production)
- Place: Royal Court Theatre, London (this production)
- Directed by: Orson Welles

Rhinoceros was a 1960 production of Eugène Ionesco's play of the same name, which had been written the year before. It was the first English-language production of the play, starred future husband-and-wife team Laurence Olivier and Joan Plowright, and was directed by Orson Welles. Olivier also co-produced the play, which was Welles's last work as a theatre director.

== Production ==
In March 1960, Welles's play Chimes at Midnight had just closed after an unsuccessful run in Dublin, dashing his hopes of transferring to London. But the commercial failure of the play made that impossible, and Welles sought a new project. He was approached by his de facto British agent Wolf Mankowitz with an offer to direct Rhinoceros. In later years, he admitted to one biographer that he had been mainly motivated by the chance to work with Olivier, whom he had long admired, but that he thought "It's a terrible play. I hate it...But I wanted to do it because of Larry." He told another biographer "I didn't like the play. I agreed to it because I thought the gimmick was good enough so that you could invent an evening in the theatre about it. And it worked - it always seems to work everywhere no matter how it's done. But throughout rehearsals, every day, it seemed to me I liked Ionesco less as a playwright."

In this production, the play was relocated from a busy Paris street to a London pub, with a highly elaborate set filled with swinging doors, trapdoors, television monitors, trick mirrors, and advanced special effects.

As well as directing the play, Welles also designed the set, costumes, lighting and sound effects. The production was troubled, with Olivier and Welles clashing in their interpretations of the play. Welles described "The way [Olivier] got me in this was to take all of my directions like a perfect soldier, never argue with them, and always do them...and he took every actor aside and told them I was misdirecting them. Instead of making it hard for me to direct him, he made it almost impossible for me to direct the cast. He got them off in little groups and had quiet little rehearsals having nothing to do with me." Olivier then repeated something he had done to John Gielgud who was directing him in a play several years earlier - he told Welles in front of the entire cast that the director should not return to future rehearsals, as he was upsetting them all so much - Welles recalled "He told me to stay home, and I did! I was so humiliated and sick about it that you can't imagine. I had to come for the dress rehearsal because I'd designed the sets, and I had to supervise that, and light it, and so on...[but] I never went back to the play. They changed the cast, and they had Maggie Smith in, and they had Alan Bates, and they moved to another theatre. But I didn't go to rehearsals. All those actors think very badly of me because they think that I simply wasn't interested - I was so humiliated, I didn't know how to come back!...He's the leader of the English stage, he's playing the leading role, and directing it all the time! What was I going to do? Yes, it was a black moment." After over thirty years of directing plays, it was Welles's last assignment as a theatre director, even though he was to live another 25 years.

Welles's absence in the run-up to the play's dress rehearsal meant that several technical issues with lighting and sound effects were not resolved in time for the play's opening. Accordingly, at the opening night, Welles rigged up a microphone on the right-hand aisle of the dress circle, sat there, apologised to the audience for the experience of theatre never being complete, and then during the performance he proceeded to give lighting directions and instructions to the actors, i.e. "Louder, louder...Take down the music...Now lift the curtain...Now, now. Faster!...More rhino roars! More...That's it."

The play opened at the Royal Court Theatre, London, on 28 April 1960, where it played until 7 June. On 8 June, it transferred to the Strand Theatre, until it finally closed on 30 July.

Olivier and Plowright had fallen in love during the making of The Entertainer earlier that year, although Olivier was still married to Vivien Leigh, and the affair of the two actors first became public during the play's run, when Leigh announced her husband wanted a divorce, causing a minor scandal at the time.

== Cast ==
- Bessie . . . Monica Evans
- Berenger . . . Laurence Olivier
- John . . . Duncan Macrae
- A Grocer . . . Henry Woolf
- Grocer's Wife . . . Margery Caldicott
- Lady with a Cat . . . Hazel Hughes
- A Logician . . . Geoffrey Lumsden
- An Old Gentleman . . . Michael Bates
- A Publican . . . Will Stampe
- Daisy . . . Joan Plowright (at Royal Court Theatre) / Maggie Smith (at Strand Theatre)
- Duddard . . . Alan Webb (at Royal Court Theatre) / Michael Gough (at Strand Theatre)
- Mr. Butterfly . . . Miles Malleson
- Bottard . . . Peter Sallis
- Mrs. Beef . . . Gladys Henson
- A Fireman . . . Philip Anthony

(Both Joan Plowright and Peter Sallis had acted in Welles's previous London stage play, Moby Dick—Rehearsed, in 1955.)

== Reception ==
Despite the chaos behind the scenes, the production received strong reviews, with Olivier's performance being singled out, and its run was extended from the initial five weeks that had been booked. Welles noted, "We made a lot of money out of that production, and the critics liked it."

== Orson's Shadow (1999) ==
In 1999, Austin Pendleton (who had worked as an actor with Welles on the 1969 film Catch-22), wrote the play Orson's Shadow about the 1960 production of Rhinoceros, focussing on the rival egos of Olivier and Welles. The play premiered in Chicago in January 2000, and has subsequently had numerous revivals in Britain and America, most notably in an off-Broadway production directed by David Cromer in 2005 which ran to 349 performances.
