= This Property Is Condemned =

1966 film by Sydney Pollack

- Theatrical release poster by Frank McCarthy
- Directed by: Sydney Pollack
- Screenplay by: Francis Ford Coppola; Fred Coe; Edith Sommer
- Based on: This Property Is Condemned; 1946 play by Tennessee Williams
- Produced by: John Houseman; Ray Stark
- Starring: Natalie Wood; Robert Redford; Charles Bronson; Kate Reid; Mary Badham
- Cinematography: James Wong Howe
- Edited by: Adrienne Fazan
- Music by: Kenyon Hopkins "Wish Me a Rainbow" written by Jay Livingston and Ray Evans
- Production company: Seven Arts Productions
- Distributed by: Paramount Pictures
- Release date: August 3, 1966
- Running time: 110 minutes
- Country: United States
- Language: English
- Budget: $4.62 million
- Box office: $2.6 million (est. US/ Canada rentals)

This Property Is Condemned is a 1966 American drama film directed by Sydney Pollack and starring Natalie Wood, Robert Redford, Kate Reid, Charles Bronson, Robert Blake, and Mary Badham. The screenplay, inspired by the 1946 one-act play of the same name by Tennessee Williams, was written by Francis Ford Coppola, Fred Coe, and Edith Sommer. The film was released by Paramount Pictures.

The Depression-era story takes place in the fictional Mississippi town of Dodson. Owen Legate (Redford), a representative of the railroad that provides much of the economic base for the town, comes to Dodson on an unpopular errand. Wood plays Alva Starr, a pretty flirt who finds herself stuck in the small town and is attracted to the handsome stranger. For her performance, Wood received a Golden Globe nomination for Best Actress in a Motion Picture Drama. However, the film received mixed reviews.

The film is noted for its song "Wish Me a Rainbow", written by Jay Livingston and Ray Evans, which is heard at the beginning and the ending of the film. Ed Ames, Astrud Gilberto, and Lawrence Welk have all recorded cover versions.

== Plot ==
Willie Starr, an unkempt girl, tells the story of her sister Alva to Tom, a boy whom she meets on the abandoned railroad tracks of Dodson, Mississippi, in the 1930s.

Her story begins with a stranger, Owen Legate, arriving in the small town of Dodson and making his way to the Starr boarding house, where a loud birthday party is in progress for the landlady, Mrs. Hazel "Mama" Starr. He meets Willie, the youngest daughter of the house, and rents a room for the week, while remaining mysterious about his reasons for being in town. The men at the party, including a conductor named Mr. Johnson, eagerly await Mama's oldest daughter, Alva. When Alva finally appears, the men compete for her attention, including J.J., Mama's boyfriend.

Alva and Owen meet in the kitchen, where she tells a story about a worker who took her dancing at the Peabody Hotel in Memphis. Willie is entranced, but Owen suspects that the story is fictitious. Alva obviously is eager to leave Dodson and dreams of going to New Orleans, from whence Owen has come. Later, Alva enters Owen's room on a false pretense and confides in him. He discourages her, suggesting that she is no more than a prostitute, and she leaves in tears. Mama explains to Alva that she must be kind to Mr. Johnson, who has promised to look after her.

The next day, Willie, who is skipping vacation Bible school, sees Owen on his way to work. The purpose of Owen's visit to Dodson is to close the uneconomical Dodson branch line and release several railroad employees. In the evening, Mr. Johnson is again waiting for Alva to get ready for their date, but she is avoiding it. She makes an excuse to bring him inside and then leads Owen into the garden to show him her father's red-headed scarecrow. Owen confronts Alva about her arrangement with Mama, which Alva denies. She runs back angrily to Mr. Johnson and invites everyone in the house to join her swimming in the nude. J.J. finds Alva alone and makes advances to her. He tells her that Owen has come to deliver layoffs to most of the town. The workers grow increasingly hostile toward Legate, but Owen and Alva eventually become closer. They visit an abandoned train car decorated by Alva's father, and Alva talks once again of her dream to leave the town. When Owen is beaten by the men, Alva takes care of him, and they spend the night together.

Meanwhile, Mama has arranged for the family to accompany Mr. Johnson to Memphis, where he will take care of them. She will not let Alva go to New Orleans with Owen. When Alva protests, Mama persuades Owen to believe that he has been deceived and that Alva was planning to go to Memphis all along. Mama, J.J., Alva, and Mr. Johnson celebrate their new arrangement. Drunk and angered, Alva confronts J.J. and forces him to admit that he stays with Mrs. Starr to be with her. That night, Alva marries J.J., but the next morning, she steals his money and their marriage license and flees to New Orleans.

In New Orleans, Alva eventually finds Owen, and they share happy days together. When Owen is offered a job in Chicago, he proposes marriage to Alva and sends for Willie, but one day, the two come home to find Mama, who wants to reclaim Alva and involve her in a new scheme. She reveals to Owen that Alva had married J.J., but Owen is incredulous. Alva runs out into the rain, crying. Willie finishes telling her story to Tom on the railroad tracks. Willie, who now wears her sister's clothes and jewelry, explains that Alva has died. Mama has left with a man, and Willie lives alone in the abandoned boarding house.

== Cast ==
- Natalie Wood as Alva Starr
- Robert Redford as Owen Legate
- Charles Bronson as J.J. Nichols
- Kate Reid as Hazel Starr
- Mary Badham as Willie Starr
- Alan Baxter as Knopke
- Robert Blake as Sidney
- Dabney Coleman as Salesman (scenes deleted)
- John Harding as Johnson
- Ray Hemphill as Jim
- Brett Pearson as Charlie
- Jon Provost as Tom
- Bob Random as Tiny
- Quentin Sondergaard as Hank
- Mike Steen as Max
- Bruce Watson as Lindsay Tate

== Production ==
The play had been performed on television in 1958 starring Zina Bethune in Three by Tennessee.

Film rights were owned by Ray Stark of Seven Arts, who had enjoyed a big success making a film of Tennessee Williams' Night of the Iguana. The script was written by Francis Ford Coppola, who was then under contract with Seven Arts. He had directed the play in college. The film was originally going to star Elizabeth Taylor and be directed by Richard Burton (who had been in Iguana), with Taylor to be paid $1 million. Seven Arts set up the film at Paramount as part of a slate of productions; others included The Man Who Would Be King, Oh Dad Poor Dad, Assault on a Queen, My Last Duchess, and Where the Tiger Sleeps. Both Taylor and Burton, though, dropped out of the project. The lead role instead went to Natalie Wood, and she approved Sydney Pollack as director.

Ray Stark offered the job of producing to John Houseman. It was the first film Houseman had produced where he joined the project after the lead star had already been selected and the script had already been written. Houseman wrote in his memoirs, "[A]ll important decisions on the picture would be made by Stark, who (though he could not have been more thoughtful and pleasant) was in the habit of making them capriciously, unilaterally, and often without informing anyone until long after they had gone into effect." Houseman says Sydney Pollack tried to force him out of the film, and that five different writers worked on the script.

Filming took place partly on location in Bay Saint Louis, Mississippi, and New Orleans. Houseman wrote, "Some of our footage, particularly the scenes between Natalie and her mother, had real dramatic quality, and Bronson lent his own special kind of energy to a scene at the water hole. But our love scenes (the combined product of five well-paid Hollywood writers) made little sense."

The locomotive used in the film was Reader Railroad No. 1702. Today, it now operates excursions on the Great Smoky Mountains Railroad.

== Reception ==
=== Critical response ===
In a contemporary review for The New York Times, critic Bosley Crowther called the film "as soggy, sentimental a story of a po' little white-trash gal as ever oozed from the pen of Tennessee Williams or out of the veins of scriptwriters in Hollywood", and felt that the two main characters were "wholly implausible."

Variety called it "handsomely mounted, well-acted... adult without being sensational, and touching without being maudlin."

In the 21st century, FilmInk argued the film "is fatally sunk by continued attempts to make Redford’s character sympathetic."

=== Accolades ===
Award	Category	Nominee	Result
Golden Globe Awards	Best Actress in a Motion Picture – Drama	Natalie Wood	Nominated
Laurel Awards	Top Female Dramatic Performance	Natalie Wood	Nominated

== See also ==
- List of American films of 1966
