= Ref Sanchez =

American photographer and actor

- Born: 1917; Arizona
- Died: 1986 (aged 68–69)
- Other name: Refugio Sanchez
- Occupations: Actor, photographer

Ref Sanchez (born Refugio Sanchez, 1917–1986) was an American actor who appeared mostly in television shows in smaller acting parts. He worked as a fashion photographer in the 1950s through the 1970s.

== Early life ==
Sanchez was the son of Cruz Sanchez and Julia Sanchez, both from Durango, Mexico. The family migrated from Mexico to Los Angeles, bringing with them older brother Jose Guadalupe. After arriving in Los Angeles the family grew to include siblings Josefina, Pablo (Paul), and Manuela Helen (Nellie). Sanchez attended Los Angeles schools and graduated from Lincoln High School. He attended trade schools and Los Angeles City College. Sanchez was stationed in the Philippines and Guam during World War II, where he took photographs of the native people and outdoor scenes.

== Photography ==
After the war Sanchez started his own photography studio in Hollywood. He worked on fashion assignments for Los Angeles department stores such as May Company, Robinsons, and Bullocks. Sanchez also did other types of fashion photography as well as publicity shots.

== Television and film ==
Sanchez was working on studio still shots when he got the opportunity to do small parts on TV shows such as Bonanza, Maverick, Alias Smith and Jones, Get Smart, Baretta, and a few other shows. He appeared in the movie Let's Kill Uncle before Uncle Kills Us (1966) and in the Woody Allen picture Everything You Always Wanted to Know About Sex* (*But Were Afraid to Ask) (1972).

== Legacy ==
Sanchez died in 1986 of brain cancer, and left behind a widow named Virginia. In October 2005 his photo collection, spanning a career of forty years, was donated to California State University, Northridge, through the efforts of his niece Patricia Keener and Sesar Carreno, an alumnus of CSUN. The Ref Sanchez photo collection is housed at Cal State Northridge Library in the Urban Studies Center.
