= Jennifer Chang =

American poet and scholar

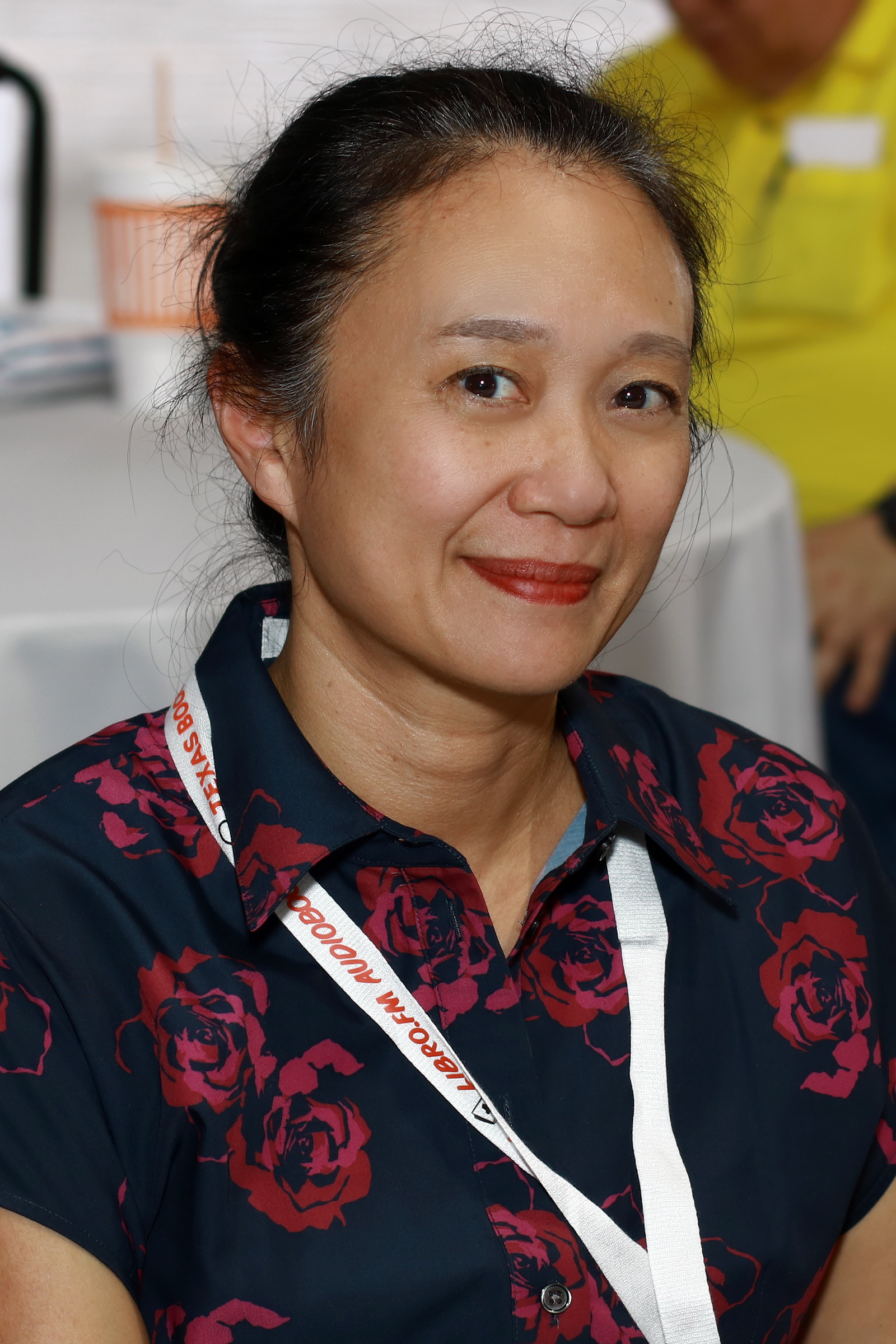
- Chang at the 2024 Texas Book Festival.
- Born: New Jersey
- Education: BA University of Chicago, MFA University of Virginia, PhD University of Virginia
- Writing career
- Notable works: The History of Anonymity (2008), Some Say the Lark (2017)

Jennifer Chang is an American poet and scholar.

== Life and career ==
Jennifer Chang was born in New Jersey. She earned a BA from the University of Chicago in 1998, and an MFA from University of Virginia in 2002, where she returned to pursue a PhD and received her degree in 2017.

Her poems have been published in The American Poetry Review, The Best American Poetry 2012, The Nation, The New Yorker, Poetry, and A Public Space.

Chang's debut collection of poetry, The History of Anonymity, was published in 2008 by the University of Georgia Press. This collection of lyrical poems was an inaugural selection for the VQR's (Virginia Quarterly Review) Poetry Series and a finalist for the Shenandoah/Glasgow Prize for Emerging Writers.

Her second book, Some Say the Lark, was published by Alice James Books in 2017. It was longlisted for the 2018 PEN Open Book Award and won the 2018 William Carlos Williams Award.

Chang's third collection of poems, An Authentic Life, published by the Copper Canyon Press in 2024, was a finalist for both the National Book Critics Circle Award for Poetry and the Pulitzer Prize in Poetry.

She was an assistant professor of English and creative writing at George Washington University.She is now an associate professor at the University of Texas at Austin.

Chang is co-chair of the advisory board for Kundiman, an organization dedicated to the creation and cultivation of Asian American literature.

== List of Selected Works ==
=== Poetry collections ===
- —— (2008). The History of Anonymity (paperback 1st ed.). Athens, GA: University of Georgia Press. ISBN 9780820332093.
- —— (2017). Some Say the Lark (paperback 1st ed.). Farmington, ME: Alice James Books. ISBN 9781938584664.
- —— (2024). An Authentic Life (paperback 1st ed.). Port Townsend, WA: Copper Canyon Press. ISBN 9781556596995.

=== Poems ===
- "Pastoral" (2008)
- "The Skin's Broken Aria" (2010)
- "Sonogram" (2010)
- "Again a Solstice" (2010)
- "Freedom in Ohio" (2013)
- "Patsy Cline" (2015)
- "Dorothy Wordsworth" (2016)
- "A Horse Named Never" (2017)
- "On Emotion" (2017)
- "The World" (2017)

== Awards and honors ==
- 2026 Kingsley Tuffs Poetry Award
- 2025 Library of Virginia Award in Poetry
- The 2025 Pulitzer Prize Finalist in Poetry
- Henry Hoyns Fellowship, University of Virginia
- 2018 Winner of the William Carlos Williams Award
- Winner of the Virginia Quarterly Review's Poetry Series, for The History of Anonymity
- Finalist for the Shenandoah/Glasgow Prize for Emerging Writers, for The History of Anonymity
- 2005 Van Lier Fellowship in Poetry at the Asian American Writers’ Workshop
- 2005 Louis Untermeyer Scholarship at Bread Loaf Writers' Conference
- 2005 Selection for Best New Poets
- MacDowell Colony Fellowship
- Djerassi Resident Artists Program
