= Kill Uncle =

Studio album by Morrissey
- Released: 4 March 1991
- Recorded: 1990–1991
- Studios: Hook End Manor (Oxfordshire, England)
- Genres: Alternative rock; glam rock; rockabilly
- Length: 33:02
- Label: His Master's Voice
- Producers: Clive Langer; Alan Winstanley

Morrissey chronology
Bona Drag (1990)	Kill Uncle (1991)	At KROQ (1991)

Singles from Kill Uncle
- 1. "Our Frank" Released: 11 February 1991; 2. "Sing Your Life" Released: 1 April 1991

2013 remaster cover

Kill Uncle is the second solo studio album by the English alternative rock singer Morrissey, released on 4 March 1991 by EMI Records and His Master's Voice. The title comes from the black comedy film Let's Kill Uncle (1966). The album was preceded by the single "Our Frank".

== Recording ==
Kill Uncle was recorded during a transitional phase for Morrissey, having parted ways with record producer Stephen Street but not yet working with his future long-term team of guitarists Alain Whyte and Boz Boorer. The album was produced by Clive Langer and Alan Winstanley with most of the music written by Fairground Attraction's guitarist Mark E. Nevin.

== Content ==
The opening track, "Our Frank", describes "frank and open, deep conversations" that get the singer nowhere and leave him disheartened. The final verse, however, sees Morrissey singing "Won't somebody stop me from thinking? From thinking all the time. So deeply, so bleakly ...", which critic David Thompson interprets as indicating that the conversations he so dreads are in fact with himself.

"Asian Rut" tells of the murder of an Asian boy by three English boys, in which Morrissey's vocals are backed only by strings, bass, and sound effects. The song continues the trope of Morrissey writing about English racism from a unique angle, as with "Bengali in Platforms" on his debut solo studio album Viva Hate (1988).

"Sing Your Life" has Morrissey encouraging the listener to express themselves, as he sings, "Walk right up to the microphone and name all the things you love, all the things you loathe." A rockabilly version of the song also exists, recorded live at KROQ-FM in Los Angeles after Morrissey started working with new guitarists Boz Boorer and Alain Whyte.

"Mute Witness" tells of an attempt to get information out of a shocked witness who cannot speak at a trial, featuring piano backing composed by Clive Langer. "King Leer" follows, a relaxed tune with sardonic lyrical puns. "Found Found Found", another Langer track, is the only heavy song on the album. Morrissey sings that he's found "someone who's worth it in this murkiness" but ends complaining this person is "somebody who wants to be with me... all the time".

"Driving Your Girlfriend Home" is a ballad in which Morrissey tells of driving home the girlfriend of an unspecified person. He reveals she asks him, "'How did I end up so deeply involved in the very existence I planned on avoiding?'" and that "She's laughing to stop herself crying." These outpourings are interspersed with directional instructions. Morrissey tells us "I can't tell her" the answer to her question and that the ride concludes with them "shaking hands goodnight so politely."

The next track, "The Harsh Truth of the Camera Eye", is often cited as Morrissey's most misunderstood song. The lyric is describing the "pain because of the strain of smiling" and the dichotomy between one's public image and private personality. The music consists of a carnival-like synthesizer and also features sound effects like a door slamming and a camera shutter snapping, along with piano accompaniment.

In "(I'm) The End of the Family Line", the singer rues he will never have children, an insult into the "fifteen generations... of mine" that produced him. The lyric is complemented by a subdued guitar backing, and ends with a similar 'false' fadeout similar to such Smiths songs as "That Joke Isn't Funny Anymore".

The original album closes with "There Is a Place in Hell for Me and My Friends", a simple piano piece that reflects the existential longing of the album and showcases Morrissey's torch song influence.

== Release ==
Kill Uncle was released on 4 March 1991 by record labels EMI and His Master's Voice.

"Our Frank", the album's lead single and opening track, reached No. 26 in the UK Singles Chart and No. 2 in the US Modern Rock Tracks chart. "Sing Your Life" was also released as a single, reaching No. 33 in the UK and No. 10 on the US Modern Rock Tracks chart.

On 5 February 2013, Morrissey announced the reissue of the album, along with a remastered version of his 1989 single "The Last of the Famous International Playboys", both to be released 8 April as part of an ongoing Morrissey reissue campaign by Parlophone. The album was available as a gatefold CD and heavyweight gatefold LP, and both the picture disc single and album featured new cover artwork.

The 2013 edition includes the additional tracks "East West" and "Pashernate Love", replaces "There's a Place in Hell for Me and My Friends" with the version from the live EP At KROQ, and rearranges the running order. The press release mentioned that "the album has a revitalised quality, which accentuates some of its more subtle, experimental qualities and nuances; in particular, some of the more unusual musical styles which Morrissey explored for the first time".

== Critical reception ==
Professional ratings
Review scores
Source	Rating
AllMusic	2/5 stars
Chicago Tribune	3/4 stars
Entertainment Weekly	A−
Los Angeles Times	2.5/4 stars
NME	8/10
Pitchfork	6.0/10
Q	2/5 stars
Rolling Stone	2/5 stars
Select	4/5
The Village Voice	B+

In a review rated eight out of ten, NME praised the album saying: "Kill Uncle is a collection of songs that are both very good and like nothing much else in pop. They range every which way across styles and themes and still they sound like only Morrissey could have sung them". NME then placed the album at number 25 on their best fifty albums of 1991 list. In a four-out-of-five square review, Select hailed it as "a pleased and pleasing work", adding "the album's only problem" was "it all ends too soon", nevertheless dubbing it "a success". In a negative review, Mat Snow in Q magazine described it as "further evidence of woodworm in the creative rafters" and highlighted the short running time of the album.

In the US, Entertainment Weekly published a glowing review, saying: "repeated listens reveal an oddly queasy charm. And there are plenty of cuts like ”Our Frank” that recall the strange perkiness of early-’70s hits from the arty British group Roxy Music." Assesing the lyrics, reviewer Jim Farber wrote that Morrissey "offers some of his most artful expressions of discomfort ever". He concluded by promising the readers: "the record will hook you". In a retrospective review, Stephen Thomas Erlewine of AllMusic panned the album, describing it as "Morrissey's least distinguished record" with "neither melody nor much wit". Mark Hogan of Pitchfork wrote that the album "is best appreciated as a campy celebration of the decorative and artificial."

== Track listing ==
All lyrics are written by Morrissey; all music is composed by Mark E. Nevin, except where noted.

Kill Uncle track listing
No.	Title	Music	Length
1.	"Our Frank"		3:25
2.	"Asian Rut"		3:22
3.	"Sing Your Life"		3:27
4.	"Mute Witness"	Clive Langer	3:32
5.	"King Leer"		2:55
6.	"Found Found Found"	Langer	1:59
7.	"Driving Your Girlfriend Home"		3:23
8.	"The Harsh Truth of the Camera Eye"		5:34
9.	"(I'm) The End of the Family Line"		3:30
10.	"There's a Place in Hell for Me and My Friends"		1:52
Total length:			33:02

US bonus track
No.	Title	Length
11.	"Tony the Pony"	4:11

2013 expanded edition
No.	Title	Length
1.	"Our Frank"	3:22
2.	"Sing Your Life"	3:20
3.	"Mute Witness"	3:31
4.	"King Leer"	2:55
5.	"Asian Rut"	3:19
6.	"Pashernate Love"	2:19
7.	"East West"	2:33
8.	"Found Found Found"	1:58
9.	"Driving Your Girlfriend Home"	3:18
10.	"The Harsh Truth of the Camera Eye"	5:34
11.	"There's a Place in Hell for Me and My Friends (At KROQ Version)"	2:20
12.	"(I'm) The End of the Family Line"	3:27
Total length:		37:56

== Personnel ==
Credits are adapted from the Kill Uncle liner notes.

Musicians

- Morrissey – vocals
- Mark E. Nevin – guitar
- Mark Bedford – bass guitar
- Andrew Paresi – drums; percussion
- Seamus Beaghen – keyboards
- Steven Heart – keyboards
- Nawazish Ali Khan – violin
- Linder Sterling – backing vocals

Production and artwork

- Alan Winstanley – production
- Clive Langer – production
- Simon Metcalfe – engineering assistance
- Gino Sprio – sleeve photography
- Jo Slee – sleeve art coordinator

== Charts ==
Chart performance for Kill Uncle
Chart (1991)	Peak position
Australian Albums (ARIA)	45
Canada Top Albums/CDs (RPM)	53
Dutch Albums (Album Top 100)	61
New Zealand Albums (RMNZ)	30
Swedish Albums (Sverigetopplistan)	27
UK Albums (Official Charts)	8
US Billboard 200	52

== Certifications ==
Certifications for Kill Uncle
Region	Certification	Certified units/sales
United Kingdom (BPI)	Silver	60,000^{^}
^{^} Shipments figures based on certification alone.
