= Mary Badham =

American actress (born 1952)

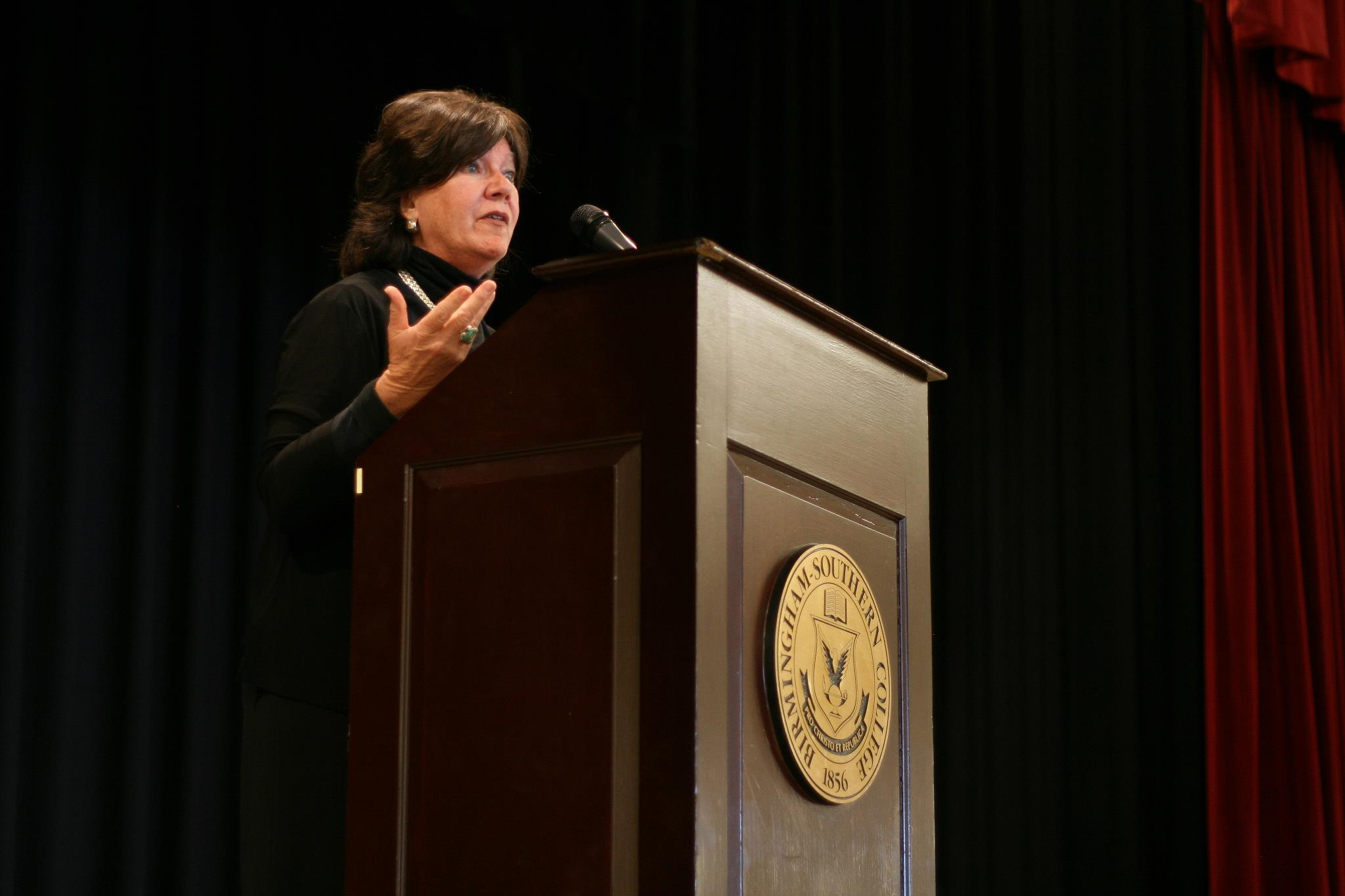
- Mary Badham speaking at Birmingham-Southern College in 2012
- Born: October 7, 1952 (age 73); Birmingham, Alabama, U.S.
- Occupations: Actress, art restorer
- Years active: 1962–1966, 2005, 2022–present
- Spouse: Richard Wilt (m. 1975)
- Children: 2
- Relatives: John Badham (brother)

Mary Badham (born October 7, 1952) is an American actress who portrayed Jean Louise "Scout" Finch in To Kill a Mockingbird (1962), for which she was nominated for an Academy Award for Best Supporting Actress. At the time, Badham (aged 10) was the youngest actress ever nominated in this category.

== Career ==
Mary Badham had no film acting experience before being cast in To Kill a Mockingbird. The Oscar in her category went to another child actress, Patty Duke, for The Miracle Worker. During filming, Badham became particularly close to actor Gregory Peck, who played Scout's father, Atticus Finch; she kept in contact with him, always calling him "Atticus" until his death in 2003. Peck called her "Scout" in return.

Badham played Sport Sharewood in "The Bewitchin' Pool", the final episode of the original Twilight Zone series. She also appeared in the films This Property Is Condemned and Let's Kill Uncle before retiring from the acting profession.

In 2005, at the urging of actor/writer/director Cameron Watson, Badham came out of retirement to play an offbeat cameo opposite Keith Carradine for his film Our Very Own. Watson stated he would not accept any other actress for the part. He had managed to contact her in Monroeville, Alabama, where she had been invited to attend a stage version of To Kill a Mockingbird. Badham made her tour debut as a stage actor portraying Mrs. Dubose in the U.S. national tour of Aaron Sorkin's stage adaptation of To Kill a Mockingbird on March 27, 2022.

== Personal life ==
Badham is the younger sister of director John Badham.

As of 2014, Badham was an art restorer and a college testing coordinator. She is married to Richard W. Wilt, dean of Library and Educational Support Services at Lehigh Carbon Community College, and the mother of two children. She has traveled around the world recalling her experiences making To Kill a Mockingbird, while expounding the book's messages of tolerance and compassion.

In 2012, she attended a screening of To Kill a Mockingbird with President Barack Obama at the White House to mark the 50th anniversary of its release. In 2015, she defended the release of Harper Lee's first draft of Go Set a Watchman and its portrayal of an older, more bigoted, Atticus Finch.

== Filmography ==
Mary Badham film and television work
| Year | Title | Director | Role | Notes |
|---|---|---|---|---|
| 1962 | To Kill a Mockingbird | Robert Mulligan | Jean Louise "Scout" Finch | |
| 1963 | Dr. Kildare | Elliot Silverstein | Cora Sue Henty | |
| 1964 | The Twilight Zone | Joseph M. Newman | Sport Sharewood | "The Bewitchin' Pool" |
| 1966 | This Property Is Condemned | Sydney Pollack | Willie Starr | |
| 1966 | Let's Kill Uncle | William Castle | Chrissie | |
| 1998 | Fearful Symmetry | Charles Kiselyak | Herself | Documentary on To Kill a Mockingbird |
| 2005 | Our Very Own | Cameron Watson | Mrs. Nutbush | |
| 2015 | Earl Hamner Storyteller | Ray Castro Jr | Herself | Documentary |
| 2019 | Erasing His Past | Jared Cohn | Barbara | |
| 2024 | Was Once a Hero | Michael Tuthill | Nurse Mary | |

== Awards and nominations ==
| Year | Organization | Category | Work | Result | Ref. |
|---|---|---|---|---|---|
| 1963 | Academy Awards | Best Supporting Actress | To Kill a Mockingbird | Nominated | |

== See also ==
- List of oldest and youngest Academy Award winners and nominees - Best Supporting Actress, Youngest Nominees
