= Cameron Watson (actor) =

American actor (born 1961)

- Born: October 6, 1961 (age 64); Louisville, Kentucky, U.S.
- Occupations: Television actor, screenwriter, film director, theatre director
- Website: cameron-watson.com

Cameron Watson (born October 6, 1961) is an American actor, screenwriter, and director. His first role was Bart Fallmont in the 1991 TV miniseries Dynasty: The Reunion.

Watson attended the University of Montevallo, receiving a bachelor of fine arts degree in 1983. After graduation, he began a professional acting career in New York City, studying with Herbert Berghof at the HB Studio in Greenwich Village and working in off-Broadway productions. He later moved to Los Angeles to act in film and television.

Watson wrote and directed his first feature film, Our Very Own, in 2005. The film starred Allison Janney, Keith Carradine, Jason Ritter, Cheryl Hines, Hilarie Burton and Mary Badham (who played "Scout" in To Kill a Mockingbird, in her first screen role in 40 years).

Watson's TV acting credits include Cheers, Ned & Stacey, Frasier, Caroline in the City, Profiler, Six Feet Under, CSI: Miami, The King of Queens, and NYPD Blue.

On January 1, 2026, Watson became the artistic director for Skylight Theatre Company in Los Angeles.

As of January 2019, Watson lives in the Hollywood Hills with his partner, writer and producer Steve Cubine.
