= Michael Murray (director) =

Michael Murray (born March 31, 1932) is an American stage director, producer and educator. He is one of the early leaders of the Regional Theatre Movement. Murray was co-founder of the Charles Playhouse in Boston, MA. and served as its Artistic Director for eleven years (1957–1968). Murray was the Artistic Director of the Cincinnati Playhouse in the Park (1975–1985). In addition, he directed productions Off-Broadway in New York and at many regional theaters, including the Hartford Stage Company, Center Stage Baltimore, the Philadelphia Drama Guild, and the Huntington Theatre Company. He held the position of Chair of the Theatre Arts Department of Brandeis University (1986–2003).

== Early career ==
In 1955 Murray was a directing student in the MFA program at Boston University. That year José Quintero, stage director and a founder of the Circle in the Square Theatre in New York, directed a play at the University. Murray was assigned to be his stage manager. Quintero then hired him to be stage manager of his Circle in the Square production of Eugene O'Neil's The Iceman Cometh, which opened on May 8, 1956. That production has been acclaimed as a landmark event in theatre history and made a star of Jason Robards.

In late 1957 Murray returned to Boston and became involved in the Actors Company, started by fellow students from Boston University including Olympia Dukakis and John Cazale. This evolved into the Charles Playhouse, which Murray co-founded the same year with producing partner Frank Sugrue. Murray was Artistic Director, co-producer and directed most of the productions until he left the company in 1968. During that time, members of the company and other actors who appeared at the Charles include Al Pacino, Jill Clayburgh, Jane Alexander, Ned Beatty, Christina Pickles, Swoosie Kurtz, and Mitch Ryan.

== Michael Murray and the Regional Theatre Movement ==
In his book, Regional Theatre: the Revolutionary Stage, Joseph Wesley Zeigler distinguishes the Regional Theatre Movement from the "little theatres" of the 1920s, community theatre organizations, and professional theatres that were established in towns and cities across America during the last half of the twentieth century. The Regional Theatre Movement, in the late 1940s and 1950s, was the work of a small number of directors, actors and producers to develop a new expression of professional theatre as an alternative to Broadway. "The early regional theatres ... started as reactions to the theatrical Establishment of their time – Broadway ... They were the new, anti-Establishment revolution."

Zeigler identifies the Charles Playhouse as one of six theatres which were the foundations of the Regional Theatre Movement. He described the humble beginnings of the movement's leaders and their theatres: "Zelda Fichandler (Arena Stage, Washington, DC) in a beer factory, Michael Murray (Charles Playhouse, Boston) above a fish market, or Jules Irving and Herbert Blau (the Actor's Workshop, San Francisco) behind a judo academy."

In 1958, the Charles Playhouse moved from the fish market to an abandoned nightclub on Warrenton Street. Today, the Charles Playhouse no longer operates as a regional theatre, but continues as a venue for theatrical productions.

== Awards ==
- 1997 - Distinguished Alumni Award, Boston University, College of Fine Arts, School of Theatre
- 1984 - Mayor of Cincinnati, Ohio, honoring cultural contribution to the city
- 1962 - Rodgers and Hammerstein Award, Boston

== Personal life ==
Michael Murray was born in Washington DC. He holds a BA degree from Catholic University. He received an MFA (1955) from the Boston University.
