= Unity for Gallaudet =

Protest movement

The Unity for Gallaudet Movement was a 2006 protest movement started by students, faculty, and alumni of Gallaudet University and other sympathizers who did not support the nomination of Dr. Jane Fernandes as the 9th president of the university.

Gallaudet University's 8th president I. King Jordan, who was brought into the office as a result of the Deaf President Now Movement, announced he was retiring at the end of 2006. His successor was narrowed to three final candidates. Jane Fernandes was named president; the two that were eliminated were Ronald Stern and Stephen Weiner.

Many of the protesters objected to Fernandes stating that she lacked the charisma needed to lead the global deaf community. Critics of the protest, including Fernandes and Jordan, claimed that the protestors felt Fernandes was "not deaf enough," because despite being born deaf, and having a deaf mother and brother, she did not learn American Sign Language (ASL) until adulthood.

Ultimately, these protests resulted in the Board of Trustees rescinding Fernandes's appointment. The board subsequently appointed Robert Davila as the college's interim president for the following two years.

== Controversy ==
Following her selection for president in spring 2006, Jane Fernandes faced opposition from a mixture of students, staff, and alumni at Gallaudet University.

Objections included concerns that Fernandes was a divisive figure who had already alienated a significant portion of the faculty and staff during her 11 years at Gallaudet. Critics of the selection process raised concerns about the lack of diversity among the finalists, that outgoing president Jordan had played too active a role in picking his successor, and about the circumstances surrounding Fernandes's original appointment as provost by Jordan six years prior.

Fernandes, on the other hand, attributed much of the opposition to deaf identity politics. Though she is deaf, she was raised among hearing peers and did not learn American Sign Language, which is widely used at Gallaudet, until her twenties.

== Fall 2006 protest ==
On 20 September 2006, the Gallaudet Student Congress passed a resolution stating that they did not recognize Jane Fernandes as the 9th president of Gallaudet University.

Ryan Commerson, LaToya Plummer, Leah Katz-Hernandez, and Delia Lozano-Martinez were Faculty, Students, Staff, and Alumni (FSSA) spokespersons. Chris Corrigan was described as the "Mayor of Tent City" and largely responsible for rallies. In his role as Student Body Government president, Noah Beckman, and Tara Holcomb, as Student Body Government's Director of Ethics and Conduct, emerged as strong voices for the students the SBG represented. The participation of former SBG president/alumna Tawny Holmes and graduate student Erin Moran was also critical. They encouraged the students to speak out about Dr. Jane K. Fernandes as the 9th president. During October, Commerson essentially filled the role as the democratic leader, with Holmes as the active alumnus leader and Moran as the coordinator of Tent City. Alumnus Sean Moore was also involved in organizing the impetus to move forward the protest activities. Plummer was key in negotiations with the DC police and the Fernandes transition administration.

On October 1, 2006, Tent City was in the process of being revived by students when they ran into problems. Campus workers had put down a highly concentrated liquid fertilizer called Earth Juice. The administration claimed that the fertilizing was planned. The next day, the Tent City was revived to protest the 9th president selection. Eventually the students seized the Hall Memorial Building (HMB), and locked it down in order to prevent any classes from resuming and force the university administration to the negotiation table.

On October 6, 2006, officers from the Department of Public Safety raided the Hall Memorial Building to break up the lockdown. The students later alleged that the officers assaulted several students. I. King Jordan ordered an independent investigation.

On October 12, 2006, police were called in to arrest the students.

== Black Friday: October 13, 2006 ==
Marking a historical moment in Gallaudet history, 133 protesters were arrested for civil disobedience by the 6th Street gate on October 13, now known as "Black Friday." The arrests were due to insistent orders by Jordan to the reluctant DC police, who tried to avoid as much involvement with the arrests because, in their words, "Those students aren't doing anything wrong." While thousands of alumni and Gallaudet supporters watched, both via the internet and in person, each protester was quietly picked up and carried by campus security officers across the line separating the campus from the public street of DC into a DC Police van. Protest leaders went first, followed by waves of students, alumni, and prominent community members. Tim Rarus, one of the 1988 Deaf President Now leaders, was one of the first people arrested. Just before being arrested, he shouted, "I helped put you in office, now you're arresting me!".

== Aftermath ==
National Association of the Deaf's president Bobbie Beth Scoggins of Kentucky cut her vacation short and flew in to declare NAD's support of the students' demands.

On October 19, 2006, the Washington Post reported that "[o]f the 20 trustees, three of whom are members of Congress, perhaps as many as seven do not support Fernandes becoming president". This article was the catalyst in shaking the Board of Trustees up and creating unease in their firm stand to not condone the protest for the first time.

On October 21, 2006, more than 4,000 people from around the nation attended a protest march to the Capitol, in Washington D.C.

On October 29, 2006, the Board of Gallaudet withdrew its appointment of Fernandes, without naming an alternative.

In an opinion piece in The Washington Post, Jordan defended the appointment of Fernandes. Jordan denounced the board's decision and the actions of the protesters, saying, "I am convinced that the board made a serious error in acceding to the demands of the protesters by terminating Fernandes's presidency before it began."

On December 10, 2006, the Board of Trustees announced that Robert Davila would serve as interim president for up to two years. He was formally installed on May 9, 2007, during a ceremony that included a speech by D.C. Congressional Delegate Eleanor Holmes Norton, who spoke positively of the 2006 protest. He stepped down on December 31, 2009.

On June 29, 2007, in the aftermath of the controversy over the university's presidency, Gallaudet was temporarily placed on probation by its accreditation organization, the Commission on Higher Education of the Middle States Association of Colleges and Schools. It was also reported that in 2006, the Office of Management and Budget had found that "Gallaudet failed to meet its goals or showed declining performance in key areas, including the number of students who stay in school, graduate and either pursue graduate degrees or find jobs upon graduation." In January 2007, former president Jordan wrote an editorial on the topic that appeared in the Washington Post. The Middle States Commission later reaffirmed Gallaudet's accreditation on June 27, 2008.

On October 18, 2009, the Board of Trustees announced that Gallaudet's tenth president would be T. Alan Hurwitz. He began his tenure on January 1, 2010. He was succeeded by Roberta Cordano in January 2016.
