= Kendall Demonstration Elementary School =

Private school in Washington, D.C., U.S.

Location
- 800 Florida Ave NE; Washington, D.C. United States 38.90874°N 76.98968°W

Information
- Type: University-affiliated laboratory school
- Established: 1857
- Founder: Amos Kendall
- Faculty: 30
- Grades: Early intervention through eighth
- Enrollment: 112
- Student to teacher ratio: 5:1
- Language: American Sign Language and English
- Colors: Yellow and blue
- Athletics conference: PVAC
- Mascot: Wildcat
- Website: www.gallaudet.edu

Kendall Demonstration Elementary School (KDES) is a private day school serving deaf and hard of hearing students from birth through grade 8 on the campus of Gallaudet University in the Trinidad neighborhood of Washington, D.C. Alongside Model Secondary School for the Deaf, it is a federally funded, tuition-free demonstration school administered by the Laurent Clerc National Deaf Education Center at Gallaudet University.

== History ==
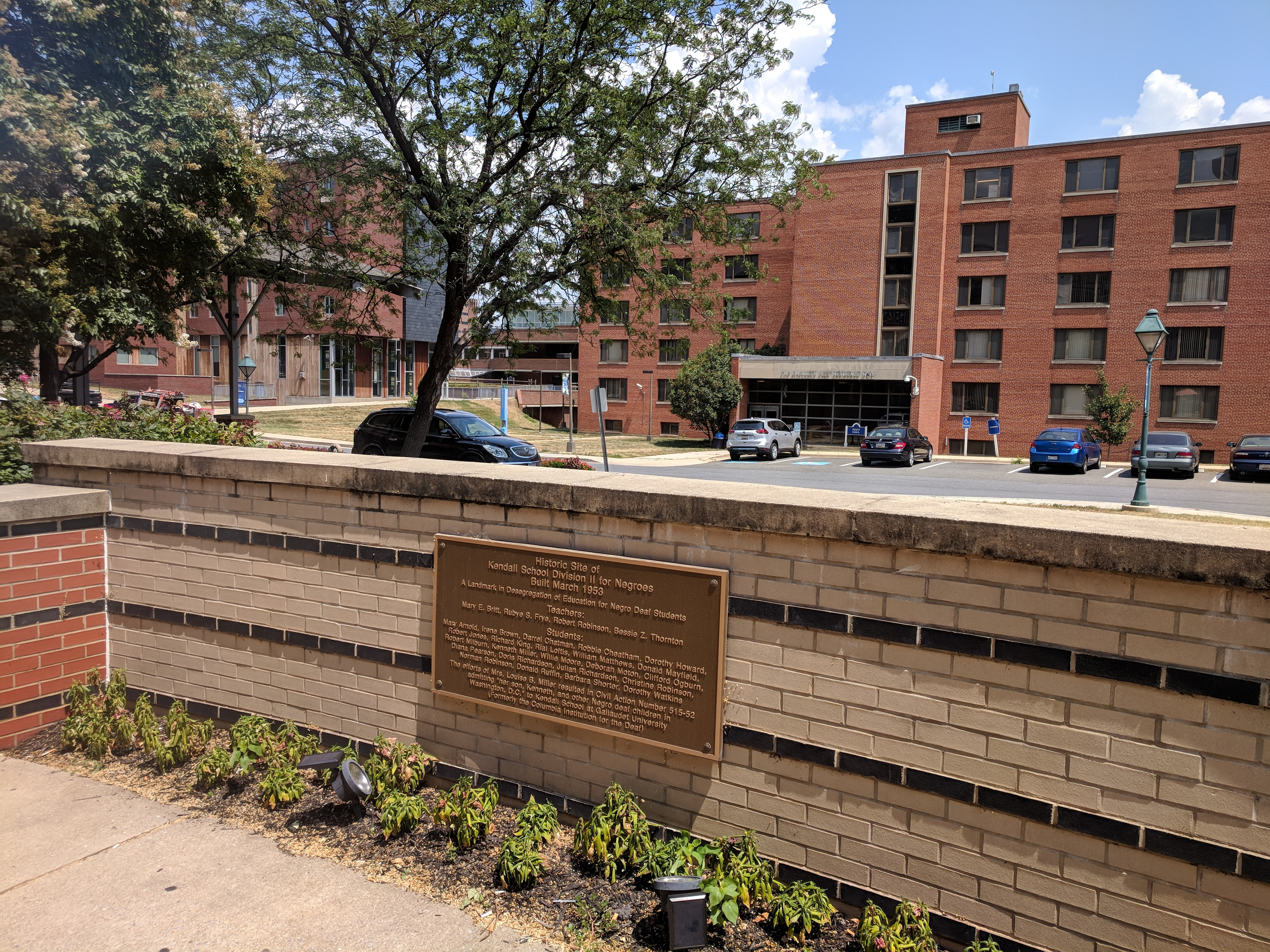
Kendall School Division II marker

KDES is named for philanthropist Amos Kendall, who in 1856 donated land and hired Edward Miner Gallaudet away from American School for the Deaf, which his father had founded, to lead a school for his wards, a group of indigent deaf and blind children. Congress chartered the school as the Columbia Institution for the Instruction of the Deaf and Dumb and the Blind in 1857, funding tuition costs for students from D.C. In 1860, Maryland began sending all its deaf students to the Columbia Institution. In the early years, the institution served students in elementary and secondary school, before beginning to offer college degrees in 1864.

In 1885, the pre-college department was separated from the undergraduate college, becoming Kendall School for the Deaf and Gallaudet College. Female students were admitted beginning in 1887. In 1901, a law was passed requiring that all deaf, school-age residents of the District of Columbia be educated at Kendall School.

Kendall was founded as a fully integrated school. At the time, that was common for schools for the deaf. However, in 1904, Kendall School's black students were moved to the Maryland School for the Colored Blind and Deaf in Baltimore at the urging of white parents and the recommendation of the National Association of the Deaf. D.C. students had to wait until they were old enough to board at school to begin their formal education.

Preschool for three- and four-year-olds was added in 1946.

After the 1952 Miller v. D.C. Board of Education ruling by the United States District Court for the District of Columbia, Kendall began again educating black students. Initially, black students were educated apart from white students in the Division II building. Two years later, Brown v. Board of Education desegregated schools and the divisions were combined.

In 1968, Kendall became the first school to use computer-assisted instruction for deaf students.

In 1970, Congress passed P.L. 89-694, which established KDES as a demonstration elementary school separate from the high school, Model Secondary School for the Deaf. In addition to serving their student bodies, the intention was to have the schools develop educational resources and strategies that would improve deaf education nationwide. This change was the result of a 1965 report to Congress about the poor state of deaf education in the United States.

During the 1970s, as a part of that effort to improve outcomes for deaf students, KDES expanded its early education to begin serving children from the onset of deafness. That included support for parents of deaf infants and toddlers who were not yet of school age, as well as a cued speech inclusion program at the National Child Research Center, a mainstream preschool in northwest D.C., that was in operation from 1973 to 1982. In 1981, a review found that of the 13 children who spent at least two years in the NCRC-Kendall program, a majority were at or above grade level.

During Deaf President Now in 1988, Gallaudet students shut down the campus. While the protestors were willing to allow KDES staff and students to enter, the administration decided to cancel classes. At a rally, KDES students expressed their support of a deaf president for Gallaudet. The Unity for Gallaudet protests in 2006 also resulted in the temporary closure of the elementary school.

In 2000, the Clerc Center created the Technology in Education Can Empower Deaf Students (TecEds) project to increase the usage of technology at its schools and therefore prepare students for technology in the workplace. As part of the project, interactive whiteboards, laptops, and projectors were brought into every classroom.

In 2023, Gallaudet granted high school diplomas to twenty-four black deaf students who, in the early 1950s, had been relegated to the segregated Kendall School Division II for Negroes and honored four teachers at the division.

Surveys of schools for the deaf over the past few decades show that the Clerc Center schools, KDES and MSSD, have long had the highest percentage of deaf staff members—46% in 1997, 58% in 2007, and 78% in 2017.

== Academics ==
KDES is accredited by the Middle States Association and the Conference of Educational Administrators of Schools and Programs for the Deaf, and is a member school of the American Society for Deaf Children. It follows the bilingual–bicultural education philosophy, meaning American Sign Language and English are both used in instruction. It is also uses the bimodal approach—rather than English being only present in its written form, students have opportunities to hear and practice oral English. The program is designed to benefit all deaf and hard-of-hearing students, including those who use amplification devices and those who do not.

The early intervention program includes classes for parents, a playgroup for caregivers with their deaf babies and toddlers, half- and full-day preschool, and pre-kindergarten. For grades K-8, the school uses Maryland Common Core standards for English and math, Clerc Center standards for ASL, and Next Generation Science Standards for science.

Graduates are automatically eligible to continue their education at Model Secondary School for the Deaf.

== Extracurriculars ==
KDES participates in several academic competitions for deaf students. In 2014, 2018, and 2019, KDES won its division in Gallaudet's Battle of the Books for elementary and middle schoolers. In 2018 and 2019, KDES was the top scoring team at the National Technical Institute for the Deaf's math competition for middle schoolers. The school holds an annual ASL spelling bee to determine who will represent the school at an ASL spelling bee against students from other schools for the deaf across the country, including Maryland School for the Deaf and California School for the Deaf, Fremont.

=== Athletics ===
In 1927, Kendall played in the first basketball tournament organized by what would become the Eastern Schools for the Deaf Athletic Association. The school continued to participate in the league through the 1960s.

Kendall was a founding member of the Mason-Dixon Schools for the Deaf Athletic Association, playing in the league's first basketball tournament in 1953. However, the Kendall team did not advance past the first round, losing 57–52 to Kentucky School for the Deaf and then 36–35 to the Alabama Institute for the Deaf and Blind in the losers' bracket, and did not participate in any later tournaments. One Kendall student, John Miller, made the 1953 All-Tournament team, as well as the all-city team that year.

Today, the KDES Wildcats compete in the Potomac Valley Athletic Conference against mainstream private schools. The school fields cross-country, volleyball, basketball, and track and field teams. They also play games and tournaments against other schools for the deaf.

== Student body ==
KDES students live with parents or guardians in the Washington, D.C., metropolitan area. Because all services are free, students are parentally placed rather than being placed in the school by their school district. The racial makeup of the K–8 student body during the 2015–16 school year was 45.5% African American, 23.4% Hispanic, 18.2% Caucasian, 7.8% Asian, and 5.2% multiracial.

Each student has an IFSP or IEP. KDES only accepts students whose primary disability is deafness, though deafblind students are accepted. A minority have cochlear implants. As of 2016, 51% have profound hearing loss and 23% have severe hearing loss.

== Notable alumni ==
- Gertrude Scott Galloway, educator
