= Harvey Corson =

American academic administrator

Harvey J. Corson, Ed.D., was the executive director for the American School for the Deaf in West Hartford, Connecticut. He announced his retirement in 2006, ending his term as executive director, a post he held at the American School for the Deaf since 2001.

Corson graduated from Gallaudet University in 1964.

During the Deaf President Now (DPN) protests in March 1988, he was one of the two deaf candidates (along with I. King Jordan) vying to become the next (and the first deaf) president of Gallaudet University (in Washington, D.C.).
