= Association of Late-Deafened Adults =

Association of Late-Deafened Adults (ALDA) is an organization for people who become deaf after childhood. ALDA was founded in 1987 by Bill Graham and Kathie Hering of Chicago, Illinois. Within a few years, the organization had chapters in over 15 regions across the United States. The primary growth vehicle was ALDA News, a monthly newsletter.

By 1989 ALDA had begun holding annual conventions, known as ALDAcons. People from throughout the world have attended these conventions, which feature workshops, an exhibit hall, and social activities. The climax of the conventions is a Saturday night party featuring karaoke. I. King Jordan, president emeritus of Gallaudet University, is one of the most famous ALDAn members and has spoken frequently at the conventions. The Association presents a yearly award in his name to a member who has shown outstanding achievement as a role model for late-deafened adults.

The former president of Gallaudet, Alan Hurwitz, is also a regular convention attendee.

Most recently, the Association of Late-Deafened Adults has been involved in Congressional hearings for technological improvements, such as movie theater captioning devices for theaters, and working with the Georgia Institute of Technology for a text conversion program for Google Glass.
