= Robert Panara =

Robert F. Panara
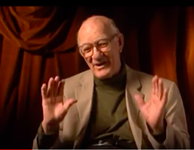
- Robert Panara in 2007
- Born: July 8, 1920
- Died: July 20, 2014 (aged 94)
- Occupations: Educator, Poet

Robert F. Panara (8 July 1920 – 20 July 2014) was a poet, a professor and a co-founder of the National Technical Institute for the Deaf (NTID) and the National Theater of the Deaf. Panara is considered to be a pioneer in deaf culture studies in the United States.

== Life ==
Panara was born in 1920 in The Bronx of New York City, and lost his hearing as a child from spinal meningitis. After high school, he attended and graduated from Gallaudet College (now Gallaudet University).

He went on to teach at Gallaudet College, before moving to the Rochester Institute of Technology where he helped found the National Technical Institute for the Deaf (NTID).

Panara was very interested in the theater and developed some of the first plays for deaf actors and audiences. He was instrumental in founding the National Theater of the Deaf in connection with the American School for the Deaf.

== Poetry ==
Panara was a poet, and his collected poems were published in 1997.

My ears are deaf, and yet I seem to hear
Sweet nature's music and the songs of man,
For I have learned from Fancy's artisan
How written words can thrill the inner ear..

— From "On His Deafness"
On His Deafness and Other Melodies Unheard (1997)

== Legacy ==
In 1987 the Rochester Institute of Technology named its performing arts theater after him, and established a scholarship fund in his name.

In 2017 the United States Postal Service issued a stamp in its Distinguished Americans series honoring Robert Panara. (Note: It is a nondenominated (forever) stamp for the 2-ounce first-class rate.)
