= Robert R. Davila =

Gallaudet University president (born 1932)

Robert Davila

9th President of Gallaudet University
- In office January 1, 2007 – December 31, 2009
- Preceded by: I. King Jordan
- Succeeded by: T. Alan Hurwitz

Personal details
- Born: July 19, 1932 (age 94)

Robert Davila (born July 19, 1932) served as the ninth president of Gallaudet University, the world's only university in which all programs and services are specifically designed to accommodate deaf and hard of hearing students. His appointment came after the wake of the Unity for Gallaudet Movement protests of 2006, when many students, staff, and alumni objected to the initial choice of Jane Fernandes as the intended next president. It was originally intended that he serve only 18–24 months as an interim president, but the Board dropped the interim designation and then extended his contract to 36 months.

== Early life ==
Robert Davila was born in southern California to Mexican-American parents who worked in fields and orchards. At age eleven, he contracted spinal meningitis and became deaf. When his mother learned about a school for the deaf in northern California, she sent him alone on a journey to the California School for the Deaf in Berkeley (which later moved to Fremont).

== Education ==
Davila graduated from Gallaudet University, with a Bachelor's in Education in 1953. He then went to Hunter College, graduating with a Master's in Special Education in 1963. To complete his education, he attended and graduated from Syracuse University with a Ph.D. in Educational Technology in 1972. He also has received honorary degrees from Gallaudet, RIT, Stonehill College, and Hunter College.

== Professional career ==
Davila served as Assistant Secretary for the Office of Special Education and Rehabilitative Services of the US Department of Education from 1989 to 1993 during the administration of George H. W. Bush. Educationally, Dr. Davila has experience teaching high school math, being an assistant principal, serving as a K-12 superintendent. He worked as professor, a college administrator and Vice President of Gallaudet University in the 1970s and '80s. He was headmaster of the New York School for the Deaf at White Plains 1993 to 1996 as well as CEO of the National Technical Institute for the Deaf 1996 from 2006. On December 10, 2006, Davila was named the ninth President of Gallaudet, enacted at the start of 2007. He stepped down as president on December 31, 2009 and was succeeded by Dr. T. Alan Hurwitz.

== Speeches and interviews ==
Davila, Robert R., Acceptance speech upon being selected President of Gallaudet University, 2006. (Download text of speech: http://saveourdeafschools.org/robert_davila_acceptance_speech_2006.pdf) Archived 2008-10-02 at the Wayback Machine.

Davila, Robert. R., Interview on KCPW, Salt Lake City, Utah, expressing support for university students' right to protest, February 2007. (Download transcript of interview: http://saveourdeafschools.org/utah.pdf) Archived 2016-03-04 at the Wayback Machine

Davila, Robert R., Installation speech as Gallaudet's Ninth President, 2007. (Download text of speech: http://saveourdeafschools.org/robert_davila_installation_speech_2007.pdf) Archived 2008-10-02 at the Wayback Machine

Davila, Robert R., Address at Gallaudet's 140th Commencement, May 15, 2009. (Download text of speech: http://saveourdeafschools.org/robert_davila_commencement_address_2009.pdf) Archived 2012-01-11 at the Wayback Machine

Davila, Robert R., Keynote Address at National Association of the Deaf convention in Denver, Colorado, 1992. (Download text of speech: http://saveourdeafschools.org/davila_keynote_NAD_denver_1992.pdf) Archived 2012-01-12 at the Wayback Machine

Davila, Robert R., Plenary Address at PEPnet 2002: Biennial Conference on Postsecondary Education for Persons who are Deaf or Hard of Hearing. (Download text of speech: http://saveourdeafschools.org/robert_davila_2002.pdf) Archived 2012-01-12 at the Wayback Machine

Davila, Robert R., Interview on Deaf Mosaic, 1989. (Link: https://ssl.gallaudet.edu/videolibrary/?embed=1695, beginning at 23:28.)

== See also ==
- Deaf Culture
- Deaf President Now (1988)

Political offices
Preceded by Madeleine Will	Assistant Secretary for Special Education and Rehabilitative Services; 1989–1993	Succeeded by Judith Heumann
Academic offices
Preceded by William E. Castle	Vice President of RIT for the National Technical Institute for the Deaf; 1996–2003	Succeeded by T. Alan Hurwitz
Preceded by I. King Jordan	President of Gallaudet University; January 1, 2007 – December 31, 2009	Succeeded by T. Alan Hurwitz
