= Roberta Cordano =

American lawyer (born 1963)

Bobbi Cordano
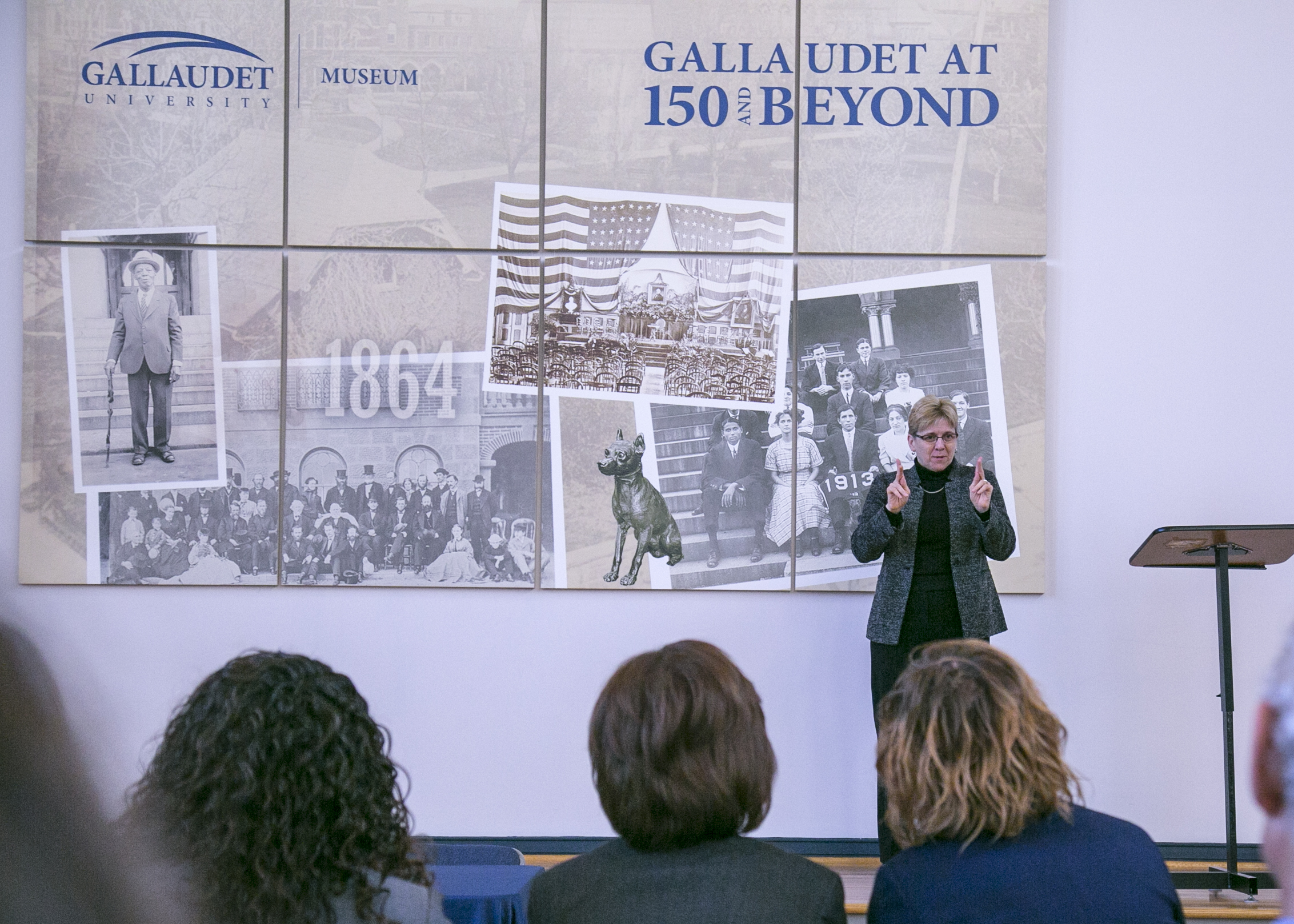
- Cordano in 2016

President of Gallaudet University
- Incumbent
- Assumed office January 1, 2016
- Preceded by: T. Alan Hurwitz

Personal details
- Born: November 29, 1963 (age 62)
- Education: Beloit College (BA); University of Wisconsin, Madison (JD)

Roberta "Bobbi" Cordano (born November 29, 1963) is the 11th president of Gallaudet University, serving since 2016. Cordano is the first deaf woman and the first LGBTQ person to become president of Gallaudet University; she is a lesbian.

Cordano obtained her Juris Doctor degree at the University of Wisconsin, Madison in 1990. She was assistant attorney general for Minnesota. She was assistant dean at the Hubert H. Humphrey Institute of Public Affairs at the University of Minnesota.

Cordano was awarded the Hubert Humphrey award by the University of Wisconsin. She is among the first ten deaf women in the United States to have earned a Juris Doctor (JD) degree and is among the first 50 deaf women to have earned a doctoral degree, overall.

Cordano is the first deaf woman to become president of Gallaudet University. Elisabeth Zinser, a hearing woman, held the Gallaudet presidency for less than one week amidst the March 1988 Deaf President Now protests. Zinser was never officially installed as president before her resignation.

Academic offices
Preceded by Alan Hurwitz	President of Gallaudet University; January 1, 2016 – present	Succeeded by Incumbent
