= Ronda Jo Miller =

American basketball and volleyball player (born 1978)

Personal information
- Nationality: American
- Born: April 21, 1978 (age 48) Little Falls, Minnesota, United States

Sport
- Country: United States
Medal record
Representing United States
Deaflympics
Women's basketball
Gold medal – first place	Copenhagen 1997	team
Women's Volleyball
Silver medal – second place	Rome 2001	team
Bronze medal – third place	Melbourne 2005	team

Ronda Jo Miller (born 21 April 1978) is a retired American professional deaf female basketball and volleyball player. She is one of the few deaf women basketball players to have tried out for WNBA. However, she did not make the team.

== Biography ==
Ronda Jo Miller was born profoundly deaf in Little Falls, Minnesota. As a child she played basketball with her brother, Robert using a hoop nailed to a shed next to their barn. She attended and graduated from the Minnesota State Academy for the Deaf. She graduated at Gallaudet University in 2001.

== Career ==
She made her Deaflympic debut at the 1997 Summer Deaflympics as part of the US deaf basketball team that claimed the gold medal. She then became the member of the US deaf volleyball team and clinched silver and bronze medals at the 2001 Summer Deaflympics and 2005 Summer Deaflympics respectively.

Apart from her Deaflympic career, she had a historic stint with Gallaudet University women's basketball team, scoring over 1000 points for Bison.

In 1997, she was nominated for the ICSD Deaf Sportswoman of the Year award for her performance in the basketball event at the 1997 Summer Deaflympics. She was inducted into the Gallaudet Athletics Hall of Fame in 2008. She retired from international basketball competitions in 2014.
