= Deaf President Now =

1988 student protest at Gallaudet University

Deaf President Now (DPN) was a student protest in March 1988 at Gallaudet University, Washington, D.C. The protest began on March 6, 1988, when the Board of Trustees announced its decision to appoint a hearing candidate, Elisabeth Zinser, over the Deaf (Note: Capitalized refers to individuals immersed in the Deaf community. Lowercased refers to people that are medically deaf.) candidates, I. King Jordan and Harvey Corson, as its seventh president.

Gallaudet students, backed by a number of alumni, staff, and faculty, shut down the campus. Protesters barricaded gates, burned effigies, and gave interviews to the press demanding four specific concessions from the Board. The protest ended on March 13, 1988, after all four demands were met including the appointment of Jordan, a deaf person, as university president. Additionally, many new laws and government recognitions were set in place due to the influence of the protest.

== Background of Gallaudet University ==
A protester displaying their demands

Gallaudet University was established in 1864 in Washington, D.C., by Thomas Hopkins Gallaudet's youngest child, Edward Miner Gallaudet. Gallaudet University was the world's first university for Deaf and hard of hearing students.

Throughout Gallaudet’s history, the Deaf community had always felt more or less unsatisfied with the Deaf representation within the faculty. Prior to 1980, there hadn't been any Deaf chief academic officer or president. A significant push for a Deaf president, however, came when Jerry C. Lee, who had been president since 1984, resigned in 1987. Opposition argued that there were no "sufficiently well-trained deaf people". In the months following Lee’s resignation, Gallaudet's Board of Trustees looked at candidates for the next president; during this time, several organizations campaigned for a Deaf president. These organizations wrote letters of endorsement to the board recommending qualified deaf candidates and reached out to the media to gain support. People such as Vice-President George H. W. Bush and Senators Bob Dole, Bob Graham, Tom Harkin, and Lowell Weicker wrote letters of endorsement for the cause. Efforts during this time were unsuccessful in garnering a powerful and unified student backing for a Deaf president.

== New presidential candidates ==
On February 28, 1988, the Board had narrowed the pool to three candidates: hearing person Elisabeth Zinser, Vice-Chancellor for Academic Affairs at the University of North Carolina at Greensboro; Irving King Jordan, Gallaudet's Dean of the College of Arts and Sciences, who was deafened at age 21 due to a motorcycle accident; and Harvey Corson, superintendent of the American School for the Deaf, who had been born deaf.

A group called the "Ducks", a radical fringe faction of the National Association of the Deaf (NAD), began organizing a rally. On March 1, 1988, the Ducks attracted more than a thousand students to Gallaudet’s football field to rally. The event garnered significantly more student support for the cause. In the following days, several small-scale protests on campus occurred. On March 6, 1988, the board selected Zinser, the sole hearing candidate, over the other two deaf applicants, Corson and Jordan, as the next president. The board, however, made no official announcement of this to the Gallaudet community; the student body found out later in the day by visiting the campus’s Public Relations Office.

== Protest ==
Upon learning of the appointment of Zinser, an angry student body led by Greg Hlibok (Student Union President), Jerry Covell, Tim Rarus and Bridgetta Bourne-Firl marched to the Mayflower Hotel, where the board members were meeting. The crowd waited outside until board member Jane Spilman came out to address the students. She responded to multiple questions surrounding the selection of Zinser as president, whereupon she allegedly said, "Deaf people cannot function in a hearing world." Upon hearing this statement, the student body met back on campus to launch a full-scale protest in retaliation.

The following morning, March 7, 1988, students barricaded the campus gates using heavy-duty bicycle locks and hot-wired buses, moving them in front of the gates and letting the air out of the tires. The locked gates forced people to use the front main entrance, where protestors allowed only select persons to enter.

The protesters had four demands:

1. Zinser would resign and the Board would select a deaf person as president.
2. Jane Bassett Spilman, chairperson of the Board of Trustees that elected Zinser, would resign.
3. The Board of Trustees would reconstitute with a 51% majority of deaf members (at the time, it was composed of 17 hearing members and 4 Deaf members).
4. There would be no reprisals against any students or staff members involved in the protest.

The Board scheduled a noon meeting with a group of students, faculty, and staff to negotiate. The Board, however, did not concede to any of the demands. The supporters of DPN then marched to the US Capitol Building. Bridgetta Bourne, Jerry Covell, Greg Hlibok, and Tim Rarus were the leading figures in the protest.

The next day, March 8, a rally was held on Gallaudet’s football field. Protesters hanged and then burned effigies of Zinser and Spilman. The group of supports continuously grew. A sixteen-member council was formed, composed of four students, three faculty, three staff, three alumni, and three members of the deaf community; at the council’s head was Hlibok.

On Wednesday, March 9, a press conference was held at the National Press Club in which board member Jane Spilman and newly elected Elizabeth Zinser made statements and addressed questions about Zinser’s attitude toward and capability to lead the Deaf community. Irving King Jordan, dean of Gallaudet’s College of Arts and Sciences and one of the three finalists for Gallaudet’s next president, publicly supported the appointment of Zinser. Later that evening, protest leader Greg Hlibok, Zinser, and deaf actress and Gallaudet alumna Marlee Matlin, were interviewed about the protest on ABC News' Nightline program.

On Thursday, March 10, Irving King Jordan came to Gallaudet to address the protesters after much backlash from his earlier support of Zinser as president and stated, "I only have anger towards the decision of the Board. We need to focus the world's attention on the larger issue. The four demands are justified." Meanwhile, in the University's interpreter/communication center, hearing protesters received phone calls from businesses, friends and anonymous donations of money, food and other supplies to aid the protest.

== Support ==
Other help outside the deaf community came from worker unions. Moe Biller, then president of the American Postal Workers Union, shared his support for the protest. In the afternoon, Zinser officially resigned.

The following morning, Friday, March 11, more than 2,500 protesters marched on Capitol Hill to celebrate. Determined to fully see their demands through, students held banners that said, "We still have a dream!"

On Sunday, March 13, 1988, Jane Spilman officially resigned and was replaced by deaf board member Phil Bravin. Bravin announced that the board had selected I. King Jordan as the next University president. Bravin also informed that no punitive action was going to be taken against those who participated in the protests. Students, faculty, and staff celebrated in Gallaudet's field house.

Throughout the week, dozens of American Sign Language/English interpreters participated in the protest. They assisted with media interviews, rallies, interactions with the police, and other demonstrations. In an interview, one of the interpreters for DPN stated, “I was trying to reflect the fact that it was the media that needed the interpreters as much as the deaf people did.”

== Resolution ==
Jordan announced his retirement in September 2005; on December 31 of 2006, he relinquished his role as president of Gallaudet University. He was later criticized when he backed Jane Fernandes' candidacy to become his successor in 2006. In October 2006, the four DPN student leaders from 1988 issued a public statement, which was harshly critical of both Jordan and Fernandes. The Deaf President Now movement led to new civil rights protections for Deaf and disabled people, including the Americans with Disabilities Act and the Telecommunications Accessibility Enhancement Act of 1988, the latter of which standardized the TTY or teletypewriter as a common communication system for American deaf individuals. The Deaf community also saw a significant increase in the number of students continuing their education after graduation.

== In the media ==
A documentary on the protest, Deaf President Now!, premiered on Apple TV+ on May 16, 2025. The film is the directorial debut of Gallaudet alum Nyle DiMarco.

== Sources ==
- Sacks, Oliver. Seeing Voices: A journey into the world of the Deaf. Harper Perennial, 1989. ISBN 0-06-097347-1.
- Shapiro, Joseph P. No Pity: People with Disabilities Forging a New Civil Rights Movement. Random House, 1993.
- Gannon, Jack R. "The Week the World Heard Gallaudet". Gallaudet University Press, 1989. ISBN 0-930323-54-8. Excerpts on Google Books
- Deaf President Now contemporaneous letters and press releases, February–March 1988.
- Halley, M. (2019). Interpreting as ideologically-structured action: Collective identity between activist interpreters and protesters. New Voices in Translation Studies, 20, 54–85.
- Brueggemann, Brenda Jo (1995). "The Coming out of Deaf Culture and American Sign Language: An Exploration into Visual Rhetoric and Literacy". Rhetoric Review. 13 (2): 409–420. ISSN 0735-0198.
- Christiansen, John B.; Barnartt, Sharon N. (1995). Deaf President Now!: The 1988 Revolution at Gallaudet University. Gallaudet University Press. doi:10.2307/j.ctv2rcngrg. ISBN 978-1-56368-035-9.
- Druchen, Bruno (2014). "The Legacy of Deaf President Now in South Africa". Sign Language Studies. 15 (1): 74–86. doi:10.1353/sls.2014.0020. ISSN 1533-6263.
- Halley, Mark (2022). "Interpreting in the Deaf President Now Protest: An Organizational Overview". Sign Language Studies. 22 (3): 399–429. ISSN 1533-6263.
- Orlans, Harold (1989). "The Revolution at Gallaudet: Students Provoke Break with Past". Change. 21 (1): 8–18. ISSN 0009-1383.
- Reynolds, Cecil; Vannest, Kimberly; Fletcher-Janzen, Elaine (2014). "Deaf President Now".
