= Alan Hurwitz =

T. Alan Hurwitz
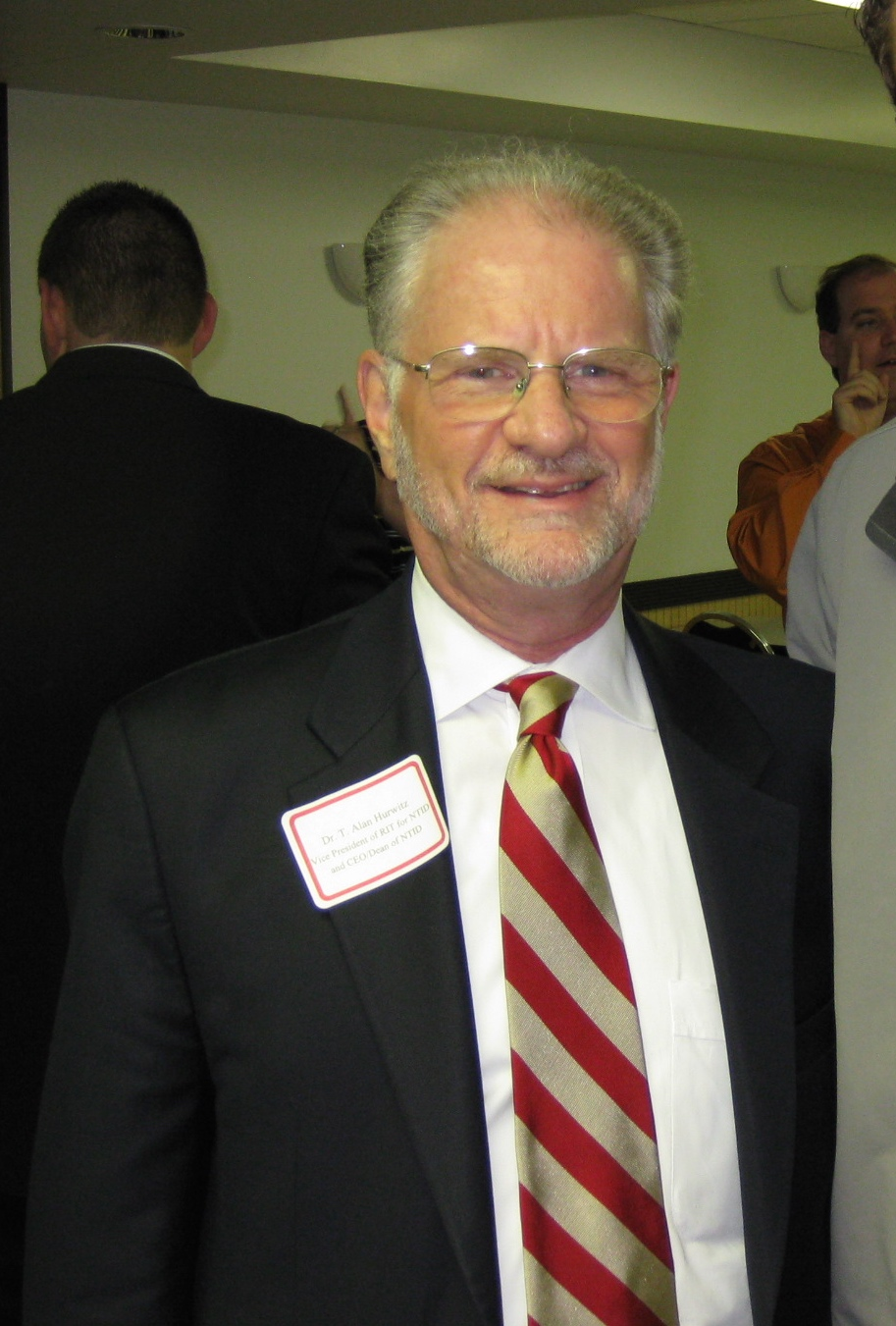

10th President of Gallaudet University
- In office January 1, 2010 – December 31, 2015
- Preceded by: Robert R. Davila
- Succeeded by: Roberta Cordano

Personal details
- Born: September 17, 1942 (age 83)

T. Alan Hurwitz (born September 17, 1942) is an American educator who served as the tenth President of Gallaudet University from 2010 to 2015. He is the first person born deaf, and first Jew, to hold this position. Previously, he served as President of the National Technical Institute for the Deaf and Vice President and Dean of Rochester Institute of Technology. He served in a variety of other roles for most of NTID's 40-year history.

Hurwitz attended the Central Institute for the Deaf.

Hurwitz started at NTID in 1970 as an educational specialist in RIT's College of Engineering after working for McDonnell Douglas Corp. since 1965. He subsequently held a number of progressively more responsible positions, including Support Department Chair for Engineering and Computer Science Programs, Director for NTID Support Services, Associate Dean for Educational Support Services Programs, Associate Vice President for NTID Outreach and External Affairs, and Associate Dean for Student Affairs.

Hurwitz has been active in a variety of professional and deafness-related organizations and serves on a number of boards of organizations serving deaf persons, including the Rochester School for the Deaf and the National Captioning Institute. He is a former president of the National Association of the Deaf (NAD), and has traveled and lectured extensively nationally and internationally.

He earned a B.S. in electrical engineering from Washington University in St. Louis, an M.S. in electrical engineering from Saint Louis University, and an Ed.D. in curriculum and teaching from the University of Rochester.

On October 18, 2009, Hurwitz was selected as the 10th president of Gallaudet University. He took office on January 1, 2010.

Hurwitz retired on December 31, 2015, with Roberta Cordano succeeding him as the eleventh president of Gallaudet University.

Hurwitz was born profoundly deaf, to deaf parents.

Cultural offices
Preceded by Gertrude S. Galloway	President of the National Association of the Deaf; 1982–1984	Succeeded by Lawrence H. Forestal
Academic offices
Preceded by James J. DeCaro	Dean of the National Technical Institute for the Deaf; 1998 – December 31, 2009	Succeeded by James J. DeCaro
Preceded by Robert R. Davila	Vice President of RIT for the National Technical Institute for the Deaf; 2003 – December 31, 2009	Succeeded by James J. DeCaro
Preceded by Robert R. Davila	President of Gallaudet University; January 1, 2010 – December 31, 2015	Succeeded by Roberta Cordano
