= Jane Fernandes =

American educator

Jane K. Fernandes
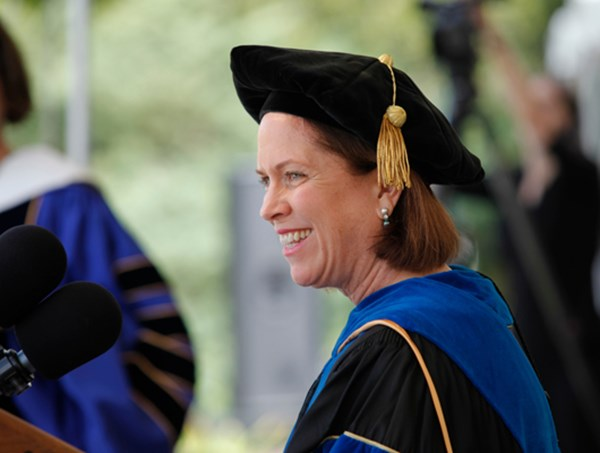

President of Antioch College
- In office August 16, 2021 – September 10, 2026
- Succeeded by: Natalie Kubat (Interim)

Personal details
- Born: Jane Frances Kelleher; August 21, 1956 (age 70) Worcester, Massachusetts, U.S.
- Spouse: James John Fernandes (m. 1988)
- Education: Trinity College, Connecticut (BA); University of Iowa (MA, PhD)

Jane Fernandes (born August 21, 1956) is an American educator and social justice advocate. Between August 2021 and September 2026, Fernandes was the President of Antioch College in Yellow Springs, Ohio. She previously served as president of Guilford College from 2014 to 2021.

In 1990, Fernandes became the first deaf woman to lead an American school designed for deaf, hard of hearing, blind, and deaf-blind students, serving at the Hawaii School for the Deaf and Blind in Honolulu until August 1995.

== Early life and education ==
Jane Frances Kelleher was born on August 21, 1956, in Worcester, Massachusetts. She is the oldest child of Richard Paul and Mary Kathleen (née Cosgrove) Kelleher. Her father was a lawyer and judge serving in Worcester, Barnstable, and Falmouth. Her mother was deaf and raised to speak, read, and write English; she was also a trained golfer, following in her parents' footsteps. Jane, who was born deaf, was raised in the same way. She attended Worcester public schools before any state or federal laws required accommodations for deafness. She received intensive hearing and speech instruction through a partnership between home and school. While attending graduate school, she learned American Sign Language (ASL) and became involved with the Deaf community.

She attended Trinity College, earning a B.A. degree in French and comparative literature. She attended the Middlebury College language school in French over two summers and studied in Cassis, France. At Trinity, in 1977 and 1978, she received the John Curtis Underwood Memorial Poetry Prize and the comparative literature book prize for her senior thesis. At The University of Iowa, she earned her M.A. and Ph.D., in comparative literature with emphasis on French poetry in historical depth, Renaissance and Baroque drama and American Sign Language literature. She also received the Phillip G. Hubbard Human Rights Award.

== Career ==
After graduating from Iowa, she carried out academic work centered in Deaf Language and Culture. She coordinated the American Sign Language and Interpreting Programs at Northeastern University before going to Gallaudet University as chair of Sign Communication. During this time, The Education of the Deaf Act of 1986 came into law.

=== Hawaii ===
She married James Fernandes in 1988. In 1990 they moved to Honolulu, Hawaii where she became the first Deaf woman to lead an American school designed for deaf, hard of hearing, blind, and deaf-blind students, serving at the Hawaii School for the Deaf and the Blind in Honolulu until August 1995. She also established an Interpreter Education Program at Kapiʻolani Community College and taught Deaf Education at the University of Hawaii, Manoa. During her time there she fostered the understanding of Hawaiian Sign Language as the Sign Language of Indigenous Peoples on the islands.

In 1993, she received the Alice Cogswell Award in 1993 from Gallaudet University for valuable service on behalf of deaf citizens.

=== Gallaudet University ===
Upon resuming service to Gallaudet University in 1995, Fernandes served as Vice President of the National Deaf Education Center. She led several projects to improve deaf education nationwide, in three areas;

- Literacy for all deaf children;
- The transition from high school to postsecondary education, work, careers;
- Family involvement in a deaf child's life.

In 1999, she proposed the creation of the Cochlear Implant Education Center at Kendall Demonstration Elementary School which was established in 2000. Through this program, she stated publicly that American Sign Language and cochlear implant technology are both important to the development of deaf infants, toddlers, and youth.

In 2000, President I. King Jordan named Fernandes provost of the university without consulting the faculty, a move which Jordan called "a terrible mistake". During this time the university raised $28 million for the Sorenson Language and Communication Center, created the World Deaf Leadership scholarship and obtained research grants from the government and the National Science Foundation Science of Learning grant.

Her main work was on the university’s strategic plan "New Directions for Academic Affairs" which called for Gallaudet University to model what it means to be an inclusive deaf university in all aspects of life; this included students living with deaf or hearing parents, using different languages, having a deaf member of their family, as well as other social differences, such as social, gender or ethnic status.

=== Presidency of Gallaudet ===
When Jordan retired, Fernandes applied for the university presidency. In the application, Fernandes wrote:

Gallaudet's mission holds both personal and professional meaning for me. I am a white Deaf woman, the daughter of a Deaf mother and a hearing father, with both Deaf and hearing brothers, all of whom are white people. The generations of white Deaf and hearing people in my family have never signed; they have always been oral people. Having grown up Deaf, I came to learn Sign Language relatively late, at the age of 23, while I was a graduate student at the University of Iowa. From that time on, I have embraced signing and visual communication as the keystone of Deaf education and now the uniting feature of Gallaudet's diverse, Deaf community. While we respect a variety of communication modes and languages among Deaf people, we must also unite in affirming visucentric public discourse.

Her presidential platform, "Many Ways of Being Deaf," articulated work to be done throughout the university to include, value, and respect students, faculty, and staff of all races and all ways of being deaf, hard of hearing, and deaf-blind. Naming racism and audism as systemic issues at Gallaudet caused a strong reaction to Fernandes' appointment as Gallaudet University president. Audism, defined by Tom Humphries, is discrimination based on the ability to hear or behave in the manner of one who hears. Scores of students protested against her appointment. According to The Washington Post, "Students objected to the appointment of Jane Fernandes, who is Deaf and is currently the university's provost because she did not grow up using American Sign Language. Some students also criticized Fernandes for not having warm relations with students." Protestors objected to Fernandes because she was "not Deaf enough." One flier handed out in the protest attacked her because "her mother and brother are deaf, but use spoken language." When this did not resonate with the public, the protestors clarified that they believed she lacked the charisma to represent deaf people to the world.

Protestors perceived that Fernandes, having learned ASL as an adult, was insufficiently committed to addressing the problem of audism. The student paper took polls a few days before the selection. Of those faculty members who responded, 36% gave Fernandes an "acceptable" rating, compared to 53% and 64% for two other finalists.

On October 29, 2006, six months after the Board selected her as president, but before she had assumed the position, the Board of Trustees of Gallaudet University rescinded her contract to be the ninth President of Gallaudet.

Fernandes went on to serve as a Senior Fellow at the Johnnetta B. Cole Global Diversity and Inclusion Institute.

=== University of North Carolina at Asheville ===
In 2008, Fernandes was selected as Provost and Vice Chancellor for Academic Affairs at the University of North Carolina at Asheville. During her time there Asheville hosted the University of North Carolina Eshelman School of Pharmacy on its campus. She was widely applauded for her successful efforts to increase diversity, equity and inclusion throughout the university's operations.

=== President of Guilford College (2014–2021) ===
In 2014, she became the first Deaf woman to lead an American college or university, serving at Guilford College through July 2021. She succeeded Kent Chabotar becoming the first woman to hold this position.

In partnership with the Guilford College campus community, Fernandes launched the Guilford Edge, innovative and shared student experiences, consisting of learning collaboratively, integrating advising, leading ethically, and rallying campus spirit. The establishment of a Cabinet-level Vice President of Diversity, Equity, and Inclusion resulted in diversity being central to every College decision. President Fernandes supported gender equity in athletic participation, practice, and experience necessary for the student body.

While at Guilford, Fernandes became a founding member of the Presidents' Alliance on Higher Education and Immigration. Formed in 2017, it is dedicated to increasing public awareness of how immigration policies and practices impact students, college campuses, and communities. Fernandes advocated on behalf of Guilford College's DACA students and alumni for a bipartisan Congressionally approved path to citizenship. On July 31, 2020, Guilford College achieved victory in a federal lawsuit on behalf of international students at Guilford College and throughout the nation.

Fernandes announced that she would leave the presidency on June 30, 2021. The Guilford Board awarded her a one-year sabbatical and transition to a tenured faculty position in English.

=== President of Antioch College (2021-2026) ===
In August 2021 Antioch College announced the selection of Fernandes as their president. She continued to work in the area of diversity.

In May 2023 she was ranked as being one of the top 200 most influential academics in the US.

Fernandes retired effective September 10, 2026, with her duties at Antioch assumed by Acting Interim President Natalie Kubat and the core leadership team while a search was conducted for a new President.

== Personal life ==
She married Professor James Fernandes in 1988. They have two children.

She has published several articles and poems on issues including Deaf culture, education, language and social justice.

She is a convinced Quaker.
