= National Technical Institute for the Deaf =

Technological college in New York, U.S.

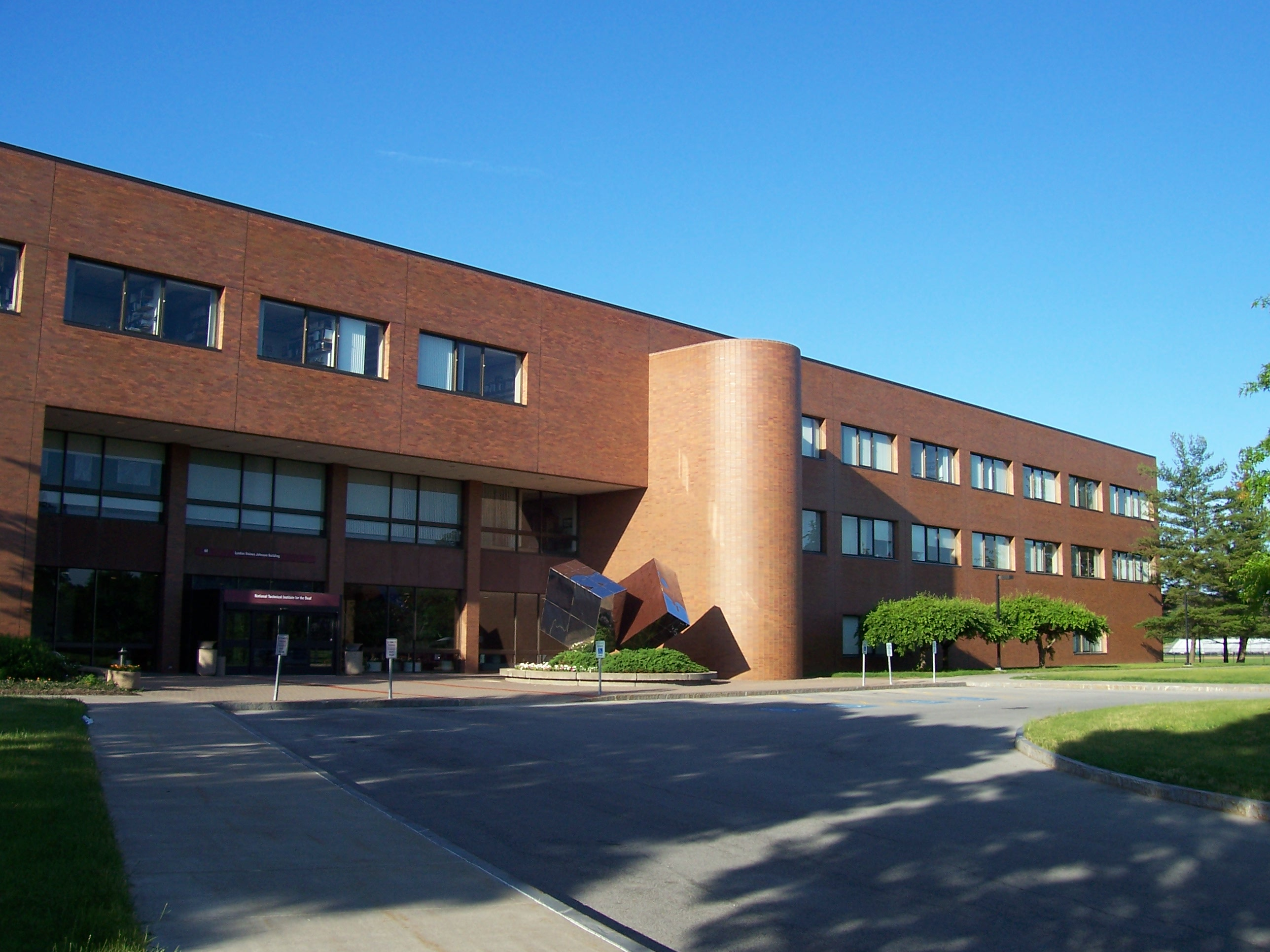
- Type: Private-Public partnership
- Established: 1965
- President: Caroline M. Solomon
- Location: Henrietta, New York; 43.0871°N 77.6683°W
- Website: rit.edu/ntid

The National Technical Institute for the Deaf (NTID) is the first and largest technological college in the world for students who are deaf or hard of hearing. As one of nine colleges within the Rochester Institute of Technology (RIT) in Rochester, New York, NTID provides academic programs, access, ASL in-class interpreters and support services—including on-site audiological, speech-language, and cochlear implant support. As of fall quarter 2012, NTID encompasses just under 10% of RIT's enrollment, 1259 students. Roughly 775 deaf and hard of hearing students are cross-registered into another RIT college's program with support from NTID.

In addition to a master's degree in deaf education, NTID also offers a bachelor's degree program in ASL-English Interpretation.

== History ==
The institute was established in 1965 by the passage of Pub. L. 89–36. The law also established a National Advisory Group to find a suitable site for the school. The Advisory Group considered proposals from Illinois State University, Pennsylvania State University, the University of Southern California, the State University of New York, the University of Colorado at Boulder and others before deciding on RIT as its home in 1966. Three factors helped RIT secure the responsibility for the new institute:

- RIT had just moved to a new campus, so the institute would not find itself in second-hand quarters.
- Rochester businessmen had enlightened views about disability in the workplace and were eager to share those views with the Advisory Group.
- RIT had a trustee, Edmund Lyon, who had served as president of the Alexander Graham Bell Association for the Deaf and Hard of Hearing and as trustee of the Rochester School for the Deaf.

The institute was originally conceived as tuition-free, providing technical training as well as academic and communication skills training to 600 deaf students annually.

NTID admitted its first students in 1968. Its establishment initially caused a great deal of friction on campus between hearing students and deaf students and RIT faculty and NTID faculty, the points of contention centering on the construction of new buildings for NTID, whether or not NTID faculty salaries were more generous than those of their peers, and communication differences between American Sign Language and American English.

In the early 1980s, NTID's enrollment spiked as deaf students from the "rubella bulge" of the mid-1960s entered their college years. Enrollment has been trending higher again in recent years; NTID's 2008 enrollment was its highest ever at 1,450, easily surpassing the previous record of 1,358 set in 1984.

In 1993, NTID established its Center for Arts and Sciences to help boost the numbers of undecided (or underprepared) students who stay on to pursue a baccalaureate degree. By 2005, this program had raised the proportion of NTID students in bachelor's degree programs to 41% (from 12% twenty years earlier).

The history of NTID and the art, culture, technology, and language of the Deaf community are preserved in the RIT/NTID Deaf Studies Archive, which is housed on campus in the RIT Archive Collections in Wallace Library.

Institute leaders
Name	Title	Tenure
D. Robert Frisina	Director; Senior Vice President	1967–1968; 1977–1979
William E. Castle	Director; Vice President	1968–1982; 1979–1994
Peter Pere	Dean	1982–1984
James J. DeCaro	Dean Interim president	1984–1998 1995-1996
Robert R. Davila	Vice President	1996–2006
T. Alan Hurwitz	Dean; President	1998 – December 31, 2009; 2006 – December 31, 2009
James J. DeCaro	Interim president	January 1, 2010 – December 31, 2010
Gerard J. Buckley	President	January 1, 2011 – July 18, 2025
Caroline M. Solomon	President	July 19, 2025 – present

== Notable alumni ==
- Clayton Valli
- Daniel Durant

== See also ==
- PEN-International (Postsecondary Education Network International)
- Project Insight
- Gallaudet University
