= Gallaudet University =

Private university in Washington, D.C. for the Deaf and hard-of-hearing

- Former names: National College for the Deaf and Dumb (1864–1865); National Deaf-Mute College (1865–1894); Gallaudet College (1894–1986)
- Motto: אתפתח/Ephphatha (Aramaic)
- Motto in English: "Be opened"
- Type: Private federally chartered university
- Established: April 8, 1864; 162 years ago
- Accreditation: MSCHE
- Academic affiliations: CUWMA
- Endowment: $228.9 million (2024)
- President: Roberta Cordano
- Academic staff: 553
- Administrative staff: 32
- Students: 1,354 (Fall 2024)
- Undergraduates: 875 (Fall 2024)
- Postgraduates: 460 (Fall 2024)
- Other students: 19 (Fall 2024)
- Location: Washington, D.C., United States; 38.907222°N 76.993056°W
- Campus: Large city, 99 acres (0.40 km^{2})
- Newspaper: The Buff and Blue
- Colors: Buff; Blue
- Nickname: Bison
- Sporting affiliations: NCAA Division III - United East; ECFC
- Mascot: Gally the Bison
- Website: gallaudet.edu

Gallaudet University (Note: "Columbia Institution for the Deaf" was the corporate name from 1911 for what is now Gallaudet University. In 1954 a law was passed, changing the corporate name to "Gallaudet College." (The collegiate department of the Columbia Institution had gone by the name "Gallaudet College" since 1894.) In 1986, another law was passed changing the name to "Gallaudet University.") (/ˌɡæləˈdɛt/ GAL-ə-DET) is a private federally chartered university in Washington, D.C., for the education of the deaf and hard of hearing. It was founded in 1864 as a grammar school for both deaf and blind children. It was the first school for the advanced education of the deaf and hard of hearing in the world and remains the only higher education institution in which all programs and services are specifically designed to accommodate deaf and hard of hearing students. Hearing students are admitted to the graduate school and a small number are also admitted as undergraduates each year. The university was named after Thomas Hopkins Gallaudet, a notable figure in the advancement of deaf education.

Gallaudet University is officially bilingual, with American Sign Language (ASL) and written English used for instruction and by the college community. Although there are no specific ASL proficiency requirements for undergraduate admission, many graduate programs require varying degrees of knowledge of the language as a prerequisite. It is classified among "Research Colleges and Universities".

To ensure that the university's leadership team can understand the student population needs, the staff is predominantly deaf. In 2025, the President, the chief of staff and the chief academic, bilingual, communications and undergraduate admissions, financial, legal, and operating officers, the dean of student affairs and the Clerc Center chief academic officer are deaf. In line with the same goal of student representativeness, the majority of executive-level appointees are women.

== History ==
=== Early history (1856–1900) ===
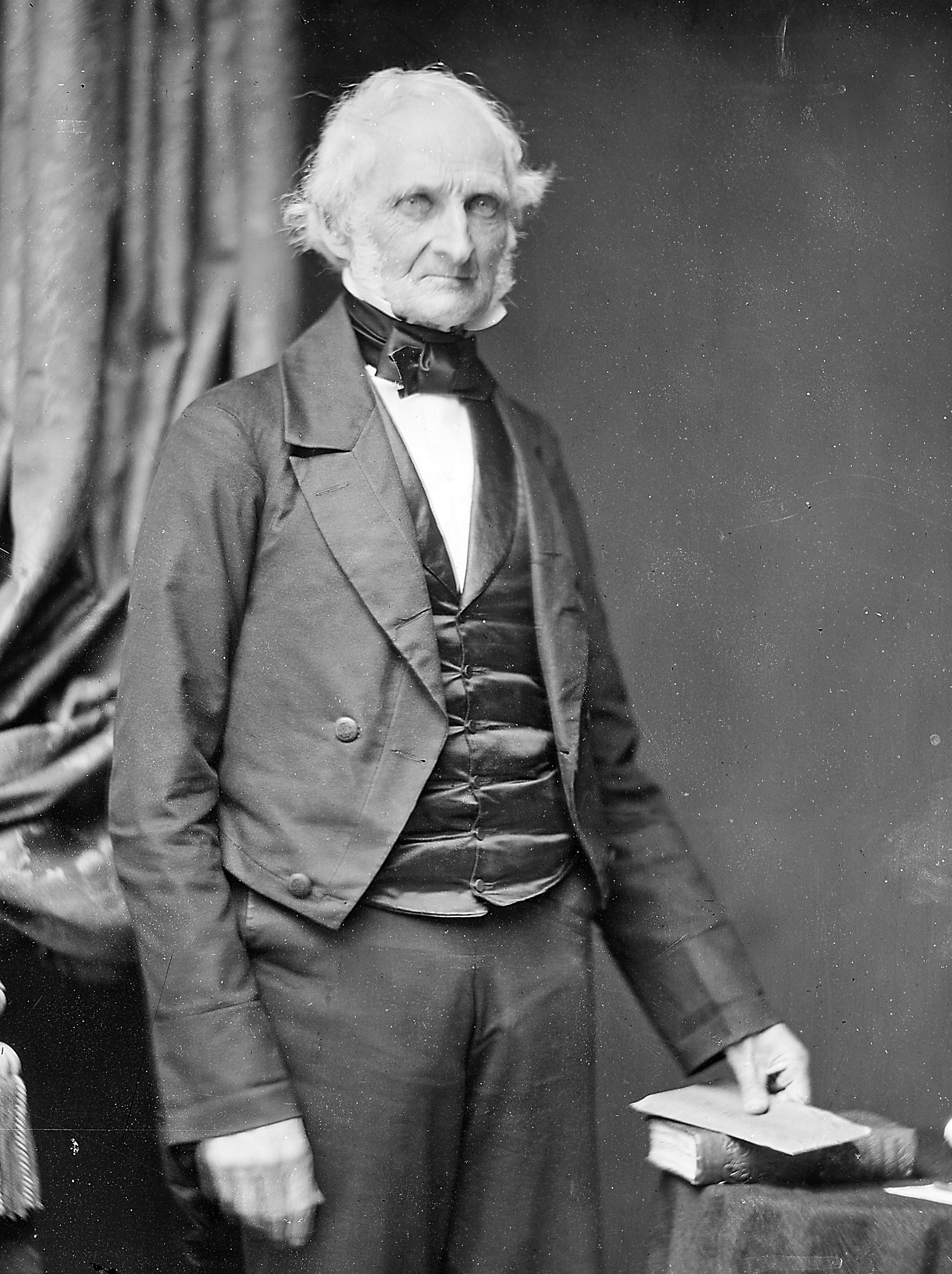
Amos Kendall by Mathew Brady

In 1856, philanthropist and former United States postmaster general Amos Kendall became aware of several deaf and blind children in Washington, D.C., who were not receiving proper care. Kendall had the courts declare the children to be his wards and donated 2 acres (0.81 ha) of his land to establish housing and a school for them. The school was established in 1857 with considerable efforts being made by several concerned citizens, including Edward Miner Gallaudet, of Washington, D.C. Two houses were used at the school's inception, one purchased and one rented.

In 1857, the 34th Congress passed H.R. 806, which chartered the grammar school as the "Columbia Institution for the Instruction of the Deaf and Dumb and the Blind" and funded tuition costs for indigent deaf, dumb (mute), or blind children belonging to the District of Columbia. Edward Miner Gallaudet was the first superintendent of the new school.

On November 1, 1858, the First Annual Report was submitted to the Secretary of the Interior.

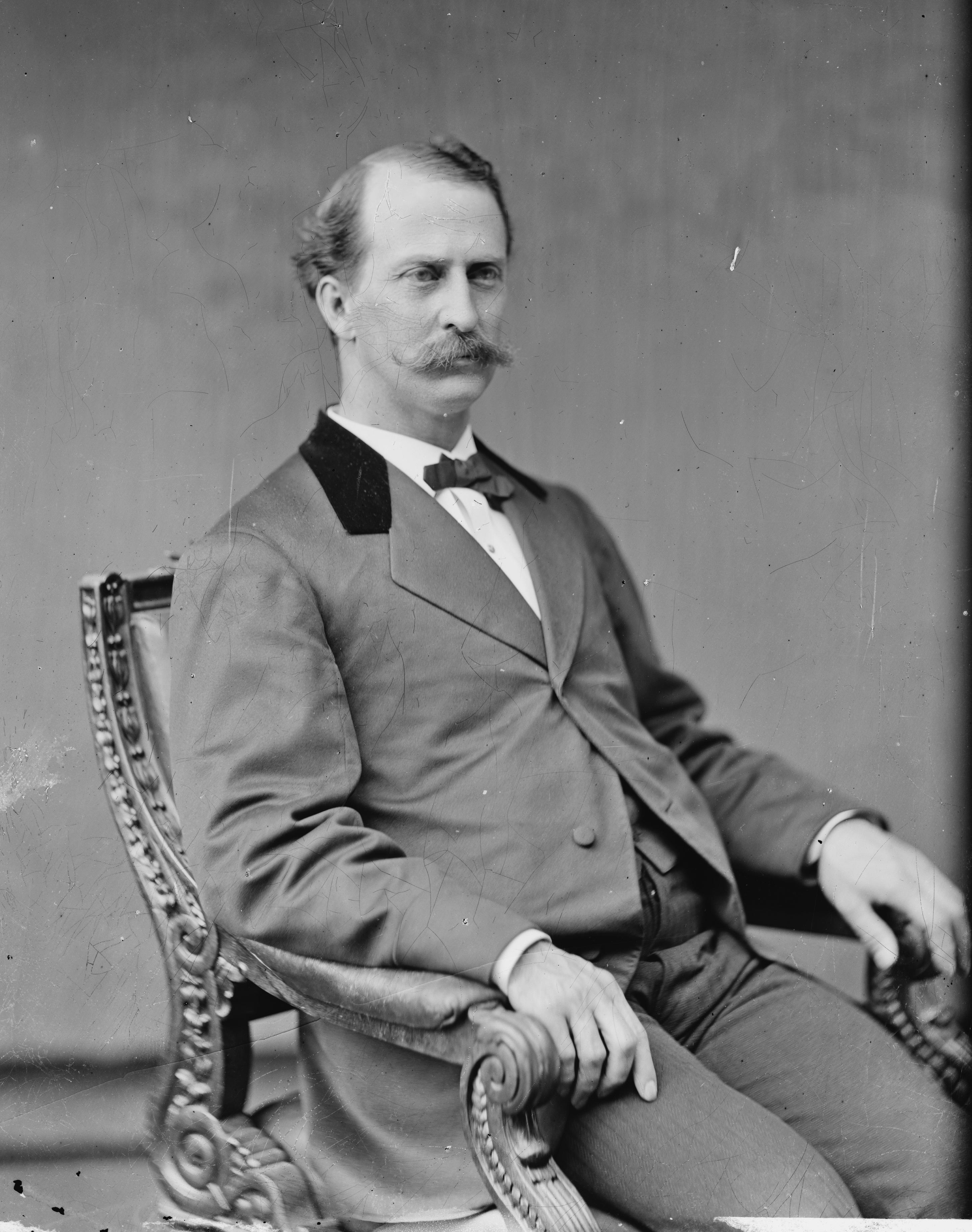
Edward Miner Gallaudet

During the school's second full year of operation (1858–1859), 14 deaf students and 7 blind students were in attendance. Superintendent Gallaudet, anticipating the future growth of the school, requested money for more buildings, lamenting the fact that the money was not issued in the year prior, due to federal budget problems. The Second Annual Report was submitted November 5, 1859.

During the third academic year (1859–1860), Kendall beseeched the federal government for funds to relocate the school to more spacious grounds. Gallaudet praised Kendall for donating money needed to construct a new brick building; both existing school buildings were already at capacity. There were 24 deaf students, necessitating a second teacher of the deaf. The teacher of the 6 blind students resigned due to health concerns.

By the start of the 1860–1861 academic year, the Civil War had been in progress for over six months. Gallaudet reported that the students were safe and free from fear. There were 35 deaf students and 6 blind students in attendance during the academic year. An art teacher was hired for the first time.

During 1861–1862, new monies provided for industrial education were used to rent a nearby shop in order to teach cabinet-making to the male students. Plans were underway to construct a new building using $9,000 that Congress appropriated to the school. There were 35 deaf students and 6 blind students. During vacation in August a regiment of Union troops used the brick building for a hospital, and some of the students who stayed over the summer helped with tending to the sick soldiers. One soldier died. For the first time, Gallaudet proposed expanding the school to create a college for deaf students.

Even with new construction completed for the 1862–1863 school year, the school was still at capacity and more money was needed to purchase 13 acres (5.3 ha) of adjoining land and then build still more buildings. Gallaudet asked for money to pipe in water from the Anacostia River, as the existing cistern and well were inadequate for the school's burgeoning needs.

Old Fowler Hall, c. 1866

College-level courses were offered for the first time during the 1863–64 academic year. In early 1864, the 38th Congress authorized the institution to grant and confirm college degrees and an enabling act was signed by President Lincoln on April 8. Today, April 8 is celebrated at Gallaudet as Charter Day in commemoration of the official beginning of Gallaudet University. The collegiate department became known as the "National College for the Deaf and Dumb" from 1864 to 1865 and then would be known as the "National Deaf-Mute College" until 1894. In recognition of his hard work in helping the institution grow during its formative years, Gallaudet was also promoted from superintendent to president. An elaborate inauguration ceremony of Gallaudet as president was held in June with Laurent Clerc in attendance. 14 acres (5.7 ha) of land was purchased with money supplied by the government. He continued to push for funds for expansion and new buildings.

Presidents of Gallaudet University
#	Name	Tenure
1	Edward Miner Gallaudet	1864–1910
2	Percival Hall	1910–1945
3	Leonard M. Elstad	1945–1969
4	Edward C. Merrill Jr.	1969–1983
5	W. Lloyd Johns	October 1983–January 1984
6	Jerry C. Lee	1984–1988
7	Elisabeth A. Zinser	March 1988
8	I. King Jordan Jr.	1988–2006
9	Robert Davila	2006–2009
10	T. Alan Hurwitz	2010–2015
11	Roberta Cordano	2016–present

The enrollment numbers increased rapidly during the 1864–1865 academic year. That same year, in early 1865, the 38th Congress removed the provision that the institution was to educate the blind, and renamed it the "Columbia Institution for the Instruction of the Deaf and Dumb". (This would be the corporate name for the entire institution, including the collegiate division, until 1911, when the legal name was changed to the "Columbia Institution for the Deaf".) Gallaudet asked the government for money to accomplish several projects, including the construction of an ice house and a gas house, sewer lines, and more. Major construction from earlier projects continued on campus. Following Gallaudet's proposal a year earlier to discontinue services for the small number of blind students the institution had at the time, explaining that the blind students would be better served at a specialized facility, the blind students were henceforth transferred to the school for the blind in Baltimore, Maryland.

During the 1865–1866 academic year, Gallaudet responded to criticism from supporters of the oral method in Massachusetts, saying that oral instruction is usually of little value to congenitally deaf children. Gallaudet proposed that a representative of the school be sent to Europe to study the methods employed there, in order to determine which types of instructional methods might be added to those methods already being used successfully at the Columbia Institution and other American schools. Combined enrollment of all levels of instruction, including the collegiate level, exceeded 100 for the first time during this year. There were 25 students enrolled in the college, including students from 14 states. Edward Allen Fay joined the faculty as a professor of history, having learned to sign as a child.

In the 1866–1867 academic year, the building for the primary school was extended and sickness was thereby reduced. A mathematics professor was hired for the first time. More money was needed to accommodate additional students expected to swell the ranks of the school.

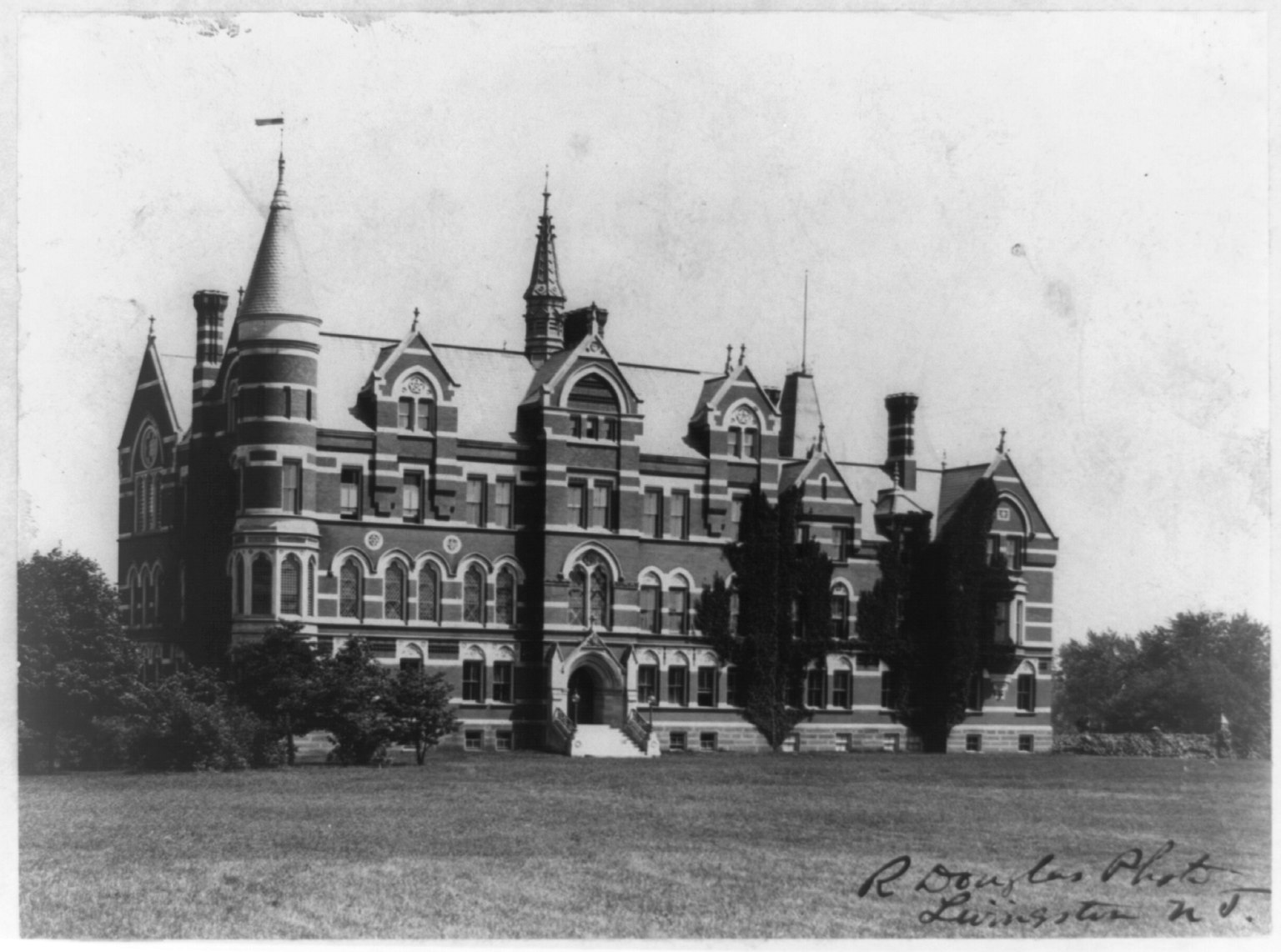
Gallaudet College in 1897

Gallaudet gave a lengthy account of his travels to Europe in 1867 and was very critical of the extent to which speech is taught to deaf children in European schools for the deaf. Nevertheless, he recommended that a limited amount of speech training be afforded to deaf students in America to those who show they can benefit. The locations he visited included: Dublin, Ireland; Geneva, Switzerland; Vienna, Austria; Paris, France; Prague, Bohemia; (Prague, Czech Republic); Berlin, Prussia (Berlin, Germany); London, England; Edinburgh, Scotland; Saint Petersburg, Russia; Stockholm, Sweden; Copenhagen, Denmark; and many other cities in Europe.

The biggest educational conference in the then-history of deaf education was held during the month of May 1868 in Washington, D.C., largely made up of principals of schools for the deaf. Fourteen of the twenty-two schools for the deaf were represented. The chief topic of discussion was the recommendations put forth by Edward Gallaudet regarding adding articulation lessons to schools' curricula.

In 1868–1869, the first students completed a full course of college studies, all three men graduating with bachelor's degrees in June.

The founder of the school, Amos Kendall, died in November 1869. Gallaudet delivered a eulogy at the board meeting in January 1870. The main central building, now called Chapel Hall, was partially completed, with rooms in the basement and on the first floor first being used. Plans were being made to purchase Amos Kendall's estate, which adjoined the grounds of the school. Gallaudet cautioned Congress that Kendall's heirs had plans to subdivide the property if it was not sold to the Columbia Institution, and hence the land would never again become available for purchase as a whole.

In the 1871–1872 academic year, the diplomas of the graduates that summer were signed by President U.S. Grant, beginning a tradition of all Gallaudet graduates having their diplomas signed by the then-serving US president.

In 1881, Laura Sheridan, a hearing woman, inquired about the school accepting women. She was told that deaf women could not enter the institution at the time. In 1887 Gallaudet agreed to allow women to matriculate for the 1887-1888 and 1888–1889 academic years with the understanding that it would be considered an experiment. Temporary living arrangements were made for the 11 students who initially entered. Five female students remained when the school announced in 1889 that the college would be permanently coeducational, with two graduating. One of the students was Agatha Tiegel in the class of 1893, who later married the well-known deaf architect Olof Hanson.

In 1894, the collegiate division was officially renamed "Gallaudet College" from the "National Deaf-Mute College" in honor of Thomas Hopkins Gallaudet, President Gallaudet's father.

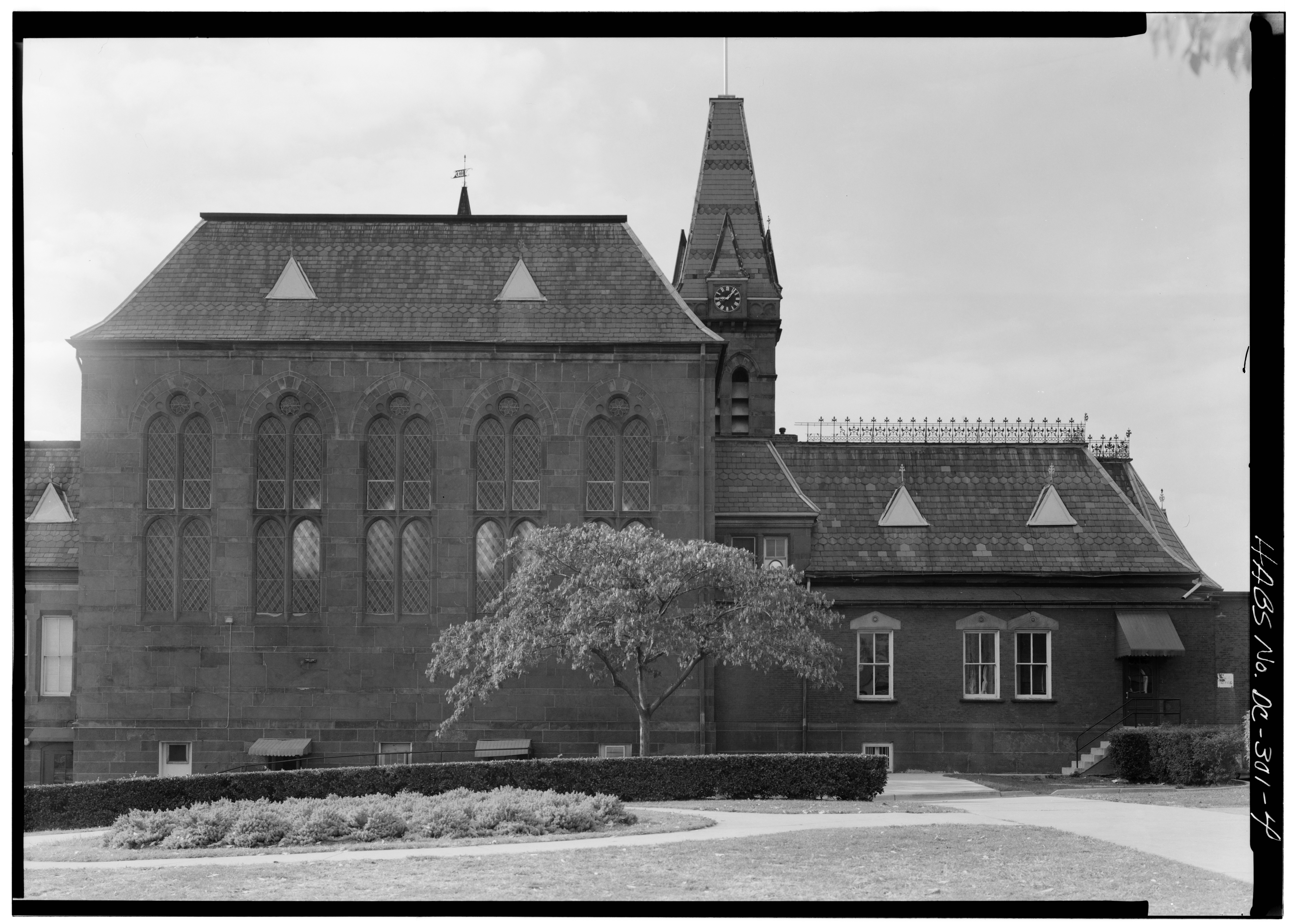
Exterior view of the Chapel

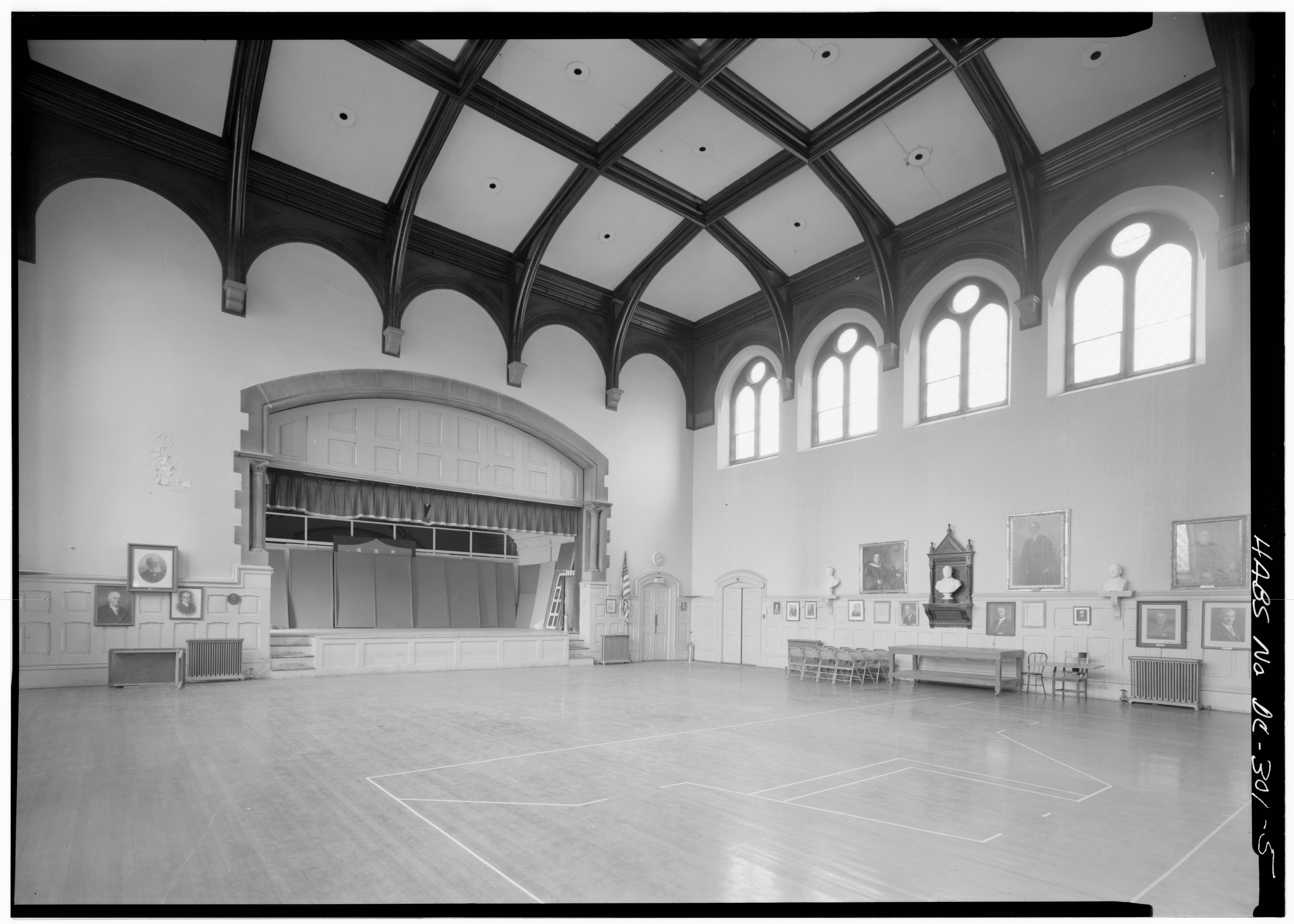
Inside the chapel, view toward the Choir

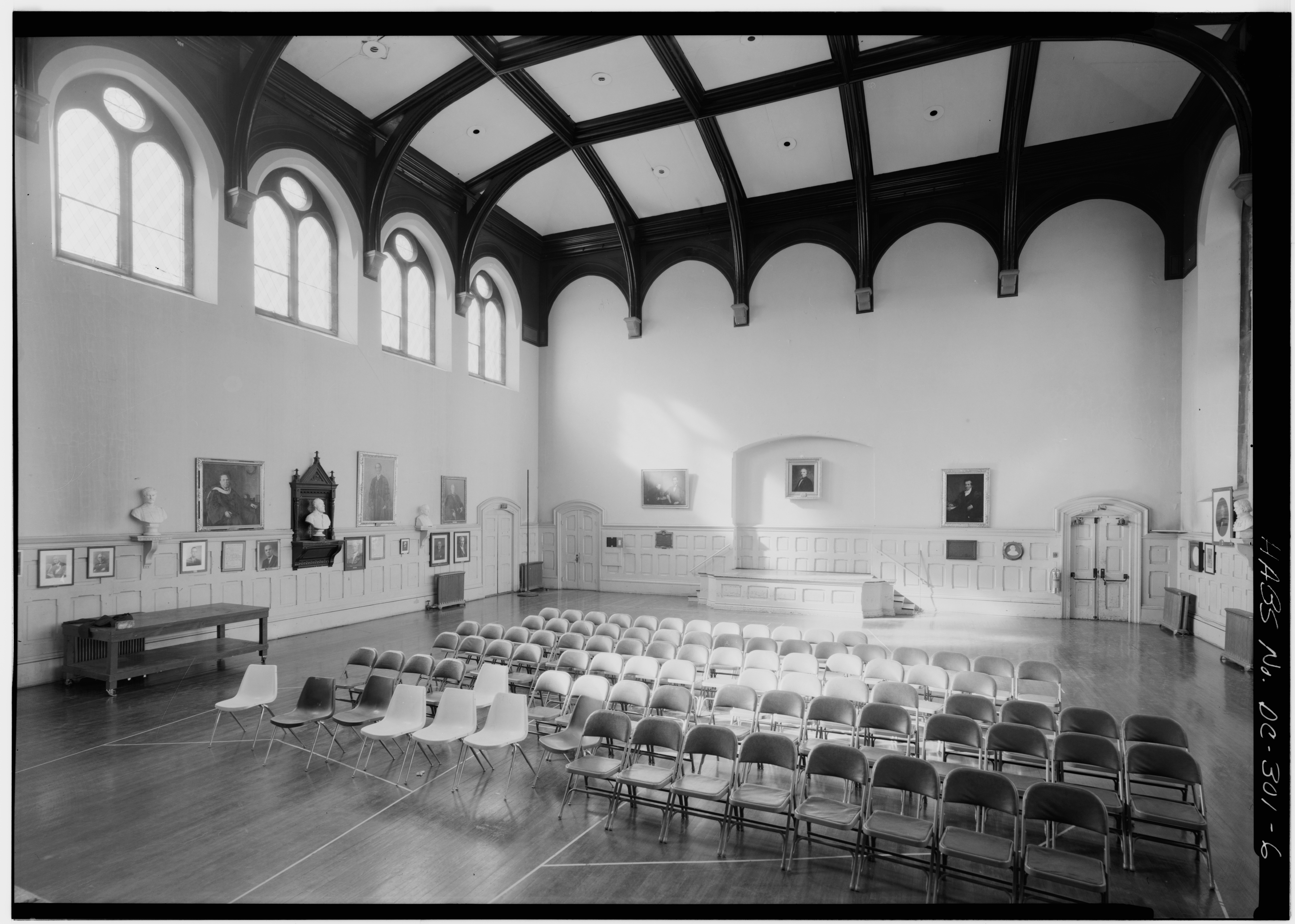
Inside the chapel, view toward the Pulpit

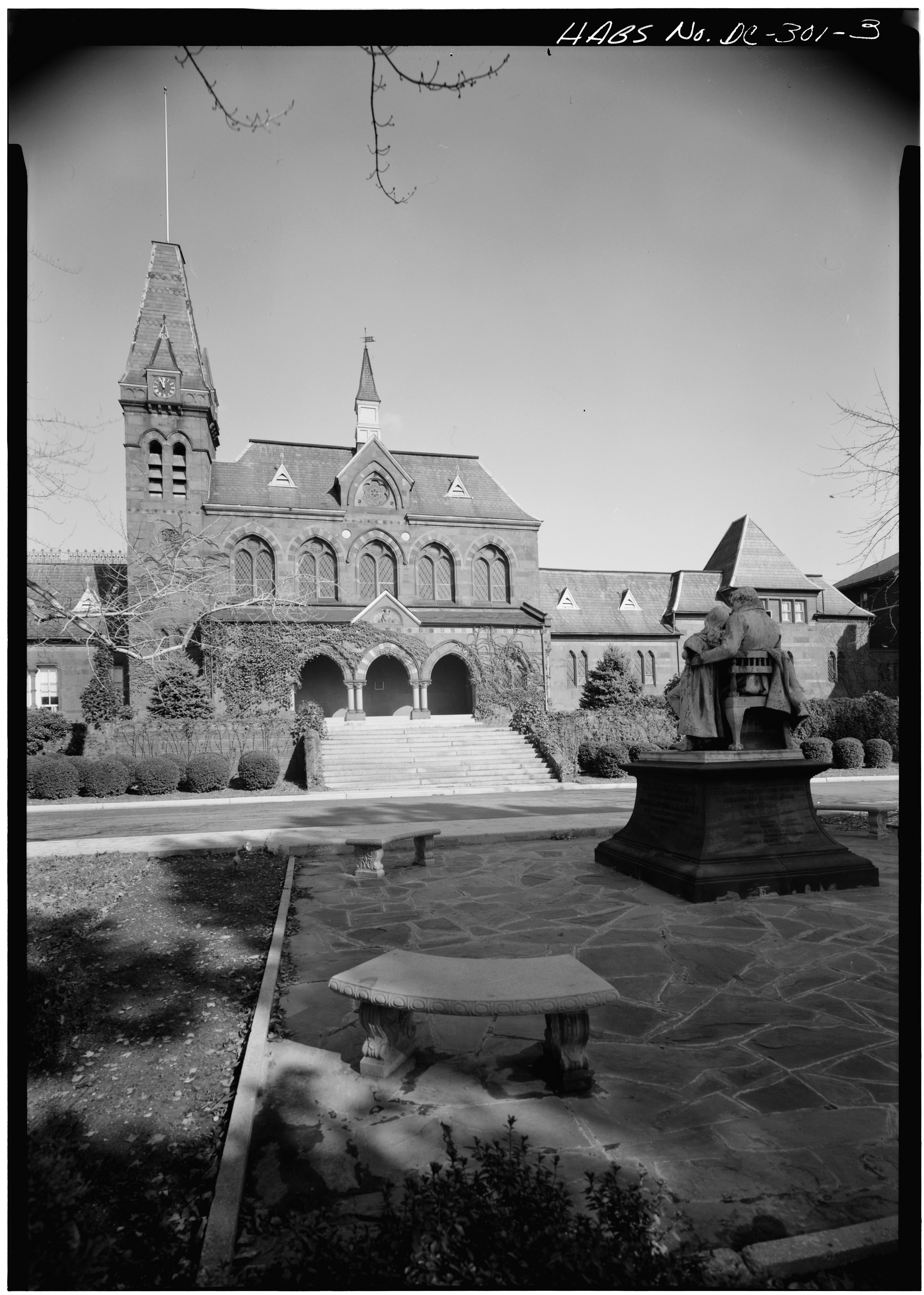
Chapel Hall

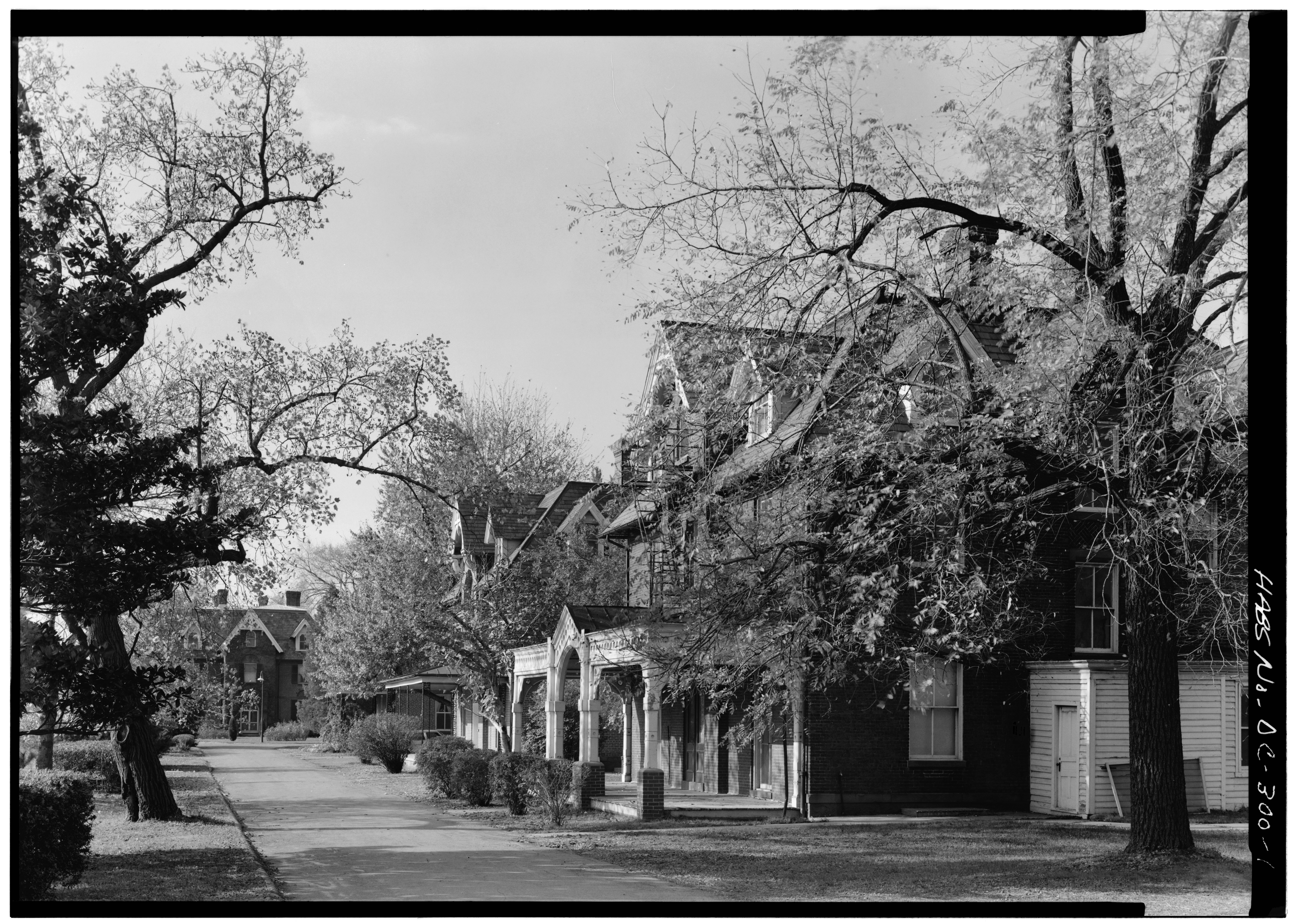
Campus view looking south toward Faculty Row

=== 20th century ===
Edward A. Fay signing "Dom Pedro's Visit to Gallaudet College" (1913)

In 1911, Congress amended the charter of the institution, changing the corporate name to "Columbia Institution for the Deaf". It would remain the legal name for the institution until 1954, when Congress amended the charter to rename it "Gallaudet College", which had been the official name of the collegiate department since 1894.

During his 17 years as Dean of the college in the 1950s and 1960s, George Ernst Detmold was a significant figure in helping the college achieve accreditation. He also led the college in developing new departments, especially drama. He directed Gallaudet theater productions, which eventually led to starting the National Theatre of the Deaf.

In 1965, professors at Gallaudet compiled the first-ever dictionary of ASL signs.

Starting in 1977, and since then, Gallaudet began offering a program to fast-track learning of ASL for incoming freshman students who aren't fluent in ASL, called JumpStart.

In 1986, Congress again amended the charter of the institution, renaming it "Gallaudet University".

=== Deaf President Now (1988) ===
Student strikes at Gallaudet University starting March 6, 1988, revolutionized the perception and education of Deaf culture. Deaf students were outraged at the selection of another hearing president, Elisabeth Zinser; the university had never selected a deaf person for this position. Alumni, faculty, staff, and students demanded that the next president of the university be deaf. After a week of protest and activism, Zinser resigned and was replaced by psychology professor and dean of the College of Arts and Sciences I. King Jordan. This movement became known as Deaf President Now (DPN).

=== Unity for Gallaudet Movement (2006) ===
Jordan announced his retirement in September 2005. On May 1, 2006, the university's board of trustees announced that Jane Fernandes, the university's then-current provost, would be the university's next president. This was met with protests from the student body – in person, on campus, and in internet blogs and forums.

Initially, students cited the lack of racial diversity among finalists, Fernandes's lack of warmth, and her lack of fluency in American Sign Language.

Jordan publicly accused some critics of rejecting Fernandes because "she is not deaf enough." He described the protest as "identity politics", saying, "We are squabbling about what it means to be deaf."

The Washington Post reported that Fernandes "would like to see the institution become more inclusive of people who might not have grown up using sign language", stating that Gallaudet must embrace "all kinds of deaf people". Those who opposed her said that they feared a "weakening of American Sign Language at an institution that should be its standard-bearer." Protesters said Fernandes distorted their arguments and that the protest centered on her inability to lead, an unfair selection process and longstanding problems at the school.

In the spring 2006 protest, students blocked entrances to the Gallaudet campus, held rallies, and set up tents near the university's main entrance. Fernandes, appointed to serve as president-designate until Jordan retired, said that she would not step down. On May 8, the faculty gave a vote of no confidence for Fernandes.

When the fall 2006 academic year resumed, some students, faculty, staff, and alumni continued their protest, calling for Fernandes to step down and for the presidential search to be done again. On October 11, a group of protesting students shut down the campus. On October 16 at a regularly scheduled meeting, faculty members voted 138 to 24 to block Fernandes from becoming president of Gallaudet University.

Fernandes said, "I really don't understand so I have to believe it's not about me. ... I believe it's about evolution and change and growth in the deaf community."

On October 29, the university withdrew the appointment of Fernandes. In an opinion piece in The Washington Post, Jordan defended Fernandes's remarks and denounced the board's decision and the actions of the protesters, saying, "I am convinced that the board made a serious error in acceding to the demands of the protesters by terminating Fernandes's presidency before it began."

On December 10, 2006, the Board of Trustees announced that Robert Davila would serve as interim president for a period of up to two years. He was formally installed on May 9, 2007, during a ceremony that included a speech by D.C. Congressional Delegate Eleanor Holmes Norton, who spoke positively of the 2006 protest. He stepped down on December 31, 2009.

On June 29, 2007, in the aftermath of the controversy over the university's presidency, Gallaudet was temporarily placed on probation by its accreditation organization, the Commission on Higher Education of the Middle States Association of Colleges and Schools. It was also reported that in 2006, the Office of Management and Budget had found that "Gallaudet failed to meet its goals or showed declining performance in key areas, including the number of students who stay in school, graduate and either pursue graduate degrees or find jobs upon graduation." In January 2007, former president Jordan wrote an editorial on the topic that appeared in The Washington Post. The Middle States Commission later reaffirmed Gallaudet's accreditation on June 27, 2008.

On October 18, 2009, the Board of Trustees announced that Gallaudet's tenth president would be Alan Hurwitz. He began his tenure on January 1, 2010, and served until he retired on December 31, 2015, succeeded by Roberta Cordano, the eleventh president.

Racial Demographics as of Fall 2023
Race and Ethnicity
All Schools	Total
White	42%
Hispanic	23%
Black	18%
Asian	5%
Two or more races	2%
Native Hawaiian/Pacific Islander	1%
American Indian/Alaska Native	1%
Unknown	8%

== Congressional charter ==
The university acknowledges that it "is a congressionally created corporation that serves governmental objectives." The university and the US Department of Education explain that Gallaudet has been structured by the Federal Government to take the form of a "federally chartered, private, non-profit educational institution." The federal government plays various roles within the institution:

- Congress incorporated the Columbia Institution in 1857, significantly amended its charter in 1954, and authorized permanent congressional appropriations. In 1986, Congress passed the Education of the Deaf Act and amended it in 1992. These Congressional acts are part of "the supreme law of Gallaudet University."
- Gallaudet must obtain authorization from the secretary of the US Department of Education in order to sell or transfer title of any of its real property.
- The diplomas of all Gallaudet graduates are signed by the current U.S. president, which dates from President U.S. Grant signing students' diplomas in 1869.
- Three members of Congress are appointed to the university's board of trustees as "Public Members".
- Gallaudet must provide annual reports to the secretary of education.
- "Gallaudet receives the bulk of its income in the form of an annual appropriation from Congress, and the Department of Education oversees the University's appropriation for the Federal government."
- Gallaudet University (and the National Technical Institute for the Deaf) are authorized to make purchases through the General Services Administration.

Gallaudet's Fifty-Fifth Annual Report contains an appendix that includes the text of 99 Federal Acts related to Gallaudet/Columbia which were enacted between 1857 and 1912.

=== Presidential visits ===
There have been 15 occasions to date in Gallaudet's history when a US president has visited either the campus or attended an official function off campus. President Johnson's second visit, in 1966, was unannounced and impromptu. President Taft had promised to attend President Percival Hall's installation on May 10, 1911, and give an address, but cancelled at the last minute before the ceremony. President Kennedy had planned to attend the centennial celebration at Gallaudet in 1964, but was assassinated.

- President Ulysses S. Grant, 1870 and 1871.
- President Rutherford B. Hayes, 1877, 1878, 1879, and 1880.
- President James A. Garfield, 1881.
- President Chester A. Arthur, 1882.
- President Grover Cleveland, 1885.
- President Benjamin Harrison, 1889 (two visits, May and June).
- President Theodore Roosevelt, 1906.
- President Lyndon Baines Johnson, 1964 and 1966.
- President Bill Clinton, 1994.

Hearing status demographics as of Fall 2024
Hearing Status
Undergraduate	Total
Deaf/Hard of Hearing	92%
Hearing	8%
Unknown	0%
Graduate	Total
Deaf/Hard of Hearing	54%
Hearing	42%
Unknown	4%
All Schools	Total
Deaf/Hard of Hearing	78%
Hearing	20%
Unknown	2%

== Academics ==
Several programs and majors are offered at Gallaudet University. The five most popular majors are business, visual and performing arts, communication studies, physical education, and psychology. Gallaudet University offers thirty graduate programs in ten Departments as well as on-line and on-campus continuing education courses. Over 90 percent of the classes offered at Gallaudet University contain fewer than 20 students. The freshman retention rate at the university is 69–77 percent, the four-year graduation rate is 17–27 percent, and the six-year graduation rate is 43–53 percent (for freshmen entering 2008–2012).

The classrooms are visually-oriented, and are organized around the philosophy of DeafSpace, such as all the desks arranged in a circle so that all students and teachers can see one another for discussions. If a professor needs to get the attention of the classroom, they will flash a light signal.

=== Schools ===
The university maintains 5 schools:

- School of Arts and Humanities
- School of Civic Leadership, Business, and Social Change
- School of Human Services and Sciences
- School of Language, Education, and Culture
- School of Science, Technology, Accessibility, Mathematics, and Public Health (STAMP)

Academic rankings

National
- U.S. News & World Report: 214 (tie)
- Washington Monthly: 315

=== Rankings and reputation ===
In 2025, U.S. News & World Report ranked Gallaudet at 214th nationwide and at 11th in the category for best value schools. The previous year, in 2024, Washington Monthly ranked Gallaudet at 315 nationwide.

== Campus ==
=== Historic designations ===
The Gallaudet campus, comprising the Gallaudet College Historic District, has been designated a historic place on several registries and surveys:

- Gallaudet College Historic District was added to the National Register of Historic Places in 1974.
- District of Columbia Inventory of Historic Sites (listings added in 1964 and 1973).
- National Historic Landmarks designation (added 1965).
- Historic American Buildings Survey (added 1933).
GU campus

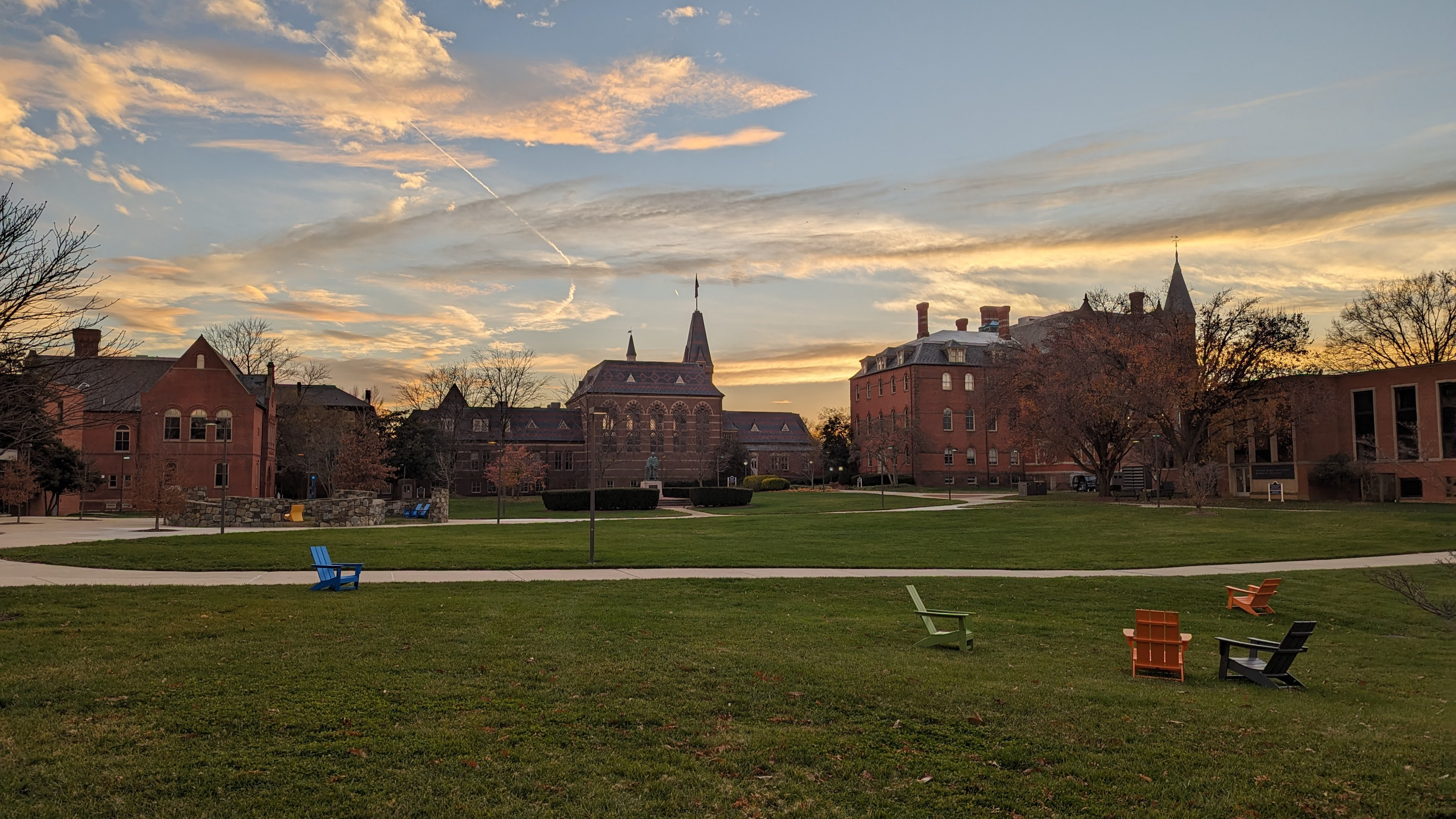
The Gallaudet Mall at the center of campus
(view as a 360° interactive panorama)

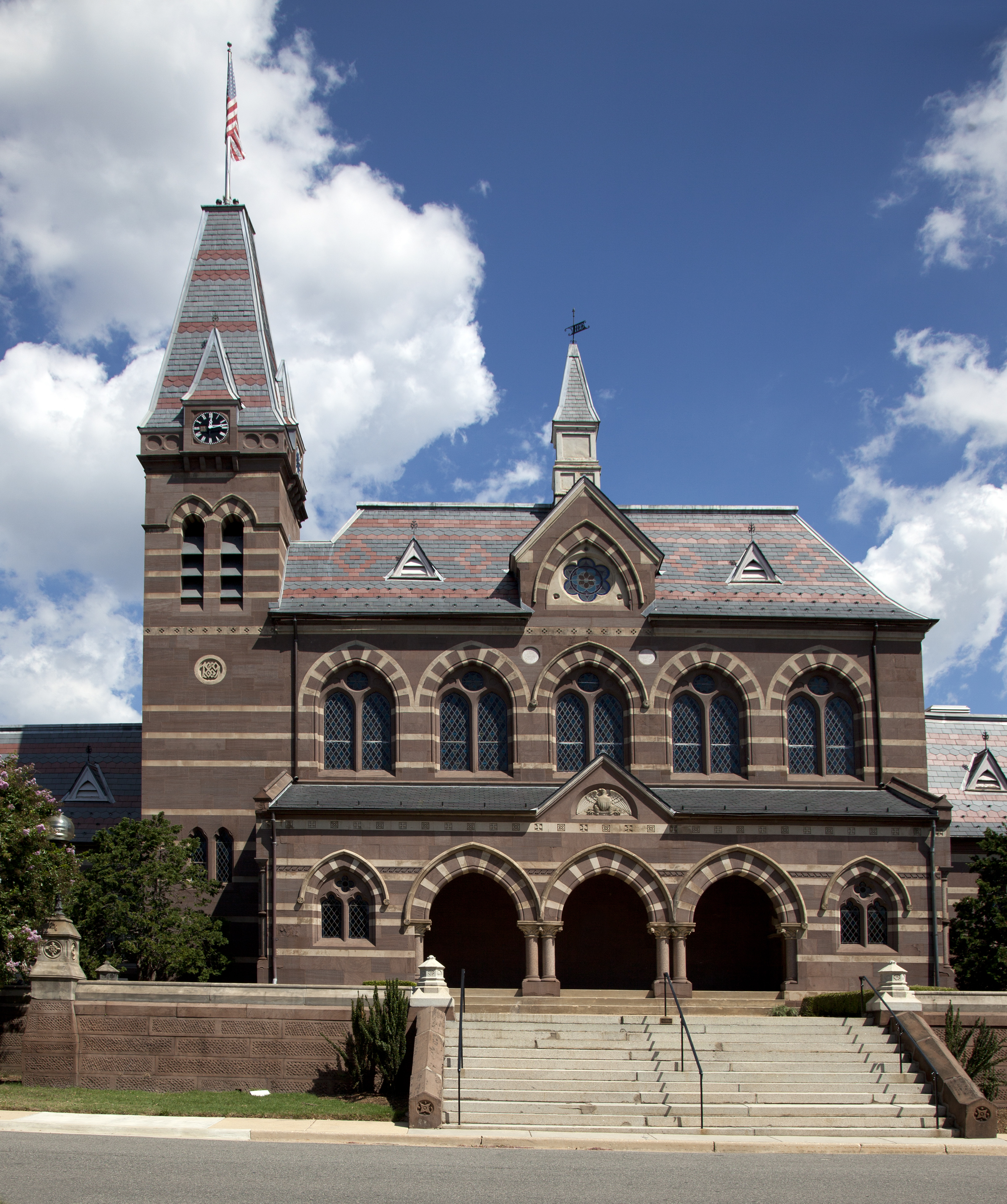
Chapel Hall

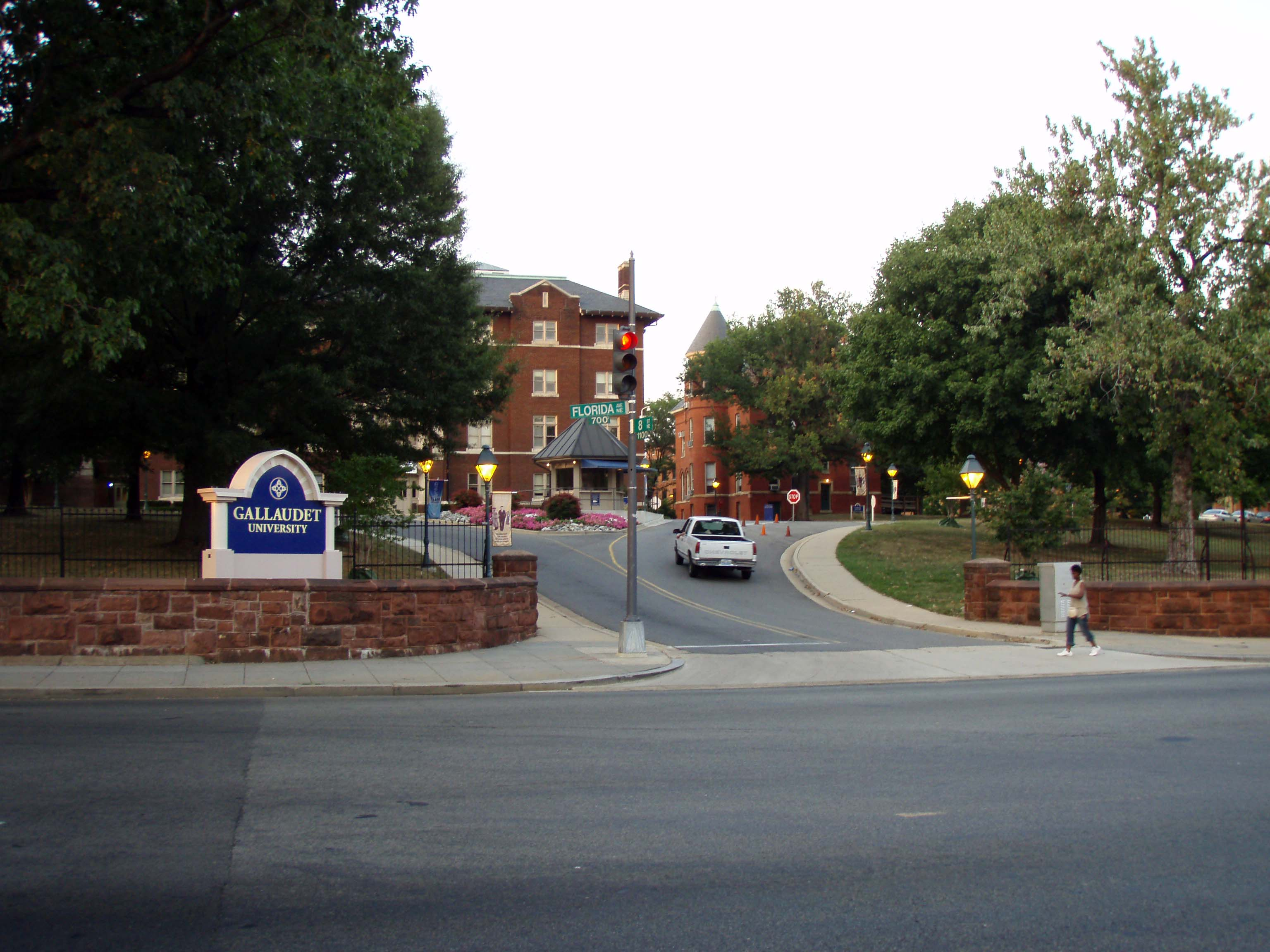
Florida Avenue entrance

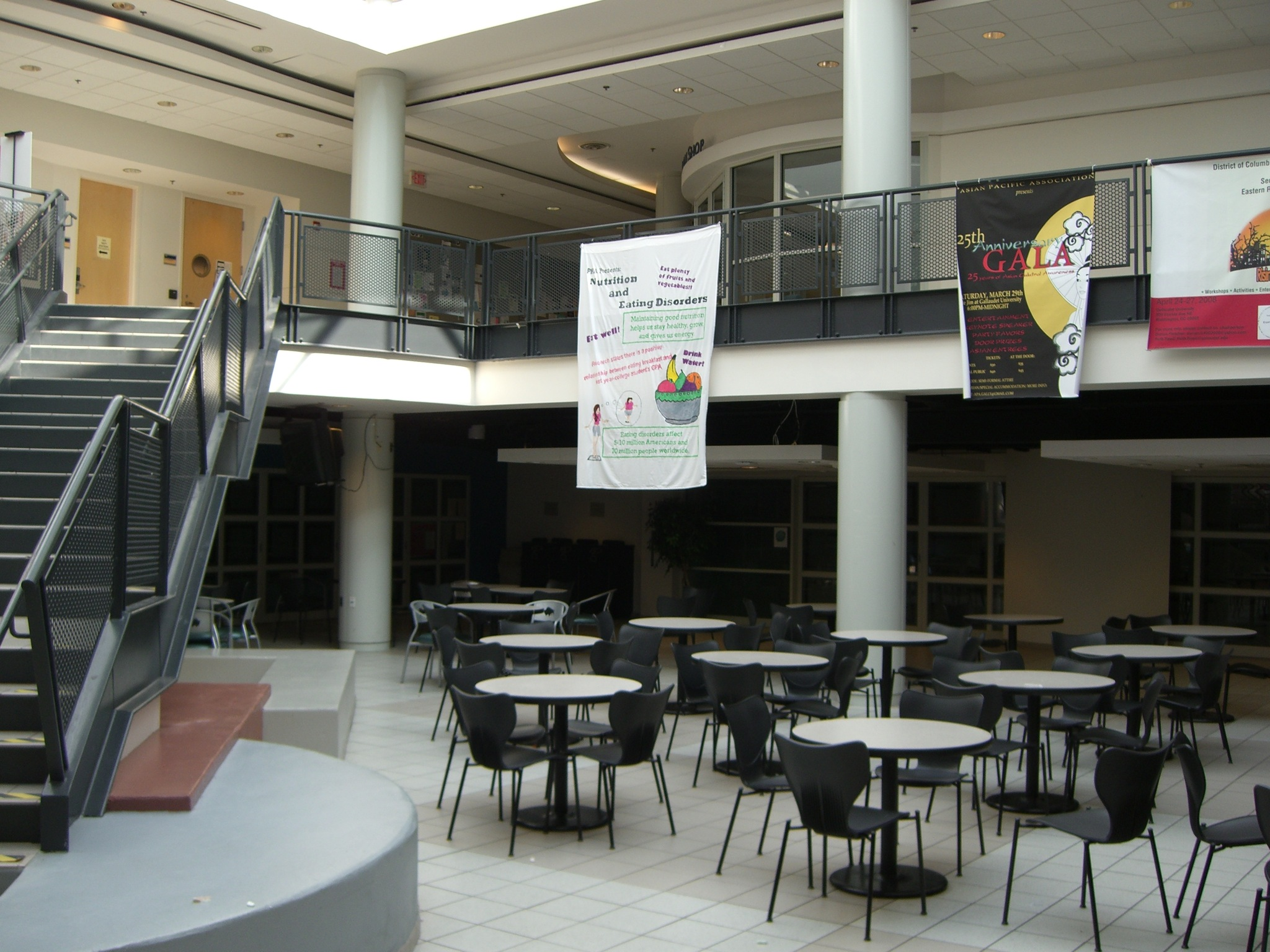
Student Academic Center (SAC)

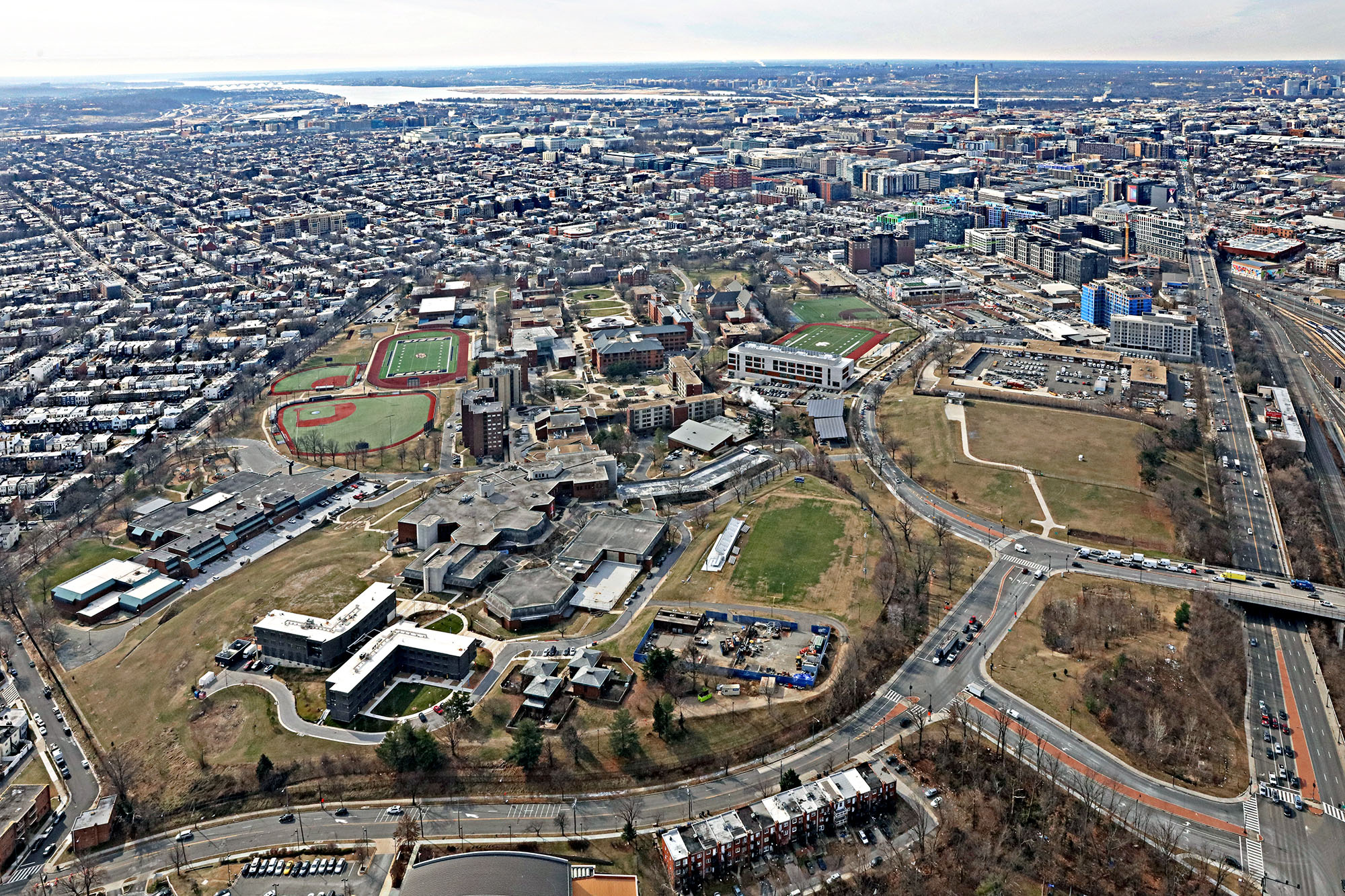
Aerial view of Gallaudet University Campus

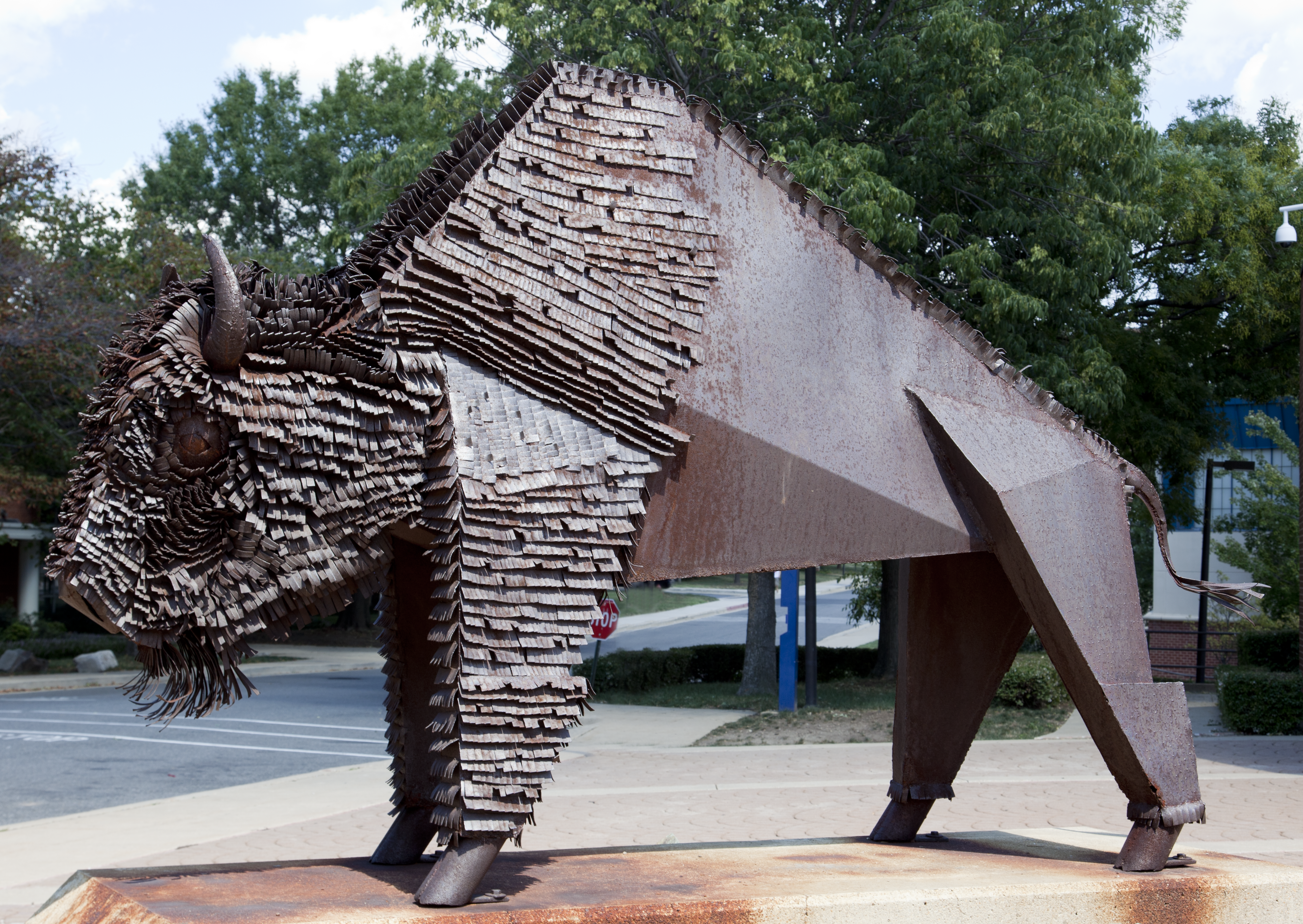
Bison, the mascot

=== Pre-college education ===
The campus is shared with Kendall Demonstration Elementary School, a day school serving deaf and hard of hearing students from birth through grade 8, and the Model Secondary School for the Deaf, a day and residential high school for deaf and hard of hearing students.

Gallaudet also operates a child development center with admissions priority for children of faculty, staff, and students. Separate from the KDES Early Childhood Program, the child development center is inclusive of, but not exclusively for, deaf and hard-of-hearing children.

=== Redevelopment of campus (2015–2024) ===
In October 2014, the Gallaudet University board of trustees announced a 10-year, $450 million development of its campus along 6th Street NE. The development, which includes both campus property as well as college-owned residential and retail property across the street, will be overseen by JBG Smith.

== Athletics ==
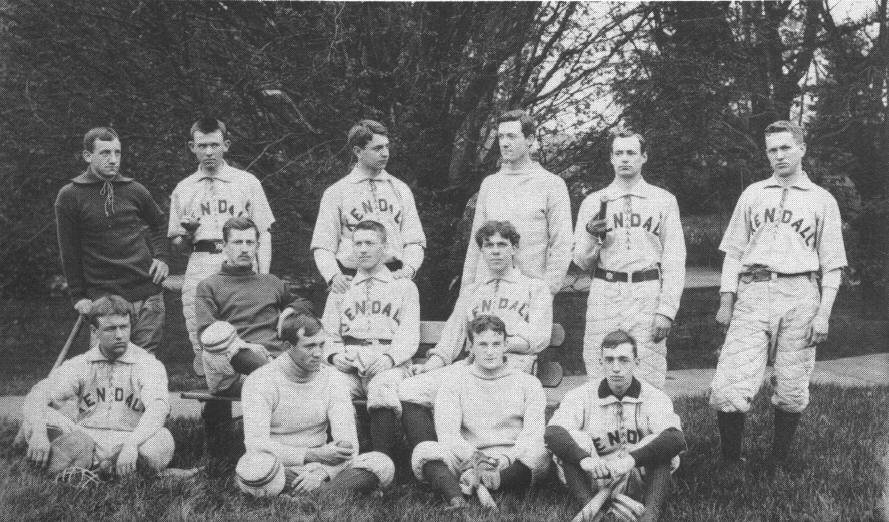
Gallaudet baseball team, 1886

Men's sports	Women's sports
Basketball	Basketball
Cross country	Cross country
Football	Flag football
Soccer	Softball
Swimming	Stunt
Track and field^{1}	Swimming
Wrestling	Track and field ^{1}
	Triathlon
	Volleyball
Co-ed sports
Disc golf
Esports
Pickleball
^{1} – includes both indoor and outdoor

Gallaudet athletic teams are the Bison. The university is a member of the Division III level of the National Collegiate Athletic Association (NCAA), primarily competing as a core member of the United East Conference (formerly known as the "North Eastern Athletic Conference" (NEAC) until after the 2020–21 academic year) for most its sports since the 2010–11 academic year; in the Eastern Collegiate Football Conference for football; and as Independents for their men's and women's swimming & diving and track & field teams. The Bison previously competed in the Capital Athletic Conference from 1989–90 to 2009–10.

Their colors are buff and blue, which were chosen after Union soldiers' uniforms in the Civil War.

=== Women's basketball ===
Gallaudet women's basketball is most known for its 1999 season, with several notable players from the Minnesota State Academy for the Deaf. The team included Ronda Jo Miller, a three-time Division III All-America selection, as well as one of the top women's volleyball players.

Under coach Kitty Baldridge, the Bison went to the NCAA Tournament for the second time in three seasons. Receiving one of the lowest seeds as an at-large team into the Division III NCAA Tournament field, which numbered 48 teams, the Bison traveled to St. Mary's College (Md.), a school which had recently defeated them in the Capital Athletic Conference tournament, and came away with an 80–73 win. In the second round, Gallaudet beat a team from The College of New Jersey which had received a first-round bye and was highly favored. The Bison advanced to the Sweet 16 round of the 1999 tournament before being eliminated by Salem State College (Mass.).

Miller finished with 2,656 points scored, 1,545 rebounds and 373 blocked shots, and was called "one of the best basketball players in Division III history" by the NCAA.

Kevin Cook coached the team briefly to success. Gallaudet began the 2010–11 season on a 20-game winning streak and finished the season 24–4 (20–2 in conference play). Cook was named North Eastern Athletic Conference Coach of the Year, and senior Easter Faafiti was voted NEAC Player of the Year. The 2010–11 season ended in the first round of the Division III NCAA Championships with a loss to Juniata.

After a victory over Penn State-Berks in the 2010–11 season, Penn State guard Corin Bishop "said that she views the Gallaudet team as a great basketball team, not a team of deaf players." Hayes of Gallaudet later said, "I feel like there are people who stereotype us as deaf players, I'm just like everyone else who plays basketball". In an interview with Lydia Lum of Diverse, he said, "Because of us, there's a growing awareness that there are differences between deaf people, but we're all the same."

=== Football ===
The football huddle originated at Gallaudet when the team noticed that their opponents were trying to see and read their signs in order to try to guess their plays.

=== Volleyball ===
In 2006, the Gallaudet women's volleyball team ended their season 30–10 after a history-making run to the Sweet Sixteen in the NCAA Division III tournament. Tamijo Foronda, a senior outside hitter, was named to the AVCA All-American Team.

=== Facilities ===
The football and soccer teams play at Hotchkiss Field with the track and field teams using Thomas Berg Track, located within Hotchkiss Field for track meets.

Basketball and volleyball use the GU Field House for their home games.

Hoy Field (named after William E. Hoy, the first deaf baseball player to play professionally) is home to the baseball team and the GU Softball Complex hosts the softball team. Both venues are made of Field Turf.

=== Noted athletes ===
Notable athletes that have attended the university include:

- Dawn Birley won several national Canadian Taekwondo championships.

== Greek life ==
The campus Greek community is relatively small with only three fraternities and three sororities: The three fraternities are Alpha Sigma Pi, Kappa Gamma, and Kappa Sigma; the three sororities are Delta Epsilon, Phi Kappa Zeta, and Kappa Theta Phi.

== National Deaf Life Museum ==
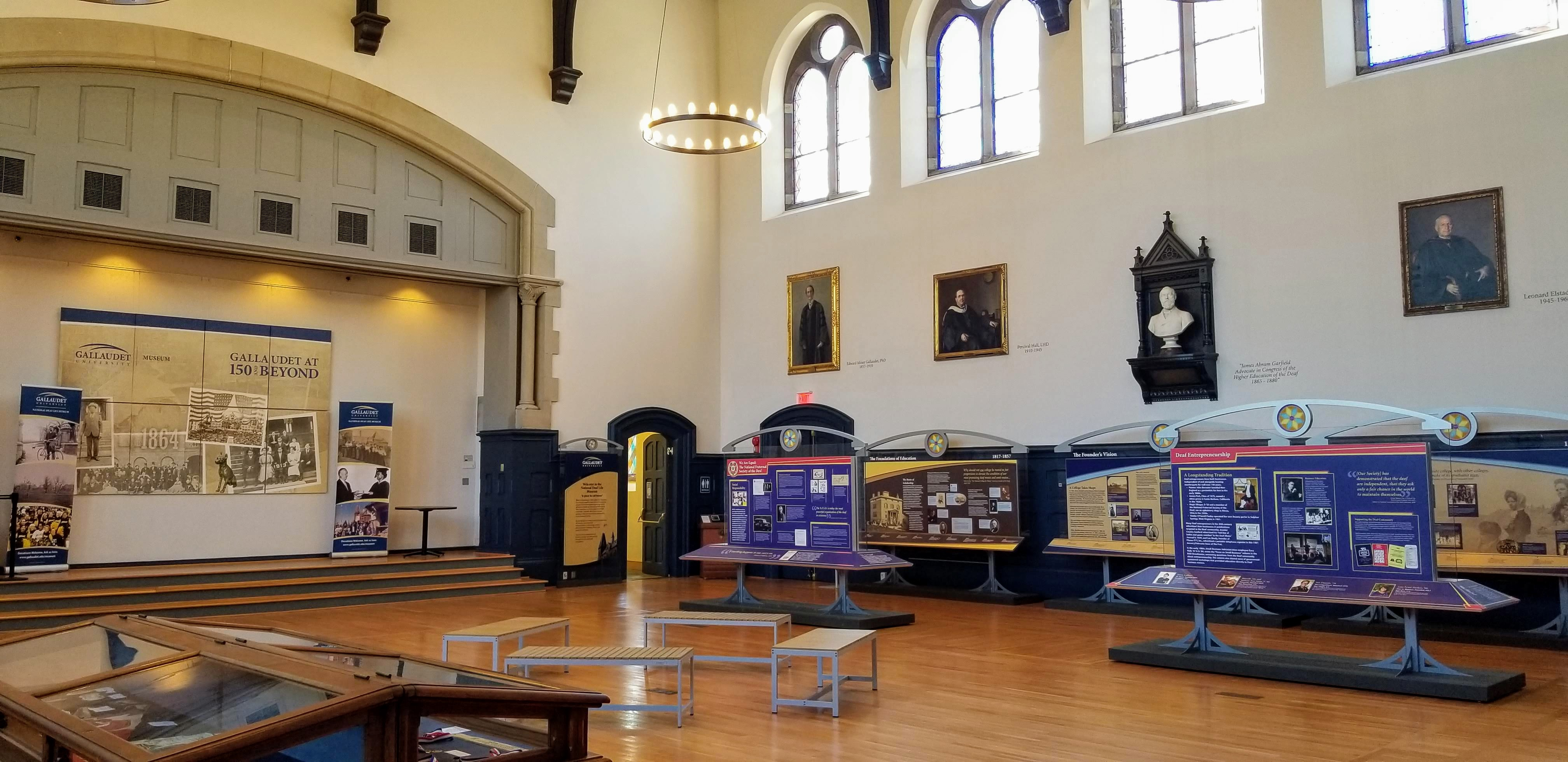
National Deaf Life Museum

Gallaudet is home to the National Deaf Life Museum, established in 2007 as the Gallaudet University Museum. The museum focuses on the culture and history of deaf and hard of hearing people in the United States, with special attention given to Gallaudet history and alumni. The museum is located in Chapel Hall, while museum staff are housed in the campus Gate House. Exhibits created by the museum include highlighting notable alumni such as Olof Hanson, Robert Panara, and Andrew Jackson Foster; "Deaf HERstory", focusing on the lives and activism of deaf women; and "Deaf Difference + Space Survival", highlighting the story of the "Gallaudet Eleven" who contributed to NASA's studies of motion sickness and weightlessness during the Space Race.

== Research ==
The Gallaudet Office of Research Support and International Affairs (RSIA) (formerly Gallaudet Research Institute or GRI) is internationally recognized for its leadership in deafness-related research. RSIA researchers gather and analyze data concerning the social, academic, and perceptual characteristics of deaf and hard of hearing populations, primarily to provide information needed by educators in the field. Staff are skilled in various research methodologies including surveys, test norming and assessment, ethnographic studies, clinical studies, and information management. In 2016, RSIA began hosting the "Gallaudet Research Expo", to give students, faculty, and staff "the opportunity to share ideas and showcase scholarly pursuits and achievements." Presentations represent "education, linguistics, STM, neuroscience, interpretation and translation, computer science, audiology, psychology, deaf studies, and other fields that reflect Gallaudet's research priorities."

Gallaudet University Press publishes two academic journals, American Annals of the Deaf (est. 1847) and Sign Language Studies (est. 1972). The Annals are "the oldest and most widely read English-language journal dealing with deafness and the education of deaf persons."

The Department of Psychology's chapter of Psi Chi publishes the journal Gallaudet Chronicles of Psychology. The journal is managed and edited by graduate student members of the chapter. The Chronicles are designed to "mimic professional, peer-reviewed journals" and provides graduate students with the opportunity to disseminate their original psychology research. In 2018, the chapter will be publishing the fifth volume of the Chronicles.

In the fall of 2010, the university's Department of Deaf Studies launched the Deaf Studies Digital Journal (DSDJ), the first peer-reviewed academic and creative arts journal in American Sign Language and English. The DSDJ itself is published in entirely video-based content and is available online. To date, only four issues of DSDJ have been released, the most recent being published in 2014.

== People ==
=== Notable alumni ===
- Ben Bahan – actor, professor and researcher
- Linda Bove – actress
- Bernard Bragg – actor
- Rodney Burford – actor
- Dorothy Casterline – linguist and professor
- James Caverly – actor
- John Lee Clark – writer and activist
- Carl Croneberg – linguist and college professor
- Robert R. Davila – 9th President of Gallaudet
- Nyle DiMarco – American actor, model and activist
- Daniel Durant – actor
- Andrew Foster – missionary, first self-identified Black Deaf person to earn a bachelor's degree at Gallaudet
- Sandra Mae Frank - actress
- Phyllis Frelich – actress
- Gertrude Scott Galloway – educator
- Jack R. Gannon – educator, coach, and author
- Tyrone Giordano – actor
- Samuel Thomas Greene – early Deaf teacher
- Alice Lougee Hagemeyer – librarian
- Olof Hanson – American architect
- Russell Harvard – actor
- Bruce Hlibok – playwright, author, actor
- I. King Jordan Jr. – 8th President of Gallaudet
- Troy Kotsur – actor
- Ella Mae Lentz – poet
- Florence Lewis May – art historian
- Carolyn McCaskill – counselor and professor
- Dorothy Miles – British poet and activist
- Wilma Newhoudt-Druchen – South African politician
- Jane Norman – director and educator
- Robert Panara – professor of deaf culture studies
- Louise Stern – writer and artist
- Shoshannah Stern – actress
- Clayton Valli – linguist
- George Veditz – teacher, American Sign Language filmmaker, preserver of American Sign Language

=== Notable faculty ===
- Percival Hall Sr. 1895–1953
- John B. Hotchkiss 1869–1922
- Elizabeth Peet 1900-1950
- Edward Miner Gallaudet 1864–1910
- Elizabeth English Benson 1926–1970
- William C. Stokoe, Jr. 1955–1984
- R. Orin Cornett 1965–1984
- Teresa Blankmeyer Burke 2005–present
- Betty G. Miller 1959–1977
- Jane Norman 1987–2013

== See also ==
- American School for the Deaf
- American Sign Language
- Bilingual-bicultural education
- National Association of the Deaf (United States) (NAD)
- National Technical Institute for the Deaf (NTID)
- Willy Conley
- Andrew Foster (educator)
- Francis Maginn
- William Stokoe
