= Dement =

Dement is a surname. Notable people with the surname include:

- Ada Belle Dement (1888–1945), American civil rights and suffrage activist
- George Dement (1922–2014), mayor of Bossier City, Louisiana, from 1989 to 2005
- Henry D. Dement (1840–1927), American politician
- John Dement (1804–1883), American politician and militia commander from Illinois
- Iris DeMent (born 1961), American singer and songwriter
- Kenneth Dement (1933–2013), American football player
- Mike Dement (born 1954), American college basketball coach
- William C. Dement (born 1928), American sleep researcher

== See also ==
- Ira De Ment (1931–2011), United States federal judge
- Dement Township, Ogle County, Illinois
- Dement Printing Company, a historic printing company in Meridian, Mississippi
- Dement House (disambiguation), several historic houses
