= Zinser =

Zinser is a surname. Notable people with the surname include:

- Adolfo Aguilar Zínser (1949–2005), Mexican diplomat and politician
- Bill Zinser (1920–2001), American baseball player
- Elisabeth Zinser (born 1940), American college president
- Gillian Zinser (born 1985), American actress
- Hartmut Zinser (born 1944), American religious scholar
- John Zinser (American football) (born 1967), American football player
- John Zinser (game designer), American game designer
- Stephen Zinser (born. c 1958), American hedge fund manager
- Wolfgang Zinser (born 1964), American triple jumper

== See also ==
- Dement-Zinser House, a historic house in Washington, Illinois, United States
- Zinsser
