= Dement House =

Dement House may refer to:

- Dement House (Meridian, Mississippi), a Mississippi Landmark
- Dement House (Lascassas, Tennessee), listed on the National Register of Historic Places in Rutherford County, Tennessee
- Dement-Zinser House, Washington, Illinois, listed on the National Register of Historic Places in Tazewell County, Illinois

== See also ==
- Dement Printing Company, Meridian, Mississippi, listed on the National Register of Historic Places in Lauderdale County, Mississippi
