= Zunser =

Zunser is a surname. Notable people with the surname include:

- Eliakum Zunser (1836–1913), Lithuanian Jewish Yiddish-language poet and songwriter
- Miriam Shomer Zunser (1882–1951), American journalist, playwright, and artist

== See also ==
- Zinser
