= Edward C. Merrill Jr. =

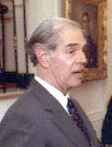
- Merrill in 1981

4th President of Gallaudet University
- In office July 1, 1969 – September 30, 1983
- Preceded by: Leonard M. Elstad
- Succeeded by: W. Lloyd Johns

Personal details
- Born: January 29, 1920
- Died: January 27, 1995 (aged 74)

Edward C. Merrill Jr. (January 29, 1920 – January 27, 1995) was the fourth President of Gallaudet University in Washington, D.C. Under his administration from 1969 to 1983, the College made preparations for the expanded population of deaf students due to the Rubella epidemic in the 1960s. This was called "The Rubella Bulge." Dr. Merrill also oversaw the era of the Stokoe Linguistics Lab, when the use of American Sign Language as a natural human language acquired increasing acceptance in Deaf education. He obtained a bachelor's in English from the University of North Carolina in 1942, a master's in Educational Administration and Supervision from the University of Tennessee in 1948, and a Ph.D. Degree in Educational Administration from George Peabody College for Teachers in 1954. He was awarded an honorary LL.D. degree by Gallaudet in 1969.

Academic offices
Preceded by Leonard M. Elstad	President of Gallaudet University; July 1, 1969 – September 30, 1983	Succeeded by W. Lloyd Johns
