= W. Lloyd Johns =

5th President of Gallaudet University
- In office October 1, 1983 – January 18, 1984
- Preceded by: Edward C. Merrill Jr.
- Succeeded by: Jerry C. Lee

Personal details
- Born: May 25, 1930
- Died: January 8, 2024 (aged 93)

W. Lloyd Johns (May 25, 1930 – January 8, 2024) was an American politician and the fifth president of Gallaudet University (then Gallaudet College) from October 1, 1983 until January 18, 1984.

After the announcement of his appointment in March 1983, Johns told Gallaudet students that: "The future strength of this college lies in continuing and expanding its research and teaching work not only nationally but internationally through the use of new communications technology," and he had plans to expand course offerings in computing technology. Johns also had plans to focus on using the science of economics as head administrator of Gallaudet, as it pertained to the issues of financial efficiency and cost-effectiveness. Johns told a reporter in 1984: "A college and university is not just an academic institution nor is it just a business. It's both... In this day and age, any college or university president who does not run that enterprise as a business is not going to last long. ...By the same token, I don't think you can be so cost-effective that the only criterion is the dollar." Johns also had a philosophy of upholding high academic standards: "We should make [higher education] as accessible as possible to all who can benefit by it, but we have to maintain standards to make it respectable. Accessible higher education does not mean watering down the standards so that anyone who wants a degree can walk away with one..." Johns was a progressive educator who followed principles of shared governance and democratic accountability, having sought the participation of the National Association of the Deaf and Gallaudet's alumni.

Prior to becoming Gallaudet President, Johns had worked as an elementary school teacher and also principal at both the junior high, and high school levels. In 1965 he became an assistant professor of Educational Administration at California State University, Northridge and later served as assistant to the dean of the School of Education, then Director of A-V Services, then Associate Vice-president of Business and Administrative Affairs. In 1975 he became vice president for Administrative Affairs and Educational Services at Sonoma State University, then served as Acting President there in 1976–1977. In 1977 he was appointed Executive Vice President at California State University, Sacramento and then served as president there from 1978 to 1983. He obtained an Ed.D. in Educational Administration from the University of Southern California.

Johns died on January 8, 2024, at the age of 93.

== See also ==
- Brenneman, Richard J. 1983. CSUS President Johns Bids Adieu. The Sacramento Bee (June 26, 1983, p. B1)

Academic offices
Preceded by Edward C. Merrill Jr.	President of Gallaudet University; October 1, 1983 – January 18, 1984	Succeeded by Jerry C. Lee
