= University of Idaho Golf Course =

- Location in the United States Location in Idaho
- 46.723°N 117.017°W

Club information
- Location: 1215 Nez Perce Drive; University of Idaho; Moscow, Idaho, U.S.
- Elevation: 2,560–2,720 ft (780–830 m)
- Established: 1937; 89 years ago (9 holes); 1970; 56 years ago (18 holes)
- Type: Public
- Owner: University of Idaho
- Operator: University of Idaho
- Tota holes: 18
- Website: UI Golf Course
- Designed by: Francis L. James - 1936; Bob Baldock - 1968
- Par: 72 - (37 out, 35 in)
- Length: 6,637 yards (6,069 m)
- Course rating: 72.3
- Slope rating: 128
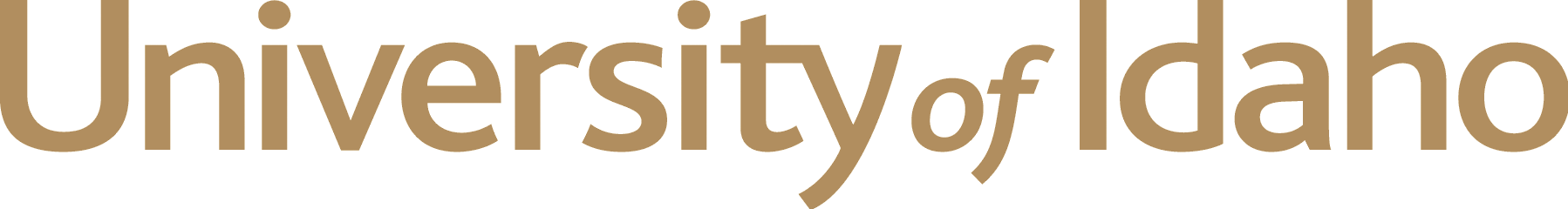

The University of Idaho Golf Course is an 18-hole public facility in the northwest United States, on the campus of the University of Idaho in Moscow, Idaho.

Set in the rolling hills of the Palouse of north central Idaho, a mile (1.6 km) east of the border with Washington, the par-72 course is at an average elevation of 2,650 feet (810 m) above sea level. The back tees measure a moderate 6,602 yards (6,037 m), but the significant elevation changes, terraced fairways, and often breezy conditions contribute to make it a challenging track. The slope rating is 128, with a course rating of 72.3; the men's tees (gold) are at 6,106 yards (5,583 m), with a slope of 122 and a course rating of 69.5.

The course is open eight months per year, March through October, and is located on the western end of Nez Perce Drive, directly south of the Kibbie Dome stadium and the century-old Shattuck Arboretum. The newer UI Arboretum borders on the east, along and below the 17th & 18th holes. The President's House (now Executive Residence) is across the street, northeast of the 18th green.

== History ==
The first nine holes were opened 89 years ago in 1937, on the southwest edge of campus, designed by Englishman Francis L. "Frank" James (1877-1952). At the time a Portland resident, he had designed over a hundred courses, including the other two 9-hole courses in the area: the Moscow Elks course east of town in the late 1920s, and the reconstruction of the original WSC course in nearby Pullman, Washington in 1934. James became the course manager, resident professional, and UI golf coach. Following his death in 1952, the recently completed clubhouse was named for him.

The original order of play, using the current hole numbers, was 1, 2, 8, 11, 12, 13, 14, 15, 9 for par 35 at 3,185 yards (2,912 m). Before the second nine was constructed, there was also a pitch-and-putt course north of the original nine holes.

The second nine holes (four east (# 10, 16-18) and five north & west (# 3-7) of the original nine) were constructed from 1968 to 1970, designed by golf course architect Bob E. Baldock, and the current clubhouse was built in 1969. A former professional golfer from Newport Beach, California, Baldock designed hundreds of courses in the West, including Hangman Valley south of Spokane, Sun Willows in Pasco, Crane Creek C.C. in Boise, Meadow Creek in New Meadows, and the Lewiston Country Club.

All 18 holes at the UI course opened for play 56 years ago in August 1970 with some minor modifications to the original nine. The front and back nines were switched in the 1990s, and both nines contain original holes and newer ones. The course was formerly par 71, as the 7th hole (formerly #16), currently a downhill par-5, was a par-4 prior to the addition of new tee boxes and the greenside pond. The greenside ponds on the current 1st and 7th holes were added in the mid-1990s. The lowest part of the course is in the southwest corner at the twelfth green; at approximately 2,560 feet (780 m), it is 170 vertical feet (52 m) below the clubhouse.

The par-5 fourth hole was part of the grade of the old road to Pullman. The massive water tank behind its green (west) was added in 1980 to satisfy insurance requirements for campus firefighting; the tank north of the tee box was completed in 2010, for chilled water storage for campus air conditioning.

The course was originally owned and operated by the Associated Students of the University of Idaho (ASUI), the student government. The university took control of the course in 1986, and the lounge was remodeled in 1990.

The UI course became the senior 18-hole venue on the Palouse eighteen years ago in 2008, when Washington State University in Pullman opened its long-anticipated Palouse Ridge Golf Club in late August.

== Vandal Golf & Professional Golf Management ==
The UI Golf Course is the home of the Vandal golf teams, which compete in the Big Sky Conference of the NCAA. Idaho was formerly a member of the Western Athletic Conference (WAC) (2005–14), Big West (1996–2005), Big Sky (1963–96), and Pacific Coast (1922–59) conferences.

The university offers a bachelor's degree in Professional Golf Management, a five-year program in the College of Business and Economics. Launched in 2002, it is the only PGA-accredited college program in the Northwest and one of 20 in the nation.

== Scorecard ==
University of Idaho Golf Course
Tee	Rating/Slope	1	2	3	4	5	6	7	8	9	Out	10	11	12	13	14	15	16	17	18	In	Total
Black	72.3 / 128	386	156	390	556	171	491	491	375	293	3309	375	406	400	504	227	351	383	232	415	3293	6602
Gold	69.5 / 122	355	139	376	526	147	473	478	334	276	3104	302	391	377	484	202	295	365	204	382	3002	6106
Silver	72.5 / 125	323	123	325	436	118	459	459	327	258	2828	293	375	353	465	192	281	349	177	372	2857	5685
Par		4	3	4	5	3	5	5	4	4	37	4	4	4	5	3	4	4	3	4	35	72
SI		11	15	9	1	17	5	3	7	13		18	10	14	2	8	16	12	4	6
