= University of Idaho Arboretum and Botanical Garden =

Arboretum and botanical garden located in Idaho, United States

Coordinates: 46.722°N 117.015°W

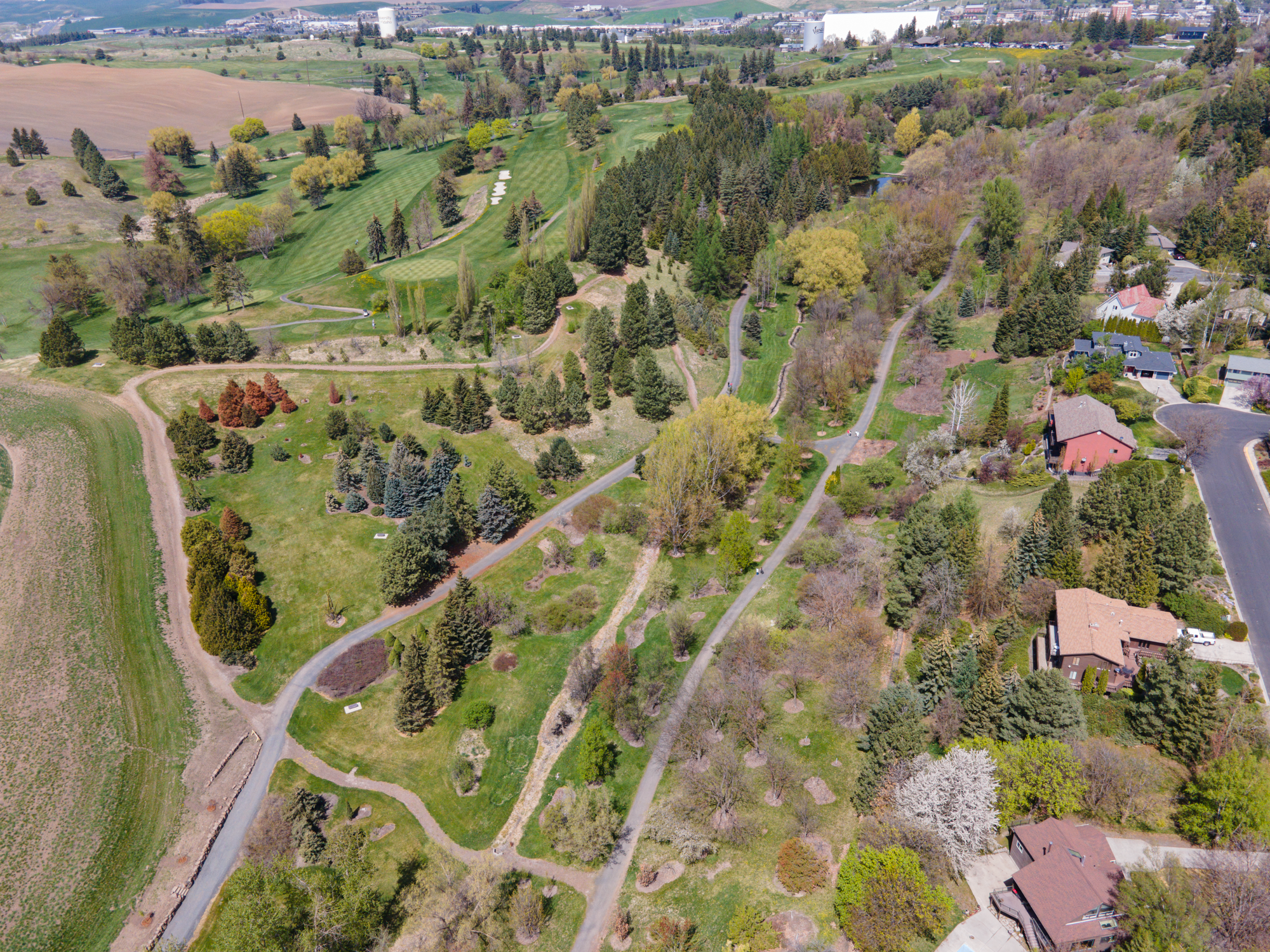
- Aerial view of the arboretum.
- Interactive map of University of Idaho Arboretum and Botanical Garden
- Website: Official website

The University of Idaho Arboretum and Botanical Garden is a major arboretum and botanical garden in the northwestern United States, on the campus of the University of Idaho in Moscow, Idaho. Located within a valley south of the President's Residence on Nez Perce Drive and adjacent to the UI Golf Course, its 63 acres (0.25 km^{2}) are open to the public daily without charge.

== Shattuck Arboretum ==
The university's first arboretum was established 116 years ago in 1910 by Dr. Charles Houston Shattuck (1867–1931), the university's first professor of forestry and the first dean of the College of Forestry. He began planting a 14-acre (5.7 ha) slope with hundreds of introduced trees and shrubs. His legacy, now a grove of mature trees, is one of Western North America's oldest university plantings with superior specimens of American Beech, California Incense-cedar, Field Maple, Eastern Hemlock, and an excellent Giant Sequoia.

The older arboretum is located immediately west of the UI Administration Building and north of the President's Residence; it was named for Shattuck in 1933, two years after his death, and was the southern boundary of MacLean Field. Adjacent to the arboretum is an amphitheater available for lectures, concerts, barbecues, weddings, and other events.

== New Development ==
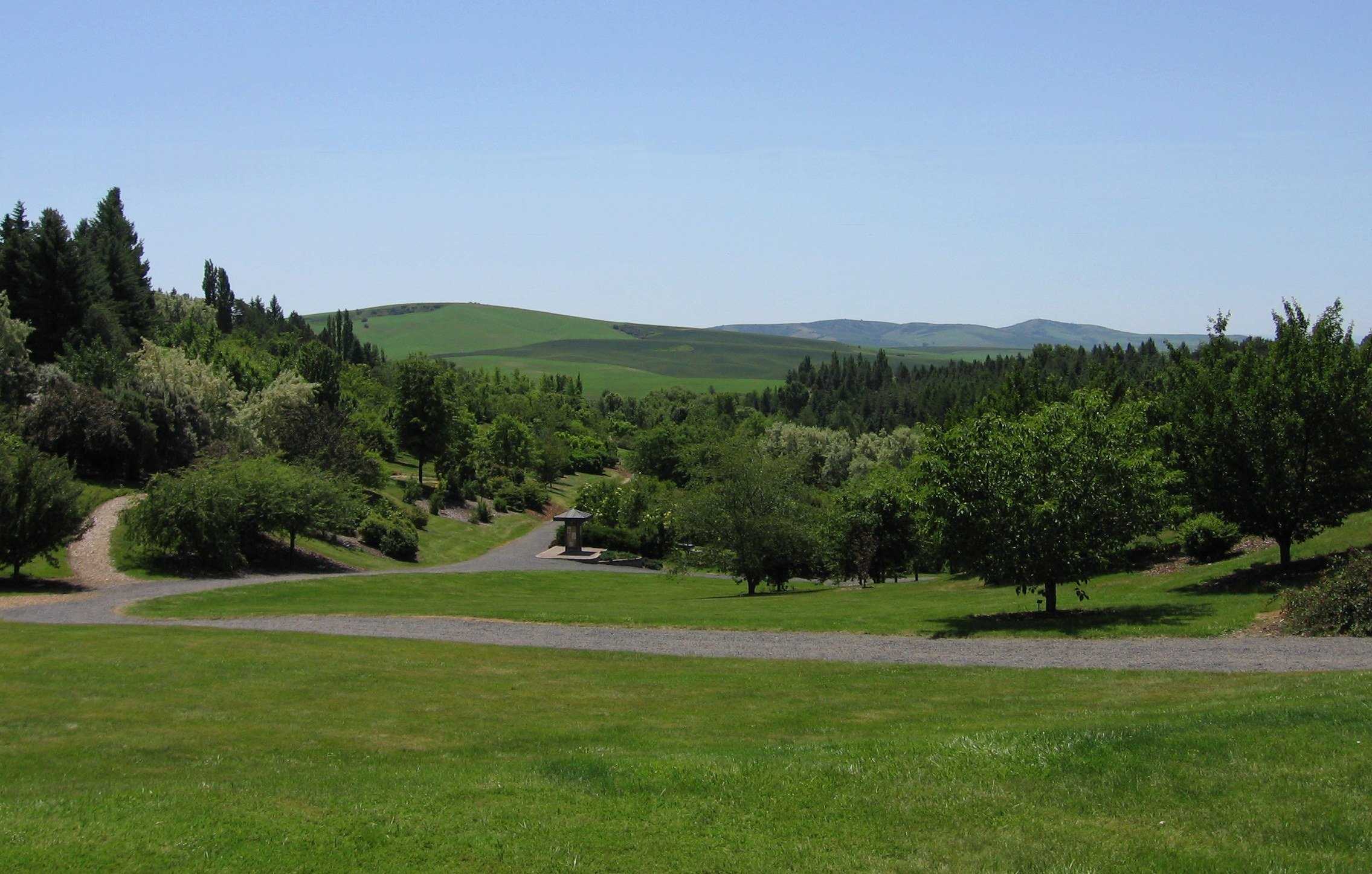
The Arboretum in 2006, viewed from the north entrance looking south.

The "New Arboretum" was conceived in the late 1970s with its first plantings in the former hayfield in 1982. It is divided into four geographical areas of plant origin: Asia, Europe, Eastern North America, and Western North America. In addition, there are sections for display plantings and a xeriscape garden. The arboretum contains 829 species and 1799 taxa of trees and woody shrubs (as of 2005), with planting continuing at a sustained pace. For example, a total of 132 species and 270 taxa were planted in 2004.

Conifers, ornamental species and cultivars of pear, forsythia, cherry, crabapple, lilac, shrub rose, mock orange, magnolia, tree peony, maple, oak, and elm constitute the bulk of the collection. There are also dozens of unusual specimens. Some of the less common trees for the region include Dawn Redwood (Metasequoia glyptostroboides), Ginkgo (Ginkgo biloba), Camperdown Elms (Ulmus glabra 'Camperdownii'), and cultivars of European beech (Fagus sylvatica).

The arboretum has many walking trails and benches; the loop distance around the arboretum is about 1.4 miles (2.3 km).

The first wedding held in the new arboretum was in July 1991; the bride was university president Elisabeth Zinser.

== See also ==
- List of botanical gardens in the United States
