= Jerry C. Lee =

American university administrator

6th President of Gallaudet University
- In office May 20, 1984 – January 1, 1988
- Preceded by: W. Lloyd Johns
- Succeeded by: Elisabeth Zinser

2nd President of National University
- In office 1989–2001

Chancellor of National University System
- In office 2001–2013

Personal details
- Born: November 21, 1941 (age 83)

Jerry C. Lee (born November 21, 1941) was the sixth president of Gallaudet University (Gallaudet College until 1986) from 1984 to 1988, later becoming the President of National University in La Jolla, California from 1989 to 2001 and Chancellor of the reorganized National University System from 2001 to 2013.

== Early life, family and education ==
Lee received a bachelor degree from West Virginia Wesleyan College in 1963 where he studied history and psychology and was interested in sports and business. He then earned both a master of arts degree (1975) and a doctor of education degree (1977) from Virginia Polytechnic Institute & State University (Washington Dulles International Airport program). He had been enrolled in the West Virginia Graduate School of Industrial Relations from 1963 to 1964, but did not obtain a graduate degree, then studied for two years at the University of Baltimore School of Law from 1967 to 1969, but did not earn a J.D. degree.

== Career ==
Lee worked as a management trainee/industrial relations administrator at General Motors' Fisher Body Division from 1964 to 1965. He was Vice President of Administration at Commercial Credit Industrial Corporation in suburban Washington, DC, from 1965 to 1971. From 1971 to 1977, he served as the Director of General Services (Business/Administration) at Gallaudet and was promoted to Assistant Vice President for Business Affairs there in 1978 and promoted again to Vice President of Administration and Business in 1982.

In 1986 he was a member of the board of directors of the Deafness Research Foundation. During Lee's tenure as president of Gallaudet, satellite campuses were established in Hawaii, Texas, Florida, and Puerto Rico. He had previously announced upon accepting the position of Gallaudet president that he was only serving on a temporary basis.

In August 1987, Lee was hired by Jane Bassett Spilman, Gallaudet's board chair, to work as a vice president at Bassett Furniture of southwestern Virginia, whereupon he stepped down as Gallaudet President. In 1989, he was hired to become the President of National University, headquartered in California, which served students in California, Nevada, and Costa Rica. He was promoted to chancellor in 2001 when National University was reorganized. He retired in 2013.

He served in the US Army Reserve from 1966 to 1972.

== Speeches and publications ==
- "Deafness: The Next Ten Years," Journal of Rehabilitation, Vol. 51, No. 4, Oct/Nov/Dec 1985
- "Deaf Education in America," presentation to the Chicago Laryngological and Otological Society, Chicago, Illinois, March 1986.

Academic offices
| Preceded by W. Lloyd Johns | President of Gallaudet University; May 20, 1984– January 1, 1988 | Succeeded by Elisabeth Zinser |
