= Zinsser =

Zinsser is a surname. Notable people with the surname include:

- Frederick G. Zinsser (1868–1956), American businessman
- Hans Zinsser (1878–1940), American physician, bacteriologist and writer
- William Zinsser (1922–2015), American writer, editor, literary critic and teacher

== See also ==
- Zinser
- Rust-Oleum, for the owner of the paint brand
