= Leonard M. Elstad =

American academic (1899–1990)

3rd President of Gallaudet University
- In office July 1, 1945 – July 1, 1969
- Preceded by: Percival Hall
- Succeeded by: Edward C. Merrill Jr.

Personal details
- Born: February 8, 1899
- Died: June 27, 1990 (aged 91)

Leonard M. Elstad (February 8, 1899 – June 27, 1990) was the third President of Gallaudet University (then Gallaudet College) in Washington, D.C. Elstad, who obtained a Master's degree from Gallaudet in 1923 and two honorary degrees later in his life, presided over an important period of Gallaudet's history, which came to be called the "Elstad Expansion Era," when Gallaudet achieved accreditation (1957) and was significantly expanded, both in terms of enrollment and the number and capacity of the buildings on campus.

Academic offices
Preceded by Percival Hall	President of Gallaudet University; July 1, 1945–July 1, 1969	Succeeded by Edward C. Merrill Jr.
