= Elisabeth Zinser =

University President

7th President of Gallaudet University
- In office March 6, 1988 – March 10, 1988
- Preceded by: Jerry C. Lee
- Succeeded by: I. King Jordan

President of the University of Idaho
- In office 1989–1995

Chancellor of the University of Kentucky
- In office 1995–2001

President of Southern Oregon University
- In office 2001–2006

Personal details
- Born: February 20, 1940 (age 86) Meadville, Pennsylvania, U.S.
- Spouse: W. Don Mackin (m. 1991; died 2011)
- Awards: AAC&U Distinguished Fellow (2016)

Elisabeth Ann Zinser (born February 20, 1940) is a retired university president, most recently at Southern Oregon University (2001–2006) in Ashland. Previously she was the chancellor of the Lexington campus of the University of Kentucky (1995–2001), and the first female president of the University of Idaho, in Moscow, serving from 1989 until 1995.

She holds a bachelor's degree from Stanford, a master's from UCSF, and a doctorate from the University of California, Berkeley. She also received an MBA from the MIT Sloan School of Management.

Prior to assuming the presidency at the University of Idaho, Zinser received national attention in 1988 when she was named the seventh president of Gallaudet University in Washington, DC. She served for less than a week, March 6–10, and then resigned due to protests over her selection in what came to be known as the "Deaf President Now" protest, saying that the protest was "a monumental event in the history of deaf culture". The protesters thanked her for making a graceful exit, noting that she had become an "innocent victim and an unfortunate target" of their collective anger.

== Personal ==
A native of Meadville, Pennsylvania, Zinser is a former board member of the Oregon Shakespeare Festival in Ashland.

While at Idaho in 1991, she married W. Don Mackin; the wedding was the first in the university's new arboretum. Mackin (1937–2011) was a graduate of Washington State University in nearby Pullman and a former Idaho state senator. They were married for two decades, until he unexpectedly died in his sleep at age 73 in Ashland.

Academic offices
Preceded by Jerry C. Lee	President of Gallaudet University; March 6–11, 1988	Succeeded by I. King Jordan
Preceded by Richard D. Gibb	President of University of Idaho; 1989–1995	Succeeded by Thomas O. Bell (acting)
Preceded by Sara Hopkins-Powell (interim)	President of Southern Oregon University; 2001–2006	Succeeded by Mary Cullinan
