= Palouse Ridge Golf Club =

- Location in the United States Location in Washington
- 46.738°N 117.142°W

Club information
- Location: 1260 Palouse Ridge Drive; Washington State University; Pullman, Washington, U.S.
- Elevation: 2,600 feet (790 m) AMSL
- Established: 2008; 18 years ago 1925; 101 years ago (former 9 holes)
- Type: Public
- Owner: Washington State University
- Operator: Washington State University
- Total holes: 18
- Website: www.palouseridge.com
- Designed by: John Harbottle III
- Par: 72
- Length: 7,308 yards (6,682 m)
- Course rating: 75.5
- Slope rating: 144

Palouse Ridge Golf Club is an 18-hole championship golf course in the northwest United States, located at Washington State University in Pullman, Washington. On the east edge of campus on the Palouse of the Inland Northwest, it opened for play eighteen years ago in 2008 and is the home venue of the Cougar golf teams of the Pac-12 Conference.

Designed by John Harbottle III (1958–2012), its back tees (Crimson) are at 7,308 yards (6,682 m); the course rating is 75.4 with a slope rating of 140. The average elevation is approximately 2,600 feet (790 m) above sea level and it lies between Martin Stadium and the Pullman–Moscow Regional Airport.

Palouse Ridge replaced a sub-standard nine-hole "WSU Golf Course" that opened in 1925, and was mostly an unimproved recreational track. It had dual tees, but measured under 5,800 yards (5,300 m) for par 72, with a course rating of 65.4 and a slope of 110. The first and ninth holes originally extended west to Stadium Way, now a parking lot, and later began on the east side of Bailey–Brayton Field, in the area now occupied by tennis courts. (Replacement holes were constructed on the east end of the layout, in the area now occupied by the 18th (reversed) and 9th holes.)

Long targeted for an upgrade, the WSU course closed in 2006 and was plowed under for the $12.3 million redesign project, constructed on part of the same site and adjacent land.

The 18-hole Palouse Ridge course opened in 2008 on August 29, and intends to improve the school's golf teams, provide a laboratory for students in turf grass courses, and give boosters and alumni an additional reason to visit campus. The course hosted NCAA golf with Pac-12 women's championship in 2012, the NCAA men's west regional in 2013, and the Pac-12 men's championship in 2015.

Palouse Ridge is an upgraded complement to the area's mainstay University of Idaho Golf Course, eight miles (13 km) east in Moscow, which opened in 1937 and added its second nine in 1970. The city of Pullman had attempted to construct an 18-hole golf course in the early 1990s at the northwest part of the city, near the high school. After some local opposition, it was put before voters in November 1994, and failed.

== Scorecard ==
Palouse Ridge Golf Club
Tee	Rating/Slope	1	2	3	4	5	6	7	8	9	Out	10	11	12	13	14	15	16	17	18	In	Total
SI	Men's	3	17	5	9	1	7	15	11	13		8	10	4	2	14	18	16	12	6
Crimson	75.4 / 140	463	379	484	190	589	253	489	447	540	3834	626	175	455	232	401	369	138	527	551	3474	7308
Blue	72.8 / 135	407	369	440	158	552	217	426	382	483	3434	566	156	426	217	401	345	119	508	551	3289	6723
Par		4	4	4	3	5	3	4	4	5	36	5	3	4	3	4	4	3	5	5	36	72
Gray	M:70.0/127 W:76.0/138	379	339	414	158	530	184	359	339	476	3178	527	133	387	179	376	307	119	475	491	2994	6172
SI	Women's	5	9	3	17	1	15	13	11	7		4	12	8	16	10	14	18	2	6
Black	72.6 / 133	353	328	389	124	510	146	316	292	411	2869	499	114	348	154	292	271	102	451	452	2683	5552
Green	70.0 / 127	346	318	362	118	453	146	260	271	370	2644	473	94	278	136	285	271	96	434	395	2462	5106

== Video ==
- YouTube – WSU's Palouse Ridge Golf Club (2013)
