= Stephen Zinser =

- Born: Stephen Martin Zinser; July 1957 (age 69); United States
- Education: Cornell University
- Occupation: Hedge fund manager

Stephen Martin Zinser (born July 1957) is an American-born, London-based hedge fund manager.

== Early life ==
Stephen Martin Zinser was born in July 1957 in the United States. He graduated from Cornell University.

== Career ==
Zinser worked for Chase Manhattan Bank from 1979 to 1992. He worked in the London headquarters of Merrill Lynch from 1993 to 1999.

In February 1999, Zinser co-founded European Credit Management, an asset management firm based in London, with Steven Blakey and Stephen Rumsey. He served as its Chief Executive Officer and Co-Chief Investment Officer. By 2007, the firm had €22 billion of assets under management, when a majority stake was acquired by Wachovia. The firm was fully owned by Wells Fargo prior to being spun off in 2021 to Allspring Global Investments.

In 2015, Zinser founded Roxbury Asset Management, a London-based investment manager which acts principally as a family office for Zinser. He serves as its Chief Executive Officer.

== Philanthropy ==
Zinser currently acts as a Trustee and Director for the Institute for Strategic Dialogue. Zinser also Chairs the Investment Committee for The Founders Pledge. He served on the board of GAVI and Chaired the Investment Committee from 2014 to June 2021. He continues to act as advisor to the Investment Committee. He also serves on the development board of Gonville and Caius College, Cambridge.

== Personal life ==
Zinser resides in London, U.K. According to the Sunday Times Rich List, he is worth an estimated £172 million in 2016.
