= University of Idaho =

Public university in Moscow, Idaho, US

- Motto: "A Legacy of Leading"
- Type: Public land-grant research university
- Established: January 30, 1889; 137 years ago
- Parent institution: Idaho State Board of Education
- Accreditation: NWCCU
- Academic affiliations: Space-grant
- Endowment: $474 million (2025)
- President: C. Scott Green
- Students: 12,275 (fall 2026)
- Undergraduates: 10,362 (fall 2025)
- Postgraduates: 2,021 (fall 2025)
- Location: Moscow, Idaho, United States; 46.726°N 117.011°W
- Campus: 1,585 acres (6.4 km^{2}); Distant town
- Other campuses: Boise; Coeur d'Alene; Idaho Falls; Post Falls; Twin Falls
- Newspaper: The Argonaut
- Colors: Silver and vandal gold
- Nickname: Vandals
- Sporting affiliations: NCAA Division I FCS – Big Sky
- Mascot: Joe Vandal
- Website: www.uidaho.edu

The University of Idaho (U of I, or UIdaho) is a public land-grant research university in Moscow, Idaho, United States. Established 137 years ago in 1889 and opened three years later, it was the state's sole university for 71 years, until 1963.

The university comprises ten undergraduate, graduate, and professional schools. It enrolls approximately 12,000 students across its campuses, with 11,000 on the Moscow campus. The university is classified among "R1: Very High Spending and Doctorate Production".

Located on the rural Palouse, the university is represented in intercollegiate athletics by the Idaho Vandals, who compete in NCAA Division I, primarily in the Big Sky Conference. In addition to the main campus in Moscow, the U of I has branch campuses in Coeur d'Alene, Boise, and Idaho Falls; it also operates a research park in Post Falls, and dozens of extension offices statewide.

== History ==
On January 30, 1889, Governor Edward Stevenson of the Idaho Territory signed the territorial legislature's Council Bill No. 20, which officially established the UI as the upcoming state's land-grant institution. Nearly four years later, the university opened for classes on October 3, 1892. The first four degrees were conferred in 1896, on Stella Maude Allen, Florence May Corbett, Charles Luther Kirtley, and Arthur Prentis Adair.

The choice of location for the University of Idaho was an "Olive Branch of Peace" by Gov. Stevenson for his actions in stymying the nearly successful effort to detach the north Idaho Panhandle and join the state of Washington.

The campus grew slowly over its first two decades. On March 30, 1906, fire destroyed the original Administration Building; its cause was never determined, and the building's library, scientific collections, and equipment were almost entirely lost. Its replacement, in Collegiate Gothic style, opened its main wing in 1909. Professional programs were added in the same period: the College of Law was established in 1909, the College of Engineering was formally created by the Board of Regents in 1911 after being organized with the College of Mines in 1907, and forestry, first taught as a department in 1909, became a separate school in 1917.

World War II reshaped the university. A campus building completed in 1942 served as a training center for naval radio operators, and varsity football was suspended for the 1943 and 1944 seasons. In the early morning of October 19, 1956, an arson fire set in a Gault Hall lounge spread up a stairwell and killed three students.

Enrollment expanded sharply in the postwar decades, reaching 8,698 by the fall of 1979. The $51 million, 4,000-seat Idaho Central Credit Union Arena opened in 2021 as the home of Vandals basketball, and the university reported $151.5 million in annual research expenditures for fiscal year 2025.

On November 13, 2022, four students were stabbed to death in a house near campus in the 2022 University of Idaho killings; Bryan Kohberger pleaded guilty in July 2025 and was sentenced to life in prison without parole. In May 2023 the university disclosed a $550 million bid to acquire the for-profit University of Phoenix through a nonprofit it had created, Four Three Education, prompting Attorney General Raúl Labrador to sue the State Board of Education over closed-door discussions of the proposal. The university and Phoenix broke off talks in June 2025, and the State Board terminated the purchase agreement at the university's request. Fall 2026 enrollment was 12,275, down 0.9 percent from the year before.

== Campus ==
According to the U of I Facts Books, the Moscow campus, abutting the Washington state line, is 1,585 acres (2.5 mi^{2}; 6.4 km^{2}), including 253 buildings with a replacement value of $812 million. It has 49 acres (20 ha) of parking lots, 1.2 miles (2 km) of bike paths, 22 computer labs, an 18-hole golf course on 150 acres (61 ha), 80 acres (32 ha) of arboreta, and 860 acres (1.3 mi^{2}; 3.5 km^{2}) of farms.

=== Administration Building ===
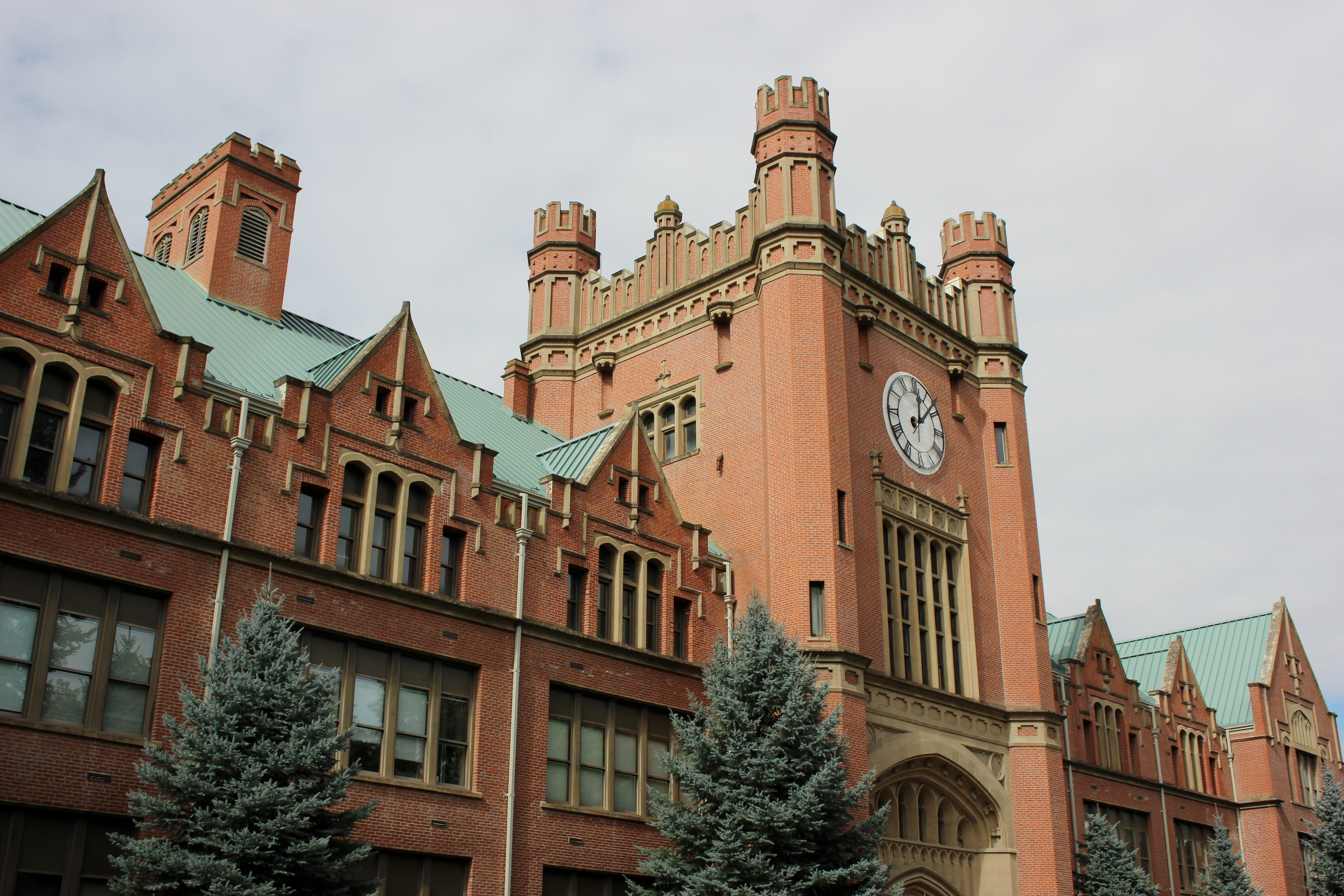
Administration Building (1909) in 2017

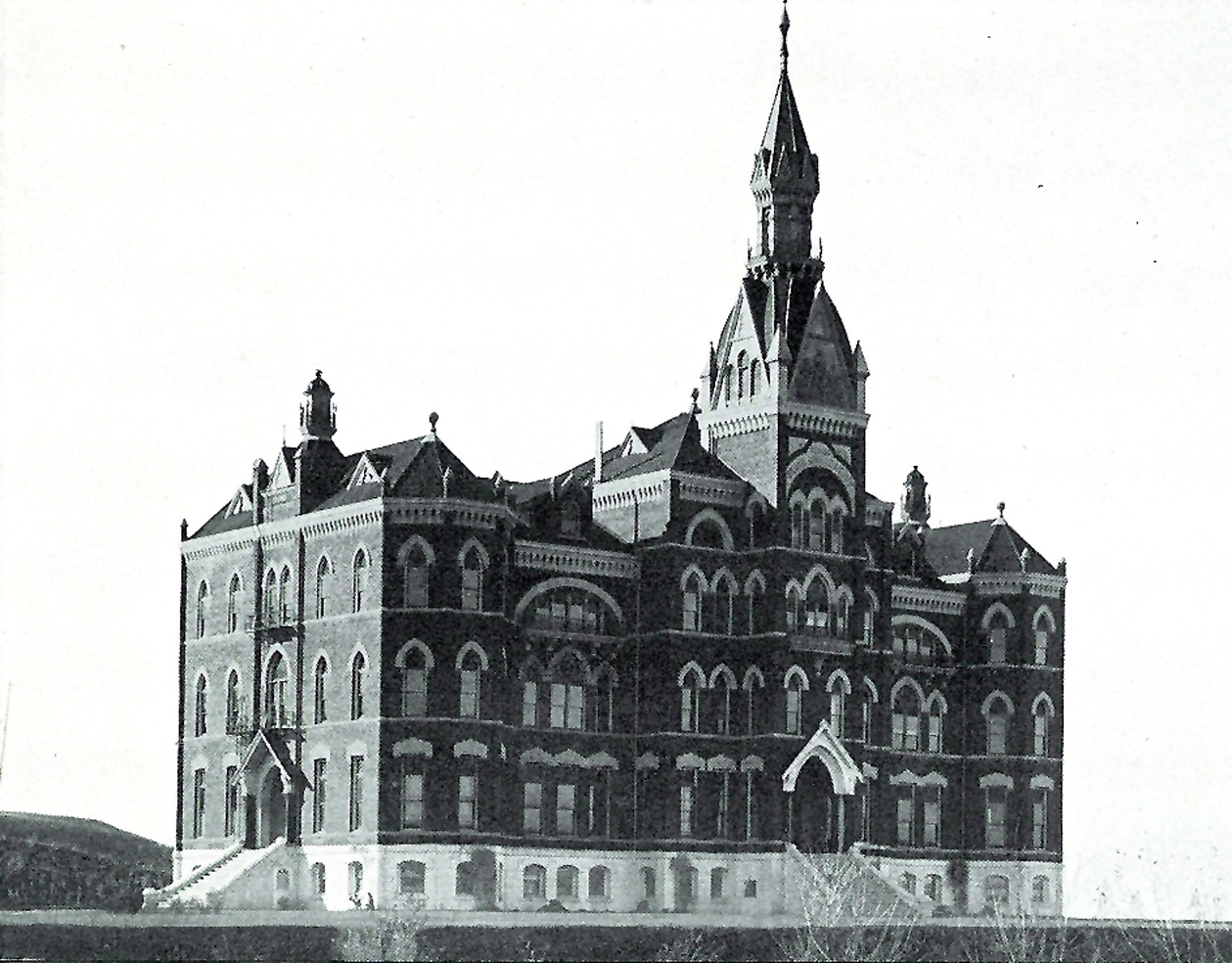
The original Administration Building (1899) was destroyed by fire in 1906. It was replaced in 1909 by the existing brick Collegiate Gothic structure.

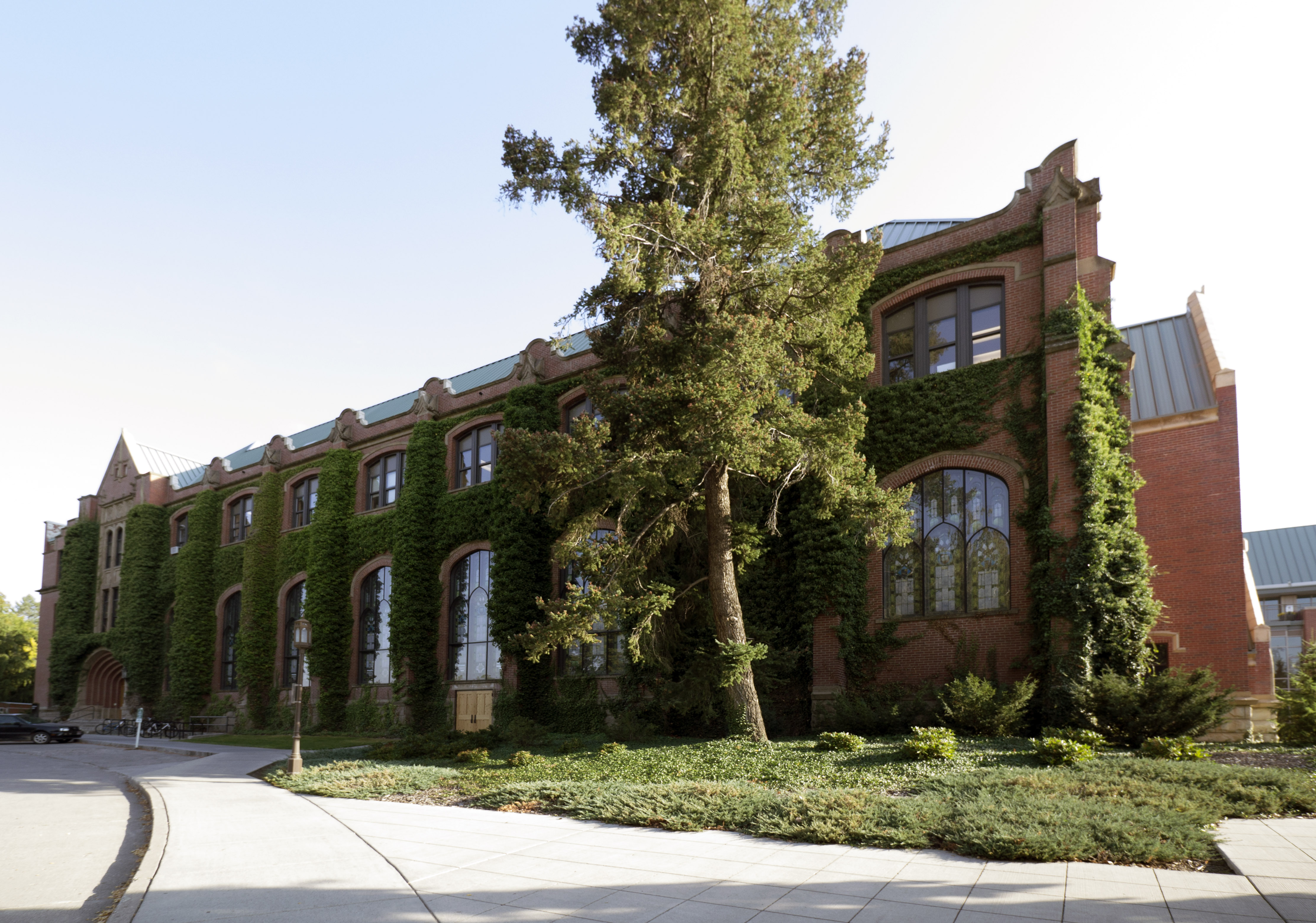
Administration Building's north wing (1912)

The Administration Building, with its eighty-foot (24 m) clock tower and Collegiate Gothic-style structure, was built from 1907 to 1909 and has become an icon of the university. The building holds classrooms, an auditorium, and administrative offices, including the offices of the President and Provost. Multiple expansions were made, with the north wing added in 1912, the eastern portion of the south wing in 1916 (extended west in 1936 for the library), and the functional annex in 1950, incorporated into the Albertson addition of 2002. The U of I library was housed in the Administration Building until 1957, when the Library building opened, constructed on the former site of tennis courts. The College of Law occupied the south wing until its building (Menard) opened in 1973.

The original Administration Building, with a single tall spire reaching to 163 feet (50 m), was constructed through the decade of the 1890s and ultimately finished in 1899. It burned in 1906. In the meantime, classes were held at various sites in Moscow. The new Administration Building was designed by John E. Tourtellotte, who modeled the new structure after Hampton Court Palace in England.

The 1909 Administration Building was added to the National Register of Historic Places in 1978.

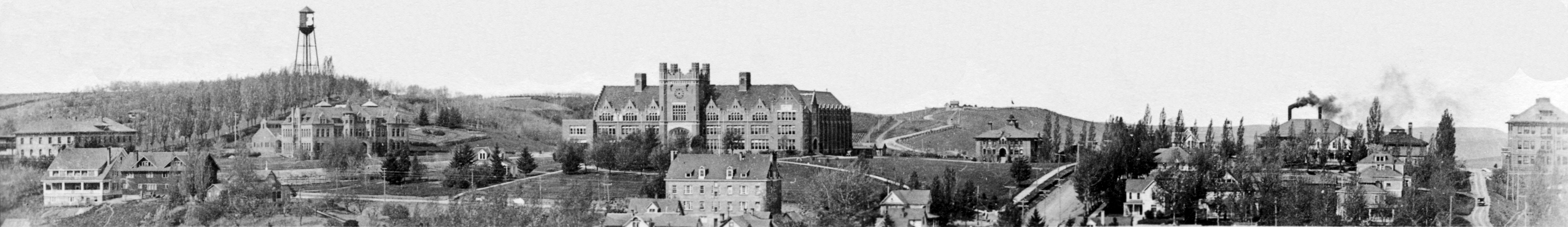
Campus, c. 1915

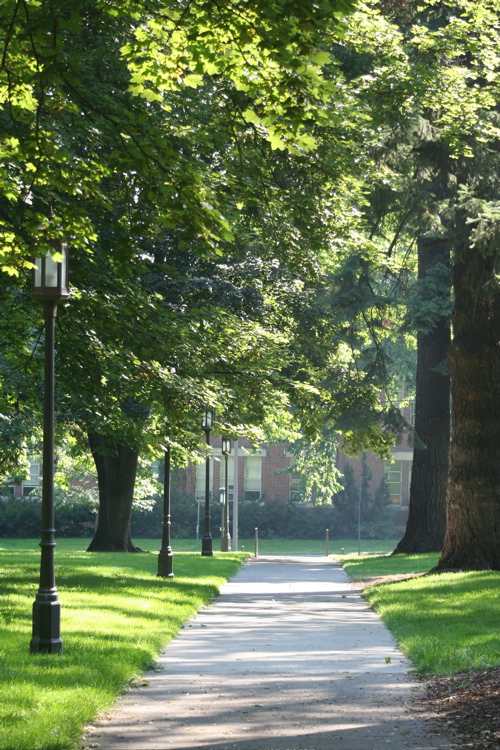
Hello Walk

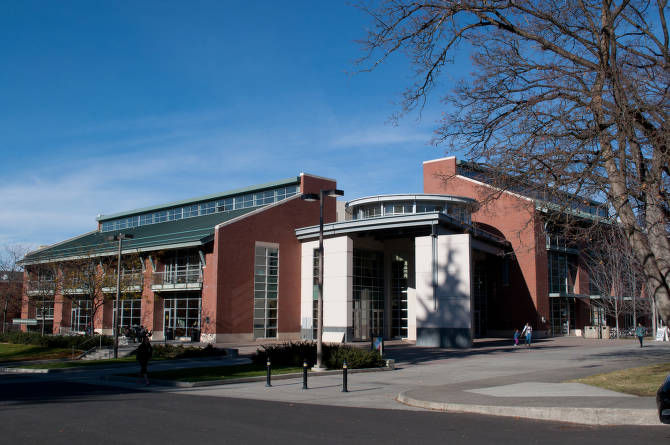
Idaho Student Union Building (2000)

=== Hello Walk ===
The "Hello Walk" is one of the best-known and traveled pathways on the Idaho campus. It includes monuments such as Presidential Grove, where historical figures, such as Teddy Roosevelt, planted trees; the Spanish–American War memorial statue who had his hands cut off but was reconstructed by the handless sculptor Bud Washburn; and Administration Lawn that was designed by the Olmsted Brothers.

=== Idaho Student Union Building ===
The Idaho Student Union Building (ISUB), completed in 2000 as the Commons, is the heart of campus and contains a food court, copy center, bagel and coffee shop (Einstein's Bagels), credit union, and convenience store. Additionally, there is study space, wireless internet, laptop checkout, and many student services such as the offices of the Associated Students of the University of Idaho (ASUI), Academics Assistance, the University of Idaho Writing Center, and Student Support. With the completion of the Teaching and Learning Center (TLC) at the beginning of the fall semester of 2005, the second phase, the Idaho Student Union Building gained classrooms and completed the vision of a common area where students could learn, study, relax, and get university services all in one place.

=== Bruce M. Pitman Center ===
The Bruce M. Pitman Center is located on the east end of campus on Deakin Street. The building houses the university's financial aid, admissions, new student services, registrar and Graduate & Professional Student Association (GPSA) offices. For students, the Pitman Center also features meeting rooms, a computer lab, wireless access, borrowable laptops and a movie theater. The building began as a motel, the Blue Bucket Inn, which UI purchased in 1936 and later expanded. The VandalStore, built in 1989 on a former parking lot, is located directly across the street to the east; it was previously adjacent to the south.

UI student-run media offices are also present on the third floor of the Pitman Center: The Argonaut, a newspaper; KUOI-FM, a radio station; student media advertising; and Blot, a magazine.

In October 2014, the University of Idaho announced the renaming of the Student Union Building as Bruce M. Pitman Center in honor of the retiring dean of students and vice provost for student affairs, who had served the campus community for more than 41 years. The name change took effect on January 1, 2015.

=== P1FCU Kibbie Dome ===
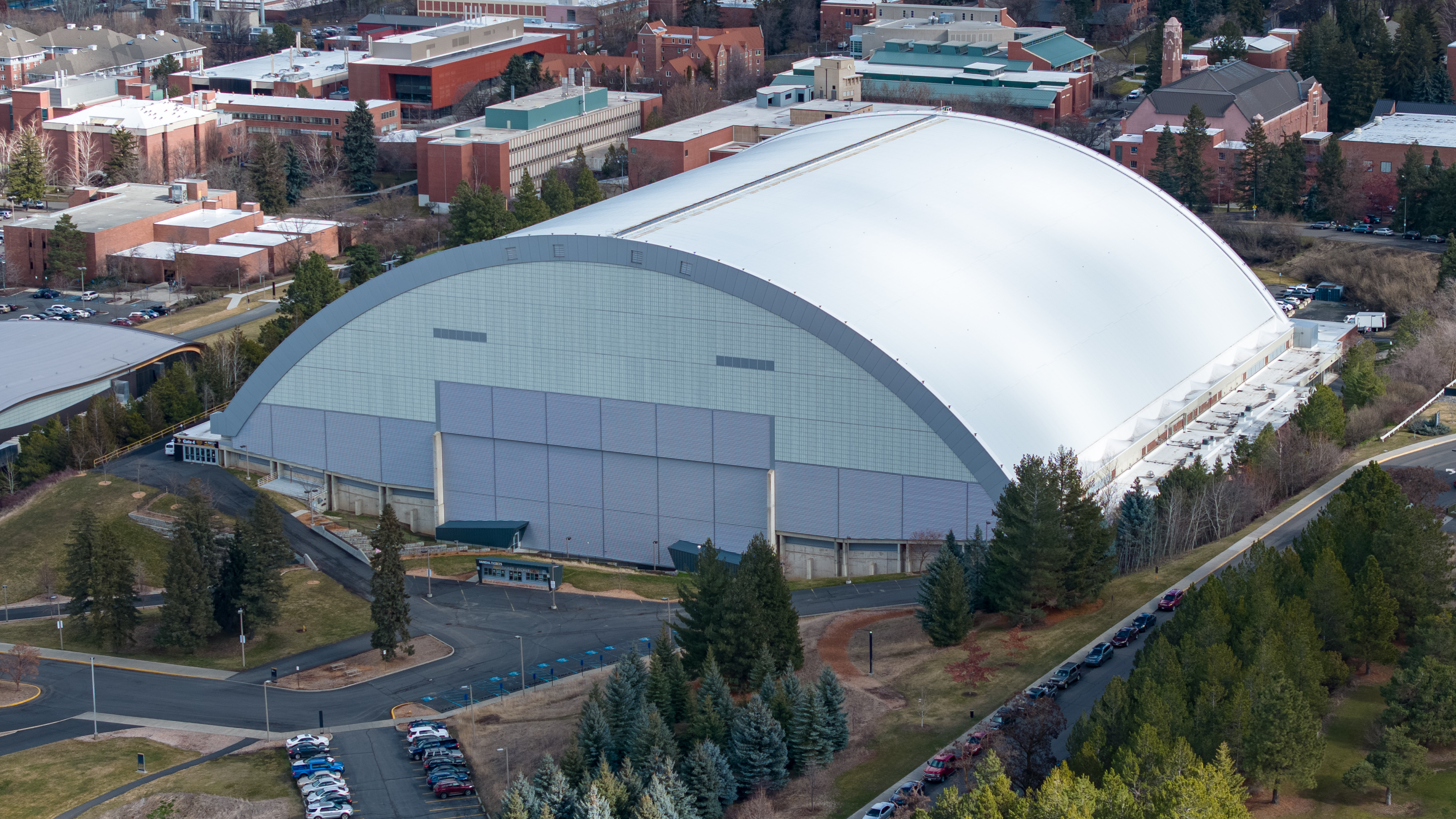
Kibbie Dome in February 2024

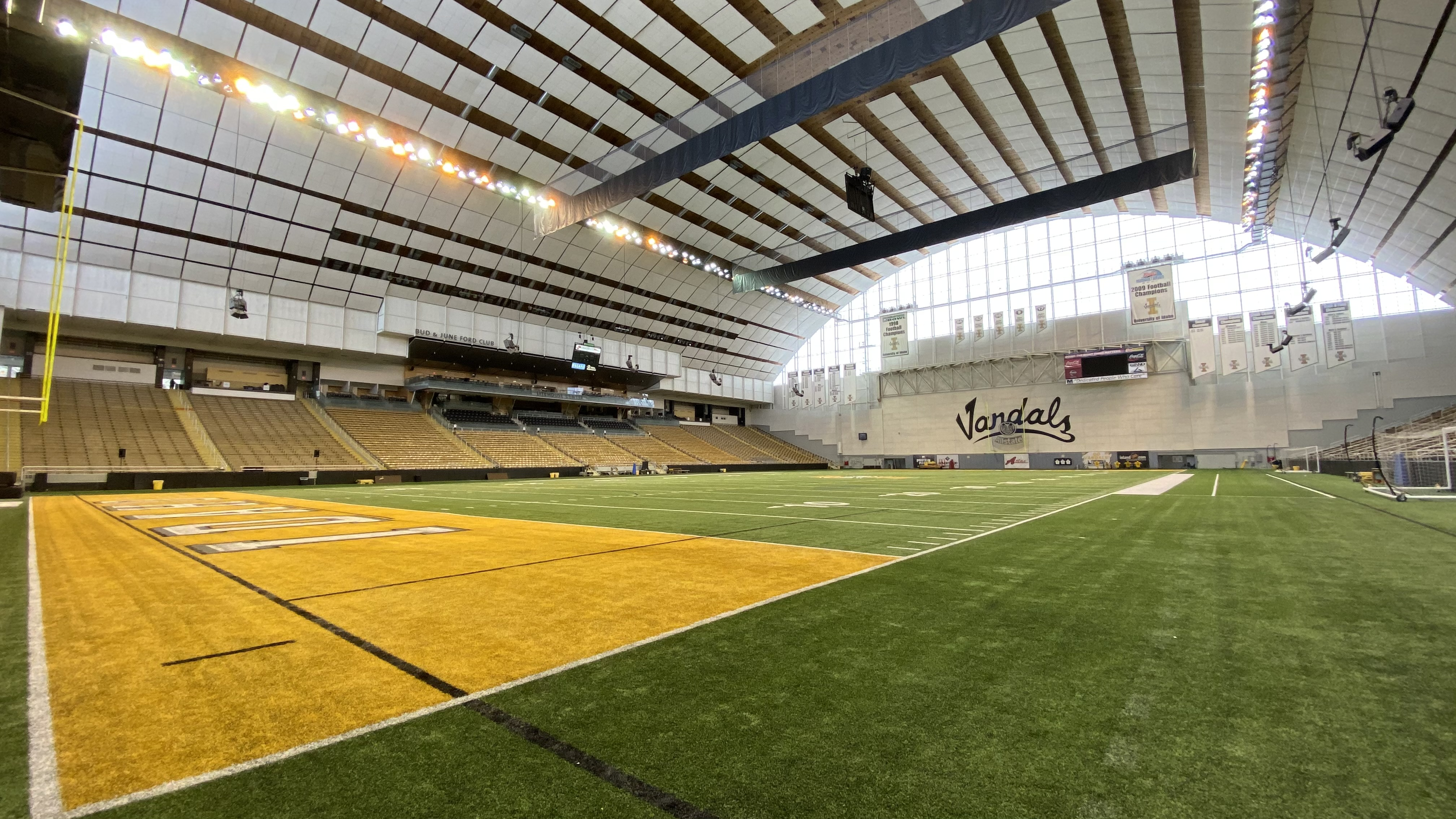
Kibbie Dome interior, 2020

UI's multi-purpose "Kibbie Dome" is the primary home to Vandal athletics; it is the venue for football, soccer, tennis, and indoor track & field. Its Trus-Dek roof system, constructed in 1975, uses natural wood arches to span 400 feet (122 m) at a height of 150 feet (46 m) over the field's hashmarks. Previously on this site was Neale Stadium, which opened in 1937 as an earthen horseshoe with wooden sideline grandstands. It was named the Kibbie ASUI Activity Center, later changed to ASUI Kibbie Dome.

Tartan Turf, similar to AstroTurf, was installed in 1972 with the roll-up mechanism; the arched roof and vertical end walls were completed in time for the 1975 home opener on September 27, enclosing the stadium to become the Kibbie Dome. The seating capacity is 16,000 for football games, 7,000 for basketball games (in a configuration known as the "Cowan Spectrum" since 2001), and 7,500 for concerts.

In 2023 it was renamed "P1FCU Kibbie Dome" after Potlach First Financial Credit Union bought the naming rights for $10 million.

=== Idaho Central Credit Union Arena ===
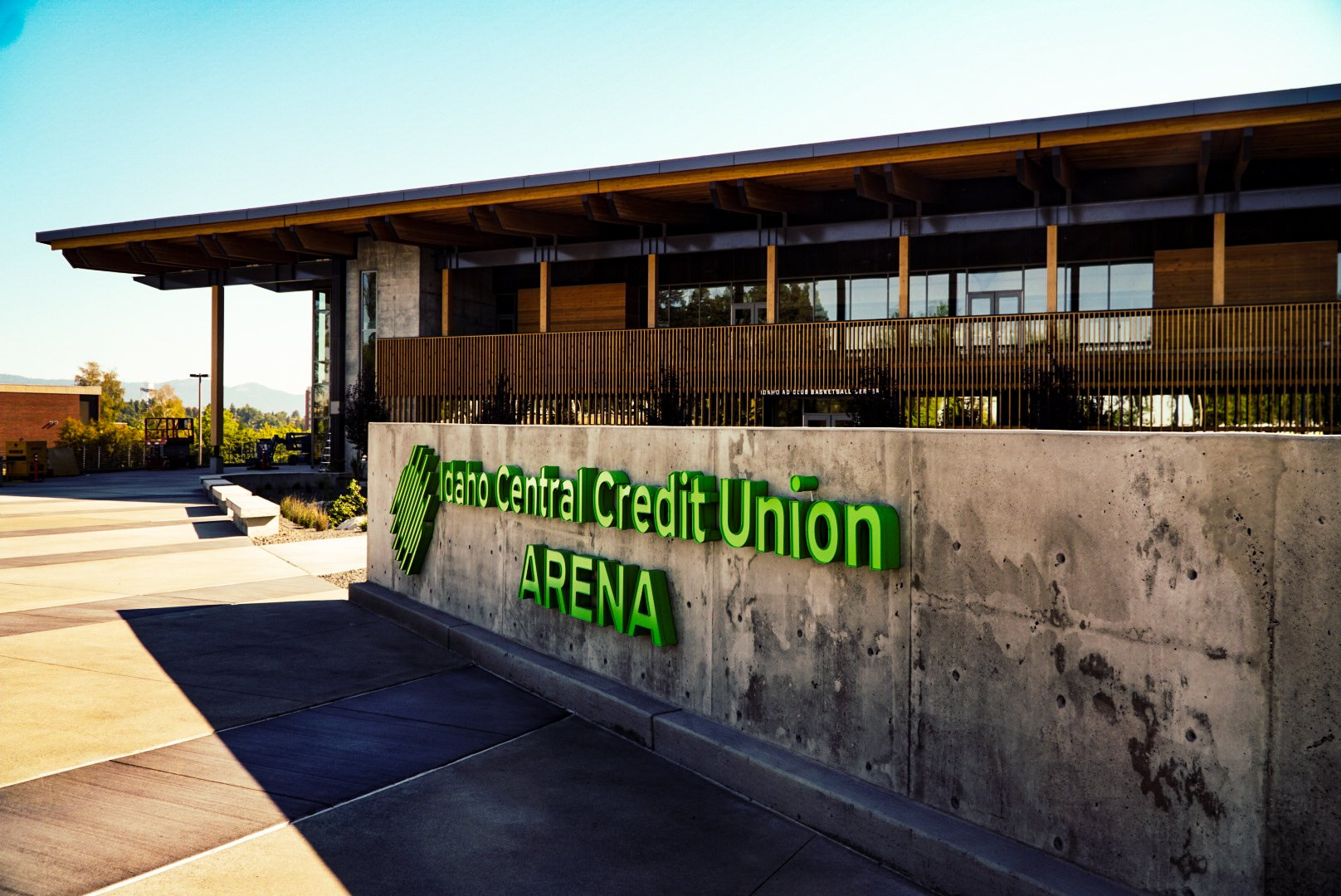
ICCU Arena exterior (2021)

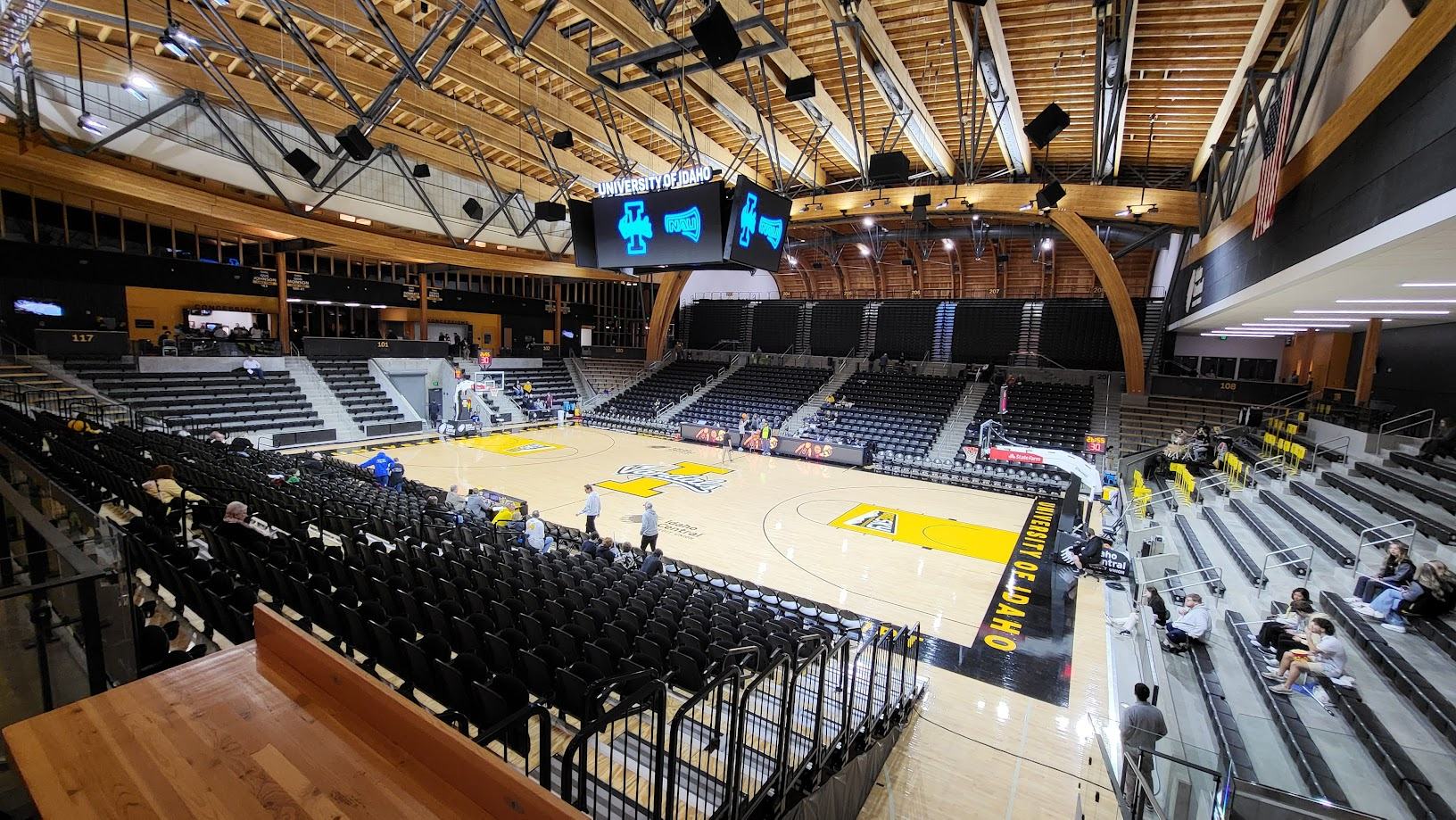
ICCU Arena in 2024

Idaho Central Credit Union Arena (ICCU Arena), located immediately to the north of the Kibbie Dome, became the new home of Vandals men's and women's basketball for the 2021–22 season. The university had attempted to build a new arena to replace Memorial Gym for over 50 years, but nothing came of the plans until 2018, when a $10 million naming gift from Idaho Central Credit Union encouraged the administration to go forward with construction. Ground was broken the following year. The 4,200-seat facility, costing about $51 million, is primarily made from engineered wood, with the superstructure consisting mainly of over 850 Douglas fir beams prepared from trees logged at the university's experimental forest. Several major forest products companies assisted in the construction process. The arena opened for a media tour on September 29, 2021, with the basketball teams using the main arena and an included practice court during preseason practice. The first event in the new arena was a men's basketball exhibition against NAIA member Evergreen State on October 29. The first regular-season game was a men's game against Long Beach State on November 10. This game served as a homecoming for Beach head coach Dan Monson, son of former longtime Vandals head coach Don Monson and himself a former Vandals football player.

=== Golf course ===
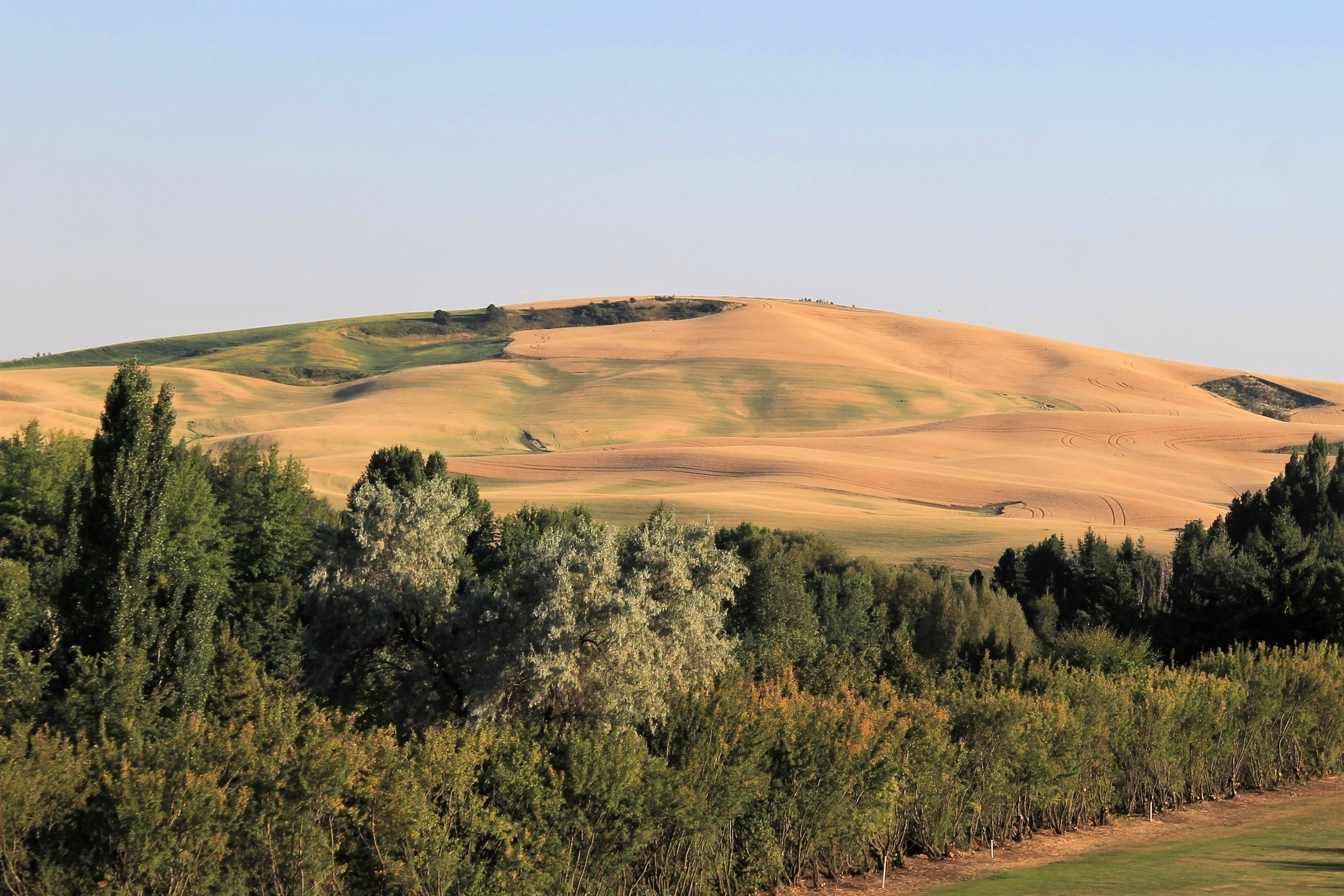
Palouse landscape seen from University of Idaho Golf Course

The UI Golf Course was established in 1933 on the southwest edge of campus and opened as nine holes in 1937. It was expanded to 18 holes in 1970 and its current clubhouse was built in 1969. Due to its demanding rolling terrain and southwesterly summer winds, the par-72 course's moderate length of 6,637 yards (6,069 m) from the back tees yields a challenging slope of 135 with a scratch rating of 72.4.

=== Arboretum and botanical garden ===
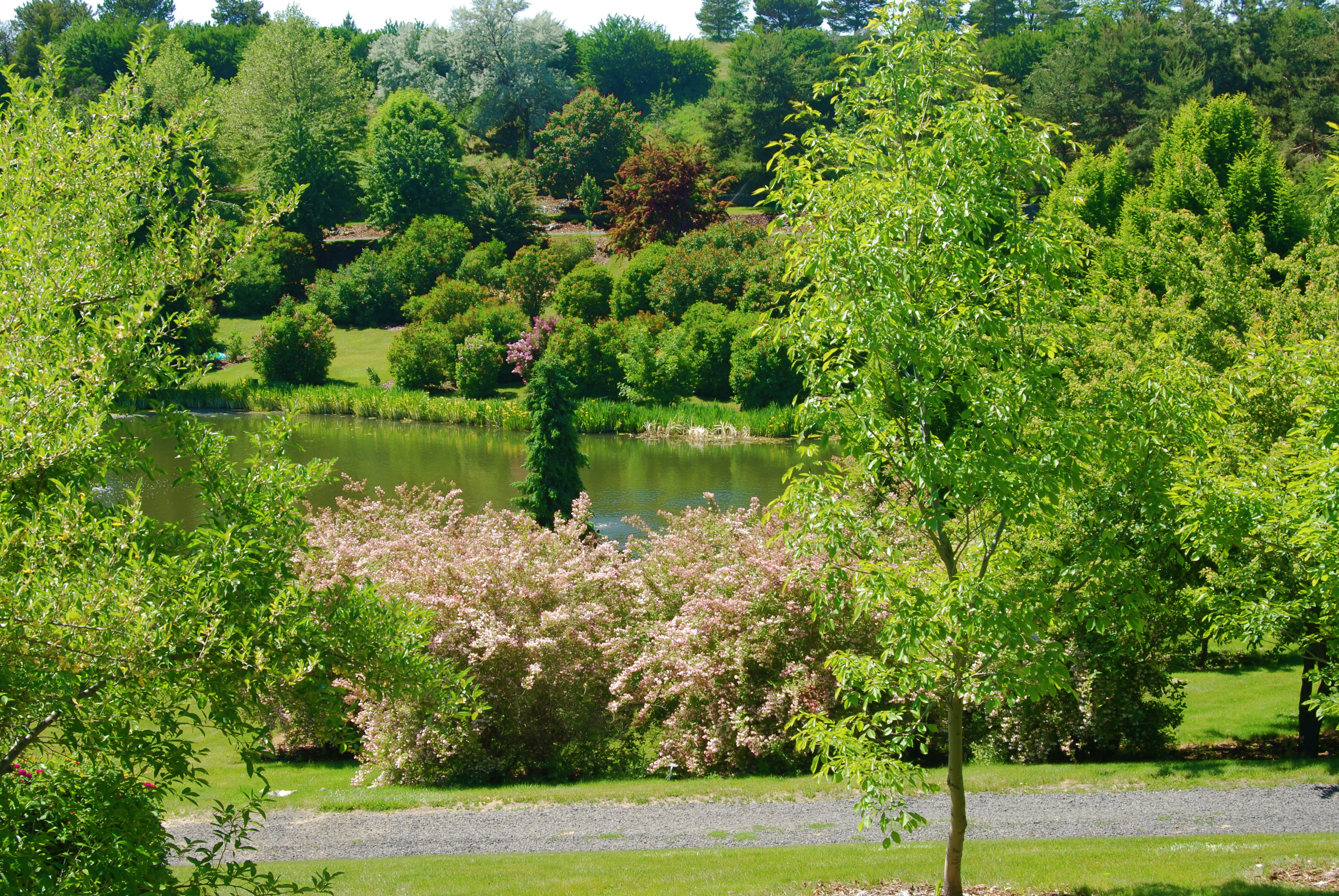
View of Arboretum and Botanical Garden trail and pond

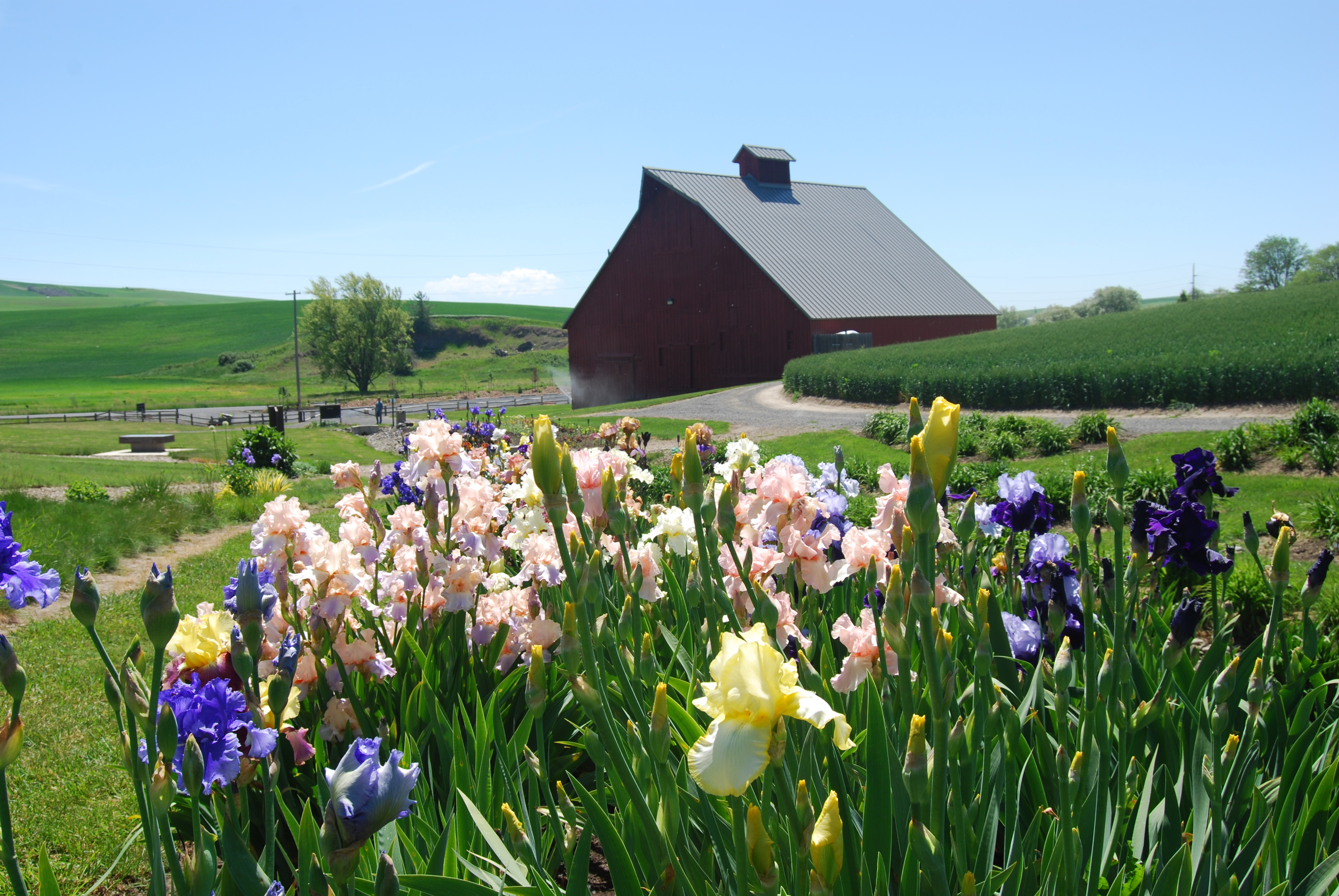
View of southern section of Arboretum with view of "Red Barn"

Referred to as "Tree City" or "The Arb" by U of I students, the University of Idaho Arboretum and Botanical Garden is a 65-acre (26 ha) site adjacent to the golf course which features display gardens, ponds, and a variety of trees and plants from Asia, Europe, and North America.

The original Shattuck Arboretum was conceived in 1910 by Charles H. Shattuck, the head of the forestry department. His efforts gradually turned a treeless slope southwest of the Administration Building into a dense forest grove. The arboretum was named for Shattuck in 1933, two years after his death. Until the late 1960s, this area provided the background for left & center field of the MacLean field, whose infield was displaced by the construction of the new College of Education buildings, which were completed in 1968.

The newer portion of the arboretum complex is south of the Shattuck area, in the valley below the president's residence (1967), along the eastern edge of the University of Idaho Golf Course.

=== Library ===
The U of I Library is the state's largest library, with more than 1.4 million books, periodicals, government documents, maps, video recordings, and special collections. The Library's Special Collections and Archives houses a collection of first edition works by Sir Walter Scott, as well as more than 1200 texts by and about the author. The Library also has materials by many famous Idahoans, including Ezra Pound, Vardis Fisher, Frank Bruce Robinson, and Carol Ryrie Brink of Moscow. Digitized historic photographs from the University of Idaho campus and the state of Idaho, yearbooks, and the student newspaper the Argonaut, can be found on the Library's Digital Initiatives website.

Directly north of the Memorial Gymnasium and built on the former site of tennis courts, the library opened in 1957, relocating from the south wing of the Administration Building. The U of I post office station was formerly housed in its lower northwest corner; it was moved to the new U of I bookstore in 1990. The U of I Library was expanded by 50% in 1993 and rededicated in 1994. The first floor underwent major renovation during the 2016 academic year to up-date collaborative spaces and technology.

=== Memorial Gymnasium ===
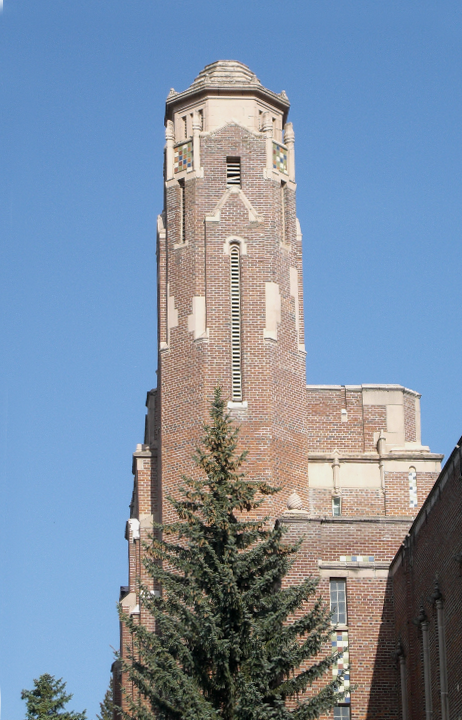
Memorial Gym Tower (1928)

The Tudor Gothic-style Memorial Gymnasium is another U of I icon, known for its whimsical athletic gargoyles perched along the brick building's ledges. The multi-purpose "Mem Gym" has a modest seating capacity of only 1,500. Opened in 1928 to honor the Idaho citizens who died in World War I (1917–18) and Spanish–American War (1898), the heavily buttressed structure was designed by the chairman of the university's architecture department, David C. Lang.

Memorial Gym was the primary venue for men's basketball until January 1976, following the enclosure of the Kibbie Dome the previous fall. The women's team hosted its home games in the gym until 2001, when the Cowan Spectrum (inside the Kibbie Dome) was completed. The gym is still in active use today as the home court for the women's volleyball team, and was also used for early-season basketball games before the opening of ICCU Arena. It is also used extensively for intramurals and open recreation, as well as for ROTC.

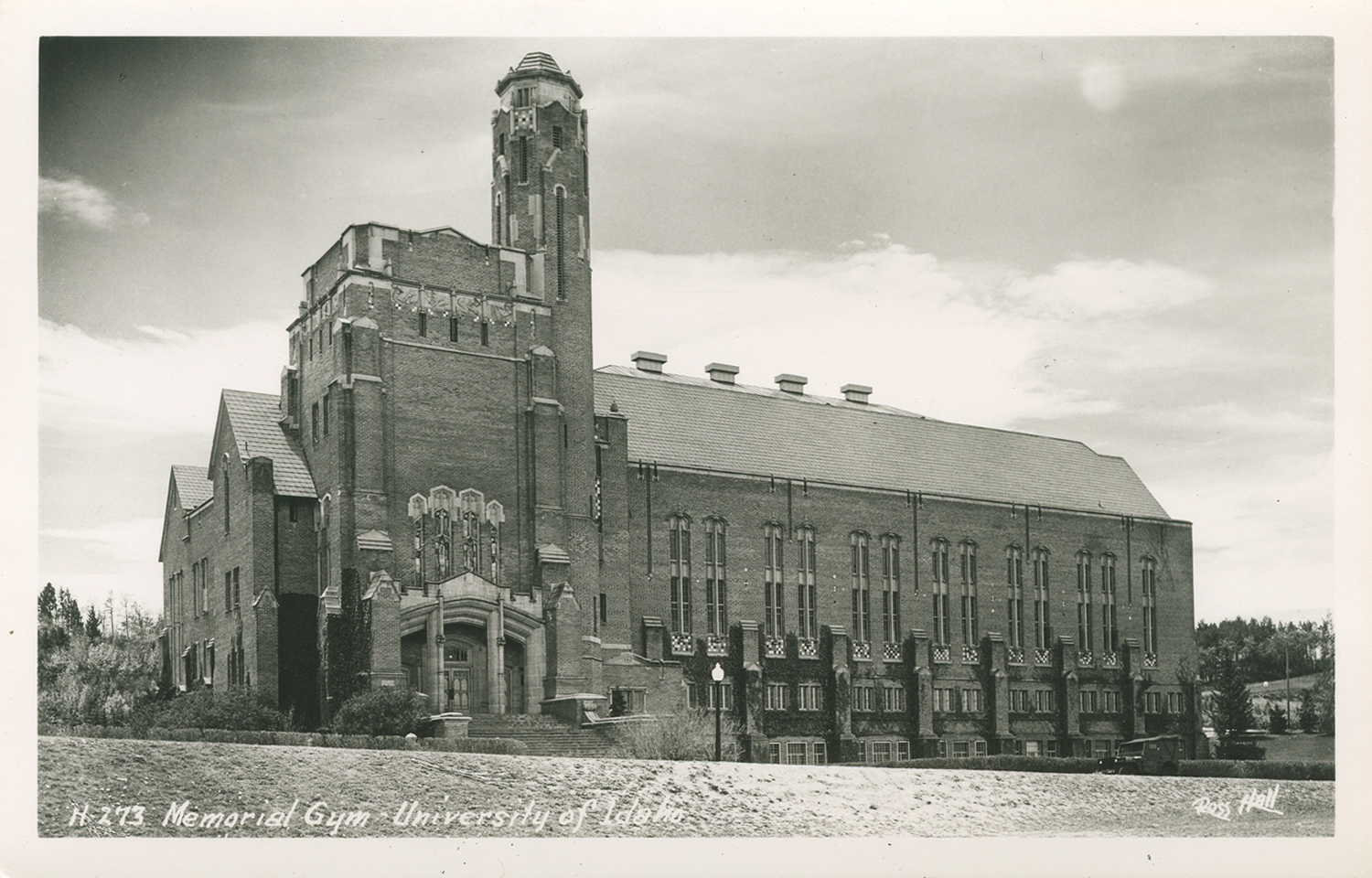
Memorial Gym exterior in the 1940s

The MacLean baseball field was located directly south of the Memorial Gym, until its infield was displaced by the construction of the College of Education building in 1967. The catcher and batter faced southwest (towards the pitcher's mound); the right field line was just south of the gym, running east–west. The background of left and center field was the Shattuck Arboretum. The new baseball field (Guy Wicks Field) was relocated northwest, to the vast intramural fields near the Moscow-Pullman Highway, northwest of the Wallace Complex dormitories. The batter and catcher now faced southeast, toward campus, an unorthodox configuration resulting in a difficult sun field for the left side of the defense (the recommended alignment is east-northeast). Due to budget constraints, varsity baseball was dropped following the 1980 season, but continued for a while as a club sport. MacLean was also the venue for football until the opening of Neale Stadium in 1937.

The swim center and physical education building (formerly known as the "Women's Gym"), which both opened in 1970, are adjacent to the south side of the gym. Before the swim center was opened, the Mem Gym had a narrow swimming pool in its basement.

In 1977, the Memorial Gymnasium was added to the National Register of Historic Places after only 49 years.

=== Under the elms ===
Rare Camperdown elms line the walkway between the Music building, Nichols Building (home to Family and Consumer Sciences) and Administration Building. These "upside-down" trees have been on campus for over 80 years and are among few of their kind in the Northwest. The weeping branches and knotty trunk are formed by being grafted upwards.

=== Steam plant ===
Built in 1926, the steam plant provides heat to U of I buildings from a single location. Originally designed to burn coal, then oil, then natural gas, the plant was modified in 1986 to burn waste wood chips left over from local sawmills. The use of wood has significantly reduced the emissions of the plant, as well as cut costs to heat the campus. The plant is shut down twice a year for cleaning and maintenance. As a side benefit of the heat generation, the steam pipes are routed underneath campus walkways and provide clean (and ice free) walkways throughout the north Idaho winter.

=== University housing ===
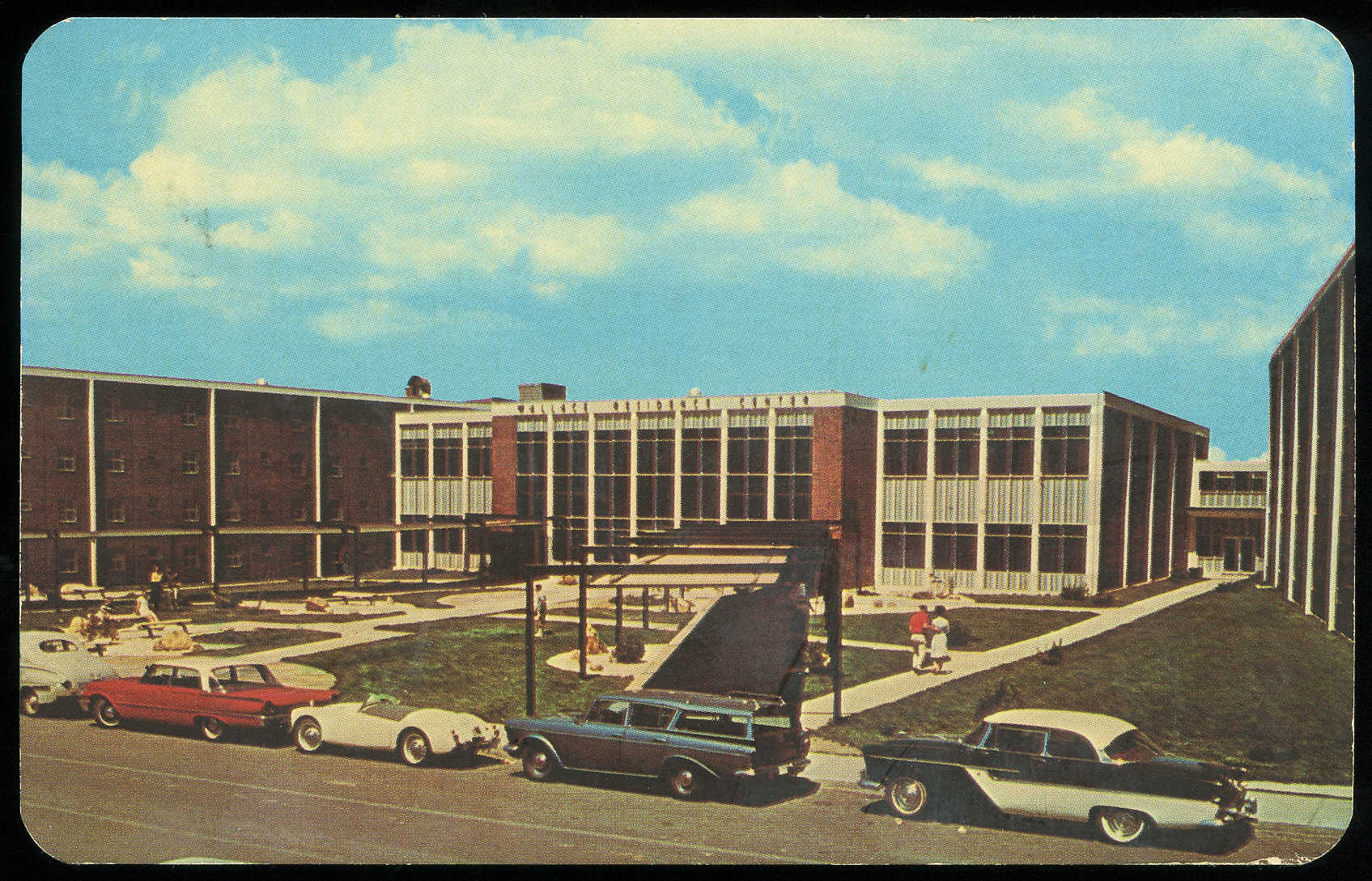
Wallace Residence Center in 1965

The University of Idaho offers various options for on-campus housing, including four residence halls (Wallace Residence Center, Theophilus Tower, McConnell Hall, Living Learning Communities) for students and Apartments (South Hill Apartments, South Hill Vista Apartments, and Elmwood Apartments) for non-traditional students or those who need special accommodations.

Usually apartments are only available to single parents, married couples (with or without children), law students, and students over 21 years old. Theophilus Tower, 3 of the 4 Wallace Residence wings, and one LLC building is only available for first-year students. Students can also live in a Fraternity or Sorority chapter on campus. Summer housing is available but choices are limited.

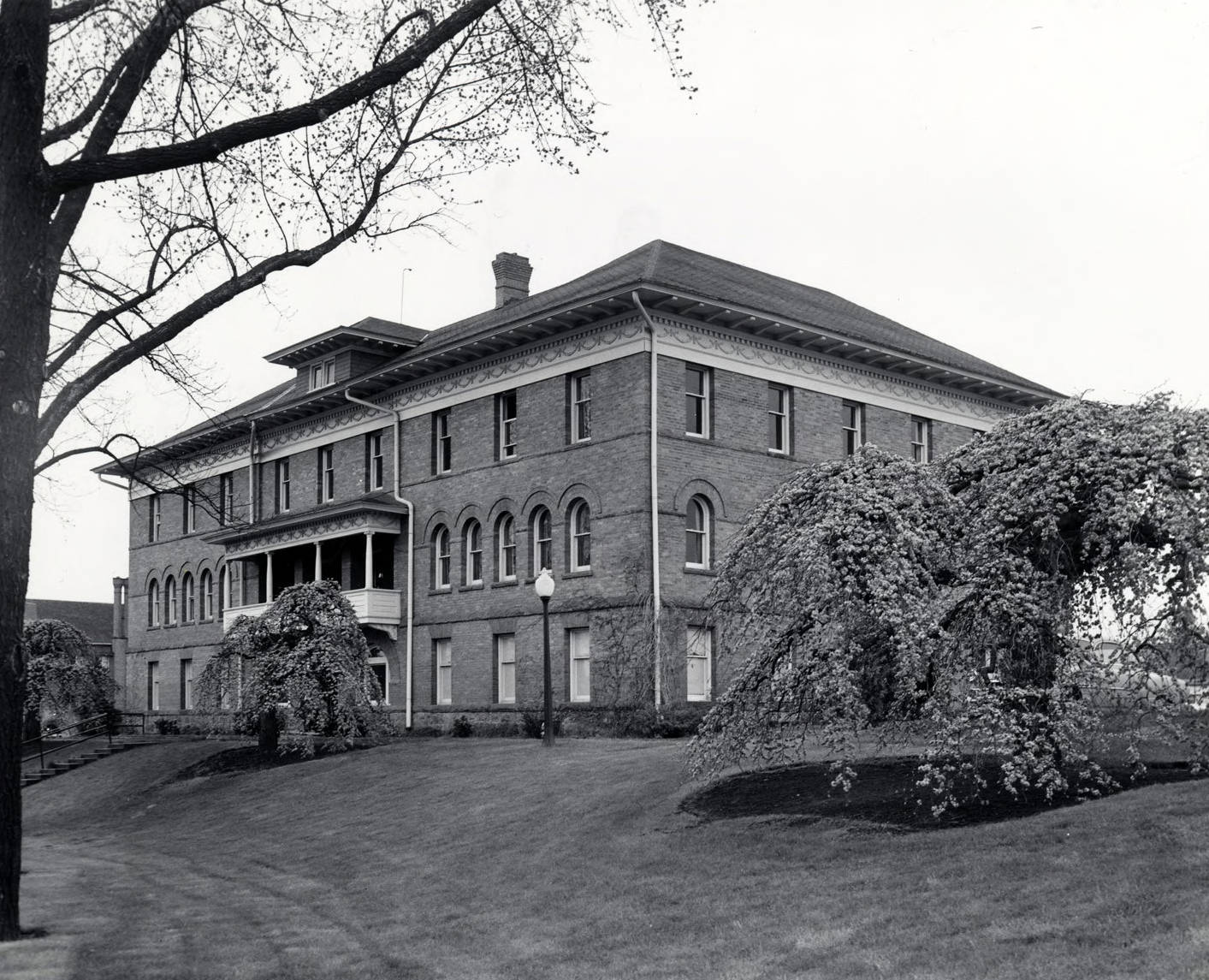
Ridenbaugh Hall in 1980

=== Ridenbaugh Hall ===
The Board of Regents authorized the construction of Ridenbaugh Hall as the first women's dormitory on campus. Completed in 1901 at a cost of $17,000, it is the oldest extant building on campus. It was designed by architect Willis A. Ritchie of Spokane, who also designed the Spokane County Courthouse. The building used stone quarried in Latah County for the exterior walls. It was also used as a space for domestic science classes until 1927 when it became a men's dormitory. The building was later used for music practice rooms and currently houses the Art and Architecture gallery.

Ridenbaugh Hall was the first U of I campus structure to be named after a person. The hall was dedicated to "the young women of Idaho" in honor of Mary E. Ridenbaugh (1857–1926) of Boise, who was vice president of the U of I Board of Regents, and served as regent from 1901 to 1907. The building was placed on the National Register of Historic Places in 1977.

== Academics ==
From 1896 through May 2011, the University of Idaho granted 80,233 bachelor's degrees, 21,734 master's degrees, 2,694 doctoral degrees, 240 honorary degrees, 1,164 specialist degrees, and 3,654 law degrees.

The university is organized into ten colleges and one school; two are exclusively for graduate students (Law & Graduate Studies):

- College of Agricultural and Life Sciences (CALS, renamed 2001, formerly Agriculture (1901))
- College of Art and Architecture (1981)
- College of Business and Economics (CBE, 1925)
- College of Education, Health and Human Sciences (EHHS, 1920)
- College of Engineering (1911)
- College of Graduate Studies (COGS)
- College of Law (1909)
- College of Letters, Arts, and Social Sciences (CLASS, 2002, formed after split of Letters and Science (1900))
- College of Natural Resources (CNR, renamed 2000, formerly Forestry, Wildlife, & Range Sciences, originally Forestry (1917))
- College of Science (2002, formed after split of Letters and Science, and dissolution of Mines and Earth Resources)
- School of Health and Medical Professions (SHAMP, 2024)

In July 2002, the College of Letters & Science was split into two separate colleges: the College of Science and the College of Letters, Arts, and Social Sciences (CLASS). Concurrently, the College of Mines and Earth Resources was discontinued; its programs were split between the College of Engineering and the new College of Science.

The College of Law opened a second campus in Boise in 2010. Initially, the Boise campus only offered third-year classes. It expanded to offer second-year classes in 2014, and as of 2017–18, law students can take their entire three-year curriculum at either location.

For the 2024–2025 academic year, the middle 50% of enrolled students scored between 1030 and 1330 on the SAT (with a 50th percentile of 1180), between 510 and 670 on the SAT Evidence-Based Reading and Writing section (50th percentile: 590), and between 520 and 660 on the SAT Math section (50th percentile: 590).

=== Reputation and rankings ===
Academic rankings

National
- Forbes: 281
- U.S. News & World Report: 179
- Washington Monthly: 83
- WSJ/College Pulse: 401-500

Global
- ARWU: 501-600
- QS: 1001-1200
- U.S. News & World Report: 1218

U.S. News & World Report ranks U of I tied for 89th among the nation's best public universities and tied for 179th among the best national universities in its 2020 report. In 2024, Washington Monthly ranked U of I 83rd among 438 national universities in the U.S. based on U of I's contribution to the public good, as measured by social mobility, research, and promoting public service. In 2025, the Carnegie Classification listed University of Idaho among "R1 Doctoral Universities – Very high research spending and doctorate production", among with other 186 universities.

The University of Idaho is included in the 2021 edition of Princeton Review's "Best 386 Colleges." The Princeton Review also ranks U-Idaho as one of the nation's top 286 environmentally responsible colleges. The university was named by the Corporation for National and Community Service to the 2010 President's Higher Education Community Service Honor Roll for exemplary service efforts—more than 3,800 students volunteered more than 150,000 hours to community and service-learning. This was the fifth consecutive year Idaho has earned this highest federal recognition for its commitment to service-learning and civic engagement.

== Student life ==
Undergraduate demographics as of fall 2023
Race and ethnicity	Total
White	74%
Hispanic	11%
International student	5%
Two or more races	4%
Asian	2%
American Indian/Alaska Native	1%
Black	1%
Unknown	1%
Economic diversity
Low-income (Note: The percentage of students who received an income-based federal Pell grant intended for low-income students.)	31%
Affluent (Note: The percentage of students who are a part of the American middle class at the bare minimum.)	69%

U of I is a rural, residential campus, with four residence hall communities to choose from on campus, as well as 27 housed fraternities and sororities. On-campus residence is currently required for freshmen, and many other upperclassmen choose to live on campus in the Greek system or the residence halls.

Apartments on campus are available for families, married couples, graduate students, law students, and non-traditional students. The "Law Cluster" is a group of apartments reserved for law students, allowing for a community close to campus for law students, facilitating study groups.

=== Student organizations ===
Many students participate in a wide variety of over 200 clubs and organizations. Clubs range from sports to faith based, and everything in between. Palousafest is a fair that brings clubs and students together, and is a way for students to find out more about how to get involved with extracurricular activities. The fair is usually the weekend just before the fall semester starts. The literary journal Fugue is published at the university.

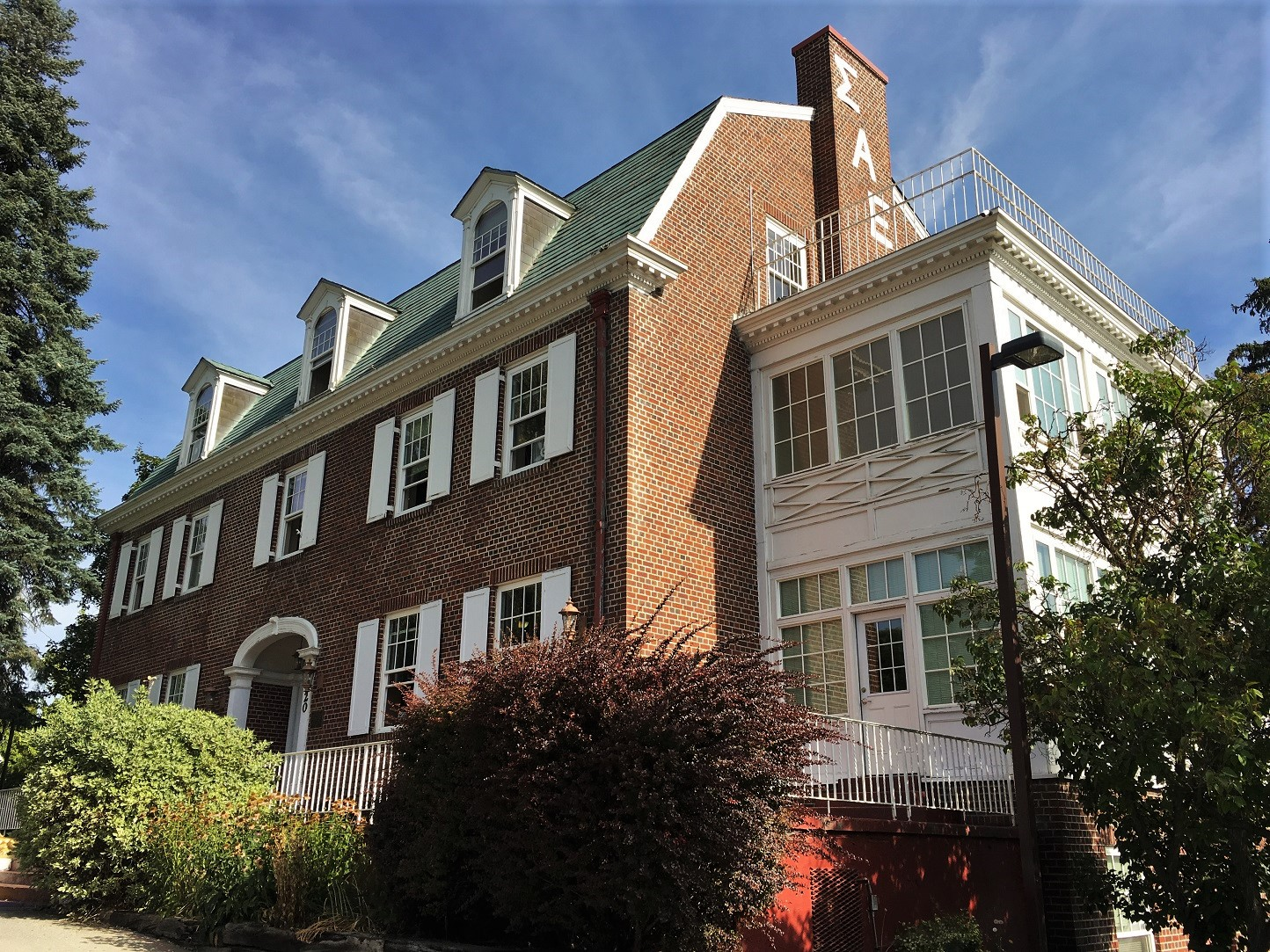
Sigma Alpha Epsilon Chapter, University of Idaho

=== Greek life ===
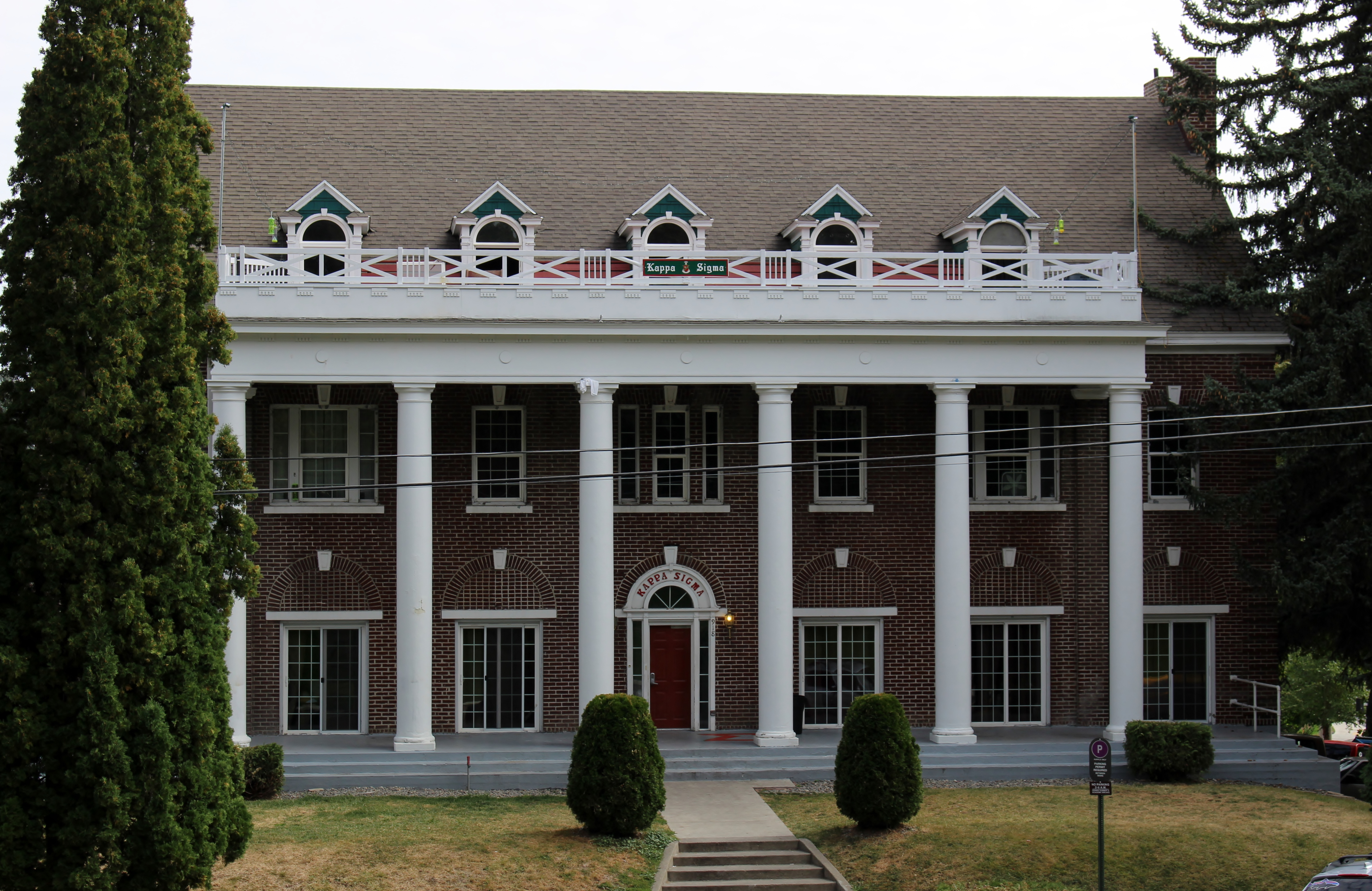
Kappa Sigma House, University of Idaho

The University of Idaho is home to more than two dozen (multicultural) Greek organizations that make up more than 20% of the student population. Over 44% of the students who live on campus are involved in Greek life.

Fraternity and Sorority Life at University of Idaho includes 35 Greek-letter organizations within Multicultural Greek Council, Interfraternity Council and Panhellenic Council. Each chapter offers a supportive community that helps students navigate the college experience together.

Interfraternity Council Recognized Chapters
Organization	Greek Letters	Date Founded	Chapter
Alpha Gamma Rho	ΑΓΡ	1992	Beta Phi
Alpha Kappa Lambda	ΑΚΛ	1968	Alpha Phi
Alpha Sigma Phi	ΑΣΦ	Colony	Kappa Tau
Beta Theta Pi	ΒΘΠ	1914	Gamma Gamma
Delta Sigma Phi	ΔΣΦ	1950	Gamma Iota
Delta Tau Delta	ΔΤΔ	1931	Delta Mu
FarmHouse	FH	1957	Idaho
Kappa Sigma	ΚΣ	1905	Gamma Theta
Lambda Chi Alpha	ΛΧΑ	1927	Epsilon Gamma
Phi Delta Theta	ΦΔΘ	1908	Idaho Alpha
Phi Gamma Delta (Fiji)	ΦΓΔ	1920	Mu Iota
Phi Kappa Tau	ΦΚΤ	1947	Beta Gamma
Pi Kappa Alpha	ΠΚΑ	1966	Zeta Mu
Pi Kappa Phi	ΠΚΦ	2016	Kappa Iota
Sigma Alpha Epsilon	ΣΑΕ	1919	Idaho Alpha
Sigma Chi	ΣΧ	1924	Gamma Eta
Sigma Nu	ΣΝ	1915	Delta Omicron
Tau Kappa Epsilon	ΤΚΕ	1927	Alpha Delta
Theta Chi	ΘΧ	1959	Epsilon Kappa

Panhellenic Council Recognized Chapters
Organization	Greek Letters	Date Founded	Chapter
Alpha Gamma Delta	ΑΓΔ	1958	Delta Theta
Alpha Phi	ΑΦ	1928	Beta Zeta
Delta Delta Delta	ΔΔΔ	1929	Theta Tau
Delta Gamma	ΔΓ	1911	Nu
Delta Zeta	ΔΖ	2012	Pi Kappa
Gamma Phi Beta	ΓΦΒ	1910	Xi
Kappa Alpha Theta	ΚΑΘ	1920	Beta Theta
Kappa Delta	ΚΔ	1997	Zeta Chi
Kappa Kappa Gamma	ΚΚΓ	1916	Beta Kappa
Pi Beta Phi	ΠΒΦ	1923	Idaho Alpha

Multicultural Greek Council Recognized Chapters
Organization	Greek Letters	Date Founded	Chapter
Gamma Alpha Omega	ΓΑΩ	1999	Eta
Kappa Delta Chi	ΚΔΧ	2017	Beta Chi
Lambda Theta Alpha	ΛΘΑ	2006	Delta Eta
Sigma Lambda Gamma	ΣΛΓ	2010	Zeta Delta
Omega Delta Phi	ΩΔΦ	2012	Beta Lambda
Sigma Lambda Beta	ΣΛΒ	2003	Beta Gamma

== Athletics ==
Idaho athletics logo

The Idaho Vandals are the intercollegiate athletic teams representing the University of Idaho. The Vandals compete at the NCAA Division I level as a member of the Big Sky Conference.

The university's official colors are silver and gold, honoring the state's mining tradition. Because these metallic colors in tandem are not visually complementary for athletic uniforms, black and gold are the prevalent colors for the athletic teams, with an occasional use of silver. When Idaho moved out of the Big Sky to the Big West in 1996, the yellow "Green Bay" gold was changed to metallic "Vegas" gold. Yellow gold and black were the colors used by most of the varsity teams from 1978 to 1996, initiated by first-year head football coach Jerry Davitch's new uniforms for 1978.

The Kibbie Dome is the home of the Idaho Vandals for four sports (football, tennis, indoor track and field, soccer). Basketball was played in the venue until the autumn 2021 opening of the adjacent Idaho Central Credit Union Arena.

The university also offers many student club athletics for sports that are not sanctioned by the university such as:

- Baseball
- Bass fishing
- Climbing
- Cycling
- Hockey - Men's
- Horse polo
- Lacrosse - Men's and Women's
- Logger sports
- Rodeo
- Rugby - Men's and Women's
- Skiing
- Soccer - Men's
- Softball
- Trap shooting
- Ultimate frisbee - Men's and Women's
- Volleyball - Men's
- Water polo
- Wrestling

== See also ==
- List of land-grant universities
- List of forestry universities and colleges
- Space-grant colleges
