= Dement Printing Company =

- U.S. National Register of Historic Places
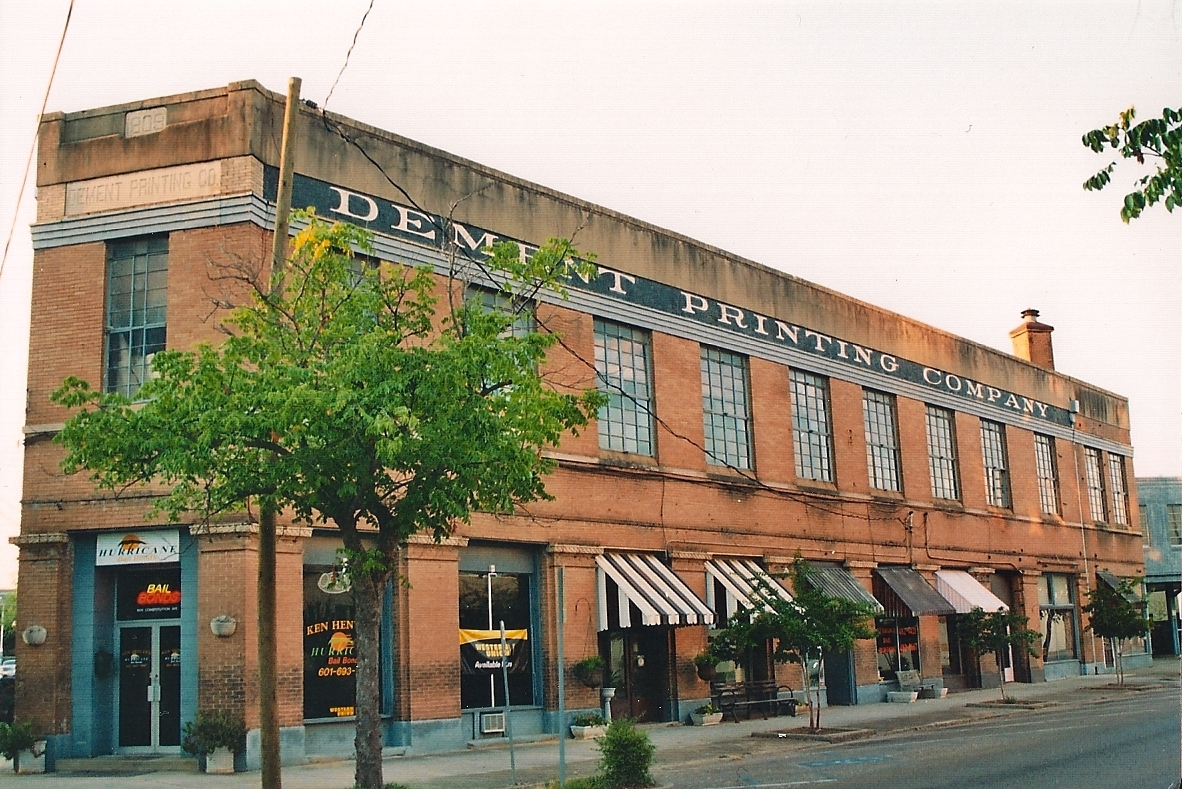
- Dement Printing Company in 2009

- Location within Mississippi Location within the United States
- Location: 2002 6th St, Meridian, Mississippi
- Coordinates: 32°21′55″N 88°41′57″W
- Built: 1909
- MPS: Meridian MRA
- NRHP reference No.: 79003387
- Added to NRHP: December 18, 1979

The Dement Printing Company is a historic printing company in Meridian, Mississippi established in 1875. The building in which the company currently operates was built in 1909 and listed on the National Register of Historic Places in 1979. The company was owned and operated by the Dement family until it was sold in 2016 to Melissa Love and Sara Love, two local sisters. They now operate Generations Fine Paper and Gifts at Dement Printing.

== Foundation ==
Though the Dement Printing Company wasn't officially founded until 1875, the Dement family was in the business of printing well before then. The first Dement to learn the printing trade was James Prentiss Dement (1815–1867), who became an apprentice in 1831. James' son, John Joseph Dement (1844–1926), began the Dement Printing Company in the Lockhard Building at the corner of 25th Avenue and Front Street in 1875. Charles Pinckney Dement (1842–1913), John's brother, is listed in the 1882 Meridian Business Directory as a "book and job printer" in the company. Charles, along with his son James Washington Dement (1874–1964), also founded The Meridian Star, Meridian's only daily newspaper, in 1898.

The business was later sold to John Joseph's son, John Vance Dement (1873–1949), who moved the business to the intersection of 23rd Avenue and 4th Street. John Vance partnered with his brother, Frank Eugene Dement (1878–1963), and one other helper. John Vance and Frank again moved the business to a building located at 2315 4th Street in 1900. The business continued to grow during the seven years it was located at this site, adding not only more employees but more printing equipment as well.

== Company building ==
In 1909 the company had grown enough that the Dements decided to construct their own building at 2002 6th Street. The building, now listed on the National Register of Historic Places, is notable for its inclusion of classical elements in an industrial structure. The two-story brick building lies on a triangular block, giving it an unusual shape. The main entrance is located at the intersection of 20th Avenue and 6th Street on a cutaway corner. Above the main entrance, the company name and construction date are inscribed into the face of the building. A water table is painted white, and the capitals of the pilasters below each window bay contain a unique "running-dog" pattern. An old side entrance, later enclosed, was highlighted by a stone cornice with corbels which also featured this running-dog pattern.

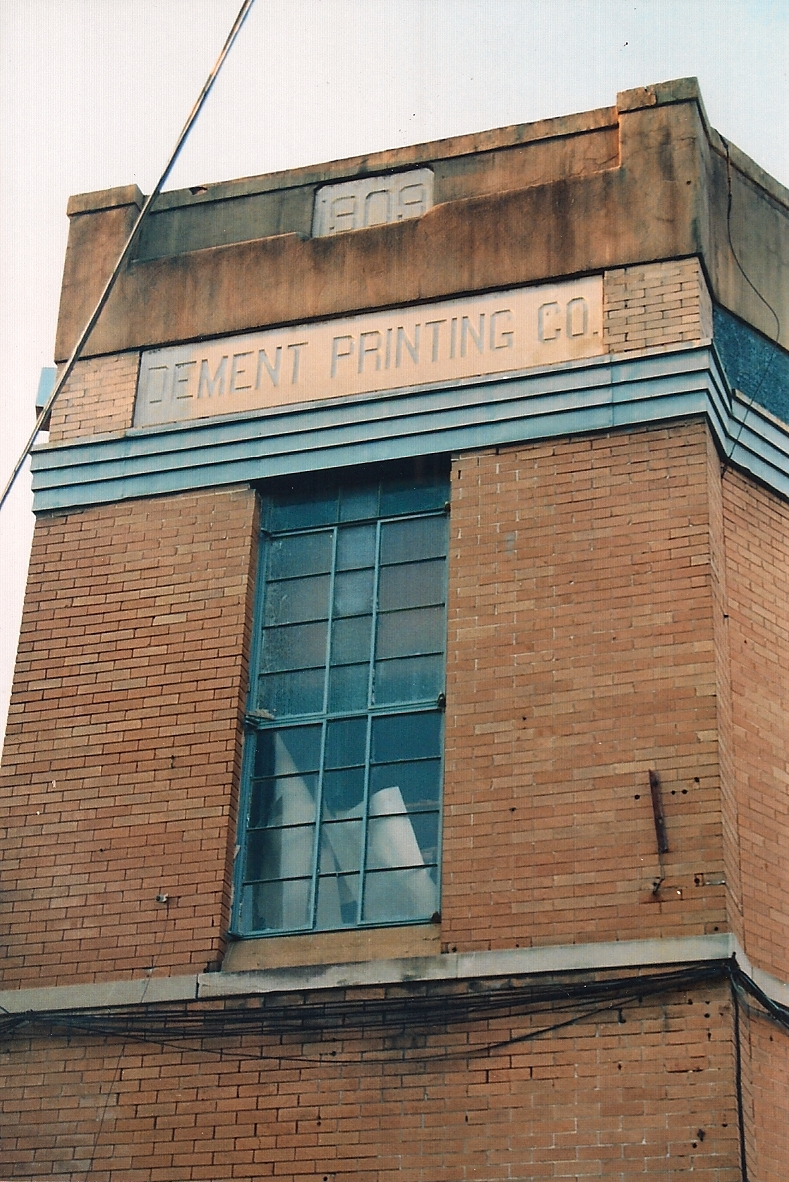
Entrance to Dement Printing Company, showing the company name and year of construction

The building has been altered several times since its construction. New space for offices, a composing room, a press room, an offset printing room, and a bindery room have been added over the 100+ years in which the company has operated. At its peak the company took up nearly the entire block and employed 70 people, making it one of the largest printing companies in the state.

== Later generations ==
Frank Dement sold his share of the business to his brother, John Vance, and moved to Texas in 1913. After John Vance died in 1949, his children took over the business. All seven of his children worked in the business at some time during their lives. John Ernest Dement (b. April 29, 1944), grandson of John Vance through James H Dement (1915–1987), (Note: The Ancestry.com page for John Vance Dement lists seven children (3 sons and 4 daughters), consistent with the Mississippi Business reference. John H Dement, one of John Vance's sons has birth date February 10, 1915, on Ancestry.com, consistent with this page on Genealogy.com, listing the father of John Ernest Dement as "James Dement", born on February 10, 1915. From this, it can be inferred that "James Dement" on Genealogy.com and "James H Dement" on Ancestry.com are in fact the same person, beyond reasonable doubt. This means that John Ernest Dement is the grandson of John Vance Dement.) took over the company in 1974. His wife, Judy, and children, Corey and Scott, also help with the business. Corey and Scott are thus the fifth generation to be involved in the family business, beginning with the founder, John Joseph Dement. Scott Bancroft took over in 2016.

In 2000, Dement Printing opened another shop, Generations Fine Paper and Gifts in 2000. In 2016 it was sold to two local sisters, Melissa Love and Sara Love.

== Products ==
Throughout its lifetime, Dement Printing Company has produced many different products. At the turn of the 20th century when the business was located on 4th Street, popular products included letterheads, envelopes, statements, circulars, and order blanks. During World War II, Dement Printing Company was asked to fill a $26,000 order of carbon paper for Brookley Field in Mobile, Alabama. The company was also asked to print blueprints for the Air Base at Key Field in Meridian. Other products and services that have been offered by the company include book bindings, ruling, lithographing, photostating, and rubber stamps.

When desktop publishing and home printing grew in popularity, Dement (and many other printing businesses) saw a great reduction in sales. The company shrank from its peak of 70 employees to 22. To cope with the change, the company created a "Generations" department, which prints wedding favors (invitations, picture books, etc.) and baby pictures. The company has also profited from selling office supplies and rents out parts of the building to other businesses.

== See also ==
- Dement House, a Mississippi Landmark
