= Dement-Zinser House =

Historic house in Illinois, United States

- U.S. National Register of Historic Places
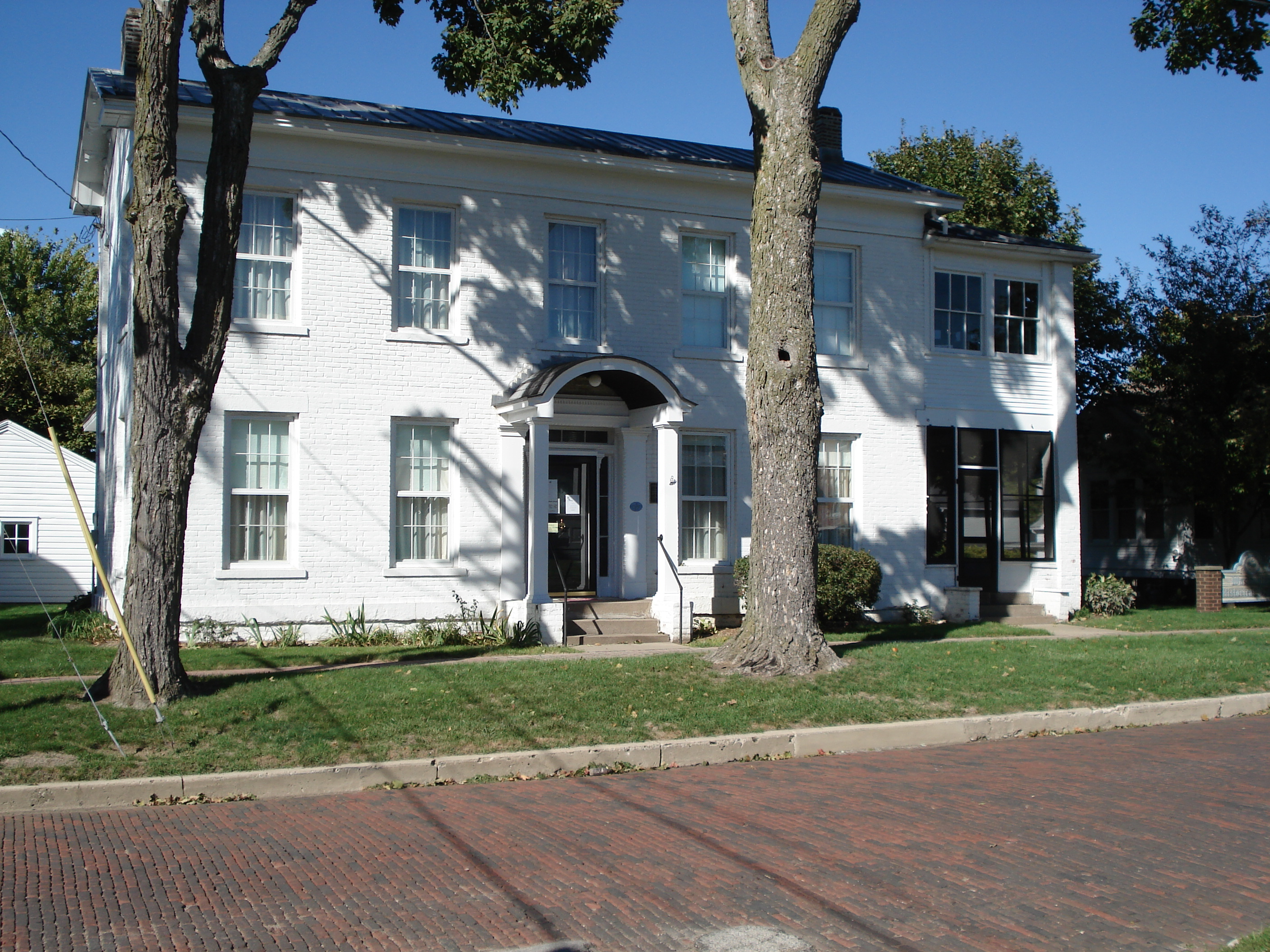

- Location within Illinois Location within the United States
- Location: 105 Zinser Place, Washington, Illinois
- Coordinates: 40°42′16″N 89°24′26″W
- Area: less than one acre
- Built: 1858
- Architectural style: Greek Revival
- NRHP reference No.: 02001411
- Added to NRHP: November 27, 2002

The Dement-Zinser House is a historic house located at 105 Zinser Place in Washington, Illinois. The house was built in 1858 for Richard C. Dement, a businessman and riverboat owner. Its Greek Revival design features a transom and sidelights around the front door, a cornice with a frieze board, and a gable roof with eave returns. The house is the only standing Greek Revival house in Washington and may be the oldest house in the city. Dement sold the house only three years after building it, and it passed through several owners until Dr. Harley Zinser acquired it in 1905. Zinser used his home as his doctor's office, from which he served as a respected village doctor; he also made house calls, delivered babies, and even treated animals as part of his work. The house remained in Zinser's family until 1994, when the Washington Historical Society bought it for a museum.

The house was added to the National Register of Historic Places on November 27, 2002.
