= Michael Felts =

American deaf gay activist (1956–1996)

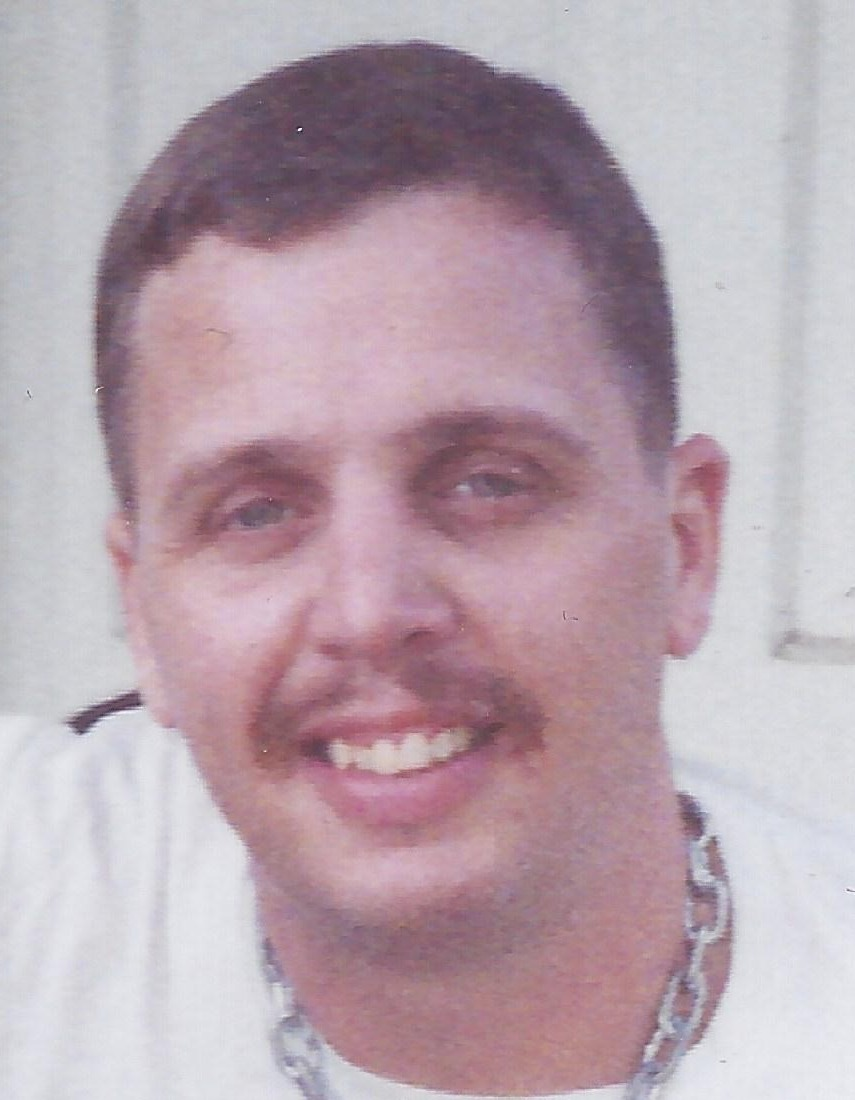
- Felts in 1992
- Born: Michael Paul Felts; August 20, 1956; RAF Burtonwood, Cheshire, England
- Died: November 16, 1996 (aged 40); Washington, D.C., U.S.
- Cause of death: HIV/AIDS
- Education: Washington School for the Deaf; Gallaudet University
- Occupation: Activity
- Known for: HIV/AIDS activism in the deaf gay community

Michael Paul Felts (August 20, 1956 – November 16, 1996) was an American deaf gay activist.

== Early life ==
Felts was born at RAF Burtonwood in the United Kingdom, the son of SMSgt Walter Earl Felts and Greta Mary Johnson. The family returned to the United States when Felts was two years old, settling in Colonial Heights, Virginia. Owing to his father's military work, the family moved around frequently. He graduated from the Washington School for the Deaf in 1977, and from Gallaudet University in 1982.

== Activism ==
Michael Felts was an activist in the deaf gay community, particularly regarding HIV/AIDS activism. He began his work in California, serving as the statewide coordinator for the Deaf Empowerment and Action for Freedom's "No on Prop 64" initiative. Felts was diagnosed with HIV in 1987, and when receiving the diagnosis he had no interpreter and was provided with his test results by a handwritten note. His own difficulty receiving information and care, combined with observing how others in the deaf community were treated by medical professionals, spurred him to move to Texas.

In 1988, he co-established the Dallas County Deaf AIDS Task Force Committee with Marc Lerro, one of the earliest HIV prevention programs focused on the deaf community. During his time in Texas, he was a speaker at the 1989 March on Austin for Lesbian/Gay Equal Rights, alongside Cleve Jones, Roberta Achtenberg, Hilary Rosen, and others. After returning to California in 1989, he worked as a statistician with the National Deaf AIDS Project, and produced research identifying gaps in AIDS education for deaf and hard of hearing Americans. In 1991, his work in Texas yielded a commendation from then-Governor Ann Richards. In 1993, he was the chairperson of the National Conference on Deafness and AIDS, and after moving to Washington, D.C. he participated in demonstrations, and was arrested alongside other activists. In 1995, he founded Deaf AIDS Action, which provided counseling and testing services, a food bank, and other support for deaf and hard of hearing people living with HIV in the nation's capital.

In addition to his HIV/AIDS work, Felts supported other aspects of the deaf gay community. In 1989, he was on the task force that established the NLA: Deaf chapter, which later became International Deaf Leather. He was also co-chair of the 1991 Rainbow Alliance of the Deaf conference.

== Death ==
Felts died at home on Capitol Hill with Marc Lerro and Bill Terrell by his side on November 16, 1996, after living with AIDS for nearly ten years. In 2019, he was honored by the Washington Blade as an "AIDS Hero."
