= Deaf Queer Men Only =

International gathering for Deaf queer men

- Abbreviation: DQMO
- Formation: October 2008
- Region served: Worldwide

Deaf Queer Men Only (DQMO) is an international biennial gathering for Deaf queer men. DQMO was founded in San Francisco in 2008 and seven cities in three countries have hosted DQMO. The mission of DQMO is to "provide a nurturing space for multicultural Deaf queer men to gather, build networks, share emotional support, and expand knowledge about civil rights, health, leadership and multicultural identities."

Each DQMO features workshops and social events organized by a volunteer host committee of Deaf queer men based in that city. All attendees at DQMO may bid to host the next DQMO and vote on bids.

== History ==
The Deaf Lesbian Festival helped inspire the creation of DQMO. The eight founders of DQMO were Don Baer, Jim Brune, Daniel Girard, Todd Higgins, Brian Martinez, Ken Mikos, David Weiss, and Butch Zein.

The inaugural DQMO in 2008 included a "Cum Out" welcome party and a "Wipe Off" closing ceremony, preceded by an announcement that the host committee was "hard" at work planning the event. This humor and sex-positivity has remained throughout DQMO's history, including in 2018's "Blue Ball" gala.

In 2014, DQMO marched in the Stockholm Pride Parade.

In 2016, the Deafies in Drag participated in DQMO.

== DQMO Events ==
| Number | Year | Month/Dates | Location | Theme |
|---|---|---|---|---|
| 1st | 2008 | October 2–5 | San Francisco, United States | A Weekend Celebration of Our Identity |
| 2nd | 2010 | September 28 – October 3 | San Francisco, United States | A Time to Celebrate Our Journey |
| 3rd | 2012 | August 1–5 | Chicago, United States | A Time to DeBrief |
| 4th | 2014 | August 1–6 | Stockholm, Sweden | Across the Generations - We Are Family |
| 5th | 2016 | October 12–16 | Phoenix, United States | Celebrating Equality Across the Universe |
| 6th | 2018 | August 1–5 | San Diego, United States | Stay Classy, San Diego |
COVID-19 Pandemic forced Toronto's team to postpone the gathering to 2022
| 7th | 2022 | August 3–7 | Toronto, Canada | Canada, Eh? |
| 8th | 2024 | July 17-21 | Boston, United States | Spilling the Tea... |
| 9th | 2026 | July 29 - August 2 | Minneapolis, United States | Minnesota Nice: Paul Bunyan & Babe the Blue Ox |
| 10th | 2028 | TBD | Washington, DC, United States | TBD |

== Hosts ==
- 2008: Don Baer, Jim Brune, Daniel Girard, Todd Higgins, Brian Martinez, Ken Mikos, David Weiss, and Butch Zein.
- 2010: Don Baer, Jim Brune, Daniel Girard, Todd Higgins, Brian Martinez, Ken Mikos, David Weiss, and Butch Zein.
- 2012: Scott Mosley, Matt Andersen, and Juan Bernal.
- 2014: Jonas Brannvall, Emil Bejersten, and David Lars-Gunnar Mollefors
- 2016: Ivanito Tauscher, Mark Tauscher, David Martinez, Masa Nakama, Sean Norris, Kenton Twight, Sean Furman, and Timothy Sanger
- 2018: Jesse Jones III, Razi Hall, Colin McAteer, Luis Moreno, Rocco Ornelas, Sasha Matunine, and Derek Shirane
- 2022: Darren Holst, Jason Morden, Jeff Panasuik, Oliver Luehr, Ricky Guzman, Darrell Villa, and Krishna Madaparthi.
- 2024: Thomas Minch, Mikey Krajnak, Matt Sweet, Kelly Kim, Jim Lipsky, Todd Higgins, Mike Festa, Todd Schulbaum, and Krishna Madaparthi.
- 2026: Heath Focken, Jack Williams, Andrew Bjarnvold, Jose Magallanes, Patrick Vellia, Reed Kutney, Rocky Boyd, Tim Riker, Everett Glenn, and Troy Mezera

== See also ==
- Deaf Queer Resource Center
- Rainbow Alliance of the Deaf
