= Arnaud Balard =

French artist (born 1971)

- Born: 1971 (age 53–54); Toulouse, France
- Known for: Surdism manifesto
- Notable work: Sign Union flag
- Movement: Surdism, De'VIA

Arnaud Balard (born 1971) is a French deafblind artist. In 2009, Balard wrote a manifesto outlining his philosophy of Surdism, an artistic, philosophical, and cultural movement celebrating deaf culture and deaf arts (including cinema, theater, literature, and visual arts). He is also known for designing the Sign Union flag, an image intended to represent global unity for deaf and deafblind people.

== Early life and education ==
Arnaud Balard was born in 1971 in Toulouse. He was born deaf; as an adult, he developed tunnel vision and was diagnosed with deteriorating vision caused by Usher syndrome in 1999.

From age three to seven, Balard lived with an aunt to attend deaf school. Since he was able to learn French, he attended mainstream schools from age eight to eighteen. He attended Ecole Sainte Therese and Collège Privé Sainte-geneviève Saint-joseph in Rodez. His education was conducted through oral French; he did not learn French Sign Language until he was an adult.

He attended Université de Toulouse-Le Mirail from 1992 to 1993, before transferring to the École MJM Graphic Design, studying there from 1993 to 1995. From 1995 to 1998, Balard attended the European Academy of Art in Brittany on the Rennes campus, graduating with the congratulations of the jury. In 2000, he moved to Brussels and studied at l'École nationale supérieure des arts visuels de La Cambre.

== Activism and artwork ==
Balard writes, teaches classes and workshops, and creates artwork that promotes deaf culture. In 2009, he wrote a 22-page manifesto coining the word "Surdism" (from the French word for deaf, sourd) and arguing for the importance of deaf arts and greater acceptance of deaf identity. Balard was unaware at the time of the similar De'VIA arts movement which had originated in the United States in 1989, but Surdism differs from De'VIA in its inclusion of arts beyond visual arts, such as theater, cinema, and literary works. The Surdism manifesto urges the use of creative works to challenge hearing privilege and advocate for equality, ending with the statement: "Audism denigrates, Deafhood welcomes, Surdism reveals."

As Balard's vision has deteriorated, his artwork has shifted from drawing to digital art, and again from digital visual art to theater and performance art.

=== Sign Union flag ===
The Sign Union flag

Balard is also known as the designer of the Sign Union flag. After studying flags around the world and vexillology principles for two years, Balard revealed the design of the flag, featuring the stylized outline of a hand. The three colors which make up the flag design are representative of Deafhood and humanity (dark blue), sign language (turquoise), and enlightenment and hope (yellow). Balard intended the flag to be an international symbol which welcomes deaf people. The Deaf French National Federation approved the flag in May 2014 and it has been flown in locations around the world.
