= Seen and Not Heard =

Podcast

Seen and Not Heard is an independent scripted fiction podcast created by Caroline Mincks and published in 2020. It is a six-part limited series about hearing loss, deaf gain, navigating the world through changing circumstances. The show is notable for its deaf representation, depicting the daily life of a woman who has almost entirely lost her hearing. It is one of few audio dramas to feature a deaf main character.

== Format ==
Seen and Not Heard is a semi-autobiographical slice-of-life fiction podcast with six 20-minute long episodes and four shorter prologues. It follows Bet Kline, a woman who has become recently deaf, and must figure out how to navigate her new life. Scenes within the show include moments of immersion where the listeners hears in the same way that Bet hears, mimicking the experience of being hard of hearing. Throughout the series, Bet struggles with her new disability, her family's understanding of it, and creating an identity beyond her loss of hearing. All deaf characters in the podcast are played by deaf voice actors, and episode transcripts are provided.

== Critical reception ==
Seen and Not Heard has been praised for its sound design, which includes muffled scenes from the viewpoint of the main character who has lost her hearing, and its honest depiction of living with disability. In 2020, it was on Bello Collective's 100 Outstanding Podcasts list and The Atlantic's 50 Best Podcasts list.
