= Betty G. Miller =

American painter

- Born: July 27, 1934; Chicago, Illinois
- Died: December 3, 2012 (aged 78)
- Education: Gallaudet University
- Notable work: Ameslan Prohibited
- Awards: Alice Cogswell Award for service to deaf people 2009

Betty Gloria Miller (July 27, 1934 – December 3, 2012), also known as Bettigee (which was her signature on her artworks) was an American artist who became known as the "Mother of De'VIA" (Deaf View/Image Art).

== Family and early life ==
She was born hard of hearing in Chicago to deaf parents Ralph Reese Miller, Sr., and Gladys Hedrick Miller. She attended Bell School in Chicago which was an oral school where she was not allowed to sign, but she learned sign language at home. After attending oral school, she transferred to a public school, where she continued to struggle with language and communication. Her father was also an artist, which played a huge role in her becoming an artist herself.

Miller had two older brothers, Ben and Ralph, who were also hard of hearing.

== Education ==
Miller attended Gallaudet University where she studied commercial art. She went on to become an instructor for commercial art at Gallaudet while also training at Maryland School of Design learning illustration. She earned her MFA, then achieved a rare accomplishment for deaf women by earning a doctorate degree in art education at Pennsylvania State University. She continued teaching and exhibiting at Gallaudet for many years.

== Career ==
After her tenure at Gallaudet was up, Miller moved to Austin, Texas. There, she co-founded Spectrum, Focus on Deaf Artists, which brought together other painters, dancers, and artists contributing to deaf culture.

In 1989 Miller, along with 8 other deaf artists, coined the term "De'VIA" (Deaf view image art). The purpose of this movement was the define the difference between art made by deaf people, and art made about the deaf experience. Miller was the first known artists to exhibit art about the deaf experience, some notable works being "Ameslan Prohibited", "Let There Be Light", and "Bell School". Most of her was known as "resistance De'VIA" which is work that talks about the negative aspects of the deaf experience. Other De'VIA artists include Dr. Paul Johnston, Dr. Deborah Sonnestrahl, Chuck Baird, Guy Wonder, Alex Wilhite, Sandi Inches-Vasnick, Nancy Creighton, Lai-Yok Ho.

When Miller was 50 years old she completely lost her hearing due to a high fever.

Miller was also a Certified Alcohol and Drug Counselor, specializing in working with deaf patients. She published a book titled, "Deaf & Sober: Journeys Through Recovery" about the struggles that deaf addicts face during recovery and how to overcome those struggles.

In 2009 she was awarded the Alice Cogswell Award for service to deaf people.

== Death and legacy ==
Miller died on December 3, 2012, of sepsis, which led to kidney failure. She was survived by her partner of 25 years, Nancy Creighton. Creighton was also a creative and met Miller through Spectrum. Creighton now shares Miller's work and information about her life to keep her legacy alive.

The Betty G. Miller Fellowship Award was named in her honor; it provides financial assistance to deaf women pursuing doctorate degrees at Gallaudet University.

== Published works ==
- Miller, Betty G. (1976). Deaf Learners as Artists (PDF). illustrated by Nancy Creighton. Pennsylvania State University. Archived from the original (PDF) on 2017-09-10. Doctoral thesis.
- Miller, Betty G.; Paul, Frank Allen; Bahan, Benjamin J. (1984). Sign Language House. DawnSign Press. ISBN 0915035030.
- Miller, Betty G. (1998). Deaf & Sober: Journeys Through Recovery. National Association of the Deaf. ISBN 0913072869.
