= Deaf flag =

Flag that symbolises the Deaf community

- Deaf flag
- Use: Cultural flag
- Adopted: 9 July 2023; 3 years ago (approved by the World Federation of the Deaf); 25 May 2014; 12 years ago (recognised by the National Federation of the Deaf of France)
- Design: The flag depicts a large open turquoise hand on another yellow hand (of which only the profile around the turquoise hand is visible) with the tips of the fingers extending outside the navy blue background, so that the fingers 'stretch out' indefinitely. turquoise yellow dark blue
- Designed by: Arnaud Balard
- Use: Cultural flag
- Design: turquoise yellow dark blue
- Use: Cultural flag
- Design: turquoise yellow dark blue

The Deaf flag or Sign Union flag is a flag that symbolises the Deaf community (especially the signing Deaf community), and is used as a form of visibility for a socio-cultural minority that is often discriminated against in various areas.

The flag was designed by the French Deafblind artist Arnaud Balard. It depicts a large open turquoise hand on another yellow hand (of which only the profile around the turquoise hand is visible). The tips of the fingers are outside the flag, so that the fingers "stretch out" indefinitely. The background colour is navy blue.

== Symbolism ==
There are several different symbols that are included in the flag (based on what is indicated by its creator):

- The hands represent the signing Deaf community and Sign language.
- The infinite fingers allude to the projection of the use of Sign language in the world, with more than 200 existing Sign Languages. The fingers also symbolise the connection with the five continents (in order from top to bottom): Europe, the Americas, Asia, Oceania and Africa.
- The colour turquoise is the world color of Sign language, Deaf culture, and the signing Deaf community (Deaf, Deafblind, CODA, Sign Language interpreters, family members).
- The colour yellow symbolizes light, life, the awakened mind, coexistence.
- The colour navy blue (dark blue) symbolises planet Earth, humanity, and is the color adopted to represent deafness (represented by a blue ribbon). In this way, non-signing Deaf and Deafblind people (oralists) would be included.

The design aims for the flag to be a symbol of openness, inclusiveness and union, rather than isolation or segregation.

== History ==
At the beginning of the 21st century, the World Federation of the Deaf initiated a process to define the Deaf flag.

=== The Swedish proposal ===
In 2009, during the Congress of the Swedish Confederation of the Deaf in Leksand, the Swedish National Association of the Deaf (Sveriges Dövas Riksförbund, SDR) was commissioned to present a flag at the 16th World Congress of the World Federation of the Deaf, held from 18 to 24 July 2011 in Durban (South Africa).

At the XVIII General Assembly of the World Federation of the Deaf, held in Durban on 16 and 17 July 2011, the Swedish National Association of the Deaf made a motion for the recognition of a flag representing the Deaf community. Sweden proposed an abstract flag made up of different vertical stripes of different widths, in turquoise and different shades of blue, and a white stripe. This flag represents the five continents (by the five colours of the flag) as well as the sky and water (symbolised by blue) and the Deaf (by turquoise). The Swedish National Association of the Deaf proposed that the income generated by the flag should go to the World Federation of the Deaf.

The idea of having a Deaf flag was largely accepted by the ordinary members (consisting of a national Deaf organisation), but the World Federation of the Deaf postponed the discussion on the design of the flag and its position on supporting the use of the flag proposed by Sweden to the next board meeting, to be held in Norway in November 2011. The APYS [Asia Pacific Youth Section] has discussed the proposal for a Deaf flag that was made at the General Assembly of the World Federation of the Deaf in South Africa. In the end, no position was taken.

There were many opinions against the design of the Swedish flag, various controversies and parodies on social networks, comparing it to pyjamas, a shower curtain or a barcode.

The World Federation of the Deaf decided to postpone the issue to the II International Conference of the World Federation of the Deaf held in Sydney (Australia) from 16 to 20 October 2013. In the corresponding vote, an absolute majority was not reached, so the proposal was rejected with the following results:

- Yes: 21 votes.
- No: 11 votes.

=== The French proposal ===
In March 2013, French Deafblind artist (with Usher syndrome) Arnaud Balard designed a flag symbolising Sign Language, which he calls the "Deaf and Sign Union Flag" or, in its shorter version, "Deaf Union Flag" or "Sign Union Flag" (preferred by a large part of the Deaf community because it includes the term "sign", which identifies that community, and because it is inclusive of all Sign Language users; instead of the term "Deaf", which is often understood and used as "disease"). Before designing the flag, he spent two years studying the various existing flags and learning vexillology.

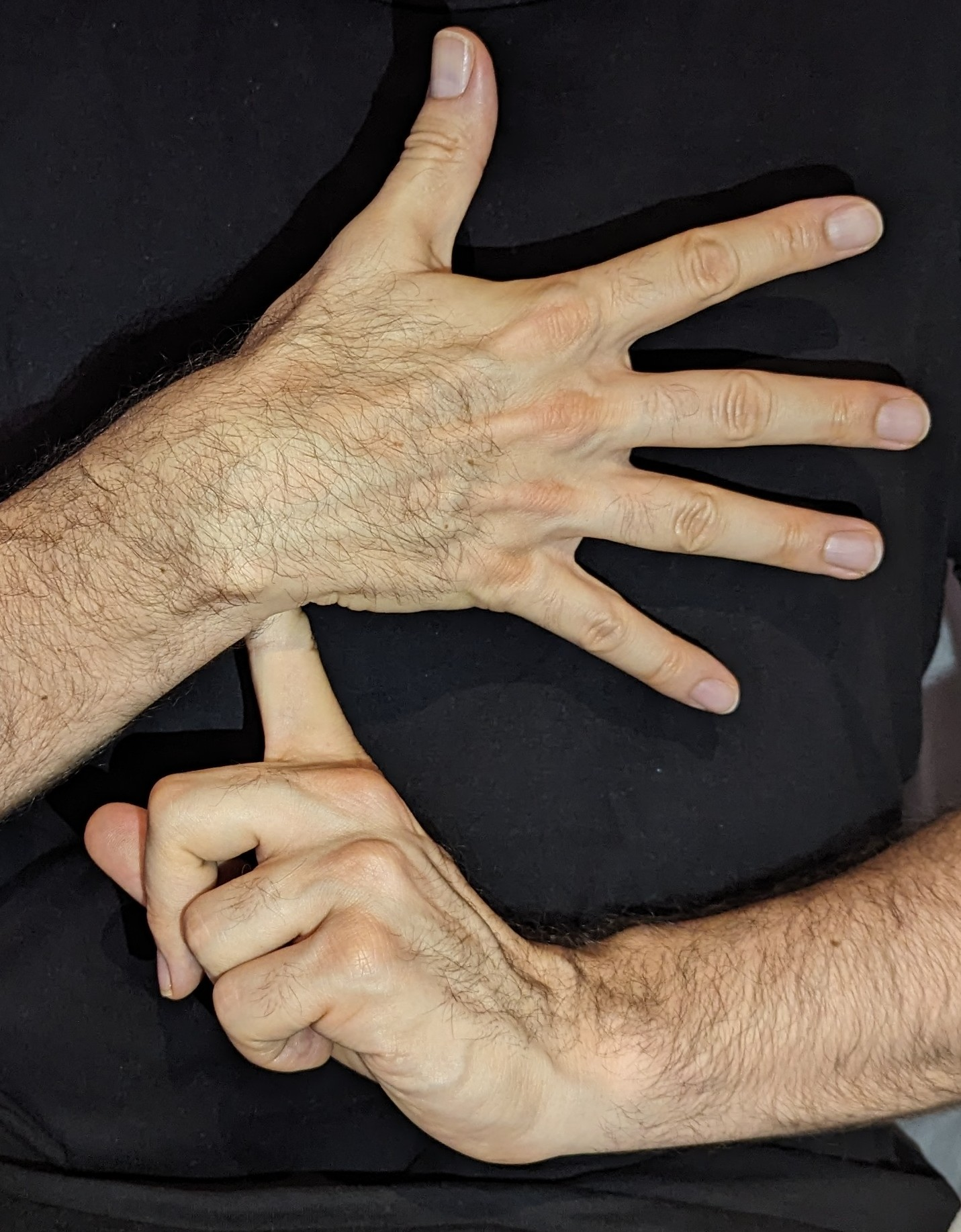
Deaf flag sign.

The sign given by the flag designer himself is configured as follows:

- dominant hand stretched out, fingers spread, palm facing the signer.
- non-dominant hand with only the index finger extended, the tip of which rests on the inside of the wrist of the dominant hand.

Arnaud Balard registered and protected his design with the INPI (Institut National de la Propriété Intellectuelle) in France before publicly displaying his flag. He then registered his design for international protection with the WIPO (World Intellectual Property Organisation).

On 19 April 2013, the "Sign Union Flag" was first displayed during the first ASL (American Sign Language) and Deaf Pride parade in Washington D.C., and was used by Audism Free America.

On 25 May 2014, the French National Federation of the Deaf (Fédération nationale des sourds de France, FNSF), one of the ordinary members of the World Federation of the Deaf, recognised and approved the flag designed by Balard.

During the XIX General Assembly of the World Federation of the Deaf held in Istanbul (Turkey) on 26 and 27 July 2015, the French National Federation of the Deaf presented the flag designed by Arnaud Balard to propose its recognition as a Deaf flag for international use. After voting, the proposal was rejected with the following results:

- Yes: 32 votes.
- No: 20 votes.
- Abstention: 12.

As the absolute majority in favour (33 votes) required to approve the proposal was not reached, the proposal was rejected.

One of the reasons for the lack of support for the French proposal was that the World Federation of the Deaf would not have exclusive rights to the flag.

Recognised by the Deaf community, this flag has been displayed on various French official buildings (for example, in 2016 in front of Montpellier City Hall, in 2019 on the façade of Poitiers City Hall, at the Espace Tuilerie of Montchanin, or on the esplanade in front of Massy City Hall), and distributed in several countries, including the United States, Italy, Morocco, Scotland and Colombia.

=== Approval by the World Federation of the Deaf ===
At the 2015 General Assembly, following the vote (where the votes in favour did not exceed an absolute majority), the World Federation of the Deaf established a "Deaf Flag Committee" consisting of five ordinary members: France, Iran, Nepal, the Russian Federation, and Sweden. The objective was to select one or more design proposals for the Deaf flag to be presented and voted on by the ordinary members of the World Federation of the Deaf at the XX General Assembly in Paris (France) in 2019.

In January 2018, the committee, with the support of the board of the World Federation of the Deaf, called for graphic designers to join the Deaf Flag Design Review Committee (candidates must be nominated by an ordinary member).

In December 2018, the World Federation of the Deaf launched a call for design proposals for a Deaf flag. The deadline for submitting designs was 28 February 2019.

In addition to the Sign Union Flag, several proposals for flag designs were submitted for a vote in July 2019.

At the XX General Assembly held in Paris (France) in July 2019, the representatives of the ordinary members of the World Federation of the Deaf debated France's motion for a deaf flag, but the proposal for a deaf flag was rejected with the following voting results:

- Yes: 31 votes.
- No: 47 votes.

Having failed to approve a deaf flag, a particular flag was no longer voted on.

Although the issue of the Deaf flag was raised at the General Assemblies in 2011, 2015 and 2019, without any of the proposed designs being adopted, the Board of the World Federation of the Deaf decides to reopen the process: in November 2022, the World Federation of the Deaf launches a call for design proposals for a Deaf flag, to be presented and voted on at the XXI General Assembly in Jeju Island (South Korea). Participation is only allowed through national organisations of deaf people that are members of the World Federation of the Deaf, and the deadline for submitting designs is the 6 January 2023.

On the 9 July 2023, during the XXI General Assembly of the World Federation of the Deaf, to be held on 9–10 July 2023 on Jeju Island (South Korea), the "approval of the idea of having a deaf flag" was put to a vote, with the following results:

- Yes: 54 votes.
- No: 12 votes.

The vote was 81.82% in favour of having a Deaf flag.

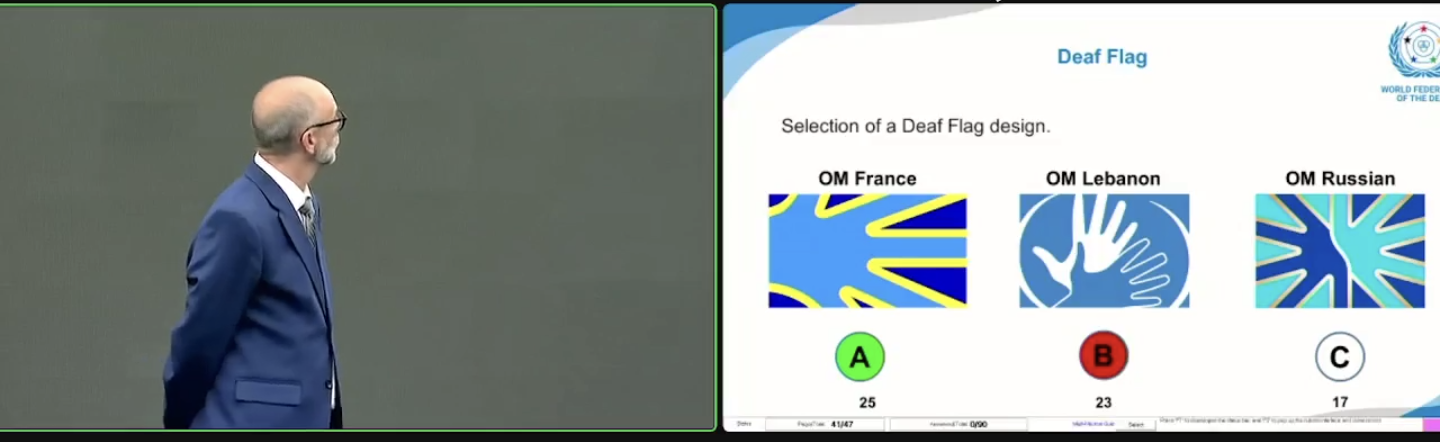
Election of the Deaf flag by the ordinary members of the World Federation of the Deaf during the 21st General Assembly on 9 July 2023.

The flag proposals received from three ordinary members of the World Federation of the Deaf were then presented, discussed and voted on: Lebanon, Russia, and France.

The proposal by the Lebanese Federation of the Deaf (الاتحاد اللبناني للصم, LFD) consists of two hands, a blue hand on a white hand (representing different cultures and symbolising Sign language and the Deaf signing community), two white brackets, one on each side (symbolising a circle around the Deaf community, which is interconnected and a small world), and a blue background.

The proposal of the Russian Society of the Deaf (Всероссийское общество глухих, ВОГ) consisted of two palms open from the centre, one turquoise and the other blue (symbolising Sign language), both surrounded by a golden outline. The background of the blue hand is turquoise and the background of the turquoise hand is blue.

The voting for the "selection of the design of a Deaf flag" had the following results:

- France: 25 votes.
- Lebanon: 23 votes.
- Russia: 17 votes.

A second vote was taken, with the following results:

- France: 36 votes.
- Lebanon: 31 votes.

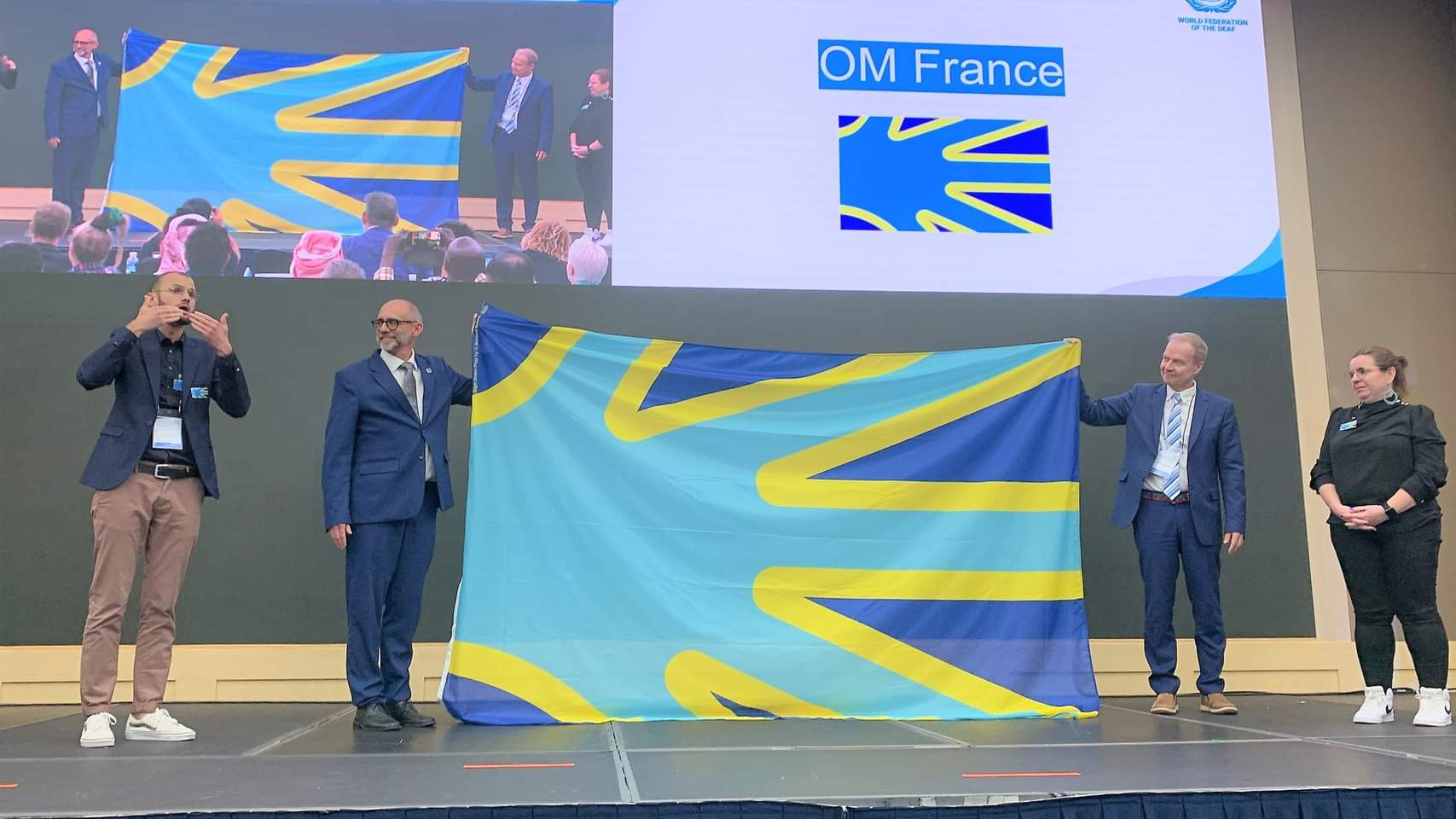
Deaf flag adopted by the World Federation of the Deaf on 9 July 2023 during the XXI General Assembly.

The French proposal was finally approved as the new Deaf flag and a debate ensued as to what the flag should be called: Deaf flag or Sign Union flag. The name Deaf flag was chosen as the other option had little support.

Before the flag vote, there was a controversy over the resemblance of the Russian flag's design to that of the French flag.

Nepal also submitted a flag proposal, but it was rejected as it failed to meet the submission deadlines.

== See also ==
- Deaf culture
- Audism
- Deaf culture in the United States
- Sign name
- Deaf theatre
- U výčepu, a Czech sign language comedy play
- List of Deaf films
- Deaf theology
- Deaf mental health care
- Language deprivation in deaf and hard of hearing children
