= Ella Mae Lentz =

American author, poet, teacher and advocate (born 1954)

- Born: May 5, 1954 (age 72); Berkeley, California
- Education: California School for the Deaf
- Alma mater: Gallaudet University
- Occupations: Writer, educator
- Notable work: The Signing Naturally Curriculum Series, National consortium of Programs for the Training of Sign Language Instructors (NCPTSLI)

Ella Mae Lentz (born May 5, 1954) is a Deaf American author, poet, teacher, and advocate.

== Biography ==
Lentz was born in Berkeley, California, to two deaf parents. Her brother was also deaf.

Lentz graduated from the California School for the Deaf (currently the California School for the Deaf, Fremont) in Berkeley in 1971. After graduating, she attended Gallaudet University where she received dual bachelor's degrees in Drama and English, graduating in 1975.

Lentz has done research on American Sign Language (ASL) at several research institutions, including Northeastern University in Boston, the Salk Institute in San Diego, and the University of California, San Francisco.

ASL Presents was founded by Lentz in 2007, located in Hayward, California. The company focuses on the how to coach, consult, present, perform, and teach ASL and Deaf Culture curriculum.

== Written production ==
Lentz has developed training material as well as educational material such as:

- National Consortium of Programs for the Training of Sign Language Instructors (NCPTSLI): Lentz developed and tested the curricula for this project as well as recruited and trained the instructors. This project was a grant project combined with the National Association of the Deaf, with the hopes of reforming ASL instruction.
- The Signing Naturally Curriculum Series, which is a best-seller (Lentz was a co-author). The series was given a three-year federal grant through the Funds for Improvement of Post Secondary Education, and was produced in hopes to teach ASL as a second language. Today many schools use this series as their textbooks for their ASL classes in high school as well as college.
- The Deafhood Foundation.

== Productions ==
- The PBS children's television show Rainbow's End.
- A televised talk show in 1974 called Silent Perspectives
- Dennis Cokely and Charlotte Baker's ASL curriculum known as "The Green Books".
- Starred in a Milwaukee Repertory production of Children of a Lesser God in 1982, playing the leading role of Sarah Norman.

== Poetry ==
Lentz is widely known in the Deaf community for her poetry. Many people have analyzed and studied her poems.

- The Treasure: Poems by Ella Mae Lentz
- Star Spangled Banner Poem on YouTube
- The Poem "The Door"
- video poems

== Recognition ==
- On August 27, 2009, Ella was honored by the Purple Communications as one of the ten finalists for its "Dream Bigger Campaign".
- She is recognized for her achievements as well as her contributions to the Deaf community by being appointed a member of the California Association of the Deaf as a member of the board of directors.
- She was also recognized for her achievements as a "Famous Alumna" at the California School for the Deaf.
- She was also awarded the Kappa Gamma Poetry Award at Gallaudet University.
- She is a part of the Deaf Bilingual Coalition.

== Family ==
Lentz' partner is Judy D. Gough. They have five children, the youngest being deaf, and ten grandchildren, of whom three are deaf.
