= De'VIA =

Art genre highlighting the deaf experience

Deaf View Image Art, abbreviated as De'VIA, is a genre of visual art that intentionally represents the Deaf experience and Deaf culture. Although De'VIA works have been created throughout history, the term was first defined and recognized as an art genre in 1989. In 1989, a group of nine Deaf artists gathered at Gallaudet University shortly before the Deaf Way arts festival was being held there. Led by Betty G. Miller, known as the Mother of De'VIA, and Paul Johnston, these artists created a manifesto detailing what De'VIA is and what it includes. Since its official designation as a genre, De'VIA has helped to introduce the Deaf experience to the artistic world and give a new platform to the Deaf community.

== De'VIA Criteria ==
The De'VIA Manifesto, an original copy of which can be found in the De'VIA Curriculum, outlines the major criteria of De'VIA works. According to the manifesto and its signatories, De'VIA work is:

- representative of Deaf experiences
- uses specific artistic strategies such as color contrast and centralized focus
- generally within the field of visual fine arts and alternative media
- not exclusive to Deaf artists and not inclusive of all Deaf artists

A major point of De'VIA is its differentiation from Deaf Art. Deaf Art is a term encompassing all artists who are Deaf, while De'VIA art can be made by Deaf and hearing individuals, as long as it represents the Deaf experience and perspective. A hearing CODA (Child of deaf adult), for example, could be a contributor to De'VIA. Similarly, a Deaf artist does not necessarily belong to the De'VIA genre if their work does not use defined formal art elements common to De'VIA, such as contrastive colors and exaggerated facial features, to portray the Deaf experience.

== De'VIA Manifesto Signatories ==
Betty G. Miller and Paul Johnston held a workshop titled "Expression: American Deaf Art," which took place at Gallaudet University in May 1989. Attendees spent four days discussing the experiences and elements of Deaf art. At the culmination of this workshop and their discussions, they created a written manifesto to coin the term De'VIA and detail its characteristics. The following list contains the artists that participated in this workshop and signed the manifesto:

- Betty G. Miller, painter
- Paul Johnston, sculptor
- Deborah M. Sonnenstrahl, art historian
- Chuck Baird, painter
- Guy Wonder, sculptor
- Alex Wilhite, painter
- Sandi Inches Vasnick, fiber artist
- Nancy Creighton, fiber artist
- Lai-Yok Ho, video artist

== De'VIA Categories ==
Thematically, De'VIA consists of two basic categories; Resistance De'VIA and Affirmation De'VIA.

=== Resistance De'VIA ===
This branch of De'VIA includes artworks that showcase themes of audism, oralism, mainstreaming, cochlear implants, identity confusion, and eugenics. All of these themes, typically negative in the eyes of the artist, are brought forward as a form of protest, as resistance De'VIA conveys how Deaf people have been oppressed, colonized and marginalized.

=== Affirmation De'VIA ===
In contrast to resistance De'Via, affirmation De'VIA demonstrates themes of empowerment, ASL, affiliation, acculturation, acceptance, and Deafhood. Affirmation De'VIA highlights the positives by expressing the joy and empowerment within Deaf culture and the attributes of Deaf Gain that Deaf people share. These themes are used to express the Deaf experience in a poignant way, showing the powerful platform and perspective that the Deaf community holds.

== De'VIA Motifs ==
As in many art movements, there are common symbols (or motifs) repeatedly used among different De'VIA artists in their works. Some common motifs in De'VIA works include:

- Eyes
- Hands
- Ears
- Mouth
- Children
- Doors
- Musical instruments
- Animals

These motifs can be analyzed in different ways throughout the pieces in which they appear, however the four most prevalent motifs are the eyes, the hands, the ears, and the mouth. In most cases, these symbols are used to communicate a message concerning the communication of Deaf people among each other or in interactions within the hearing world.

=== Eyes ===
Some notable De'VIA pieces highlight the eyes by either scratching them out or switching them with other parts of the face. This can either showcase the artist's feelings of being ignored by hearing people or emphasize the importance of the eyes in ASL.

=== Hands ===
Since the hands are the primary source of ASL, many artists use them in their art. Chuck Baird notably uses hands in his artwork to show how certain signs visually represent their meaning. Hands in chains or shackles can also represent the artist's struggles with being prohibited from signing in school or at home.

== Notable De'VIA works ==
=== "Ameslan Prohibited" ===
This illustration by Betty G. Miller, which can be viewed here, is an example of resistance De'VIA. Ameslan is an old acronym for American Sign Language, which references the first few letters of each word: Ame(rican) S(ign) Lan(guage). The title references the act of not allowing Deaf people to sign. Through the shackling of hands, it conveys the message that denying Deaf people access to signed languages is harmful, represented by the broken fingers. By portraying that Deaf people are injured by disuse or banning from signed languages, Miller's work expresses some of the most common resistance De'VIA themes like oralism, mainstreaming, and oppression.

=== "Family Dog" ===
Susan Dupor's painting "Family Dog" is also a resistance De'VIA work that visually likens the Deaf child to the family pet. Seen here, the comparison stems from the Deaf child's inability to communicate with their family due to their lack of access to language. Because of that lack of access, the child is treated like an animal which has limited communication. Dupor's piece has been found provocative by many of its viewers, and protests the hearing approaches used by hearing parents of deaf children, and therefore falls under resistance De'VIA.

=== "Whale" ===
This painting by Chuck Baird, one of De'VIA's most notable contributors, serves as an example of affirmation De'VIA. The painting incorporates the sign for whale into a beautiful seascape, where a whale would be naturally found. This juxtaposition shows the iconicity of American Sign Language and subscribes to affirmation De'VIA themes such as ASL, empowerment, and Deaf gain.

=== "Oralist Child Abuse" ===
Nancy Rourke's image shows children in an oralist setting signing the letters A(merican) S(ign) L(anguage) behind their backs. Speech class and other oralism programs are a common theme in many Deaf experiences. This image provides an example of resistance De'VIA as it showcases a protest of oralism. The title references an experience that many members of the Deaf community have lived through, an experience of language deprivation which many liken to child abuse.

== See also ==
- Arnaud Balard, founder of Surdism, a similar movement celebrating Deaf art
