= Chuck Baird =

American Deaf artist

Chuck Baird (February 22, 1947 – February 10, 2012) was an American Deaf artist who was one of the more notable founders of the De'VIA art movement, an aesthetic of Deaf Culture in which visual art conveys a Deaf world view. His career spanned over 35 years and included painting, sculpting, acting, storytelling, and teaching.

== Biography ==
Chuck Baird was born Deaf and his educational career reflected on his Deaf identity. From the Kansas School for the Deaf, to Gallaudet University and finally the Rochester Institute of Technology, all his schools afforded him communication in ASL.

After being awarded his BFA from RIT, Baird worked as a set painter for the National Theatre of the Deaf (NTD), followed by a position with Spectrum-Focus on Deaf artists, a Deaf artist colony in Texas, where he served as the Visual Arts Coordinator. In between, he found time to work with Deaf media on their Emmy Award winning series for deaf children, Rainbow's End. His art was recognized internationally in the Deaf community. His first exhibition was the Deaf Artists' Exhibit: World Federation of the Deaf Conference, Gallaudet University, Washington, D.C., 1975. He held residencies at many Deaf schools, teaching and creating long-lasting artworks. Among these are a 150-foot long collage/mural he created for The Learning Center for Deaf Children in Framingham, Massachusetts, in 1995, and a 30x10 mural at Gallaudet entitled "The Five Panels: Deaf Experiences". The mural is still on exhibit and has been lauded for its importance to the Deaf experience. In it, the child signs, "Are you Deaf?" and the adult signs, "Deaf, like you!"

In May 1989, prior to the international Deaf culture festival at Gallaudet University, Deaf Way II, Baird was one of eight Deaf artists (along with Betty G. Miller) who produced a manifesto for De'VIA (Deaf View Image Art). This was a concept for Deaf art that was differentiated from art by or for Deaf people. Rather, it was art that contained a message about deaf life. The manifesto states "De'VIA represents Deaf artists and perceptions based on their Deaf experiences. It uses formal art elements with the intention of expressing innate cultural or physical Deaf experience."

Baird was renowned in the Deaf world. His artwork was included in a book on the subject, Deaf Artists in America: Colonial to Contemporary by Deborah M. Sonnenstrahl. He was commissioned to create plates for Dawn Sign Press, a Deaf publisher in Southern California. Because he was a celebrated artist in the Deaf community and due to his pioneering in developing the concepts of De'Via, his death was noted by institutions in the Deaf community including RIT/NTID, Gallaudet University, and the Texas Association of the Deaf.

On his website, he featured some of his own works that were created from the De'Via perspective. Many of his works include images of his own hands incorporated into ASL signs. Baird also established a foundation to support emerging deaf artists, the Chuck Baird Foundation.

In addition to his artwork, he was renowned as an actor and ASL storyteller. He performed as an actor with the National Theatre of the Deaf from 1980 to 1990, as well as in The Legend of the Mountain Man (2008). Some of his many ASL stories were recorded by Gallaudet University.
