= Marla Berkowitz =

American Sign Language interpreter

Marla Berkowitz is an American Sign Language (ASL) interpreter. Berkowitz is the only ASL Certified Deaf Interpreter in the US state of Ohio. During the 2020 coronavirus pandemic, she became known because of her interpretation of Ohio governor Mike DeWine's daily press conferences.

== Early life and education ==
Berkowitz was raised in a Conservative Jewish household in Rockville Centre, New York on Long Island. She is the only deaf member of her family. She has described herself as growing up "passing as a hearing-identified person".

She learned fingerspelling from her hearing mother, who had learned it from Berkowitz's teachers at the Lexington School for the Deaf in Queens. She learned ASL from classmates who were growing up in Deaf families. She has said that some of her teachers were not fluent in ASL and that her classmates would sometimes ask her to interpret. When she was 15, she joined a club for Deaf teens and learned more ASL from other club members who were also from Deaf families.

Berkowitz has master's degrees in Deaf studies from New York University and in Jewish studies from the Jewish Theological Seminary. She was the first Deaf Wexner Fellow and the first Deaf student to attend the Jewish Theological Seminary's Davis School.

== Career ==
In 1993 Berkowitz was a caseworker at the New York Society for the Deaf working with Deaf HIV-positive clients. A colleague, Naomi Brunn, approached her about a project to make New York City synagogues accessible to Deaf members. The two of them co-founded the Manhattan Young Adult Jewish Deaf (MiYAD) in 1994. The acronym in Hebrew, Hebrew: מיד, translates as "immediately", a reference to the Deaf community's feeling that they are always being asked to wait for access. Berkowitz and Brunn also founded New York's Jewish Deaf Resource Center to provide a clearinghouse for assisting the Jewish community in becoming more accessible to Deaf.

Berkowitz is a senior lecturer with the American Sign Language (ASL) program at Ohio State University.

Berkowitz is the only ASL Certified Deaf Interpreter in the US state of Ohio. Certified Deaf Interpreters work with hearing ASL interpreters, for whom ASL is a second language, to ensure translation is reformulated in ways Deaf will be able to correctly understand. WKYC said Berkowitz "made Ohio history as (the) first Deaf person to interpret for the Deaf community".

Berkowitz was the first member of Hadassah's National Center for the Jewish Deaf. In 2008 she was the president of the Jewish Deaf Congress.

She wrote Deaf and Hearing Siblings in Conversation with Judith Jonas.

Berkowitz became known during the coronavirus pandemic, when working with a team of two hearing ASL interpreters she interpreted Ohio's daily press conferences. A fan club developed on Facebook, and a bobblehead was produced in her likeness. Deaf World Against Violence Everywhere requested permission to use her likeness on a t-shirt. As she gained recognition, she "knew there would be ignorant comments such as, 'Why is she making those big facial expressions?' and 'She's so distracting'", and that she would have to explain. Berkowitz told The Lantern: "facial expressions are a crucial part of the language and serve as grammar markers to indicate whether a speaker is asking a question or making a statement. Interpreters must also convey if a speaker is being authoritative or calming, which speakers express with vocal inflections".

== Personal life ==
Berkowitz lived in Manhattan for fifteen years. She moved to Ohio after marrying Charisse Heine. The couple lives in Columbus. Berkowitz considers herself a sumain, which she describes as "a coined word from two languages - Su - your; main - hands", indicating people who communicate with each other using their hands.
