= Washington School for the Deaf =

Public school in Vancouver, Washington, US

Coordinates: 45.625°N 122.640°W

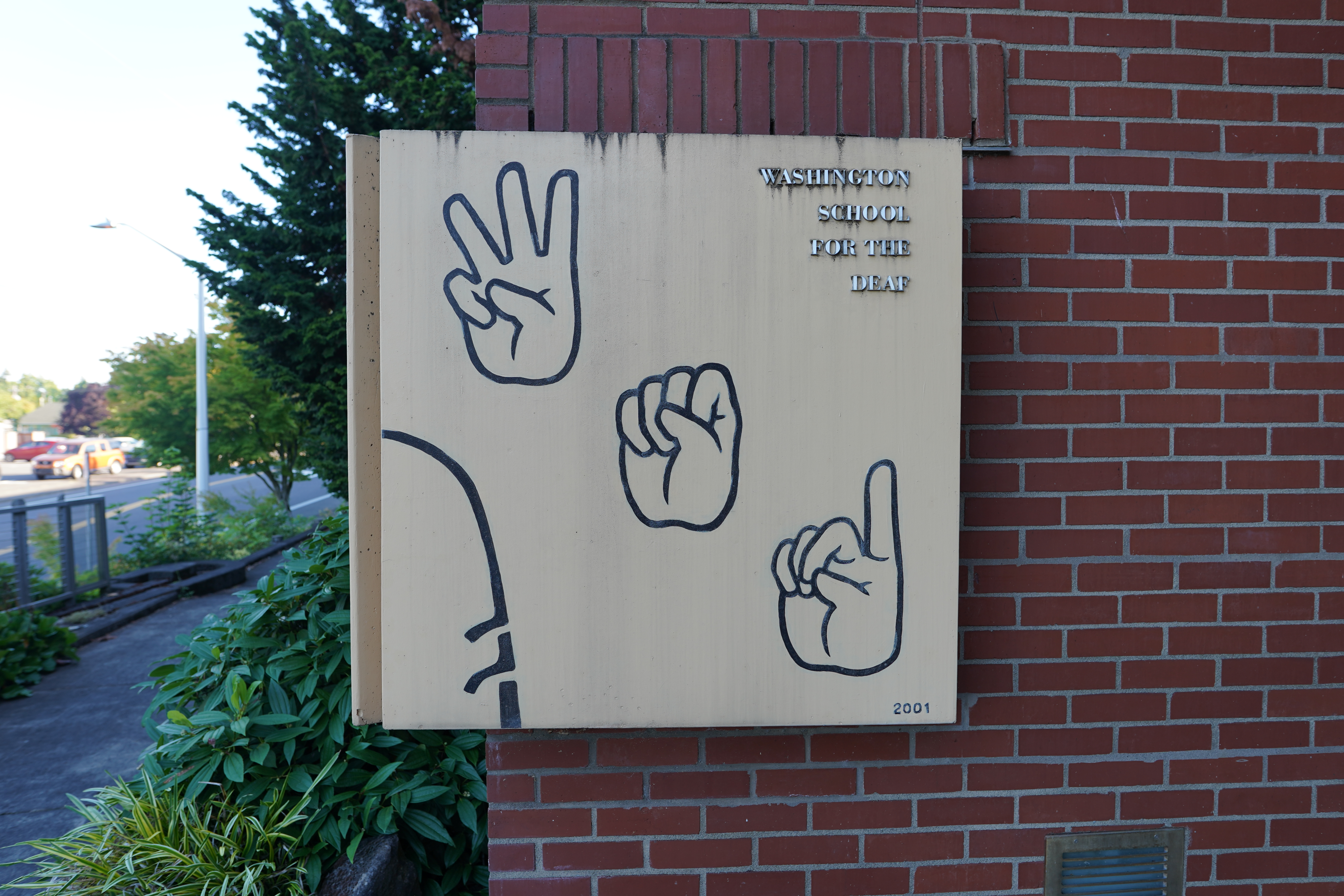
- Entrance mural

Location
- 611 Grand Blvd. Vancouver, Washington; United States

Information
- Type: Public
- Established: February 3, 1886
- Superintendent: Shauna Bilyeu
- Faculty: 100+
- Grades: K–12
- Enrollment: 110+
- Colors: Kelly Green, Black, and White
- Athletics conference: WIAA; Columbia Valley League
- Mascot: Terriers
- Affiliation: CEASD
- Website: www.wsd.wa.gov

The Washington School for the Deaf (WSD) is a school for deaf children located in Vancouver, Washington, in the United States. The school educates children from all over Washington.

== History ==
The Washington Territory Legislature of 1885–86 passed a bill to build the Washington School for Defective Youth. On February 3, 1886, Governor Watson C. Squire, the eleventh territorial governor, signed the bill into law.

The school was split to form the State School for the Blind and the State School for the Deaf in 1913.

== Residency ==
WSD is also a residential school. It has cottages where students reside throughout the week. Students arrive on Sundays and depart on Fridays. Cottages are for students who live far enough not to be able to travel by bus every day to school. There are cottages for male and female students: Preschool, Elementary, Middle School, and High School.

WSD's residential programs offers extracurricular activities, peer interaction, student growth and development, achievement, and more.

== Athletics ==
High School Boys, Six-Man Football, Basketball, Track and Field,

High School Girls, Volleyball, Basketball, & Track and Field

Middle School Boys Soccer & Basketball

Middle School Girls Soccer & Basketball

Elementary Soccer

WIAA State Championships	Year:
Boys Track & Field	1972

Sports	National Deaf Prep Championships
Boys Track & Field	1972 & 1973
Girls Track & Field	2019 & 2022

Western State Basketball & Cheerleader Classic Championships	Year:
Boys	1978, 1979, 1980, 2016, & 2023
Girls	1985, 1992, & 2023
Cheerleaders	1981, 1982, 1983, 1984, 1989, 1990, 1992, 1993, 2006, & 2014
