= Drago Renteria =

Transgender man

Dragonsani "Drago" Renteria
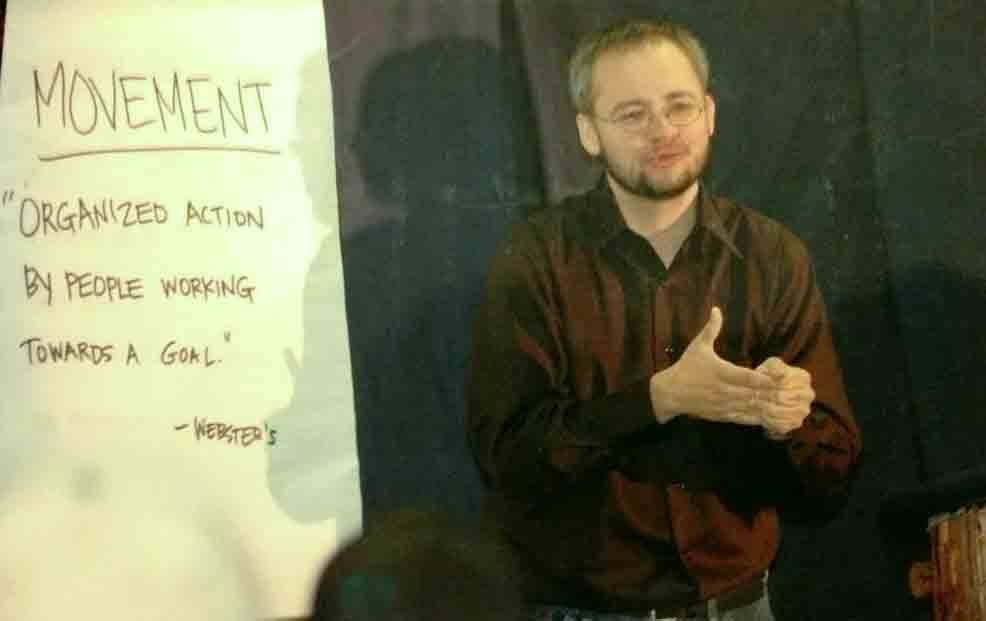
- Renteria giving the keynote speech at the Northwest Rainbow Alliance of the Deaf [NWRAD] Lifestyle Leadership Camp, 2006.
- Born: El Paso, Texas, U.S.

Dragonsani "Drago" Renteria is a Chicano social justice, LGBTQ+ rights activist, community leader, educator, editor, historian, and artist.

He is CEO of DeafVision, founder and executive director of Deaf Queer Resource Center (DQRC) and long-time resident of San Francisco. He spearheaded many DeafQueer advocacy efforts and took charge, in various capacities, of several Deaf LGBT institutions.

== Early life and education ==
Renteria was born in El Paso, Texas. He is of Mexican and Italian heritages and grew up in the Chicano culture. Growing up, his first language was Spanish. He contracted spinal meningitis when he was 11 and, after two days of high fever, became deaf.

He came out as a lesbian in the late 1970s when he was 12 and transitioned from female to male in the late 1990s, one of the first deaf people known to have done so.

He attended Gallaudet University for two years (1986 to 1988) where he was president of the student LGBTQ group, the Lambda Society of Gallaudet University, Chief Justice of the Student Body Government, occupied various positions with the Buff & Blue, the school newspaper, and involved with Hispanos Unidos en Gallaudet, before transferring to the University of California at Berkeley (UCB) and graduating with a bachelor's degree in 1993. He studied at the City College of San Francisco and received certificates in photojournalism and professional portrait photography.

== Career ==
=== Social justice activism ===
At Gallaudet, Renteria first discovered and "understood the power of organizing." He has since been involved in causes related to anti-gentrification and housing rights, particularly those affecting Latinos and other people of color. He has served on the boards of FTM International as president, Transgender Law Center as Disability Advisory Board, Youth Gender Project, Rainbow Alliance of the Deaf, California Center for Law and the Deaf, and The Telecommunications Access for the Deaf and Disabled Administrative Committee as Deaf Community Seat (TADDAC). He has given workshops, presentations and keynote speeches across the country including Asterisk Trans* Conference, Transgender Leadership Summit at the University of California, Berkeley, Deaf Gays and Lesbians of the West Conference, Creating Change Conference, and National Association of the Deaf Conference.

=== Early Entrepreneurship ===
In 1997, Renteria became CEO of DeafVision, one of the first deaf-owned Internet companies. DeafVision, Inc. is a Deaf minority owned and operated web hosting and development company based in San Francisco, California. Many deaf LGBTQ organizations online have their websites hosted on DeafVision, including Trans Ally, Buckeye Rainbow Association of the Deaf, and the Youth Gender Project. He also created the first websites not just for deaf LGBTQ people, but also the very first website for deaf women (Deaf Women Resources), the deaf leather community (Deaf Leather Dungeon), and the deaf Latinx community (Deaf Aztlan).

While working as director of the Deaf Gay and Lesbian Center (DGLC) from 1992 to 1995, a now-defunct outreach program of Deaf Counseling, Advocacy and Referral Agency (DCARA) that had served only deaf LGBTQ in the San Francisco Bay Area, he has mentioned in an interview that his stint there has made him come to a realization that "the people who needed support the very most were deaf LGBTs who did not reside in big cities like San Francisco."

"While working at DGLC, it became evident to me that our community needed services on a national level. At about this time, the Internet was beginning to take off and I realized it could serve as an invaluable tool for providing resources and support nationwide. It could also serve as a tool for empowering our community. I envisioned a virtual community center online."

He is also founder and coordinator of the National Deaf LGBTQ Archives from 1993 to present, editor of DCARA News from 1995 to 1996, director of Deaf Gay & Lesbian Center (DGLC) from 1992 to 1995, and founder, publisher and editor of Coming Together Newsletter (CTN) from 1991 to 1995.

=== Deaf Queer Resource Center ===
Renteria spearheaded several deaf, especially deaf LGBTQIA, representation efforts online. In 1995, Renteria became and founder and executive director of Deaf Queer Resource Center (DQRC), one of the first Deaf-related websites on the web. While working at the local DGLC in San Francisco, he envisioned the need for a similar organization that operated on a national level to serve deaf LGBTQIA people in different states. The DQRC was launched on September 1, 1995, and was the first website for the Deaf community focused on LGBTQ. Since then, the DQRC has become a 501(c)(3) nonprofit that provides "peer support, support groups, information and referrals, educational workshops, work to increase visibility, educate on accessibility and we also work to preserve Deaf LGBTQ history"

During the COVID-19 pandemic, the DQRC provided accessible information and hosted regular events for the Deaf community. The DQRC averages over 15,000 monthly visits and provides resources on other social media platforms including Facebook and Instagram. Renteria continues to create videos for the National Deaf LGBTQ Archives, which are published on the DQRC's Facebook page in order to preserve historic videos of the Deaf LGBT community.

Through the DQRC, Renteria initiated National Deaf LGBTQ Awareness Week in 2018 in hopes of having Deaf schools implement it to empower Deaf LGBT youth. The National Deaf LGBTQ Awareness Week take place annually in April.

=== Photography and Photojournalism ===
He has been a photojournalist for El Tecolote, the Mission Districts English and Spanish newspaper since 2015. He covers issues that affect Latinx and other people of color in the Mission District. His significant published works involve documentation of evidence of gentrification in the San Francisco Bay Area and through photography and silent documentary.

He has presented on his work at the National Technical Institute of the Deaf in 2017, been featured as an artist in the Bay Area Deaf Arts exhibit, Stonewall 50 Years Anniversary Art Exhibit, and has curated art exhibits at the Dyer Arts Center.

== Personal life ==
Renteria has lived in the San Francisco Bay Area since 1989 and in the Mission since 1999. He lives with his long-time partner, Jennifer Mantle, a freelance ASL interpreter, priestess, and minister of herchurch, and their service dog, Magnus, a Schnoodle.

== Publications and mentions ==
Renteria has been mentioned and quoted in several publications, most recently in Innovations in Deaf Studies: The Role of Deaf Scholars (edited by Annelies Kusters, Maartje De Meulder, and Dai O'Brien):

"Hearing queer historians and Deaf straight historians have often deemed us unworthy of inclusion in their history books." In addition, he saw "virtually no published literature produced by Deaf LGBTQ People of Color." [...] "After realizing that both Deaf history books and LGBTQ history books were not documenting our history, I made a commitment to begin doing so."

The 1993 anthology Eyes of Desire: A Deaf Gay & Lesbian Reader includes a poem by Renteria. Other publications where he is noted include J. Harrison Fitch's Out's Gay & Lesbian Guide to the Web (1997), Stephanie Brill and Rachel Pepper's The Transgender Child: A Handbook for Families and Professionals (2008), and Lee Harrington's Traversing Gender: Understanding Transgender Realities (2016).

== Selected awards and honours ==
- 2019 Changemakers, Disability Changemakers
- Laurent Clerc Award, Gallaudet University, 2018
- Trailblazer Award, DeafHope, 2015
- 41 Latin@ LGBTQ role models, 2015
- Honorary Grand Marshall, Seattle LGBT Pride, 2006
- Appreciation Award, Rainbow Alliance of the Deaf, 2005
- DCARA Hal Ramger Distinguish Service Award, 2003
- Appreciation Award, Rainbow Alliance of the Deaf, 2003
- LGBT Local Hero Award, KQED San Francisco, 2002
- Community Service Award, San Francisco Board of Supervisors, 2002
- Appreciation Award, California State Assembly, 2002
- Woman of the Year Award, Rainbow Alliance of the Deaf, 2001
- Deaf Queer Role Model, Youth Advocates, 2000
- Leadership Award, Rainbow Lambda Society of the Deaf, 1999
- Baltimore Leather Association of the Deaf Life Brother Emeritus, 1998
- Grand Marshall, San Francisco Freedom Day Parade, 1995
- Special Recognition Award, San Francisco Board of Supervisors, 1993
- Leadership Award, Lambda Society of Gallaudet University, 1987

=== The Drago Renteria Commitment to the LGBTQA Community Award ===
Every year, the LGBTQA Resource Center at Gallaudet University hosts the Lavender Graduation ceremony where graduating students who identify as part of the LGBTQIA community, advocates, allies, and role models are awarded for recognition of their efforts and contributions to promotion of equity, diversity, and inclusion for LGBTQIA-identified members on campus. The Drago Renteria Commitment to the LGBTQA Community Award is "the highest honor [...] awarded to an undergraduate or graduate student, typically a member of the graduating class, who has performed extraordinary service and outstanding leadership in helping to strengthen the LGBTQA+ community by encouraging awareness and understanding around LGBTQA+ issues and identities at Gallaudet University and in the wider Deaf community."
