= 2018 El Paso, Texas elections =

El Paso, Texas elections, 2018
- November 6, 2018
County Judge before election
Veronica Escobar
Democratic
Elected County Judge
TBD

On November 6, 2018, El Paso County elected a new member of the House of Representatives of the United States, a new county judge, two county commissioners, five state representatives, and four city council members.

The national, state and county elections are partisan, and the city council election is non-partisan (there is no primary election for the city, but if no candidate wins a majority there will be a run-off election). The city and county officials elected will serve four-year terms, and the state representatives and Congressperson will serve two-year terms.

There were several open races, as the incumbent member of Congress, Beto O'Rourke, a Democrat, unsuccessfully ran for the Senate against Ted Cruz, and the incumbent county judge, Veronica Escobar, ran successfully for O'Rourke's seat in the House of Representatives. Incumbent county commissioners David Stout (Precinct 2), a Democrat, and Andrew Haggerty (Precinct 4), a Republican, ran for re-election. Stout was re-elected, and Haggerty was defeated by former city council member Carl Robinson. The five state representatives (all Democrats), Cesar Blanco, Mary Gonzalez, Joe Moody, Lina Ortega, and Joe Pickett, were re-elected.

City council districts 1, 5, 6, and 8 had elections in 2018. Michiel Noe, District 5 incumbent, was term-limited and could not run again. District 1 incumbent, Peter Svarzbein; District 6 incumbent, Claudia Ordaz; and Cissy Lizarraga, District 8 incumbent, were re-elected.

== County Judge election ==
=== Democratic Party ===
==== Candidates ====
- John Cook, former mayor of El Paso (2005–2013)
- Laura Enriquez, personal injury lawyer
- Ricardo Samaniego, business owner, University of Phoenix instructor, and former juvenile probation officer

==== Declined candidates ====
- Veronica Escobar, former county judge (2011–2017)
- Andrew Haggerty, county commissioner
- Vince Perez, county commissioner

=== Democratic Party primary results ===
El Paso County Judge Democratic primary results, 2018
Party	Candidate	Votes	%
Democratic			
Democratic			
Total votes			

=== Republican Party primary results ===
El Paso County Judge Republican primary results, 2018
Party	Candidate	Votes	%
Republican			
Republican			
Total votes			

=== General election results ===
El Paso County Judge election results, 2018
Party	Candidate	Votes	%
Democratic			
Republican			
Total votes			

== County Commissioner, precinct 2 election ==
=== Democratic Party ===
==== Nominee ====
- David Stout, incumbent county commissioner

==== Primary candidates ====
- Sergio Lewis, former county commissioner

=== Democratic Party primary results ===
El Paso County Commissioner Democratic primary results, 2018
Party	Candidate	Votes	%
Democratic			
Democratic			
Total votes			

=== Republican Party primary results ===
El Paso County Commissioner Republican primary results, 2018
Party	Candidate	Votes	%
Republican			
Republican			
Total votes			

=== General election results ===
El Paso County Commissioner election results, 2018
Party	Candidate	Votes	%
Democratic			
Republican			
Total votes			

== County Commissioner, precinct 4 election ==
=== Republican Party ===
==== Nominee ====
- Andrew Haggerty, incumbent county commissioner

=== Democratic Party ===
==== Nominee ====
- Carl Robinson, former city council member

=== Democratic Party primary results ===
El Paso County Commissioner Democratic primary results, 2018
Party	Candidate	Votes	%
Democratic			
Democratic			
Total votes			

=== Republican Party primary results ===
El Paso County Commissioner Republican primary results, 2018
Party	Candidate	Votes	%
Republican			
Republican			
Total votes			

=== General election results ===
El Paso County Commissioner election results, 2018
Party	Candidate	Votes	%
Democratic			
Republican			
Total votes			

== City council election ==
=== District 1 ===
==== Candidates ====
- Richard Bonart, dentist
- Carlos Corral, filmmaker
- Veronica Frescas, non-profit employee
- Peter Svarzbein, incumbent

==== First round results ====
El Paso District 1 election results, 2018
Party	Candidate	Votes	%
Nonpartisan			
Nonpartisan			
Total votes			

=== District 5 ===
==== Candidates ====
- Kizito Ezechukwu, auditor
- John Hogan, self-employed
- Benjamin Miranda
- Jason Osborne, security consultant
- Isabel Salcido, self-employed

==== Results ====
El Paso District 5 election results, 2018
Party	Candidate	Votes	%
Nonpartisan			
Nonpartisan			
Total votes			

=== District 6 ===
==== Candidates ====
- Claudia Ordaz, incumbent
- George Stoltzt

==== Results ====
El Paso District 6 election results, 2018
Party	Candidate	Votes	%
Nonpartisan			
Nonpartisan			
Total votes			

=== District 8 ===
==== Candidates ====
- Gregory Baine, U.S. Army veteran
- Dylan Corbett, non-profit executive
- Cissy Lizarraga, incumbent
- Nicholas Vasquez
- Rich Wright, blogger

==== Results ====
El Paso District 8 election results, 2018
Party	Candidate	Votes	%
Nonpartisan			
Nonpartisan			
Total votes			

== State representative, District 75 election ==
=== Democratic Party ===
==== Candidates ====
- MarySue Femath, family counselor at the Ysleta Del Sur Pueblo reservation
- Mary Gonzalez, incumbent representative

=== Democratic Party primary results ===
District 75 state representative Democratic primary results, 2018
Party	Candidate	Votes	%
Democratic			
Democratic			
Total votes			

=== Republican Party primary results ===
District 75 state representative Republican primary results, 2018
Party	Candidate	Votes	%
Republican			
Republican			
Total votes			

=== General election results ===
District 75 state representative election results, 2018
Party	Candidate	Votes	%
Democratic			
Republican			
Total votes			

== State representative, District 76 election ==
=== Candidates ===
- Cesar Blanco, incumbent state representative

=== Democratic Party primary results ===
District 76 state representative Democratic primary results, 2018
Party	Candidate	Votes	%
Democratic			
Democratic			
Total votes			

=== Republican Party primary results ===
District 76 state representative Republican primary results, 2018
Party	Candidate	Votes	%
Republican			
Republican			
Total votes			

=== General election results ===
District 76 state representative election results, 2018
Party	Candidate	Votes	%
Democratic			
Republican			
Total votes			

== State representative, District 77 election ==
=== Democratic Party primary results ===
District 77 state representative Democratic primary results, 2018
Party	Candidate	Votes	%
Democratic			
Democratic			
Total votes			

=== Republican Party primary results ===
District 77 state representative Republican primary results, 2018
Party	Candidate	Votes	%
Republican			
Republican			
Total votes			

=== General election results ===
District 77 state representative election results, 2018
Party	Candidate	Votes	%
Democratic			
Republican			
Total votes			

== State representative, District 78 election ==
=== Democratic Party primary results ===
District 78 state representative Democratic primary results, 2018
Party	Candidate	Votes	%
Democratic			
Democratic			
Total votes			

=== Republican Party primary results ===
District 78 state representative Republican primary results, 2018
Party	Candidate	Votes	%
Republican			
Republican			
Total votes			

=== General election results ===
District 78 state representative election results, 2018
Party	Candidate	Votes	%
Democratic			
Republican			
Total votes			

== State representative, District 79 election ==
=== Democratic Party primary results ===
District 79 state representative Democratic primary results, 2018
Party	Candidate	Votes	%
Democratic			
Democratic			
Total votes			

=== Republican Party primary results ===
District 79 state representative Republican primary results, 2018
Party	Candidate	Votes	%
Republican			
Republican			
Total votes			

=== General election results ===
District 79 state representative election results, 2018
Party	Candidate	Votes	%
Democratic			
Republican			
Total votes			

== Member of Congress, 16th Congressional district of Texas election ==
=== Democratic Party ===
==== Nominee ====
- Veronica Escobar, former El Paso County judge

==== Primary candidates ====
- John Carillo, director of development at KTEP (88.5 FM)
- Norma Chavez, former state representative
- Dori Fenenbock, former EPISD school board president
- Enrique Garcia, immigration lawyer
- Nicole LeClaire, Navy veteran and Cypress Creek high school teacher
- Jerome Tilghman, Army veteran and Canyon Hills Middle School teacher

==== Declined candidates ====
- Cesar Blanco, state representative
- Beto O'Rourke, incumbent congressman

=== Republican Party ===
==== Nominee ====
- Rick Seeberger

==== Primary candidates ====
- Alia Garcia-Ureste, businesswoman

=== Independent ===
==== Potential candidates ====
- Jessica Kludt Allala, lawyer

=== Democratic Party primary results ===
District 16 Democratic primary results, 2018
Party	Candidate	Votes	%
Democratic			
Democratic			
Total votes			

=== Republican Party primary results ===
District 16 Republican primary results, 2018
Party	Candidate	Votes	%
Republican			
Republican			
Total votes			

=== General election results ===
District 16 election results, 2018
Party	Candidate	Votes	%
Democratic			
Republican			
Total votes			
