= Deaf culture =

An introduction to Deaf culture in American Sign Language (ASL, English subtitles available)

Deaf culture encompasses the social beliefs, behaviors, arts, traditions, history, values, and institutions of communities that are shaped by shared experiences of deafness and in which sign languages are the main means of communication. When used as a cultural label, the word Deaf is often written with a capital D to distinguish it from the audiological condition, which is typically written with a lowercase d. Carl G. Croneberg discussed analogies between Deaf and hearing cultures in appendices C and D of the 1965 Dictionary of American Sign Language.

== Background ==
Members of various Deaf communities worldwide tend to view Deafness as a difference in human experience rather than a disability or disease. Many members take pride in their Deaf identity. Deaf people, in the sense of a community or culture, can then be seen as a linguistic minority, and therefore some who are a part of this community may feel misunderstood by those who do not know sign language. Another struggle that the Deaf community often faces is that educational institutions usually consist primarily of hearing people and do not accommodate them. Additionally, hearing family members may need to learn sign language in order for the deaf person to feel included and supported. Unlike some other cultures, a Deaf person may join the community later in life, rather than needing to be born into it.

Three views on Deaf people (ASL, English subtitles available)

There are several perspectives on Deaf people and Deaf culture that shape their treatment and role in society. From a medical standpoint, many encourage Deaf children to undergo surgery. In the past, the medical perspective discouraged the use of sign language because they believed it will detract from the development of auditory and speech skills. Although this assumption has since been disproven (the use of sign language has been discovered to play a crucial role in the acquisition of these skills), many audiologists and doctors mistakenly believe it to be true. From a social standpoint, Deaf individuals are welcomed to participate in society in the same manner as any other individual. This view discourages the idea that those who are Deaf or hard-of-hearing are sick and in need of a cure. The social view also encourages making accommodations for deaf people so that they can fully participate in society. Such accommodations include the use of interpreters or improved closed captioning systems. Some feel the social view fails to recognize the unique qualities of Deaf people and Deaf culture. They believe that this perspective asks Deaf people to fit and find their own way in a predominantly hearing society, instead of recognizing their own abilities and culture. Another perspective is referred to as the cultural-linguistic view. Supporters of Deaf Culture state that this perspective appropriately recognizes Deaf people as a minority culture in the world with their own language and social norms. This standpoint is believed to promote Deaf people's right to collective space within society to pass on their language and culture to future generations.

Being involved in the Deaf community and culturally identifying as Deaf has been shown to significantly contribute to positive self-esteem in Deaf individuals. The community can provide support, easy social interaction, and "refuge from the grinding frustrations of the hearing world." Conversely, deaf individuals who are not a part of the Deaf community may not have the same support in the hearing world, resulting in lower self-esteem. Stereotypes, lack of knowledge, and negative attitudes about Deafness cause widespread discrimination. This could lead to a lower education and economic status for deaf people.

Deaf community (video in ASL with English subtitles available)

The community may include hearing family members of deaf people and sign-language interpreters who identify with Deaf culture. It does not automatically include all people who are deaf or hard-of-hearing. As educator and American Sign Language interpreter Anna Mindess writes, "it is not the extent of hearing loss that defines a member of the deaf community but the individual's own sense of identity and resultant actions." As with all social groups that a person chooses to belong to, a person is a member of the deaf community if they identify and the communities accept them as so.

Deaf culture is recognized under Article 30, Paragraph 4 of the United Nations Convention on the Rights of Persons with Disabilities, which states that "Persons with disabilities shall be entitled, on an equal basis with others, to recognition and support of their specific cultural and linguistic identity, including sign languages and deaf culture."

Deaf culture is as well recognized in the statement presented at the 21st International Conference on Education of the Deaf in 2010 in Vancouver, Canada, where the more than 60 countries that participated in it agreed that "Despite this 'disability mindset,' Deaf citizens positively contribute to societies that embrace diversity and creativity. They enhance their nations in areas of education, economic activity, politics, arts and literature. For Deaf people, it is an inalienable right to be acknowledged as a linguistic and cultural minority integral to every society."

In Deaf culture, "sumain" refers to people who communicate with each other using their hands. Marla Berkowitz, a Certified Deaf ASL interpreter, describes it as "a coined word from two languages – Su – your; main – hands".

== Acculturation ==
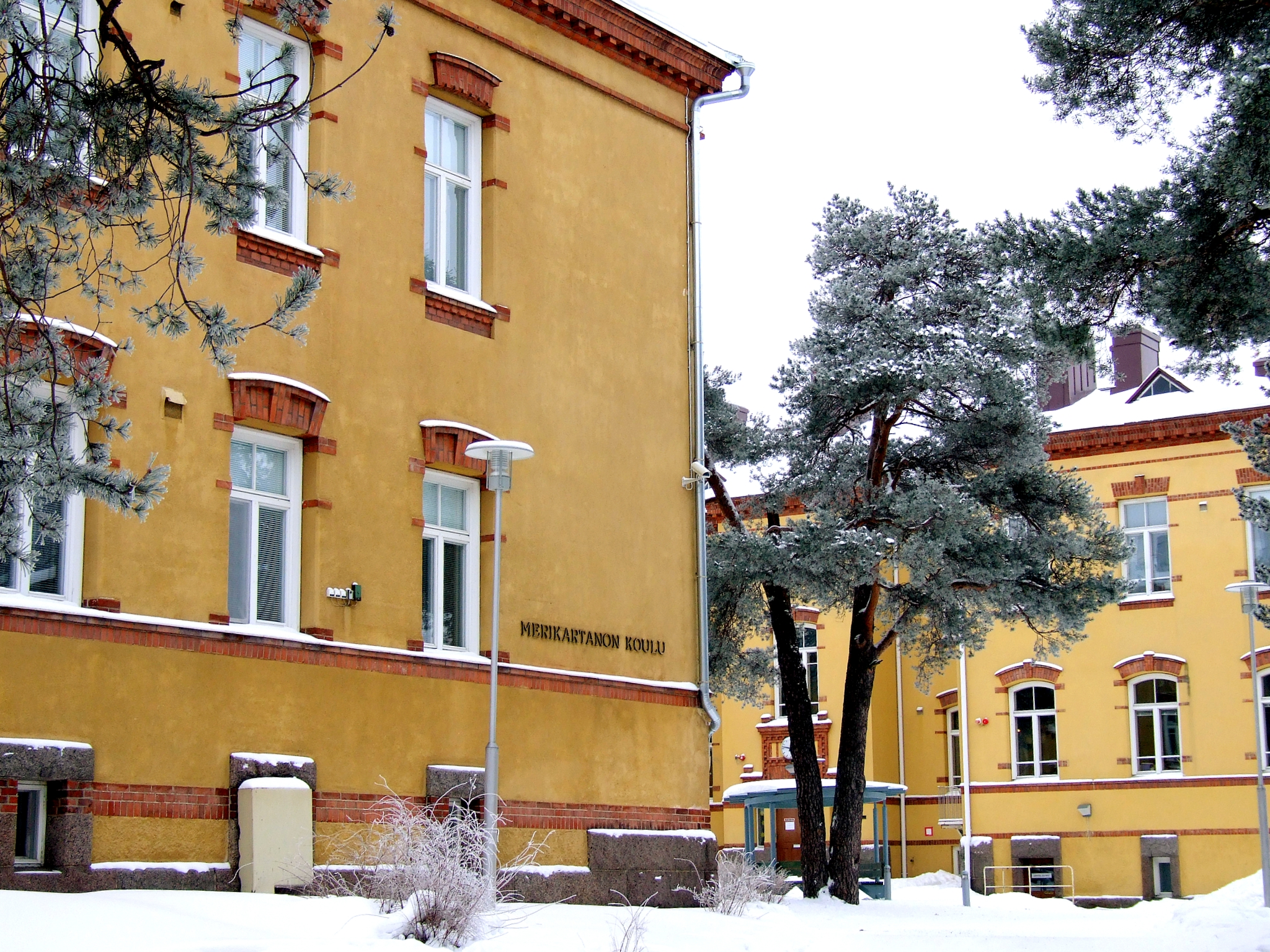
Merikartano school for deaf students in Oulu, Finland (February 2006)

Acquisition of Deaf culture (video in ASL)

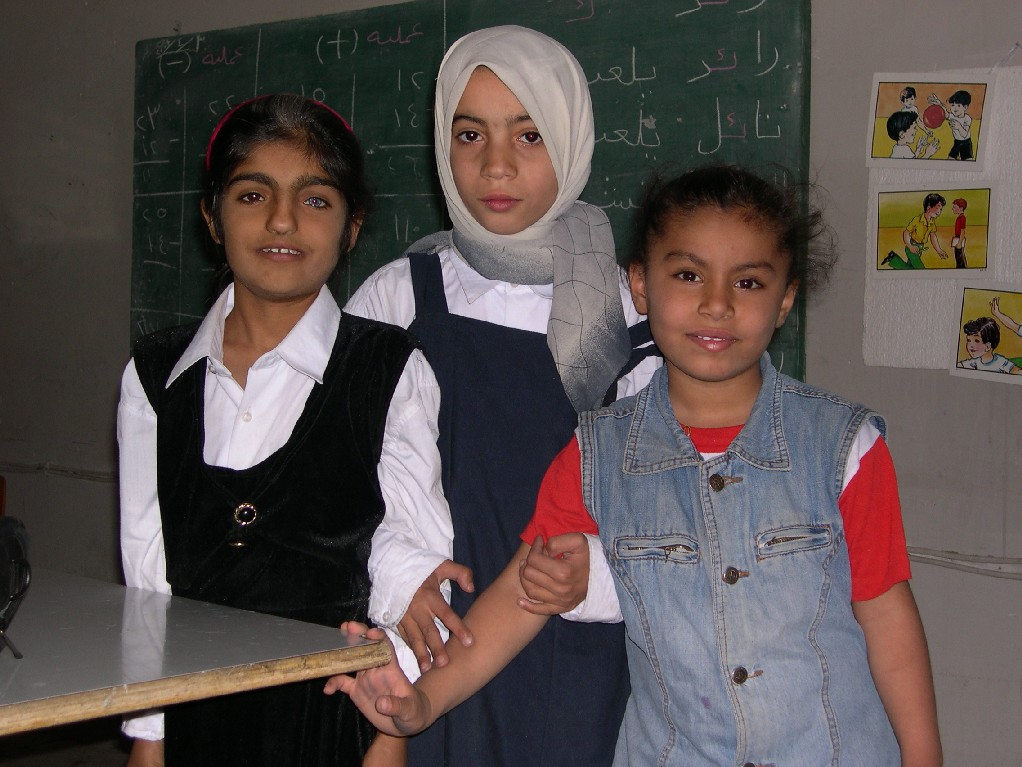
Students at a school for deaf students in Baghdad, Iraq (April 2004)

Historically, acculturation has often occurred within schools for Deaf students and within Deaf social clubs, both of which unite deaf people into communities with which they can identify. Becoming Deaf culturally can occur at different times for different people, depending on the circumstances of one's life. A small proportion of deaf individuals acquire sign language and Deaf culture in infancy from Deaf parents, others acquire it through attendance at schools, and yet others may not be exposed to sign language and Deaf culture until college or a time after that.

Although up to fifty percent of deafness has genetic causes, fewer than five percent of deaf people have a Deaf parent, so Deaf communities are unusual among cultural groups in that most members do not acquire their cultural identities from parents.

=== Diversity ===
Educator and ASL interpreter Anna Mindess notes that there is "not just one homogeneous deaf culture". There are many distinct Deaf communities around the world, which communicate using different sign languages and exhibit different cultural norms. Deaf identity also intersects with other kinds of cultural identity. Deaf culture intersects with nationality, education, race, ethnicity, gender, class, sexual orientation, and other identity markers, leading to a culture that is at once quite small and also tremendously diverse. The extent to which people identify primarily with their deaf identity rather than their membership in other intersecting cultural groups also varies. Professor Anthony J. Aramburo found in a study titled The Sociolinguistic Aspects of the Black Deaf Community (1989) that "87 percent of black Deaf people polled identified with their black culture first". Deaf youth who belong to multiple minority groups face exceptional challenges. Deaf Black individuals may encounter discrimination from both hearing people of the Black community and White Deaf individuals. Though racism is not greater than audism, the intersection of race and deafness (and other identities) can increase the barriers to success and compound hardship. Therefore, it is crucial to acknowledge the intersectionality of Black Deaf students as it plays a significant role in their educational success.

In his central work on Deafhood, English scholar Paddy Ladd often emphasizes a strong sense of collectivity within the Deaf community, but also correctly points out that other forms of marginalization also exist within this community, e.g. towards Deaf people from other countries. Racial discrimination is also noted: Deaf schools in the USA did not admit black students for a long time. The examples mentioned by Ladd also point to tendencies towards gender discrimination. He also points out that his analyses focus strongly on the USA and the UK, and that the situation and self-definition of d/Deaf people in other countries can differ greatly. Like other authors, however, he assumes a common core of a Deaf culture that arises from experiences as a Deaf person(s). Research in Tanzania in the early 21st century resulted in differing analysis whether or not - or how much - the identify of deaf Tanzanians can be characterized as Deaf, pointing also to intersectional identities.

== Education ==
Deaf culture is prevalent in K–12 schools for the deaf throughout the world, though higher education specifically for them is more limited.

Abbé Charles-Michel de l'Épée opened the first school for the deaf in Paris called the Institut National de Jeunes Sourds de Paris (English: National Institute for Deaf Children of Paris) in 1760. The American Thomas Gallaudet witnessed a demonstration of deaf teaching skills from Épée's successor Abbé Sicard and two of the school's deaf faculty members, Laurent Clerc and Jean Massieu; accompanied by Clerc, he returned to the United States, where in 1817 they founded American School for the Deaf in Hartford, Connecticut. American Sign Language (ASL) started to evolve from primarily French Sign Language (LSF), and other outside influences.

In a residential school where all the children use the same communication system (whether it is a school using sign language, Total Communication or Oralism), students will be able to interact "normally" with other students, without having to worry about being criticized. An argument supporting inclusion, on the other hand, exposes the student to people who are not just like them, preparing them for adult life. Through interacting, children with hearing disabilities can expose themselves to other cultures which in the future may be beneficial for them when it comes to finding jobs and living on their own in a society where their disability may put them in the minority. These are some reasons why a person may or may not want to put their child in an inclusion classroom.

=== United States ===
In comparison to the general public, deaf people have lower levels of educational achievement. Advocates in deaf education believe that an improved recognition of American Sign Language (ASL) as an official language would improve education, as well as economic status. Some argue that by improving the recognition of ASL, better access to school materials, Deaf teachers, interpreters, and video-telephone communication would take place.

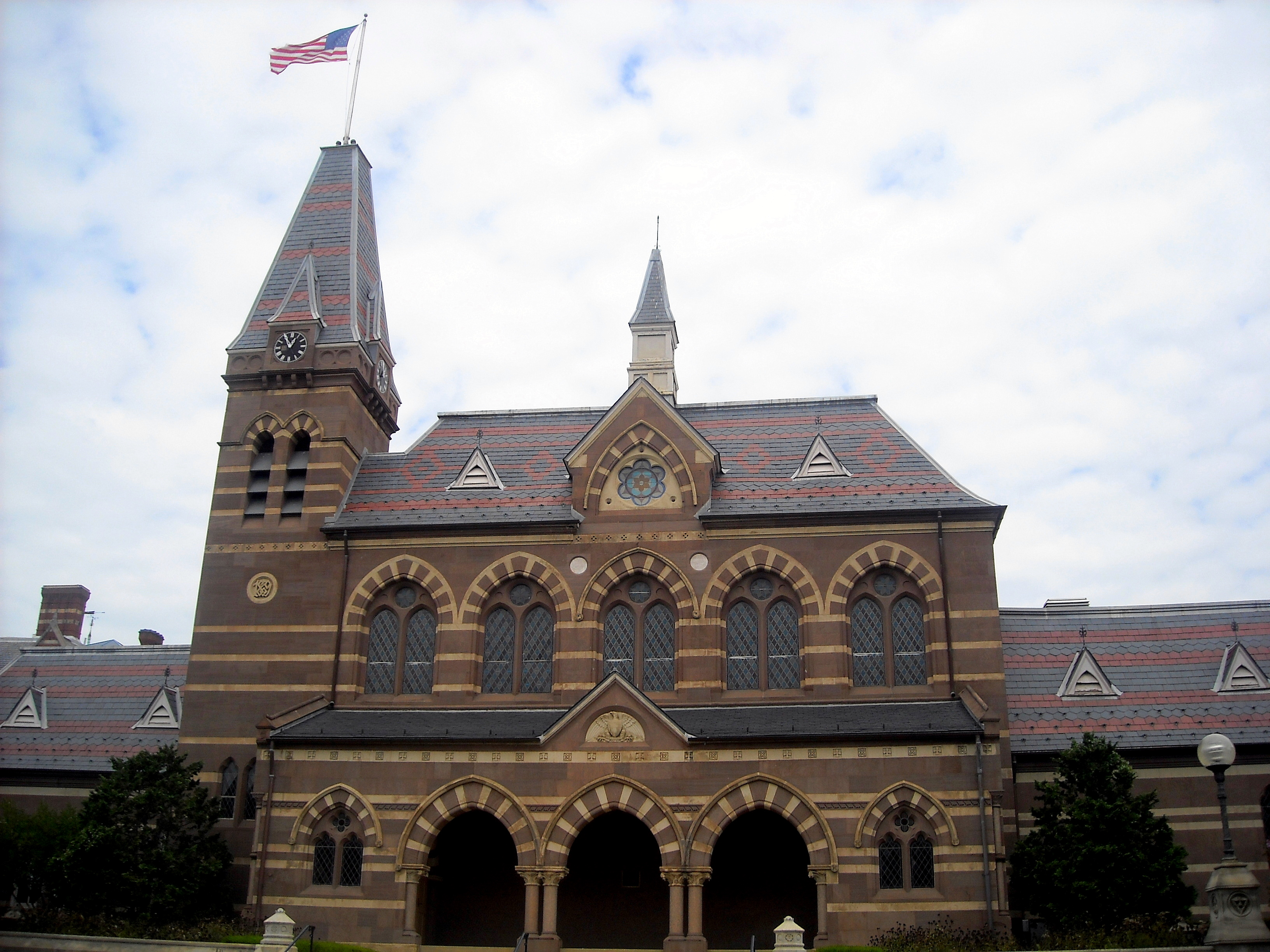
Gallaudet University's Chapel Hall

Often colloquially referred to as the "Big Three" schools for the Deaf in the United States, California State University at Northridge (CSUN), National Technical Institute for the Deaf (part of Rochester Institute of Technology), and Gallaudet University are post-secondary institutions that serve a large population of Deaf students. Gallaudet University is the first and only liberal-arts college for deaf students in the world.

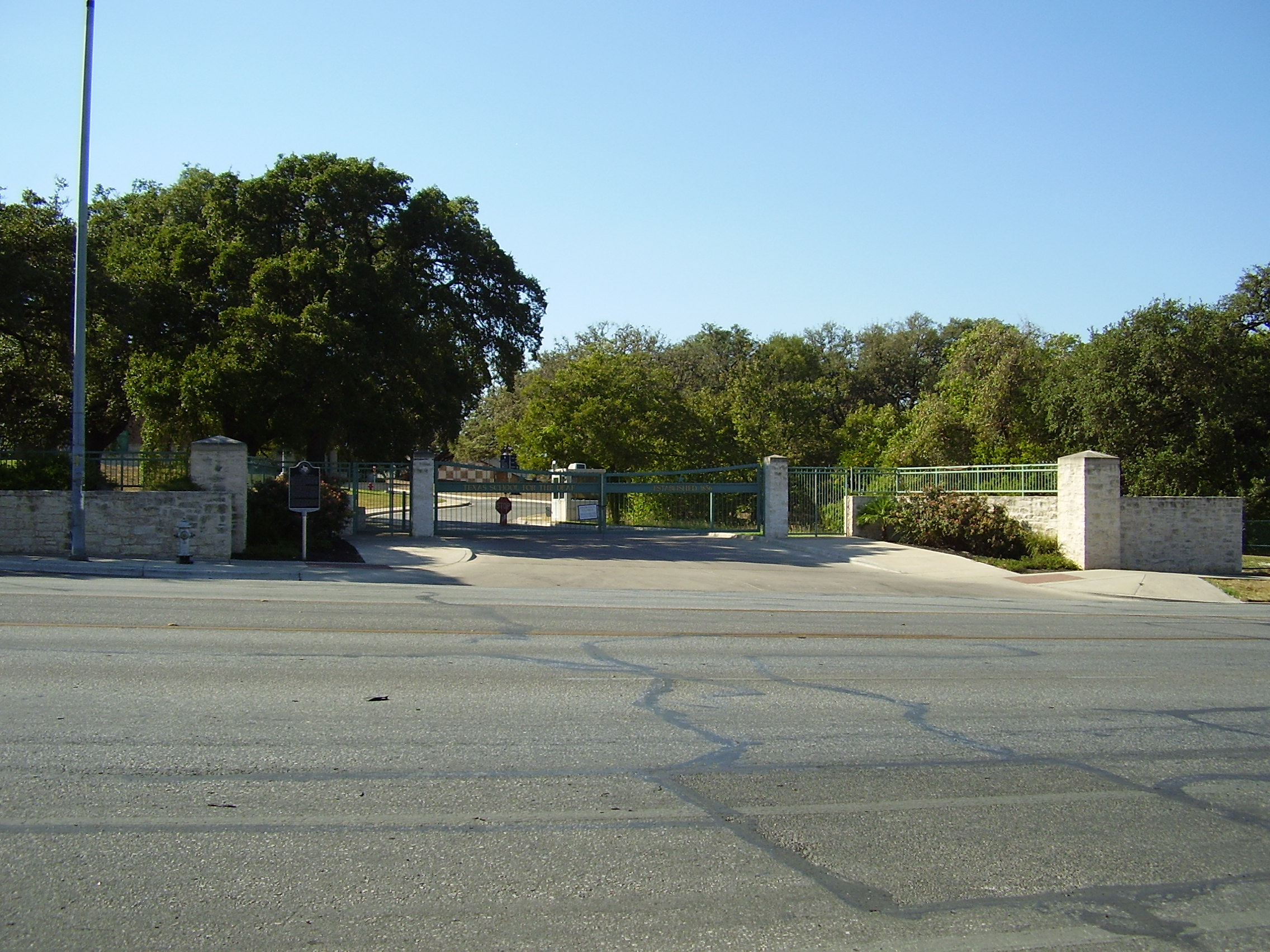
Texas School for the Deaf

Those who are deaf (by either state or federal standards) have access to a free and appropriate public education. If a child does qualify as being deaf or hard of hearing and receives an individualized education plan, the IEP team must consider "the child's language and communication needs. The IEP must include opportunities for direct communication with peers and professionals. It must also include the student's academic level, and finally must include the students full range of needs"

In part, the U.S. Department of Education defines deafness as "a hearing impairment that is so severe that the child is impaired in processing linguistic information through hearing, with or without amplification". Hearing impairment is defined as "an impairment in hearing, whether permanent or fluctuating, that adversely affects a child's educational performance but that is not included under the definition of deafness".

=== Other countries ===
Deaf culture is an active and vital aspect of deaf communities in many countries other than the U.S. and Europe. There are colleges across the globe. Brazil has several institutions, including Instituto Santa Tersinha and Escola para Crianças Surdas Rio Branco. China's Deaf universities include Beijing Union University, Special Education College of Beijing University, and Zhengzhou University. Other notable universities for the Deaf across the globe include Finland School for the Deaf in Finland, Institut National de Jeunes Sourds de Paris in France, and Berlin School for the Deaf in Germany. In India there has been a discussion and fight to add Indian Sign Language to the eighth schedule (The list of official languages in the Indian constitution.)

== Characteristics ==
Sign language is just one part of Deaf culture. Deaf identity is also constructed around specific beliefs, values and art.

=== Sign languages ===
Sign languages are an important part of Deaf culture. The American Sign Language (ASL) alphabet is shown here.

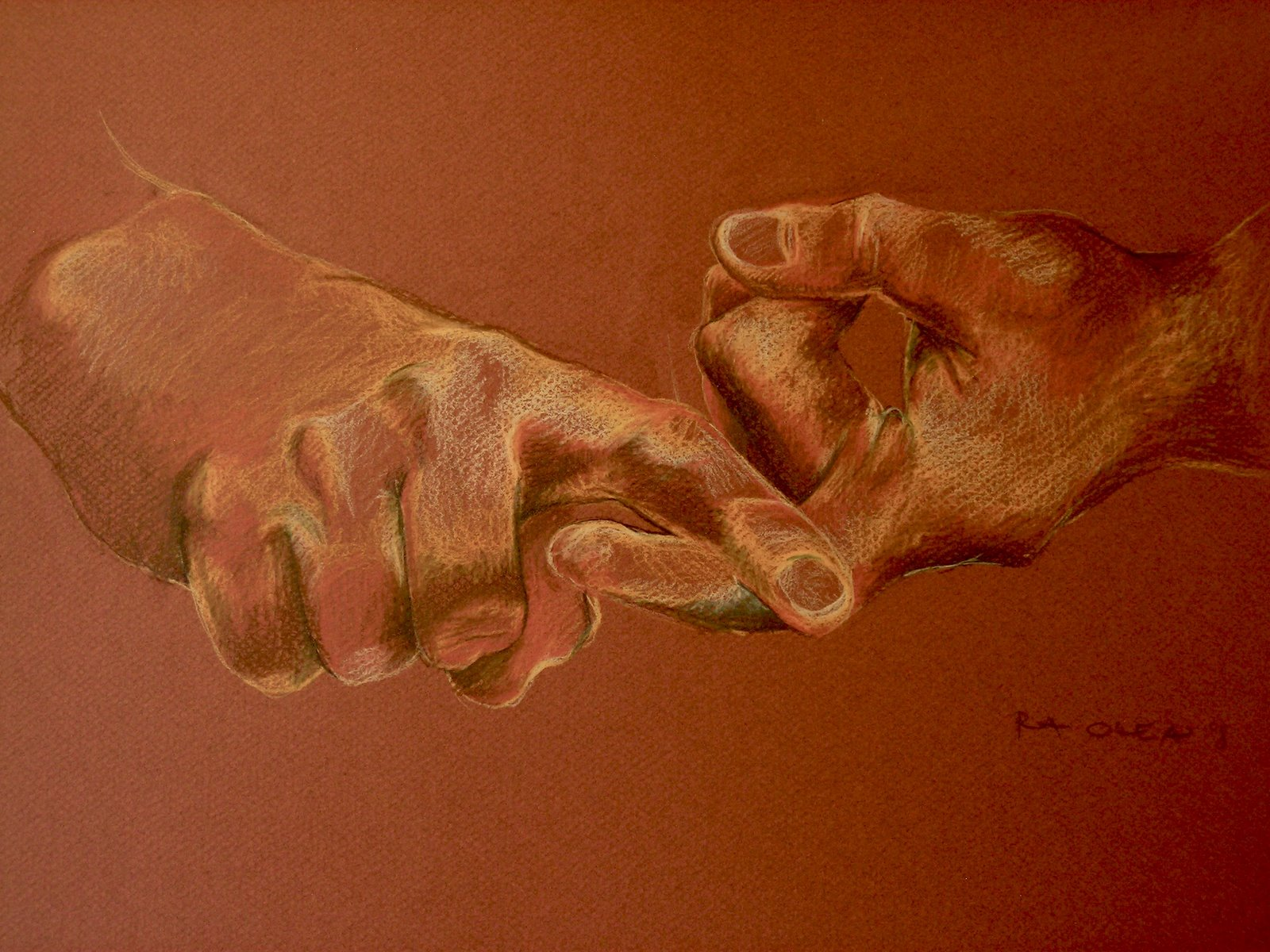
The sign for "friend" in American Sign Language

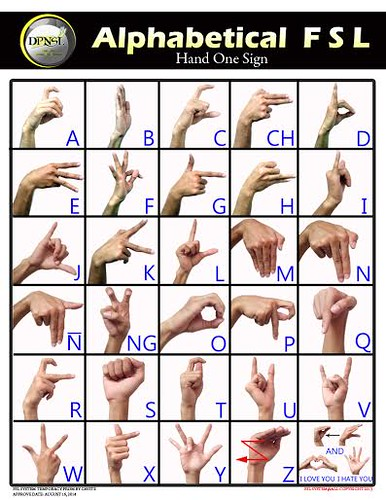
Filipino Sign Language Alphabet

Members of Deaf cultures communicate via sign languages. Sign languages convey meaning through manual communication and body language instead of acoustically conveyed sound patterns. This involves the simultaneous combination of hand shapes, orientation and movement of the hands, arms or body, and facial expressions to express a speaker's thoughts. "Sign languages are based on the idea that vision is the most useful tool a deaf person has to communicate and receive information".

There are over 200 distinct sign languages in the world. These include 114 sign languages listed in the Ethnologue database and 157 more sign languages, systems, and dialects. While the United Kingdom and the United States are both predominantly English speaking, the predominant signed languages used in these countries differ markedly. Due to the origins of deaf education in the United States, American Sign Language is most closely related to French Sign Language.

=== Values and beliefs ===
- A positive attitude toward deafness is typical in Deaf cultural groups. Deafness is not generally considered a condition that needs to be fixed.
- The term "Deaf Gain" is used by Deaf people, to re-frame the perceived losses of Deafness and "hearing loss" to highlight the benefits of being deaf. According to deaf scientist Michele Cooke, it describes the benefits that Deaf people provide the larger community.
- Culturally, Deaf people value the use of natural sign languages that exhibit their own grammatical conventions, such as American Sign Language and British Sign Language, over signed versions of English or other oral languages. Spoken English, written English and signed English are three different symbolic systems for expressing the same language.
- Deaf communities strongly oppose discrimination against deaf people.
- Deaf culture in the United States tends to be collectivist rather than individualist; culturally Deaf people value the group.
- The use of a sign language is central to Deaf cultural identity. Oralist approaches to educating deaf children thereby pose a threat to the continued existence of Deaf culture. Some members of Deaf communities may also oppose technological innovations like cochlear implants for the same reason.

=== Cochlear implants ===
A cochlear implant is not to be mistaken for a hearing aid, which makes noises and sounds louder for the user to hear. Instead, cochlear implants bypass the outer ear and target the inner ear where the auditory nerve fibers are stimulated. To do this, noises and sounds are transformed into electrical energy which is translated as audio information by the nerve which is then sent to the brain. An external microphone captures outside sound, a transmitter processes these sounds and sends them to a receiver embedded under the skin in the skull, and the receiver transforms these sounds into electrical impulses which stimulate the auditory nerve.

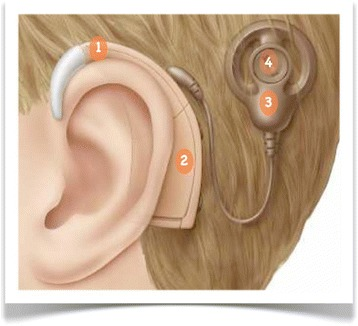
Cochlear Implant: A surgically implanted device used by Deaf and hard-of-hearing individuals to experience representations of sound

The medical model of disability can be aligned with technological advancements in cochlear implants. This is due to the fact that cochlear implants can be perceived to "cure" deafness or fix an individual's hearing, when in reality those who are Deaf may not feel a need to be cured or fixed. This idea is seen in many children's books, where improved quality of life is only seen after characters obtain cochlear implants. This idea that deafness is a physiological issue that resides only within the individual and therefore should be physiologically fixed or solved counters the teachings and beliefs within Deaf culture. Often people feel as though children should make the decision if they want a cochlear implant for themselves as opposed to someone else, like their parents or caregivers, making it for them. Although ethical, this idea poses a problem since the success rate of cochlear implants is at its highest when implanted at early childhood; in other words, when the child is not able to make rather large decisions, like this one, for themselves. These critics argue forcing cochlear implants on children should be reduced and the assumption that cochlear implants offer the best quality of life for Deaf individuals should be countered. One way of doing this would be to expose children of young ages to Deaf culture and the Deaf community early on, as well as teach them Sign Language.

Cochlear implants have been controversial around the Deaf community ever since they first were made available to the public. Those who oppose cochlear implants even refer to it as "cultural genocide," as it lessens the prevalence and importance of Deaf culture. People are against cochlear implants for a variety of reasons, including: there is value to being Deaf, being Deaf is not an illness and does not require a cure, the Deaf are not lesser than the hearing, etc. Cochlear implants also have a variety of risks associated with them, like costliness, effectiveness, and surgical requirement. Alternative solutions proposed by cochlear opponents are centered around the social model of disability, where instead of fixing the actual hearing of the individual, reform and accommodations can be made in society, education, and more to better allow the individual to be integrated into society as would any other.

Alternatively, those who support cochlear implants do not necessarily oppose Deaf culture. Culture itself is not a simple concept, but rather it has high levels of complexity and power; due to this nature, culture is not to be applied narrowly to a group of individuals. The Deaf community is composed of highly diverse Deaf individuals, and to impose narrow culture onto a group full of heterogeneous members would be rather questionable. There is room for deviation and hybridization of values and beliefs in Deaf culture as society and technology evolves. Even if they are proud of their Deaf identity, many deaf individuals wish they knew what their voices sounded like, and wish they could pick up the phone and have a conversation with ease without the need for a third-party device or interpreter. So, instead of looking at cochlear implants as identity stripping, many Deaf parents of Deaf children see cochlear implants as a way to give their children more than what they have; to offer them the pleasure of being able to hear. It has also been proven that cochlear implants help to provide opportunities for success, and help individuals to feel more connected to the world. Though most Deaf individuals agree that choosing to use a cochlear implant is a difficult decision, many say that resistance to cochlear implants has decreased since 1990, the year when it was first approved for children. By building more evidence of the benefits and limitations of cochlear implants, both Deaf and hearing individuals can be properly educated on the impact of cochlear implants, and thus unrealistic expectations and controversies can be resolved.

=== Behavioral patterns ===
- Culturally Deaf people have rules of etiquette for getting attention, walking through signed conversations, leave-taking, and otherwise politely negotiating a signing environment.
- Deaf people also keep each other informed of what is going on in one's environment. It is common to provide detailed information when leaving early or arriving late; withholding such information may be considered rude.
- Deaf people may be more direct or blunt than their hearing counterparts.
- When giving introductions, Deaf people typically try to find common ground; since the Deaf community is relatively small, Deaf people usually have other Deaf people in common.
- Deaf people may also consider time differently. Showing up early to large-scale events, such as lectures, is typical. This may be motivated by the need to get a seat that provides the best visual clarity for the Deaf person.

=== Importance of technology ===
- Like all other people, Deaf individuals rely on technology for communication significantly. In the United States, video relay services and an array of freestanding and software-driven video phones are often used by deaf people to conduct telephonic communication with hearing and deaf businesses, family and friends. Devices such as the teletype (known as a TTY, an electronic device used for communication over a telephone line) are far less common, but are used by some deaf people who are without access to high-speed Internet or have a preference for these methods for their telephonic communication.
- Technology is even important in face-to-face social situations. For example, when deaf people meet a hearing person who does not know sign language, they often communicate via the notepad on their cell phones. Here, technology takes the place of a human sense, allowing deaf individuals to successfully communicate with different cultures.
- Social media tends to be of great importance to deaf individuals. Networking sites allow deaf people to find each other and to remain in contact. Many deaf people have deaf friends throughout the entire country that they met or maintain contact with through online communities. Because of the relatively small size of the deaf community, compared to other communities, the stigma of meeting others online does not exist.
- Closed Captioning must be available on a television in order for a deaf person to fully appreciate the audio portion of the broadcast. Conflicts arise when establishments such as restaurants, airlines, or fitness centers fail to accommodate deaf people by turning on Closed Captioning. Movie theaters are increasingly compliant with providing visual access to first-run movies through stand-alone devices, glasses and open caption technology which allow deaf people to attend movies as they are released.
- Alert systems such as fire alarms and alarm clocks must appeal to different senses in order for a deaf individual to notice the alert. Objects such as vibrating pillows and flashing lights often take the place of the noise-based alarms.
- Lack of understanding about technological accessibility for the deaf causes conflict and injustice for the deaf community. For example, a significant number of deaf individuals in the UK admit that they are dissatisfied with their banks because of their heavy reliance on telephone banking and lack of assistance to deaf and hard-of-hearing individuals.
- Architecture that is conducive to signed communication minimizes visual obstructions and may include such things as automatic sliding doors to free up the hands for continuous conversation.

=== Literary traditions and the arts ===
A strong tradition of poetry and storytelling exists in American Sign Language and other sign languages. Some prominent performers in the United States include Clayton Valli, Ben Bahan, Ella Mae Lentz, Manny Hernandez, CJ Jones, Debbie Rennie, Patrick Graybill, Peter Cook, and many others. Their works are now increasingly available on video.

Literacy traditions and arts (video in ASL)

Culturally Deaf people have also represented themselves in the dominant written languages of their nations.

Deaf artists such as Betty G. Miller and Chuck Baird have produced visual artwork that conveys a Deaf worldview. Douglas Tilden was a famous Deaf sculptor who produced many different sculptures in his lifetime. Some Deaf artists belong to an art movement called De'VIA, which stands for Deaf View Image Art.

Organizations such as the Deaf Professional Arts Network or D-PAN are dedicated to promoting professional development and access to the entertainment, visual and media arts fields for individuals who are deaf or hard-of-hearing.

Daily Moth was established by Alex Abenchuchan in 2017 to make the news accessible for Deaf ASL users.

=== History ===
In the United States, the Cobbs School, a deaf school in Virginia, was established in 1815. This school lasted only one and half years due to financial setbacks. American Deaf Community recounts the story of Laurent Clerc, a deaf educator, coming to the United States from France in 1817 to help found the first permanent school for deaf children in the country now named American School for the Deaf in Hartford, Connecticut. American School is the first official school for the deaf.

Another well-known event is the 1880 Second International Congress on Education of the Deaf in Milan, Italy, where hearing educators voted to embrace oral education and remove sign language from the classroom. This effort resulted in pressure around the world to abandon sign language in favor of the oral approach exclusively. The intent of the oralist method was to teach deaf children to speak and lip read with limited or no use of sign language in the classroom in order to make it easier for deaf children to integrate into hearing communities, but the benefits of learning in such an environment are disputed. The Milan conference recommendations were repudiated in Hamburg a century later, and sign languages in education came back into vogue after the publication of Stokoe's linguistic analyses of ASL.

=== Shared institutions ===
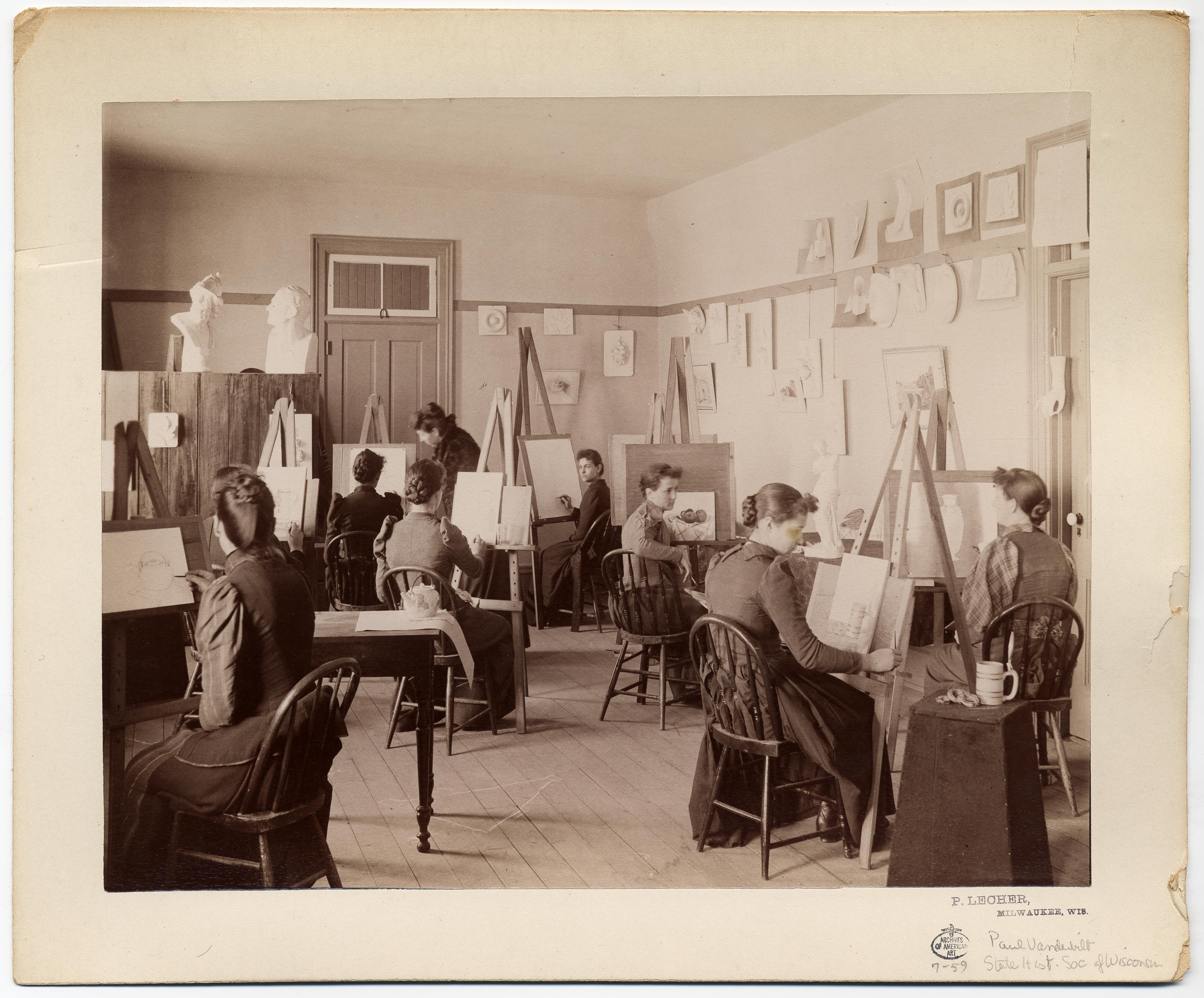
Women's art class at State School of the Deaf, Delavan, Wisconsin, c. 1880

Deaf culture revolves around such institutions as residential schools for deaf students, universities for deaf students (including Gallaudet University and the National Technical Institute for the Deaf), deaf clubs, deaf athletic leagues, communal homes (such as The Home for Aged and Infirm Deaf-Mutes, founded by Jane Middleton, in New York City), deaf social organizations (such as the Deaf Professional Happy Hour), deaf religious groups, deaf theaters, and an array of conferences and festivals, such as the Deaf Way II Conference and Festival and the World Federation of the Deaf conferences.

Deaf clubs, popular in the 1940s and 1950s, were also an important part of deaf culture. During this time there were very few places that deaf people could call their own– places run by deaf people for deaf people. Films were made from the Los Angeles Club for the Deaf and included styles of performances such as Vaudeville show and short comedy skills. These films survived through the 1940s. Wolf Bragg, a popular Deaf club performer through 1930 is known for interpreting sign language into "The Monkey's Paw" and "Auf Wiedersehen". Deaf clubs were the solution to this need. Money was made by selling alcohol and hosting card games. Sometimes these ventures were so successful that the building used by the club was able to be purchased. The main attraction of these clubs was that they provided a place that deaf people could go to be around other deaf people, sometimes sharing stories, hosting parties, comedians, and plays. Many of today's common ABC stories were first seen at deaf clubs. The clubs were found in all of the major cities, New York City being home to at least 12. These clubs were an important break from their usually solitary day spent at factory jobs.

In the 1960s, deaf clubs began their quick and drastic decline. Today there are only a few spread-out deaf clubs found in the United States and their attendance is commonly small with a tendency to the elderly. This sudden decline is often attributed to the rise of technology like the TTY and closed captioning for personal TVs. With other options available for entertainment and communication, the need for deaf clubs grew smaller. It was no longer the only option for getting in touch with other members of the deaf community.

Others attribute the decline of deaf clubs to the end of World War II and a change in the job market. During WWII there was high demand for factory laborers and a promise of high pay. Many deaf Americans left their homes to move to bigger cities with the hope of obtaining a factory job. This huge influx of workers into new cities created the need for deaf clubs. When World War II ended and the civil rights movement progressed, the federal government started offering more jobs to deaf men and women. People began switching from manufacturing jobs to service jobs, moving away from solitary work with set hours. Today, deaf clubs are rare, but deaf advocacy centers and other deaf organizations have become widespread and popular.

==== African-American ====
National Black Deaf Advocates was established in 1982 "to promote the leadership development, economic and educational opportunities, social equality, and to safeguard the general health and welfare of Black deaf and hard-of-hearing people."

==== Leather ====
In 1986, Baltimore Leather Association of the Deaf (BLADeaf), the first deaf leather club in America, was founded. Its original name was Maryland Lambda Alliance of the Deaf and it had three name changes before its name was changed to BLADeaf. It was founded by Elwood C. Bennett, Scott Wilson, and Harry "Abbe" Woosley Jr. According to BLADeaf, the fact of the Baltimore Eagle being BLADeaf's home bar means the Baltimore Eagle is the world's first bar to home a deaf leather organization.

In 1989, a deaf chapter of the National Leather Association called “NLA: Deaf Chapter”, which eventually became International Deaf Leather, was founded by Michael Felts, Philip Rubin, Bob Donaldson, Rolf Hagton, Jim Dunne, Bobby Andrascik and Charles Wilkinson. International Deaf Leather held contests for the titles International Ms. Deaf Leather, International Mr. Deaf Leather, and International Deaf Leather Boy. International Deaf Leather also bestowed the Michael Felts Lifetime Achievement Award, which in 1997 was given to Baltimore Leather Association of the Deaf (BLADeaf) cofounder Harry “Abbé” Woosley Jr., and the International Deaf Leather Recognition Award, which in 1998 was given to Baltimore Leather Association of the Deaf (BLADeaf). International Deaf Leather ended in 2021.

Deaf leathermen sometimes compete at International Mr. Leather (IML); in 1992, IML featured three deaf contestants.

==== LGBTQ ====
There are several major institutions supporting the Deaf queer community in the United States. The Rainbow Alliance of the Deaf (RAD), previously named National Rainbow Society of the Deaf (NRSD), is a nonprofit established in America in 1977 to, "establish and maintain a society of Deaf LGBT". The RAD hosts an annual conference "to encourage and promote the educational, economical, and social welfare of Deaf LGBTQ individuals. RAD now has chapters in the United States and Canada. The Deaf Queer Resource Center (DQRC), was founded in 1995 founded by Drago Renteria and began as a website connects people to resources nationally. The DQRC is now a nonprofit that provides "peer support, support groups, information and referrals, educational workshops, work to increase visibility, educate on accessibility and preserve Deaf LGBT history."

Support and community groups for people with intersectional LGBTQ identities in the Deaf, DeafBlind, DeafDisabled and Hard of Hearing communities using ASL are held regionally and virtually. Queer ASL is an educational platform taught virtually by Deaf queer instructors focused on educating queer and trans people in a safe space. Deaf queer events include Rainbow Alliance of the Deaf conferences, the Deaf Lesbian Festival, and Deaf Queer Men Only.

Internationally, institutions include the Hong Kong Bauhinias Deaf Club, Deaf LGBTW in Fukoaka, Tohoku, Tokyo, and Osaka, Pinoy Deaf Rainbow in the Philippines, Deaf Rainbow NSW in Australia, Deaf Rainbow UK, Rainbow International Deaf at Israel, and the Greenbow LGBT Society of Ireland.

==== Religious ====
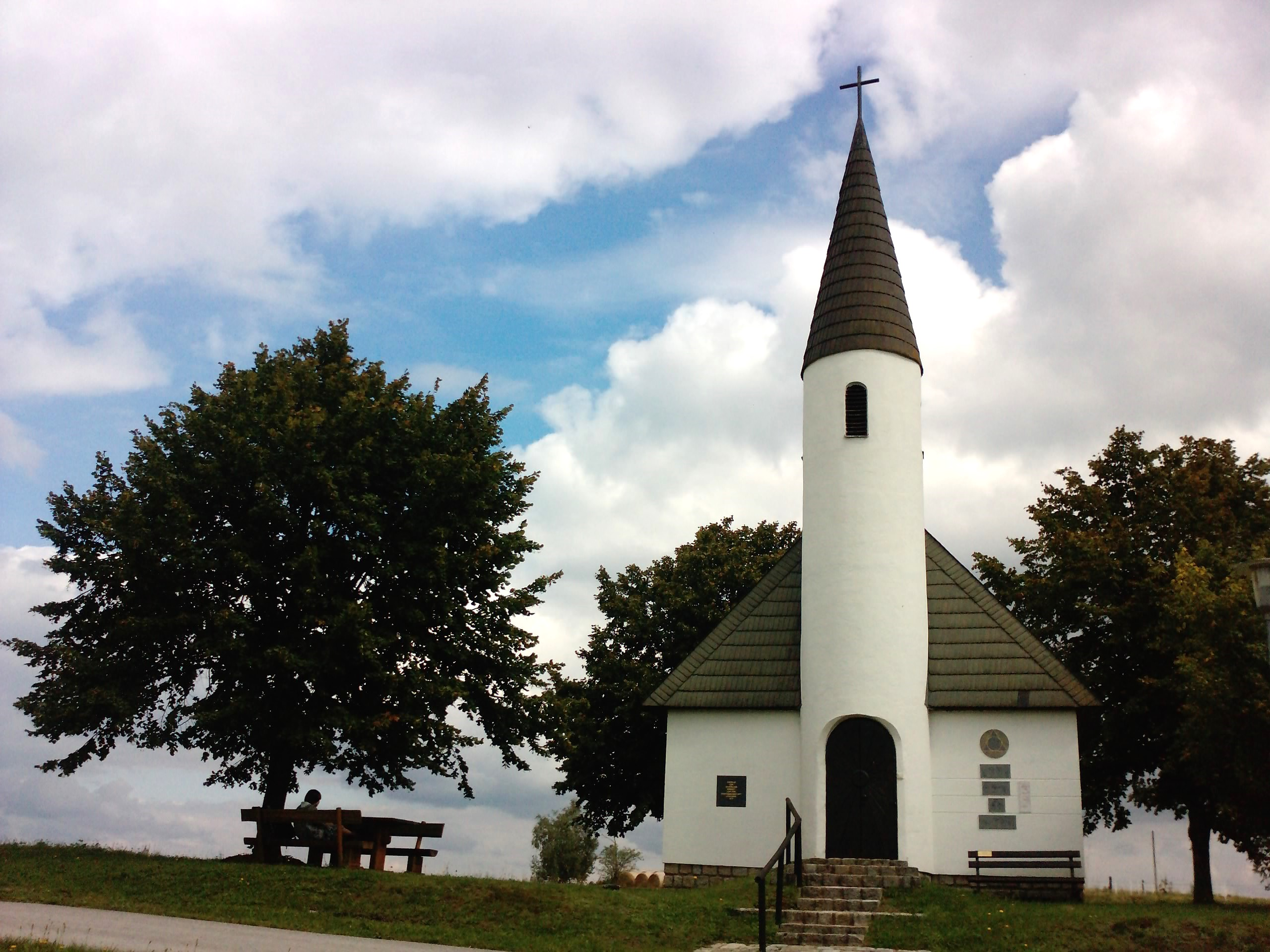
Chapel for deaf people in Loimanns, Lower Austria, built in 1979

There are deaf churches (where sign language is the main language), deaf synagogues, deaf Jewish community centers, and the Hebrew Seminary of the Deaf in Illinois. In 2011 the Conservative Movement unanimously passed the rabbinic responsa, "The Status of the Heresh [one who is deaf] and of Sign Language", by the Committee on Jewish Law and Standards (CJLS). This responsa declared that, among other things, "The Committee on Jewish Law and Standards rules that the deaf who communicate via sign language and do not speak are no longer to be considered mentally incapacitated. Jews who are deaf are responsible for observing mitzvot. Our communities, synagogues, schools, and camps must strive to be welcoming and accessible, and inclusive. Sign language may be used in matters of personal status and may be used in rituals. A deaf person called to the Torah who does not speak may recite the berakhot via sign language. A deaf person may serve as a shaliah tzibbur in sign language in a minyan whose medium of communication is sign language."

==== Women's ====
There are 15 chapters of Deaf Women United throughout the United States; its mission is, "to promote the lives of Deaf women through empowerment, enrichment, and networking." There is also Pink Wings of Hope, an American breast cancer support group for deaf and hard-of-hearing women.

=== Libraries ===
The library at Gallaudet University, the only deaf liberal arts university in the United States, was founded in 1876. The library's collection has grown from a small number of reference books to the world's largest collection of deaf-related materials, with over 234,000 books and thousands of other materials in different formats. The collection is so large that the library had to create a hybrid classification system based on the Dewey Decimal Classification System in order to make cataloging and location within the library easier for both library staff and users. The library also houses the university's archives, which holds some of the oldest deaf-related books and documents in the world.

The American Library Association, also founded in 1876, has stated that disabled people belong to a minority that is often overlooked and underrepresented by people in the library, and the Deaf community belongs in this minority group. The ALA's Library Bill of Rights preamble states that "all libraries are forums for information and ideas" and as such libraries need to remove the physical and technological barriers which in turn would allow persons with disabilities full access to the resources available.

One notable American activist in the library community working toward accessibility for the deaf was Alice Lougee Hagemeyer, herself deaf. In 1974 she created Deaf Awareness Week, later called Deaf Heritage Week, in which programs about deaf culture are held in libraries. In 1980 she founded the unit now known as the Library Service to People who are Deaf or Hard of Hearing Forum, which is a unit within the American Library Association.

Australian librarian Karen McQuigg stated in 2003 that "even ten years ago, when I was involved in a project looking at what public libraries could offer the deaf, it seemed as if the gap between the requirements of this group and what public libraries could offer was too great for public libraries to be able to serve them effectively."

In 2006 the American Library Association and the (American) National Association of the Deaf declared that they would recognize March 13 to April 15 as National Deaf History Month.

New guidelines from library organizations such as International Federation of Library Associations and Institutions (IFLA) and the ALA were written in order to help libraries make their information more accessible to people with disabilities, and in some cases, specifically the Deaf community. IFLA's Guidelines for Library Services to Deaf People is one such set of guidelines, and it was published to inform libraries of the services that should be provided for Deaf patrons. Most of the guidelines pertain to ensuring that Deaf patrons have equal access to all available library services. Other guidelines include training library staff to provide services for the Deaf community, availability of text telephones or TTYs not only to assist patrons with reference questions but also for making outside calls, using the most recent technology in order to communicate more effectively with Deaf patrons, including closed captioning services for any television services, and developing a collection that would interest the members of the Deaf community.

Over the years, library services have begun to evolve in order to accommodate the needs and desires of local Deaf communities. For example, at the Queens Borough Public Library (QBPL) in New York, the staff implemented new and innovative ideas in order to involve the community and library staff with the Deaf people in their community. The QBPL hired a deaf librarian, Lori Stambler-Dunsmore, to train the library staff about Deaf culture, to teach sign language classes for family members and people who are involved with deaf people, and to teach literacy classes for Deaf patrons. In working with the library, Stambler-Dunsmore was able to help the community reach out to its deaf neighbors, and helped other deaf people become more active in their outside community.

=== Services ===
In Nashville, Tennessee, Sandy Cohen manages the Library Services for the Deaf and Hard of Hearing (LSDHH). The program was created in 1979 in response to information accessibility issues for the Deaf in the Nashville area. Originally, the only service provided was the news via a teletypewriter or TTY, but today, the program has expanded to serving the entire state of Tennessee by providing all different types of information and material on deafness, Deaf culture, and information for family members of Deaf people, as well as a historical and reference collection.

== See also ==
- Audism
- Deaf culture in the United States
- Sign name
- Deaf flag
- Deaf theatre
- U výčepu, a Czech sign language comedy play
- List of Deaf films
- Deaf theology
- Deaf mental health care
- Language deprivation in deaf and hard of hearing children
