= Stan Pavko =

American football player and coach (1916–2002)

- Stonko Pavkov, c. 1940

No. 30
- Positions: Guard, tackle

Personal information
- Born: October 23, 1916; Gooding, Idaho, U.S.
- Died: February 8, 2002 (aged 85); Modesto, California, U.S.
- Listed height: 6 ft 0 in (1.83 m)
- Listed weight: 212 lb (96 kg)

Career information
- High school: Gooding (Gooding, Idaho)
- College: Idaho

Career history

Playing
- Pittsburgh Steelers (1939–1940)

Coaching
- Football: Modesto (1948–1950) Line coach; Modesto (1951–1967) Head coach; Track: Modesto (1948–?) Head coach

Operations
- Modesto (1968–1975) Athletic director

Career statistics
- Games played: 11
- Games started: 2

Stonko Sidney "Stan" Pavkov (October 23, 1916 – February 8, 2002) was an American football player and coach. He played college football for Idaho from 1935 to 1937 and professional football for the Cincinnati Bengals (1938) and Pittsburgh Pirates/Steelers (1939–1940). He was an Idaho high school coach from 1940 to 1948. He moved to California in 1948 and held various coaching positions at Modesto Junior College for 48 years from 1948 to 1996.

== Early life ==
Pavkov was born in 1916 in Gooding, Idaho. He attended Gooding High School where he was an outstanding football player and wrestler. He then played college football for Idaho Vandals from 1935 to 1937. He also competed on the wrestling team at Idaho and narrowly missed making the US Olympic team in 1936.

== Professional football ==
Pavokov signed a contract with the Cleveland Rams in March 1938.also played professional football for the minor league Cincinnati Bengals and Paterson Panthers in 1938. He then played in the National Football League (NFL) for the Pittsburgh Steelers during the 1939 and 1940 season. He appeared in 11 or 13 NFL games as an offenssive guard and linebacker for the Pirates/Steelers.

== Coaching career ==
After his playing career ended, Pavkov served in the U.S. Army. He then returned to Idaho and taught and coach football and track in American Falls, Blackfoot, and Idaho Falls.

In 1948, he was hired as head track coach and assistant football coach at Modesto Junior College (MJC) in Modesto, California. In 1951, we was promoted to head football coach, holding that position for 17 seasons and compiling a 66–83–7 record. He later became the athletic director and remained at MJC until 1995. At Modesto, he coached players such as Gino Marchetti, Paul Wiggin, Dave Maggard, Proverb Jacobs, and John Gamble. He also coached golf, track, and swimming at Modesto Junior College. He retired from Modesto in 1995.

== Later years and death ==
Pavkov was inducted into the Idaho Hall of Fame in 1990. After moving to Modesto, he changed his name to S. Stan Pavko. He died on February 8, 2002, at age 85, in Modesto.

== Head coaching record ==
=== Junior college football ===
Year	Team	Overall	Conference	Standing	Bowl/playoffs
Modesto Pirates (Big Seven/Eight Conference) (1951–1961)
1951	Modesto	6–4	3–3	T–3rd	
1952	Modesto	7–2	4–2	T–2nd	
1953	Modesto	7–3	4–2	3rd	
1954	Modesto	1–7–1	1–4–1	6th	
1955	Modesto	5–4	4–3	3rd	
1956	Modesto	3–6	3–4	5th	
1957	Modesto	5–4	5–2	T–1st	
1958	Modesto	7–2	5–2	T–1st	
1959	Modesto	2–6–1	1–5–1	7th	
1960	Modesto	3–6	3–4	T–5th	
1961	Modesto	3–6	2–5	T–5th	
Modesto Pirates (Valley Conference) (1962–1967)
1962	Modesto	6–3	3–2	T–2nd	
1963	Modesto	2–5–2	1–3–1	T–4th	
1964	Modesto	0–7–1	0–5	6th	
1965	Modesto	4–5	1–4	6th	
1966	Modesto	2–7	0–5	6th	
1967	Modesto	1–7–1	0–4–1	6th	
Modesto:		64–84–6	40–59–4		
Total:		64–84–6			
National championship Conference title Conference division title or championship game berth
