= North Valley Academy =

School in Gooding, Idaho

Coordinates: 42.9360°N 114.7124°W

- Gooding, Gooding County, Idaho; United States

Information
- School type: Charter school
- Established: 2008; 18 years ago
- Grades: K-12
- Enrollment: 175 (2023-2024)

North Valley Academy Inc. is a Kindergarten – Grade 12 charter school in Gooding, Idaho.

The North Valley Academy charter school was approved December 20, 2007. Kindergarten through eighth grade started in the 2008–2009 school year, grades 9-12 began in the 2009–2010 school year.

== History ==
In 2008 the enrollment was 162. At that time, there was debate in the Gooding Chamber of Commerce over to what extent the school would pull students from the Gooding School District.

In 2009 the school did not yet have its own campus, but rented space from the Idaho School for the Deaf and the Blind. It had plans to buy a permanent building with money from the United States Department of Agriculture.

By 2009, the enrollment in the school district was down to 90% of its pre-NVA levels.
