= A Dictionary of American Sign Language on Linguistic Principles =

Dictionary published in 1965

- Title page for A Dictionary of American Sign Language on Linguistic Principles (1965)
- Author: William C. Stokoe; Dorothy C. Casterline; Carl G. Croneberg
- Language: English
- Genre: Reference
- Publisher: Gallaudet University Press
- Publication date: 1965
- Publication place: United States
- Awards: 346
- ISBN: 978-0-932-13000-6

A Dictionary of American Sign Language on Linguistic Principles (DASL) is the first American Sign Language (ASL) dictionary based on linguistic principles written by William C. Stokoe, Dorothy C. Casterline, and Carl G. Croneberg. It was first published in 1965 by the Gallaudet College Press. The dictionary introduces a new notation system, Stokoe notation, to represent the form of ASL signs independently from English translation.

== Stokoe notation ==
Stokoe notation utilizes three distinctive features of a sign to represent the written form; location (tabulation; TAB; "T"), handshape (designation; DEZ; "D"), and movement (signation; SIG; "s"). The formula for writing a sign is tab-dez-sig or TD^{s}. If a sign contains a sig action that occurs after another, it can be written as TD^{ss}. For a sign that contains a combination of sig actions that occur simultaneously, the formula TD^{s/s} would apply. The structure of TDD^{s} is utilized when both hands are involved in the formation of a sign and can be referred as a double-dez.

There is a total of fifty-five symbols to formulate the written form of an ASL sign. Twelve of the symbols are strictly used for tab. Nineteen of the symbols pertain to dez with a few being interchangeably used as tab. The remaining twenty-four are strictly sig symbols with five sub-groups; vertical, sideways, horizontal, rotary, and interaction. The sub-groups further categorize the sig symbols based on their directional movement. The horizontal sub-group are those with the directional movement of moving closer or away from the signer. The interaction sub-group symbols are to indicate the interrelationship between a double-dez or tab-dez of a sign. The rotary sub-group are symbols with a rotating movement of the forearm. The vertical sub-group include symbols with upward and downward motions. Similarly, the sideways sub-group are symbols with rightward and leftward movements.

=== Example ===
The following illustrates the Stokoe notation for "opening of a book":

B ^{l} B ^{$a$}

The dez symbol "B" indicates the hand is flat with the fingers extended close together. The vertical line "I" between the two dez symbols are to signify that both hands are close together or side by side. The sig symbol "$a$" represents the hands facing upward and is part of the rotary sub-group.

== Authors backgrounds ==
=== William Stokoe ===
William Clarence Stokoe, Jr. was born in Lancaster, New Hampshire on July 21, 1919. Stokoe attended Cornell University and in 1946, he graduated with his PhD in English. He specialized in medieval literature and Old English. His first teaching job was at Wells College, where he taught English.(Citations) In 1955, Stokoe was hired to teach English and become the chair of the English Department at Gallaudet University. Before coming to Gallaudet University, Stokoe had not learned sign language and took sign language classes from Elizabeth Benson.

In 1960 Stokoe published his first paper on signed language structure that within months after publishing, he received a $22,000 grant from National Science Foundation which lead to the creation of the first ALS dictionary, A Dictionary of American Sign Language on Linguistic Principles. Carl Croneberg and Dorthy Casterline were two fellow researchers and authors that worked with Stokoe on the creation of the dictionary. Throughout the research of the book Stokoe, Croneberg, and Casterline received criticism on their work.

In 1984, Stokoe retired from teaching at Gallaudet University, but still continued to edit for the journal Sign Language Studies.

=== Carl Croneberg ===
Carl Gustaf Croneberg was born in a small Swedish town on April 29, 1930. Between the ages of ten and twelve, Croneberg lost his hearing, and due to his deafness, his parents sent him to a Deaf institution. Croneberg acquired and became fluent in Swedish sign language at the school without being formally taught. Croneberg also learned English and German from a “correspondence course.” In 1950, Croneberg learned about Gallaudet University from his high school headmaster, and in the spring of 1950, he met President Elstad from the University. President Elstad was impressed with Croneberg and recruited him to enroll in Gallaudet University. In the fall of 1951, Croneberg began earning his degree at Gallaudet University and learned American Sign Language (ASL). In 1955, Croneberg earned his B.A. in English at Gallaudet University, and then in 1959, he got his M.A. in English at Catholic University.

While Croneberg was earning his M.A., he was also offered and hired as an assistant to the English department at Gallaudet University. In 1959, after a few promotions, Croneberg was an assistant professor and earned the admiration of William Stokoe. Stokoe offered Croneberg to help with his research, and together with Dorthy Casterline, the three of them continued to work on Stokoe’s research, which resulted in the publication of A Dictionary of American Sign Language on Linguistic Principles. Croneberg remained at Gallaudet University teaching in the English department until his retirement in 1986.

=== Dorothy Casterline ===
Dorothy Chiyoko Sueoka Casterline was born to her parents, Toshiba and Toyiko Sueoka, on April 27, 1928, in Honolulu, Hawaii. In seventh grade, Casterline became deaf after suffering from an illness, possibly mastoiditis, and she completed the year in public school before transferring to Hawaii School for the Deaf and Blind. Casterline remained at the Hawaii School for the Deaf and Blind for three to four years, where she was taught orally. Casterline stated that students signed outside the classes and only managed to pick up enough signs to communicate with fellow students. It wasn’t until 1955 that Casterline enrolled and attended Gallaudet University, where she officially picked up signing. Casterline was the first Native Hawaiian student to graduate and receive a degree at Gallaudet University.

The same year that Casterline started at Gallaudet University, 1955, William Stokoe also started at the university as an English Professor. Stokoe was one of Casterline’s professors. When Casterline graduated, she joined the English Department at Gallaudet University, where she taught classes and worked with Stokoe on his research. Casterline, Stokoe, and Carl Cronberg collaborated on Stokoe’s research, which resulted in the publication of A Dictionary of American Sign Language on Linguistic Principles.

== Impact ==
The text had expanded more upon the ideas and previous work of William Stokoe like Sign Language Structure where it contained and cataloged more than 2,000 signs as well as provide in-depth introduction of the American Sign Language basic structure for the readers to infer to. The dictionary had brought forth groundwork for future research and interest about signed languages within the field of linguistics, despite the interest and outlook that increased a decade after Stokoe's monograph in 1960s. It would help establish sign language as a new topic of interest in linguistics research with the initial focus on American Sign Language. While the initial focus was on American Sign Language, researchers and linguists began to look at other sign languages for research like countries in Europe, South America, and so on. Leading to the creation of the International Sign Linguistics Association or ISLA in 1987, with the mission of the research of sign language across the world and develop collaboration in the field of sign language studies. Different literature and conferences held over the past decades have increased from the attention of sign language studies. There was also an increase of its impact outside of linguistic research like in deaf education and the recognition of sign language being a language.
