= HSDB =

HSDB may refer to:

- Hawaii School for the Deaf and the Blind
- Hazardous Substances Data Bank
