= Ángel Ramos (educator) =

Puerto Rican educator (born 1949)

- Born: 1949 (age 76–77); Manhattan, New York
- Occupation: Educator

Ángel Ramos (born December 30, 1949) is an educator, school administrator, and current principal of the Hawaii School for the Deaf and the Blind. He was the founder of the National Hispanic Council of the Deaf and Hard of Hearing. He formerly served as Superintendent of the Idaho School for the Deaf and the Blind, the Sequoia School for the Deaf and Hard of Hearing, and the Marie Katzenbach School for the Deaf. He is the second deaf Hispanic/Latino to receive a doctorate degree and the first to receive a doctorate from Gallaudet University.

== Early years ==
Ramos' mother, Maria Monserrate, was born in Mayagüez, Puerto Rico. His father, Miguel Ángel Ramos, was born in Vieques, Puerto Rico. After his parents married, they moved to New York City. When Monserrate became pregnant with Ángel, her husband demanded that she have an abortion or he would divorce her. Monserrate refused and the pair divorced shortly after Ramos's birth. As a result, Ramos and his sister were raised solely by his mother, who worked as a seamstress. They grew up in housing projects in Manhattan along with a number of relatives. Ramos attended public schools. In 1959, when Ramos was nine years old, he woke up one morning and could not hear. As a Catholic, he thought God had punished him and hid his hearing loss from his mother for two years. He succeeded in school since he could already read and write in English and Spanish, and was able to follow directions on the classroom blackboard and by reading his textbooks carefully. By 1961, he had learned to lip-read, helping him to graduate.

== Academic education ==
Despite being poor and being raised by a single parent, Ramos was able to pursue a college education thanks to financial support from the New York Division of Vocational Rehabilitation. He graduated from Manhattan College in 1971 with a Bachelor of Science degree in mathematics. Unable to find employment due to being deaf, he drove a taxi in New York City until he was hired as a gym supervisor at Lexington School for the Deaf, with his only pay being room and board. Eventually, he became a teaching assistant at St. Joseph's School for the Deaf.

Dissatisfied with his career and wanting a better future, Ramos applied for, and received, financial assistance from the NY Division of Vocational Rehabilitation to pursue a master's degree. He attended the State University of New York at Geneseo, where he earned a Master of Science degree in Education of the Deaf. After working at the New York School for the Deaf as a math teacher for three years, he received a full scholarship to the National Leadership Program at the California State University, Northridge, where he earned a second master's degree in educational administration. After working at the National Technical Institute for the Deaf and the Southwest Collegiate Institute for the Deaf for several years, he received another scholarship to pursue a doctorate degree in educational administration and supervision from Gallaudet University in Washington, D.C. He became the first, and only, deaf Hispanic/Latino to receive a doctorate degree from Gallaudet in 1997. Ramos held a teaching position at Lamar University in Beaumont, Texas and was Director of the Gallaudet University Regional Center in Texas. During that time he received a Fulbright Scholar Award and was assigned to Colombia to improve the delivery of educational services to students who are deaf and hard of hearing. He is the founder the National Hispanic Council of the Deaf and Hard of Hearing in Washington, D.C.

== Superintendent of the Idaho School for the Deaf and the Blind ==
On August 1, 2001, Ramos was hired as Superintendent of the Idaho School for the Deaf and the Blind, located in Gooding, Idaho. The executive director of the Idaho State Board of Education, Dr. Gregory Fitch, instructed Ramos to change the "custodial" school to an "educational" school. After Dr. Fitch resigned as executive director, some long-time employees of the school, dissatisfied with the changes Ramos was making at the school and preferring the old custodial model, convinced the Idaho State Board of Education to take steps to remove Ramos as superintendent, On July 30, 2003, the State BOE put Ramos on administrative leave due to allegations that he illegally sold state surplus property, that he had a conflict of interest in preferential hiring, and that he had retaliated against detractors. Supporters of Ramos stated that he raised the bar of education in the school; in September 2003, a group of students demonstrated on the school lawn in support of Ramos. After a year-long administrative leave and court hearing, Ramos was exonerated of all charges. The State Board of Education was ordered to reinstate Ramos as superintendent and to support Ramos in his efforts to change the school from a custodial school to an educational school. Left with a legal bill of $80,000, Ramos agreed not to sue the State Board of Education in exchange for a $180,000 settlement and resigning from his position as superintendent.

== Later years ==
After moving to Arizona In 2004, Ramos was appointed Superintendent of the Sequoia School for the Deaf and Hard of Hearing, a charter school in Arizona with campuses in Mesa and Phoenix. Ramos transformed the school from an underperforming school to one of the few "Performing" schools for students who are Deaf and hard of hearing in the country. For his efforts in transforming SSDHH into a "Performing" school, he was recognized as Administrator of the Year and Principal of the Year. While Ramos was Superintendent of Sequoia Deaf School, the then-Governor of Arizona, Janet Napolitano, appointed Ramos as a commissioner on the Arizona Commission for the Deaf and Hard of Hearing. The Assistant Secretary of Education later appointed Ramos to the National Technical Institute for the Deaf National Advisory Group.

After seven years at Sequoia Deaf School, on July 30, 2011, the New Jersey Commissioner of Education, Dr. Christopher Cerf, appointed Ramos as Superintendent of the Marie Katzenbach School for the Deaf (MKSD), with instructions to transform the school into an educational school. For three years, he worked closely with Commissioner Cerf to transform the school until Cerf's resignation in 2015. With Cerf's departure, the vision for MKSD changed focus, and, unwilling to work in this new climate, Ramos retired on June 30, 2015. Shortly after his retirement, Ramos created the first and only virtual school for students who are deaf and hard of hearing, The Princeton School, with the goal of providing supplemental assistance to schools and vocational rehabilitation programs in their effort to help these students be successful adults.

Ramos is currently the principal of the Hawaii School for the Deaf and the Blind.

== Writing ==
In 2003, Ramos published "Triumph of the Spirit: The DPN Chronicle", about the history of deaf students at Gallaudet University.

== See also ==
- List of Puerto Ricans
