= Gooding School District =

School district headquartered in Gooding, Idaho

Gooding Joint School District 231 is a school district headquartered in Gooding, Idaho.

The district is mostly in Gooding County, and it has a portion in Lincoln County.

There are approximately 1200 students in the district. It ranks 43rd in size amongst the 114 school districts in Idaho.

The Gooding Joint School District was ranked in fourth place (in the small district category) on the Digital School Districts Survey, for its "use of technology to govern the district [and to] communicate with students, parents and the community."

Gooding School District was the first district in the nation to win the HealthierUS Challenge "Gold Award of Distinction."

== History ==
In the 1970s a group of parents from Bliss, located in the Bliss School District, sought to enroll their children in the Gooding schools. The Bliss district, beginning in 1975, decided not to permit certain parents to enroll children in the Gooding schools in a tuition free way, and in response the Gooding district denied the transfers since that district did not get tuition money. The Gooding district attempted to get the parents to pay tuition fees, and court involvement began in June 1976 after the district filed a lawsuit against those parents. Douglas Kramer, a court judge of the fifth district, ruled in 1978 that a school district is permitted to charge tuition, but that the district may not necessarily have to take that tuition from parents instead of other parties, and that the paramount question is what is the best case scenario for the student rather than the identity of the persons or groups paying the tuition.

In 2008, Heather Williams, the district superintendent, stated that the district worked together with the charter school North Valley Academy (VIA).

In 2009 the district leadership was deciding whether students should go to school for four days per week instead of five.

By 2009, the enrollment in the school district was down to 90% of the levels from before the opening of NVA.

== Schools ==
- Gooding High School
- Gooding Middle School
- Gooding Elementary School
