= Bliss School =

Location
- 601 East Highway 30; Bliss, Idaho; United States; 42.922865°N 114.942730°W

Information
- Type: Public
- Established: 1920; 106 years ago
- School district: Bliss Joint School District #234
- Principal: Emily Roe
- Staff: 14.5
- Grades: K–12
- Enrollment: 110 (2025)
- Student to teacher ratio: 7.59
- Colors: Maroon; White
- Athletics conference: 1A Sawtooth Conference
- Mascot: Bears
- Accreditation: Cognia
- Website: bliss234.org

Bliss School is a grade K-12 Public school located in Bliss, Idaho.

== History ==
Early homesteading schools opened up in the mid-1880s with the Bliss school district #21 created in 1884. The first Bliss school opened in 1892, with Lydia Bliss as the schoolteacher. In 1917 and 1918, these early schools were consolidated with the first high school classes taught in 1919. The following year, 1920, a modern school was built in Bliss. The doors opened for school on September 13th, 1920. A number of the courses were available to the first class at the school including Latin I, II and III, Spanish, Physics, Plane Geometry, American History, Typewriting, Ancient History and Civics. In 1921, a new Bliss School District #234 was formed.

== Athletics ==
Bliss High School Bears compete in the 1A division, the smallest division in the Idaho High School Activities Association (IHSAA). They participate in the District IV Sawtooth Conference.
