= Bliss School District =

School district in Idaho, United States

Bliss Joint School District 234 is a school district headquartered in Bliss, Idaho and includes the grades K-12 Bliss School.

The district is mostly in Gooding County, and it has portions in Elmore and Twin Falls counties.

== History ==
In the 1970s a group of Bliss parents sought to enroll their children in the Gooding School District. The Bliss district, beginning in 1975, decided not to permit certain parents to enroll children in the Gooding schools in a tuition free way, and in response the Gooding district denied the transfers since that district did not get tuition money. The Gooding district attempted to get the parents to pay tuition fees, and court involvement began in June 1976 after the district filed a lawsuit against those parents. Douglas Kramer, a court judge of the fifth district, ruled in 1978 that a school district is permitted to charge tuition, but that the district may not necessarily have to take that tuition from parents instead of other parties, and that the paramount question is what is the best case scenario for the student rather than the identity of the persons or groups paying the tuition. Some parents also sued the Bliss School District.

Circa 1978 enrollment was 135, and in August 1979 enrollment was 130.
