= Carl Croneberg =

American linguist (1930–2022)

Carl G. Croneberg
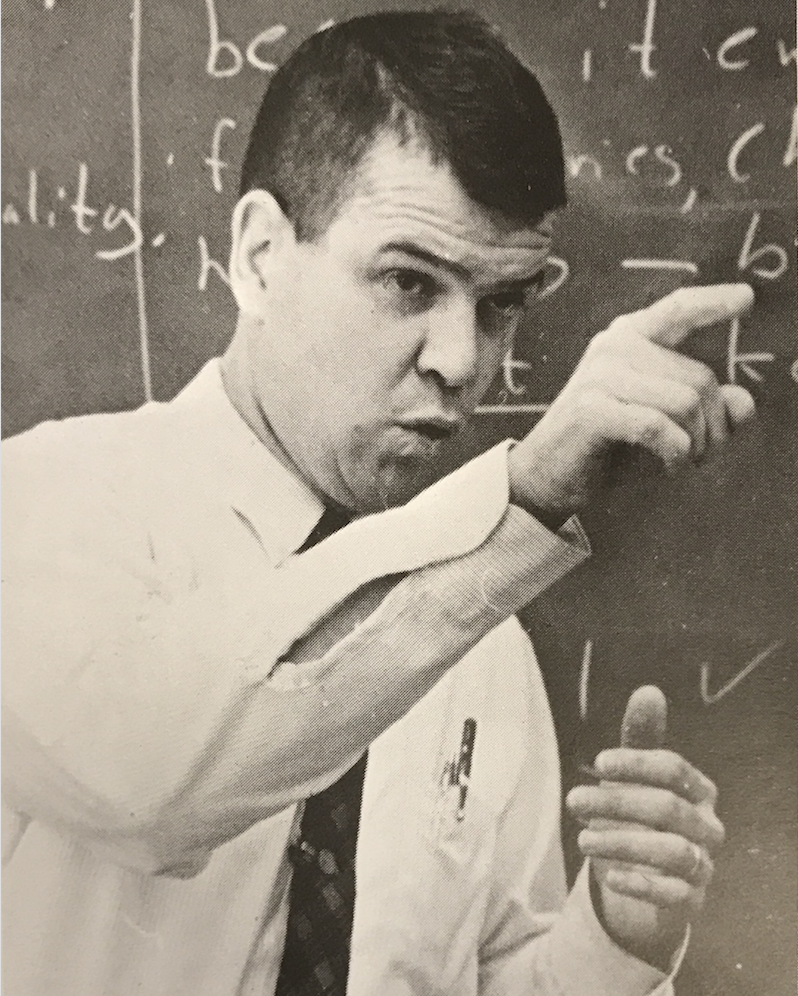
- Croneberg in the early 1960s
- Born: Carl Gustav Arvid Olof Croneberg; 26 April 1930; Norrbärke, Sweden
- Died: 7 August 2022 (aged 92)
- Citizenship: Swedish and American
- Occupations: Researcher, professor
- Spouse: Eleanor Wetzel
- Children: 3

Academic background
- Education: Gallaudet University (BA); Catholic University (MA)

Academic work
- Discipline: Linguist
- Sub-discipline: American Sign Language
- Institutions: Gallaudet University

Carl Gustav Arvid Olof Croneberg (26 April 1930 – 7 August 2022) was a Swedish-American Deaf linguist known for his work on American Sign Language (ASL).

== Early life and education ==
Croneberg was born in 1930 in Norrbärke, near Stockholm. He lost his hearing at the age of 10 and was subsequently sent to a Deaf institution where he was educated in Swedish Sign Language. In 1951, he was recruited by Gallaudet University president Leonard M. Elstad to enroll at the university. He graduated in 1955 with a bachelor's degree in English.

== Career ==
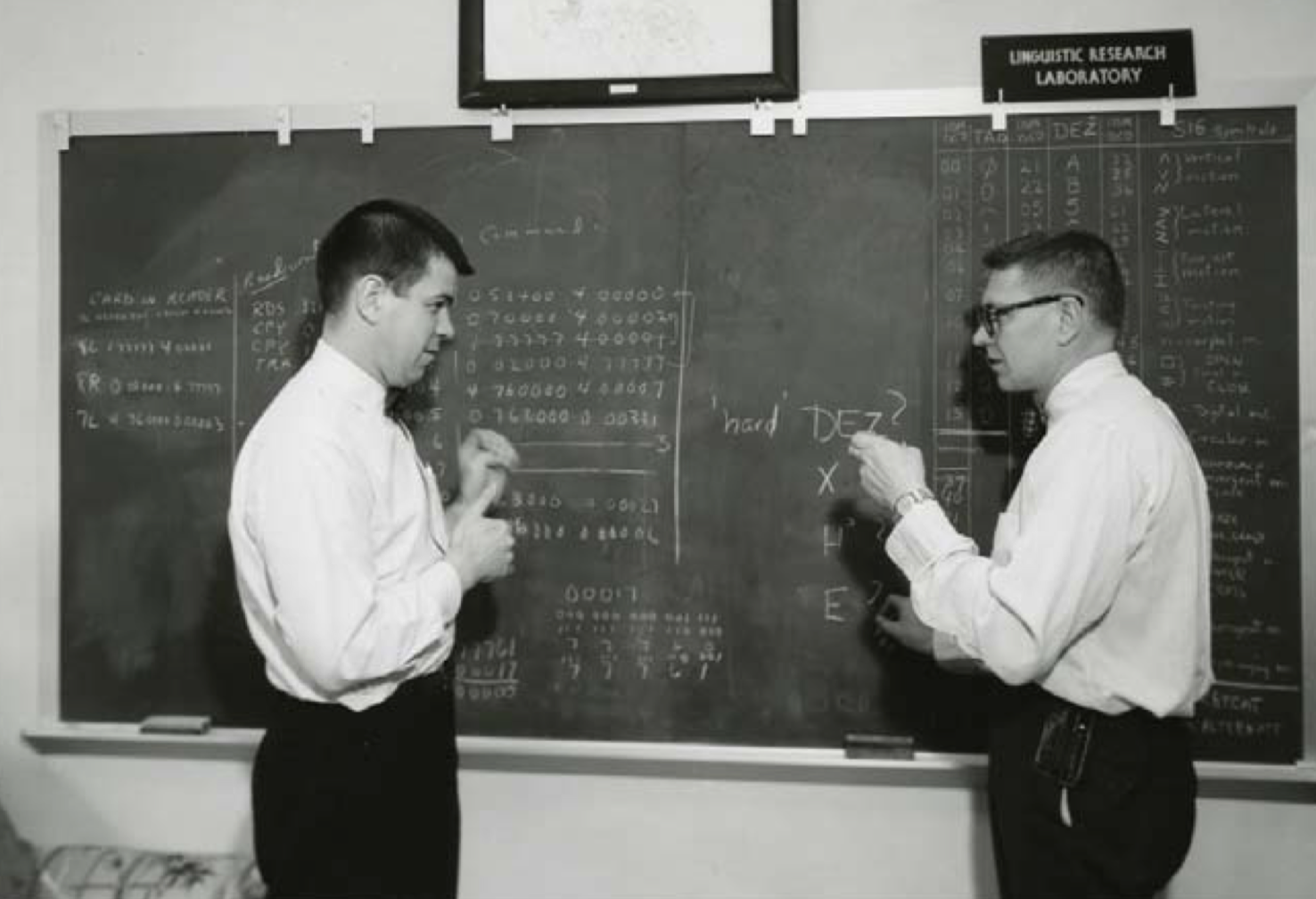
Croneberg and Stokoe at Linguistic Research Laboratory (1961)

In 1958, Croneberg was recruited by William C. Stokoe to work in a research laboratory for a linguistic analysis of the language of signs. Alongside researchers William C. Stokoe and Dorothy S. Casterline, he noticed that ASL has a linguistic system (phonology, morphology, syntax). They recognized ASL as a natural language with its own rules of grammar and syntax. Later, he was a co-writer of A Dictionary of American Sign Language on Linguistic Principles, with Stokoe and Casterline. In the book, Croneberg gave an early ethnographic and sociological portrait on the Deaf community and its regional dialects.

Croneberg was one of the first sociologists to use the term "culture" to describe signing deaf Americans' way of life, and was the first to discuss the differences between Black ASL and white ASL. The term was first written in uppercase as "Deaf culture" in 1975. The work on Deaf Culture and Black American Sign Language continues. Croneberg knew four languages: Swedish, German, English and ASL. He taught in the English department at Gallaudet University for 30 years until his retirement in 1986.

On 13 May 2022, Croneberg was awarded an honorary degree, Doctor of Humane Letters degree from Gallaudet University for his pioneer work in American Sign Language research.

== Personal life and death ==
Croneberg was married to the former Eleanor Wetzel, and had two daughters and a son. He died on 7 August 2022, at the age of 92.

== Publications ==
- Stokoe, William C.; Dorothy C. Casterline; Carl G. Croneberg. 1965. A Dictionary of American Sign Language on Linguistic Principles. Washington, D.C.: Gallaudet College Press
