= Colston Loveland =

American football player (born 2004)

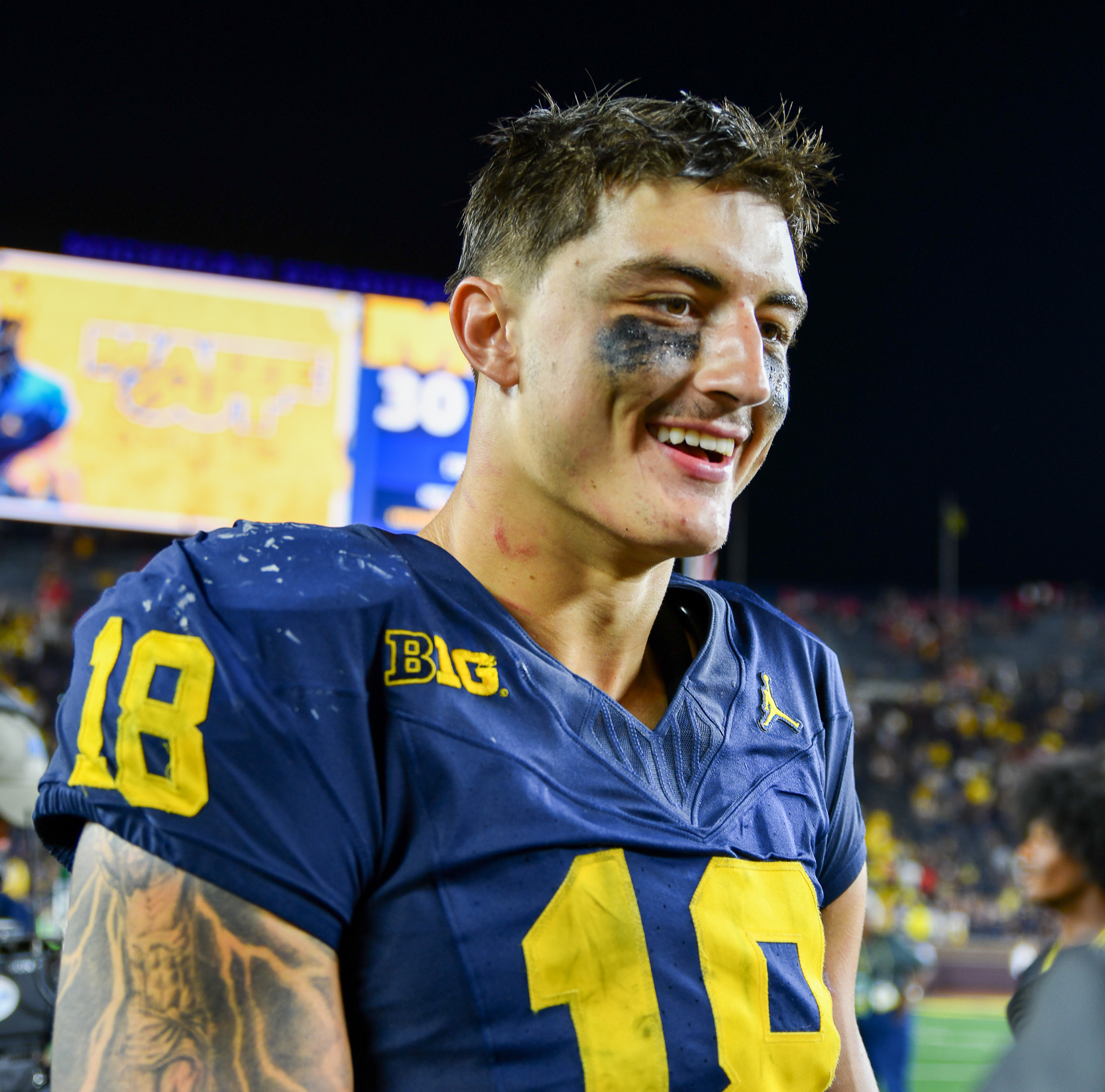
- Loveland with the Michigan Wolverines in 2024

No. 84 – Chicago Bears
- Position: Tight end
- Roster status: Active

Personal information
- Born: April 9, 2004 (age 22); Goldendale, Washington, U.S.
- Listed height: 6 ft 6 in (1.98 m)
- Listed weight: 241 lb (109 kg)

Career information
- High school: Gooding (Gooding, Idaho)
- College: Michigan (2022–2024)
- NFL draft: 2025: 1st round, 10th overall pick

Career history
- Chicago Bears (2025–present)

Awards and highlights
- ESPN NFL All-Rookie Team (2025); CFP national champion (2023); Second-team All-American (2024); First-team All-Big Ten (2023); Second-team All-Big Ten (2024)

Career NFL statistics as of Week 9, 2026
- Receptions: 95
- Receiving yards: 1,076
- Receiving touchdowns: 8
- Stats at Pro Football Reference

Colston Loveland (born April 9, 2004) is an American professional football tight end for the Chicago Bears of the National Football League (NFL). He played college football for the Michigan Wolverines, winning a national championship in 2023 and earning All-American honors in 2024. Loveland was selected by the Bears with the tenth overall pick in the first round of the 2025 NFL draft.

== Early life ==
Loveland was born on April 9, 2004 in Goldendale, Washington, the son of Chad Loveland and Rachel Faulkner, but grew up on a farm in Bliss, Idaho. As a child, Loveland participated in rodeo, before eventually leaving the sport to focus on other passions, such as football and basketball. He attended Gooding High School in Gooding, Idaho, where he starred in basketball and football. He caught 235 passes (91 as a sophomore) for 3,141 yards and 35 touchdowns at Gooding.

As a senior, he played tight end and linebacker, catching 62 passes for 968 yards and 14 touchdowns, leading the Gooding Senators (9–1) to the Class 3A semifinals. Loveland rushed for 352 yards and four touchdowns on 33 carries, and also recorded 57 tackles, 18 tackles for a loss, 5.5 sacks and two interceptions on defense.

Loveland was rated as a four star recruit, a top 250 ranked player in the country and the No. 1 player in Idaho, winning the 2021 Idaho Gatorade Player of the Year award. He received offers from Michigan, Alabama, LSU, Auburn, Utah, Oregon State, Arizona State, Nevada, Idaho, Idaho State, and Utah State.

== College career ==
=== Freshman season (2022) ===
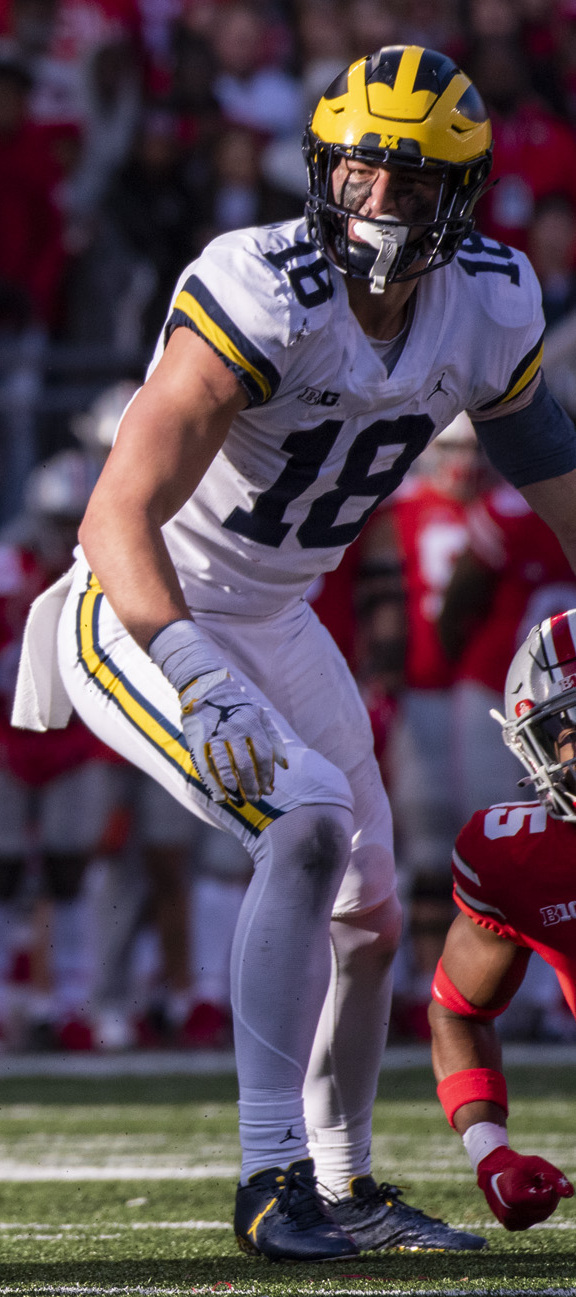
Loveland with Michigan against Ohio State in a 45–23 victory in 2022

In July 2021, Loveland committed to play college football at the University of Michigan. He graduated and enrolled early in January 2022. He appeared in his first game for Michigan versus Colorado State on September 3, 2022, and had two receptions for 18 yards. In the 2022 season, Loveland had 16 receptions for 235 yards and two touchdowns. Against Ohio State, he caught a 45-yard pass thrown by J. J. McCarthy at the beginning of the third quarter for his first collegiate touchdown. He caught a touchdown the following week in the Big Ten Championship Game, helping Michigan win its second consecutive conference championship.

=== Sophomore season (2023) ===
In the 2023 season, Loveland played and started all 15 games as a sophomore for Michigan. He finished the season with 45 catches, 649 receiving yards, and four receiving touchdowns. He was named a first-team All-Big Ten selection by the coaches and a second-team by the media. He helped Michigan finish the season 15–0, including winning the Big Ten Championship, Rose Bowl, and the national championship. Loveland was the leading receiver for the Wolverines in the national championship game, with three catches for 64 yards. Loveland became the first Idahoan to be a part of a national championship squad since Jorrell Bostrom for Auburn in 2010.

=== Junior season (2024) ===
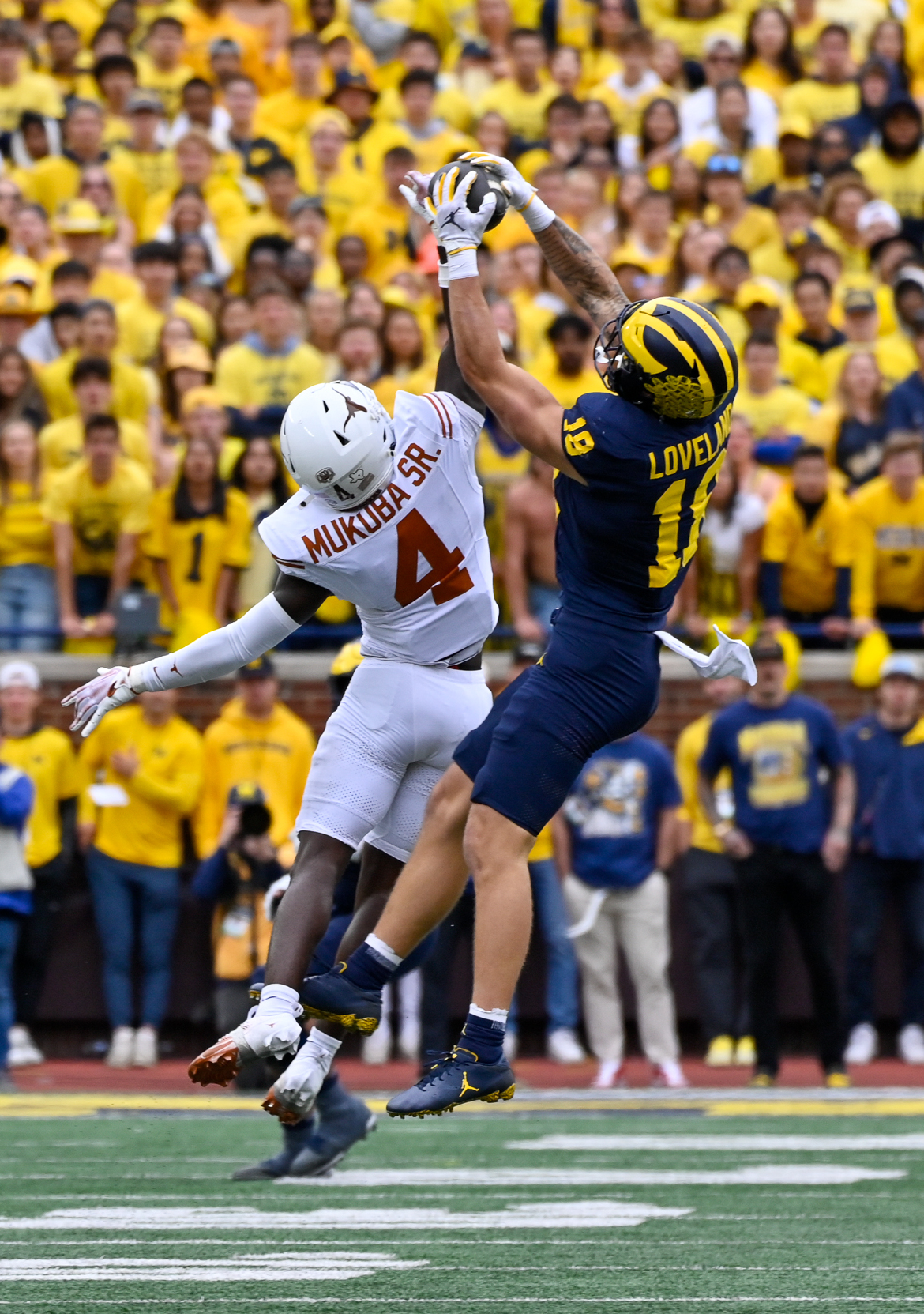
Loveland making a reception against Andrew Mukuba of the Texas Longhorns in 2024

Entering his junior season, Loveland was ranked as the best tight end in college football by members of the media. He was considered to be a first round pick in the 2025 NFL draft. In his first game of the season versus Fresno State, Loveland had eight receptions for 87 yards and a touchdown. In the week two loss against Texas, he was again Michigan’s leading receiver, finishing with eight receptions for 70 yards, though he had a costly fumble recovered by the Longhorns. In week six versus Washington, Loveland had six receptions for 33 yards and a touchdown. In week nine versus Michigan State, Loveland had six receptions for 67 yards, two touchdowns and a two-point conversion, as Michigan defeated the Spartans 24–17. It was his second consecutive two-touchdown game against Michigan State, matching his 2023 performance.

In week ten versus Oregon, he had his first career game with over 100 receiving yards, as he caught seven passes for 112 yards. In week thirteen versus Northwestern, Loveland had three receptions for 22 yards and a touchdown. With his three receptions, he passed Bennie Joppru (53 receptions in 2002) for the most receptions by a tight end in a season in Michigan football history, finishing with 56.

On November 26, Loveland was named one of three finalist for the 2024 John Mackey Award, given to the best tight end in college football, joining Harold Fannin Jr. of Bowling Green and the winner Tyler Warren of Penn State. He was the second-ever Wolverine to be a finalist for the award, joining 2016 winner Jake Butt. Loveland missed the last game of the season against Ohio State with an injury. He finished the season playing in ten games, totaling 56 receptions, 582 yards and five touchdowns. Loveland was named a second-team All-Big Ten selection, behind Tyler Warren. He also earned a second-team All-American selection by the Football Writers Association of America (FWAA).

On December 13, 2024, Loveland declared for the 2025 NFL draft, foregoing the ReliaQuest Bowl and his senior year. He finished his career at the University of Michigan with a 35–6 team record, two Big Ten championships, one national championship, All-American honors, All-Big Ten honors twice, and as the school's single-season record holder for receptions by a tight end. In his three years, he also finished tied for second in career touchdowns, third in career receptions and third in career receiving yards all-time among Michigan tight ends.

== Professional career ==
Pre-draft measurables
Height	Weight	Arm length	Hand span
6 ft 5 3/4 in (1.97 m)	248 lb (112 kg)	32 3/4 in (0.83 m)	10 in (0.25 m)
All values from NFL Combine

Loveland was selected with the tenth overall pick by the Chicago Bears in the first round of the 2025 NFL draft. He was the first tight end taken in the draft, and the third overall receiver.

He began his rookie season as the backup tight end behind Cole Kmet. After recording just two catches for 12 yards across the first two games, Loveland saw increased action that included a 31-yard gain in Week 3 and multiple-reception games over the next three weeks. Loveland scored his first touchdown in Week 9 against the Cincinnati Bengals on a five-yard pass, followed by the game-winning 58-yard touchdown with 17 seconds remaining to secure the Bears' 47–42 victory. He ended the game with six catches for 118 yards and the two scores, becoming the third Bears rookie with over 100 receiving yards and multiple touchdowns in a game since 1970 (alongside Willie Gault and Marty Booker) and the team's second rookie tight end to do so after Mike Ditka in 1961. The performance earned him NFC Offensive Player of the Week, the third Bears rookie to receive a weekly award (joining Anthony Thomas in 2001 and Jordan Howard in 2016) and third rookie tight end (after Mike Dyal in 1989 and Jeremy Shockey in 2002). In the Bears' wild card win over the Green Bay Packers, Loveland caught eight passes for 137 yards and scored on a two-point conversion, becoming the first rookie tight end to record eight receptions and over 100 receiving yards in a postseason game. Loveland finished his first season with 70 receptions for 906 yards and six touchdowns; he also had 193 yards across two playoff games, surpassing Sam LaPorta for the most by a rookie tight end in the postseason. Pro Football Focus ranked Loveland as the highest-graded rookie player and second-highest graded tight end of the 2025 season.

The 2026 season started with limited receiving production for Loveland, who was primarily tasked as a blocker instead. Through the first five games, he had 13 catches for 110 yards with zero scores while leading all tight ends in snaps as a run blocker. Loveland caught his first touchdown of the season in a Week 6 win over the Atlanta Falcons.

== Personal life ==
Loveland plays golf during the offseason.

== Career statistics ==
=== NFL ===
==== Regular season ====
Year	Team	Games		Receiving				
Year	Team	GP	GS	Rec	Yds	Y/R	Lng	TD
2025	CHI	16	11	58	713	12.3	58	6
2026	CHI	9	9	37	363	9.8	38	2
Career		25	20	94	1,076	11.3	76	8

==== Postseason ====
Year	Team	Games		Receiving				
Year	Team	GP	GS	Rec	Yds	Y/R	Lng	TD
2025	CHI	2	1	12	193	16.1	29	0
Career		2	1	12	193	16.1	29	0

=== College ===
Season	Team	Games		Receiving			
Season	Team	GP	GS	Rec	Yds	Avg	TD
2022	Michigan	14	5	16	235	14.7	2
2023	Michigan	15	12	45	649	14.4	4
2024	Michigan	10	7	56	582	10.4	5
Career		39	24	117	1,466	12.5	11

== Records ==
=== NFL records ===
- Most receiving yards in a single postseason by a rookie tight end: 193
