= Dorothy Casterline =

American linguist (1928–2023)

- Born: Dorothy Chiyoko Sueoka Casterline; April 27, 1928; Honolulu, Territory of Hawaii, U.S.
- Died: August 8, 2023 (aged 95); Irmo, South Carolina, U.S.
- Citizenship: Pacific Islander and American
- Occupations: Researcher, educator
- Spouse: James Casterline
- Children: 2
- Parents: Toshie Sueoka (father); Takiyo Sueoka (mother)

Academic background
- Education: Gallaudet University (BA)

Academic work
- Discipline: Linguist
- Sub-discipline: American Sign Language
- Institutions: Gallaudet University

Dorothy Chiyoko Sueoka Casterline (April 27, 1928 – August 8, 2023) was an American deaf linguist known for her contribution to A Dictionary of American Sign Language on Linguistic Principles, considered a foundational work of sign language linguistics.

== Life and career ==
Casterline was born Dorothy Sueoka on April 27, 1928, to parents of Japanese descent, and she grew up in Honolulu, Hawaii. She became deaf at age 14. After graduating from the Hawaii School for the Deaf and the Blind, then known as the Diamond Head School for the Deaf, she obtained a bachelor's degree in English from Gallaudet University in Washington, D.C. in 1958. She was the first deaf Hawaiian student to graduate from Gallaudet. She married fellow alumnus Jim Casterline, and they remained married until his death in 2012.

While at Gallaudet, she and her colleague Carl Croneberg were recruited by the linguist William Stokoe to contribute to their joint work A Dictionary of American Sign Language on Linguistic Principles. Published in 1965, the dictionary is considered a seminal text in the study of ASL, which promoted greater interest in and respect for the language. It was innovative in treating ASL as a real and natural language, rather than a variant of English. Casterline played an important role as a deaf collaborator with the hearing professor Stokoe over the several years it took to produce the dictionary. Stokoe also valued the multicultural makeup of his team, with Casterline's Asian Pacific Islander background and Croneberg's Swedish one. As part of this project, she collaborated with Stokoe and Croneberg beginning in 1960 on a study of the syntax and dialects of American Sign Language under funding provided by the National Science Foundation.

Casterline was living in Laurel, Maryland, as of 1994. In 2022, she was given an honorary doctorate of humane letters from Gallaudet, in recognition of her contributions to ASL linguistics and deaf studies. She died on August 8, 2023, at age 95.
