= Gooding High School =

Location
- 1050 7th Ave West; Gooding, Idaho; United States; 42.93870°N 114.724914°W

Information
- Type: Public
- Established: 1913
- School district: Gooding School District
- Principal: Principal Pope
- Teaching staff: 21.50 (FTE)
- Grades: 9-12
- Enrollment: 385 (2023-2024)
- Student to teacher ratio: 17.91
- Colors: Red, Black & White
- Mascot: Senator
- IHSAA Division: 3A
- Website: gsd231.org/ghs/

Gooding High School is a public high school located in Gooding, Idaho, United States. It is the main high school operated by the Gooding School District.

== Athletics ==
Gooding High School is classified as a 3A school (enrollment between 320 and 639) by the Idaho High School Activities Association. It currently competes in the Canyon Conference against Kimberly High School, Buhl High School, Filer High School (Idaho)

The Senator is Gooding High School's mascot, a reference to the town's namesake, Frank R. Gooding, and his service as a United States Senator from Idaho in the early 20th century. School colors are red, black and white.

== Notable alumni ==
- Stan Pavkov (1934), guard for the Pittsburgh Steelers
- Colston Loveland (2022), tight end for the Chicago Bears
