= Bliss, Idaho =

- City
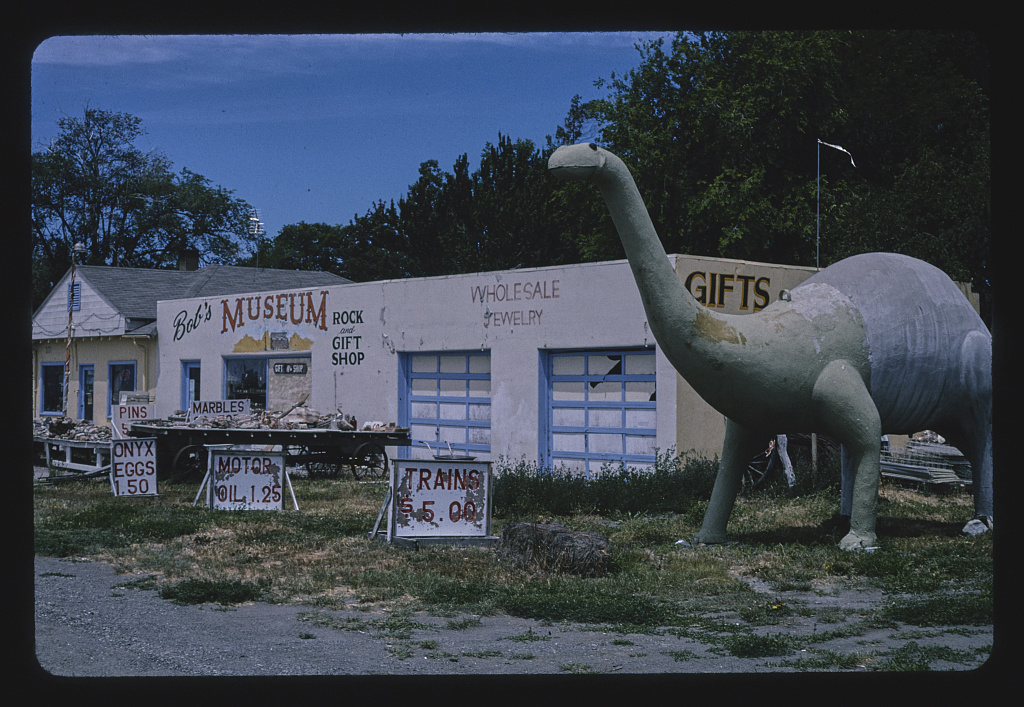
- Bob's Museum Rock and Gift Shop in Bliss

- Location of Bliss in Gooding County, Idaho.
- Coordinates: 42°55′27″N 114°56′53″W
- Country: United States
- State: Idaho
- County: Gooding

Area
  - Total: 0.74 sq mi (1.91 km^{2})
  - Land: 0.74 sq mi (1.91 km^{2})
  - Water: 0 sq mi (0.00 km^{2})
- Elevation: 3,278 ft (999 m)

Population (2020)
  - Total: 258
  - Density: 350/sq mi (135/km^{2})
- Time zone: UTC-7 (Mountain (MST))
  - Summer (DST): UTC-6 (MDT)
- ZIP code: 83314
- Area code: 208
- FIPS code: 16-08470
- GNIS feature ID: 2409864

Bliss is a city in Gooding County, Idaho, United States. The population was 258 at the 2020 census.

== History ==
It has frequently been noted on lists of unusual place names.

It has been documented in a photography book published in 2022 as a "disappearing" town.

== Education ==
Bliss is in the Bliss Joint School District 234 and served by the K-12 Bliss School.

Gooding County is in the catchment area, but not the taxation zone, for College of Southern Idaho.

== Geography ==
According to the United States Census Bureau, the city has a total area of 0.62 square miles (1.61 km^{2}), all of it land.

=== Climate ===
According to the Köppen Climate Classification system, Bliss has a semi-arid climate, abbreviated "BSk" on climate maps.

== Demographics ==
Historical population
Census	Pop.	Note	%±
1950	126		—
1960	91		−27.8%
1970	114		25.3%
1980	208		82.5%
1990	185		−11.1%
2000	275		48.6%
2010	318		15.6%
2020	258		−18.9%
U.S. Decennial Census

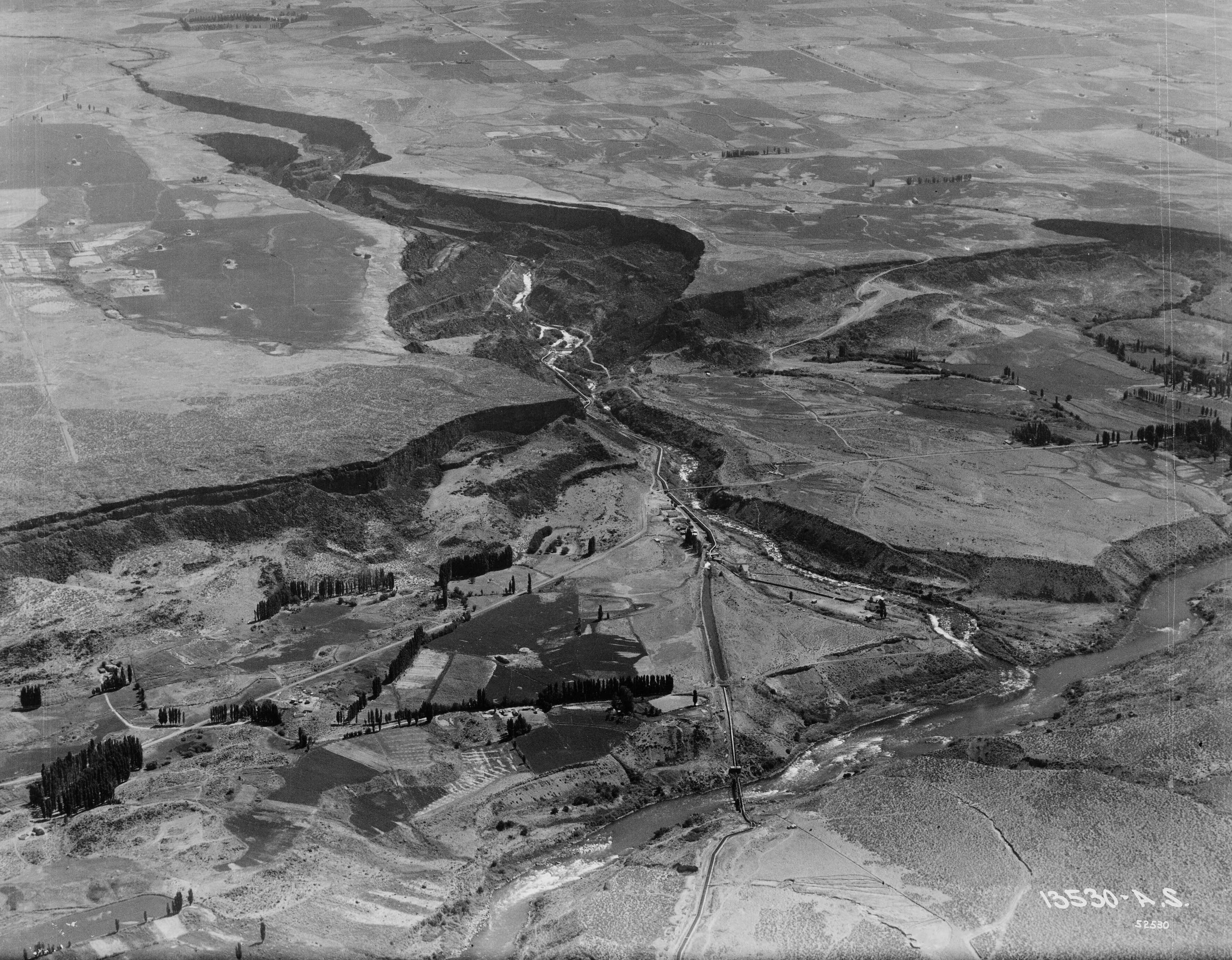
Bliss, 1923

As of 2000 the median income for a household in the city was $25,313, and the median income for a family was $32,500. Males had a median income of $29,821 versus $14,375 for females. The per capita income for the city was $10,731. About 11.5% of families and 12.2% of the population were below the poverty line, including 13.6% of those under the age of eighteen and 4.2% of those 65 or over.

=== 2010 census ===
As of the census of 2010, there were 318 people, 117 households, and 72 families residing in the city. The population density was 512.9 inhabitants per square mile (198.0/km^{2}). There were 138 housing units at an average density of 222.6 per square mile (85.9/km^{2}). The racial makeup of the city was 72.3% White, 0.3% Native American, 2.2% Asian, 23.6% from other races, and 1.6% from two or more races. Hispanic or Latino of any race were 34.6% of the population.

There were 117 households, of which 38.5% had children under the age of 18 living with them, 45.3% were married couples living together, 12.8% had a female householder with no husband present, 3.4% had a male householder with no wife present, and 38.5% were non-families. 33.3% of all households were made up of individuals, and 5.1% had someone living alone who was 65 years of age or older. The average household size was 2.72 and the average family size was 3.65.

The median age in the city was 34.8 years. 28.9% of residents were under the age of 18; 10.1% were between the ages of 18 and 24; 23.7% were from 25 to 44; 29.2% were from 45 to 64; and 8.2% were 65 years of age or older. The gender makeup of the city was 50.9% male and 49.1% female.

== Notable people ==
- Colston Loveland (born 2004), professional American football player. He grew up in Bliss, Idaho, a small community in Gooding County, and attended Gooding High School. Loveland played college football at the University of Michigan, where he was part of the 2023 national championship team. Known for carrying his small-town Idaho roots with pride, he became the highest-drafted tight end of the 2025 NFL draft when he was selected 10th overall by the Chicago Bears.

== See also ==
- List of cities in Idaho
