= Idaho School for the Deaf and the Blind =

Public school in Gooding, Idaho, U.S.

Coordinates: 42.9290°N 114.7112°W

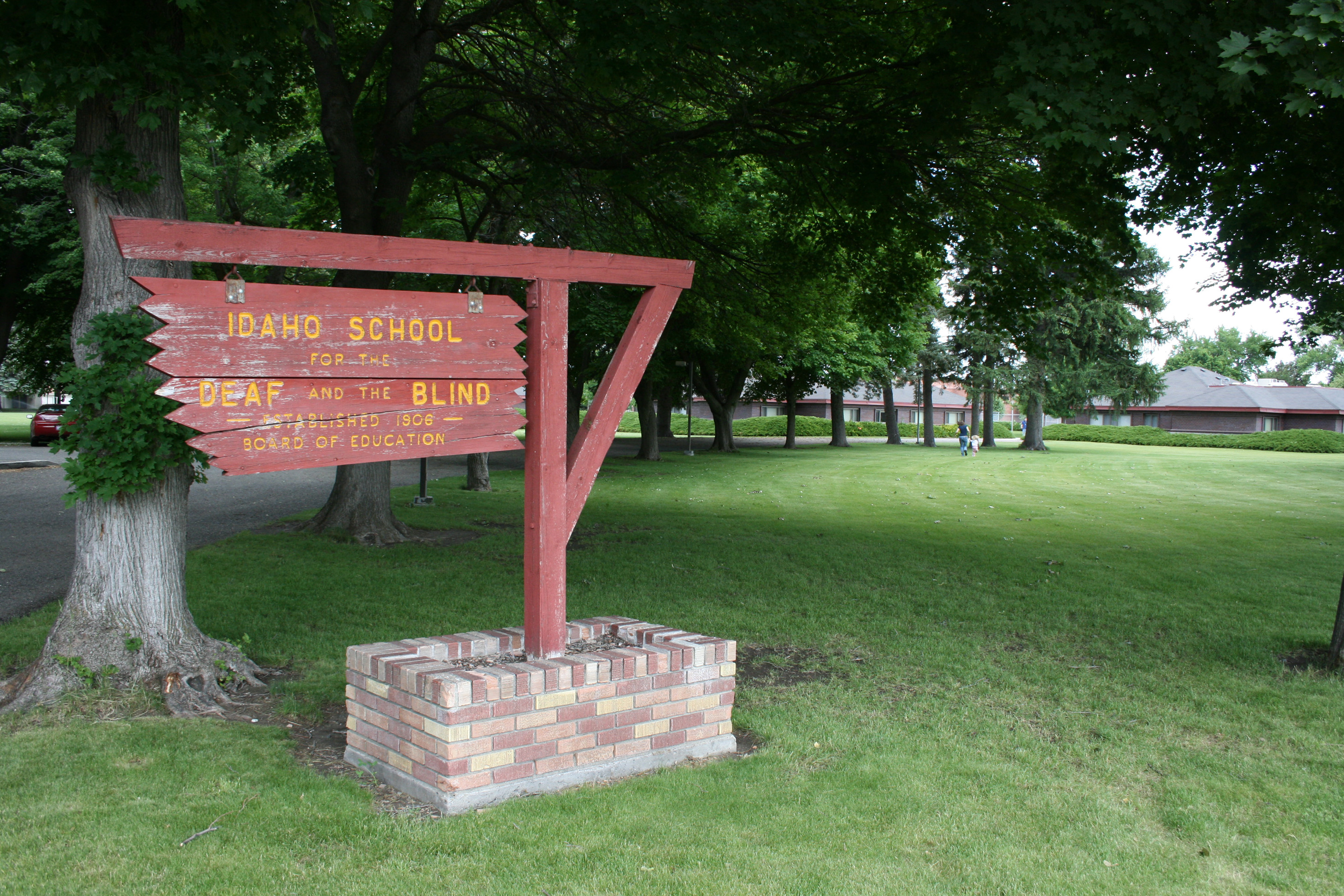
Idaho School for the Deaf and the Blind sign

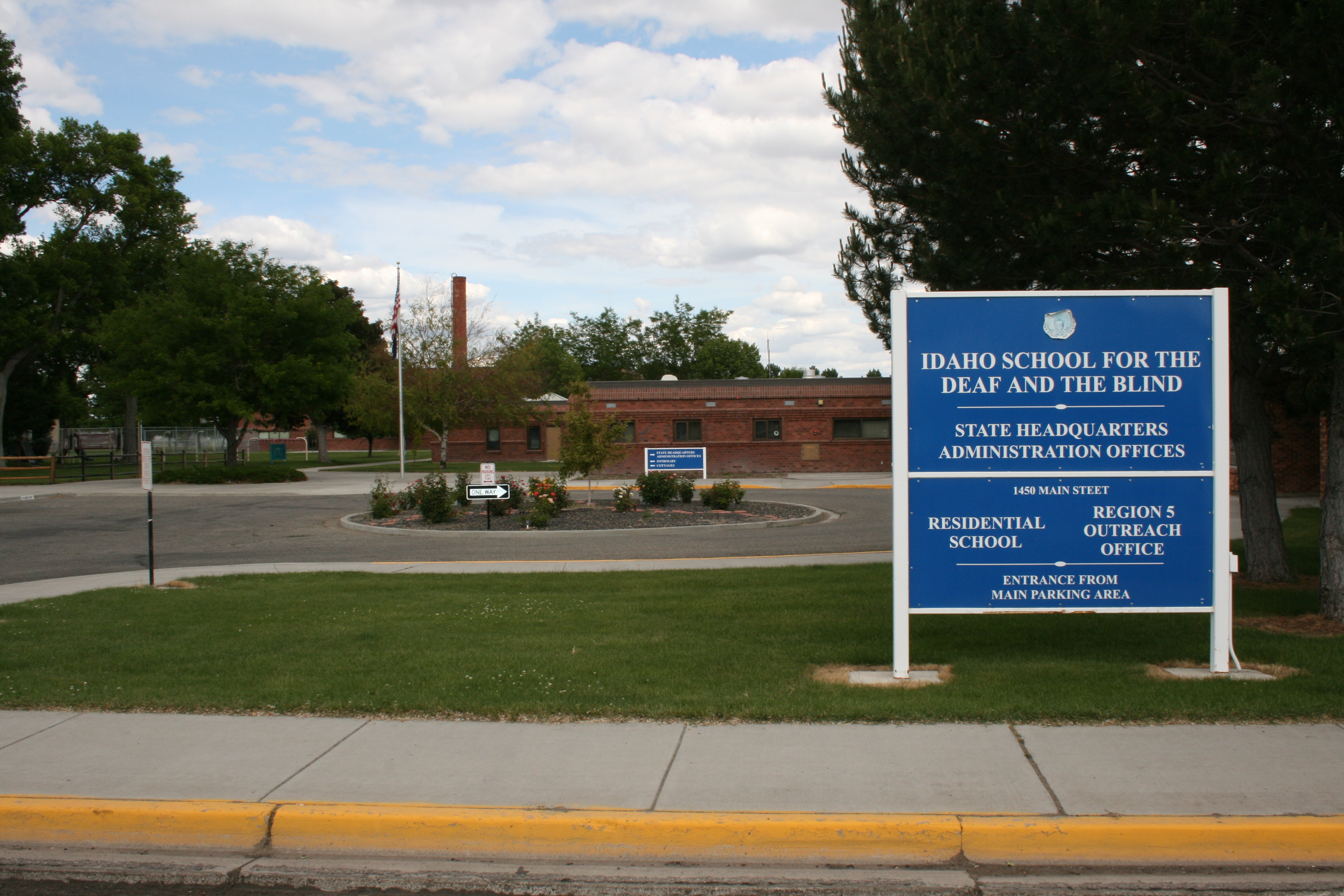
Headquarters

Idaho School for the Deaf and the Blind (ISDB) is a state-operated public school in Gooding, Idaho. It is part of the agency Idaho Educational Services for the Deaf and the Blind (IESDB).

It covers grades Pre-Kindergarten to Grade 12. The school covers a 40-acre (160,000 m^{2}) area and provides dormitories for many of its students and has other facilities, such as a gymnasium and park.

== History ==
On September 12, 1906, the school began operations in a building in Boise that formerly housed another school. A 1908 fire ruined that building.

In 1909 Governor of Idaho Frank Gooding made a proposal to have the school moved to Gooding, a town he was establishing. He ultimately donated the land for the re-establishment of the school. In 1910 the school restarted operations, using a hotel facility, on a rental basis.

In 1956 the student count was 102. That year, Ed Reay became the school's superintendent. A residence for the superintendent opened in 1959. In 1961, the Legislature of Idaho began allowing the school to admit students under the age of 6. A clinic and cafeteria, a residence hall for female students, a swimming pool, an elementary school facility and administration building, and a library and classroom were established in 1962, 1963, 1965, 1968, and 1975, respectively. The total enrollment was up to almost 400 as of August 31, 1977.

Ángel Ramos became the school's superintendent on August 1, 2001. He later wrote a book about a protest.

In 2004 there was a controversy over the education style for the deaf students. Some parents argued that the school should have emphasized more lip reading and speech instead of relying mostly on American sign language.

By 2023 the school had a four day per week schedule.

== Campus ==
In 1977 the campus had 40 acres (16 ha) of area.

== Programs ==
The school had programs tailored for deaf-blind students with the Deaf-Blind Center, established in 1972. The enrollment in the center in 1973 was 15.

== See also ==
- List of boarding schools in the United States
