= Hawaii School for the Deaf and the Blind =

Public school in Hawaii, United States

Coordinates: 21.2729°N 157.8150°W

Information
- Former names: School for Defectives (1914–1918); Ho’olana (1918–1921); Territorial School for the Deaf and the Blind (1921–1949); Diamond Head School for the Deaf and the Blind (1949–1969); Hawaiʻi School for the Deaf and the Blind (1969–1984); Hawaii Center for the Sensory Impaired (1984–1989); Statewide Center for Students with Hearing and Visual Impairments (1989–1995); Hawaii Center for the Deaf and the Blind (1995–2009)
- Established: 1914; 112 years ago
- School district: Hawaii State Department of Education
- Enrollment: 77 (2010)

Hawaiʻi School for the Deaf and the Blind (HSDB) is a public school for deaf and blind children in Honolulu, Hawaii. Operated by the Hawaii Department of Education (HIDOE), it has grades K–12.

All of the teachers are certified in American Sign Language.

== History ==
It opened on April 20, 1914, in the rear of Ka’iulani Elementary School in Kapālama. It was originally known as the School for Defectives but became Ho’olana in 1918. The Territory of Hawaii government purchased the Cecil C. Brown Estate, and the school moved there in September 1918. In 1921, it took the name Territorial School for the Deaf and the Blind, and, in 1949, it became the Diamond Head School for the Deaf and the Blind. It received its current name on September 2, 1969.

In the 1980s, enrollment fell to nine, and Mary Vorsino of the Honolulu Star Advertiser called it "a rocky period". It was renamed to the Hawaii Center for the Sensory Impaired in 1984, Statewide Center for Students with Hearing and Visual Impairments in 1989, then Hawaii Center for the Deaf and the Blind in 1995 before reverting to its current name in 2009.

Dr. Jane Kelleher Fernandes was hired in 1989 to lead the Hawaii School for the Deaf and Blind, then known as the Hawaii Center for the Deaf and Blind. She was the first Deaf female hired to lead an American school for deaf, blind, and deaf-blind students. At the beginning of her service, the school had 7 students. Dr. Fernandes established a strong bilingual school with American Sign Language as primary in and out of the classroom and hired deaf teachers and staff as role models for students. The Gallaudet University Regional Center at Kapiʻolani Community College supported Family Learning Vacations and provided much-needed support for families with deaf and hard-of-hearing children. The Shared Reading Project was launched, bringing deaf role models and literacy development to all families in Hawaii with a deaf child. When her term ended in 1995, the enrollment had grown tenfold to 70 students.

Angel Ramos, a person with a background in deaf education, was hired in 2016. He was the first male principal who was deaf. Ed Chevy, a member of the group "Save Our Angel Ramos" (SOAR), stated that he reversed a decline in the school management. In 2019, HIDOE reassigned Ramos, prompting backlash from the community.

By 2020, there was a bill in the Hawaii Legislature about requiring members of the deaf community to be in the management of the school.

There are 16 equivalent full-time teachers and 1 full-time school counselor.

== Campus ==
The school is on 5 acres (2.0 ha) of land. It is a public school located in Honolulu, HI.

There is a dormitory for students who do not reside on Oahu; Oahu students are also accepted if the school permits it.

== Student body ==
In 2010, it had 77 students, with 60% being low-income and with 20% of them being from islands other than Oahu. The total number of students was about 20% of the total blind, deaf, and deaf-blind students in Hawaii's public schools.

== Academic achievement ==
In 2010, Vorsino of the Honolulu Star Advertiser wrote that there were "disappointing test scores and years of struggling to boost student achievement".

To deal with this, it had an extended learning time program.

== School community ==
Vorsino stated in 2010 that the school had "fierce champions", including parents who prefer this school over inclusion programs in neighborhood schools.

== Notable people ==
- Dorothy Casterline, alumna, linguist, and educator
- Jane Fernandes, former director of the Hawaii School for the Deaf and the Blind
- Ángel Ramos, principal of the Hawaii School for the Deaf and the Blind
