= Gooding, Idaho =

- City
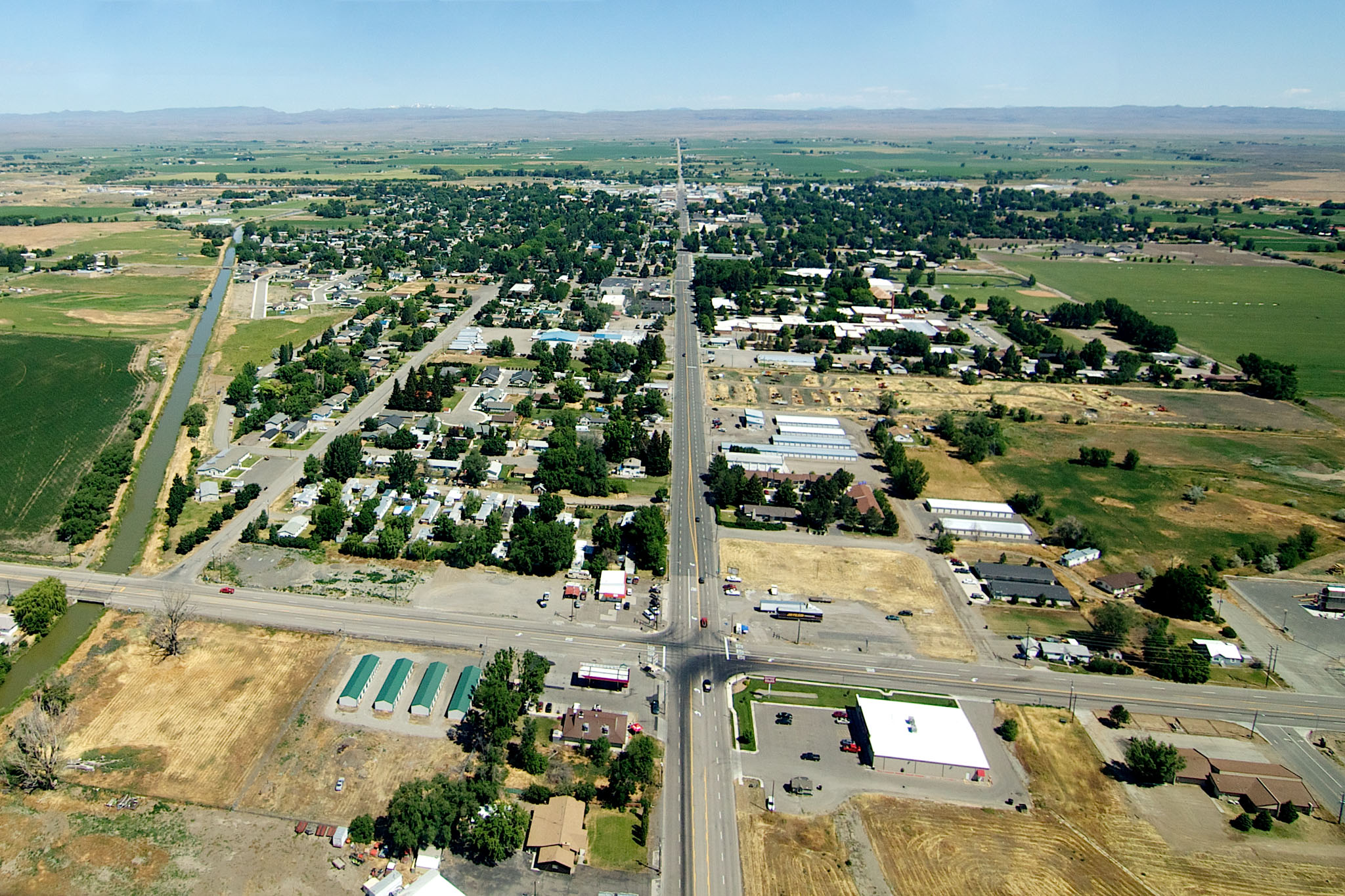
- An aerial view of Gooding, Idaho, from the South. The road in the middle of the photo is Highway 46.

- Location of Gooding in Gooding County, Idaho.

- Location in the United States
- Coordinates: 42°56′14″N 114°42′48″W
- Country: United States
- State: Idaho
- County: Gooding
- Established: 1907
- Incorporated: 1908

Area
  - Total: 1.53 sq mi (3.96 km^{2})
  - Land: 1.52 sq mi (3.93 km^{2})
  - Water: 0.012 sq mi (0.03 km^{2})
- Elevation: 3,570 ft (1,090 m)

Population (2020)
  - Total: 3,707
  - Density: 2,270/sq mi (876.5/km^{2})
- Time zone: UTC-7 (Mountain)
  - Summer (DST): UTC-6 (Mountain)
- ZIP code: 83330
- Area code: 208
- FIPS code: 16-32140
- GNIS feature ID: 2410619
- Website: www.goodingidaho.org

Gooding is the county seat of and the largest city in Gooding County, Idaho, United States. The population was 3,716 at the 2020 census.

The city is named for Frank R. Gooding, a local sheep rancher who became a prominent political figure in Idaho in the early 20th century, serving as both Governor of Idaho and a United States Senator. The original name of Gooding was Toponis.

Gooding is home to the Idaho School for the Deaf and the Blind.

The world's largest factory for barrel cheese, the raw product for processed cheese, is located in Gooding. It has a capacity of 120,000 metric tons per year of barrel cheese and belongs to the Glanbia group. Gooding is also home to Gooding Elementary, Gooding Middle, and Gooding High schools.

== Notable people ==
- Colston Loveland (born 2004), professional American football player. He grew up in Bliss, Idaho, a small community in Gooding County, and attended Gooding High School. Loveland played college football at the University of Michigan, where he was part of the 2023 national championship team. Known for carrying his small-town Idaho roots with pride, he became the highest-drafted tight end of the 2025 NFL draft when he was selected 10th overall by the Chicago Bears.

== Demographics ==
Historical population
Census	Pop.	Note	%±
1910	1,444		—
1920	1,843		27.6%
1930	1,592		−13.6%
1940	2,568		61.3%
1950	3,099		20.7%
1960	2,750		−11.3%
1970	2,599		−5.5%
1980	2,949		13.5%
1990	2,820		−4.4%
2000	3,384		20.0%
2010	3,567		5.4%
2020	3,707		3.9%
2019 (est.)	3,446		−3.4%
U.S. Decennial Census

=== 2020 census ===
As of the 2020 census, Gooding had a population of 3,707. The median age was 34.8 years. 29.2% of residents were under the age of 18 and 16.9% of residents were 65 years of age or older. For every 100 females there were 100.9 males, and for every 100 females age 18 and over there were 97.8 males age 18 and over.

0.0% of residents lived in urban areas, while 100.0% lived in rural areas.

There were 1,400 households in Gooding, of which 33.7% had children under the age of 18 living in them. Of all households, 42.0% were married-couple households, 22.8% were households with a male householder and no spouse or partner present, and 26.8% were households with a female householder and no spouse or partner present. About 31.3% of all households were made up of individuals and 15.7% had someone living alone who was 65 years of age or older.

There were 1,488 housing units, of which 5.9% were vacant. The homeowner vacancy rate was 1.4% and the rental vacancy rate was 3.2%.

Racial composition as of the 2020 census
Race	Number	Percent
White	2,651	71.5%
Black or African American	12	0.3%
American Indian and Alaska Native	52	1.4%
Asian	18	0.5%
Native Hawaiian and Other Pacific Islander	2	0.1%
Some other race	462	12.5%
Two or more races	510	13.8%
Hispanic or Latino (of any race)	1,078	29.1%

=== 2010 census ===
As of the census of 2010, there were 3,567 people, 1,395 households, and 864 families residing in the city. The population density was 2,410.1 inhabitants per square mile (930.5/km^{2}). There were 1,537 housing units at an average density of 1,038.5 units per square mile (401.0 units/km^{2}). The racial makeup of the city was 84.6% White, 0.4% African American, 0.9% Native American, 0.6% Asian, 11.2% from other races, and 2.2% from two or more races. Hispanic or Latino of any race were 22.9% of the population.

There were 1,395 households, of which 35.8% had children under the age of 18 living with them, 44.3% were married couples living together, 12.2% had a female householder with no husband present, 5.4% had a male householder with no wife present, and 38.1% were non-families. 33.0% of all households were made up of individuals, and 19% had someone living alone who was 65 years of age or older. The average household size was 2.53 and the average family size was 3.26.

The median age in the city was 33.5 years. 29.7% of residents were under the age of 18; 9.2% were between the ages of 18 and 24; 24.5% were from 25 to 44; 19% were from 45 to 64; and 17.7% were 65 years of age or older. The gender makeup of the city was 50.0% male and 50.0% female.

=== 2000 census ===
As of the census of 2000, there were 3,384 people, 1,304 households, and 842 families residing in the city. The population density was 2,461.0 inhabitants per square mile (950.2/km^{2}). There were 1,397 housing units at an average density of 1,016.0 units per square mile (392.3 units/km^{2}). The racial makeup of the city was 89.51% White, 0.15% African American, 1.60% Native American, 0.21% Asian, 5.97% from other races, and 2.57% from two or more races. Hispanic or Latino of any race were 14.80% of the population.

There were 1,304 households, out of which 31.3% had children under the age of 18 living with them, 50.5% were married couples living together, 9.7% had a female householder with no husband present, and 35.4% were non-families. 31.5% of all households were made up of individuals, and 18.7% had someone living alone who was 65 years of age or older. The average household size was 2.47 and the average family size was 3.11.

In the city, the population was spread out, with 27.7% under the age of 18, 8.3% from 18 to 24, 24.0% from 25 to 44, 18.8% from 45 to 64, and 21.1% who were 65 years of age or older. The median age was 37 years. For every 100 females, there were 98.8 males. For every 100 females age 18 and over, there were 90.4 males.

The median income for a household in the city was $29,316, and the median income for a family was $33,309. Males had a median income of $24,688 versus $16,926 for females. The per capita income for the city was $13,752. About 12.4% of families and 17.3% of the population were below the poverty line, including 28.8% of those under age 18 and 15.1% of those age 65 or over.

== Geography ==
Gooding is located near the confluence of the Big Wood River and Little Wood River, which merge to form the Malad River.

According to the United States Census Bureau, the city has a total area of 1.49 square miles (3.86 km^{2}), of which, 1.48 square miles (3.83 km^{2}) is land and 0.01 square miles (0.03 km^{2}) is water.

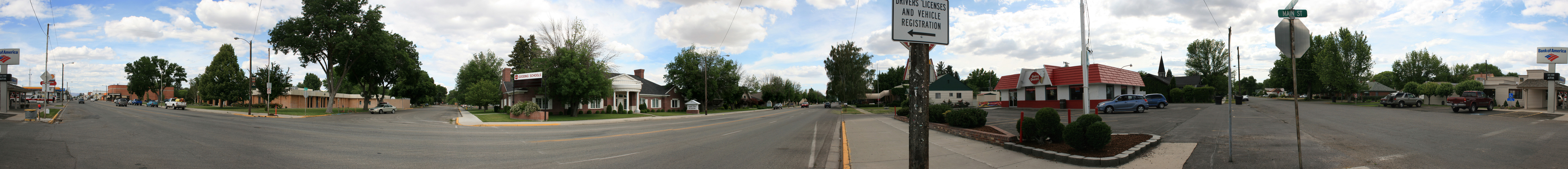
A 360 degree panorama near the center of Gooding, Idaho, 7th and Main (ID-46)

=== Climate ===
According to the Köppen climate classification, Gooding has a cold semi arid climate (BSk).

Climate data for Gooding, Idaho, 1991–2020 simulated normals (3573 ft elevation)
Month	Jan	Feb	Mar	Apr	May	Jun	Jul	Aug	Sep	Oct	Nov	Dec	Year
Mean daily maximum °F (°C)	36.5 (2.5)	42.1 (5.6)	52.7 (11.5)	60.8 (16.0)	70.7 (21.5)	80.2 (26.8)	91.2 (32.9)	89.8 (32.1)	79.2 (26.2)	64.8 (18.2)	48.6 (9.2)	36.9 (2.7)	62.8 (17.1)
Daily mean °F (°C)	28.4 (−2.0)	32.5 (0.3)	41.2 (5.1)	47.7 (8.7)	56.5 (13.6)	64.9 (18.3)	73.8 (23.2)	72.1 (22.3)	62.8 (17.1)	50.5 (10.3)	37.8 (3.2)	28.8 (−1.8)	49.8 (9.9)
Mean daily minimum °F (°C)	20.3 (−6.5)	22.8 (−5.1)	29.5 (−1.4)	34.5 (1.4)	42.4 (5.8)	49.5 (9.7)	56.5 (13.6)	54.7 (12.6)	46.2 (7.9)	36.3 (2.4)	27.1 (−2.7)	20.7 (−6.3)	36.7 (2.6)
Average precipitation inches (mm)	1.29 (32.84)	0.80 (20.44)	1.04 (26.31)	0.93 (23.69)	1.03 (26.09)	0.55 (13.96)	0.13 (3.39)	0.19 (4.76)	0.41 (10.43)	0.79 (20.08)	1.03 (26.15)	1.58 (40.22)	9.77 (248.36)
Average dew point °F (°C)	22.5 (−5.3)	24.3 (−4.3)	27.9 (−2.3)	30.7 (−0.7)	36.3 (2.4)	39.7 (4.3)	41.7 (5.4)	39.9 (4.4)	35.2 (1.8)	31.1 (−0.5)	27.0 (−2.8)	22.8 (−5.1)	31.6 (−0.2)
Source: Prism Climate Group

== Government and infrastructure ==
The Gooding Fire District maintains its fire station in Gooding.

== Education ==
There are six schools based in Gooding; four in the Gooding Joint School District, the North Valley Academy charter school, and the Idaho School for the Deaf and the Blind. Another school, Gooding College, closed in 1938.

College of Southern Idaho maintains a Gooding Center. Gooding County is in the catchment area, but not the taxation zone, for College of Southern Idaho.

There is also a public library.

=== Gooding Joint School District ===
The Gooding Joint School District operates three schools: Gooding Elementary School, Gooding Middle School, and Gooding High School.

The district is mostly in Gooding County, and it has a portion in Lincoln County.

There are approximately 1200 students in the district. It ranks 43rd in size amongst the 114 school districts in Idaho.

The Gooding Joint School District was ranked in fourth place (in the small district category) on the Digital School Districts Survey, for its "use of technology to govern the district [and to] communicate with students, parents and the community."

Gooding School District was the first district in the nation to win the HealthierUS Challenge "Gold Award of Distinction."

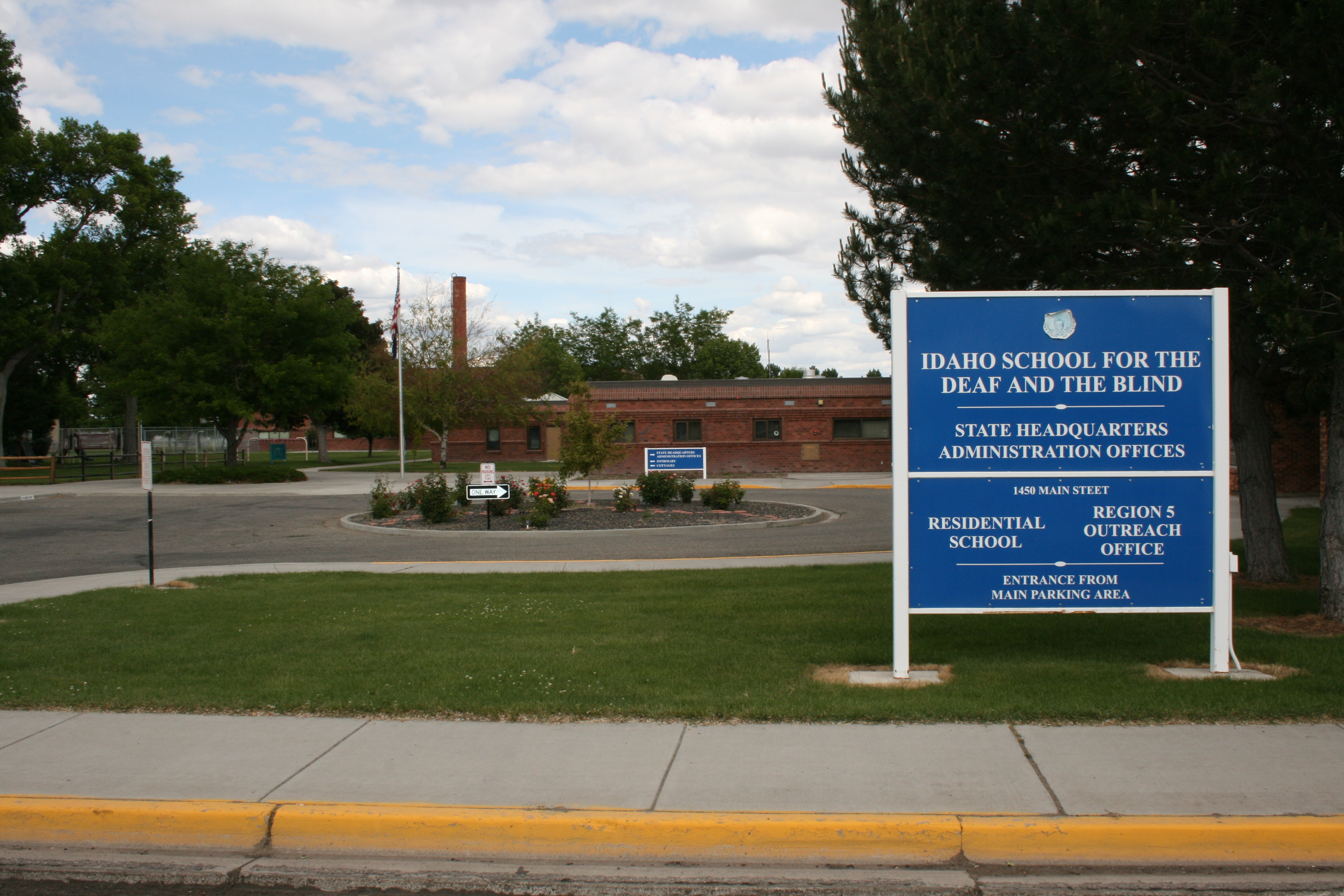
The main entrance and administration offices of the ISDB

=== North Valley Academy ===
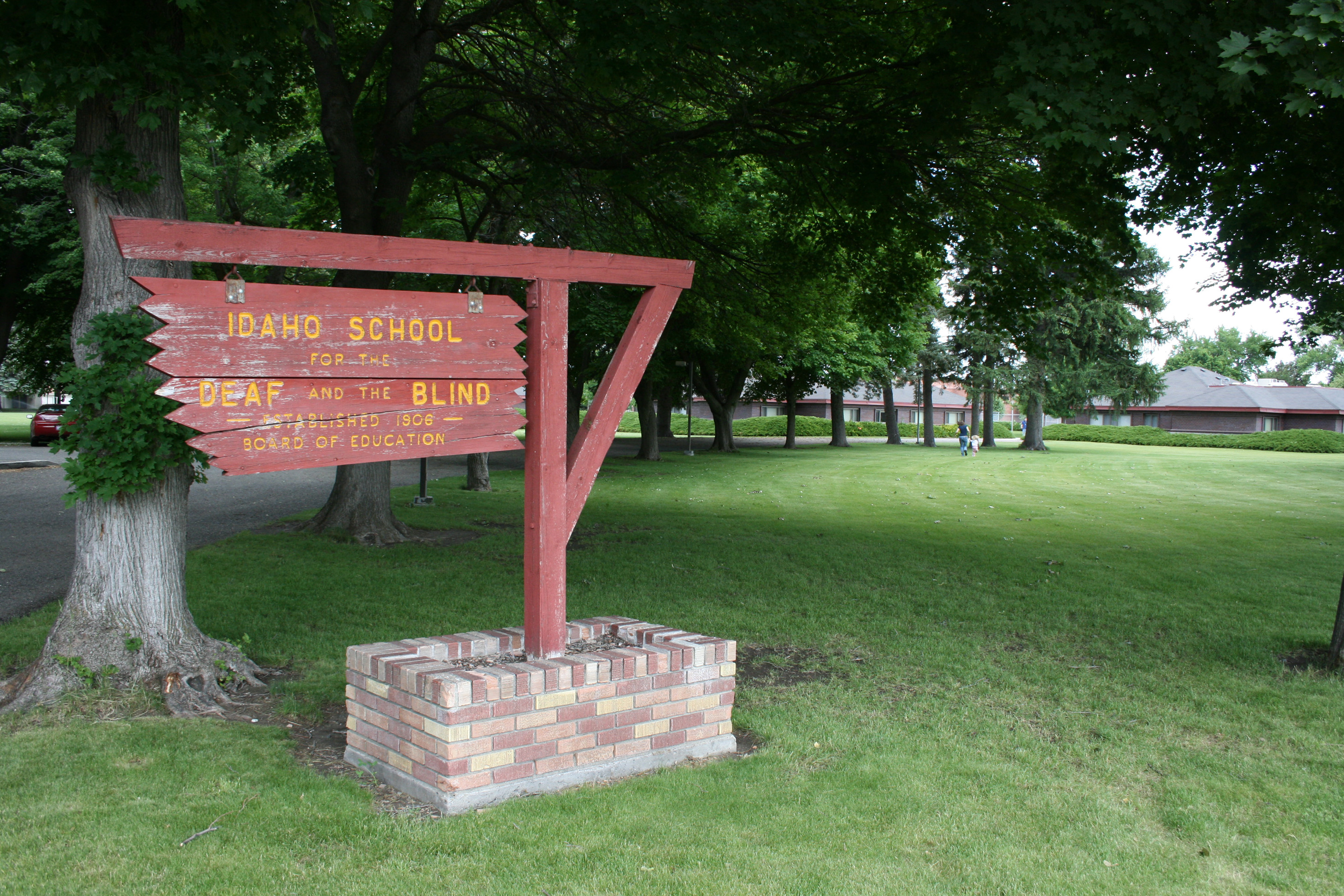
The grounds and some of the dormitories at the ISDB

The North Valley Academy charter school was approved December 20, 2007. Kindergarten through eighth grade started in the 2008–2009 school year, grades 9-12 began in the 2009–2010 school year.

=== Idaho School for the Deaf and the Blind ===
The Idaho School for the Deaf and the Blind (ISDB) was first established in 1906 in Boise and operated there until it burned down on December 8, 1908. The Idaho Legislature passed an act on March 16, 1909, establishing a permanent state school. Governor Frank Gooding donated land for the ISDB so it was moved to Gooding and started accepting students in September 1910.

The school covers a 40-acre (160,000 m^{2}) area and provides dormitories for many of its students and has other facilities, such as a gymnasium and park.

=== Gooding College ===
Gooding College operated in the city from 1917 (109 years ago) to 1938 (88 years ago), offering high school and college courses. The school's largest enrollment was 209 students, in 1928. Buildings of the college were added to the National Register of Historic Places in 1983, listed as "Gooding College Campus". The surviving building of the campus, which dates to 1920, became a tuberculosis hospital in 1946, and was later converted into an inn.

== See also ==
- Gooding Milner canal
