= American Sign Language literature =

Aspect of American literature

American Sign Language literature (ASL literature) is one of the most important shared cultural experiences in the American deaf community. Literary genres initially developed in residential Deaf institutes, such as American School for the Deaf in Hartford, Connecticut, which is where American Sign Language developed as a language in the early 19th century. There are many genres of ASL literature, such as narratives of personal experience, poetry, cinematographic stories, folktales, translated works, original fiction and stories with handshape constraints. Authors of ASL literature use their body as the text of their work, which is visually read and comprehended by their audience viewers. In the early development of ASL literary genres, the works were generally not analyzed as written texts are, but the increased dissemination of ASL literature on video has led to greater analysis of these genres.

Many cultural communities develop their own folk traditions, and the Deaf community is no exception. Such traditions help to solidify the cultural identity of the group, and help educate each subsequent generation of the community's shared cultural values. Susan Rutherford notes that these types of shared stories are especially important to minority communities who have faced oppression from the majority culture, as the Deaf community has. Through folklore and other forms of storytelling, the Deaf community is able to both establish and affirm its cultural identity so its members are able to develop their sense of self. ASL literature often emphasizes experiences common to the Deaf community, both in regard to their Deaf identity and to their status as a minority group.

== Origins and history ==
=== Influence of Deaf institutes on ASL literature ===
American Sign Language (ASL) is the shared language of the Deaf and Hard of Hearing community in North America. Membership to this community is based primarily on shared cultural values, including a shared signed language. Those who are physically deaf or hard of hearing but do not share the same language and cultural values are not considered to be members of the Deaf community. Around 95% of deaf children are born to hearing parents who are unfamiliar with the Deaf community, so deaf children are often not exposed to the cultures and traditions of the Deaf community in their home environment. Schools for Deaf children, known as Deaf institutes, are typically the environment in which Deaf children are introduced to their community's culture, including ASL literature.

The first such institute, the American School for the Deaf (ASD) in Hartford, Connecticut, was established in 1817 by Thomas Gallaudet and Laurent Clerc (then called the American Asylum for the Education of the Deaf and Dumb). Since ASD was established as a residential school, the Deaf students who lived there created a new linguistic community as local, regional sign languages from around the country mixed with the French Sign Language taught by Clerc and led to the development of ASL as a language in its own right. The community that formed at ASD was such a successful intellectual community that other Deaf institutes began to open around the country anywhere there was a large enough Deaf population. This allowed the Deaf community to establish its own subculture, separate from the mainstream hearing culture, and develop as a linguistic minority.

The rise in Deaf institutes around the country led to an increased number of educated and literate Deaf individuals. This led to the development of ASL storytelling traditions in Deaf institutes. During the early days of Deaf education, ASL had not yet been recognized as a fully developed language, and therefore was not considered a suitable language modality for literary composition. This resulted in many Deaf individuals writing works in written English, which was the primary language of instruction at the time. At the same time, ASL literary forms were beginning to develop as the Deaf community began to tell each other stories in their own vernacular. This includes works translated from English into ASL as well as original narratives.ASL stories spread across different regions in America when different Deaf institutes gathered for events, such as sports. This process allows budding storytellers to practice their craft in front of new audiences. Following their school years, Deaf community members from different schools may see each other again at Deaf community gatherings, where storytellers may be called on to perform their narratives.

=== Earliest film recordings of ASL literature ===
Despite the success of Deaf education during the first part of the 19th century, by the 1860s the education system saw a shift in which the hearing community began to introduce the Oral method of educating Deaf students, which emphasized a speech-only approach to education and did not allow ASL in the classroom. The primary belief at the time is that this would help Deaf individuals integrate into society more easily. In 1880, a conference was held in Milan in which educators made a final decision that speech was to be the primary teaching method in the classroom. From then through the mid-20th century Deaf students would be punished to discourage communication through sign. Despite the suppression of ASL in Deaf education, it was still a common means of communication in dormitories, playgrounds and Deaf families. Following the introduction of the Oral method, the National Association of the Deaf (NAD) recorded a film project from 1913 through 1920 out of fear that ASL would not survive. George Veditz oversaw the project and recorded the first film,The Preservation of the Sign Language. The project sought to record and preserve the words of Deaf individuals who had a strong sense of Deaf cultural identity. The film recordings included lectures, poems, stories and songs all of which comprise ASL literary genres. One of documented storytellers, John B. Hotchkiss, filmed a series of stories called Memories of Old Hartford about his time as a student at ASD in the 1860s. From his recorded memories, we know that ASL storytellers, and therefore at least some modern ASL literary genres, date back to at least the 1860s.

=== Influence of Deaf community on ASL literature ===
As the Deaf community developed in Deaf institutes, families and clubs, the community's cultural traditions and stories have been passed from one generation to the next through something akin to the "oral" traditions of spoken languages. In this context, "oral" refers to the sharing of culture through interactions with other members of a cultural community. Folklore and narrative traditions are included in the types of cultural interactions that are passed from person to person in the Deaf community. There is also a high value placed on an open exchange of information, since Deaf individuals cannot incidentally overhear information the way that hearing individuals are able to. Therefore, storytellers may be selected for their ability to share knowledge in addition to their storytelling abilities. Individuals who have been approved by the community as performers are who Ben Bahan refers to as "Smooth Signers", which he defines as "someone who as a language artist can weave a story so smoothly that even complex utterances appear simple, yet beautiful". These storytellers provide a sense of community for their Deaf peers and help perpetuate common cultural values.

Large gatherings of the Deaf community are common in modern-day Deaf culture, such as conventions or festivals, and they are required for ASL literature to take form. If the Deaf community gathers in small groups, it is very rarely a productive means of creating and perpetuating ASL literature. One example of a successful gathering of the Deaf community was the Deaf Way: An International Festival and Conference on the Language, Culture, and History of Deaf People. It was hosted by Gallaudet University from 9–14 July 1989, included more than 500 presentations, workshops, artistic events and performances, and had over 5,000 attendees from a total of 76 countries, including the United States. Gatherings such as these allow for the proliferation of ASL literature and the "oral" dissemination of new works. Members of the Deaf community often leave the festival and share the new works with their own friends and family, and each shared iteration of a work may differ slightly from the original, which results in multiple versions of stories being passed through the community. It is common for Deaf community members to gather socially in their everyday lives, outside of large festival gatherings, sharing and dispersing their own personal narrative stories and traditional or popular ASL stories.

=== Influence of technology on ASL literature ===
Since the first recordings of ASL literature by NAD in the early twentieth century, recordings of ASL literature on film have affected the storytelling tradition. One of the most striking ways that film has changed ASL literature is by making it static. When works of literature are passed orally from person to person, they may change slightly with each performance, but when they are recorded on film, they are frozen in their original form. This has had the effect of distancing performers from audiences, so there is a loss of dynamic interaction between the two. On the other hand, this development allows an audience to view a work of ASL literature long after it has been performed, so it is less likely to be lost to history. Veditz, who led the NAD film project from 1913 to 1920, was in part motivated by his desire to be able to view the signs of Deaf community members who had died, and to preserve ASL in its early 20th century form. Film technology has increased the reach of ASL literature to a much wider audience. Anyone can watch works of ASL at their convenience, regardless of geographic location. Film has influenced ASL literature in other ways as well, such as allowing authors to be more experimental, affecting the way literary genres are presented, allowing audiences to analyze ASL texts in new ways, standardizing the ASL language across geographic regions, promoting ASL literacy, and solidifying a shared Deaf cultural identity.

== Literacy ==
Historically, literacy has been understood as the ability to read or write. The spread of ASL literature has challenged the idea that language users can only be literate in languages with written forms. This concept is related to the idea of multiliteracies, a term coined by the New London Group in 1996, based on the belief that literacy is created through social constructs rather than written representations of language. They felt that the traditional definition of literacy was no longer adequate to represent the types of literacies that proliferated through an increased global and technologically advanced society. The way individuals were creating meaning was based on their cultural upbringing, and very different from others they interacted with. For some communities, a visual mode of communication constitutes language, rather than the alphabetical representations of languages that have traditionally defined literacy. For the American Deaf community, ASL provides a form of literacy to those who do not have access to a spoken language as their first language. If the definition of literacy is limited spoken/written languages, then many Deaf individuals would be considered illiterate. Access to signed languages allows Deaf individuals to be included in literate communities. It allows written literature to be translated into a language accessible to the Deaf community, aids in the education Deaf students by helping them learn to read printed text, and allows Deaf individuals to pass on their culture to the next generation.

If the definition of literacy applies to all individuals who are educated and have knowledge of the world around them, then it becomes possible to be literate in any language, regardless of whether it is spoken or signed. Literacy allows an individual to derive meaning from language and to make inferences about the world around them. As literacy skills develop, so too do cognitive abilities in such a way that literate individuals can begin making inferences from language by applying their knowledge of the world to what is being said. ASL does not have a written form as spoken languages do, so it requires a knowledgeable signer to view a work of ASL literature and move past the literal meaning of the work and convey a deeper meaning. The ability of the narrator to convey this deeper meaning and for the audience to infer deeper meaning in an ASL text requires a high level of linguistic skill for all individuals involved.

This ASL e-book of "The Night Before Christmas" was developed to support literacy in Deaf children

With the idea of literacy comes the idea of the "text", which has historically been used to refer to language in its written form. ASL and other signed languages do not have a written form, so this definition of "text" has been expanded to include any language, spoken or signed, that has been preserved to read or view again, such as the text of a spoken language or the video text of a signed language. Any language recorded on paper or video allows its viewers to analyze its content and meaning, which itself is an act of literacy. The cognitive literacy skills that a language user can develop by reading and analyzing a text on a written page can also be developed by viewing and analyzing ASL recorded on video. The increased access that ASL users have to video-recorded content on the internet is leading to an increase in their ability to analyze ASL texts, and therefore a rise in ASL literacy. Prior to works of ASL being recorded on video, there was no practice of analyzing or seriously studying the works, but this has changed with the increased proliferation of recorded ASL.

The concept of multiliteracies can be put into pedagogical practice in the classroom by providing students with non-traditional means of engaging with educational materials based on their identities and personal educational needs. In the context of Deaf education, video technology can be used not only to disseminate and analyze works of ASL literature, but to increase literacy in the classroom by providing students with visual feedback on their own work. By allowing students to watch a video playback of themselves, they are able to develop their own language fluency by seeing which of their poetic or narrative works are more or less successful. This process allows students to develop their own cognitive abilities and begin exploring deeper literary analyses of their own work.

== Features ==
=== Cinematographic technique ===
Joseph Davis uses cinematographic techniques to show what happens to a Deaf-Blind Ninja

Cinematographic techniques can appear in any genre of ASL storytelling. Bernard Bragg was the first Deaf performer to note the similarities between the grammars of sign languages and film. He suggests that the vocabulary of film is so similar to that of sign languages that it should be used to describe and analyze them. He notes that sign languages are not linear as spoken/written languages are. Rather, they cut between different views – close up, normal view, long shot, etc. – just as films are edited together. The signers assume the role of a film camera, directing and varying the angle of vision that the audience receives. The device that allows ASL performers to create the illusion of varying distances of camera angle are the Classifiers that are prevalent in the language, which are used to visually demonstrate movement and action, size and shape, or states of being of people and objects. Classifiers allow signers to use their hands, bodies and the signing space to visually define scenes and change the scale of what they are describing from distances ranging from microscopically close to distantly far.

Film can be analyzed using its own grammatical structure, so applying the same grammatical analysis to ASL literary genres adds depth to the language. Manny Hernandez, an ASL performer, has advocated for a cinematic lexicon to be developed alongside traditional linguistic analyses of ASL literature. He argues that the analyses applied to written/spoken languages is not adequate to capture what he calls the "visual-spatial-kinetic properties of signed languages". Similarly to Bragg, he points out that the signer controls the field of view as a film camera does, as well as tracking and panning across scenes. Individual shots within film are flexible in their length and angle of view, and are stitched together through an editing process. The same can be said for ASL literary genres, that cut between different scenes and characters, interweaving dialogue and action.

Classifier stories are one example of a genre that make use of cinematic techniques of ASL storytelling. By utilizing the various types of classifiers, they naturally incorporate cinematic techniques by showing objects and action at varying scale. While cinematic technique can be applied to any ASL genre, there is a genre specifically dedicated to these techniques, called Cinematic Stories, which are often signed recreations of movie scenes. Two styles of Cinematic stories are either "live action" or "animation" style. Manny Hernandez's story "Durassic Park", which depicts scenes from Jurassic Park through cinematic technique is an example of the live action style. Animation style is influenced by cartoon animation, and uses classifier to describe events such as one's eyes popping out of their head. This is often employed in Personification techniques, in which signers use a portion of their body to bring an object to life and show its emotions.

==== Examples of cinematic devices ====
- Camera angles such as Straight Angle Shot or Eye-Level Shot: The individual signing faces forward, signing as if a camera were filming at the signers eye level.
- Cuts such as role-shifting to portray dialogue: Usually used to portray differences in characters in stories or to move from scene to scene. The signer may move their body from facing left to facing right to show this change in dialogue.
- Distance shots or shot sizes such as close ups: Used to establish distances between objects or characters within a story. Signs may move from framing a whole place to a specific location or object within that place.
- Mobile Framing or Following Shot: Mimics the movement of cameras in film. This helps set the pace of which objects or individuals within the story are moving. This technique can also be used to emphasize certain scenes within a story such, for example, using slow motion to depict an action.
- Lens zoom: Similar to lens zooms in film, hands move forwards or away from the audience to demonstrate an object or individual becoming larger or smaller with respect to the perspective of the story.

=== Visual Vernacular ===
Visual Vernacular is a form of ASL performance developed by Bernard Bragg that draws heavily on cinematic techniques. He chose the name because it uses the vernacular language of cinematic storytelling. Visual vernacular is an expressive and artistic form of sign language storytelling. The storyteller uses visual techniques such as role-shifting, facial expressions, and miming to tell a story in a visually expressive way. The use of iconic signs, or signs that look like what they represent, in combination with role-shifting and other techniques used in visual vernacular allow stories to be universally understood. Even if the story is told by a signer who signs in ASL, this story could theoretically be understood by viewers who use international sign languages, and even hearing individuals who understand no sign language. Rather than simply telling a story, a sign performer uses visual vernacular in order to become the story through role shifting and miming techniques, translating the story into the visual space. Visual Vernacular is an important tool in ASL literature, particularly in poetry that is performed in front of an audience. Visual Vernacular is used to portray the scene in the poem and to use very detailed visual methods to let the audience know what is happening in the poem. It is this complex visual nature of the poetry that often makes it impossible to directly translate into English from ASL.

=== Personification ===
Christopher Rawling's "An Incredible Journey of an Ordinary Egg" uses personification to show the egg's emotions

Personification in sign language involves using the storyteller's body part to represent an object in the story. Doing so allows the object to "come alive" in the story. A very common example of personification in sign language stories is using the storyteller's head to represent round objects such as different types of balls. As the story is acted out, the storyteller's head is the ball, and the storyteller can act out emotions that the ball may feel throughout the story, thus personifying the ball. This often occurs in the "animation style" of cinematographic technique.

== Genres ==
=== Poetry ===
The 1980s was a time of innovation for Deaf poets. It was at this time that poets such as Ella Mae Lentz and Clayton Valli began to compose original poetry in ASL, as opposed to ASL translations of English literature that the preceding generation had produced. This was paralleled by the ASL poetry scene that formed during the same decade at the National Technical Institute for the Deaf (NTID) in Rochester, New York, which lasted until about 1991 when the poets moved their separate ways. Keeping with the community traditions of Deaf storytellers, older more experienced poets were influential on the younger generation of poets, and all poets openly exchanged feedback with each other. Through this process, Deaf poets developed through their own natural talent and their exchanges with more experienced poets. There was also an important exchange of ideas between hearing poets, such as Allen Ginsberg and Jim Cohn, and Deaf poets in the Rochester community. One of the most notable exchanges was Deaf poet Patrick Graybill acting out an image of a "hydrogen jukebox" from Allen Ginsberg's poem "Howl" during a seminar in 1984. Upon being asked why he chose the word 'hydrogen', Ginsburg explained that he wanted the apocalyptic imagery of the hydrogen bomb to work as a metaphor for the arrival of rock and roll music. Graybill's visual depiction in ASL of a "hydrogen jukebox" successfully brought the image to life, which is what Ginsberg was trying to accomplish through the words of his Beat poetry. Sutton-Spence notes that the energy of the poets at NTID in the 1980s was akin to Ginsberg's imagery, creating their own "ASL Poetry hydrogen jukebox".

Translating sign language poetry into spoken or written language is extremely difficult, as it is impossible to translate the movements and facial expressions and the story being told by the poet's body itself into words. In sign language, it is often said that poetry is articulated through the poet's body, and the poem is performed rather than simply signed. ASL poets have more of a physical connection to their work due to the inherent need to express their works through their body. The poet-performer is never separated from their creations because they are always in front of the audience, whether in person or on video. Heidi M. Rose compares ASL poets to performance artists, in the sense that both create artistic works expressed through their body. Both genres are often autobiographical and do not separate the artists from the works of art they create. In performance art, artists and audiences have a different relationship with one another than in other art forms; artists perform and develop their sense-of-self and audiences have a deeper understanding of the artist.

Cynthia Peters makes a similar comparison between ASL poetry and spoken oral poetry traditions. Spoken oral poetry is not simply read aloud, but rather experienced in a community setting. Audiences gather to participate in a group experience, and oral poets create works that appeal to their particular audience and relate to them using their bodies, expressions and props. Similarly to the performance art genres discussed by Rose, oral poetry is rife with aspects infused by the performer that cannot be communicated in writing. Each iteration of the poem varies from the last performance, and it is impossible to define one authoritative version. Furthermore, given that an oral poet is usually a member of the community to whom they are performing, other observers who lack the group's cultural knowledge may miss nuances that the target audience understands. Peters notes that oral poetry in spoken languages is growing less common, but due to the unwritten nature of ASL poetry, alongside its tendency to be created and performed in front of an audience, it is a flourishing oral art form. In relation to ASL poetry, this raises the difficult question of authorship, and how another performer relates to a work that was originally performed by someone else's body. The performer needs to have a grasp on each nuanced movement used by the original author and develop their own interpretation. Rose notes that ASL artists have greater artistic authority over their own works than artists of other genres, and even when other artists perform ASL poems there is still an element of the original author in the piece.

Sign language poetry is significantly different from poetry for spoken languages, but uses some techniques that are parallel. For example, alliteration of consonant sounds is often important in spoken language poetry, but a form of alliteration, the repetition of handshapes and other features, is also appreciated as an artistic feature in a parallel way for signed poetry.

Some well known deaf poets are Clayton Valli, Ella Mae Lentz, and Patrick Graybill, who are all featured on the 1990 video series, Poetry in Motion: Original Works in ASL. In the early 1990s, Calyton Valli was the first person to study ASL poetry with the intent of trying to figure out how to define a 'line' in ASL poetry, just as one might in a spoken/written poetic genre. He began by studying the phonetic features of ASL such as handshape, movement, palm orientation and nonmanual markers to determine whether or not ASL poetry was able to rhyme as spoken languages do. Due to ASL having multiple phonological features that occur simultaneously, ASL signs are able to rhyme in several ways at once, which spoken languages cannot accomplish. For instance, in Valli's poem "Snowflake", the signs for LEAVES-FALL and GRASS-WITHER both phrases use two hands in the 5 handshape that move in a downward motion with a furrowed brow, creating three simultaneous rhymes. Bauman has tried to find other features to define the concept of 'line' in ASL poetry, rather than focusing on phonological line breaks that limit ASL poetry to being analyzed in the same manner as spoken languages. He notes that the visual and kinetic nature of ASL allows 'line' to be analyzed in terms of the body's movements through space, so that 'line' is no longer limited to a strict left-to-right direction. He applies the Oxford English Dictionary's definition of line, "a direction and course of movement" directly to how one might analyze the visual line of ASL poetry. His method of analysis includes looking at how cinematographic techniques and visual vernacular are woven into the texture of ASL poetry, and abandon phonological methods of analysis in favor of defining how Deaf artists organize their signing space.

=== Folktales ===
Ben Bahan defines folktales in American Sign Language literature as stories that have long existed in the community without a known origin. Folklore help create a common literary foundation that unite Deaf individuals.

Susan Rutherford and Simon Carmel are the most prominent researchers of ASL folklore documenting stories in which members of the Deaf community connect with each other despite obstacles that would prevent them from doing so.

=== Narratives of personal experience ===
Personal experiences account for a large portion of the stories told by the Deaf Community. These personal experiences are often told in order to create a sense of a shared experience among individuals as well as highlighting the individual experience of the storyteller. Narratives of personal experience also allow for the combination of several stories, further tying members of the Deaf Community together.

=== Percussion signing ===
Percussion signing is a type of sign language performance that involves signing along to a specific beat, somewhat like a song in spoken language. Drums are a commonly known percussion instrument. The name percussion signing comes from the fact that this type of signing resembles beats like those of a drum in a song. Percussion signed songs are often performed like chants or cheers, and are common in group settings. For example, one commonly known example of percussion signing is the "Bison Song", otherwise known as the Gallaudet University fight song. Signing in this manner has a whimsical and musical feel to it that makes it so unique.

=== Handshape stories ===
ABC stories intermingle the alphabetical phonetic system of the English language with the phonological aspects of ASL. The structure of the story is set up by structuring it around the alphabet in order to determine which ASL handshapes to use in the story, and the story itself is performed in ASL. ABC stories are always signed in either alphabetical order, with each consecutive handshape following the letter sequence of the alphabet. For example, the "A" handshape may represent someone knocking on a door, "B" a door opening and "C" someone searching around the room. In some circumstances, the "N", "H", "U" and "V" handshapes are interchangeable because they are all formed with a two-fingered handshape. The same is true for the "M" and "W" handshapes, which are formed with a three-fingered handshape. Similarly, the "K" and "P" handshapes are the same, and the same can be said for the "U", "H" and "N" handshapes, albeit with different palm orientations. ABC stories allow for signers to focus primarily on the handshape of these letters, so as not to worry about palm orientation in the telling of the story. Ben Bahan notes that there are several common themes of ABC stories, but Susan Rutheford observed that the content of ABC stories are not their primary focus; rather, the performance skill of the signer is the most important aspect. The genre is usually introduced to Deaf children as young adolescents by older peers or family members.

Number stories are similar to ABC stories in that they must be told in numerical order, using the '1' handshape first, then the '2' handshape, etc. They must be constructed using the number handshapes in succession to tell a story. These stories are slightly more flexible, as can vary in length based on how high the teller wishes to count.

Plays on fingerspelled words construct a story made from the handshapes representing the English letters of a chosen word, following the letter sequence in order. Each of the letters is usually used to illustrate a characterizing feature of the chosen word, blending the handshapes with ASL signs and gestures. Susan Rutherford notes that in contrast to ABC Stories, the content of fingerspelled word stories has more significant meaning. A variation on this genre uses the letters of a word or phrase to visually represent the word, rather than using aspects of ASL signs. For instance, the phrase FALLING LEAF in the play My Third Eye is signed from high to low locations in the signing space and each letter twists and turns to demonstrate a leaf drifting to the ground.

Stories with handshape type constraints have a more limited set of handshapes. The storyteller selects which handshapes will be included in the story, and must use only these handshapes. The story must follow the original intent of which handshapes are included, making deviations only as necessary and within reason, and they need to create a coherent story within these limitations.

=== Translated works and original fiction ===
ASL translation of "The Tortoise and the Hare"

Translated works often take well-known stories in print literature and translate them into American Sign Language, subconsciously giving them characteristics of Deaf individuals or purposefully assigning protagonists as Deaf and antagonists as hearing.

With the increase of video recording technology ASL original fiction has been able to be performed and preserved more easily than in the past. ASL fiction can appear in short story, novel, or novella form.

A complete translation of the New World Translation has been produced in American Sign Language by Jehovah's Witnesses. It can be viewed online and can be downloaded as a set of M4V files. It is also available in the JW Sign Language application in App stores.

== Theatrical companies and performances ==
=== National Theatre of the Deaf ===
The National Theatre of the Deaf (NTD) first began in 1967. Prior to the NTD, deaf theatre consisted of three small, amateur theatre groups, and local deaf clubs where individuals could perform mime shows, read poems, or where captioned films were shown. The deaf world was lacking a platform where they could express themselves and perform. The idea for NTD came from the Broadway production of The Miracle Worker, the story of Helen Keller, who was blind and deaf. Inspired by seeing sign language on the stage, actress Anne Bancroft, who played Anne Sullivan in the production of The Miracle Worker, joined with psychologist Edna Simon Levine to attempt bring deaf theater to the stage.

The National Theatre for the Deaf's Mission Statement is: "To present theatrical work of the highest quality, performing in the unique style we created through blending American Sign Language and Spoken Word". The NTD provides an organization where deaf, hard of hearing, and even hearing actors, actresses, and playwrights can perform and train. The National Theatre for the Deaf became a "catalyst for change" that proved the worth and talent of deaf individuals and artists while showcasing the beauty of sign language on the stage. Many of the NTD productions are both spoken and signed at the same time, allowing Deaf actors to perform in their natural manner of communication while also encouraging hearing audiences to come experience this type of theatre.

=== Deaf West Theatre ===
Deaf West Theatre was founded in 1991. It is located, and was founded, in Los Angeles, California. The Deaf West Theatre exposes audiences to Deaf culture and sign language through artistic means. The goal is to connect the deaf and hearing worlds through a passion for theatre arts. Since Deaf West Theatre is located in Los Angeles, it specifically provides the opportunity for deaf and hard of hearing individuals in the area with access to experience and participate in professional theatre, which otherwise would not be possible.

=== New York Deaf Theatre ===
New York Deaf Theatre was founded in 1979. Deaf actors in the New York City area wanted an opportunity to perform in American Sign Language, which was not possible anywhere in New York City at the time. The group came together to form the New York Deaf Theatre, which today is the longest running deaf theatre company in New York City.

== Common themes ==
Themes that are common to ASL literature genres typically reflect the shared life experiences of the American Deaf community. Todd Czubek and Janey Greenwald suggest that using what they call a "Deaf lens" to analyze literature allow a reader of an ASL text to recognize these themes and understand the experiences of the Deaf community. Deaf individuals are commonly born to hearing parents, and therefore are not exposed to the Deaf community and culture in their home environments. This results in many Deaf individuals being unaware that they are a member of a minority culture unless and until they begin attending a residential Deaf institute, where they begin to develop a sense of self and learn the customs and values of the Deaf community. Teachers and older students tell stories to the younger or newer students as a means of helping them develop their Deaf identities. This experience is echoed through one common theme in ASL Literature, that of "coming home". It is in these spaces that Deaf individuals find others like themselves and develop a family away from home, where they feel a sense of belonging. As such, some works of ASL Literature emphasize the importance of developing this home away from home.

One example that represents the theme of coming home is Clayton Valli's poem "Cocoon Child", in which a child begins by wandering aimlessly, then closes her eyes and closes off her body by curling up and clenching her fists to represent how the Deaf community are cut off from the world, and then is approached by others who help the child leave her 'cocoon' and transform by unfolding into the world representing that she has now gained a sense of self. Another example is Debbie Rennie's poem "Black Hole: Colors ASL". It depicts a person climbing a ladder, with uncertainty about what will be left behind. As the person continues to climb, she finds cans of paint, which she dips her hands into representing her discovery and use of ASL. Another person shakes the base of the ladder, causing her to spill the paint and create a sinkhole that the ladder starts to fall into. This becomes a moment of awareness for the person, that the mainstream culture is no longer where she wants to be, and she flails her arms to stay immersed in her new language and culture.

Another iteration of this theme is in the poem "To A Hearing Mother", by Ella Mae Lentz. This work takes on the daunting task of conveying to the mother of a deaf child why his other, equally important, family and home will be in the Deaf community.

Another common theme in Deaf literature and culture is the idea of the community "coming into the light", which is related to the closeness Deaf community members feel when they are together due to a shared means of communication. A production by the National Theatre of the Deaf, My Third Eye, plays with the theme of light. In one scene, after a helicopter rescues a person from a violent storm at sea, the sun rises over the water, which is depicted by Deaf performers use their hands to depict shining rays of sun. The gathering of the Deaf community creates hope, and therefore light. Another common theme of ASL Literature touched on in My Third Eye is the "two-world condition", which deals with the position of the Deaf minority culture existing within the hearing majority culture of society. One of the characters recounts his experience of arriving at a residential Deaf institute, which was an unfamiliar environment, and being left there by his mother for the first time. Over time, he begins to realize that the people of the majority culture have a different view of reality and a different way of living than the minority culture within the institute.

Another traditional story commonly told in the Deaf community, Eyeth, reverses this two-world condition so that Deaf culture is the majority and hearing culture is the minority. In the version retold by Sam Supalla, a young Deaf boy does not want to return home to his hearing family for the weekend. A teacher tells him about a planet known as Eyeth, where everyone communicates through sign language. When the child becomes an adult, he moves to Eyeth and becomes a Deaf teacher to hearing children. One day, a student is upset because she does not want to return home to her Deaf family for the weekend, so he comforts her by telling her of the planet Earth, where the majority of people can hear and communicate by speaking. The story plays both on the importance of identifying with a common culture, and by playing on the puns "ear-th" and "eye-th" for the majority hearing and majority signing planets respectively. This traditional tale is also told in a play written by Aaron Kelestone at NTID, called TALES from the Deaf Side.

One traditional story that emphasizes the importance of shared Deaf identity tells of two Civil War soldiers, one from the North and one from the South, both of whom were Deaf. Upon encountering each other, they pointed their guns at each other, but upon realizing they were both Deaf, put their guns down and began chatting. This story is a powerful demonstration that the men's shared Deaf identity superseded all other connections or alliances they had formed to the outside world. Not only do the two Deaf characters see a reflection of themselves in the other Deaf character, but they are also supporting each other in a way common to minority cultures.

Ben Bahan's story, "Bird of a Different Feather", creates an allegory about the oppression that some Deaf children face when born into hearing families, and also uses the imagery of the absence of light. In the story, a straight-beaked bird is born into an eagle family. Throughout the story the eagle family attempts to mold the straight-beaked bird to fit in, thus setting up an allegory relating the experiences of Deaf children born to hearing families who try to mold them to fit hearing culture. The eagle parents enroll the straight-beaked bird in a school where it is supposed to learn how to act like an eagle, such as develop hunting skills, despite the differences in his physical characteristics. They even encourage it to undergo surgery to change its beak into a curved shape more like an eagle's beak. The result is that the straight-beaked bird feels that he does not fit into a single bird species, and flies off into the sunset alone. In addition to playing with a "lack of light" imagery, Bahan is utilizing an animal fable in which animals are anthropomorphized to drive home a point, which is common to minority literatures. The allegory relates to the experience of many Deaf individuals whose parents believe their Deafness needs to be cured, despite the fact that many members of the Deaf community do not agree.

Sam Supalla's For a Decent Living emphasizes the importance of community by tracing the difficulties that one Deaf man faces as he tries to earn a living for himself. His triumph at the end of the story represents the triumph of the Deaf community. Early in the story, the man leaves his home and meets an older Deaf person, who tells him about a local Deaf club and invites him into the community. Once the community accepts him as a member of the group, they tell him about a local factory where he can find work. Against the odds, the man is employed and impresses the manager, leading to other Deaf community members being hired by the factory.

== See also ==
- American Sign Language
- Deaf culture
