= Ben Bahan =

American writer

- Born: New Jersey
- Education: Gallaudet University (B.A.) Boston University (PhD.)
- Occupations: ASL & Deaf Studies Professor at Gallaudet University
- Known for: ASL advocacy & Storyteller

Benjamin James Bahan is a professor of ASL and Deaf Studies at Gallaudet University and a member of the deaf community. He is an influential figure in American Sign Language literature as a storyteller and writer of deaf culture. He is known for the stories "The Ball Story" and "Birds of a Different Feather". He is known for writing the book A Journey into the Deaf-World (1996) with Robert J. Hoffmeister and Harlan Lane. Bahan also co-wrote and co-directed the film Audism Unveiled (2008) with his colleague Dirksen Bauman.

== Biography ==
Bahan was born to deaf parents in New Jersey and attended Marie Katzenbach School for the Deaf located in West Trenton, New Jersey. Later he attended Gallaudet University where he received his bachelor's degree in biology in 1978. Afterwards, he attended The Salk Institute in La Jolla, California where he researched American Sign Language linguistics and acquisition. Then in 1981, he moved to the San Francisco Bay area to collaborate with Joe Dannis on starting a new business called DawnSignPress, for which Bahan was vice president. Later he moved to Boston where he attended Boston University. There he received his master's degree in Deaf Education, as well as a doctorate degree in Applied Linguistics. During his studies at Boston University, Bahan helped operate the Deaf Studies Program in the School of Education. In 1996, he returned to Gallaudet as a professor and chair of the Department of ASL and Deaf Studies.

He is currently an Executive Editor with Bauman and Melissa Malzkuhn of the Deaf Studies Digital Journal, the world's first online, peer-reviewed academic and cultural arts journal to feature scholarship and creative work in both signed and written languages.

Bahan and his wife now live in Frederick, Maryland, with their children David and Juliana.

== Works ==
"Bird of a Different Feather" is an allegorical tale of a bird born into a family of eagles. The family's response to this different member of the family represents the experiences of many deaf children born into hearing families. Topics of religion, identity, and cochlear implants are mentioned.

A Journey into the Deaf-World offers insights into the deaf world, the community that it is made up of, and the benefits brought to the community by the language it uses. The book also focuses to the topics of education of deaf children, how deaf people assimilated into wider society, the natural development of ASL, the pros and cons of technology for deaf individuals, what can be learned from deaf societies in other countries, and what the deaf world holds in the future.

Audism Unveiled is a documentary film about deaf oppression and how it has influenced people to develop a sense of deaf community and identity. It includes many personal anecdotes from a diverse group of deaf individuals.

Bahan stars in Emilio Insolera's film Sign Gene: The First Deaf Superheroes, the first superhero film about deaf mutants who have superhuman powers through the use of sign language. Bahan plays Hugh Denison, the boss of the Quinpar Intelligence Agency. The film was released in 2017.
