= Clayton Valli =

American linguist (1951–2003)

- Born: May 25, 1951; Newburyport, Massachusetts, US
- Died: March 7, 2003 (aged 51); Miami, Florida, US

Academic background
- Education: Austine School for the Deaf; Rochester Institute of Technology; University of Nevada, Reno; Gallaudet University; Union Institute

Clayton Valli (May 25, 1951 – March 7, 2003) was an American prominent deaf linguist and American Sign Language (ASL) poet whose work helped further to legitimize ASL and introduce people to the richness of American Sign Language literature.

== Personal life ==
Born in Newburyport, Massachusetts, Valli attended the Austine School for the Deaf in Vermont. He earned an A.A.S. in photography from the National Technical Institute for the Deaf at the Rochester Institute of Technology and a B.A. from the University of Nevada, Reno in social psychology. In 1985, Valli received his M.A. in linguistics from Gallaudet University. He earned his Ph.D. in linguistics and ASL poetics from the Union Institute in Cincinnati, Ohio, in 1993, making him the first to achieve a doctorate in ASL poetry. He was also the first to identify the features of ASL poetry as a literary genre in its own right. Valli was openly gay.

== Career ==
As a poet, Valli created original works in ASL that he performed to appreciative audiences around the U.S. His poems make sophisticated use of handshape, movement, use of space, repetition, and facial expression. Influenced by canonical American poets like Robert Frost and deaf poets like Bernard Bragg, Valli often chose nature imagery to convey subtle insights into the deaf experience. His brief "Hands" — which uses the 5 handshape throughout — celebrates the power of sign language to describe anything in the universe. "Dandelion" uses simple nature imagery to convey the persistence of ASL despite oralists' best efforts to weed it out.

He gave workshops and presentations across the U.S. that raised awareness and appreciation for the movement, meter, and rhythm in ASL poetry. His poetic works, which have drawn international recognition for their aestheticism and contribution to literary scholarship, are available on video, performed by him and other ASL artists.

Valli taught in the Linguistics Department at Gallaudet University. He researched the sociolinguistics of ASL and co-authored influential books such as Introduction to the Linguistics of American Sign Language and The Gallaudet Dictionary of American Sign Language, as well as numerous articles.

He also made an impact in Canada while working at the Ernest C. Drury School for the Deaf in Milton, Ontario. He provided teacher training workshops in ASL poetry for the Ontario ASL Curriculum Team. He helped to pioneer the worldwide movement to develop an ASL-as-a-first-language curriculum for deaf children.

Valli died from complications of AIDS in Miami. Two scholarship funds are named in his memory at Gallaudet University.

== See also ==
- Bimodal bilingualism
- American Sign Language literature
