= Harlan Lane =

American psychologist (1936–2019)

- Born: Harlan Lawson Lane; August 19, 1936; New York City, U.S.
- Died: July 13, 2019 (aged 82); Roquefort-les-Pins, Alpes-Maritimes, France
- Occupation: Psychologist

Harlan Lawson Lane (August 19, 1936 – July 13, 2019) was an American psychologist. Lane was the Matthews Distinguished University Professor of Psychology at Northeastern University in Boston, Massachusetts, in the United States, and founder of the Center for Research in Hearing, Speech, and Language. His research was focused on speech, Deaf culture, and sign language.

Lane was born in Brooklyn, New York. Remaining in New York City for college, he obtained both a B.S. and an M.S. in psychology from Columbia University in 1958. He subsequently received a PhD in psychology from Harvard (1960) and a Doc. des Lettres from the Sorbonne (1973). In 1991, Lane received a MacArthur Foundation Fellowship.

Lane, a hearing man, became an often controversial spokesman for the Deaf community and critic of cochlear implants. He wrote extensively on the social construction of disability and stated that "Unless Deaf people challenge the culturally determined meanings of deaf and disability with at least as much vigor as the technologies of normalization seek to institutionalize those meanings, the day will continue to recede in which Deaf children and adults live the fullest lives and make the fullest contribution to our diverse society." In recognition of his research and advocacy regarding these issues, Lane received the Distinguished Service Award from the National Association of the Deaf (United States), the International Social Merit Award from the World Federation of the Deaf, and numerous other awards.

He was Commandeur de l'Ordre des Palmes Académiques, the highest level of the academic honor given out by the French government.

Lane died in France from Parkinson's disease on July 13, 2019, at the age of 82.

== Publications ==
- Lane, Harlan. 1976. The Wild Boy of Aveyron. Harvard University Press. ISBN 0674953002. (Thomas J. Wilson Memorial Prize 1975)
- Lane, Harlan, and Richard C. Pillard. 1978. The Wild Boy of Burundi: A Study of an Outcast Child. New York: Random House. ISBN 0394412524.
- Lane, Harlan (ed.). 1984. The Deaf Experience: Classics in Language and Education. Harvard University Press. ISBN 0674194608.
- Lane, Harlan. 1984. When the Mind Hears. Random House. ISBN 0679720235. (Download brief excerpt of Chapter 1, "My New Family ".)
- Lane, Harlan and François Grosjean (eds.). 1989. Recent Perspectives on American Sign Language. Psychology Press. ISBN 0805805605.
- Lane, Harlan, Ben Bahan, and Robert J. Hoffmeister. 1996. A Journey into the Deaf World. San Diego, C.A.: DawnSignPress. ISBN 0915035634.
- Lane, Harlan. 1999. The Mask Of Benevolence: Disabling the Deaf Community. San Diego, C.A.: DawnSignPress. ISBN 1581210094.
- Emmorey, Karen, and Harlan Lane. 2000. The Signs of Language Revisited: An Anthology in Honor of Ursula Bellugi and Edward Klima. Psychology Press. ISBN 0805832467.
- Lane, Harlan. 2004. A Deaf Artist in Early America: The Worlds of John Brewster Jr. Beacon Press. ISBN 0807066168.
- Lane, Harlan, Richard C. Pillard, and Ulf Hedberg. 2011. The People of the Eye: Deaf Ethnicity and Ancestry. New York: Oxford University Press US. ISBN 0199759294.
