= Robert J. Hoffmeister =

American academic

Robert J. Hoffmeister is associate professor emeritus and former director of the Center for the Study of Communication & Deafness at Boston University. He is most known for his book, Journey into the Deaf World. He is also known for supporting the American deaf community and deaf education.

== Biography ==
Hoffmeister grew up at the residential American School for the Deaf in West Hartford, Connecticut. His parents were both teachers at the school and were both deaf. Hoffmeister attended the University of Connecticut, graduating in 1970 with a Bachelor of Science degree in Psychology and Language. He received his master's degree in Deaf Education from the University of Arizona in the following year and his doctorate in psychology, and Language and the Deaf in 1978 from the University of Minnesota.

In 1980 at Boston University he created the first university major and specialization in Deaf Studies. He was a director of Programs in Deaf Studies until 2008. From 1979 to 2008, he was also director for the Graduate Program for Education of the Deaf and ASL/ Deaf Studies.

He is an associate professor emeritus and the former director of the Center for the Study of Communication and Deafness at Boston University. According to Boston University he has done studies in the following areas:"the acquisition of American Sign Language (ASL) by Deaf children; Deaf people as a bilingual/bicultural minority group; problems in the education of the Deaf; the effects of implementing public laws on Deaf children; and the improvement of interactions between Hearing parents and their Deaf children" His most well known written work is the book Journey Into the Deaf-World, which he coauthored with Harlan Lane and Ben Bahan.

He is currently director emeritus of the Center for Research and Training, a department of The Learning Center for Deaf in Framingham, Massachusetts.

== Publications ==
His most well known book, A Journey into the Deaf World, is written by two scholars, one of whom is deaf and one hearing, and Hoffmeister himself, who is a child of a deaf adult. Applying modern social theories, Hoffmeister and his coauthors offer insights into the deaf world, the community that it is made up of, and the benefits brought to the community by the language it uses (American Sign Language). The book also refers to the topics of education of deaf children, how deaf people assimilated into wider society, the natural development of ASL, the pros and cons of technology for deaf individuals, what can be learned from deaf societies in other countries, and what the deaf world holds in the future. This book is very popular for those who want to learn about the deaf world.

Another notable written work that Hoffmeister is known for is the chapter that he contributed in the book called Manual Communication Implications for Education, where he explains the ups and downs of the use of ASL in the education of deaf children, as well as the structure of ASL: its phonological and morphological components, classifiers and sentence level structure. Lastly, the chapter explains bilingual and bicultural programs in deaf education.

In the book Cross-Cultural Misinformation: What Does Special Education Say About Deaf People Hoffmeister shows how society views deafness. This book explains the information presented in special education text books to determine how issues surrounding deaf persons are presented. He evaluates thirteen special education text books to analyze whether it presents a pathological view or cultural view on deaf children. The majority of the text books focused on the idea that deaf people need to be cured, rather than focusing on the fact that deaf people have their own language and culture. From Hoffmeister's viewpoint, there is no input in these textbooks from the deaf community, and in some cases there is active avoidance to include the viewpoints of deaf people.

Hoffmeister co-wrote the article Language and Theory of Mind: A Study of Deaf Children with Brenda Schick, Peter De Villers and Jill De Villers. The article summarized their study on Theory of mind (ToM) abilities in deaf children. 176 deaf children of varying ages participated in the study, with some as old as eight years of age and some as young as three. The children either used American Sign Language (ASL) or oral English, and some had hearing parents, while others had deaf parents. The study concluded that "there was a significant delay on ToM tasks in deaf children of hearing parents, who typically demonstrate language delays, regardless of whether they used spoken English or ASL. In contrast, deaf children from deaf families performed identically to same-aged hearing controls (N=42)." Moreover, both understanding of syntactic and vocabulary were predictors of verbal and low-verbal ToM tasks success.

In the book Language Acquisition by Eye Hoffmeister explains how deaf children learn literacy skills, including reading skills as well as literacy skills in American Sign Language (ASL), which have only recently been identified. According to Hoffmeister, language and literacy skills in ASL in deaf education have not been recognized as having the potential impact of helping deaf children acquire English literacy skills, despite the fact that ASL is the most widely used language among deaf people in the US and Canada. Furthermore, the support of using ASL in the class room has not been agreed on because there is no shared written form of the language.

In Why Schools for Deaf Children Should Hire Deaf Teachers: A Preschool Issue Hoffmeister, along with his coauthor Courtney Shantie, determines that bilingual education for deaf children is the best way for them to learn. He argues that the best role models for deaf children are those who use American Sign Language (ASL) in early education, which means that deaf students' preschool teachers should be native signers. Additionally, he discusses the problems that exist using manual codes of English for the education of deaf children.

In the book Open Your Eyes: Deaf Studies Talking, Hoffmeister explains the lives of hearing children of deaf parents (HCDP). He relates HCDP's lives to living on the "border", and also examines the lives of minority groups in the US and their managing of two cultures. Hoffmeister explains that the concept of border refers to a Venn diagram, where the deaf and HCDP are not exclusive to each other, but have both overlapping and separate components.

== Research ==
Hoffmeister studies how deaf children think using ASL, as well as how hearing people acquire ASL as a second language, and the most difficult environments for learning ASL. He also developed the American Sign Language Assessment Instrument (ASLAI), which began in 1988. This is used to measure the different levels of signing skills in children who are deaf. Lastly, he studies how deaf children use ASL to learn English.

== Honors ==
Hoffmeister has received several awards. In 2010, he received "The Frederick C. Schreiber Award" from the National Association for the Deaf, presented in memory of Frederick C. Schreiber, their first executive director, for the advancement of civil rights, human rights, and linguistic rights of Americans who are deaf and hard of hearing. He also received "The Distinguished Service Award" and "The Thomas Hopkins Gallaudet Award" in recognition of his commitment to the deaf community.
