= Austine School =

Former school for the deaf in Vermont, United States

Coordinates: 42.8422°N 72.5746°W

Austine School for the Deaf and Hard of Hearing
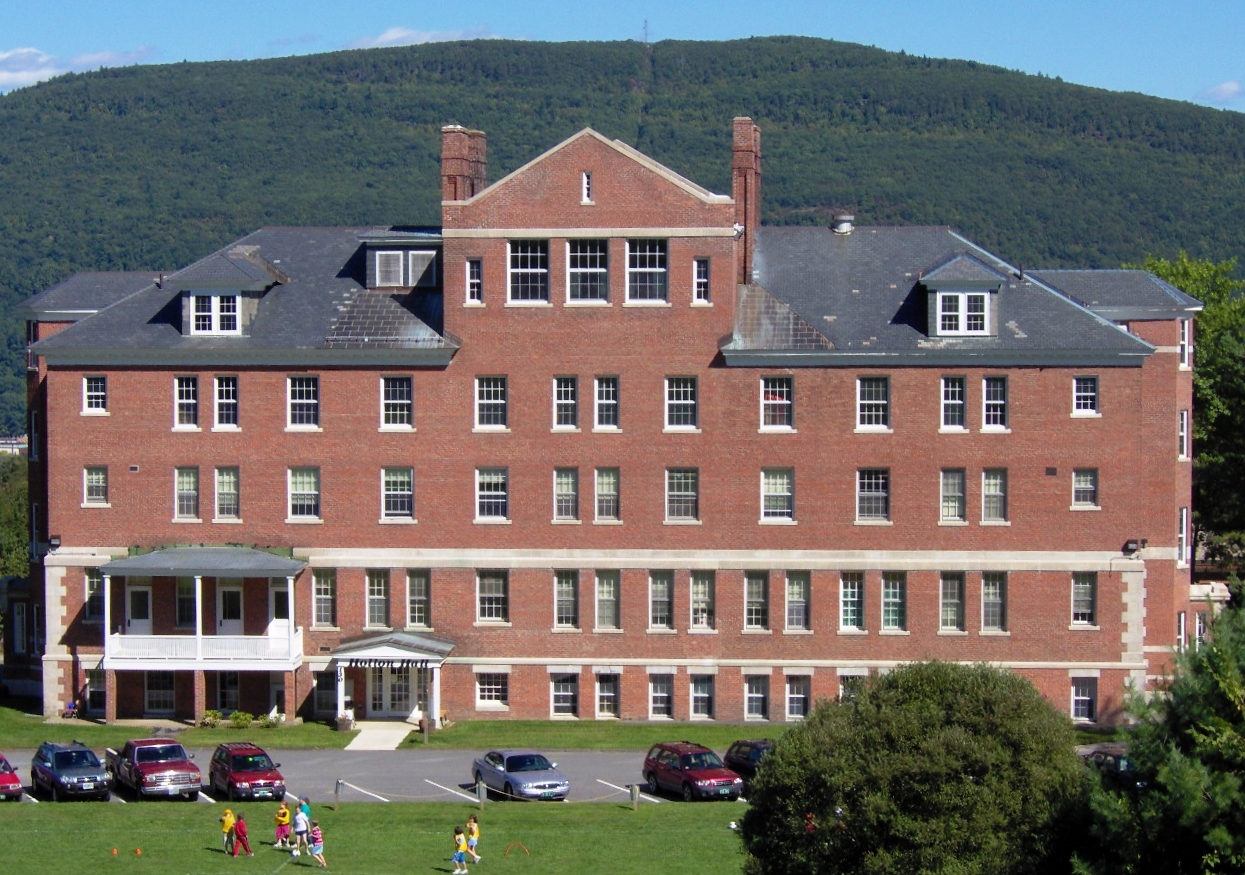
- Holton Hall of the Austine School
- Brattleboro, Vermont

Information
- Type: Private
- Established: 1904
- Closed: 2014
- Grades: Pre-K–12
- Colors: Green and White
- Mascot: Arrows

The Austine School for the Deaf, now closed, in Brattleboro, Vermont, was an independent, coeducational day and residential school for deaf and hard-of-hearing children age four to eighteen from New England and New York.

== History ==
In the late 1800s, U.S. Army Colonel William Austine retired to Brattleboro, Vermont. In his will, the Colonel specified a sum of $50,000 to establish a hospital for the treatment of strangers or local residents with extraordinary circumstances. Complying with this wish and under trusteeship, five prominent local citizens incorporated the Austine Institution in 1904. After debate, the Vermont Attorney General, who was also the administrator of the Colonel's will, prevailed with his suggestion to open a school for deaf and blind students. Support was gained from the Vermont General Assembly to purchase a 200-acre (0.81 km2) farm. In the fall of 1912 the Austine School opened with 16 students.

In 1914, Alexander Graham Bell delivered Austine School's first commencement address. During the late 1950s and early 60s, the school experienced expansive growth. A new elementary school was added followed by a new high school wing. Soon after, the high school boys' and girls' dormitories were completed. In 1970, the construction of Vermont Hall upgraded the dormitories for the younger children and added administrative offices, a modern kitchen, dining room and health facility.

On April 11, 2014, The Vermont Center for the Deaf and Hard of Hearing (VCDHH) Board of Directors voted to close both the Williams Center and the Austine School for the Deaf. The organization had continued financial issues due to declining enrollment over the years. In January 2016, Winston Prouty Center was approved by the US Bankruptcy Court to purchase the former Austine School campus.

=== Vermont Center ===
In 1975 the Education for All Handicapped Children Act was passed. This legislation greatly impacted how persons with special needs are educated. As public schools began struggling to accommodate deaf and hard-of-hearing students in mainstream classrooms, Austine School leadership increasingly realized that their education expertise and guidance could be invaluable in helping school systems and families achieve their education goals. Thus the Vermont Center was created to provide statewide, location-based support for deaf education through a consulting network. Programs the Austine School had founded over the years to meet the needs of the deaf community beyond the classroom were grouped under the Vermont Center.

=== Williams Center ===
With mainstreaming underway, the Austine School recognized a marked increase in the percentage of its students who face multiple physical and education challenges. In response, The William Center was created as a separate school licensed by the Department for Children and Families and housed on the Austine Campus as a residential facility for emotionally disturbed deaf children.

== Academics and education philosophy ==
The Austine School was led by principal Anne Potter and offered residential and day student programs. The elementary school program used a combination of the Montessori Method, the State of Vermont Framework of Standards and Learning Opportunities (VFSLO) and the VCDHH curriculum to develop within students a solid foundation of knowledge, communication proficiency, critical thinking and conflict resolution skills, as well as a level of maturity to transition into middle school and beyond. The middle and high school continued to focus on the whole student and adhere to curricula based on the VFSLO. Core classes were English, Reading, Math, Science, Social Studies, Art, Health, Keyboarding and Physical Education. Electives were provided.

Austine provided specialized classes for students with multiple disabilities or special learning needs. Each student was encouraged to explore and discover the art of both independent and collaborative learning. Additional opportunities were made available through a career exploration class, a business education class, work-based learning, vocational assessment and transition planning. High school students participated in Austine's innovative supported onsite learning program at Brattleboro Union High School and could apply to the Southeast Vermont Career Education Center in Brattleboro for courses that developed specific employment skills in 16 fields.

Striving to prepare students for entry to college and career by making learning relevant to everyday life, the school provided a academic program tailored to meet the individual needs of each student. The goal for every Austine student was to experience a happy, healthy and successful adulthood.

Austine's idyllic campus provided opportunities for a rich student life, ranging from onsite ropes courses, hiking and swimming, and varsity sports (the Austine Arrows), to participation in Deaf Academic Bowl at Gallaudet University.

Austine has an active alumni community, many of whom chose to stay in Brattleboro after graduation.

== Language Policy ==
From its establishment, the Austine school was intended to be run by the oral method of teaching: "It is to be a pure oral school, and the trustees hope to make it a first-class school in every respect". This implies that only spoken and written English were used in the classroom by instructors and students. It appears this was the policy until the mid-1960s, when the high school was established. According to the Austine News (1965), sign language was allowed in the high school:

Simultaneous communication was determined as the basic communication method in the high school area. This method employs the media of speech, speechreading (lipreading), amplification through group or individual hearing aids, writing, dramatics, pantomime, finger-spelling and the language of signs. This means that students with little residual hearing can see the manual symbols on the hands; those who are proficient lipreaders can follow oral conversation clues; those who have a usable residue of hearing can follow auditory clues. All conversation is given at a normal rate of speed. The simultaneous method reduces the need for numerous repetitions and augments our traditionally strong program in speech, lipreading, and auditory training.

At this time sign language was actively discouraged in the elementary school and preschool programs. However, the high school program was such a success, sign language instruction quickly spread throughout all the programs and by 1971 the entire school was encouraging the use of sign language. In 1990, Austine officially adopted the Bilingual-Bicultural Approach.

== Notable alumni ==
- Dr. Clayton Valli (1971): linguistics professor at Gallaudet University and sign language poet
