= Body part as object =

Technique in pantomiming

Body part as object (BPO) mime gestures occurs when an individual substitutes a part of their body - usually arms, fingers, or hands - to be part of an object they are miming. Miming uses representational gestures, meaning they are used to convey a message to others without the use of speech. A commonly used example of BPO miming is demonstrated by an individual using their finger to represent a toothbrush while acting out brushing their teeth.

In studying gestures from a psychological, psycholinguistic, and/or neuropsychological context, pantomimes can be distinguished by how they are carried out. For example, BPO mime gestures are differentiated by the insertion of a body part to help represent the object itself. Conversely, Imaginary object (IO) pantomimes occur when an individual mimes the use of an object as though the object were actually present. Using a similar example to above, an IO pantomime occurs as an individual pretends to brush their teeth by positioning the hand and fingers as though the toothbrush were actually in their hand: they are pretending the object is actually present.

BPO, and BPO measures particularly, are notable in that they have proven useful in studying cognition (e.g. language development, developmental psychology), and in identifying - and to a limited degree, in treating - cognitive impairment (e.g. aphasia, apraxia, schizophrenia etc.).

== BPO concept ==
=== Pantomimes: BPO and IO ===
BPO pantomimes are generally seen more in young children (3–5 years old) and those with brain damage. There are many theories as to why BPO may be prevalent in these populations. This includes disruptions in the conceptual or temporal-spatial stages in the process of learned gestures, an impairment of conveying hand-posture of tool use, and a poor representation of an external objects. IO pantomimes are seen as much more complex than BPO pantomimes because they must have a strong mental representation of the object to be used and understood. An individual cannot garner any supportive information from the environment, and must know and understand the properties of the object to manipulate it as though it is in use, even though it is not physically present.

=== Examples of models explaining gestures ===
There have been many models attempting to explain how gestures are related to semantic concepts, such as imagery and speech. The Sketch Model relates semantic concepts and gestures to one another. It posits that gestures and speech have the common purpose of communication, and thus are represented at the same conceptual level. The function of gestures are then to enhance access to mental imagery. Motor movement, while gesturing, has also been related to phonological encoding; therefore, gestural movements may prompt access to word forms and help the speaker convey their intent to others. Significantly, this model can only be generalized when gestures and their consequent speech have a meaningful relationship with each other. Overall, this theory suggests that difficult speech, such as describing motor and spatial information, will increase the amount of representational gestures produced by a speaker. Studies have supported this model through unplanned speech producing more gestures, the description of difficult figures producing more gestures than simpler figures, and a greater amount of gestures produced when participants have the freedom to say whatever they would like instead of following a script.

Additionally, there are many studies that have shown increased gesture production is dependent on the availability and strength of an imagery representation. Most recently, the Gesture as Simulated Action (GSA) theory has become prominent; it focuses on the role of mental imagery in increasing an individual's rate of gestures. GSA posits that imagining an object or event stimulates the same brain areas - the motor and visual cortices - involved in using or viewing objects and events, and thus facilitates the production of a representational gesture. Therefore, when objects are thought of using mental or visual imagery, more gestures should be produced. On the other hand, if an object is thought of only through its verbal representation, there should be fewer gestures present.

=== Tool-use and gestures ===
Tool-use is the manipulation, or use, of an object using the hands. It is one of the many skills that separate humans from animals. There are two factors used to explain tool-use in humans. First of all, part of tool-use knowledge is physical, meaning that it involves the actual manipulation of an object. The other type of knowledge is conceptual: using the physical (or active) knowledge of tool-use to add to the mental representation of the tool. Action schemas explain how we develop motor skills and performance of many complex motor-activities. Essentially, the more an object is manipulated and used, a greater schema is developed in the brain. Therefore, increased object use gives us a greater understanding of the object, which then facilitates our understanding of the object independent of its context. The strength of an action schema is significant in studying apraxia and BPO pantomimes, because there appears to be a disruption in the context of an object: an individual may understand the function of an object, but experiences difficulty using the object out of its context, or when it is not physically present.

There have been many studies relating activated brain areas to tool-use, in both physical object manipulation and pantomimes. Meta-analyses have found that tool-use is largely lateralized in the left-hemisphere of the brain and independent of handedness. Specifically, the brain region which showed the greatest activity was the left superior parietal lobule. Other areas that showed significant activity was bilaterally in both the ventral and dorsolateral premotor cortex, areas by the inferior parietal lobule, and tissue around the medial temporal gyrus. Furthermore, even when object-use was imagined, activation was found to be largely lateralized in the left hemisphere and was very similar to the brain activation in actual tool-use and pantomiming. The only significant difference was additional activation in the left occipito-parietal region.

Viewing tools potentiates motor activity related to the specific tool-use. This phenomenon is different from other classes of objects, and indicates that tools are not viewed just based on what they are, but also what they actually do. In just viewing tools, activation of left lateralized areas are very similar to the use/pantomiming areas as noted above. These areas include the ventral premotor cortex, left inferior frontal gyrus and some parietal areas. The main difference is that tools being used elicit greater activation in ventral brain regions, and decreased activation in primary motor areas. Additionally, there were very similar areas of activation in naming tools and viewing tools. There were other areas of activation in the left hemisphere, possibly reflecting the lateralization of language.

Differential brain activation has been compared between the us of either IO or BPO pantomimes. The IO pantomime activity was largely lateralized in the left hemisphere, namely in the bilateral supplementary motor areas, cingulate gyrus, left premotor areas, left superior parietal lobule, and the left middle and inferior frontal gyri. The BPO pantomimes activated areas bilaterally in the supplementary motor areas, cingulate gyrus, premotor areas, SMG and the left inferior and middle frontal gyri, and the left medial temporal gyri. The main difference observed was that IO pantomime activation was left-hemisphere lateralized and BPO pantomime activation was bilateral. These results imply that BPO pantomimes actually show greater activation than IOS

Starting my house pantomimes (despite the prevailing conception that they are simpler), and that BPO involves the right hemisphere as well as the left hemisphere. These results could be extended as an explanation of why apraxic brain damage - usually found in left-hemisphere - leads to BPO production. This may be an indication that apraxic's utilize their right-hemisphere in lieu of their left-hemisphere damage, and therefore produce more BPO pantomimes.

== BPO history ==
Concepts leading to the exploration and discovery of body part as object pantomimes first began in the late 19th century. Problems in the ability to comprehend or communicate with symbols, asymbolia, was first established by Finkelnburg. This idea of representational disturbance instead of disturbance in movement is still present in the current discussion of aphasia and BPO pantomimes. In 1905, Liepmann conducted a study of brain injured patients. He wrote of ideokinetic apraxia, the dissociation between the idea of movement of a real or imagined object and its implementation. Problems with gestures and pantomimes were considered to be a category of apraxia. He concluded that the control of effortful movements was in the left hemisphere and that aphasia could indicate lesions in the brain. Various other theories regarding gestural deficits of aphasics have been put forward since then, including intellectual degradation, and the inability to carry out pretended actions. Denny-Brown takes a more holistic approach and suggested ideational apraxia results from diffuse brain damage.

Body part as object is a relatively new concept in scientific literature. Past studies have suggested that BPO pantomimes may allow aphasics to avoid an impaired cognitive function. By not having to reproduce a movement outside of the usual context, they can have a more vivid experience of acting on an object. What is known as BPO pantomiming in children was first discussed in Harold Goodglass and George Kaplan's 1963 article, and the results replicated by Overton & Jackson. Their findings suggest younger children were more likely to use BPO pantomimes to create a tangible representation of the object they were pantomiming. Boyatzis & Watson suggests that the decrease in BPO pantomime usage with age is a result of developing symbolic maturity, as older children can use a less concrete representational form.

=== Controversy in using BPO as measure ===
Body part as object errors are defined as the use of BPO pantomimes in place of the IO pantomimes dominant in typical adult individuals. It has been debated whether the existence of BPO errors can be used as a measure for aphasia or brain damage. In the studies conducted by Mercaitis and Ohnemus, normal adult subjects occasionally used BPO pantomimes, suggesting these errors are not restricted to children and those with brain damage. In addition, more BPO errors are made by older adults around 70 years of age and adults with lower education. The gesture itself also plays a role of the labelling performance, affected by the complexity and conventionality of the movement and the familiarity of the item. There exists a great deal of variability among similar aged children's aptitude in using IO pantomimes, some excelling while a proportion continue to use BPO pantomimes frequently. No age range seems to exist in which children apply and understand BPO pantomimes exclusively. These extraneous variables should therefore be considered when using BPO errors as a measure. Some studies do not account for these factors, which may explain conflicting results between them. A concern in testing for apraxia and BPO errors is the use of qualitative judgments in place of quantifiable data. Many assessments of apraxia have been published, however few are considered to be clinically appropriate. Numerous evaluations focus on a single deficit, take long periods of time, and do not include psychometric characteristics. Future studies will be needed to further investigate the relationship between BPO errors, brain damage or aphasia, and the measurement and/or diagnostic potential.

== BPO implications and applications ==
Studies of gestural ability incorporating BPO measures consider aspects of cognition, language, language impairment, and motor apraxia. Cognitive and linguistic studies tend to emphasize symbolic representation, expression, and comprehension in a human development context. Language impairment studies utilize BPO measures to explore gestural deficits that are correlated with particular language capabilities, and to help distinguish distinctive categories of - and degrees of severity in - aphasia. Studies of motor apraxia use BPO measures to better understand gestural impairment in apraxic patients, and often consider aphasia as an apraxic phenomenon.

=== Developmental psychology ===
It has been well-established that when pantomiming objects, preschool aged children use BPO pantomimes instead of IO pantomimes. Conceptually, this is similar to children using replica objects (i.e. concretely similar objects) in pretend play before they progress to using substitute objects (i.e. abstractly representative objects).

There are a number of developmental theoretical accounts for this BPO pantomime proclivity in young children.

It is thought that this BPO pantomime preference is indicative of an undeveloped metarepresentational cognitive capacity, which emerges in the second year of life and leads to dominant use of IO pantomimes over BPO pantomimes beginning in the third year of life. Metarepresentation refers to the capacity to conceive of representational relations themselves, and is facilitated through developing competency in distinguishing between what something represents and how it is represented. Development of a mental state lexicon (i.e. language used to describe internal mental states, notably emotions) and some, but not all, components of pretend play are dependent on this capacity for metarepresentational cognition.

Theory of Mind development reflects this capacity for metarepresentation. Theory of Mind refers to common sense understanding of the world, which includes the understanding that people – inclusive of oneself - possess varied and changing mental states like thoughts, beliefs and desires. These mental states are the determining aspect of behaviour. Research has shown that IO pantomime use is connected to Theory of Mind development and thus, that the lack of IO pantomimes in younger children is not the result of the child's choice or preference.

Research has also provided support for children's eventual use of IO instead of BPO pantomimes as being part of the decontextualization process. Decontextualization is the process through which the behaviours and objects used in pretence become increasingly detached from their real-life contexts and uses. Data have shown that children between 3 and 5 years old produced fewer BPO pantomimes when asked to simply hold an imagined object, rather than demonstrating imaginary use of the object; this has been offered as support to IO over BPO pantomime use as being an indicator of the development of capacity for symbolic representation and reflective coordination of symbolic representations. Incidentally, reflective coordination of symbolic representations also leads to development of Theory of Mind and symbol use. However, BPO vs. IO pantomime use in object representation can also be affected by non-developmental factors such as familiarity with the object, movement complexity, how conventionalized the movement is, and features of the object (i.e. if object changes shape during its normal use).

In old age, BPO pantomimes again become more frequent; it is thought that this is due to the metarepresentational cognitive capacity diminishing with age, specifically through difficulties in the inhibition of the automatic activation of tool emblems instead of appropriate hand postures required to hold the object. Additionally, it has been shown that education level can also be a factor in BPO pantomime use in normal adults, such that the higher the level of the adult's education, the fewer BPO pantomimes are used.

=== Aphasia ===
Primary progressive aphasia (PPA) is a syndrome characterized by a progressive language deficit without other features of dementia for at least two years. Aphasic patients exhibit impairment in gestural expression and comprehension, with the degree of impairment being commensurate with the degree of severity in aphasia. Use of BPO over IO pantomimes has been used extensively in the assessment of aphasia, but with varied interpretations.

Many researchers have advanced the idea that the regressive use of BPO pantomimes reflects the presence of a central symbolic deficit in aphasic patients. It is suggested this is due to BPO pantomimes offering a more concrete representation of an object and permits a more vivid experience of affective component of the pretended action. However, others interpret BPO pantomiming in aphasics as being indicative of apraxic motor disturbance, due to the high-comorbidity between Aphasia and Apraxia.

==== Gestural treatment for aphasia ====
The key role of gesture in human communications has important implications for people with aphasia. Language impairment can be compensated for by the communicative function and facilitative role of gesture use.

Intention Gesture Treatment (IGT) and Pantomime Gesture Treatment (PGT) have had positive treatment effects for aphasics, with PGT being shown to be more effective with individuals with severe aphasia.

Other forms of gestural training like artificial language techniques, Amerind, and American Sign Language have also been shown to reduce language impairment in aphasics; even in those with no grammatical or syntactical ability. Such training also stimulates the thought processes and improves the self-concept of these patients.

=== Apraxia ===
Apraxia is a neurological condition in which an individual loses the ability to execute movements that the individual is otherwise physically capable of performing.

Use of BPO pantomimes, instead of the IO pantomimes dominant in non-apraxic patients (i.e. BPO errors), is one of the diagnostic error patterns in apraxia. Though BPO errors seem to be inconsistent in their efficacy for diagnosing apraxia: many studies have shown BPO errors being distinctly associated with the apraxic symptomatology; while many have shown they are not. However, it has been asserted that these apparently contradicting results may be due to a lack of control for confounding factors. For example, BPO errors are differentially affected by age and educational level in normal subjects; older, healthy people (tested group average 69 years old) and healthy adults with lower amount of education (tested group with average 7.2 years of formal education) make significantly more BPO errors than the average adult population.

=== Schizophrenia ===
It has been found that BPO errors (i.e. use of BPO pantomimes in place of the IO pantomimes dominant in typical adult individuals) are made by patients with schizophrenia. Given that BPO errors are associated with apraxia, and that past research has indicated that patients with schizophrenia have apraxia-like symptoms, this is perhaps not a surprising finding. This BPO-schizophrenia association has not been extensively explored to date, and more research is required in order to better understand it.
