= Vermont Center for the Deaf and Hard of Hearing =

Vermont Center for the Deaf and Hard of Hearing, Inc.
- Brattleboro, Vermont

Information
- Type: Private
- Established: 1904
- Status: Closed
- Closed: 2014
- Grades: Pre-K–12
- Colors: Green and White
- Mascot: Arrows
- Website: VCDHH

The Vermont Center for the Deaf and Hard of Hearing, a non-profit organization, was the primary educational and support services resource for Deaf and Hard of Hearing residents in Vermont and surrounding areas. The Vermont Center, headquartered at Brattleboro's Austin's School For The Deaf, was launched by the Austine School in 1998 and operated until 2014. The Austine School was one of four independent schools and twelve outreach programs through which the Vermont Center assisted thousands of Deaf Vermonters.

== History ==
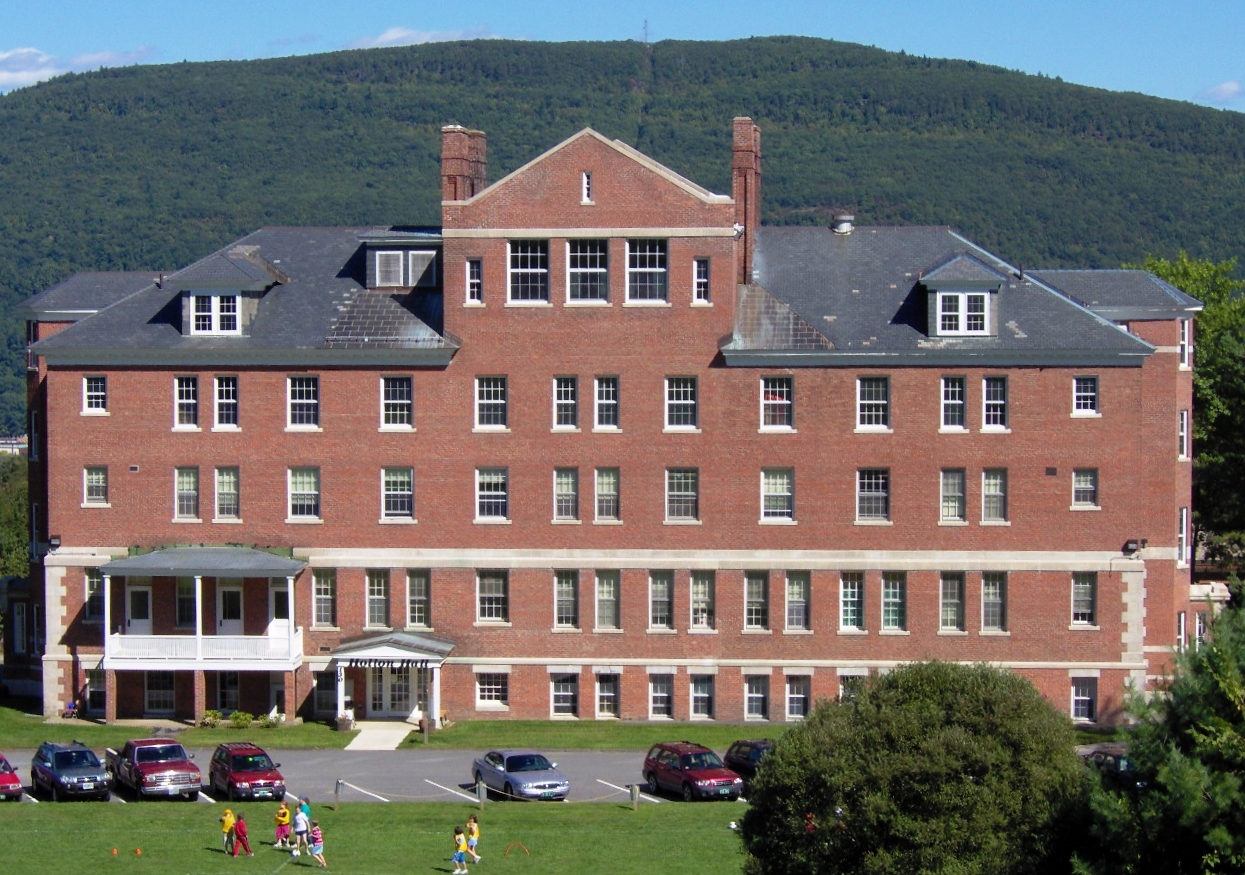

In the late 1800s, U.S. Army Colonel William Austine retired to Brattleboro, Vermont. In his will, the Colonel specified a sum of $50,000 to establish a hospital for the treatment of strangers or local residents with extraordinary circumstances. Complying with this wish and under trusteeship, five local citizens incorporated the Austine Institution in 1904. About this same time, the Brattleboro Memorial Hospital opened and alleviated the need for another medical facility. After debate, the then Vermont Attorney General, who was also the administrator of the Colonel's will, prevailed with his suggestion to open a school for blind and deaf students. Support was gained from the Vermont General Assembly to purchase a 200-acre (0.81 km^{2}) farm and in the fall of 1912 the Austine School opened with sixteen students.

In 1914, Alexander Graham Bell delivered Austine School's first commencement address.

During the late 1950s and early 1960s, the school grew. A new elementary school was added followed by a new high school wing. Soon after, a high school boys dormitory and a high school girls dorm were completed. In 1970, the construction of Vermont Hall upgraded the dormitories for the younger children, added administrative offices, a modern kitchen, dining room and health facility.

In 1975 the Education for All Handicapped Children Act was passed. This legislation impacted how people with disabilities are educated. The Vermont Center was created to provide statewide, location-based support for deaf education through a statewide consulting network. Additional programs the Austine School had founded over the years to meet the needs of the deaf community beyond the classroom were now grouped under the umbrella of the Vermont Center.

With mainstreaming underway, Austine School saw a marked increase in the percentage of its students who face multiple physical and educational challenges. In response, the William Center was created as a separate school licensed by the Department for Children and Families and housed on the Austine Campus as a residential facility for emotionally disturbed deaf children.

== Mission and philosophy ==
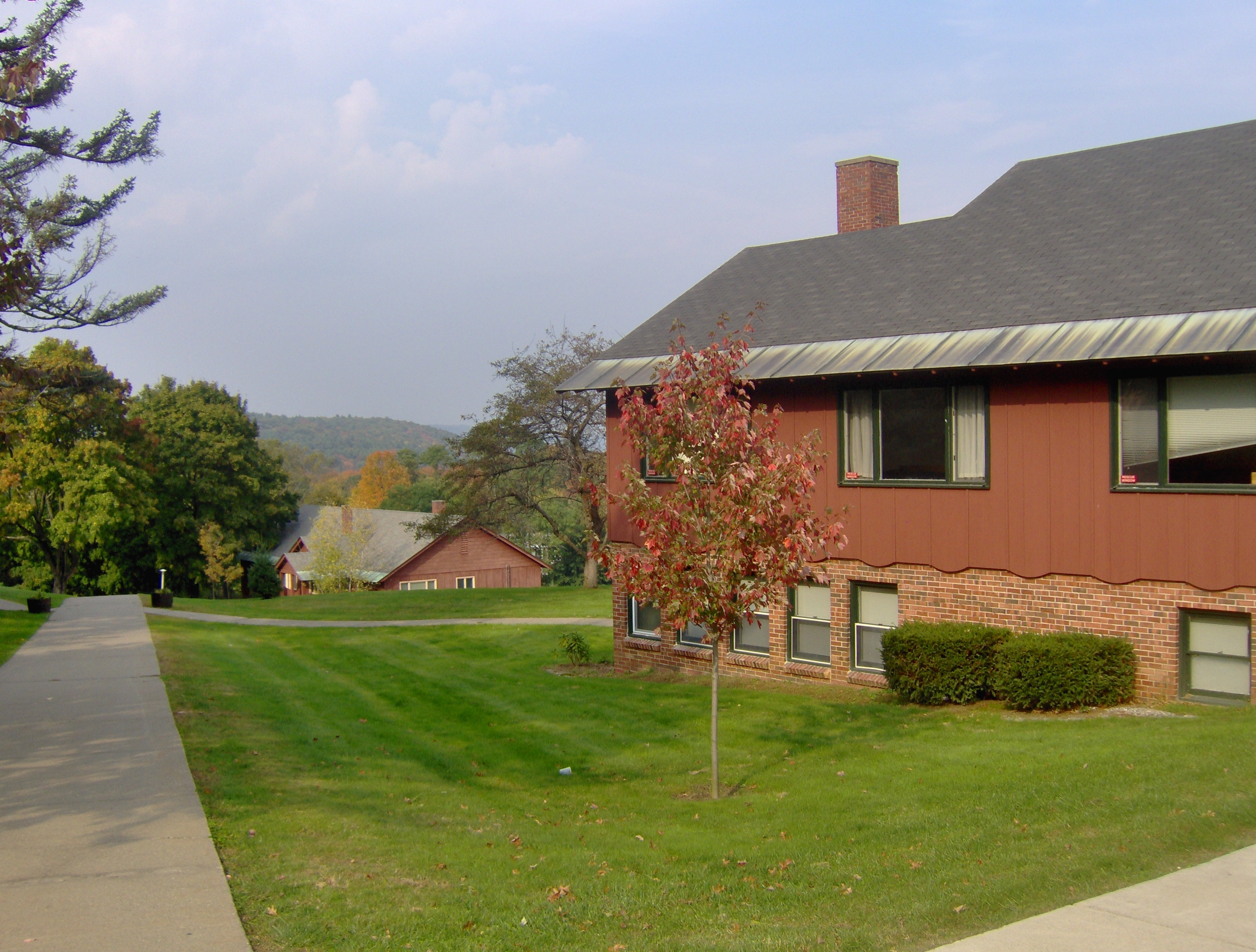

The mission of The Vermont Center for the Deaf & Hard of Hearing, Inc. was to provide comprehensive educational and support services to Deaf and Hard of Hearing children, adults, and families throughout Vermont and surrounding states. This was accomplished through:

The Austine School, in Brattleboro, was an independent, coeducational day and residential school for Deaf and Hard of Hearing children age four to twenty two from New England and New York. Striving to prepare students for entry to college and career by making learning relevant to everyday life, the school provided a challenging academic program, sensitive to the individual needs of each student. The ultimate goal for every Austine student was to experience a happy, healthy and successful adulthood.

The William Center, located on the Austine School Campus, was an approved independent school and licensed by the Department for Children and Families as a residential facility for emotionally disturbed deaf children. All students received weekly counseling from a licensed mental health counselor.

The Williston Regional Day Program in Williston, Vermont, was housed within a large public elementary school. It was a day program for Pre/K to grade eight students that utilized both mainstream and specialized curricula. Interpreters accompanied students to all mainstreamed classes.

The Bennington Regional Day Program, in Bennington, Vermont, was a specialized day program much like the Williston Program for Pre/K to grade six students.

These four educational facilities were approved by the Vermont Department of Education and Vermont Department of Children and Families for residential programs.

VCDHH Consultant Program was statewide and provided an array of special services to Deaf and Hard of Hearing students from birth to twenty-one years regardless of their educational placement. Consultants provided children and their families unbiased information regarding language choice, communication methods and educational opportunities throughout the child's developmental years. Families and school staff were provided with in-service training and ongoing support.

The Family Sign Language Mentor Program provided statewide, home-based individual sign language instruction and family support for deaf, hard of hearing and non-verbal individuals and their families.

The American Sign Language Program provided sequential, comprehensive sign language instruction to students and adults across Vermont. It also offered consultation and materials to school districts offering ASL for foreign language credit. Additionally, this program oversaw and assisted in developing statewide standards for ASL instruction. Family Services provided a full array of family-based services that include educational workshops, social opportunities, parent-to-parent networking, community outreach education, ASL instruction, Deaf mentoring, a lending library and a parent newsletter.

The Center for Audiological Services was established in 1971 at the Austine Hearing Center. The center's goal was to provide quality, affordable audiological services to the general community in southeastern Vermont and to students at the Austine School for the Deaf.

The Vermont Interpreter Referral Service (VIRS) provided statewide interpreter referral services for ASL/spoken English/oral interpreting assignments in medical, legal, mental health, employment, educational, civil and recreational settings.

The Vermont Parent Infant Program (VTPIP) was a statewide program focusing on the services and support of families of children, from birth to age three, with a diagnosed hearing loss or for whom hearing is an area of concern. This program was offered at no cost to all Vermont families.

Mental Health Services were provided statewide by masters and doctoral level clinical staff who are fluent in ASL and have expertise in working with persons who are Deaf and Hard of Hearing.

Adult Services, also known as Access, was a community-based employment program for the Deaf and Hard of Hearing. Access services included supported employment, case management, service coordination, community outreach, independent living skills instruction and vocational assessment.

Deaf Victims Advocacy Services (DVAS) was a program that serves victims of domestic and sexual violence who are Deaf or Hard of Hearing. DVAS also provides training on working with Deaf consumers to involved agencies, including police departments, court personnel and shelter staff.

Vermont Telecommunications Equipment Distribution Program (VT EDP) provided telecommunications equipment for qualified Vermont individuals with a communication impairment or disability.

Austine-Green Mountain Lion's Summer Camp served children from ages two to eighteen. It provided an opportunity for Deaf and Hard of Hearing children and their siblings to experience the pleasure of summer camp. Each day was filled with educational opportunities using adventure activities, outdoor education models and environmental studies. Educational support such as tutoring or other services specified in each child's individual education plan was also provided.

All VCDHH academic and residential programs were approved and licensed by the Vermont State Department of Education or by another department of the state government.

== Location and community ==
VCDHH was headquartered on the rural, 175-acre (0.71 km^{2}) Austine School campus overlooking the Connecticut River Valley. Holton Hall, the school's first building, housed the center's administrative office and audiological services and is the focal center of the campus. On the hillside below Holton Hall was the school proper and soccer fields. Athletic fields, hiking trails, a swimming pool, and a ropes course were on the hillside above Holton Hall. The President's house was in the forest not far off.

== Closure of VCDHH ==
In September 2014, the VCDHH trustees decided to order the closure of VCDHH due to ongoing financial issues. VCDHH filed for bankruptcy, and as part of the bankruptcy process, the former Austine School campus was sold to Winston Prouty Center, a non-profit organization, in 2016.

The State of Vermont hired a new company, Nine East Network, to provide services for deaf and hard-of-hearing residents.
