= Melissa Malzkuhn =

American deaf advocate

Melissa Malzkuhn is an American deaf advocate and founder of the Motion Light Lab at Gallaudet University. She was a 2018 Obama Fellow.

== Early life and education ==
Malzkuhn was born Deaf, and is the third generation in her family to be deaf. She grew up in a family where everyone could communicate with American Sign Language. Her grandfather Eric Malzkuhn was a renowned storyteller, and encouraged the children in the family to tell stories with signs. She is originally from Fremont, California.

Malzkuhn completed an MFA degree in visual narrative at the School of Visual Arts in New York City in 2015. She earned a master's degree in Deaf Studies from Gallaudet University in Washington, D.C., in 2008.

== Career ==
Within the Motion Light Lab, Malzkuhn uses motion-capture tools to create "signing avatars" used in interactive digital apps for deaf children. The Motion Light Lab is a hub within the Science of Learning Center on Visual Language and Visual Learning (VL2) at Gallaudet University, which is funded by the National Science Foundation.

Malzkuhn's story, The Baobab, is for young children and is a bilingual story presented in both English and American Sign Language. The Baobab is part of the VL2 Storybook App series, which is designed, managed, and co-created by Malzkuhn. A review in the Journal of Education in 2016 recognized the appeal of The Baobab to children "whether Deaf or hearing", calling it a "well-crafted tale" well suited for instruction and creative inspiration, with a bilingual glossary that is "both intriguing and informative". When schools closed during the COVID-19 pandemic, the Motion Light Lab team released one VL2 Storybook App available for free each week.

Malzkuhn helped to launch the Deaf Studies Digital Journal, and served as managing editor and co-executive editor. In 2022, Malkuhn's artwork was displayed as part of the "Exploring Deaf Geographies" exhibit at the Pyramid Atlantic Art Center in Hyattsville, Maryland.

== Publications ==
- Herzig, Melissa and Malzkuhn, Melissa (2015). "Bilingual Storybook Apps: An Interactive Reading Experience for Children". Odyssey. pp. 40–44.
- Malzkuhn, Melissa (2016). "The Role of the NAD in the American Eugenics Movement". NADmag 16(1):28–33.
