= Patrick Graybill =

Patrick Graybill (born August 29, 1939) is an American Deaf actor, storyteller, poet, educator, and Roman Catholic Deacon. He is best known for his contributions to theater and literature in American Sign Language. He was a founding member of the National Theatre of the Deaf and later a professor at the National Technical Institute for the Deaf. Graybill is recognized for his work in ASL storytelling and poetry and has been described as "the grandfather of ASL poetry".

== Early life and education ==
Graybill was born in Overland Park, Kansas, into a family in which five of seven children were deaf. He attended the Kansas School for the Deaf, graduating in 1958. He then enrolled at Gallaudet College, where he studied English and became active in theatrical activities. Graybill received a Bachelor of Arts degree in English in 1963 and a master's degree in education in 1964.

After graduating, he taught at the Kendall School for the Deaf in Washington, D.C.

== Theater career ==
In 1969 Graybill became a founding member of the National Theatre of the Deaf, one of the first professional theater companies in the United States devoted to performances in American Sign Language. He performed with the company for about a decade, appearing in numerous productions during its international tours.

During his time with the company he also directed and taught in its Professional Theatre School, a training program for Deaf actors. His stage work helped establish a style of visual performance combining ASL, gesture, and theatrical movement for both Deaf and hearing audiences.

== Academic career ==
After leaving the National Theatre of the Deaf, Graybill joined the faculty of the National Technical Institute for the Deaf, part of the Rochester Institute of Technology. He taught performing arts and ASL literature there for more than two decades before retiring in 2004.

In addition to teaching, he gave lectures and workshops on ASL storytelling, translation between English and ASL, and Deaf cultural traditions.

He was conferred the honorary degree of Doctor of Humane Letters from the St. Thomas University, Miami Gardens, Florida, in 2005.

== Religious ministry ==
Graybill was ordained as a Roman Catholic permanent deacon in 1982 and served for many years at Emmanuel Church of the Deaf in Rochester, New York.
