= List of therapeutic boarding schools =

A therapeutic boarding school is a residential school offering therapy or behavior modification for students with emotional or behavioral issues. They can include residential treatment centers and wilderness programs. Their programs are privately run, and claim to rehabilitate and teach students with autism or other learning disabilities, mental illness, or struggles with substance abuse. The industry is controversial and largely unregulated, and has faced decades of allegations of false advertising and abuse, including child abuse, sexual abuse, and wrongful deaths of resident students.

They cost of programs can exceed $10,000 a month for treatment, with residents prevented from leaving for months or years. As a result they are sometimes described as being part of the "troubled teen industry". It is particularly popular in the United States, with an estimated revenue of $20 billion a year in 2023. The National Association of Therapeutic Schools and Programs listed 140 schools and programs as of 2005, and 85 as of 2026. More than a third of those programs are in Utah.

== North America ==
=== Organizations that run or support school networks ===
- CEDU
- Aspen Education Group
- Family Help & Wellness
- New Horizons Youth Ministries
- National Association of Therapeutic Schools and Programs
- World Wide Association of Specialty Programs and Schools

=== Active schools ===
School	City	State	Type	
Academy at Swift River	Hampshire	MA		
Alpine Academy	Erda/Tooele	UT		
ANASAZI Foundation	Mesa	AZ		
ARCH Academy of Cumberland Heights	Asheville	NC		
Ascend Healthcare	Encino	CA		
At The Crossroads	Saint George	UT		
Black Mountain Academy	Black Mountain	NC		
Blue Ridge Therapeutic Wilderness	Clayton	GA	wilderness	
BlueFire Wilderness Therapy	Gooding	ID	wilderness	
BNI Treatment Centers	Agoura Hills	CA		
Brightstone Transitions	Gainesville	GA		
BrightQuest Treatment Centers	Nashville	TN		
Building Bridges	Thompson Falls	MT		
Cascade Programs	Midway	UT		
Chamberlain International School	Middleboro	MA		
Cherokee Creek Boys School	Westminster	SC		
Chrysalis Therapeutic Boarding School	Eureka	MT		
Clearview Girls Academy	Heron	MT		
Confluence Behavioral Health	Thetford Center	VT		
CooperRiis	Mill Spring	NC		
Cornerstones of Maine	Biddeford	ME		
Devereux Glenholme School	Washington	CT		
Discovery Ranch	Mapleton	UT		
Discovery Ranch South	Cedar City	UT		
Echo Springs Transitional Study Center	Sandpoint	ID		
Elevations RTC	Syracuse	UT		🌩️
Evangelhouse Christian Academy	Saint Martinville	LA		
Family First Adolescent Services	Palm Beach	FL		
Galen Hope	Coral Gables	FL		
Gateway Academy	Draper	UT		
Grove School	Madison	CT		
Havenwood Academy, Inc.	Cedar City	UT		
Heartspring School	Wichita	KS		
Heritage Schools, Inc.	Provo	UT		
Huntsman Mental Health Institute	Salt Lake City	UT		
Imperial Healing Estate	Provo	UT		
In Balance Academy	Tucson	AZ		
Intermountain	Helena	MT		
John Dewey Academy	Great Barrington	MA		🌩️, reboot
Kaizen Academy	Payson	UT		
Kiva Adventure Ranch	Toquerville	UT		
Kolob Canyon RTC	New Harmony	UT		
La Europa Academy	Murray	UT		
Legacy Treatment Center & Juniper Canyon	Loa	UT	wilderness	
Lifeskills South Florida	Deerfield Beach	FL		
LifeTutors	Asheville	NC		
Lindner Center of HOPE	Mason	OH		
Logan River Academy	Logan	UT		
Lumen Living	Gainesville	GA		
Maple Lake Academy	Payson	UT		
Meridell Achievement Center	Liberty Hill	TX		
Moonridge Academy	Cedar City	UT		
Mountain Lake Academy	Lake Placid	NY		
NBI Ranch	Weston	FL		
New Haven Residential Treatment Center	Spanish Fork	UT		
New Leaf Academy	Bend	OR		
Northwest College Support	Coeur d'Alene	ID		
OASIS Ascent	Provo	UT		
Optimum Performance Institute	Woodland Hills	CA		
Optimum Performance Institute Houston	Needville	TX		
O-School	Chicago	IL		
Oxbow Academy	Mount Pleasant	UT		
Pacific Quest	Hilo	HI		
PATH At Stone Summit	Danby	VT		
Project Patch	Garden Valley	ID		
RedCliff Ascent	Enterprise	UT	wilderness	
Red Mountain Sedona	Sedona	AZ		
Red Oak Recovery	Asheville	NC		
Resilience Recovery Resources	West Palm Beach	FL		
River View Christian Academy	Lee County	TX		🌩️
Rogers Behavioral Health	Oconomowoc	WI		
Second Nature Wilderness Family Therapy	Duchesne	UT	wilderness	
Sedona Sky Academy	Rimrock	AZ		
Sierra Sage Treatment Center	Yerington	NV		
Sorenson's Ranch School	Koosharem	UT		🌩️
Still Creek Ranch	Bryan	TX		
Stonewater Adolescent Recovery Center	Oxford	MS		
Summit Achievement	Stow	ME		
Summit School (Nyack)	Nyack	NY		
Sunrise RTC	Washington	UT		
Telos	Orem	UT		
The King's Daughters' School	Columbia	TN		
Triumph Academy	Brigham City	UT		
True North Evolution	Waitsfield	VT		
Turn-About Ranch	Escalante	UT	wilderness	🌩️
Uinta Academy RTC	Wellsville	UT		
Valley View School	North Brookfield	MA		
ViewPoint Center	Syracuse	UT		
Vive Adolescent Care	Saint George	UT		
Wediko School	Windsor	NH		
Wellspring & The Arch Bridge School	Bethlehem	CT		
WestBridge, Inc.	Manchester	NH		
Whetstone Academy	Mountain Rest	SC		
Youth Care	Draper	UT		

As of 2026.

==== Recently defunct schools ====
School	City	State	Type	
Allynwood Academy	Hancock	NY		Closed
Diamond Ranch Academy	Hurricane	UT		
Elan School	Poland	ME		Abandoned
Glen Mills Schools	Glen Mills	PA		Closed
Hidden Lake Academy and Ridge Creek	Dahlonega	GA	wilderness+	Closed
Monarch School	Heron	MT		Closed
Mount Bachelor Academy	Prineville	OR		Closed
Oak Creek Ranch School	Cornville	AZ		
Oakley School	Oakley	UT		
Shepherd's Hill Academy	Martin	GA	wilderness	
Spring Ridge Academy	Mayer	AZ		Closed
Asheville Academy (formally Solstice East)	Weaverville	NC	Residential	Closed

=== Canada ===
- Pine River Institute, Ontario.
- Venture Academy, Alberta and Ontario
- Applewood Academy, Ontario (no new students as of 2025)

Source: Experience Boarding

=== Mexico ===
- Positive Impact, Bahia de Kino. Closed in 2005.
- Casa by the Sea. Closed in 2004 due to abuse.

== See also ==
- Troubled teen industry
- Teen escort companies
- Category:Troubled teen programs
- Category:Residential treatment centers
- Category:Therapeutic boarding schools
- International Survivors Action Committee (ISAC, 2000s activist group)

In media:

- Hell Camp: Teen Nightmare (2023 film by Liza Williams)
- Help at Any Cost (Book by Maia Szalavitz)
- The Program: Cons, Cults, and Kidnapping (2024 miniseries)
- This is Paris (2020 documentary about Paris Hilton)
- Wayward (2025 miniseries)
