= Elevations RTC =

Residential treatment center in Syracuse, Utah, United States

Coordinates: 41.076003°N 112.076433°W

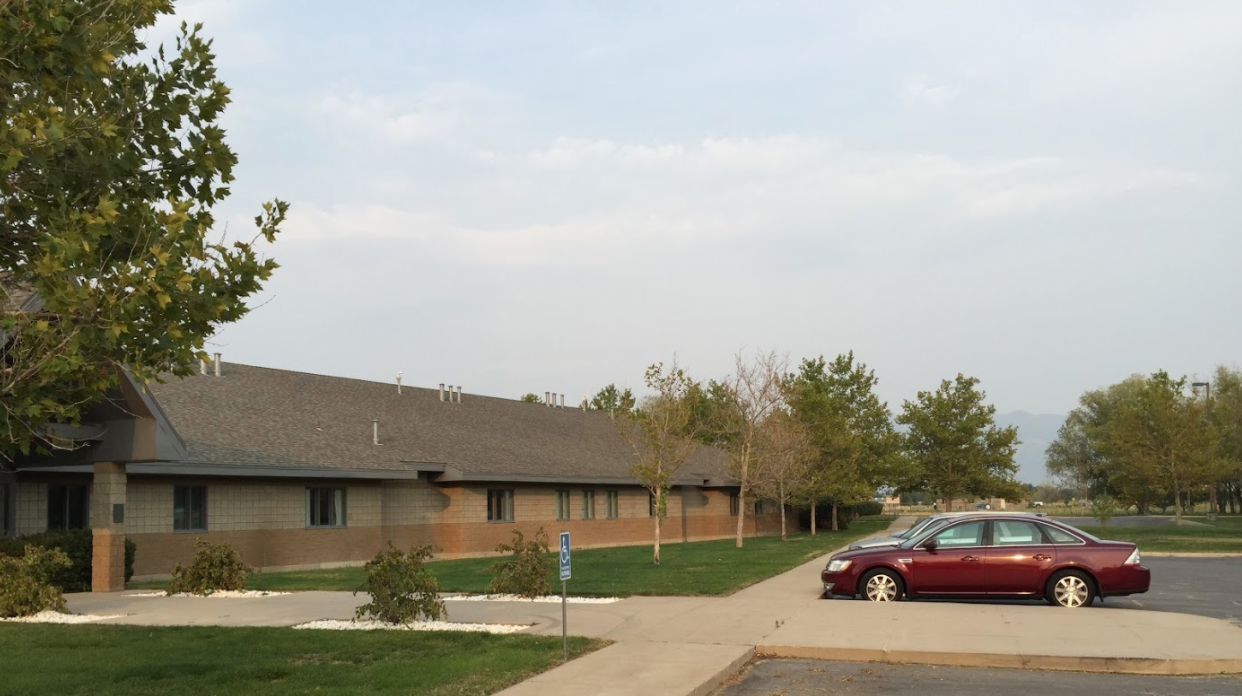

Location
- 2650 W 2700 S Syracuse, Davis County, Utah 84075

Information
- Former name: Island View Residential Treatment Center
- School type: For-Profit Insurance Accepted No Financial Aid Accepted, Residential Treatment Center, Secured/Locked Facility
- Religious affiliation: Non-Denominational
- Founded: 1994; rebranded in 2014
- Founders: W. Dean Belnap, Lorin A. Broadbent, Jared U. Balmer, Steven Dale Lancaster, and W. Kimball DeLaMare
- Status: Open
- Oversight: Utah Department of Health and Human Services
- NCES School ID: A0109535
- Dean: Ryan Mortensen
- Teaching staff: 10.0 (on an FTE basis)
- Age range: 13 to 18
- International students: Student and Exchange Visitor Program approved to accept foreign students
- Student to teacher ratio: 4.3
- Classes offered: Social Studies, Mathematics, English, Science, Music and Art
- Hours in school day: 6
- Campus type: Secured/Locked
- Accreditations: Joint Commission (JCAHO) Cognia/AdvancED (Academic)
- Tuition: $300,000 annually
- Feeder schools: blueFire Wilderness, Wingate Wilderness, Viewpoint Center, and other Family Help & Wellness Programs
- Feeder to: The Approach Transition House and other Family Help & Wellness Programs
- Affiliation: National Association of Therapeutic Schools and Programs (NATSAP)
- Alumni: Misha Osherovich; Sophie Nyweide
- Provider Company: Family Help & Wellness (d/b/a Wilderness Training & Consulting, LLC and f/k/a Aspen Education Group)
- Resident Pserofile: ADD/ADHD, Adoption/Attachment Issues, Anxiety, ASD, Bipolar, Depression, Divorce Issues, Grief, Learning Disability, Low Self-Esteem, OCD, Substance Abuse, Trauma
- Website: https://www.elevationsrtc.com/

Elevations RTC is a residential treatment center in Syracuse, Utah, for teens ages 13–18. The facility was formerly known as Island View Residential Treatment Center until 2014, when it was acquired by Syracuse RTC, LLC, which does business as Elevations RTC. The Elevations campus is shared with Seven Stars and ViewPoint Center.

== History ==
=== Syracuse campus ===
The Syracuse campus opened in 1994 as the Island View Residential Treatment Center. Its founders were W. Dean Belnap, MD, Lorin Broadbent, DSW, Jared Balmer, PhD, and W. Kimball DeLaMare, LCSW. They had been associated previously with other similar treatment programs.

In 2004, Aspen Education Group acquired Island View. CRC Health Group, a company owned by Bain Capital, purchased Aspen Education for $300 million in 2006. Aspen and CRC Health Group owned and operated the Syracuse campus until 2014.

=== Rebranding and acquisition ===
In April 2014, Syracuse RTC, LLC acquired Island View and changed the name to Elevations RTC and absorbed most of its employees.

Elevations describes itself as a "residential treatment center that works with students of all genders". The facility today caters to a large population of transgender and gender non-conforming teens, partially caused by the lack of other treatment centers that accept transgender students in their programs. Island View and Elevations have been accused of acting as de facto conversion therapy centers.

Elevations belongs to the National Association for Therapeutic Schools and Programs (NATSAP), a membership program and trade organization.

Elevations also has a co-ed transitional living program called The Approach for students ages 15 to 19 who have completed the therapeutic program at Elevations.

=== Partnership with Family Help and Wellness ===
Elevations is partnered with Family Help & Wellness. It provides management, financial, and marketing support to Elevations’ ownership team.

Family Help & Wellness is owned by private equity investors Trinity Hunt Partners who first invested in 2014.

Family Help grew by taking over defunct facilities from other troubled teen companies. The company's founder, Tim Dupell, was the executive vice president and CFO of Aspen Education from 1999 until 2004. Dupell also served as the CEO of Family Help until 2017.

In 2024, NBC News reported that several Family Help & Wellness programs had faced state sanctions and licensing actions. Earlier that year, one of its facilities, Trails Carolina, a wilderness therapy program in North Carolina, lost its license after the death of a 12-year-old boy who suffocated in a weather-proof sleeping sack on his first night at the camp. The death was ruled a homicide; Trails Carolina denied wrongdoing, and no criminal charges have been filed. The report also noted that multiple Family Help & Wellness programs were cited by state regulators for failing to report critical incidents, including injuries and alleged abuse, and for preventing children from contacting licensing agencies.

== Programming ==
The program at Elevations includes individual, family, and group therapy, an educational program, and recreation activities. The Elevations School is accredited by Cognia. Most classes at Elevations meet college entrance requirements.

Elevations utilizes a level system consisting of five tiers. Students in higher levels have additional privileges.

The base level is the Orientation Phase and the status is referred to as "Community Break", which is designed for students who have violated rules and are significantly disrupting the community. While on Community Break, students may not communicate with peers and at night may be required to sleep in the hallway. Students may be on Community Break for considerable lengths of time, often with other restrictions or sanctions.

The facility utilizes a de-escalation or time-out room for kids who are overstimulated and need to regulate away from the community. Teens can be restrained by staff.

Phone use at Elevations is restricted. Students are permitted to write letters to family.

Tuition at Elevations costs approximately $25,000 per month, which is more than $300,000 per year. According to Elevations, the average stay is eight to ten months, although students often stay there much longer. Insurance companies have denied coverage on the grounds that long-term care at Elevations is not medically necessary.

Elevations provides parents a list of common appeals new students say to return home. Common statements include "I feel unsafe, they treat us like we are in prison, the faculty are trying to brainwash us, and they lied to you about what this place is, it is nothing like they said." Parents are told these statements are either exaggerations or lies and to avoid such "parenting traps".

The therapeutic methods used at Elevations RTC were also used at Island View RTC. When asked by the Huffington Post about numerous allegations of abuse, a representative from parent company Family Health and Wellness addressed the claim in a statement, "Our treatment team employs a variety of therapeutic methods to help these teens, all of which are in compliance with state regulations and in line with our accreditation".

== Controversy ==
=== Allegations of abuse and mistreatment ===
Former residents at Island View and Elevations have alleged experiencing some form of physical, sexual, or psychological abuse at the Syracuse facility. They describe staff tormenting and abusing them, and leaving the program with more trauma than they came in with. Former residents have also reported that sedatives were given at Island View to quell disobedience.

In 2024, a previous resident filed a lawsuit against Elevations RTC and one of its therapists, alleging that the facility "abducted" the teenager from Washington, D.C. when he was 15 years old. The lawsuit further asserts that the teen was unlawfully detained against his mother's desires and subjected to mistreatment and neglect while under Elevations' supervision.

The Utah Department of Human Services Office of Licensing investigated a 2020 incident in which a student's head was hit by a staffer's head and again by the ground while the staff restrained the teen. Following the incident, Elevations terminated the staff member, the student returned home, and an employee reported an abuse allegation to Child Protective Services.

In 2018, a former Elevations RTC student filed a lawsuit against the facility, alleging that she sustained a traumatic brain injury three years earlier after being slammed to the ground during a restraint and that staff failed to provide medical treatment for approximately six days.

In 2014, the Utah Department of Human Services detailed students' claims that staff at Elevations were mistreating them, including using restraint on them too often when unwarranted and belittling them.

Around the time the facility was renamed Elevations RTC, Island View was involved with several lawsuits, including a highly publicized one with Dr. Phil, which were subsequently dismissed. The lawsuit which included Dr. Phil alleged that a teenage girl's arm was broken and its main nerve severely damaged during an incident with staff at Island View after Dr. Phil had offered to pay for the girl's treatment there following a 2013 appearance on his TV show.

Several former residents of the center claimed in 2012 that they had received inadequate medical care during their time there, and that they had been subjected to solitary confinement and other harsh physical and psychological treatment.

In 2007, the disappearance of a then 15-year-old resident, Emily Graeber, made headlines after she escaped from the facility. Emily stayed on a Southwest Airlines flight that was headed to Utah. Instead of deplaning in Utah, the teen remained onboard during its connecting flight to San Francisco, where she hid for 18 days in the suburb of San Leandro. She was punished for running away by being put in isolation for 58 days, which included not being allowed to speak or even make eye contact with the other residents, as well as being forced to urinate on herself. Her dramatic disappearance and continued outspoken activism has played a major role in exposing alleged abuses at Island View, Elevations, and the troubled teen industry as a whole.

In 2004, a 16-year-old boy hanged himself in a bathroom at Island View. Island View was required to submit a plan of corrective action. The staff were unsuccessful in reviving him.

In 2002, a former resident filed a $135 million lawsuit against her father in part for having her admitted to Island View where she says she was traumatized.

The local police department responded to 219 emergency calls at the facility's address between January 2005 and October 2020. Some of the calls have been related to abuse, sex offenses, or suicide attempts. In approximately 88% of those calls, the investigating department indicated nothing more was needed than a visit to the site. Only 14 calls, roughly 6%, resulted in arrests.

=== Activism ===
Former Island View and Elevations resident Misha Osherovich attended a rally held by Paris Hilton in protest of alleged abuse at Provo Canyon School and programs for at-risk youth, where they spoke out about the abuse allegations. Osherovich also about their experience at Island View to the Salt Lake Tribune. Osherovich has likened what the facility did to conversion therapy. The American Bar Association with Osherovich, Hilton, Oregon State Senator Sara Gelser, and others, explored youth being funneled into prison-like "behavior modification" centers under the guise of treatment and conversion therapy.

More recently, in 2023, another survivor of Island View, Kayla Muzquiz, joined Senator Jeff Merkley, Senator John Cornyn, Representatives Ro Khanna and Earl “Buddy” Carter, Paris Hilton, Jessica Jackson, and other survivors of abuse in residential treatment facilities to introduce the Stop Institutional Child Abuse Act. Muzquiz spoke about her traumatic experience at Island View.

=== Program origins ===
Jared Balmer, Kimball Delamare, Lorin Broadbent, and W. Dean Belnap founded Island View. Balmer later expanded the campus and opened Aspen Institute for Behavioral Assessment (now Viewpoint Center). In addition, Balmer, Delamare, and Broadbent opened the now-closed Oakley School, a therapeutic boarding school, in 1998. Delamare and Balmer were also founding members of the National Association for Therapeutic Schools and Programs (NATSAP), Delamare being NATSAP's first president.

Prior to Island View, Kimball Delamare was the director of KIDS of Salt Lake, an offshoot of Straight Inc., which was investigated and ultimately had its license revoked. Delamare also worked as a director of the Rivendell Psychiatric Hospital, which Balmer cofounded and was the subject of multiple allegations, including from one former resident and journalist, Lyn Duff.
