= Aspen Education Group =

American company that provides therapeutic interventions

- Formation: 1997; 29 years ago
- Purpose: Therapeutic Interventions
- Headquarters: Cerritos, California, U.S.
- Region served: 14 U.S. states and the United Kingdom
- Parent organization: CRC Health Group
- Website: Aspeneducation.com
- Formerly called: Aspen Youth Services

Aspen Education Group is an American company that provides controversial therapeutic interventions for adolescents and young adults. At its peak, it owned dozens of residential programs including wilderness therapy programs, residential treatment centers, therapeutic boarding schools, and weight loss programs. Starting in the 2000s, some of these programs were accused of torture, abuse, and neglect leading to the death of multiple residents. By 2013, most were closed and as of 2023, only a few programs remain active.

Since November 2006, Aspen Education Group, with corporate offices located in Cerritos, California has been a division of Bain Capital's CRC Health.

== History ==
Aspen Education Group, Inc. was formed in December 1997 as a spin-off of College Health Enterprises. In 1998, Aspen was reported to have annual revenues of $28 million. That same year, the Sprout Group and Frazier Healthcare Ventures of Seattle purchased major interests in the company. In 2002, Aspen obtained an investment of $15 million from Warburg Pincus and $48 million or more in loans from CapitalSource and Caltius Mezzanine. For 2006, it projected revenue of $150 million. In late 2006, Bain Capital acquired Aspen Education Group for $300 million. Private equity investors were attracted to the business because, unlike most educational companies, its revenue comes from payments by private individuals rather than from government sources. In 2005, The New York Times reported that analysts estimated that companies like Aspen had profits between 10 and 20 percent of their revenues.

In and around 2009, Aspen closed six programs. In March 2011, Aspen announced its intention to close five additional programs and consolidate three others citing "reduced demand for therapeutic schools and programs in today's economy". The closed programs include Bromley Brook School, New Leaf Academy of Oregon, NorthStar Center, Aspen Ranch and SunHawk Adolescent Recovery Center. In addition, the program at Aspen Achievement Academy merged into Outback Therapeutic Expeditions. Youth Care of Utah merged into Island View Residential Treatment Center, and Passages to Recovery moved to the SUWS Adolescent Program to expand the services offered there. In July 2013, Aspen announced that another five of its programs (Academy at Swift River, Stone Mountain School, Talisman Academy, Adirondack Leadership Expeditions, and SUWS Adolescent & Youth Programs of Idaho) would close later that summer.

== Programs ==
=== Active ===
Active programs are listed in the table below, sortable by name, type or location. Most programs are members of the National Association of Therapeutic Schools and Programs (NATSAP); several have additional affiliations, such as the National Association of Therapeutic Wilderness Camping.

Therapy Programs
Name	Type	Location	Description
Talisman Camps	Wilderness therapy	North Carolina	Summer Camps for Teens with nonverbal learning disorder and autism spectrum disorders.
Turn-About Ranch	Residential treatment	Escalante, Utah	Short-term coeducational therapy program, with a Christian-based philosophy, licensed as a residential treatment center and located on a working cattle ranch. Enrolls ages 13 to 18.
Youth Care of Utah	Residential treatment	Draper, Utah	Residential treatment center with enrollment limited to 45 students ages 12–18. Provides mental health and chemical dependency diagnosis. Academic services include the opportunity to do online classes with BYU if qualified. Must enter at least 90 days before 18th birthday.

=== Closed ===
Closed/Former Programs
Program Name	Location	Description	Closure
Academy at Swift River	Cummington, Massachusetts	Co-educational college preparatory therapeutic boarding school for adolescents aged 14–17 1/2.	unknown
Adirondack Leadership Expeditions	Saranac Lake, New York	A "character-development wilderness program for troubled teens". An average stay of 45 days, using a dense forest environment for the hikes.	Closed in September 2013.
Aspen Institute for Behavioral Assessment	Syracuse, Utah	Conducted assessments needed to develop intervention and treatment plans for troubled adolescents.	Became independently owned as ViewPoint Center in May 2014.
Aspen Achievement Academy	Southern Utah	For adolescents 13-17. Minimum stay was 35 days.	In March 2011, Aspen announced that this program would be consolidated into Outback Therapeutic Expeditions.
Aspen Ranch	Loa, Utah	For adolescents aged 13–17 1/2; used an equine therapy program. Length of stay ranged from 9–24 months.	Closure plans announced in March 2011.
Bromley Brook School	Manchester Center, Vermont	Boarding school for girls ages 14–18	Closure announced in March 2011.
Camp Huntington	High Falls, New York	Co-educational, residential, summer camps for children and young adults who have special needs such as autism spectrum disorder, pervasive developmental disorder, and cognitive impairment.	Closed in August 2021, site now owned by Camp Migdal as of July 2022.
Cedars Academy	Bridgeville, Delaware	Boarding school for boys and girls ages 11–18 specializing in Asperger syndrome and Nonverbal Learning Disorder. There are also 18- to 21-year-olds living off-campus in a young adult transitional program	Closed August 2009.
Copper Canyon Academy	Rimrock, Arizona	Girls only boarding school with a structured therapeutic environment for ages 13–17, acquired by Aspen Education in 2002.	Closed April 2014.
Excel Academy	Conroe, Texas	Coeducational boarding school for grades 9 to 12	Closed November 2008
Four Circles Recovery Center	Blue Ridge Mountains in North Carolina	A wilderness-based treatment program for older teens and young adults ages 18–28 with substance abuse and co-occurring mental health disorders, combining traditional counseling, wilderness experiences and a 12-step program.	Closed in 2018, website says that they are no longer accepting new patients.
Island View Residential Treatment Center	Syracuse, Utah	Academic services and therapeutic programs for adolescents aged 13 to 18. The academic program at Island View is accredited with the Utah Department of Education, the California Department of Education and the Northwest Association of Schools and Colleges. Must be admitted at least six months before 18th birthday.	In 2014, this facility became independently owned and was renamed Elevations RTC.
Lone Star Expeditions	Davy Crockett National Forest	Wilderness intervention for youth ages 13–17 and their families	Closed April 6, 2009
Mount Bachelor Academy	Prineville, Oregon	Co-educational, ages 13–18 experiencing emotional and behavioral disorders including: Minor Depressive Disorder, Oppositional Defiant Disorder, Substance Abuse, and ADHD as well families struggling with adoption issues. Founded in 1987 by College Health Enterprises; around 1998 they spun off MBA and a handful of other facilities into the company that became Aspen Education Group.	Following actions by the Oregon Department of Human Services, closure of the school was announced Monday, November 9, 2009. In October 2010, the state of Oregon withdrew its orders and actions against MBA in return for recognition that DHS had a "reasonable" basis to investigate the charges.
New Leaf Academy	Hendersonville, North Carolina	Private boarding school for girls aged 10 to 14 upon admission	North Carolina location closed June 2010. Aspen announced that The Talisman School would open on its site in August 2010 to enroll youth with autism spectrum disorders. Twenty-seven students remaining at New Leaf North Carolina were to be sent to New Leaf Oregon and to the Bromley Brook School.
New Leaf Academy	Bend, Oregon	Private boarding school for girls ages 10 to 14 upon admission	In March 2011, Aspen announced plans to close the Oregon location at the end of the 2010–2011 academic year.
NorthStar Center	Bend, Oregon	Young-adult transitional-living program for ages 17 1/2 to 24 for treatment of substance abuse and addiction. Established in 1991, NorthStar operated independently until 1998, when it was acquired by the Aspen Education Group.	Closure announced in March 2011
Oakley School	Oakley, Utah	Co-educational college preparatory therapeutic boarding school.	Closed on June 30, 2017.
Outback Therapeutic Expeditions	Lehi, Utah	For ages 13–17 with academic credit available. Aspen Achievement Academy merged into Outback Therapeutic Expeditions March 2011.	Announced closure by letter on May 1, 2023, will close on June 15, 2023.
Passages to Recovery	Southern Utah	A 35- to 50-day intensive outdoor drug and alcohol treatment program for young adults ages 18 and over.	In March 2011, Aspen announced that it was consolidating this program into its SUWS program in Idaho.
Pine Ridge Academy	Draper, Utah	Therapeutic boarding school and residential treatment center enrolling ages of 11 to 18	Closed June 2009
SageWalk	Redmond, Oregon	For boys and girls ages 13–17 with emotional and behavioral problems. The minimum stay was 30 days, after which participants often transferred to a therapeutic boarding school or other long-term facility. The average was 60 days for the "Family Reunification Plan".	Operations suspended on public land pending the investigation of the August 2009 death of Sergey Blashchishena.
Stone Mountain School	Black Mountain, North Carolina	Therapeutic boarding school established in 1990, for boys aged 11–16, specializing in ADHD and learning differences. Program website makes reference to finding a cure by going back to the Tom Sawyer era. The school operated under a Special Use permit issued by the U.S. Forest Service in the Pisgah and Nantahala National Forests.	unknown
SUWS of the Carolinas	North Carolina	A "therapeutic wilderness program with a focus on clinical intervention and assessment" for ages 13–17 and a wilderness treatment program for younger children, ages 10–13.	Closed May 15, 2023.
Talisman Academy	North Carolina	An academic program for grades 7–12 for students with nonverbal learning disorder and autism spectrum disorders.	Closed after the summer of 2013.
Talisman Transitions	North Carolina	An independent living program for young adults ages 18 to 24 with asperger syndrome, nonverbal learning disorder, high-functioning autism and similar autism spectrum disorders.	Closed after the summer of 2013.
SunHawk Academy of Utah	Utah	Residential treatment program and boarding school for teens aged 13–17	Closure plans announced in March 2011.
Wellspring Academies (formerly Academy of the Sierras)	Reedley, California	Year-round boarding schools for overweight or obese teens.	Closed in July 2013.
Wellspring Camp La Jolla	La Jolla, California	Co-ed outdoor program for ages 10–24 and for families.	Closed in March 2017
Wellspring New York	Adirondack Mountains	Weight loss program for women ages 12–24.	Closed on an unknown date.
Wellspring Adventure Camp North Carolina	Canton, North Carolina, Blue Ridge Mountains	Co-ed program for ages 11–17	Closed on an unknown date.
Wellspring Adventure Lake Tahoe	Incline Village, Nevada, Sierra Nevada College	Co-ed outdoor program for ages 11–18.	Closed on an unknown date.
Wellspring Texas	San Marcos, Texas	Co-ed weight loss program for teens aged 12–17	Closed on an unknown date.
Wellspring Wisconsin	Platteville, Wisconsin	Co-ed weight loss program for teens aged 11–17.	Closed on an unknown date.
Wellspring Oregon	Corvallis, Oregon, campus of Oregon State University	Co-ed weight loss program for teens aged 11–18.	Closed on an unknown date.
Wellspring Georgia	Rome, Georgia, campus of Berry College	Co-ed weight loss program for teens aged 11–17.	Closed on an unknown date.
Wellspring DC	Washington, D.C., campus of Foxcroft School	Co-ed weight loss program for teens aged 11–24.	Closed on an unknown date.
Wellspring Pennsylvania	Poconos in Pennsylvania	Weight loss program for ages 11–24	Closed on an unknown date.
Wellspring Hawaii	Big Island, Hawaii	Co-ed weight loss program for teens aged 13–18.	unknown
Wellspring Vancouver	Vancouver, British Columbia	Co-ed weight loss program for teens aged 12–18.	unknown
Wellspring UK	Devon, England, campus of Exeter University	Co-ed weight loss program for teens aged 12–18.	Appears to have closed after the summer of 2014.

== Controversies and criticisms ==
The Aspen Education Group in 2005 was the target of criticism related to the large revenues its programs generated, and the charge that they take advantage of parents in desperate situations. The Group has been closing programs since then, citing the difficulty in keeping enrollment numbers up, such as when the Oakley School announced on its website in May 2017 that it would be closing.

=== Complaints of abuse and torture in Aspen programs ===
In April 2014, a mother claimed in court that her teenage daughter was taken from Texas by a human trafficker and locked up at a secret "private prison" in Utah, where she was made to perform "mindless tasks of blind obedience". The complaint states that "[o]nce confined, no contact with the outside world is allowed, except with the persons transferring custody to the prison. Contact with family members or friends is not allowed, and even contact with the family member or agency that transferred full and complete custody to the prison is monitored, and the inmate knows that any disparaging remark or complaint about the prison will be punished by a loss of all privileges earned, meaning having to start at the bottom all over again to rise from level to level by successfully completing mindless tasks of blind obedience."

In January 2014, the family of a teenage girl who claims she was berated on television by Dr. Phil, and then sent to a residential treatment center owned by Aspen where she was falsely imprisoned, filed a civil complaint in federal court accusing Aspen Education Group "slavery", "abuse", and "false imprisonment". The girl and her mother appeared on the "Dr. Phil" show in February 2013. In the episode, the teen admitted to having sex with adult men she met online, which the family called "bizarre and dangerous conduct" in their lawsuit. To help the family, Dr. Phil paid for the daughter to enroll at Aspen's Island View Residential Treatment Center. In their suit, the family calls the facility a "private prison" where their daughter was deprived her of freedom, privacy, education, and subjected to "involuntary servitude, and unjust unusual punishments." In one incident, the daughter apparently refused to obey staff members who told her to get off of her bed. When staff members tried to pull her off, her right arm "was badly and perhaps irreparably broken, and its main nerve severely damaged", the lawsuit states. The family also claims the teenage girl's constitutional rights were violated and she was falsely imprisoned, as well as alleging conspiracy and fraud.

In 2012, a mother sued Aspen Education Group alleging that her daughter was "tortured" at Turn About Ranch, Aspen's residential treatment center in Escalante, Utah. The complaint alleged that staff at the residential treatment center subjected the 15-year-old girl to hours of stress positions, threats of suffocation, exposure to animal abuse and regular public humiliation. On December 11, 2013, the case was dismissed under the two-year statute of limitations that applies for claims involving a health care provider.

On August 1, 2011, a girl and her father filed suit against CRC Health Group, Aspen, the school and employees. The plaintiffs claimed the defendants were negligent, careless and reckless in their hiring, training and supervision of the teacher, their care, supervision and treatment of the girl, and in their failure to properly investigate and report the misconduct allegations. The father asserted the boarding school breached its contract with him by failing to provide a safe educational environment and proper treatment, and by failing to properly investigate and disclose the teacher's sexual misconduct. The plaintiffs further asserted Aspen and the other defendants were vicariously liable for the actions and negligence of their employees. The plaintiffs also asserted that Aspen's and the school's failure to provide a proper education to the girl, a disabled person under federal law, violated the Americans with Disabilities Act. The plaintiffs asserted an assault claim against the teacher as well. The father and daughter sought compensatory and punitive damages, attorney's fees, and costs of suit. A settlement was reached with Aspen and the other parties, and the case was dismissed on June 25, 2012.

In 2010, a mother and her son sued Aspen alleging that while the son was a student at a boarding school owned by Aspen, Cedars Academy, he was sexually assaulted and threatened by a fellow student. The same year, an action was brought against Aspen by a former student at a program owned by Aspen alleging that in July 2006, while in Utah, a former shift-supervisor at Aspen Ranch engaged in an inappropriate sexual relationship with her.

In 2009, neglect led to the death of a teen at the SageWalk wilderness program owned by Aspen; 16-year-old Sergey Blashchishen died of heatstroke on his very first school hike. One summer morning, the boy suited up in an 80-pound backpack; by afternoon, the heat had topped 80 degrees, and he was soon staggering, drifting off the trail, and complaining of dizziness and exhaustion. Staffers thought he was faking his symptoms and failed to call 911 until his pulse had stopped; his death is the focus of a negligent homicide investigation.

Also in 2009, the state of Oregon shut down two teen programs run by Aspen. State investigators found nine cases of abuse and neglect at Mount Bachelor Academy, including incidents of "sexualized role play", in which teenage girls were allegedly forced to give lap dances during therapy sessions. After Mount Bachelor and its director threatened costly lawsuits, Oregon's Department of Human Services softened the language of the report. Aspen claims the allegations are false.

This led to a lawsuit being filed in 2011, by 17 former Mount Bachelor Academy students, who claim intentional and negligent infliction of emotional distress, battery, breach of contract and negligence arising out of their treatment at the therapeutic boarding school. Aspen Education Group is among the defendants in the litigation, and the plaintiffs seek a total of $26 million in the abuse lawsuit.

Two more suits were filed in November 2011 and January 2013, by 14 former and 13 former students, respectively, also alleging abuse. A total of $23 million in relief in the second suit and a total of $19.5 million in relief in the third suit. Aspen, also among the defendants in these two suits, intends to vigorously defend the pending lawsuits.

In 2008, Bromley Brook School teacher Steven Peters became involved in a sexual relationship with a 16-year-old student. The 40-year-old teacher subsequently pleaded guilty to sexual exploitation of a minor.

In 2004, a 14-year-old boy died at Aspen's Lone State Expeditions wilderness program. During the program, Matthew Meyer and his group hiked several miles in 90-degree weather. A combination of excessive heat, a constrictive uniform, and Matthew's obesity caused his body to overheat. He suffered a condition called hyperthermia, which is the most severe form of heatstroke and requires immediate medical attention. His mother, Crystal Manganaro, says "his body was literally burning up from the inside". Instead of taking the boy's situation seriously, program staffers admitted in a deposition they thought Matthew was joking. His complaints of numbness in his legs were ignored. They told him he was having an anxiety attack when he experienced shortness of breath, and dumped water on him after he vomited and collapsed on the ground. Matthew Meyer died an hour later at the hospital. As camp administrators would not tell the boy's mother what happened to her son, it took three and a half years of investigation and litigation to reveal the truth. In 2006, a wrongful death lawsuit was brought against Aspen Education Group over the incident, which Aspen later settled out of court.

=== Cost ===
With the cost of Aspen programs ranging from $200-$500 per day (amounting to $73,000 - $182,000 annually), and length of stays averaging from one month to two years, monetary concerns tend to arise for those funding treatment.

=== Deceptive marketing practices ===
Educational consultant Tom Croke has criticized Aspen for its marketing practices and for closing programs without sufficient regard for the harm done to students whose promised services were being disrupted. In a blog posting first published in May 2010, he expressed "grave reservations" about referring clients to Aspen programs in view of the company's loss of key staff and its record of abruptly closing programs. He noted, however, that in its 2011 program closures, Aspen had "been somewhat more careful about transitioning the affected residents of the facilities being closed", and that he was continuing to consider Aspen programs for some clients. Yet in April 2014, he provided an updated review on Aspen and again expressed on his website that he "cannot be confident that their facilities will not compromise the best interests of patients/ clients in order to increase earnings." His website cautioned "families not to enroll in their sons and daughters in the longer term former Aspen Schools and programs without adding a contractual provision that gives the family financial recourse in case of closing before the needs of their son or daughter have been met." As for schools and programs that are no longer owned by Aspen, he included that "[f]amilies should not hold the Aspen name against those schools and programs."

The Wellspring diet has been criticized by some lay observers. Wellspring is no longer Aspen owned. It has been sold to the organization RiverMend.

=== Treatment research lacks good science and questionable effectiveness in Aspen Education Group's programmes ===
Two reports are widely cited in Aspen program marketing and promotional materials: Report of Findings from a Multi-Center Study of Youth Outcomes in Private Residential Treatment (Aug 2006) and A Multi-Center, Longitudinal Study of Youth Outcomes in Private Residential Treatment Programs (April 2007; not publicly available, summary of select findings available via marketing materials). A conflict of interest exists, because Aspen funded the studies and owns the programs in them.

== In news and popular culture ==
Several Aspen Educational Group programs have been featured in the media:

- An article in the UK Sunday Mirror described the experiences of a teenage girl from England who attended Aspen Achievement Academy.
- The British television series "I Know What You Ate Last Summer" featured six obese teenagers attending Wellspring in California.
- The British TV documentary Britain's Youngest Boozers, broadcast October 25, 2005, featured the Aspen program SUWS of the Carolinas.
- Turn about Ranch was the program used in the second season of Brat Camp UK edition.
- Aspen Education programs have been featured multiple times on the Dr. Phil show in the United States.
- Passages to Recovery and NorthStar Center were featured on A&E Television Network's documentary series "Intervention".
- Aspen Education Group's programs were called a "carousel of treatment" in an article from Utah NPR

== See also ==
- CEDU
