= Behavioral treatment program =

Behavioral treatment programs include:

Psychological behavioral therapy in general, such as:

- Cognitive behavioral therapy

Congregate care facilities such as:

- Residential treatment center
- Therapeutic boarding school
- Wilderness therapy programs
