= Mount Bachelor Academy =

Defunct therapeutic boarding school in Prineville, Crook County, Oregon, United States

Location
- 33051 NE Ochoco Highway; Prineville, Crook County, Oregon 97754; United States; 44.465628°N 120.434618°W

Information
- Type: Private therapeutic boarding school
- Opened: 1987
- Closed: 2009
- Grades: 8-12
- Age range: 14-18
- Accreditation: NAAS, PNAIS
- Affiliations: NATSAP
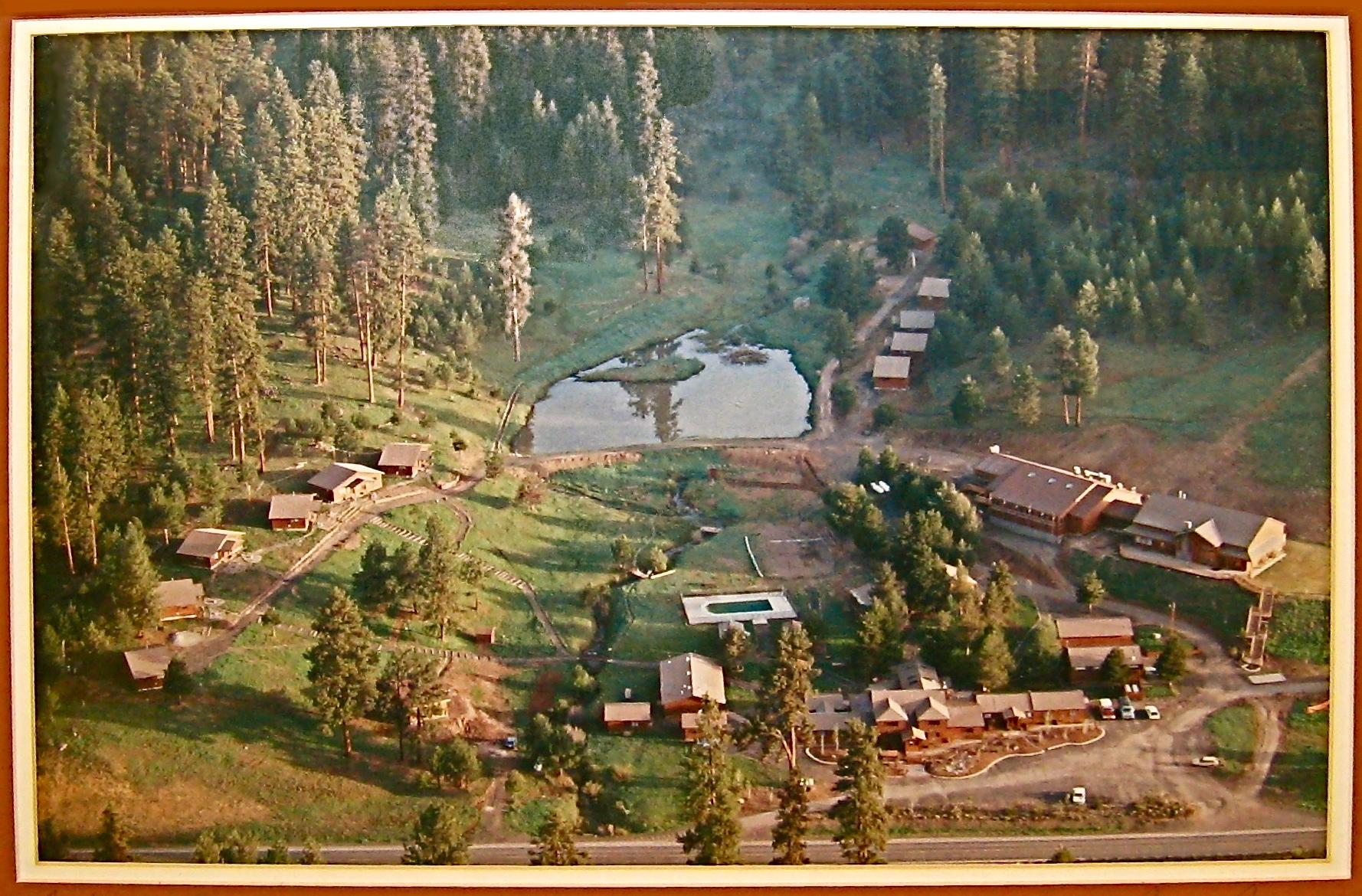

Mount Bachelor Academy (known as MBA) was an Oregon private co-educational therapeutic boarding school providing help to families of adolescents experiencing emotional and behavioral disorders including, minor Depressive Disorder, Oppositional Defiant Disorder, Substance abuse, and ADHD as well as help for teenagers and families struggling with adoption issues. The typical student was between 14 and 18 years of age. The average length of stay was 14 to 16 months.

The facility is located in Ochoco National Forest between the Central Oregon cities of Prineville and Mitchell and could accommodate 110 individuals.

== Academics ==
Mount Bachelor Academy offered a year-round academic curriculum and a low student-to-teacher ratio. MBA was special education approved and recognized by the Oregon Department of Education. The school had been accredited through the Northwest Association of Accredited Schools since 1994 and also accredited through the Pacific Northwest Association of Independent Schools.

== History ==
The school was founded in 1987 by College Health Enterprises under the direction of educator Linda Houghton. The school was originally to be located in Powell Butte, Oregon but eventually landed at the location of the former Mark's Creek Lodge. The site was at one point intended to be converted into a resort, then a youth camp. Finally it was approved as a private school to accommodate 60 students. It was expanded a number of times until it reached its current capacity. Around 1998, College Health Enterprises spun off MBA and a handful of other facilities into the company that became Aspen Education Group.

=== Investigations and court cases ===
In March 1998, four ex-employees and two parents alleged that high-risk students attending Mount Bachelor Academy were deprived of sleep, subjected to obscenity-laced tirades and forced to work in near-freezing temperatures overnight. The Oregon Department of Human Services cleared the program at MBA following their investigation.

In December 1998, 17-year-old Brandon H. died outside the facility. The death was investigated by the Crook County Sheriff's Search and Rescue and the Crook County Coroner's office and ruled a suicide.

In December 2007, a search was conducted for a group of teenagers and staff members, which had been delayed by snow during a wilderness trip. The "very well-equipped" group of 10 campers and 3 staff with wilderness survival training and experience, including wilderness "first-responder" training reported in by cell phone and returned without incident.

In June 2008, an Oregon state licensing inspector visited Mount Bachelor Academy during license renewal. The inspectors report stated the school had "a lot of outdoor activities, a seasoned staff and a program that requires parents to be involved."

On March 31, 2009, the Oregon Department of Human Services (DHS) sends "confusing" letter to parents of students at MBA suggesting they prepare to move their children out of the school. MBA receives hundreds of letters of support from parents and alumni. State later notifies parents that "there is no imminent threat of closing MBA."

In April 2009, the school became the target of an investigation into allegations of child abuse. A Time online article appears to imply that the U.S. Supreme Court case, Forest Grove v. TA, is related to the investigation being conducted by the DHS.

In June 2009, after hearing arguments in the case Forest Grove School District v. T.A., the U.S. Supreme Court hands down a decision affirming that the Individuals with Disabilities Education Act covers a claim for reimbursement made against a public school system for a student diagnosed with disabilities and subsequently enrolled at MBA.

On November 3, 2009, the Oregon Department of Human Services suspended MBA's operating license and ordered the school's temporary closure due to findings of child abuse and neglect. In parallel, DHS provides the Crook County Sheriff's Office with the report of their investigation. The Crook County Sheriff's Office Operations Commander reported that DHS had not made him aware of their [7 month long] investigation - something he felt was out of the ordinary. The commander was quoted as saying "It's an unusual investigation not to include the Sheriff's Office if they're looking at criminal charges."

On November 9, 2009, Aspen Education Group announced that the school would close permanently by December 9, 2009.

In December 2009, MBA requested a hearing with Oregon officials to contest the schools suspended license and closure. By March 2010, MBA and Oregon DHS agree to settle on the suspension and closure.

In December 2009, MBA executive director Sharon Bitz filed a legal suit contesting the charges made against her.

In April 2010, Executive Director Sharon Bitz and representatives of MBA submitted claims against the state for damages resulting from the DHS actions.

In July 2010, Lawyers for Aspen Education filed a suit contesting the substantiated findings of abuse and neglect.

In October 2010, the state of Oregon withdrew its orders and actions against MBA in return for recognition that DHS had a "reasonable" basis to investigate the charges. The school remained closed. The agreement stipulates, "The findings as regards MBA will be modified to replace the ‘substantiated’ with the following two sentences: ‘Based on the evidence available to the Department (DHS), the Department found that there is reasonable cause to believe that abuse or neglect occurred. The Department’s conclusion is based on evidence collected solely by the Department as of Nov. 2, 2009 and not on information provided or available after that date.'" DHS director of children, adults and families, Erinn Kelley-Siel made the following statement:

"MBA acknowledged that based on the evidence available to DHS on Nov. 2, 2009, the agency had reasonable cause to believe that abuse or neglect occurred at the school as uncovered by the investigation, In addition, MBA agrees that DHS had a reasonable basis to investigate the allegations of abuse and neglect and to seek corrective actions."

Aspen Education Group President, Phil Herschman made the following statements:

"The DHS’ withdrawal of its order suspending MBA’s license supports our position that they did not have justification for that order in the first place," and, "The [Department of Health Services] has acknowledged with this settlement that in fact there was additional evidence no abuse had occurred." His statement added "Despite the tragic circumstances of Mount Bachelor [Academy’s] closure, we hope to open a new, even more successful school on the MBA campus in the future."

In July 2011, some former students of the school sued the school and the two companies that owned it, claiming intentional and negligent infliction of emotional distress, as well as other torts. The nine plaintiffs sought approximately $14.3 million in damages. In November 2011, another suit was filed by an additional 11 students, alleging humiliation, physical and sexual and seeking $23 million in damages.

In December 2013, three lawsuits filed by Oregon lawyer, Kelly Clark are taken over by partners of the law firm O’Donnell Clark & Crew LLP, as a result of the unexpected death of Clark. Maria Ruckwardt and Steve Crew are to handle the case going forward.

In January 2015, After informing Crook County Circuit Judge Daniel J. Ahern on February 6, 2014, of "an agreement among the majority of the parties" to mediate the cases, Attorney Maria Ruckwardt, of O’Connell Clark & Crew LLP, reported "[all three] cases got resolved without court intervention." Court records indicate that on November 17, 2014, the first two cases were dismissed with prejudice — meaning they cannot be brought again and that the third case was dismissed on September 16, 2014, again not being able to be brought again. The Bend Bulletin reported that "[b]ecause of confidentiality requirements, Ruckwardt said she could not disclose whether the plaintiffs received compensation."

== Program ==
The roots of the therapeutic curriculum originated at CEDU and incorporate elements of the therapeutic community or milieu therapy model. The history of CEDU is largely the history of the development of parent-choice, private-pay residential programs. A significant number of the schools in the Emotional Growth/Therapeutic schools industry were developed or strongly influenced by people who were originally inspired by their CEDU experience. The principles on which the MBA program was founded include Soul Searching and Emotional Growth.

In 1995 MBA Executive Director Tim Brace was interviewed about various aspects of the school. The article described the program as follows: Unlike public schools, the students day didn't begin with academics. Instead they met with the faculty and discussed the goals for the day. Then classes ran from 9:00 to 2:40 where students studied regular academic curricula. Afternoons alternated between extracurricular activities like sports or the arts and communications skills workshops. These workshops were described as a type of group therapy. According to Brace, students would "yell, scream, cry and laugh." The workshops were a difficult series of soul-searching and emotional growth activities called "Lifesteps." At the time there were nine Lifesteps which were described collectively as "a journey toward emotional growth and emotional health." The idea was to help students come to grip with their past and to address their future. Brace described the process as an opportunity for the students to, "Discover who they really are in a safe, non-judgmental and yet stimulating and educational environment. All young people are good at heart," he added, "and these are kids that need another chance, and we help them realize that inside they are really incredible, beautiful human beings."

Lifesteps were described as learning about truth and honesty and progressing toward discovering "real" friends, goals and dreams and finally with contributing to society. Each step was designed to foster responsibility and a sense of community. The program incorporated outdoor activities and traveling outside the country. Students near to completing the Lifesteps program earned privileges.

The school had strict rules, no smoking, drinking, violence or sex. Students weren't allowed radios in the dorm rooms until 2008, 1 year before the school's closure, and no one was allowed to have caffeinated drinks. Students who violated the rules were met with varying degrees of discipline. One form of discipline was a sort of time out called a self-study. It was a writing assignment and prohibition from talking to peers for a given period of time.

Self study

Described as discipline for running away or breaking other codes (agreements), a self-study is being left alone to do some soul-searching assignments.

LifeSteps

Intended to foster emotional growth and civic responsibility, LifeSteps encourage students to examine personal values and adopt positive self identities. LifeSteps are described as intense workshops some lasting a day to three days. The La Mancha LifeStep became an 18-day field trip. The school updated the LifeSteps program around 2002.

1994/1995 Timeframe	2002 - 2008	Summer 2009	Note
First Step - The Truth	eliminated
The Bridge	The Bridge	Transition Workshop 1	"LifeStep" and their names dropped
Forever Young	Forever Young	Transition Workshop 2
The Castle	eliminated
The Promise	The Promise	Transition Workshop 3
Venture I	Venture	Transition Workshop 4
Venture II	eliminated
La Mancha	==>	==>	La Mancha becomes a voluntary field trip.
Veritas	Veritas	Transition Workshop 5

== See also ==
- Attack therapy
- Large Group Awareness Training
- Family therapy
- Milieu therapy
