= New Leaf Academy =

Private therapeutic boarding school in Bend, Oregon, United States

Coordinates: 44.079108°N 121.239098°W

Location
- 63140 Dickey Rd; Bend, Oregon; United States

Information
- Type: Private therapeutic boarding school
- Opened: 1997
- NCES School ID: A9903539
- Executive Director: Craig Christiansen
- Gender: All-girls
- Age range: 10 - 14 at time of enrollment
- Enrollment: 16
- Accreditations: NWAC, CARF
- Website: www.newleafacademy.com

New Leaf Academy is a private therapeutic boarding school in Bend, Oregon, enrolling girls ages 10 to 15. The school is accredited by the Northwest Association of Accredited Schools. It is a member of the National Association of Therapeutic Schools and Programs (NATSAP).

In recent years, New Leaf Academy and its former North Carolina location have faced allegations of corporate misconduct and abuse of power. In addition, former students have come forward with allegations of physical and emotional abuse at the hands of employees.

== History ==
New Leaf Academy of Oregon was founded in 1997 by Craig and Christy Christiansen. In 2004, it was acquired by Aspen Education Group, which operated the school until 2011. In March 2011, Aspen announced that it was restructuring and would close New Leaf Academy of Oregon as well as other schools and programs. In June 2011, it was announced that the school's original owners, Craig and Christy Christiansen, were acquiring the school from Aspen and assuming responsibility for its continuing operation.

=== North Carolina campus ===
A Hendersonville, North Carolina campus of New Leaf Academy was established in 2005 and operated until June 2010. Aspen announced that The Talisman School would open on its campus in August 2010 to enroll youth with Asperger's and other autism spectrum disorders. New Leaf's North Carolina director, Cat Jennings, planned to become head of Lake House Academy. Twenty-seven students remaining at New Leaf were to be sent to New Leaf in Oregon and to Aspen's Bromley Brook School in Vermont. In March 2011, Aspen announced that it was restructuring and would close New Leaf Academy in Oregon as well as Bromley Brook School in Vermont and other programs.
