= NorthStar Center =

Coordinates: 44.0615°N 121.3119°W

NorthStar Center was a young adult therapeutic transition and relapse prevention program, located in Bend, Oregon, owned and operated by Aspen Education Group for young adults ages 17 1/2 to 24 for treatment of substance abuse and addiction. In March 2011, Aspen announced that it would cease program operations in August 2011 as part of a restructuring of the company.

The therapeutic basis of the program was dialectical behavioral therapy, a type of psychotherapy developed by Marsha M. Linehan and consisting of four parts: mindfulness, interpersonal effectiveness, emotion regulation, and distress tolerance. Additional therapies included transtheoreticalstages of change theory, motivational interviewing and the 12 step programs Alcoholics Anonymous and Narcotics Anonymous.

Academic offerings included high school completion, college preparatory and college-level courses. Program participants could take classes at Central Oregon Community College, located nearby.

NorthStar was established in 1991 by Dennis and Jeannie Crowell. Dennis Crowell had earlier led Mount Bachelor Academy in Bend. NorthStar operated independently until 1998, when it was acquired by the Aspen Education Group. In March 2011, Aspen announced plans to close the facility in August 2011. As of the closure announcement, NorthStar had about 40 full- and part-time employees.

Along with Passages to Recovery, an Aspen wilderness therapy program, NorthStar was featured on the July 30, 2006, episode of A&E Television Network's documentary series Intervention.
