= Wellspring Academies =

Defunct therapeutic boarding school in the United States

Coordinates: 36°34′10″N 119°28′35″W

Wellspring Academies (formerly Academy of the Sierras) was a pair of therapeutic boarding schools for overweight and obese children, teens, and young adults, both operated by Wellspring, a division of Aspen Education Group. It is said to be the first weight loss boarding school in the United States.

As of September 2009 Wellspring Academies had two campuses.

- The California campus is in Reedley, California, about 30 minutes southeast of Fresno, and has 90 students ages 13–24 (grades 8–12, as well as a college-age program run in conjunction with Reedley College).
- A second campus, located in Brevard, North Carolina and known as Wellspring Academy of the Carolinas (or WSCL), has roughly 30 students ages 11–18 (grades 6–11).

== History ==
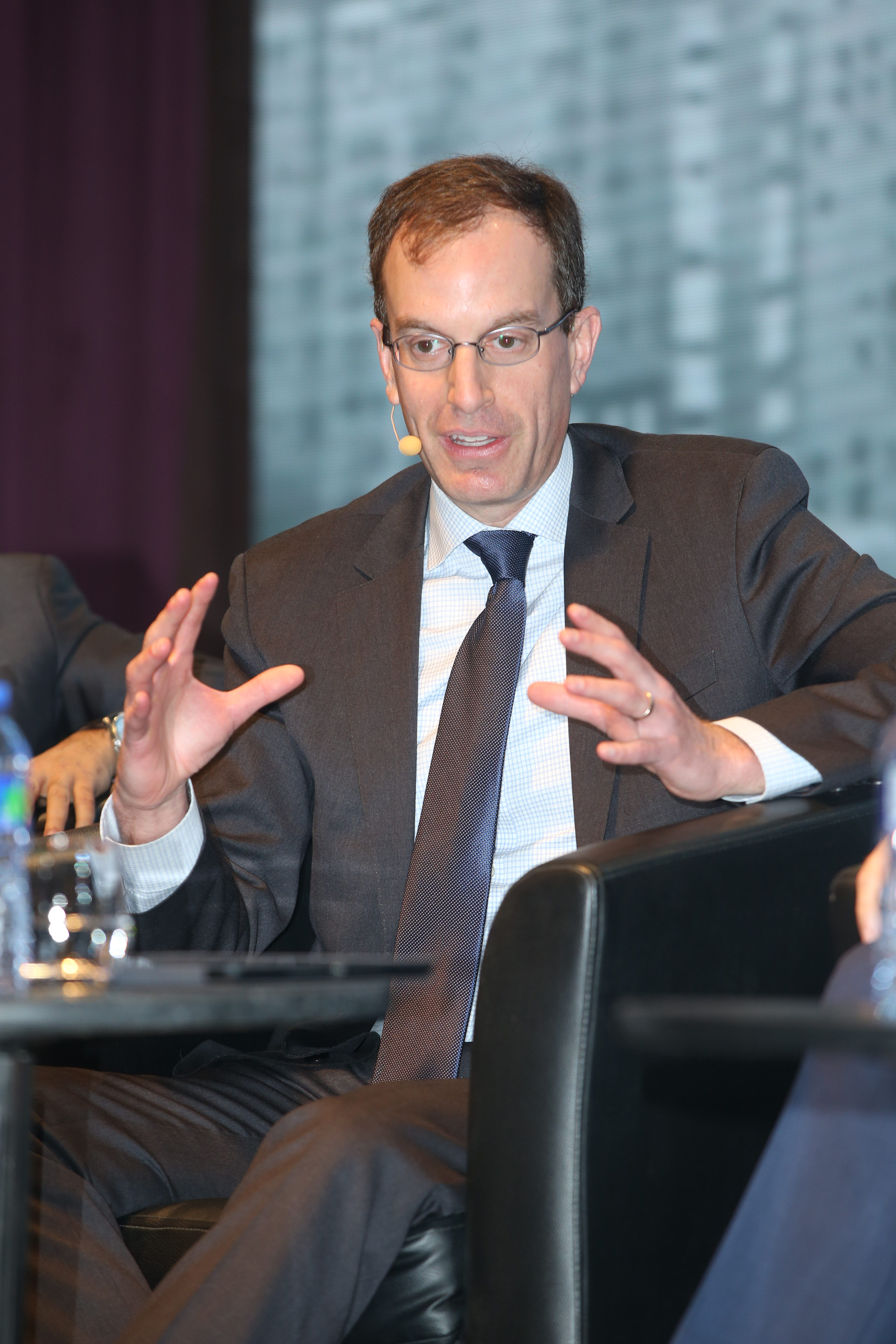
Ryan D. Craig in 2017

The Academy of the Sierras was founded in California 2004 by Ryan Craig, who also served as the school's first executive director. Aspen invested $6.5 million in the start-up. The school's second location in North Carolina was established in 2007.

== Methods ==
Wellspring's focus was on living a healthy lifestyle, with long-term success of its participants presented at international scientific conferences on obesity. Wellspring claimed that its program, founded on decades of scientific research in obesity, had among "the best documented outcomes of any non-surgical weight loss intervention for any age group.".

Admissions were ongoing throughout the year, with a minimum 4-month stay. Incoming students for the fall semester had the option to participate in a multi-week wilderness program conducted in a location near the campus.

Wellspring Academies utilized an integrated approach to fitness and weight loss. Once in the regular program, participants learned diet and activity management, with culinary, nutrition, fitness and aerobic training to enable participants to learn lifelong skills. Students ate three low-fat meals and two snacks daily, totaling only about 1,300 calories and less than 12 grams of fat per day. Extensive daily physical activity, including walking or running at least 10,000 steps per day, was also required. Behavioral changes were reinforced with cognitive behavioral therapy, training students on the self-regulatory behaviors required for long-term weight control. This included use of a Self-Monitoring Journal to record everything a student eats throughout the day. According to weight-loss researchers, the self-monitoring technique was a key component of long-term weight loss success. In addition, students met with a "behavioral coach" three times per week to reinforce the training, improve frustration tolerance and stress management skills, and work through the issues that are typically contributing to the weight gain, like emotional eating or resorting to food as an unhealthy coping mechanism. Cognitive Behavioral Therapy (CBT) was central to the Wellspring program as it had been shown in numerous studies to reinforce key self-regulatory skills (such as self-monitoring) and had favorable short and long-term effects on weight loss

== Academics ==
Students continued their education while they worked to lose weight. Wellspring Academy of California, with an academic curriculum accredited by the Western Association of Schools and Colleges, included grades 8 – 12, with a college program available through an affiliation with Reedley College. Wellspring Academy of the Carolinas offered an academic program accredited by Southern Association of Colleges and Schools for grades 7 – 12.

Curriculum at both Academies included core classes such as English, math, history, and science, as well as fitness, nutrition, and culinary courses that reinforce skills for weight loss. Electives such as foreign languages, theater, and horticulture were also available and varied by Academy and semester.

== Outcomes ==
Wellspring Academies claimed that students lost more than 3 pounds (1.4 kg) per week and maintained this weight loss, on average.

Some experts, such as Anjali Jain, a pediatrician at Children's National Medical Center, questioned the expense and necessity of boarding school, pointing out that participants had not been followed long enough after leaving the program to evaluate the long-term results.

Recent long-term results were presented at The Obesity Society 2008 Annual Meeting.

== Related programs ==
Wellspring also offered Wellspring camps for summer weight loss in locations which included New York, North Carolina, Florida, California, Texas, Pennsylvania, Wisconsin, Hawaii, Vancouver, Canada, and England. and after-school programs for fitness and weight loss

== Closure ==
All Wellspring Academy campuses along with all Weight Loss Camps in the U.S., Canada and the UK closed permanently in January 2014 due to the economic downturn, the lack of insurance coverage availability and the inability of families to pay for the treatment program.

In 2015 one for the former directors of the California facility opened up a similar program in Arizona for girls only entitled Gem Academy. Plans are in the works to develop an equivalent boys-only academy as soon as space, funding and staffing can be secured.
