= Bromley Brook School =

All girls single-sex school in Manchester Center, Vermont, United States

Coordinates: 43.180951°N 73.011349°W

Location
- 2595 Depot St; Manchester Center, Vermont 05255; USA

Information
- Type: All girls single-sex school
- Motto: "Come experience the grace and power of Bromley Brook Girls"
- Established: 2004
- Founder: Aspen Education Group
- Closed: 2011
- Grades: 7-12
- Enrollment: 50
- Mascot: The Bandits
- Accreditation: National Association of Therapeutic Schools and Programs
- Student:Teacher ratio: 12:1
- Website: http://www.bromleybrookschool.com

Bromley Brook School was a therapeutic boarding school in Manchester Center, Vermont, for teenage girls who were not functioning well at traditional schools. The school was owned and operated by the Aspen Education Group. Bromley Brook was mentioned in The New York Times. In March 2011, Aspen announced that the school would close at the end of the 2010–2011 academic year.

== History ==
Bromley Brook School was established in 2004. Enrollment averaged about 80 students.

In December 2009, a male staff member was charged with the sexual exploitation of two female students. He pled guilty in April 2010.

In March 2011, Aspen Education Group announced that the school would close at the end of the 2010–2011 academic year as part of a restructuring of Aspen's operations. At the time of the announcement, there were 57 students enrolled and about 45 employees.
