= Sedona Sky Academy =

Coordinates: 34°37′35″N 111°47′49″W

Location
- 3090 E. Coronado Trail; Rimrock, Arizona 86335; United States

Information
- School type: Therapeutic boarding school
- Established: 2014; 11 years ago
- CEEB code: 030373
- Grades: 7–12
- Accreditation: AdvancEd
- Website: www.sedonasky.org

Sedona Sky Academy is a private therapeutic boarding school for adolescent girls, in Lake Montezuma, Arizona, United States. Sedona Sky Academy is located on the previous site of Copper Canyon Academy, which was established by Tammy Behrmann and her brother Darren Prince in 1998. They sold it to Aspen Education Group in 2002. In 2006, Aspen was acquired by CRC Health Group, Inc.

Behrmann and Prince continued to work for CRC Health (at the facility) for two years after they sold the school, leaving in 2008 to start a different residential treatment center in southern Utah. In 2008, Paul Taylor assumed the Executive Director position. The Academy continued operations as a subsidiary of CRC Health Group and Aspen until 2014. Subsequently, Copper Canyon Academy closed on April 7, 2014.

Sedona Sky Academy acquired a business license on April 7, 2014. Tammy Behrmann and Darren Prince, in association with Family Help & Wellness, opened Sedona Sky Academy on April 23, 2014, under the legal business name of Lake Montezuma RTC, LLC.
