= Anneewakee Treatment Center for Emotionally Disturbed Youth =

Adolescent treatment center in Georgia, US

Coordinates: 33°40′48″N 84°43′49″W

https://kidsoverprofits.org/facility/youth-villages-inner-harbour-campus-ga/

The Anneewakee Treatment Center was a Douglasville, Georgia, United States, based adolescent treatment center which changed name to the New Annewakee, Inner Harbour Hospital and now Inner Harbour, Ltd (DBA) Inner Harbour for Children and Families, after a major lawsuit by 110 former "patients" for $432 million in 1990, represented by attorneys B. Randall Blackwood and Patricia Edelkind. There was physical and sexual abuse, exploitation of child labor, and deprivation of education from its inception in the early 1960s through to the mid-1980s.

== History ==
Opening in 1962, the center was a wilderness treatment center for troubled boys. Anneewakee expanded from the single Douglasville, Georgia, center to include a boys campus near Carrabelle, Florida. and a girls campus near Rockmart, Georgia. The north campus in Rockmart, Georgia, is no longer a girls' campus but a shared campus. One unit, which is a locked unit, consists of two separate programs aimed at youths with sexual trauma and youths who have committed sexual acts deemed inappropriate in other programs and homes. The second is an extreme bootcamp/outdoors group in which youths who are on the cusp of becoming adult criminals are placed, having committed adult crimes. This is a program that seeks to give the youth one last chance to comply with societal norms while receiving treatment.

Scandals emerged in the 1980s with a decades-long history of forced child labor, sexual abuse, physical abuse, and deprivation of education. Survivors of this center today range from people who say it saved their lives, to people who refer to it as the Chernobyl of treatment centers. On February 19, 1987, Thomas Grimland was arrested by Georgia Bureau of Investigation and Florida Department of Law Enforcement as part of the investigation into patient abuse at Anneewakee. Louis J. Poetter entered a guilty on 18 charges of sodomizing patients in 1988 and was sentenced 20 years in prison.

In 2015, one of the former patients at the facility wrote a book about his time there. It is Anneewakee: One Boy's Journey, by Steve Salem Evans. Mr. Evans' experience is described as mixed. In 2020, another book was written, titled Land of the Friendly People, by Rob Shulman. Shulman describes witnessing many kinds of abuse and suffering from some of them personally. A complete index documenting the events at Anneewakee are appended.

== Modern history ==
Anneewakee was acquired and is now operated as Inner Harbour Ltd or DBA Inner Harbour for Children & Families. After the scandals, the court awarded the management of the organization to Hospital Corporation of America (HCA) out of Nashville, Tennessee. A medical model was instituted where care is supervised by medical doctors/psychiatrists.

Up until 2001, the average stay for a person in the facility could range from ages 5 to adulthood (age 21), giving the center roughly 16 years of a youth's life. Those times were changed in 2001 when the restructuring of treatment methods began. Now the average stay for a youth is 30 to 90 days. The Douglasville campus is the main campus and offers unisex housing for girls and boys. The locked unit is composed of four separate units. Each unit is purportedly named after an Indian tribe such as Abidiban, Itanka, Kinunka, and Tawanka. The locked unit has a level system of red, green, yellow, and blue, with each level granting certain privileges and demanding more participation with on-site therapists. Each therapist writes what are called BIRP notes, which are used by mental health professionals to track a patient's progress. After a patient has finished the color level system, they are moved from the locked unit to a campsite. Each camp is categorized by age and sex: Itanka being the teen boys camp, Kinunka being the young girls camp, Tawanka being the teen girls camp, and Abidiban being the older boys camp.
