= Aspen Achievement Academy =

Wilderness therapy program in Utah, U.S.

Aspen Achievement Academy was a wilderness therapy program for adolescents, based in Loa, Utah, and operated as a part of Aspen Education Group.

According to the program's promotional materials, Aspen Achievement Academy enrolled adolescent males and females, ages 13–17, with a history of moderate to severe emotional and behavioral problems, such as low self-esteem, academic underachievement, substance abuse, and family conflict. The program had a flexible length of stay, with a minimum of 35 days. Some parents used a teen escort company to transport their children to the site.

The program's website stated that the program was JCAHO certified and licensed as an Outdoor Treatment Program by the Utah Department of Human Services. It had memberships in the National Association of Therapeutic Schools and Programs and the Outdoor Behavioral Healthcare Industry Council.

== In news media and popular culture ==
Aspen Achievement Academy has been a subject of several media reports and works of popular culture:

- The 1999 book Shouting at the Sky: Troubled Teens and the Promise of the Wild by Gary Ferguson, recounts the author's experiences and observations during the several months he spent in the wilderness with teens at Aspen Achievement Academy.
- The third season of the UK TV series Brat Camp was filmed at Aspen Achievement Academy, and aired in the UK beginning in February 2006.

== History ==
Aspen Achievement Academy was founded in 1988 by Doug Nelson, Dr. Keith Hooker, Doug Cloward, and Madolyn Liebing, Ph.D. It was originally named The Wilderness Academy in the town of Bicknell Utah. Aspen is known for being the first wilderness therapy programs to have a licensed clinician (Liebing) who provided individual therapy, and for being the first Utah State licensed wilderness therapy program.

In January 1996, six teenagers ran away from an Aspen group. They were found by law enforcement officials and returned to the program, but the incident raised concerns that future escapees might assault tourists, hikers or recreationists on the public lands that Aspen used. Afterward, the Bureau of Land Management, which manages the lands, was reported to have conducted a review to determine whether to renew or terminate Aspen's access permit.

In April 2007 a 16-year-old male student died after hanging himself with a piece of seatbelt webbing.

In March 2011, the program closed and merged with another wilderness therapy program in Utah - Outback Therapeutic Expeditions.
