= Wellspring =

Wellspring may refer to:

- A source of water, a spring or well
- Wellspring Capital Management, a $2 billion private equity firm based in New York City
- Wellspring Academies, therapeutic schools for overweight and obese youngsters
- Wellspring Retreat and Resource Center, a counseling center specializing in the treatment of former members of abusive religious groups and cults
- The Wellspring, an American folk rock duo
