= Excel Academy =

Excel Academy is the name of several different schools, including:

- Excel Academy (Arvada, Colorado), a charter school in Arvada, Colorado
- Excel Academy at Francis M. Wood High School, Baltimore, Maryland
- Excel Academy (Conroe, Texas), a boarding school in Conroe, Texas
- Excel Academy (San Antonio, Texas), a public school in San Antonio, Texas, operated by the Northside hool District
- Excel Academy (Stoke-on-Trent), a secondary school in Staffordshire, England
