= Academy at Swift River =

Coordinates: 42°28′52″N 72°53′3″W

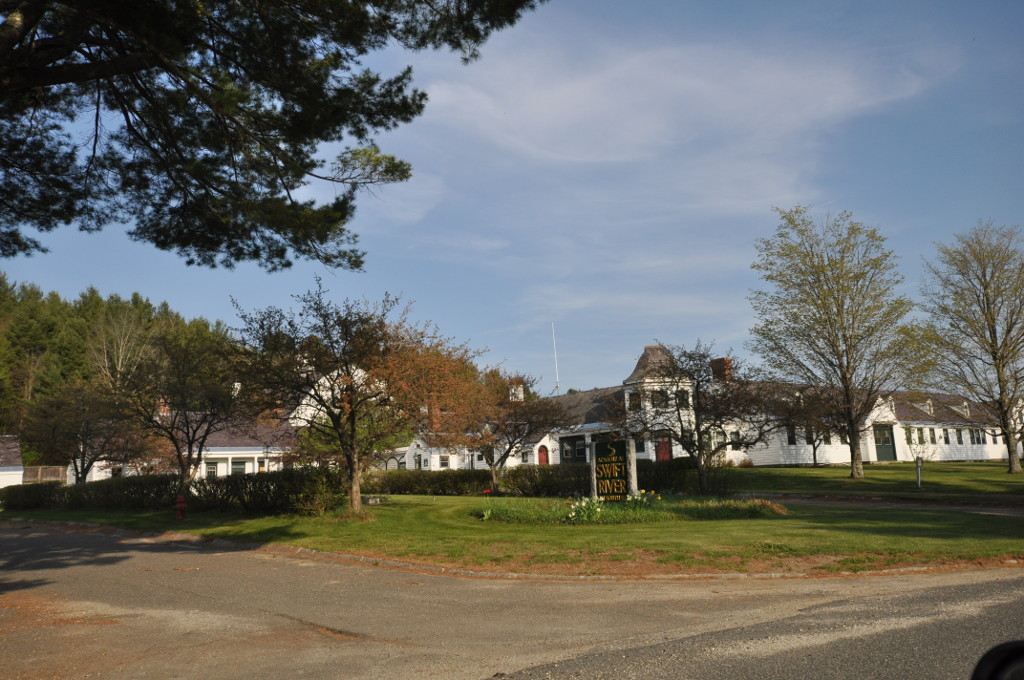
- Academy at Swift River in 2016

Location
- 151 South St; Cummington, Hampshire, Massachusetts 01026; United States

Information
- School type: Therapeutic boarding school
- Established: 1997
- Founder: Tim Brace
- Closed: 2013
- Headmaster: Rudy Bentz
- Age range: 14 to 18
- Enrollment: 65
- Tuition: $5000 (2005)

The Academy at Swift River, also known as ASR, was a coeducational therapeutic boarding school for teenagers, located in Plainfield and Cummington, Massachusetts. Established in 1997 and closed in 2013, it was a part of the Aspen Education Group, which in turn is owned by Bain Capital's CRC health group.

The school's student population was described as "bright but underachieving kids" with a variety of behavioral problems. The majority of students used prescribed psychiatric medications. ASR was in session year-round and offered a college preparatory curriculum for high school grades 9 to 12. Total enrollment was about 55 students.

The school was the focus of the 2005 book What It Takes To Pull Me Through: Why Teenagers Get in Trouble and How Four of Them Got Out by journalist David Marcus.

== History ==
In July 2013, Aspen Education Group announced that it would close the school later that summer.
