= Oakley School =

Therapeutic boarding school in Oakley, Summit County, Utah, United States

Coordinates: 40°43′11″N 111°17′07″W

Location
- 251 W Weber Canyon Rd; Oakley, Summit County, Utah 84061; United States

Information
- Established: 1998
- Status: Closed
- Closed: 2017
- Category: Therapeutic Boarding School
- CEEB code: 450242

Oakley School

Oakley School was a coeducational therapeutic boarding school located in Oakley, Utah, enrolling students of high school age. The school announced its closure in May 2017. The school was established in 1998 as a transitional placement for students who had been released from the Island View Residential Treatment Center. In 2004 both Oakley and Island View were acquired by Aspen Education Group. Since August 2013, it has been partnered with InnerChange, LLC.

A former student featured the since-closed Oakley School in the documentary Now Return Us to Normal. In it, the filmmaker Leslie Koren and her classmates described their experiences during their years at the behavior modification school. Koren and others described treatment strategies included isolating students upon arrival, controlling who they could talk to and in what settings, taking away certain privileges, and therapy designed to psychologically break students.

In 2021, Newport Academy, a nationwide network of residential treatment centers for teens struggling with mental health issues, opened a facility on the former campus of the Oakley School. The executive director of the Newport Academy teen residential treatment program in Oakley is Gary Broadbent, who also worked as a therapist at the Oakley School and Island View Residential Treatment Center in Syracuse, Utah.

== Notable alumni ==
- Chet Hanks
