= Still Creek Ranch =

Location
- 6055 Hearne Rd; Bryan, Texas; United States; 30°46′57″N 96°13′3″W

Information
- Type: Private/Christian; Therapeutic Boarding School
- Established: 1988
- Headmaster: James Inmon
- Grades: K–12
- Enrollment: 75 (2012)
- Language: English
- Mascot: Colt
- Website: Still Creek Ranch

Still Creek is an accredited Christian school and horse ranch located in unincorporated Brazos County, Texas, 15 miles (24 km) from Bryan, on approximately 200 acres (81 ha) of land. Danny and Margaret O'Quinn operated the school from 1988 to 2012, and Steve and Tracy Singleton served as executive directors from 2012 to 2014. Tim Floyd was named the new executive director in March 2015. Beginning in 2017, James Inmon is the director after serving as principal since 2015.

Still Creek is a therapeutic boarding school that serves neglected and abused children, ages 8–18, from all over The United States by providing a structured, Christian environment in which to live and study. In addition to the academic curriculum, Still Creek offers a variety of vocational training such as welding, agriculture, wood shop, and horsemanship classes. Still Creek students learn to ride horses five days a week. Still Creek Ranch believes that horses are naturally therapeutic and that children heal naturally on horseback and by caring for them.

== Mission and support ==
The Ranch's mission is to provide for the spiritual, physical, emotional, and academic needs of the residents and students. The Ranch is a non-profit organization that operates on donations from individuals, businesses, corporations, foundations, civic groups, and churches. Donations go toward general operating expenses, including groceries, utilities, and salaries for the staff members. The Ranch relies heavily on three annual fundraisers.

Members of the community as well as students from nearby Texas A&M University volunteer their time helping at the Ranch.

== History ==
Prior to the coming of the O'Quinns, the land on which Still Creek was built was a children's residential treatment center run by The Answer. When starting the school, Still Creek Ranch leased 14 acres of land that had one school building which had been an old barracks, one building that housed the children, and an old barn. In the first three years, the school served 14 students.

With the assistance of staff member Ken Klein, Still Creek shifted its focus away from residential treatment to being a boarding school for underprivileged children. The mission changed to providing a home for children abandoned by their parents. The home's goal was to provide children with structure, discipline, and education in order to become independent adults.

Initially, Still Creek served only boys. However, an unidentified benefactor donated 20 acres on the condition that a girls’ home be built on the Ranch. In three years, a girls' home had been built with the help of the Jensen Foundation of Dallas, Texas. Later, the landlord who leased the original 14 acres deeded her entire 100 acres to the Ranch.

When the need arrived to build a school building, a four-acre lot next to the Ranch came up for sale and a donation was given from a donor in Bryan, Texas that was equal to the sales price. When the foundations to the school were poured, Bibles were placed in each corner. The school was built slowly as donations came in. Volunteers, staff and the boys on the Ranch helped build a mechanic's shop, a welding shop, a wood shop and horse barns. Every vehicle, piece of furniture, and other furnishings were donated.

Later, a donor bought and gave 33 acres of land a quarter mile from Still Creek Ranch and built a covered horse arena with numerous horse stalls, a kitchen, and bathrooms.

In May 2012, Steve and Tracy Singleton took over management at Still Creek while the O'Quinns retired to New Mexico to start a summer camp for abused children. The Singletons were former directors of Happy Hill Farm Academy in Granbury, Texas.

In 2013, Still Creek launched Restore Her, a ministry specifically focused on the restoration of minor girls who had either been trafficked or who had been exposed to the commercial sex industry. In 2014, a third girls' house was completed.

In March 2015, Tim Floyd was named the new executive director of Still Creek Ranch. He and his wife Lori previously served as house parents at the New Mexico Baptist Children's Home. Prior to that, Tim served as the program director for Open Door Ministries in Denver, Colorado.

In 2017, James Inmon became the executive director of the ranch and headmaster of the school. Inmon had been principal of the school since 2015. The new director brought experience from youth ministry, agriculture business, and education. Inmon graduated Texas A&M in 1999 and obtained a master's degree and Principal Certification from Stephen F. Austin State University in 2015.

Many miracles in the lives of children have been witnessed at Still Creek Ranch. Thousands of children have been part of the effort to take children from crisis to new creation. Still Creek is still debt free, only funded by private donations, and gives boarding and education freely to children from the gifts provided to the ranch. Safe homes, the Gospel, a great education, and work ethic through life on the ranch are available to children from crisis (such as abuse, neglect, abandonment).

In early 2025, Still Creek Ranch, came under scrutiny as a house parent as well as a teacher at the school were arrested by the Brazos Sheriff's department for inappropriate sexual conduct with children.

== Accreditation and facilities ==
Still Creek Ranch is accredited by Cognia and has been accredited since 1991. The school is interdenominational and not affiliated with any particular church.

The ranch has three homes for boys and three homes for girls, a school, staff housing, various shops, and a roofed arena for riding and horse shows. Covering 88,000 square feet (8,200 m^{2}), the arena is among the largest in the region. The school also has a computer lab, science lab, weight room, and gymnasium.
