= Élan School =

Private therapeutic boarding school in Poland, Maine, United States

Location
- Poland, Maine 04274; United States; 44.008°N 70.386°W

Information
- Type: Private therapeutic boarding school
- Opened: 1970
- Closed: April 1, 2011
- Grades: 8–12
- Age range: 13–18+
- Affiliations: NATSAP
- Website: elanschool.com at the Wayback Machine (archive index)

Élan School was an abusive behavior modification program and therapeutic boarding school located in Poland, Maine. It was a full member of the National Association of Therapeutic Schools and Programs (NATSAP) and was considered to be a part of the troubled teen industry. The facility closed down on April 1, 2011, following multiple reports of abuse, many from former students, dating back to its opening in 1970.

The Élan School was located on a 33-acre (13 ha) campus in south Poland that was formerly a hunting lodge. There were also other campuses, such as the one on 424 Maplecrest Road in Parsonsfield, which was formerly a hotel and hospital before it was bought by Élan in 1975. This campus was known to have some of the worst abuse in the school's history, and was put out of use sometime in the 1980s.

The Élan School acquired notoriety during the 1990s and early-2000s when former classmates of Michael Skakel, who had attended in the 1970s, testified against him in his trial for a murder that had occurred about two years before he had enrolled. The school was also the subject of persistent allegations of abuse in its behavioral modification program.

== History ==
Élan School was founded in 1970 by Joseph Ricci, a former heroin addict who had worked with young people in drug treatment facilities, along with psychiatrist Dr. Gerald Davidson and investor David Goldberg. Ricci headed the school until his death on January 29, 2001, due to lung cancer, when his widow Sharon Terry took over. In 1974, Élan 1 was damaged by a fire with damages estimated as $100,000. Maine politician Bill Diamond served as the school's Director of Governmental Relations.

In 1975, Illinois state officials removed eleven children from the Élan program, alleging mistreatment. In the late-1970s, Androscoggin County Sheriff's Office Lieutenant Max Ashburn visited the school after repeatedly hearing rumors of abuse, but the staff did not allow him entry into the school past the lobby. Following this, he began keeping a file in which he documented names and phone numbers related to Élan, as well as reported abuses.

In 1979, Lieutenant Ashburn was called by a local family to pick up a 16-year-old Élan runaway. The boy had been a student at Élan for several months, and said that his parents lived in another state. Ashburn recalled in 2016 that the boy "was crying, and he was begging me not to take him back"; rather than return him to the school, Ashburn, a former truck driver himself, took the boy to a local diner, and instructed him to hitch a ride with one of the truck drivers there.

Élan was featured in Children of Darkness, a documentary film shot in 1983 that explored the experiences of emotionally troubled youth and the various residences and institutions that housed them.

In July 1990, 15-year-old runaway Brad Glickman of Bedford, New York, visited the home of Todd and Audrey Blaylock in Norway, Maine, after meeting one of Audrey Blaylock's daughters. Glickman told those he met that his name was "David Smith". Roy O'Hara, a resident at the house, was handling a revolver when it discharged, fatally shooting Glickman in the heart. O'Hara was found guilty of manslaughter that November; however, the verdict would be partially overturned in 1993.

On March 21, 1993, 17-year-old student Dawn Marie Birnbaum ran away from Élan during a school outing. On March 24, she was found dead in a snowbank near Interstate 80 having been raped and murdered by a trucker while hitchhiking back home. 36-year-old James Robert Cruz Jr. was charged with the first-degree murder of Birnbaum, and sentenced to life in prison.

=== Closure ===
On March 23, 2011, the Élan School announced it would be closing on April 1, 2011. The school's owner, Sharon Terry, blamed "declining enrollment and resulting financial difficulties," as well as negative attacks on the school via the internet. In a letter to the Lewiston Sun-Journal, Terry said: "The school has been the target of harsh and false attacks spread over Reddit and the internet with the avowed purpose of forcing the school to be closed."

=== Post-closure ===
In March 2016, Maine State Police announced they had opened a cold case investigation into the death of 15-year-old Élan student Phil Williams, who died on December 27, 1982, after participating in Élan's boxing ring, where students were forced to fight each other as a means of behavior modification. Williams had been punished for talking back to staff and was beaten so badly that he died of a brain aneurysm. The State Police later announced no charges would be filed as a result of their investigation, citing insufficient evidence.

A documentary chronicling the school's history and impact titled The Last Stop was released in 2017. The film was directed by an Élan graduate and included interviews from various residents, graduates, and professionals including Maia Szalavitz.

On November 17, 2024, a fire destroyed a building on the property of the former Élan School. In March 2025, two more fires destroyed another two buildings on the property. In May 2025, two 18-year-old male suspects were arrested and they were charged for the three fires at Élan and as well as two more fires in Yarmouth. Investigators also determined that two 17-year-olds were also involved in the fires but they have not yet been charged with the incident.

== Program ==
In the school's controversial program, humiliation was identified as a therapeutic tool, as was following up on such intervention with encouragement and warm support. Students attended year-round. The school's treatment methods were based on the "therapeutic community" or TC modality popularized in the 1960s at facilities such as Synanon, and later at Daytop Village.

In 2002, a New Jersey educational consultant who had referred students to Élan for twenty-two years told The New York Times that he would refer only "the most serious cases" to the school, which he said would "take kids who haven't responded to other programs and who are really out of control" and that the school was "certainly not for the faint-hearted." He said "There's lots of confrontation, ... and yet there are lots of hugs." Accounts of former students include mentions of physical and mental abuse, including degrading tasks such as "[sessions] of cleaning urinals with a toothbrush that can last for hours" and up to the point of critical malnourishment.

=== "The Ring" ===
A 2000 investigation by The New Yorker characterized "the ring" as an abusive practice in which students were compelled to fight one another, sometimes against multiple opponents in succession.

A later investigation in 2011 by Time provided a detailed account of a similar event, describing a circle formed by students and staff in which one participant was designated to represent the school and another identified as having violated school rules. According to Time, spectators were expected to participate by jeering or physically striking the designated student, and additional opponents were introduced in successive rounds until the student conceded. The report stated that participants often sustained visible injuries and noted that similar events were conducted for girls.

== Controversies ==
Throughout its history, the Élan School was faced with numerous allegations of student maltreatment. In 2001, Details magazine cited Élan as "among the most controversial of the nation's residential therapeutic communities."

The New York State Education Department, which had paid tuition for special education students to attend Élan School, gave the school a favorable review in 2005. In 2007, however, New York education officials raised questions about the school's practices, alleging in a letter to the school and Maine education officials that Élan students were physically restraining their peers and being deprived of sleep. The allegations prompted the State of New York to threaten to withdraw tuition money for taxpayer-funded students. The school's lawyer contested the allegations.

=== Skakel and Moxley case ===
On the evening of October 30, 1975, in Greenwich, Connecticut, 15-year-old Martha Moxley went with friends to participate in "mischief night", in which they commit mischief like ringing doorbells and pulling pranks such as toilet papering houses. According to friends, Moxley began flirting with, and eventually kissed, Thomas Skakel, the older brother of 15-year-old Michael Skakel. Moxley was last seen "falling together behind the fence" with Thomas, near the pool in the Skakel backyard, at around 9:30 pm.

The next day, Moxley's corpse was found beneath a tree in her family's backyard. Her pants and underwear were pulled down, but she had not been sexually assaulted. Pieces of a broken golf club, later traced to the Skakel residence, were found near the body. An autopsy indicated that she had been both bludgeoned and stabbed with the club.

Michael Skakel's trial began on May 7, 2002, in Norwalk. Two former students from Élan, where Skakel received treatment for alcoholism, testified they heard Skakel confess to killing Moxley with a golf club. One of the former students, Gregory Coleman, testified that Skakel was given special privileges and had bragged, "I'm going to get away with murder. I'm a Kennedy."

Furthermore, witnesses testified that beatings and public humiliation were a part of life at Élan during the late-1970s. In trial testimony, former students described the practice of placing a student in a "boxing ring" who was then surrounded by classmates who confronted the student. As Skakel refused to confess when staff demanded it, he was placed in the boxing ring and beaten by other students who took turns; afterwards he was spanked and after six or eight hours is when he said maybe he had killed Martha Moxley. On June 7, 2002, Skakel was found guilty of murdering Moxley and was sentenced to 20 years to life in prison.

=== Deaths related to Élan ===
After decades of struggling with mental illness, 49-year-old Tiffany Joyce Sedaris died by suicide on May 24, 2013. Sedaris was the sister of Amy Sedaris and David Sedaris. Tiffany's two years at Élan were cited in her siblings' writings and interviews as deeply traumatic to her, and a direct cause of her inability to form normal relationships with her family members and other people.

== Runaways ==
Students would occasionally run away from Élan. Former Androscoggin County Sheriff's Office Captain Ray Lafrance stated that Élan would send groups in vans to search for and return runaways, and noted that the school only called police to report missing students as a last resort. Lafrance said some runaways would be relieved to be found after spending nights in the woods, though others "were scared to death to go back to Élan. If we really felt they were really scared, we'd bring them into the department, call their parents and at least let them know what's going on. Then we'd call Élan and they'd come pick them up."

== In media ==
The school was covered by The Last Podcast on the Left in a three-part special.

Élan is the main location for the events in Joe versus Elan School, a web-based graphic novel which documents the abuses inflicted upon the author by Élan and his recovery process.

== See also ==
- Attack therapy
- CEDU
- Daytop
- Judge Rotenberg Educational Center
- Large-group awareness training
