= Sorenson's Ranch School =

Location
- 410 North 100 East; Koosharem, Utah, United States; Sevier County 84744; 38°31′03″N 111°52′42″W

Information
- School type: residential treatment center
- Religious affiliation: Nonsectarian
- Denomination: Nondenominational
- Established: 1959
- Founder: Burnell Sorenson
- NCES District ID: 43
- NCES School ID: A9106562
- Director: Shane Sorenson
- Teaching staff: 7
- Age range: 12 - 19
  - Grade 6: 1
  - Grade 7: 4
  - Grade 8: 8
  - Grade 9: 23
  - Grade 10: 25
  - Grade 11: 7
  - Grade 12: 11
- Student to teacher ratio: 11.3
- Hours in school day: 6.7
- Colors: Green and White
- Mascot: Mustang
- Accreditation: Accredited
- Website: http://www.sorensonsranch.com

Sorenson's Ranch School is a ranch school for struggling youth. Sorenson's Ranch School is located in Koosharem, Utah. Sorenson's Ranch School is a licensed residential treatment center in the State of Utah. Sorenson's Ranch School is accredited through the Northwest Accreditation Commission.

Founded in 1959 initially as a summer camp, the institution underwent a transformative shift in 1982, transitioning seamlessly into a year-round educational facility, thereby broadening its scope and mission.

== Sports program ==
Sorenson's Ranch School offers a sports program. Students participate in sports with surrounding schools in sports such as basketball, and wrestling. The Sorenson's Ranch School Mustangs Football Team also competes with surrounding schools.

== School Information ==
Sorenson's Ranch School is accredited through The Northwest Accreditation Commission Sorenson's Ranch is also registered with the National Association of Therapeutic Schools and Programs Sorenson's Ranch School is registered with The Joint Commission on Accreditation of Health Care Organizations (JCAHO). The Joint Commission typically is a certification for hospitals; however, the Joint Commission provides accreditation, including deemed status accreditation for several other types of health care organizations in addition to hospitals

== Legal issues and abuse ==
Shaun Sorenson, son of Burnell Sorenson, was the subject of a lawsuit originated by the Utah Department of Health and Human Services due to his employment at the ranch despite his status as a convicted felon in the state of California. The court ruled that he could in fact remain employed at the school as the law only applied to instructors, and he was not an instructor.

In 2006, the school filed suit against MySpace because of past attendees who were labeling themselves "survivors" and alleging that the Sorensons engaged in child abuse, employed underqualified staff, and engaged in false advertising. When the MySpace pages were taken down, they withdrew the suit.

In October 2007, two seventeen-year-old boys attempted to run away from Sorenson's Ranch School. They were reported to Sevier County sheriff's department.

In 2021 the State of Utah took the unusual step of threatening to revoke the license of the school for failing to close a facility known as "Mountain Camp" two years after regulators had ordered them to close it. Mountain Camp employed forced labor as punishment for misbehavior, forcing residents to shovel manure, chop wood, pick up rocks, or simply walk without stopping for hours. Such punishment is considered "disproportionate consequence for negative behaviors” under Utah law. The state's statement on the matter went on to state that the school had failed to report at least a dozen "critical incidents" as required by law, and that staff abused and threatened students.

The Notice of Agency Action (NAA) dated March 23, 2021, noted a total of fourteen violations of Utah Administrative Rules. A review of Sorenson's internal reports and employee files shows at least six instances within the past three years of criminal activity such as assault and/or threats where there is no documentation to show that these incidents were reported to law enforcement or applicable investigative agencies as required by office rules and state statute. Furthermore, a staff interview revealed that the program did not allow staff members to directly report to applicable investigative agencies. Finally, a review of internal incident reports, employee files and client interviews documented numerous incidents of mistreatment. In addition to the mistreatment described in the other violations listed in the NAA, 8 of 14 clients interviewed reported staff mistreatment in the form of verbal mistreatment and threatening statements.
