= Synanon =

1958 California drug rehab program turned cult

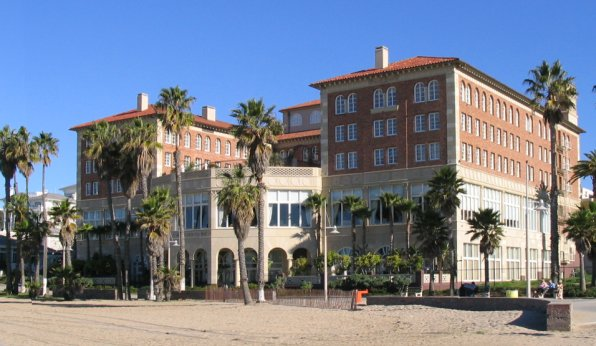
- Club Casa del Mar (seen here in 2005), at one time a Synanon facility
- Type: For-profit
- Genre: New Religious Movement
- Founded: 1958
- Founder: Charles Dederich Sr.
- Defunct: 1991
- Headquarters: Santa Monica, California, U.S.
- Key people: Charles Dederich Sr.
- Products: Drug rehabilitation

Synanon, originally known as Tender Loving Care, was a new religious movement founded in 1958 by Charles E. "Chuck" Dederich Sr. in Santa Monica, California, United States. Originally established as a drug rehabilitation program, Synanon developed into an alternative community centered on group truth-telling sessions that came to be known as the "Synanon Game", a form of attack therapy.

It was said to be one of the "most dangerous and violent cults America had ever seen". Synanon disbanded in 1991 after several members were convicted of offenses including financial misdeeds, evidence tampering, terrorism, and attempted murder.

== History ==
=== Founding and early history ===
Dederich in 1964

Synanon was founded in 1958 by Charles Dederich Sr., a member of Alcoholics Anonymous (AA) from Santa Monica. At the time of Synanon's founding, those suffering from drug addiction were not always welcomed into AA because their issues were considered significantly different from those of alcoholics. Dederich, after taking LSD, decided to create his own program to respond to their needs. He was said to have coined the phrase "today is the first day of the rest of your life." After his small group, called "Tender Loving Care", gained a significant following, Dederich incorporated the organization into the Synanon Foundation in 1958.

The origins of the name "Synanon" are not entirely clear, with some claiming it to be the result of a group member slurring the words "symposium" and "seminar" and others simply describing it as a portmanteau of "symposium" and "anonymous". The word syndicate also means "an association of people or firms formed to promote a common interest or carry out a business enterprise". Synanon began as a two-year residential program, but Dederich soon concluded that its members could never graduate, because a full recovery was impossible. The program was based on testimony of fellow group members about their tribulations and urges of relapsing, and their journeys to recovery. The Synanon organization also developed a business that sold promotional items. This became a successful enterprise that for a time generated roughly $10 million per year.

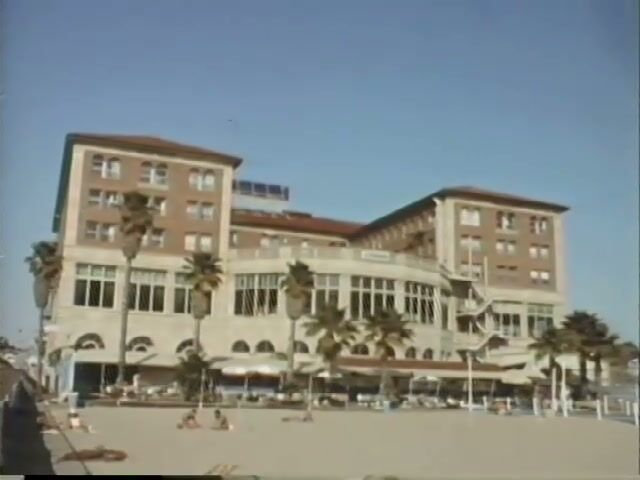
The Synanon facility in 1972

In 1959, Synanon moved from their small storefront to an abandoned armory on the beach. In 1967, Synanon purchased the Club Casa del Mar, a large beachside hotel in Santa Monica, as its headquarters and a dormitory for those undergoing treatment for drug addiction. Later on, Synanon acquired a large building that had been the home of the Athens Athletic Club, in Oakland, California and transformed it into a residential facility for Synanon's members.

Professionals, even those without drug addictions, were invited to join Synanon. The New York psychiatrist Daniel Casriel M.D. visited in 1962, lived there in 1963, and wrote a book about his experiences. He later founded AREBA, the oldest surviving private addiction treatment center in the United States, as well as at Daytop Village, one of the world's largest therapeutic communities. Control over members occurred through the "Game". The "Game" was presented as a therapeutic tool, and likened to a form of group therapy; but it has been criticized as a form of a "social control", in which members humiliated one another and encouraged the exposure of one another's innermost weaknesses. Beginning in the mid-1970s, women in Synanon were required to shave their heads, and married couples were made to break up and take new partners. Men were given forced vasectomies, and a few pregnant women were forced to have abortions.

Leonard Nimoy taught drama classes to members of Synanon partly as a result of the role he played in the production of Deathwatch, a 1965 English-language film version of Jean Genet's play Haute Surveillance (the story deals with three prison inmates). Nimoy is quoted as saying "Give a little here and it always comes back". The film director George Lucas needed a large group of people with shaved heads for the filming of his movie THX 1138 and hired some of his extras from Synanon. Robert Altman hired members of Synanon to be extras for the gambling scenes in his movie, California Split.

As Synanon expanded its operations in Marin County during the 1970s, conflict with neighboring residents intensified, particularly around the organization's treatment of children and adolescents. Former members and later reporting described children fleeing Synanon's Marshall ranch and nearby facilities, alleging beatings, forced labor, intimidation, and harsh living conditions. Local ranching families, most notably Alvin and Doris Gambonini, became part of an informal support network that provided escaping children with food, shelter, telephone access, and money for transportation home. According to reporting by SFGate, the Gamboninis assisted dozens of runaways over several years, actions that reportedly angered Synanon leadership and contributed to escalating tensions between the organization and local residents. In June 1975, members of Synanon allegedly attacked the Gambonini family on Marshall–Petaluma Road, surrounding their vehicle, attempting to pull Alvin Gambonini from the driver's seat, and blocking the roadway until sheriff's deputies arrived.

== Practices ==
Entrance into the Synanon community required a strong initial commitment. Newcomers were first interviewed by Synanon leadership to gain entrance into the community. Upon their arrival, those newcomers were forced to quit using drugs cold turkey, going through withdrawal for the first few days in the program. Furthermore, for their first ninety days in the community, members were expected to cease contact with outside friends and family.

During its first decade, Synanon members entered a 1–2-year program in three stages aimed at preparing them to reenter society. During the first stage, members did community and housekeeping labor. During the second stage, members worked outside the community but still resided within it. Finally, during the third stage, members both worked and lived outside of the community, but still attended regular meetings. After Synanon's transition into an alternate society in 1968, this program changed to a "lifetime rehabilitation" program, with the premise that drug addicts would never truly be well enough to return to society.

One of the most distinguishing practices of the Synanon community was a therapeutic practice commonly referred to as "The Game". The Game was a session during which one member would talk about themselves and then endure intense criticism by their peers. During this practice, members were encouraged to be critical of everything, using harsh and profane language. The practice has been characterized as a form of attack therapy. Outside of The Game, members were required to act civilly to each other. While in The Game, members criticized each other but left as friends and supportive community members. The Game served not only as Synanon's most prominent form of therapy and personal change, but also as a way for leaders to gather community members' opinions. Because there was no hierarchy in The Game, members could freely criticize Synanon's highest leadership, who would then take member concerns into consideration when deciding policy. The Game evolved into a 72-hour version and was acknowledged by Dederich as brainwashing. The Game was eventually used to pressure people to submit to Dederich's will, abort pregnancies, undergo vasectomies, and commit violence.

Over time, Dederich's vision of Synanon evolved, and he began to envision the group's potential to promote social progress. Synanon began providing education for members, and Dederich wanted members to undergo mental change to improve society on the outside. The school was headed by Al Bauman, who believed in an innovative philosophy and aimed to teach children in the same manner to think differently. The school attracted lawyers, screenwriters, and business executives, all wanting to educate their children in a progressive environment.

== Lifetime rehabilitation concept ==
Beginning in 1964, the legal authorities began to investigate Synanon's practices. The concept of "lifetime rehabilitation" did not agree with therapeutic norms, and it was alleged in 1961 by the city of Santa Monica that Synanon was "operating a hospital in a residential zone". Synanon expanded an old Trans-Pacific Marconi RCA radio station in Tomales Bay, now a hotel, in Marshall, California. It was alleged that on remote properties in California such as at Marshall and in Badger, California, Synanon erected buildings without the legally required permits, had created a trash dump, and built an airstrip. Taxation issues also arose. In response to the accusations, Dederich declared that Synanon was a tax exempt religious organization, the "Church of Synanon".

Legal problems continued, despite the change. Children who had been assigned to Synanon began running away, and an "underground railroad" had been created in the area that sought to help them return to their parents. Beatings of Synanon's opponents and its ex-members, "splittees", occurred across California. Beatings occurred in Synanon basements. A state grand jury in Marin County issued a scathing report in 1978 attacking Synanon for the very strong evidence of its child abuse, and also for the monetary profits that flowed to Dederich. The grand jury report also rebuked the governmental authorities involved for their lack of oversight, although it stopped short of directly interceding in the Synanon situation.

== Criminal activity and collapse ==
Dederich in 1977

While Synanon initially did not tolerate violence, Dederich came to allow for violence as he sought greater control over the group. Much of the violence by Synanon was carried out by an internal group called the "Imperial Marines". Over 80 violent acts were committed, including mass beatings that hospitalized teenagers, and ranchers who were beaten in front of their families. People who left Synanon risked physical violence for being a "splittee"; one ex-member, Phil Ritter, was beaten so severely that his skull was fractured and he subsequently fell into a coma with a near-fatal case of bacterial meningitis.

In mid-1978, NBC Nightly News produced a segment on the controversies surrounding Synanon. After the broadcast, several NBC executives including the network's chairman, allegedly received hundreds of threats from Synanon supporters. On October 10, 1978, two Synanon members placed a de-rattled rattlesnake in the mailbox of Paul Morantz, an attorney who had successfully brought a suit against the group on behalf of Synanon detainees. The snake bit Morantz, and he was hospitalized for six days but recovered.

Six weeks after the snake attack, the Los Angeles Police Department (LAPD) performed a search of the ranch in Badger that found a recorded speech by Dederich in which he said, "We're not going to mess with the old-time, turn-the-other-cheek religious postures... Our religious posture is: Don't mess with us. You can get killed dead, literally dead... These are real threats", he said. "They are draining life's blood from us, and expecting us to play by their silly rules. We will make the rules. I see nothing frightening about it... I am quite willing to break some lawyer's legs, and next break his wife's legs, and threaten to cut their child's arm off. That is the end of that lawyer. That is a very satisfactory, humane way of transmitting information. I really do want an ear in a glass of alcohol on my desk."

Though many San Francisco area newspapers and broadcasters covered the Synanon case, they were largely silenced by legal action from Synanon's lawyers, who made claims of libel. These lawsuits ultimately turned out to be a large part of Synanon's undoing, by giving journalists access to Synanon's own internal documents. The main thorn in the cult's side was the Point Reyes Light, a weekly newspaper published by David V. Mitchell. The newspaper was domiciled in a tiny town ten miles south of Marshall, where Synanon's main facility was located. The paper prevailed on press freedom and protection issues and its reporting was consummately professional. It won a $100,000 judgment against the cult and in 1979, for its efforts, became the smallest paper to win a Pulitzer Prize.

As a result of the snake attack, Dederich and two Synanon residents, Joe Musico and Lance Kenton (son of the musician Stan Kenton) were arrested and pleaded "no contest" to charges of assault and conspiracy to commit murder. Lance Kenton was sentenced to a year in prison. While his associates went to jail, Dederich received probation because his doctors claimed that due to ill health he would most likely die in prison. As a condition of probation, he was disallowed from taking part in managing Synanon. Dederich died on February 28, 1997, at age 83, after a series of strokes; the cause of death was cardiorespiratory failure.

Synanon struggled to survive without its leader, and also with a severely tarnished reputation. The Internal Revenue Service revoked the organization's tax-exempt status and ordered them to pay $17 million in back taxes. That bankrupted Synanon, which formally dissolved in 1991.

== Subsequent treatment approaches ==
Mel Wasserman, influenced by his Synanon experience, founded CEDU Educational Services, a company in the troubled teen industry that owned and operated several schools. CEDU's schools used the confrontational model of Synanon. The CEDU model was widely influential on the development of parent-choice, private-pay residential programs. People originally inspired by their CEDU experience developed or strongly influenced a significant number of the schools in the therapeutic boarding school industry. The company's schools have faced numerous allegations of abuse. CEDU went out of business in 2005, amid lawsuits and state regulatory crackdowns.

Father William B. O'Brien, the founder of Daytop in Tottenville, Staten Island in New York (it also has a branch in Mendham, New Jersey) included Synanon's group encounters and confrontational approach in his research into addiction treatment methods.

The author, journalist, and activist Maia Szalavitz claims to chart the influence of Synanon in other programs including Phoenix House, Straight, Incorporated, and Boot Camps in addition to those already mentioned.

== Popular depictions ==
- Straight Life: The Story of Art Pepper includes several chapters (21–23) about living at Synanon from 1969 to 1971.
- The 1965 Columbia Pictures movie Synanon, directed by Richard Quine, was set at (and filmed in) Synanon; it starred Edmond O'Brien as Chuck Dederich, as well as Chuck Connors, Stella Stevens, Richard Conte, and Eartha Kitt.
- The 1984 TV movie Attack on Fear, written by T.S. Cook and directed by Mel Damski, is an account of the journalists who exposed the abuses; it starred Paul Michael Glaser, Linda Kelsey, and Barbara Babcock.
- Episode 22 of Mannix depicts Synanon members involved with a fictitious 1945 Daily Clarion bombing that killed 14 men.
- Hollywood Park: A Memoir by Mikel Jollett (founder of The Airborne Toxic Event) was published in May 2020 and describes Jollett's life in and escape from Synanon.
- The group is featured in the 2021 book Cultish: The Language of Fanaticism by American linguist Amanda Montell. Montell's father was a member as a child and spoke freely to Amanda about his experience in Synanon.
- On September 26, 2022, the TrueAnon podcast also released a 5-part series on the history of Synanon called The Game. Throughout the series, one of the show's hosts, Brace Belden, talks about his childhood experience in a correctional, co-ed private facility called the Monarch School, which has been closed due to allegations of widespread abuse under the watch of its founder, Patrick McKenna, a Synanon disciple.
- On January 13, 2023, The Last Podcast on the Left released an episode on Synanon as part of their series on the troubled teen industry.
- A four-part Paramount+ docuseries titled Born in Synanon directed by Geeta Gandbhir was released in December 2023. The series follows Cassidy Arkin as she seeks for the truth surrounding Synanon, which she grew up in, as it descended into a cult.
- Synanon is discussed as the source of the "tough love" approach used at the troubled teen industry facilities like Academy at Ivy Ridge in the 2024 Netflix documentary The Program: Cons, Cults, and Kidnapping.
- A four-part HBO documentary series titled The Synanon Fix directed by Rory Kennedy premiered at the 2024 Sundance Film Festival in January 2024, and premiered in April 2024.

== See also ==
- Human potential movement
- Élan School
- Cenikor Foundation
- CEDU
- The Seed (organisation)
