= Troubled teen industry =

Industry which claims to help teenagers

The troubled teen industry (TTI) is a broad range of youth residential programs aimed at struggling teenagers. The term encompasses various facilities and programs, including youth residential treatment centers, wilderness programs, boot camps, and therapeutic boarding schools.

The troubled teen industry is controversial, as many youths who experienced it claim that it systematically turns a blind eye to verbal, physical, and sexual abuse.

== History ==
The troubled teen industry has a precursor in the drug rehabilitation program called Synanon, founded in 1958 by Charles Dederich. By the late 1970s, Synanon had developed into a cult and adopted a resolution proclaiming the Synanon Religion, with Dederich as the highest spiritual authority, allowing the organization to qualify as tax-exempt under US law. Synanon rejected the use of medication for drug rehabilitation, and instead relied on the "Synanon Game", group sessions of attack therapy where members were encouraged to criticize and humiliate each other. Synanon popularized "tough love" attack therapy as a treatment for addiction, and the idea that confrontation and verbal condemnation could cure adolescent misbehavior. Synanon disbanded in 1991, after its tax-exempt status was revoked by the IRS and it was bankrupted by having to pay US$17 million in back taxes.

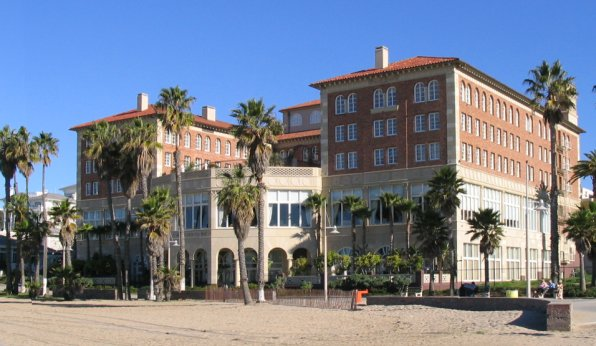
The historic Hotel Casa del Mar functioned as the Synanon headquarters beginning in 1967.

Synanon's techniques were highly influential and inspired human potential self-help organizations such as Erhard Seminars Training (est) and Lifespring.

Synanon-style therapy was also used in Straight, Incorporated and The Seed, two drug rehabilitation programs for youth.

Former Synanon member Mel Wasserman founded CEDU Educational Services in 1967, a company which operated within the troubled teens industry. CEDU owned several for-profit therapeutic boarding schools, group homes, and behavior modification programs. The techniques used by CEDU schools were derived from Synanon's; for example, long, confrontational large-group sessions called "Propheets" took cues from the Synanon Game. CEDU went out of business in 2005, amid lawsuits and state regulatory crackdowns.

Joseph "Joe" Ricci, a dropout from a direct Synanon-descendent program, founded a therapeutic boarding school called Élan School in 1970. Élan closed down in 2011 amid persistent allegations of abuse.

Synanon's techniques also inspired the World Wide Association of Specialty Programs (WWASP), an umbrella organization of facilities meant for rehabilitating troubled teenagers. WWASP is no longer in business, due to widespread allegations of physical and psychological abuse. Many WWASP programs were shut down by the Costa Rican, Jamaican, and Mexican governments after investigations into allegations of abuse.

== Media ==
- Joe versus Elan School, an autobiographical, web-based graphic novel about the Élan School.
- "The Sunshine Place," a podcast whose second season covers the stories of Students placed within Straight Inc.
- The Opportunist: Gayle Palmer, a 7^{+}-part series on Summit Quest
- Casefile: Case 296 Aaron Bacon, a podcast covering the abuse and neglect that 16-year-old Aaron Bacon experienced at North Star Expeditions of Escalante. The systematic mistreatment ultimately led to his death on March 31, 1994, thirty days after he joined the programme.
- Now Return Us to Normal, a 2024 film by Leslie Koren
- Wayward (2025 miniseries)

== See also ==
- Internet addiction camp
