= Wellspring camps =

Children's weight loss camps in the United States

Wellspring Camps was a group of children's weight loss camps located in La Jolla, California, and Melbourne, Florida. The camps focused on changing behavior and eating patterns to create long-term healthy lifestyles for participants. Wellspring Camps are not currently operating.

== History ==
Wellspring opened their first two summer camps, Camp Wellspring, and Wellspring Adventure Camp in June 2004 under the corporate name Healthy Living Academies. Ryan Craig, a former member of the Aspen Education Board of Directors, was appointed president of Healthy Living Academies.

Camp Wellspring, located in the Adirondack Mountains of New York, was for women ages 16 to 23.

Wellspring Adventure Camp, in the mountains of North Carolina, admitted boys and girls ages 10 to 17.

Healthy Living Academies' clinical program was headed up by Daniel S. Kirschenbaum, PhD. Kirschenbaum was chosen because of his experience in developing successful weight loss programs for hospitals across the country. He was a past president of the Division of Exercise and Sport Psychology of the American Psychological Association and had authored over 100 scientific articles and eight books, including Treatment of Childhood and Adolescent Obesity and The 9 Truths About Weight Loss.

=== Original advisory board ===
For the launch of its camp program, Healthy Living Academies assembled an advisory board consisting of experts in pediatric obesity. These board members included Kelly D. Brownell, Ph.D., Professor and Chair of Psychology at Yale University and Director of the Yale Center for Eating and Weight Disorders; Georgia Kostas, MPH, RD, Director of Nutrition at the Cooper Clinic, Dallas and author of The Cooper Clinic Solution to the Diet Revolution; Melinda Sothern, PhD, of Louisiana State University Health Sciences and Pennington Centers, and author of Trim Kids, The Proven 12-Week Plan That Has Helped Thousands of Children Achieve a Healthier Weight; and Dennis Styne, MD, Rumsey Chair of Pediatric Endocrinology at the University of California, Davis, a pediatric endocrinologist who specializes in pediatric obesity and its complications.

== Wellspring Plan ==
Wellspring Camps were based on their Wellspring Plan. The goal of the Wellspring Plan was to help campers gain skills and motivation for lifelong healthy living.

Typically, the only doctors on staff at the Wellspring camp were clinical psychologists that had been personally trained by Dr. Kirschenbaum.

The Wellspring Plan was based on the belief that simple, clear, and easily measured goals helped clients stay focused. The plan involved 10,000 steps of activity, on the premise that this increases a person's metabolic rate and accelerate the metabolism of fat.

Wellspring's nutrition plan was based on a low-fat, low-calorie diet: specifically, campers ate a strictly regulated diet of around 1,200 calories per day with fewer than 12 grams of fat. Wellspring claimed that this was achieved by teaching campers to cook, order, and identify healthy food choices. Wellspring campers were permitted to have as much "uncontrolled" food as they wished, as long as they measured and self-monitored their eating.

Wellspring's fitness and weight loss camps provided cognitive-behavioral therapy (CBT) for campers. Wellspring employed Masters- and Doctoral-level therapists (called behavioral coaches) to provide both one-on-one and group therapy sessions for campers. Behavioral Coaches also stayed in regular contact with families and campers for the year following camp as part of Wellspring's Continuing Care Program.

Two-day family workshops were scheduled at the end of each camp session. Attending families participated in all aspects of the program and learned the details of the Wellspring Plan and how they could be supported at home.

=== Program Effectiveness ===
Wellspring's long-term outcomes and approach were brought into question by the medical community. Many physicians and dietitians, including the director of the obesity program at Boston Children's Hospital, Dr. Robert Ludwig, MD, a pediatric endocrinologist, criticized their low to zero fat approach and questioned how successful Wellspring was in creating long term weight loss results. The American Academy of Pediatrics stated that children and adolescents must have a minimum of 20 grams of fat per day, but not to exceed 30 grams of fat, to maintain healthy brain growth. Wellspring taught its campers and families that this is not necessary. Additionally, Ludwig said that he was particularly worried about the effect on vulnerable teenagers who regain weight after their families have sacrificed so much financially to send them to Wellspring.

One of the more high-profile cases for Wellspring was Georgia Davis, who gained more than 500 pounds after leaving Wellspring.

Wellspring disputed these views, publishing their own study claiming weight loss maintenance for the majority of campers.

== See also ==
- Weight loss camp
