= CRC Health Group =

CRC Health Group is a subsidiary of Bain Capital that considers itself to be the "leading provider of treatment and educational programs for adults and youth" in the United States. Daniel Newby and Dr. Barry Karlin founded the company in 1995 when they purchased The Camp Recovery Center in Scotts Valley, California. CRC Health Group is headquartered in Cupertino, California. Now CRC Health Group is the largest provider of specialized behavioral health services in the country.

The company and its subsidiaries, which include Aspen Education Group, operate residential treatment facilities, outpatient clinics, boarding schools, outdoor wilderness camps, and a variety of other therapeutic program.
