= Excel Academy (Conroe, Texas) =

Boarding school in Conroe, Texas

Coordinates: 30°19′42″N 95°32′38″W

Excel Academy was a coeducational boarding school located in Conroe, Texas, established circa 1998 and operated by the Aspen Education Group beginning in 2001. Excel Academy was accredited by the Southern Association of Colleges and Schools.

The school enrolled adolescents with behavioral issues and provided a college preparatory high school curriculum and treatment based on the 12-step philosophy. Beginning with the 2007–2008 school year, Excel limited new enrollment to students with no history of conduct disorders and whose history included substance abuse as a primary issue. The school had required some students to wear orange jumpsuits, but the practice was discontinued in the 2007–2008 school year.

In January 2008 a Montgomery County sheriff's deputy who had been moonlighting at Excel Academy was fired by the county and indicted on charges of official oppression and unlawful restraint after an incident in which he was alleged to have thrown a male student to the ground, handcuffed him, and taken him to the county jail. At the jail, inmates reportedly undressed the boy and applied Vaseline to his back. In April 2009 the policeman was sentenced to 30 days in jail and one year of deferred adjudication.
