= The Seed (organization) =

American drug rehabilitation program (1970–2001)

The Seed, Inc
- Nickname: The Seed
- Successor: Straight, Incorporated
- Formation: September 23, 1970; 55 years ago
- Founder: Arthur Robert Barker
- Founded at: Fort Lauderdale, Florida
- Dissolved: October 1, 2001; 24 years ago
- Type: Nonprofit organization

The Seed was a controversial drug rehabilitation program in the United States that operated between 1970 and 2001. Aimed at youths, the program was modeled after adult treatment programs, with its techniques having been compared to those of the cult Synanon. In a 1974 U.S Senate report, its techniques were also compared to the North Korean brainwashing technique used on Prisoners of War during the Korean War. At its height in the 1970s The Seed had locations in Fort Lauderdale, Fort Myers, Dade County, and St. Petersburg. The organisation widely marketed itself as "spectacularly successful", "teaching love", and received wide press coverage. There was also a location in Cleveland, Ohio. Art Barker and his entourage would travel back and forth a couple times a month.

Following the release of the Senate report, along with criticisms from experts about the techniques and high suicide rate of the attendees, The Seed began to decline over the next two decades. By 2001, only the original Fort Lauderdale location remained, and the founder, Arthur Barker, retired and dissolved the organisation. Several other similar drug rehabilitation programs were founded in its image after The Seed's decline, most notably Straight, Incorporated.
