= Attack therapy =

Highly confrontational type of psychotherapy

Attack therapy is a type of psychotherapy. It involves highly confrontational interaction between the patient and a therapist or between the patient and fellow patients during group therapy, in which the patient may be verbally abused, denounced, or humiliated by the therapist or other members of the group. The method has been used contentiously and controversially by groups such as Synanon, Odyssey House, House of Hope, Excel Academy (Conroe, Texas), Straight, Inc., the John Dewey Academy, Allynwood Academy (The Family Foundation School), Élan School, Phoenix House, DeSisto School, Amity Circle Tree Ranch, CEDU School, Hidden Lake Academy, Cascade School, Monarch School, the Church of Scientology and in the large-group awareness training practices of the Human Potential Movement.

Attack therapy is one of several pseudo-therapeutic methods described in the 1996 book Crazy Therapies by the psychologist Margaret Singer and the sociologist Janja Lalich. A 1990 report by the Institute of Medicine on methods for treating alcohol problems suggested that the self-image of individuals should be assessed before they were assigned to undergo attack therapy; there was evidence that persons with a positive self-image may profit from the therapy, while people with a negative self-image would not profit, or would indeed be harmed.

== Methodology ==
Attack therapy has frequently been documented as holding group members captive, not being allowed to leave during the sessions. In Group Psychotherapy with Addicted Populations, Flores notes that attack therapy can take place when individuals are psychologically intimidated in a confrontational atmosphere. In her book Help at Any Cost: How the Troubled-Teen Industry Cons Parents and Hurts Kids, Maia Szalavitz writes that attack therapy can include the tactics of isolation, and rigid imposition of rules, which later leads to a restoration of limited permissive freedom, and an acknowledgement of those that did comply with the strict rules. Psychologist Donald Eisner writes in The Death of Psychotherapy that attack therapy "attempts to tear down the patient's defenses by extreme verbal or physical measures". Tudor describes attack therapy in Group Counselling, writing that the individual is ridiculed in front of others, and cross-examined and questioned about their personal behavior patterns. According to Maran's book Dirty, attack therapy can take place in "all-night encounter groups and daily interactions". Monti, Colby, and O'Leary write in Adolescents, Alcohol, and Substance Abuse that in attack therapy, there was a movement to: "tear them down in order to build them up", referring to a methodology of tearing down the individual ego in order to then educate the individual in the inherent thought-patterns of the group and the group leader.

In Concise Encyclopedia of Psychology, Corsini and Auerbach note that attack therapy puts an emphasis on the expression of anger by each individual. One Nation Under Therapy by Satel and Sommers characterized attack therapy as among the "more bizarre expressive therapies", and put it in the same category as The Primal Scream, Nude Encounter, and Rolfing. In Social Problems, Coleman and Cressey write that in attack therapy, one individual is criticized and "torn down" by the rest of the larger group.

== Groups that use attack therapy ==
In their textbook Helping People Change, Kanfer and Goldstein note that the controversial group Synanon used a form of attack therapy. A publication by the National Association for Mental Health wrote that the Synanon form of attack therapy was also called the "Synanon confrontation game". The Concise Encyclopedia of Psychology also described the Synanon method of attack therapy, noting that it even differed from other models that could be seen as using a similar approach. Balgooyen compared "Synanon game verbal attack therapy" to standard group therapy, in a study published in the Journal of Community Psychology. In Dictionary of American Penology, Williams writes that attack therapy was actually first developed in the Synanon group. In Therapeutic Communities for the Treatment of Drug Users, it is noted that in Synanon, attack therapy was referred to within the group by members simply as "The Game". Similarly, the attack therapy techniques used in Synanon have been described in the Therapeutic Community by a former participant as "brutal and bordering upon sadism". In addition to comparisons to Synanon, Miller and Rolnick also compare the methods of attack therapy to Scared Straight!, and "therapeutic" boot camps, in their book Motivational Interviewing: Preparing People for Change. They note that the supporters of attack therapy believe that: "...people don't change because they haven't suffered enough". In her book Help at Any Cost: How the Troubled-Teen Industry Cons Parents and Hurts Kids, Maia Szalavitz describes the abusive attack therapy techniques by Straight, Inc. This method of therapy was also used at the now defunct Élan School. Part of the reason for Élan being closed was due to pressure from activists who saw the usage of this form of therapy as wrong and humiliating. Rumors of the use of attack therapy also surround the John Dewey Academy, as many ex-residents have written online about the brutal three-hour, thrice a week "confrontation groups" that make up the treatment program at the school.

The WWASP schools used a modified version of attack therapy, along with various other types of therapy, in the different seminars their students were required to attend in order to graduate. Some schools under the WWASP umbrella used it more often than others; for instance, attack therapy was frequently a part of the daily routine at Tranquillity Bay and Cross Creek.

== Consequences ==
A study of group therapy in over 200 normal college students conducted by Yalom and Lieberman found that 9.1% of the students who completed over half of a series of "encounter groups" using attack therapy had psychological damage lasting at least six months. The most dangerous groups were the Synanon-style groups with a harsh, authoritarian leader.

William Miller and colleagues found that the more confrontational a counselor was, the more his or her clients with alcohol problems drank.

A 1979 study cited in Broadening the base of treatment for alcohol problems: report of a study by a committee of the Institute of Medicine, Division of Mental Health and Behavioral Medicine (1990) found that attack therapy applied to a "heterogeneous correctional population" did not result in a net benefit to the treatment group. The study noted that approximately half the individuals had benefited, while the other half had not been helped, or seemed in fact to have been harmed. The people who had been helped by the therapy were those who—according to the psychometric assessment carried out at the beginning of the study—had a positive self-image. The participants who had a negative self-image did not benefit from attack therapy. The report suggested that there should be a pre-treatment assessment of potential participants' self-image, and that treatment assignment should be guided by the results of such assessment.

== See also ==
- Struggle session; a similar method of using group-based personal attacks for the purposes of reinforcing political (as opposed to psychological) orthodoxy.
