= National Association of Therapeutic Schools and Programs =

U.S. trade organization

- Abbreviation: NATSAP
- Formation: 1999
- Type: Nonprofit organization
- Tax ID no.: 77-0511753
- Legal status: Non-profit organization
- Headquarters: United States
- Region served: International (primarily United States)
- Members: Therapeutic boarding school Residential treatment center Wilderness therapy
- Official language: English
- Executive Director: Alec Stone
- Publication: Journal of Therapeutic Schools and Programs
- Revenue: $1.6 M USD (2022)
- Expenses: $1.9 M USD (2022)
- Website: natsap.org

The National Association of Therapeutic Schools and Programs (NATSAP) is an American trade organization of therapeutic schools, residential treatment programs, wilderness programs, outdoor therapeutic programs, young adult programs, and home-based residential programs for adolescents and young adults with emotional and behavioral difficulties. NATSAP is associated with the Troubled teen industry.

NATSAP is not an accrediting or licensing body, though it offers a membership program via which member institutions can advertise themselves as NATSAP approved. To be members, schools and programs are said to be required to be in full compliance with NATSAP's published Ethical Principles and Principles of Good Practice. According to NATSAP, there is no process to assess compliance. The organization publishes a professional journal, the Journal of Therapeutic Schools and Programs, conducts conferences and workshops, and publishes a directory of its members. Schools that are NATSAP members often refer to themselves as "accredited" by the organization, and typically display NATSAP seals on their websites.

== History ==
It was formed in January 1999 by the founders of six programs within the "troubled teen industry," and its board of directors consists of program owners and educational consultants. As of 2021, all but one of those founding six programs have been shut down in the ensuing years for a variety of reasons, including child abuse, neglect, licensing violations, and successful class action lawsuits.

In United States House Committee on Education and Labor hearings in October 2007, NATSAP Director and Spring Ridge Academy owner Jan Moss Courtney stated that the organization had no process for checking up on this compliance, nor correcting any programs that stray from these guidelines.

A leaked 2023 phone call of Megan Stokes, NATSAP's current executive director, contained audio of her warning NATSAP facilities to reduce documentation and "paper trail," recommendations on how to identify requests from students who may be associated with anti-TTI activism or lawsuits, and how to slow or prevent former students and advocacy organizations from obtaining records that youth facilities may be legally required to retain and provide.

A recorded phone call of investigators posing as prospective parents seeking conversion therapy for a LGBTQ child to several NATSAP programs were told by admissions staff they agreed LGBTQ identities were "inappropriate," and NATSAP programs would not validate such identities, and could prevent their child from becoming bisexual or trans.

== Notable schools and programs ==
- Aspen Achievement Academy
- Diamond Ranch Academy
- Carlbrook School
- CEDU
- Élan School
- Hidden Lake Academy
- Logan River Academy
- Provo Canyon School
