= CEDU =

American private boarding school company

CEDU Educational Services Inc.

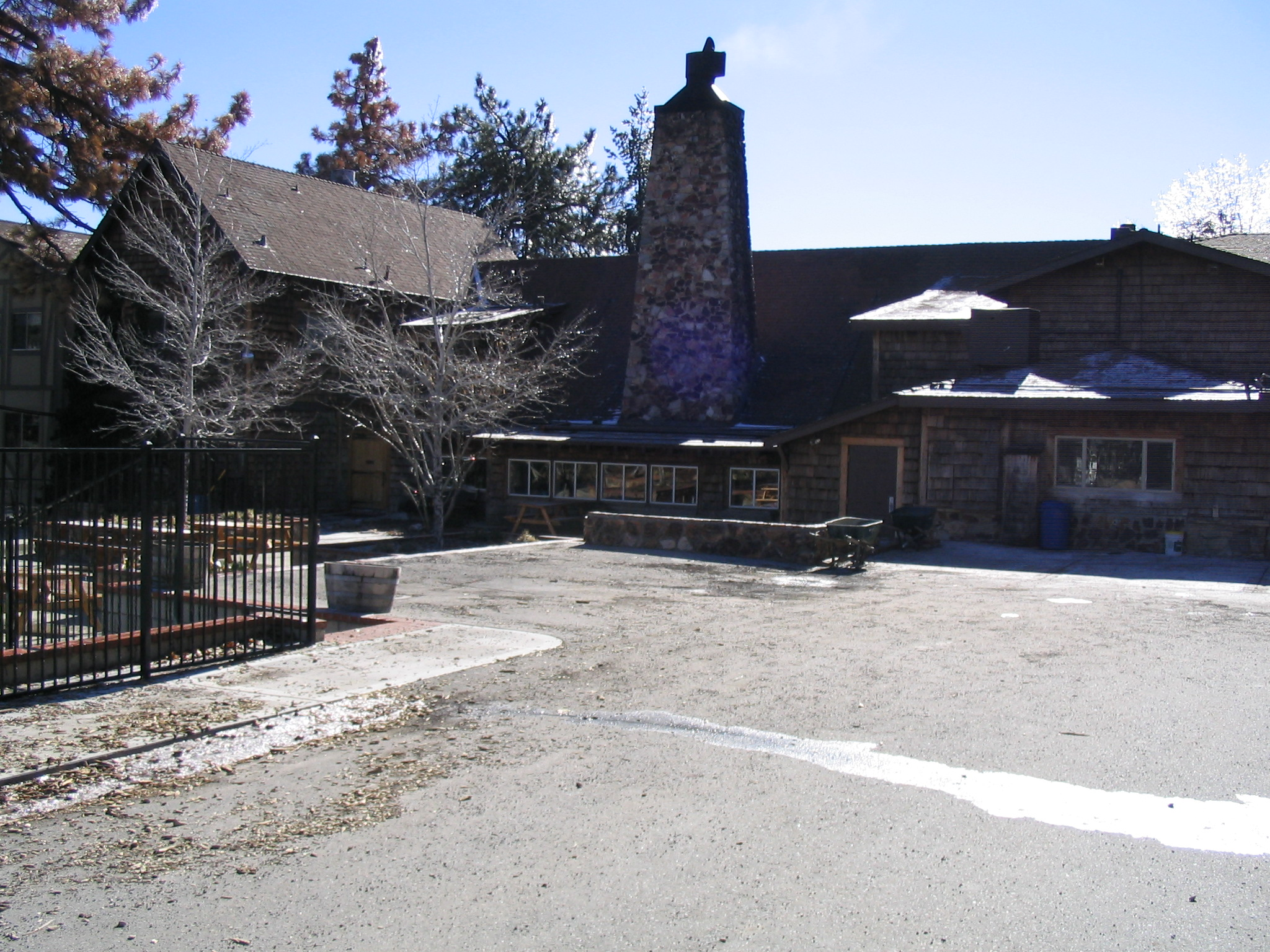

Location
- 3500 Seymour Road; Running Springs, San Bernardino, California 92382; United States; 34.190°N 117.095°W

Information
- Type: Private therapeutic boarding schools group home
- Motto: "See Yourself As You Are and Do Something About It"
- Opened: 1967
- Founder: Merle Wasserman
- Closed: 2005
- Accreditation: Western Association of Schools and Colleges

CEDU Educational Services, Inc., commonly known as CEDU (pronounced "see-doo") was an education provider founded in 1967 in Palm Springs, California by Mel Wasserman.

== Origins ==
CEDU originates from Synanon, a new religious movement within the Human Potential Movement. Founded in Santa Monica, California in 1958 by Charles E. Dederich. Mel Wasserman, founder of CEDU, was a former Synanon member. According to Maia Szalavitz, author of Help at Any Cost: How the Troubled-Teen Industry Cons Parents and Hurts Kids, "Synanon sold itself as a cure for hardcore heroin addicts who could help each other by 'breaking' new initiates with isolation, humiliation, hard labor, and sleep deprivation." The troubled teen industry has continued to be associated with Synanon and CEDU spin-offs. Former students have made the assertion that CEDU is an acronym for Charles E. Dederich University, while CEDU marketing materials claim that it stands for "See Yourself As You Are and Do Something About It".

== History ==
=== Origins and Early Years (1967–1981) ===
CEDU was founded by Merle "Mel" Wassermann and his wife Brigette Wasserman, in their Palm Springs home. Wasserman was a furniture salesman and had been involved with sponsoring people undertaking the Synanon program.

=== Expansion and New Programs (1982–1997) ===
In 1982, a small group of staff and residents known as the "original seven" left the Running Springs, California campus for Bonners Ferry, Idaho, to open Rocky Mountain Academy (RMA). RMA's curriculum and philosophy were identical to the original school, CEDU Running Springs.

July 15, 1994 - A male client from Texas hanged himself with a belt from a pipe of an overhead sprinkler system in one of the dormitories of Lower Camelot at Rocky Mountain Academy in Bonners Ferry, Idaho.

July 28, 1994 – It is revealed that a former CEDU employee and white separatist planned to kidnap students attending Rocky Mountain Academy for ransom, including the children of celebrities such as the daughter of Barbara Walters and the child of Clint Eastwood. The employee, who was reportedly a friend of Randy Weaver, was fired after federal agents uncovered the plot.

June 27, 1996 - John C. D'Abreo files a lawsuit against CEDU in Monterey County Superior Court, claiming he was physically and emotionally abused at Ascent wilderness program and Northwest Academy.

==== Idaho Educational Services ====
Universal Health Services Inc., a public company focused on hospitals and behavioral health centers, subsequently reopened three of the former CEDU facilities: Boulder Creek Academy (located on the former Rocky Mountain Academy property), Northwest Academy, and Ascent Wilderness Program, whose name they later changed to Caribou Ridge Intervention. These operate under the new name of Idaho Educational Services. Each program is overseen by individual directors.

== Program and practices ==
The average time a child spent at a CEDU program before graduating was 2 1/2 years. Teenagers were often held beyond their 18th birthday with Conservatorship or extended custody, until they completed the full program. The programs were year-round. CEDU had its own language, derived from Synanon. Three times a week, for 3–4 hours, teenagers would attend "raps," pseudo psychology group attack therapy sessions led by untrained staff based on Synanon's "the game." Children and staff were incentivized to "indict" residents for minor rule infractions, previous traumas, and "disclosures" or items individuals were ashamed of, in the name of emotional growth. This is commonly referred to as attack therapy, where screaming, swearing, and humiliation is appropriate and expected. At night there would be group touching, called "smooshing", which consisted of hand holding, spooning, snuggling, caressing, sitting on laps, and petting hair. Smooshing was expected of both teenagers and staff. It was common for staff to engage in this form of touch with teenagers.

In addition to raps, to advance in the CEDU program, a resident would have to earn the privilege to participate in a workshop known as a "propheet" every three months. The propheets were based on Synanon's "trip", and would last from 24 hours to several days at a time. The propheets were led by unlicensed staff along with teenagers at an advanced stage of the program, known as "upper school". They employed humiliation, exposure to large variations in temperature, guided imagery, loud and repetitive music, regression therapy, physical reenactments of trauma, and forced emoting. They included things like digging your own grave and lying in it, slapping each other, singling out a child to physically fight to get into a circle of their peers, being restrained on mattresses, or casting you live or die votes on a lifeboat. The propheets were based on the book The Prophet by Kahlil Gibran as well as the writings of Ralph Waldo Emerson and Henry David Thoreau. Each used "tools" from the historic literature, that were later used as stepping stones in the program that teenagers were expected to act upon in everyday life. There were seven propheets (Truth, Children's, Brother's Keeper, Dreams, I Want To Live, Values, and Imagine), and two workshops (I and Me, and Summit).

The three most emphasized agreements were no sex, no drugs, and no violence, yet there were agreements for every part of life, including timed showers, the way hair was worn, and the way people must speak. There were restrictions on clothing items, brand names, rock star imagery, wearing black, major league sports team logos and luxury brands were banned. Violators would be sent to the Ascent Wilderness Program located in Ruby Ridge, Idaho, which was CEDU's version of a six-week boot camp, or placed on a "restriction", which included emotional growth writing assignments, humiliating yourself in front of others, manual labor, isolation, "bans" or forbidding a teenager to speak to, look at, or be acknowledged by peers, and sometimes "bans" from singing, smiling, reading, learning, drawing, and being touched. Punishments also consisted of individual programs, like binding someone's eyes and ears so that they were forced to live like Helen Keller (who was blind and deaf), or feminine programs where girls were forced to dress up and act feminine, or boy bans, where girls where not permitted to interact with boys at all.

To receive a diploma from CEDU High School the students were required to complete 232 units. Diplomas were accredited by the Western Association of School and Colleges. Diplomas were not a requirement for graduating the 2.5 year CEDU program. Diplomas contained falsified credits, such as speech credits for weekly raps. CEDU did not provide legitimate high school courses. Often classes had no text books, and children were only allowed to participate as a privilege, which was often revoked. Many children returned home to resume high school.

== In the news ==
November 1996 - Former Rocky Mountain Academy staff and owner of Boundarylines Crisis Intervention Richard "Rowdy" Armstrong is accused of drugging, raping and sodomizing former Rocky Mountain Academy staff and Boundarylines Crisis Intervention co-worker Twila Stephenson.

January 14, 2004 - An article about Boulder Creek Academy titled "The Last Resort" is published by the Chicago Tribune. Several CEDU clients and parents are interviewed.

May 26, 2020 - Adam Eget, an actor and comedian known for his work with Norm Macdonald, talks about his experiences with CEDU on The Joe Rogan Experience podcast. Eget describes CEDU as an abusive cult, and talks about multiple examples of child endangerment he saw as a client attending a CEDU School.

September 14, 2020 - This Is Paris, a documentary that covers the time Paris Hilton spent at CEDU School, Ascent Wilderness Program, Cascade school, and Provo Canyon School, premieres on YouTube.

April 23, 2022 - Rich & Shameless started an episode one of their first season with an exposé on Girls Gone Wild founder Joe Francis. Dead, Insane, or in Jail author Zack Bonnie is interviewed about the time they spent together at Rocky Mountain Academy in the late 1980s.

== Notable alumni ==
- Neal Bledsoe, Canadian-American actor
- Adam Eget, American talent coordinator and former talk show co-host
- Paris Hilton, American media personality, businesswoman, model
- Jenny Pentland, daughter of Roseanne Barr

== See also ==
Related topics

- Continuation high school
- Oppositional defiant disorder
- Residential education
- Residential treatment center
- Teenage rebellion
- Therapeutic boarding school
- Troubled teen industry
- Youth rights

Techniques

- Behavior modification
- Brainwashing
- Operant conditioning
- Therapeutic community

Therapies

- Attack therapy
- Behavior therapy
- Group psychotherapy
- The Primal Scream
- Wilderness therapy
