= Wilderness therapy =

Type of therapy for teens in the United States

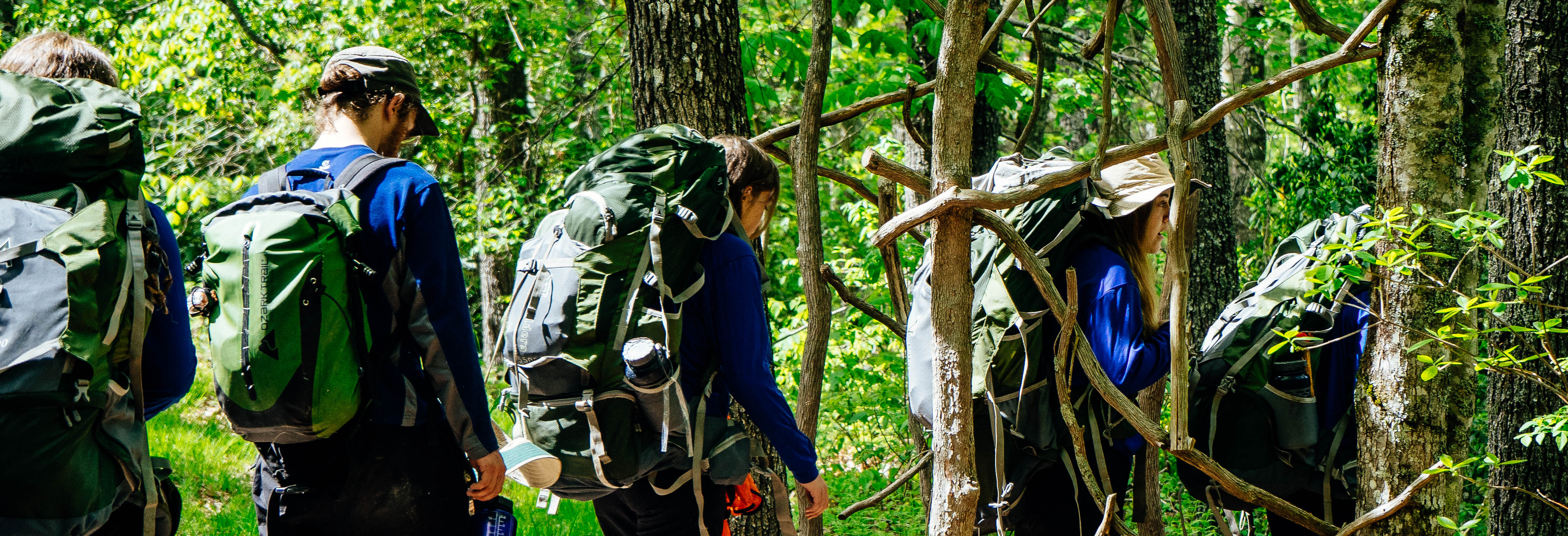
Backpackers at a wilderness therapy program

Wilderness therapy, also known as outdoor behavioral healthcare, is a form of therapeutic intervention that uses outdoor activities and immersion in natural environments to promote psychological, behavioral, and social well-being. It is used in the treatment of mental health conditions, substance abuse disorders, and behavioral issues, particularly among adolescents and young adults.

Wilderness therapy programs vary widely in structure and philosophy, but typically combine elements of psychotherapy, group processes, and experiential learning with activities such as hiking, camping, and survival skills. Related practices have emerged in the United Kingdom, the United States, Canada, Australia, and across Scandinavia, often influenced by local outdoor traditions and cultural perspectives. In the United States this developed into an industry of extended wilderness programs running for months at a time, sometimes with involuntary admission, combining aspects of military boot camps.

Wilderness therapy lacks a universally accepted definition, and programs differ in their clinical oversight, duration, and location. Some being much more remote than others. It has been the subject of ongoing debate regarding its effectiveness, safety, and ethical practices, with research producing mixed results and criticism based on regulation and reported incidents in some programs.

== History ==
The concept of wilderness therapy dates back to the 1940s, linked to progressive German educator Kurt Hahn, who founded the United Kingdom's "Outward Bound", an outdoor educational organization. Outward Bound combined physical activity, teamwork, and exposure to nature as a means of fostering personal growth.

During the mid-20th century, these principles began to influence therapeutic practices, particularly in North America and Europe, where outdoor experiences were incorporated into programs for youth development and rehabilitation. By the 1960s and 1970s, structured programs using extended wilderness expeditions emerged, and later became part of the troubled teen industry.

In the United States some wilderness therapy programs adopted some of the practices from military boot camps to address adolescents experiencing behavioral and emotional difficulties. These programs were classified as acceptable treatments for a range of mental illnesses and eventually developed into a distinct field although they remain unregulated.Intensive wilderness therapy programs became controversial after repeated reports of abuse, including cases where adolescents died as a result of harsh conditions and neglect. A 2021 BBC News article reported allegations of physical and emotional abuse within wilderness therapy programs. Former participants described experiences of isolation, harsh physical conditions, and limited contact with their family and friends. This further raised concerned about participant safety and lack of regulation across programs.

In the early 21st century, there are differences in regulation, standards, and philosophical approaches internationally, contributing to ongoing debate about the role and effectiveness of such therapies. Additionally, a study done in 2024 mentioned how it is important to acknowledge that participants enter these programs with different levels of psychological distress and reasons of going to wilderness therapy. Therefore, there are different outcomes. The researchers recommend more individualized assessments and monitoring to see what patients benefits from wilderness therapy and what conditions may be worsened by wilderness therapy.

== See also ==
- Outdoor education
- Experiential education
- Primitive skills
- Bushcraft
- Therapy
- Intervention (counseling)
- Group psychotherapy
- Educational consultant
- Ecopsychology
- Troubled teen industry
- Death march
