= Therapeutic boarding school =

Residential school offering therapy for students

A therapeutic boarding school is a type of residential treatment center for teenagers, developed in the United States in the late 20th century, which doubles as an educational institution. These centers are largely unregulated, and focus on treatment for addiction or behavior modification rather than education. While they describe themselves as schools, the selection of courses and teachers tends to be limited, and some offer only limited blocks of time each day for self-guided learning.

The first such centers emerged in North America in the late 1960s and became part of what was later called the troubled teen industry. In ensuing decades, students from other countries were sent to the United States due to the proliferation of such programs there.

These programs have been controversial, and numerous programs have been faced with lawsuits and allegations of abuse and neglect, including the deaths of students due to excessive physical restraint. They are part of a larger ecosystem of public and private centers that house youth away from their families, including juvenile detention (which also has obligations to provide detainees with an education) and youth rehabilitation centers for addiction.

== Description ==
Therapeutic boarding schools often rely on teen escort companies to bring teenagers to their campus against their will, and may employ guards to ensure they cannot escape for the duration of stays lasting for up to 4 years. As private facilities they are largely unregulated, with staff who are less likely to be certified than those at schools or hospitals. In 2009, the Government Accountability Office reviewed thousands of reports of abuse filed against such schools from 1994 to 2006, and studied 10 cases where the deaths of students in such residential programs were alleged to be the result of ineffective practices, untrained staff, and practices of physical restraint. In 2021, the American Bar Association summarized that "despite numerous allegations of serious abuse that date back decades, [such facilities] continue to operate in a largely unregulated way."

Most of these schools are based in states with minimal oversight of such schools, particularly Utah. They regularly accept transfers from other programs and detention centers, often across state lines. In the 2020s this led to some states banning referrals to out-of-state youth treatment programs.

== History ==
Therapeutic boarding schools developed in the late 1960s alongside therapeutic communities and behavior modification programs. Early examples included CEDU (bankrupted in 2005 after repeated accusations of abuse and manslaughter and the unsolved disappearance of three students), DeSisto School (closed in 2004 following multiple accusations of fraud, child neglect, child sexual abuse, and one case of manslaughter), and Élan School (closed in 2011 after public outcry, infamous for a boxing ring where students were forced to fight one another, leading to at least one death).

Over time, the model became part of what is often referred to as the "troubled teen industry", a network of private residential programs for adolescents that held them captive or transferred them between programs until they "graduated".

In 2008, the United States Congressional Committee on Education and Labor heard reports of abusive practices students had experienced at, such as Family Foundation School and Mission Mountain School. Since then, some US states enacted regulation and oversight of programs.

== Program model ==
=== Isolation and restraints ===
Many schools employ isolation as a punishment for not adhering to the program. Some of this practice can be traced back to Synanon, a drug rehabilitation center that became a cult with lasting influence on this industry. Some programs also include physical restraints and corporal punishment, ranging from being tied up to being beaten by staff or other students.

=== large group awareness training ===
Many therapeutic boarding school used large group awareness training.

=== Primal therapy ===
Some therapeutic boarding schools used Primal therapy.

=== Attack Therapy ===
Many Therapeutic boarding schools adopted the technique called Attack therapy.

== In popular culture ==
=== Books ===
- Gone to the Crazies by Alison Weaver
- No Direction Home by Greg Cayea
- Oh the Glory of It All by Sean Wilsey
- Stolen by Elizabeth Gilpin
- What it Takes to Pull Me Through by David L. Marcus

=== Films and Television ===
- Children of Darkness (1983)
- Higher Ground (2000 miniseries)
- Cons, Cults and Kidnapping (2024 miniseries)

== See also ==
- Behavior modification facility
- Residential treatment center
- Therapeutic community
- Troubled teen industry
- List of therapeutic boarding schools

== Bibliography ==
- Kolbe, Athena R. (2025). "Ethical Concerns with Referral to Privately-Owned Therapeutic Boarding Schools: The Case of Iowa's Midwest Academy". Child and Adolescent Social Work Journal. doi:10.1007/s10560-024-01001-x.
- Mooney, Heather; Leighton, Paul (2019). "Troubled Affluent Youth's Experiences in a Therapeutic Boarding School: The Elite Arm of the Youth Control Complex and Its Implications for Youth Justice". Critical Criminology. 27 (4): 611–626. doi:10.1007/s10612-019-09466-4.
- Golightley, Sarah (April 2023). "'I'm Gay! I'm Gay! I'm Gay! I'm a Homosexual!': Overt and Covert Conversion Therapy Practices in Therapeutic Boarding Schools". The British Journal of Social Work. 53 (3): 1426–1444. doi:10.1093/bjsw/bcad049.
- Golightley, Sarah (2024). "Troubling the 'troubled teen industry': institutional violence, epistemic injustice, and psychiatrised youth". Edinburgh Research Archive. doi:10.7488/era/4609.
- Hirsch, Frederick M. (2008). Teens in Crisis: How the Industry Serving Struggling Teens Helps and Hurts Our Kids. Columbia University Press. ISBN 9780231514507.
