= Beauty trends among American conservatives =

Plastic surgery and fashion trend

Suzanne Lambert mocking the "Republican makeup" look on TikTok.

United States conservatives in the 2020s have demonstrated at least two notable beauty trends. The first is Republican makeup, also known as MAGA makeup, MAGA beauty or conservative girl makeup. This is the style and application of cosmetics by people (including both men and women) affiliated with Trumpism. The style involves eyeliner, mascara, rouge, and foundation that are heavily applied so as to make their use obvious. This style contrasts with the natural makeup style. Kristi Noem and Karoline Leavitt have been cited as examples. Suzanne Lambert, a comedian on TikTok, is credited with popularizing the Republican makeup concept through a video she made shortly after Donald Trump's victory in the November 2024 presidential election. White House Press Secretary Karoline Leavitt posted a video of her makeup routine on social media that showed her using some of the techniques Lambert had mocked.

The other trend is known by the pejorative term Mar-a-Lago face, which is used to refer to a plastic surgery and fashion trend among American conservative and Republican individuals. Mar-a-Lago face is characterized by excessive or uniform plastic surgery interventions such as lip augmentation, Botox, and jaw contouring, coupled with spray tans, fake eyelashes, and dark smoky eyes. Cosmetic surgeons listed facial surgery, injectable filler, and cosmetic dental work among the procedures constituting the look. The trend is named for Trump's home in Florida, Mar-a-Lago. Public figures described as having the Mar-a-Lago face include First Lady Melania Trump, Matt Gaetz, Kimberly Guilfoyle, and Trump's daughter-in-law Lara Trump.

Some plastic surgeons have described Mar-a-Lago face as a distinctive and uniform aesthetic. The trend has been described as a status symbol among Donald Trump's inner circle, signaling wealth, privilege, and alignment with Trumpism. Journalistic and academic analyses have situated Mar-a-Lago face within far-right and Trump-aligned visual culture, arguing that a recurring, highly stylized face helps signal allegiance to Trump and project shared values among his supporters. Academics and fashion writers have also written critiques, observing that the Mar-a-Lago face look embodies an exaggerated aesthetic of gender performance that evokes drag queens, suggests that the superficial is the only important aspect of political policies, and marks the merger of political and celebrity culture.

== Origins ==
In Town & Country, Chloe Foussianes highlighted the depiction and costumes of conservative leader Phyllis Schlafly in the political drama television miniseries Mrs. America, writing:

"Each side swathed themselves in the image of the future they wished to create, willing it into being through self-presentation. For Phyllis Schlafly and her well-coiffed citizen militia, the uniform consisted of plaid button-ups, carefully-draped cardigans, and floral prints sculpted into postwar silhouettes."

=== MAGA makeup ===
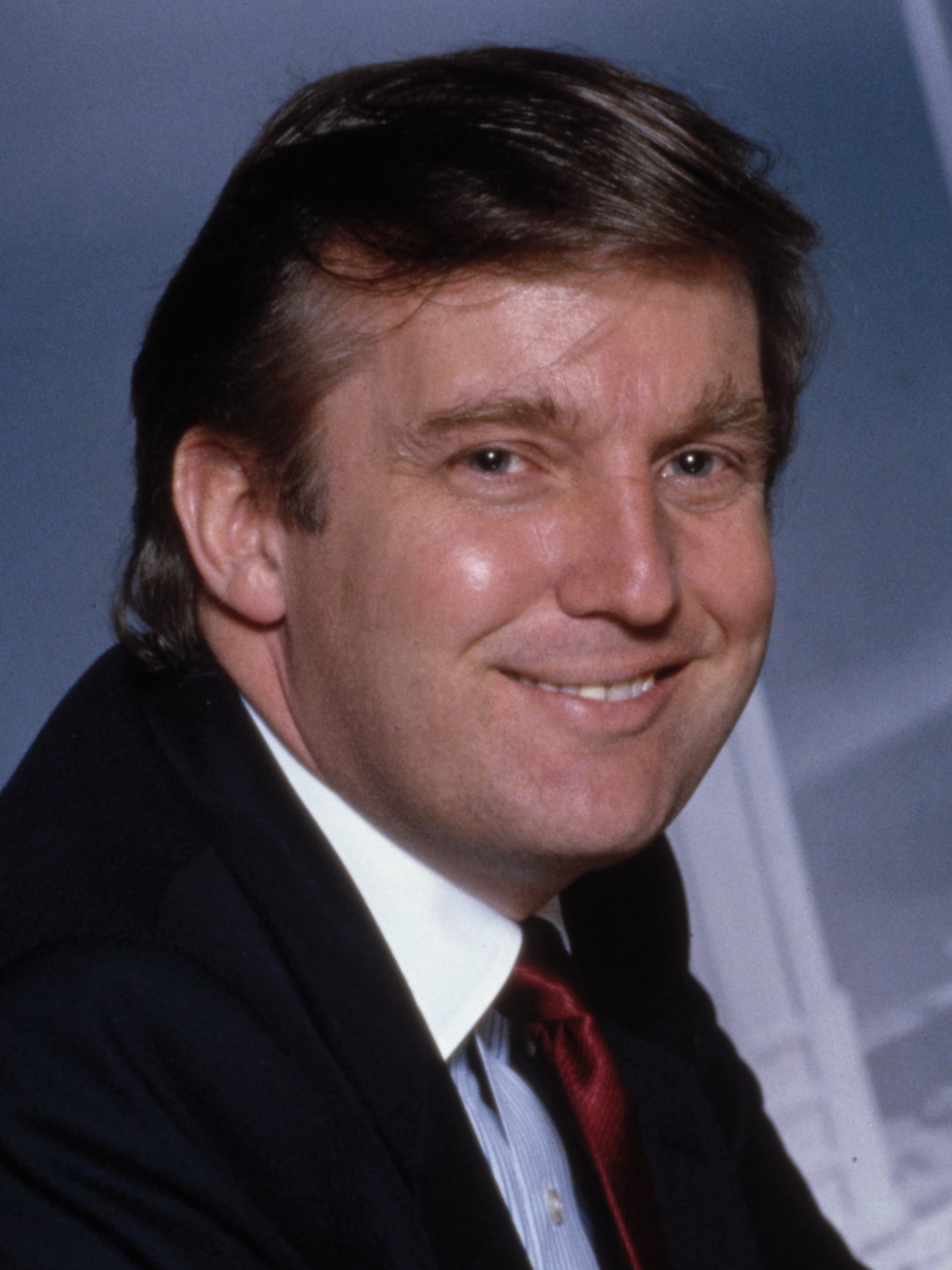
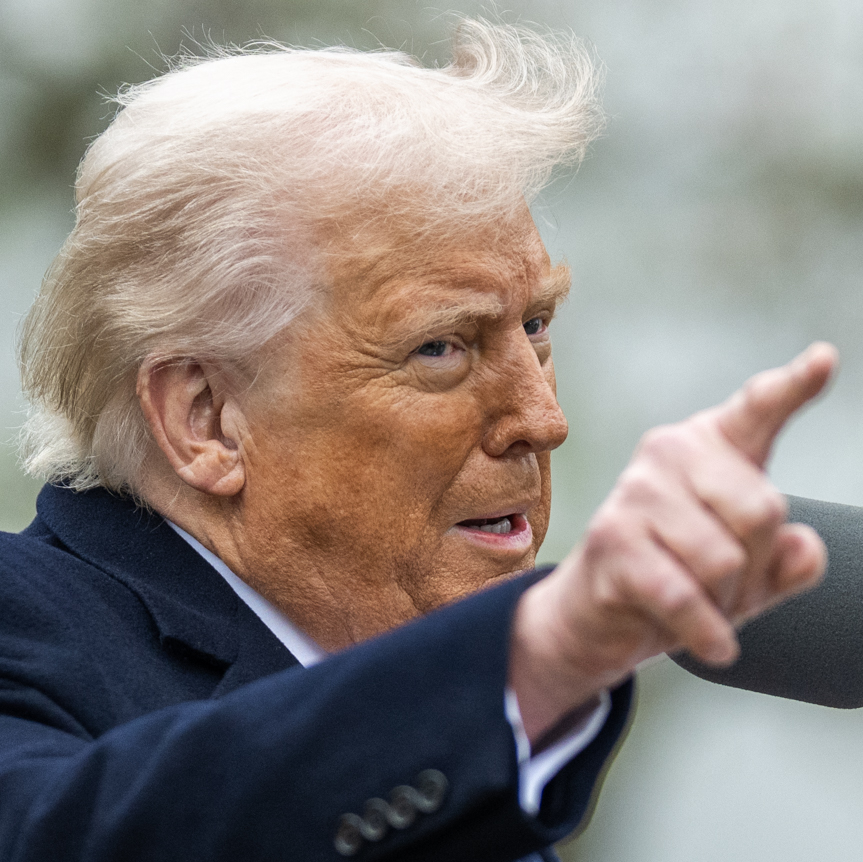
Donald Trump in 1985 and 2025. Trump's use of makeup dates from his television work in the 2000s.

Texas makeup artist Stephanie Louise got the assignment to make up Lara Trump, the president's daughter-in-law, for her speaking slot at the 2024 Republican National Convention. In an Instagram video, she detailed the various products she used and her techniques: blending three different shades of eye shadow along with eyeliner and false lashes to create "a respectful eye" and eschewing contouring. The look may have helped Trump get her own show on Fox News.

After the elections, Washington-based influencer and comedian Suzanne Lambert, who had supported Kamala Harris and other Democratic candidates in the elections, noticed that many of the women attacking her and supporting Republicans and President-elect Donald Trump in comments on her TikTok videos seemed to wear their makeup in the same distinctive style. As a self-described "Regina George liberal" who advocates for Democrats and political progressives to respond to Republican attacks in kind she devoted a video to trying to reproduce that style. Lambert is credited with popularizing the concept of Republican makeup through that video, which she made shortly after Trump's victory in the November 2024 presidential election.

=== Mar-a-Lago face ===
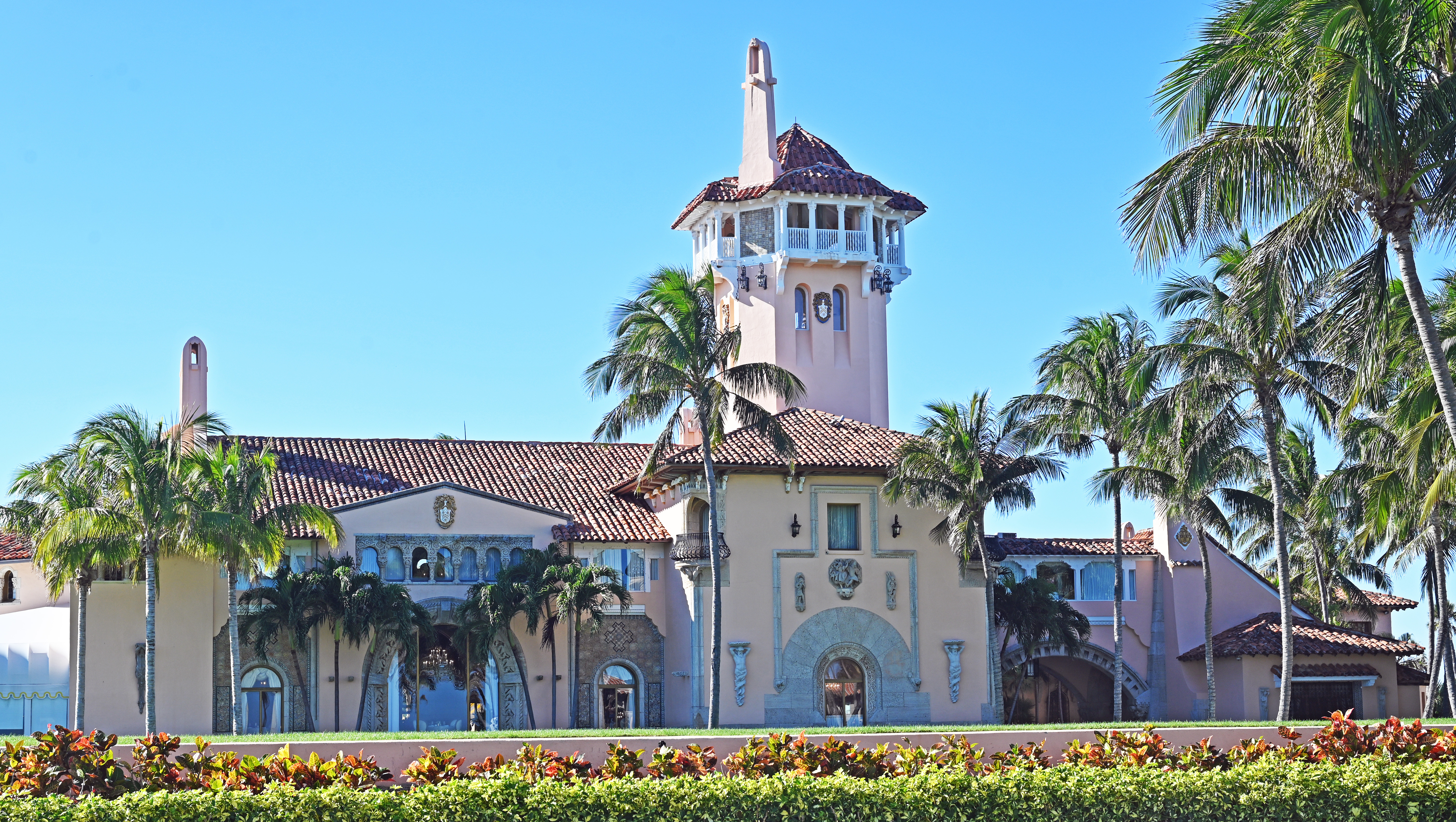
Mar-a-Lago in Palm Beach, Florida, for which Mar-a-Lago face is named

American conservative fashion trends have been depicted in media, and reported on in their historical and political contexts. Since before the first presidency of Donald Trump, discussion and media scrutiny has focused on Trump's grooming and hygiene habits. Fast Company observed that Trump's "unnaturally orange hue" was present as far back as his television series The Apprentice, which aired from 2004 to 2017. It was reported he appeared more natural until 2012 outside of broadcast appearances, closer to his natural Scottish and German heritage.

Mar-a-Lago face is named for Trump's home in Florida, Mar-a-Lago. El Confidencial reported in 2024 that the Mar-a-Lago face was first observed via Matt Gaetz, when he appeared at an event with a "completely different face". Vanity Fair Italia traced the origins of the Mar-a-Lago face concept to 2006, prior to Gaetz, citing the American reality television program The Real Housewives of Orange County as a potential origin of the trend. The Week called the look a "must-have accessory" for the inner circle of President Donald Trump. Melinda Anna Farina, an aesthetic consultant, identified the Mar-a-Lago face as attempting to emulate the appearance of Eastern European women.

In the South China Morning Post, Wee Kek Koon observed that Mar-a-Lago face was similar to King Ling of Chu of the Zhou dynasty's preference for "thin-waisted" officials, noted in the Annals of the Warring States as well as the works of Mozi. Koon notes that Mozi also illustrated further Mar-a-Lago antecedents such as Duke Wen of Jin, whose officials dressed in "sheepskin coats, cowhide belts, and undyed silk caps". According to Women.com, Mar-a-Lago face is characterized by excessive makeup, fake tans, fake eyelashes, dark smoky eyes, and lip augmentation. Vanity Fair Italia cited Melania Trump as an inspiration for Mar-a-Lago face. However, Habertürk identified Ivanka Trump as an inspiration for Mar-a-Lago face. In The New World, Nicky Woolf wrote, "origins of the Mar-a-Lago face could well lie in the Fox News anchor look," citing a preference of Trump to understand the world in "large part through a television screen".

== Analysis of Republican makeup trend ==
=== Lambert's video ===
Lambert posted her video, "Doing my makeup like the gorg maga girlies in my comments", to her TikTok feed on November 16, 2024. Her technique involves: foregoing the usual application of moisturizer or primer; foundation that did not match the wearer's skin tone, usually being too dark; concealer in a tone several shades lighter than the makeup's base; liberal use of eyebrow pencil; avoiding of contouring and bronzer; the lightest possible eye shadow with heavy black eyeliner, and dry mascara on the eyelashes; and tame lipstick without any lip liner. The video received 4.7 million views and many favorable comments. In an interview with Glamour two months later, Lambert emphasised the lack of matching and termed the eye makeup as a "raccoon-eye look." The New York Times observed that the look is usually sartorially complemented by form-fitting clothing and conspicuous cross necklaces.

In a resurfaced video reel of her makeup routine Karoline Leavitt, Trump's former press secretary, had posted to her Instagram feed some time before taking the position, she appeared to lend Lambert's take on Republican makeup credibility by using some of the same techniques. She purposely used foundation darker than her skin tone and an overly dark contour stick. The video also showed Leavitt using her fingertips to spread her makeup around, as Lambert had speculated would be done. The original video is no longer available, but some excerpts have been used in online commentary.

By the time Trump was inaugurated, Lambert's video had reached over 6 million views, and gained her followers including Jen Psaki, the former Joe Biden press secretary and current MS NOW host, and Jonathan Van Ness of Queer Eye for the Straight Guy. The media began to take notice, with The Washington Post running a story on the video as exemplifying Lambert's advocacy of "Regina George liberalism", named after the Mean Girls character—"when they go low we go mean".

=== Look and public reaction ===
One of Lambert's commenters called her take "the perfect tutorial for the mean girl to nurse pipeline." Others called it accurate. Other outlets added their own disparaging takes on the look. "[S]pray tan contouring that looks like it was applied in the dark ... eyeliner that looks like it was applied during a bumpy car ride," Betches said (similarly, The Cut's Sam Escobar wrote that they "imagine[d] it being applied with the frenzied fervor of the creepy kid in every horror movie.") Generally, "[t]he goal isn't to look good — quite the opposite. The makeup is meant to be jarring, exaggerated, and, well, a little ugly." Lambert characterized the look to the Times as "Inappropriate unless you're on a pageant stage. And in that case, I would still do it differently."

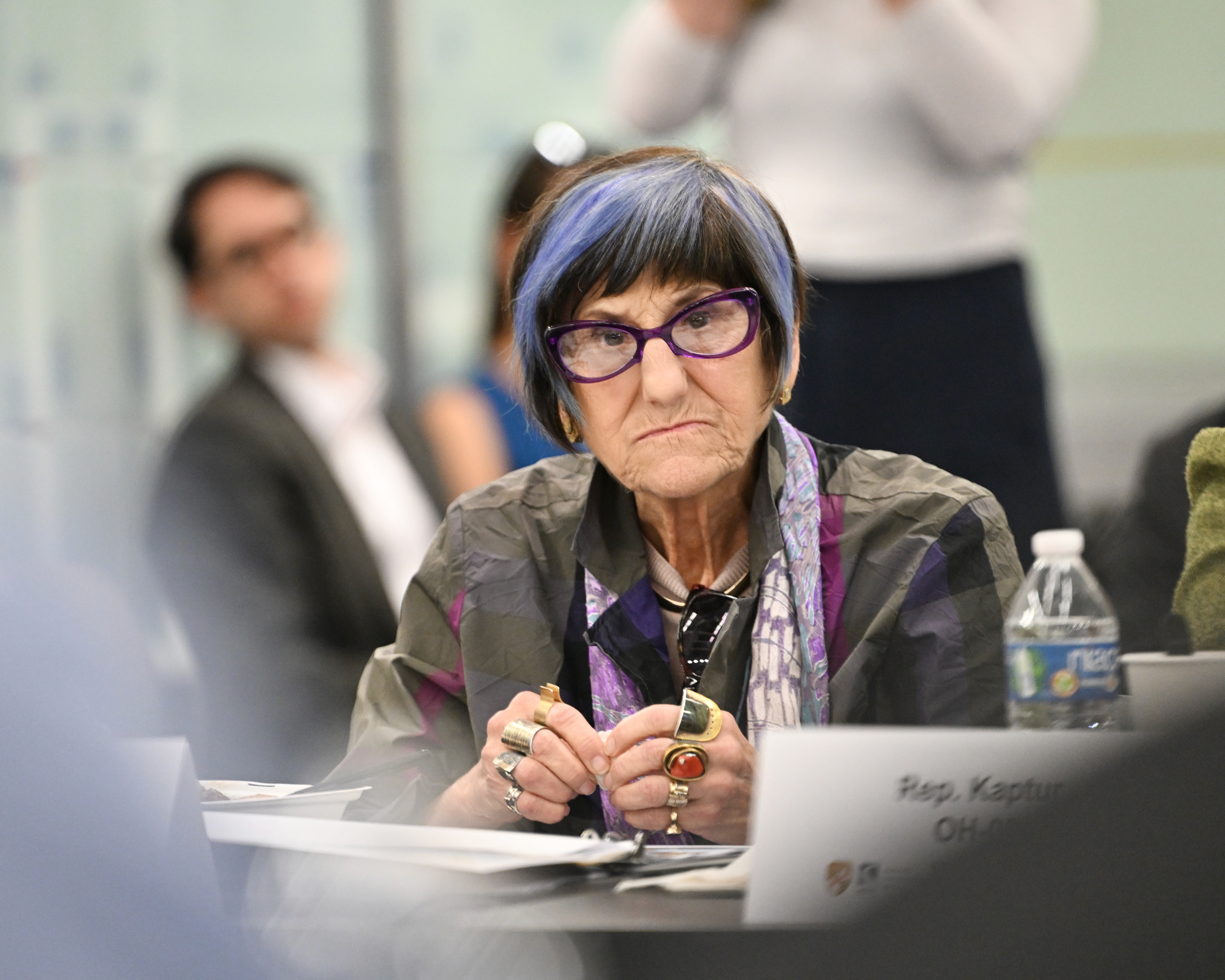
Connecticut Congresswoman Rosa DeLauro, whose dyed hair was cited by conservatives as an example of "liberal makeup"

Some women, like Guardian columnist Arwa Mahdawi, worried that they might have unintentionally emulated the look. Writing about the trend in The New York Times, Jessica Grose did not see any corresponding makeup style embraced by liberal or progressive women. However, professional makeup artists who had done the faces of women on both sides of the political spectrum did report an embrace of softer styles, particularly the previously popular "clean girl" look. The beauticians who talked to HuffPost noted that women on liberal-aligned cable networks like CNN and MSNBC wore less visible makeup. One said that she had specific requests from liberal women to avoid making them look like "guests going on Fox", and thus avoids using bronzer on them. The makeup artists interviewed by HuffPost had differing opinions, but many agreed that there was a distinctive Republican makeup style, one Noem and Leavitt were successful with.

Another response was to suggest that this was more of an issue of younger women criticizing the makeup styles of middle-aged women than politics. "Many Republican women haven't updated their makeup trends since the 80s," one TikTok user said. "Younger generations see the stale and crunchy makeup and can see how it can progressively be improved upon, but these women are too stuck in their ways to listen." However, other commentators noted in response that younger women such as Leavitt (whose use of the style has led to some questions as to whether she is as young as she says) and 76-year-old Linda McMahon seem to embrace the look. "The common thread truly seems to be a penchant for far-right politics," observes Allure editor Kara McGrath.

Some Republican women online responded by posting videos of supposed "liberal makeup", mostly consisting of piercings, neon-colored lipstick and non-natural hair dye colors, the latter often employed by Democratic Connecticut Representative Rosa DeLauro. Not all the criticism came from the right. Colette Carbonara, a Columbia undergraduate writing in the Columbia Political Review, feared that it might alienate some voters who might otherwise support Democratic policies and candidates while lacking "real substance". Many of the critiques on TikTok, she noted, admitted that the style was more common and less political in 2016. "By engaging in this caricature, liberals reinforce the stereotype of themselves as urbane cultural elites who relish the opportunity to mock people from the South or rural areas whose makeup is, perhaps, slightly dated compared to the newest trends in wealthy, progressive cities." Carbonara also argued that the criticism wasted the opportunity to effectively use satire on Republican policies and worldview and demonstrate empathy for voters they need to reach. Conservatives also voiced criticism. Former Fox personality Megyn Kelly lambasted Noem over her appearance when accompanying Immigration and Customs Enforcement (ICE) agents on raids with "25 pounds of hair, only to be outdone by her 30 pounds of makeup and false eyelashes."

Observers characterized the "Republican makeup" look as an embrace of visible effort made to improve and highlight one's appearance, connecting it to "Mar-a-Lago face", with clear use of Botox and plastic surgery in evidence on many women (and some men, such as former Florida Representative Matt Gaetz) at the 2024 Republican convention. Dazed spoke with Elysia Berman, a beautician who said on TikTok shortly after the election that she had seen changes in beauty trends which for her foreshadowed the election results, even among celebrities not associated with Trump or Republican politics.

Guardian columnist Arwa Mahdawi observed that some pro-MAGA influencers were even using the look as a recruiting tool. "Let's just be honest: it's never been hotter to be a conservative," wellness podcast host Alex Clark told the crowd at a 2025 Turning Point USA conference. "The left, they've got TikTok activists with five shades of autism, panic attacks, and a ringlight. We've got girls who look like they just walked off the cover of Vogue and can deadlift more than Harry Sisson." On an installment of Fox host Jesse Watters' talk show discussing actress Sydney Sweeney, a registered Republican, Fox Business host Katrina Campins said progressives were jealous of Sweeney's looks. "My advice to all the ladies, our side is better, and you get hotter, right?" Watters agreed with her that women who decided to identify as Republicans saw their looks improve.

=== Political meaning ===
The progressive magazine Mother Jones, noting how Noem, heavily made up and adorned with pearls and a Rolex watch, had accompanied ICE officers on a televised raid, described the overall look as aggressive, and "like Trump's politics, ridiculously blunt". The Cut agreed: "Overdone and underblended, it manages to be both frantic and calculated ... [making] the wearer look significantly older." While not calling the look itself aggressive, Grose took note of the aggressive actions US Representative Nancy Mace, Noem, and Leavitt had been associated with while wearing it.

Other analyses drew connections between the politics of the Trump administration and its aesthetic. Mother Jones took note of Trump's long ownership of beauty pageants like Miss Universe as the most prominent indicator of his interest in other people's physical appearance, regardless of gender. He reportedly insists on a certain "central casting" look for the men who work for him, that has been described as giving his male subordinates and associates "groomsmen vibes." Anne Higonet, an art history professor at Barnard College, connects the overall MAGA aesthetic to "the idea that the surface of a policy is the only thing that matters."

Like some of the HuffPost makeup artists, Higonet saw it as motivated less by aesthetics than by branding, as an indication of group identity. "What makes this group of MAGA politicians powerful is that they are so immediately recognizable by outsiders as part of the conservative team", Grose agrees. Trump is said to have chosen Noem for her DHS position because he wanted her face in television advertisements.

Feminist critiques looked at the phenomenon through the lens of gender identity and relations, particularly the modern Republican Party's insistence on strict separation of gender roles. "For women," wrote Women's Wear Daily, "this means that hyperfemininity, including the routine use of makeup, is the only acceptable norm."

Williams also finds this excessive use of makeup an ironic contrast with the transphobia prevalent among many of the women who wear it, since the time and effort involved in applying it shows that "[they] are the ones that are most doubled down on the performative dimension of gender."

Identity Hunters saw Republican makeup as specifically political, and responsive to the male gaze on the political right. "In emphasizing domesticity, controlled sexuality, and beauty, this femininity in a way subjugates itself to the idealized female fantasy of the conservative man—a docile woman who submits and doesn't rebel."

== Analysis of Mar-a-Lago face ==
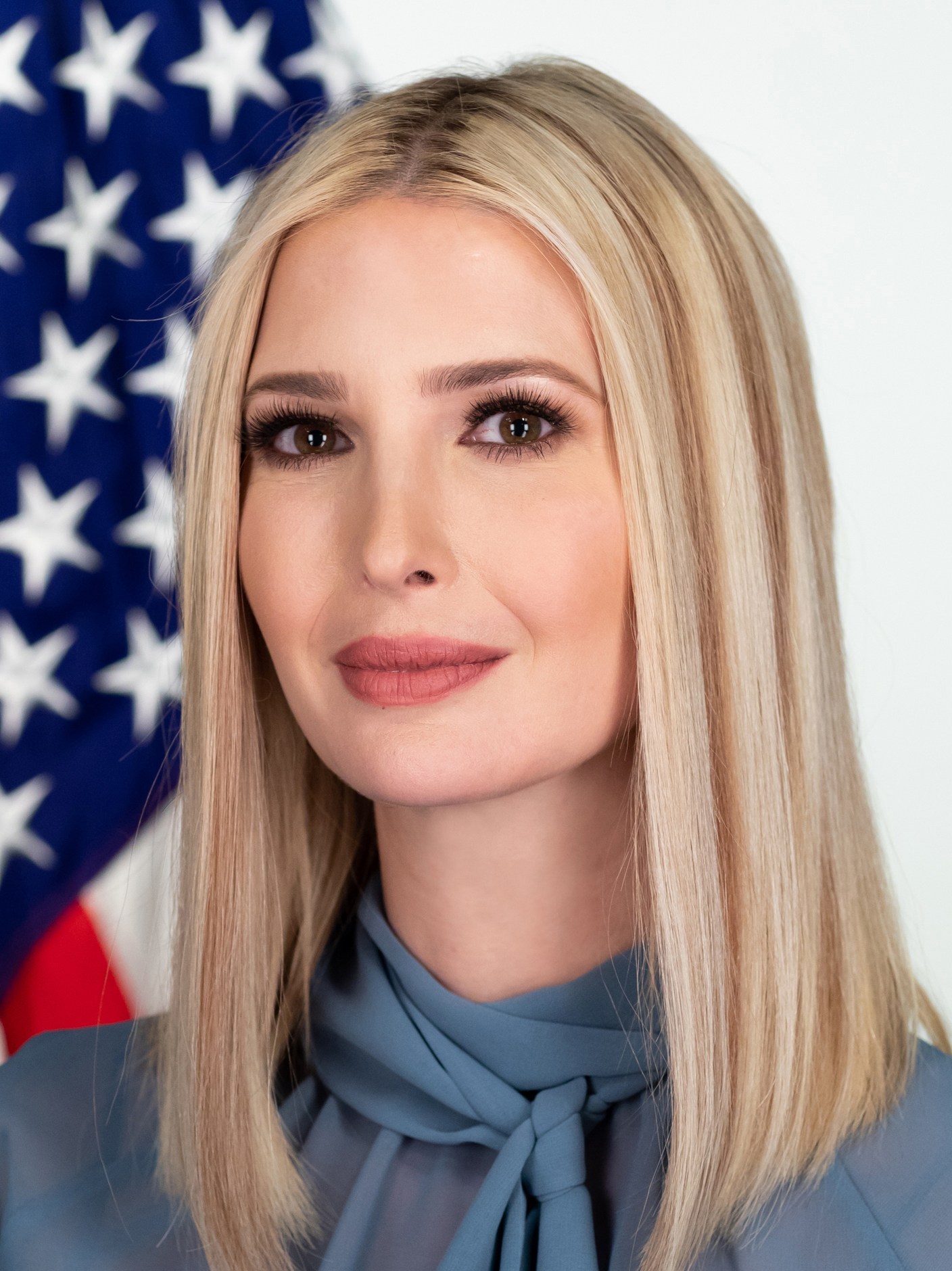
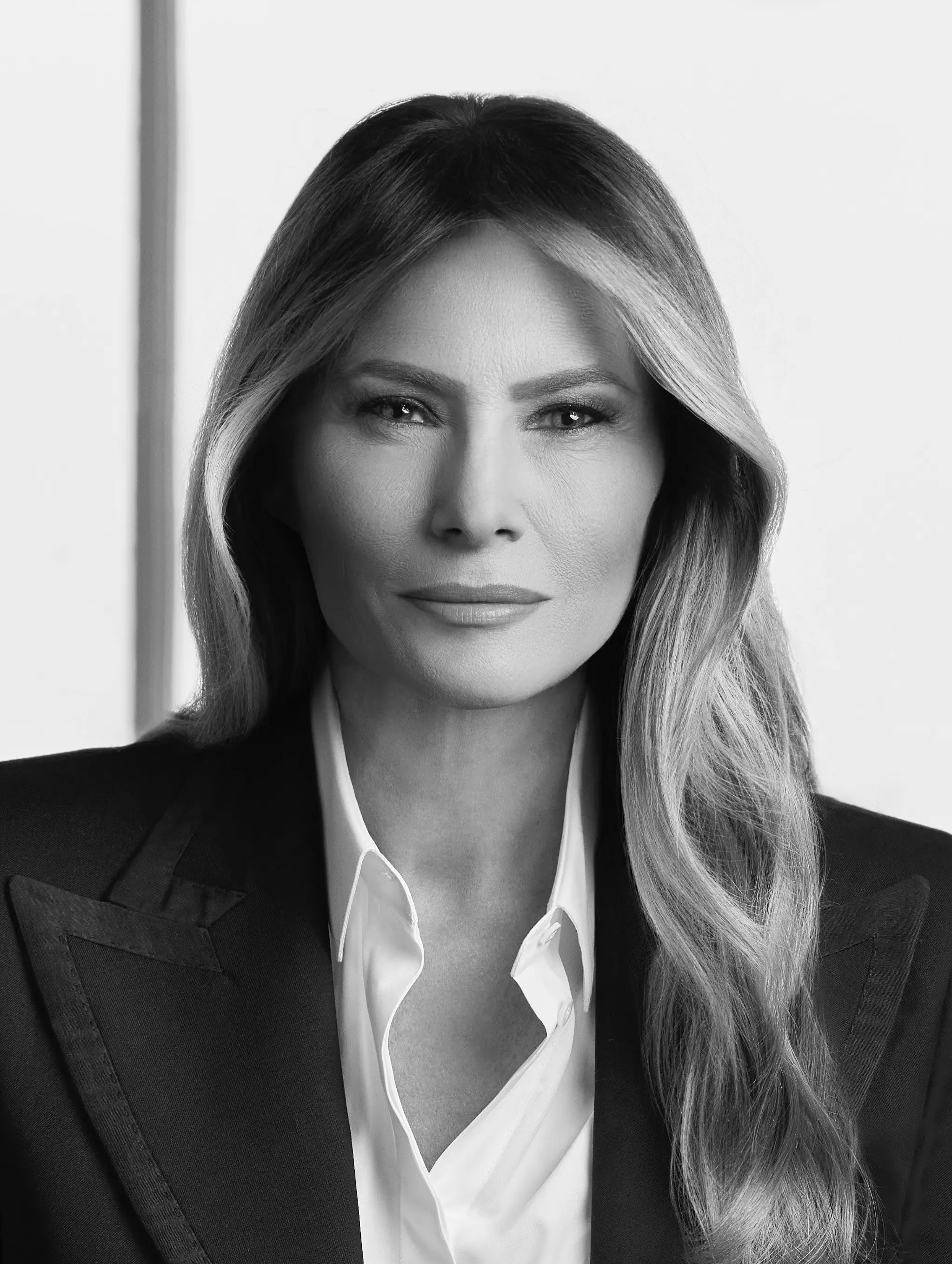
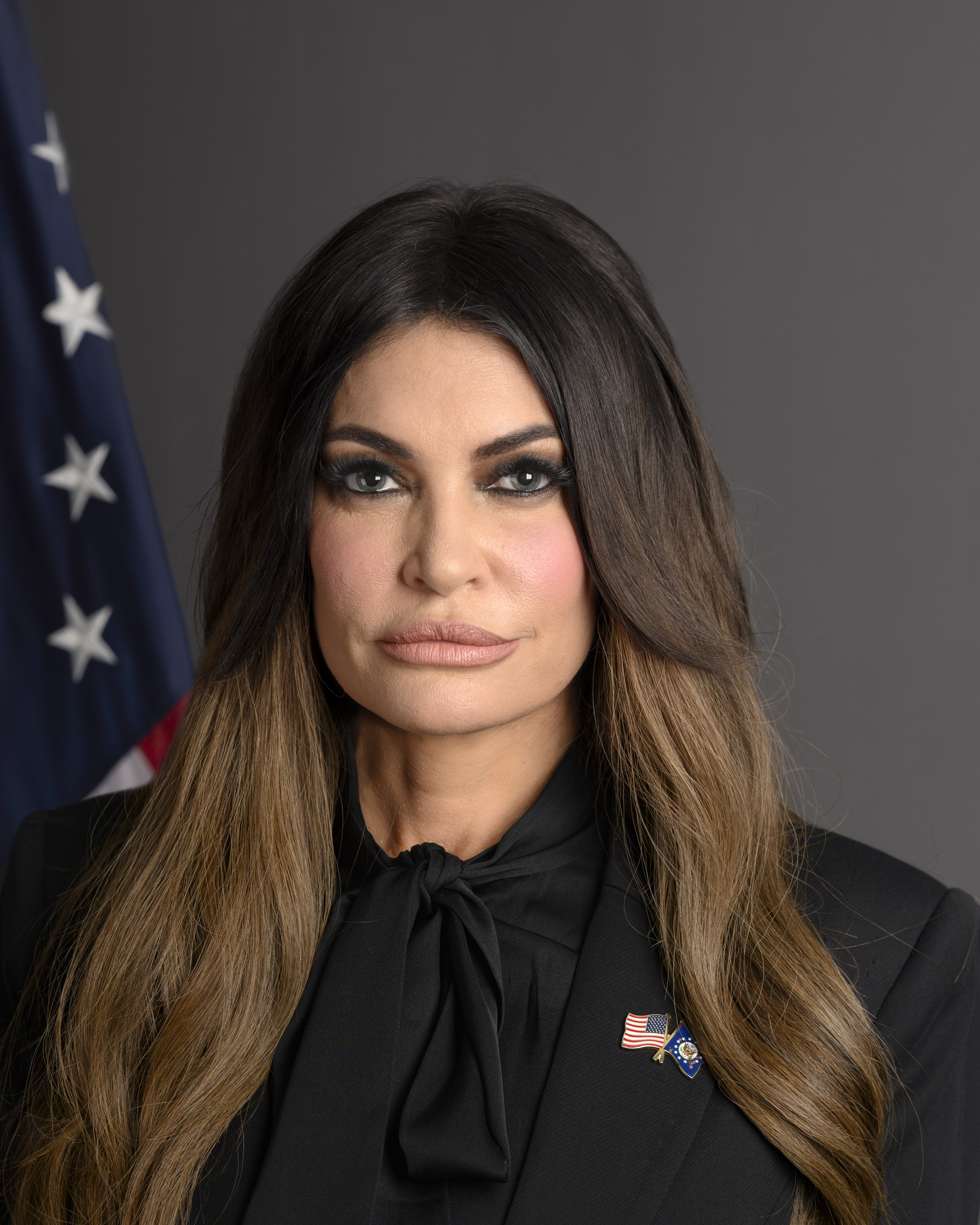
Ivanka Trump, Melania Trump, and Kimberly Guilfoyle have been described as having Mar-a-Lago face, with Ivanka often being considered an inspiration.

The New York Times called Mar-a-Lago face a "Trump woman" look, and noted it included but differed from "conservative girl" or "Republican makeup". However, Agence France-Presse framed Mar-a-Lago face and "Republican makeup" as the same phenomenon. The Hollywood Reporter describes Mar-a-Lago face as a "Fellini-esque exaggeration of the dolled-up Fox News anchorwoman look". One etiquette and image consultant told HuffPost that the aesthetic is designed to signal wealth and privilege. Beyond what this beauty trend may look like in practice, the use of plastic surgery to create a homogenized aesthetic has been attributed to the success of anti-feminist and far-right social media content. Megan L. Zahay, professor of communications at the University of Wisconsin, asserts that repetition of the aesthetic serves to amplify particular ideological beliefs, creating a sense of in-group homogeneity or consensus.

Barnard College professor Anne Higonnet argues the move towards this particular aesthetic serves as "a sign of physical submission to Donald Trump", in that the aesthetic creates traditional feminine and masculine features. Melissa Rein Lively, a MAGA political worker, was reported by Le Journal de Montréal to reject "any idea of submission or constraint" associated with Mar-a-Lago face, and that "no one forces me to do two hours of sport a day, to go to the hairdresser every three and a half weeks, to get my nails and eyebrows done, to get Botox." Juliet Williams, a gender studies academic and professor at University of California, Los Angeles, compared the phenomenon to "war paint" in "service of an anti-feminist ideology". According to Habertürk, Mar-a-Lago face is linked to a belief that the leader favors physically attractive subordinates.

Santiago Martinez Magdalena of the Public University of Navarra compares Mar-a-Lago face to "aesthetic eugenics", and associates it with "the Caucasian model as a hygienic and normative horizon, the choice of working models and the exposure of the body as the focal point". Catherine Tebaldi of the University of Luxembourg and Scott Burnett of Pennsylvania State University hypothesize the inclusion of men within this aesthetic to be a part of a broader trend in the US far right movement, bolstered by online image boards and publications, where both "hardness" and symmetry in facial features is seen as important to outwardly demonstrated masculinity. The promotion of a uniform aesthetic within the MAGA movement has been likened to body fascism, an ideology which prizes individual physical strength and beauty conformities as reflections of the wider political movement of fascism. According to Kyunghyang Shinmun, Trump supporters and some Mar-a-Lago faces have a "tendency to emulate" Leavitt. Pen, a Japanese cultural magazine, called Mar-a-Lago face popular among America's "upper class", and wrote "solidarity and security is likely created" by maintaining similar appearances.

Joan López Alegre, a professor at Abat Oliba CEU University, describes the phenomenon as reflecting Trump's changing base: "The Trump voter is no longer a conservative voter like the Bush voter, but a lower middle-class voter. It is not clear to me whether they want to be more like Romeo Santos or Barbie's Ken". He further states that Trump's aesthetics were seen as "tacky" in New York City, but are more accepted in Florida, and therefore may appeal to the evolving demographic support of the Republican party. A Boca Raton plastic surgeon said Mar-a-Lago face "whispers refinement", and a Washington, D.C.-area surgeon identified it as a "modern aristocratic mask". Tina Alster of Georgetown University Medical Center and Washington surgeon Anita Kulkarni noted that Mar-A-Lago face seemed to be an aspect of the Second presidency of Donald Trump, and that it was rare during his first 2017–2021 term. The South China Morning Post called Mar-a-Lago face the "unofficial badge of power in Washington" with an aesthetic described as political; the Post described it further as a "lacquered, petrified mask". Williams of UCLA also noted the political nature of Mar-A-Lago face, and that it became political by signaling that the "value of women depends on their desirability to men".

=== Surgical procedures ===
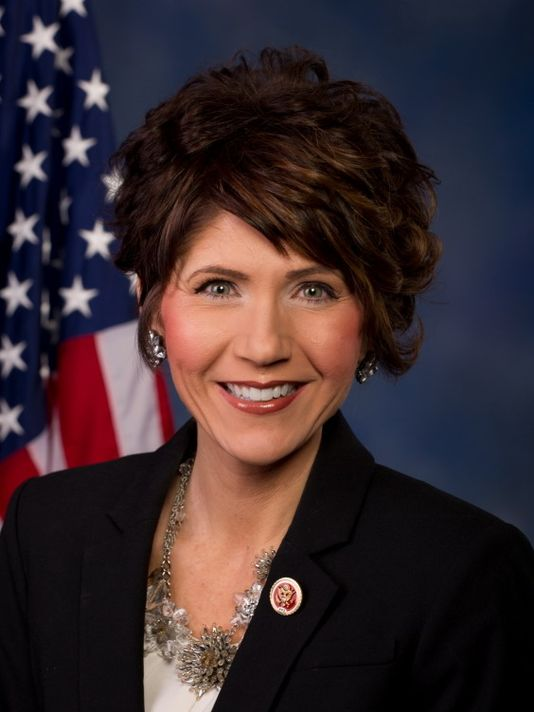
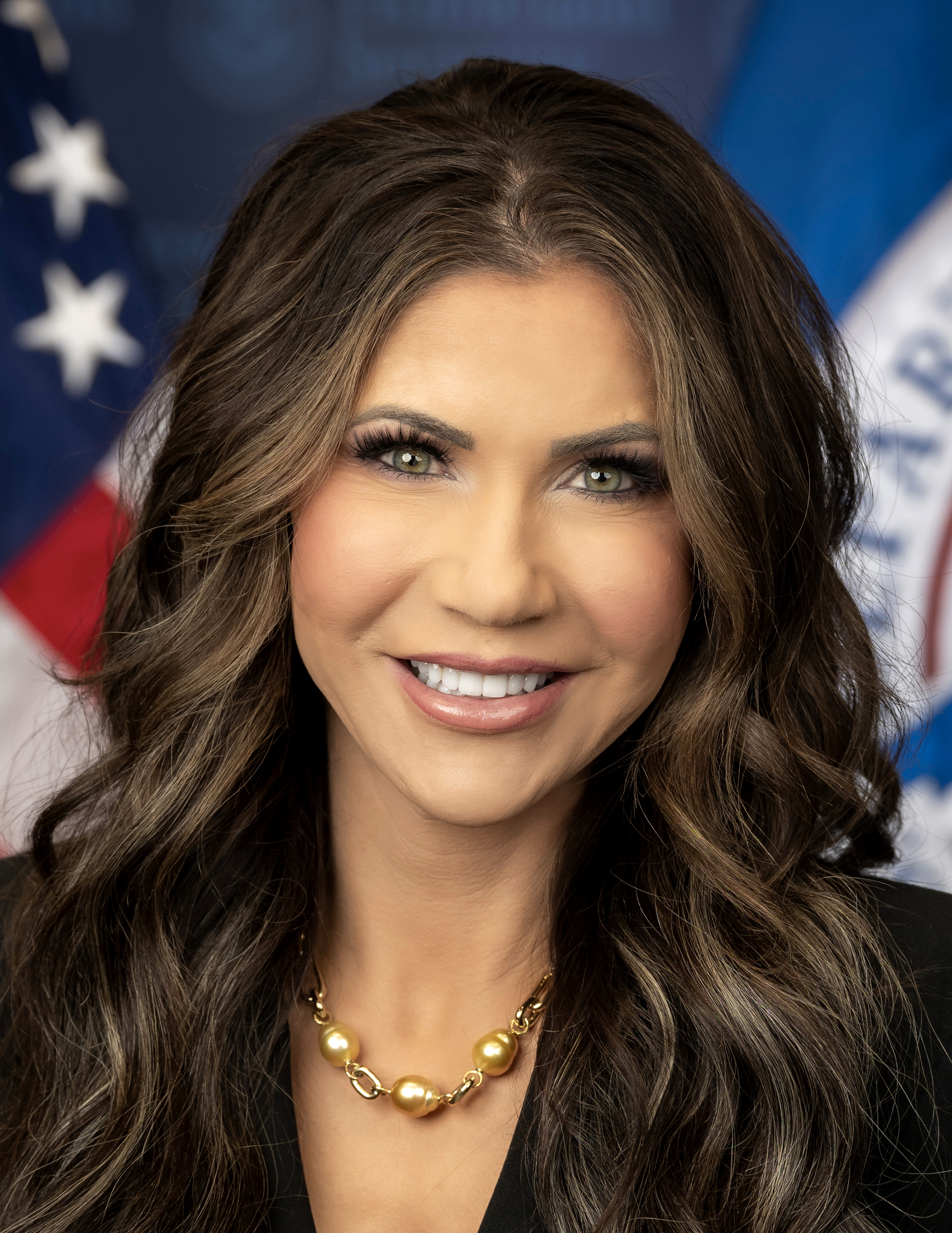
Kristi Noem pictured in 2013 (left) and 2025

Board-certified plastic surgeon Jeffrey Lisiecki characterized the Mar-a-Lago face as "overfilled cheeks that are high and firm, full lips and very taut, smooth skin". Writing for The Guardian, Arwa Mahdawi commented that when the appearance is applied to men, enhancements are applied to the jawline rather than lip size. Mark Epstein, a New York City plastic surgeon, observed an increase in requests in the wake of the attempted assassination of Donald Trump in Pennsylvania. From January 2025 onward, plastic surgeons in the United States Capitol area reported a "surge in 'Mar-a-Lago face' requests from Trump insiders". Axios reported the increase was due to many Floridians moving to the Washington area at the time. Retail doctors in Florida near Mar-a-Lago had begun advertising "Mar-a-Lago face" surgery services, according to Kyunghyang Shinmun.

One cosmetic surgeon listed a brow lift, a face and neck lift, an eyelid lift, a nose job, fat transfer to the face, Botox, injectable filler, neuromodulation, microneedling, facials, chemical peels, laser treatments, "medical-grade skin care products", and dental veneers among the procedures constituting Mar-a-Lago face. Kelly Bolden, a plastic surgeon, reported that those who want a Mar-a-Lago face "have to be able to handle needles" in order to receive "overdone filler and Botox that gives them that mask-face type of appearance". California surgeon Matthew Nykiel estimated the 2025 cost in US dollars to be approximately $90,000 along with upkeep costs of $2,500 per year. Procedures such as Mar-a-Lago face reportedly last 8–10 years before failing and requiring further surgical intervention.

=== Reaction to trend ===
Many of Donald Trump's critics have sought to identify any hypocrisies arising from the ideological proponents of natural health and traditional beliefs about women. Writing in Der Tagesspiegel, Ronja Merkel compares the bodies and physical appearance of the present Trump cabinet and members to the Trumpist version of America First ideology: that those who fail to meet even the artificial image of America are unwelcome. Merkel describes the surgically altered appearances of Trump insiders as "rules, control, and the restoration of a 'natural' hierarchy". Christoph Künne writes in the German magazine Docma that Mar-a-Lago face is not "total disfigurement", quoting a surgeon who described the look as "overdone" and "plastic". El Confidencial noted that the sudden changes of Mar-a-Lago face were similar to rumored "drastic" appearance changes of Spanish politicians José Bono and Albert Rivera, and that more "gradual" rumored appearance changes in politics were preferred, citing examples of José Blanco López and François Mitterrand. Aspects of the Mar-a-Lago face were "catching on in Italy" among media figures, according to Vanity Fair Italia.

Writing for Mother Jones, Inae Oh calls Mar-a-Lago face "gender-affirming care the right can celebrate". She states that Mar-a-Lago face "seems intended to signal membership with Trump" and "force strict gender norms" with a blunt approach. Eva Wiseman in the Otago Daily Times also associates Mar-a-Lago face with gender-affirming care and drag. Daniel Belkin, a New York dermatologist, was quoted in Le Journal de Montréal on comparisons of Mar-a-Lago face to gender-affirming medicine, calling the conservative social trend "interventions to assert their gender, in this case to accentuate their femininity or virility." The president of the Italian Association of Botulinum Aesthetic Therapy, Giovanni Salti, defended the cosmetic and therapeutic medical use of botulinum toxin, noting that a "well-done procedure is noticeable because it goes unnoticed".

The Week describes the trend as "the leader and followers compet[ing] to inject as much unsightliness as possible into the American field of vision". Joan Callarissa, a fashion-and-celebrity journalist, identifies Mar-a-Lago face as an extension of Trump's "counter-revolutionary" movement, saying, "If they have a face they don't like, they change it, without caring if it looks natural or not, because reality does not matter to Trumpism". Ani Wilcenski writes in The Spectator that Mar-a-Lago face represents the "broader Trumpian artifice" and the "national id" of the US. The Chosun Ilbo observed that Mar-a-Lago face is a trend of "noisy facial transformations" among Trump loyalists.

In response to criticism, Sheila Nazarian, a conservative plastic surgeon and host of Skin Decision, criticized the label as a politically motivated attack on conservative women and allies of Trump, rather than a neutral description of cosmetic trends. In USA Today, Nicole Russell said conservative women were victims of "cruel attacks" due to Mar-a-Lago face. According to San Diego State University political science professor Ronnee Schreiber,

"You have these folks who are trying to hyper-feminise the way they look, including using surgical procedures and so on, and yet are critical of people who are trying to express their gender identity in other surgical and medical ways to feel authentic, or to be authentic."

However, Schrieber warned against focusing on the appearance of women involved in politics, but said there was "more to unpack" to the question of why MAGA supporters favored the appearance. Former Trump ally Marjorie Taylor Greene, on the other hand, told The New York Times that "I never liked the MAGA Mar-a-Lago sexualization. I believe how women in leadership present themselves sends a message to younger women." Greene added, "I've always been uncomfortable with how those women puff up their lips and enlarge their breasts."

=== Individuals who have been described as having Mar-a-Lago face ===
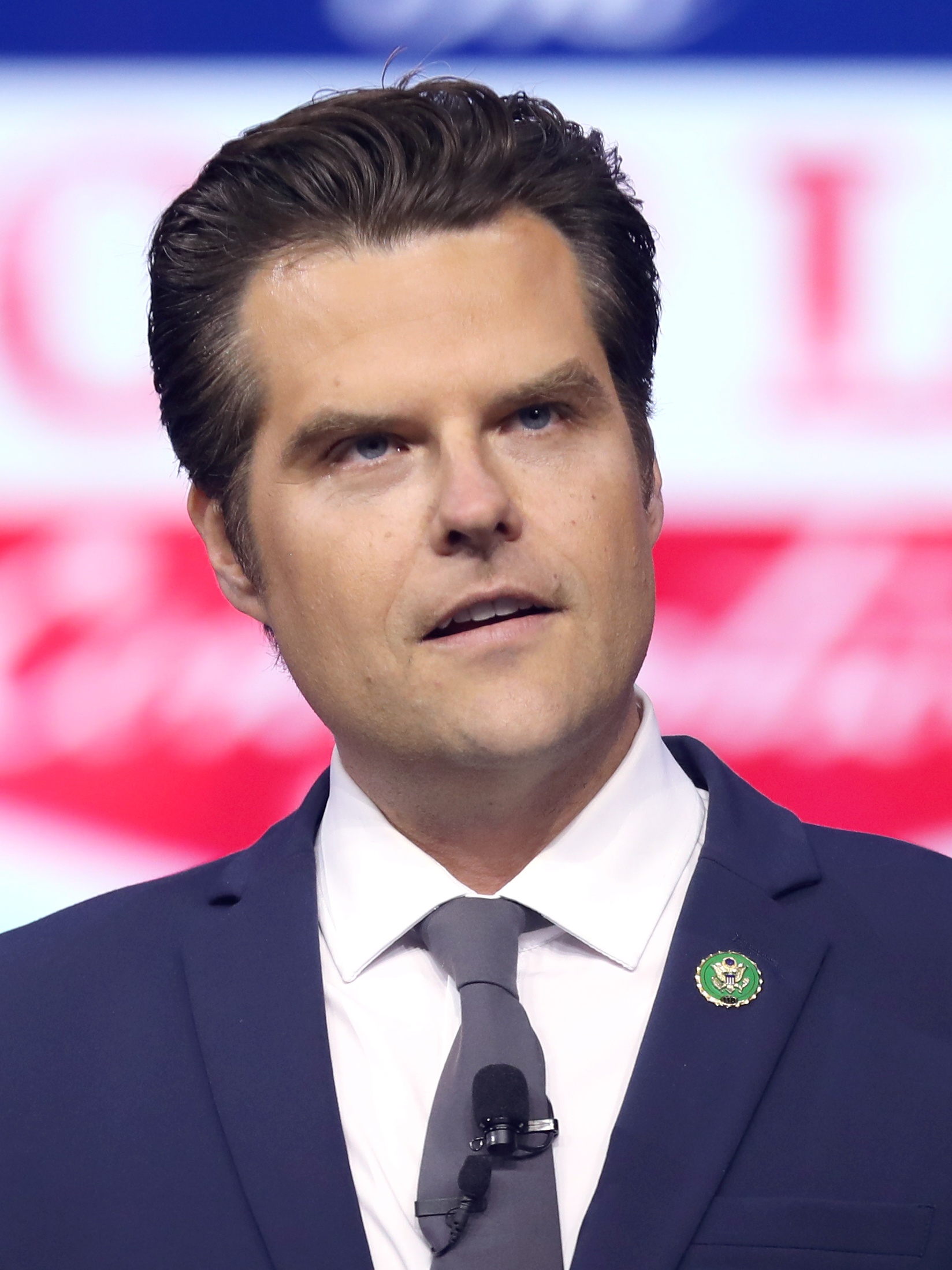
Florida congressman Matt Gaetz is considered an example of a male Mar-a-Lago face.

- Susan Dell, businesswoman, philanthropist, and wife of Michael Dell
- Matt Gaetz, representative from Florida's 1st congressional district (2017–2024) (Note: Attributed to multiple sources:)
- Riley Gaines, activist and former NCAA collegiate swimmer
- Callista Gingrich, ambassador to Switzerland.
- Wayne Gretzky, former ice hockey player
- Kimberly Guilfoyle, former United States Ambassador to Greece (2025–2026) (Note: Attributed to multiple sources:)
- Erika Kirk, widow of Charlie Kirk and CEO of Turning Point USA
- Karoline Leavitt, former White House Press Secretary (2025–2026)
- Kelly Loeffler, current United States Small Business Administrator (2025–present)
- Laura Loomer, conspiracy theorist, far-right political activist, and internet personality (Note: Attributed to multiple sources:)
- Ronna McDaniel, 65th Chair of the Republican National Committee
- Elon Musk, businessman
- Kristi Noem, United States Secretary of Homeland Security (2025–2026) (Note: Attributed to multiple sources:)
- Jeanine Pirro, the United States Attorney for the District of Columbia
- Lauren Sánchez, former journalist and wife of Jeff Bezos
- George Santos, former member of the United States House of Representatives
- Gwen Stefani, singer
- Sydney Sweeney, actress
- Barbera Thornhill, businesswoman and United States Ambassador-at-Large to Monitor and Combat Trafficking in Persons
- Ivanka Trump, businesswoman and daughter of president Donald Trump
- Lara Trump, co-chair of the Republican National Committee (2024–2025) and daughter-in-law of president Donald Trump (Note: Attributed to multiple sources:)
- Melania Trump, First Lady of the United States (2017–2021, 2025–present)
- Carrie Underwood, country musician.
- Katie Zacharia, former White House Press Secretary (2026)

== See also ==
- Blue-haired liberal
- Donald Trump in popular culture
- Pussyhat – Pink cat-ear beanie hat
- Lookism – Discrimination based on physical attractiveness
- 2020s in fashion
