= I've Had It (podcast) =

American political podcast

- Genre: Political; Popular culture
- Language: English

Cast and voices
- Hosted by: Jennifer Welch; Angie "Pumps" Sullivan

Publication
- Original release: October 18, 2022
- Provider: Podcast One
- Updates: Tuesdays and Thursdays

Related
- Website: Official

I've Had It is an American progressive political commentary podcast created in 2022 by hosts Jennifer Welch and Angie "Pumps" Sullivan. Welch and Sullivan, who are from Oklahoma City, previously co-hosted the Bravo series Sweet Home Oklahoma from 2016 to 2019. Initially not focused on politics, I've Had It has been characterized by the hosts' outspoken liberal politics and frequent criticism of Donald Trump since the run-up to the 2024 United States presidential election, as well as their more recent criticism of leadership of the Democratic Party.

== History ==
=== 2022–2024: Beginnings and less-political commentary ===
Jennifer Welch and Angie "Pumps" Sullivan met through their children, who were best friends. The mothers bonded over marital struggles and initially disagreed on political and religious issues. Welch is a longtime Democrat and atheist, whereas Sullivan is a former Republican and Christian who taught Bible study at a megachurch, but experienced a "gradual evolution" away from her faith, which she told Welch about in 2020. Sullivan, an attorney, hired Welch, an interior designer, for a project, and the two became friends. After cohosting the Bravo series Sweet Home Oklahoma from 2016 to 2019, they were persuaded to start a podcast by their children; the pair launched I've Had It in October 2022. Initially, the podcast did not focus upon politics, hoping to entertain their existing fan base of what Welch said was "women our age and a lot of gays" that they had gained from Sweet Home Oklahoma. Subjects included bridezillas, etiquette on Instagram, and the bad behavior of toddlers, while guests included Peloton instructors, drag queens, and cast members of The Real Housewives and The Bachelorette.

=== 2024–present: Politicization ===
It was in the run-up to the 2024 United States presidential election that the podcast began to speak negatively of Donald Trump with frequency. In January 2024, progressive Rep. Alexandria Ocasio-Cortez made an appearance on the podcast after they were pitched to her as "Southern liberals who are strong supporters of underrepresented groups". In April, Kamala Harris made an appearance on the podcast. They were invited to the 2024 Democratic National Convention, as well as to a Los Angeles fundraiser for Joe Biden hosted by George Clooney. Former US President Barack Obama appeared on the podcast in September 2024. During this period, Welch became privately worried that Biden was too old to run for president again, and after Kamala Harris became the nominee that Harris was tacking too far to the political center. She did not speak about these concerns at the time.

In April 2025, Welch responded to Rahm Emanuel's suggestion that members of the Democratic Party should be silent on their support for transgender rights, by calling Emanuel a sellout on the podcast. In June, she called Hakeem Jeffries "one of those corporate Democrats". Elizabeth Warren, New York City mayor Zohran Mamdani, and Bernie Sanders had also guested by September 2025. That month, Welch visited leftist streamer Hasan Piker prior to an event for Kamala Harris's book 107 Days. Following the assassination of Charlie Kirk that month, Welch stated "I oppose gun violence" while characterizing Kirk as "a hate-monger, a racist, a misogynist, and a homophobe who trafficked in cruelty and in culture wars that marginalized people," adding that "the violent nature of his death doesn't change that."

By October 2025, Welch had scaled down her job as an interior designer and Sullivan had left her job as a divorce attorney to focus on the podcast. Welch moved to an apartment in New York City in October 2025 after her children had graduated from high school, with Sullivan planning to follow by the end of the year. The pair criticized political figures who accept funding from AIPAC, a pro-Israel lobby group, particularly Sen. Cory Booker in October that year. Welch pressed Booker on whether he would call Israeli Prime Minister Benjamin Netanyahu a war criminal, which Booker deflected; this resulted in emails of appreciation from two members of Congress and a cancellation of an upcoming appearance by another politician. Welch attended Zohran Mamdani's victory party for his election as mayor in November, and as of that month, the podcast was putting out main episodes twice weekly and a news counterpart, IHIP News, twice daily. The primary podcast starts with a greeting to "Patriots, gaytriots, theytriots, Blacktriots and browntriots".

By February 2026, the podcast had gained over 1 million subscribers on YouTube.

In November 2026, Welch and Sullivan apologized for laughing during the podcast about an online post joking that the body of assassinated political commentator Charlie Kirk be exhumed and shot again. The incident led to backlash and loss of sponsorships for the podcast.

== Reception ==
I've Had It has been noted for its liberal and left-wing political perspective, as well as its profane language. In an interview with David Remnick for The New Yorker Radio Hour, Welch characterized the podcast's style as "Dark Woke". The New York Times has noted that Welch "appeals to the mainstream liberal, angers the Fox News viewer and thrills the dirtbag left". Leftist Twitch streamer Hasan Piker has praised the podcast, calling I've Had It "the most radical progressive podcast in North America" and the "headquarters of the actual resistance—and not the 2016-era resistance liberalism, the real resistance."

=== Awards and nominations ===
Year	Organization	Award	Nominated work	Result	Ref.
2024	iHeartPodcast Awards	Best Pop Culture	I've Had It	Nominated	
2024	iHeartPodcast Awards	Best Emerging	I've Had It	Nominated	
2026	GLAAD Media Awards	Outstanding Podcast Episode	"Straight Panic, Gay Excellence"	Won	
