= Makeup of Donald Trump =

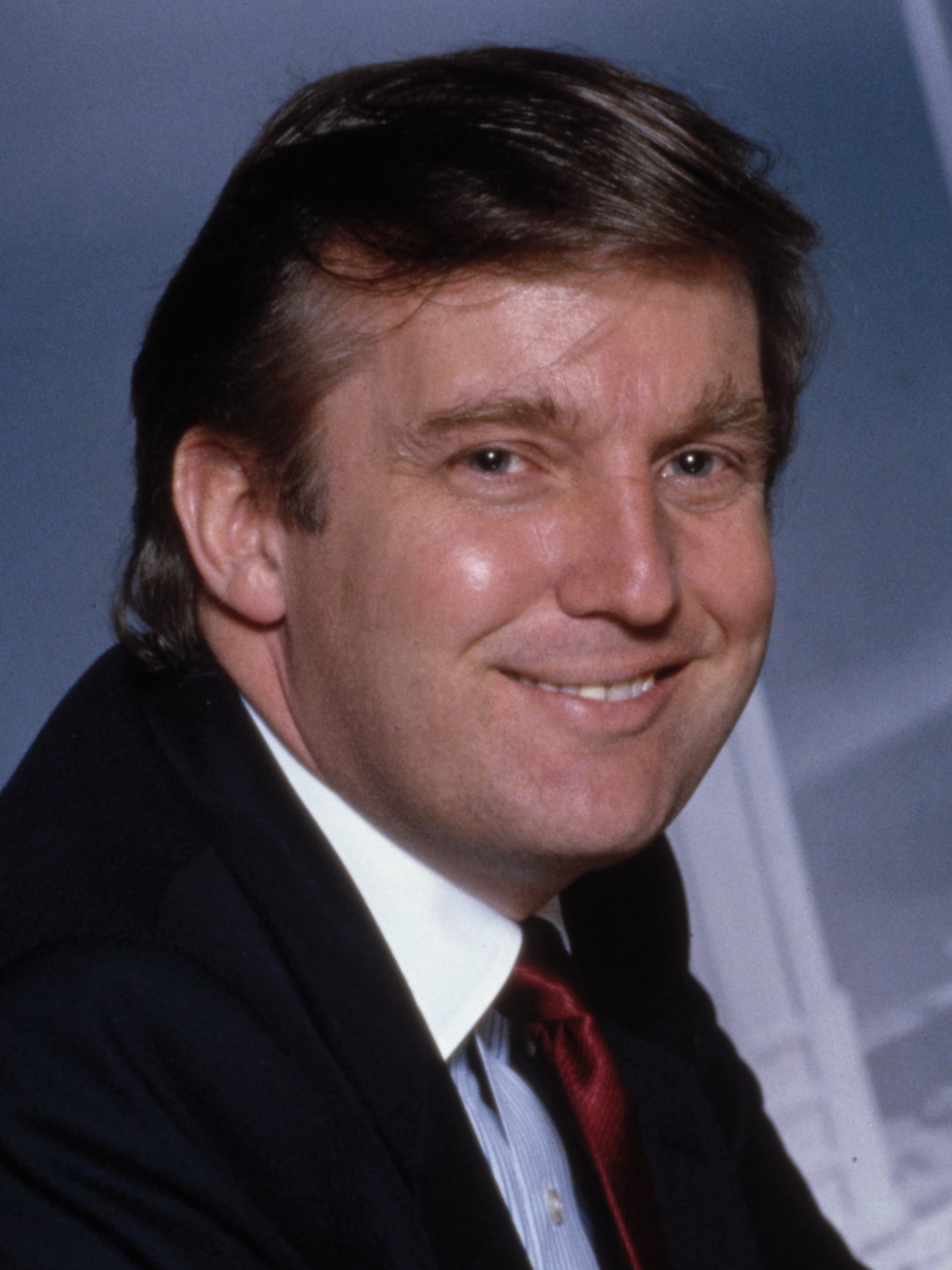
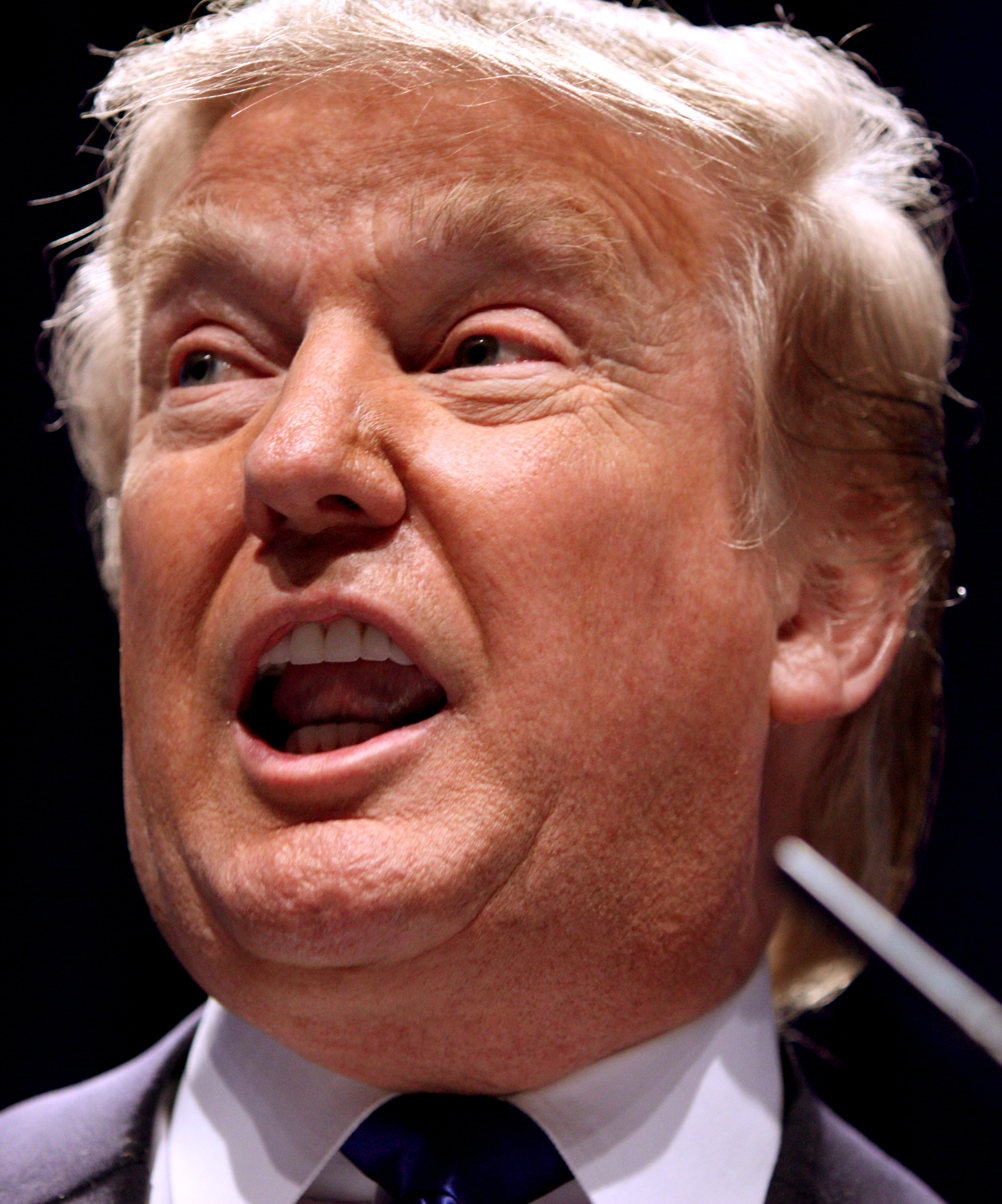
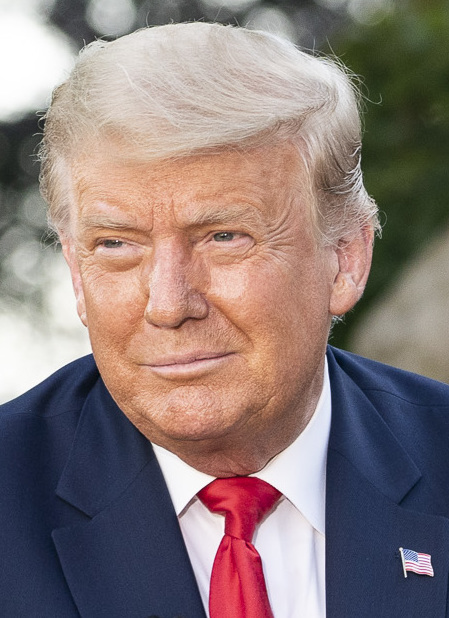
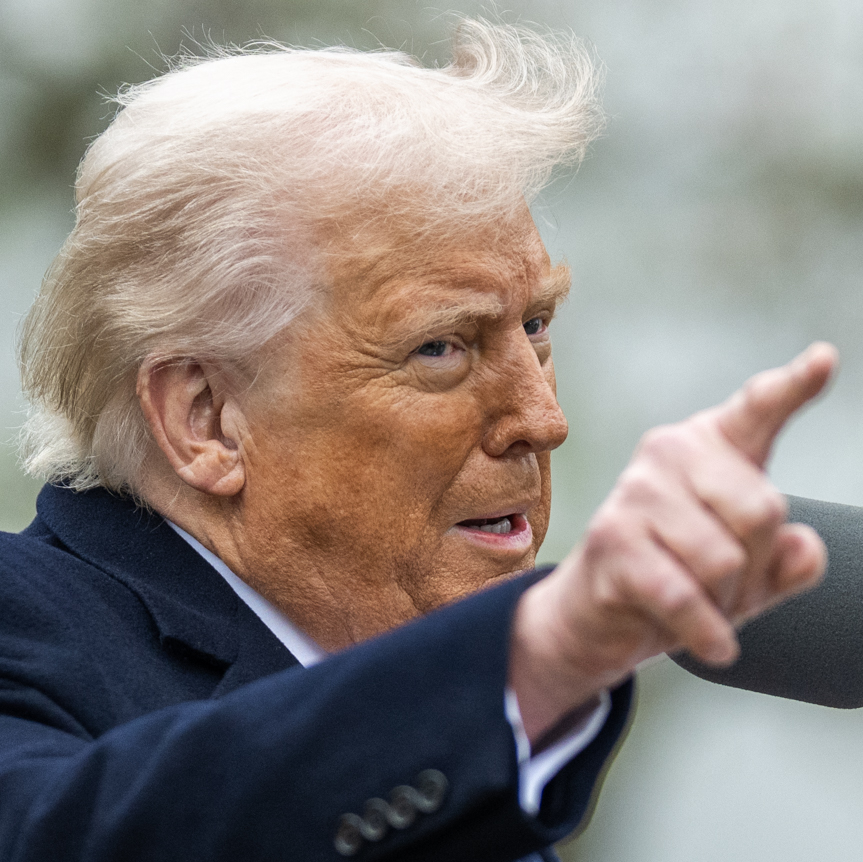
From left to right, top to bottom: Trump in 1985, 2011, 2020, and 2025.

The use of makeup and cosmetics by Donald Trump, the 45th and 47th president of the United States, has been a subject of media coverage since before his entry into electoral politics. He has been reported to apply his own makeup. Suggestions that his hue results from bronzers, self-tanning agents, or tanning devices, have been disputed by White House aides and associates. Trump has publicly complained about appearing "yellow or orange" on television.

== Background ==
Since before the first presidency of Donald Trump, discussion and media scrutiny has focused on Trump's grooming and hygiene habits. Fast Company observed that Trump's familiar hue was present as far back as his television series The Apprentice, which aired from 2004 to 2017. It was reported he appeared more natural until 2012 outside of broadcast appearances, closer to the natural pale complexion of his Scottish and German heritage.

In 2019, The New York Times referred to Trump's coloration as a "conspicuously sun-kissed glow", and that "the president's vibrant hue is so consistently present and meticulously maintained that it was a culturally embedded representation of him long before he entered politics". Some White House staff have stated his coloration was the result of "good genes".

Trump has complained he appears "yellow or orange" on screens. The White House lighting levels were reduced during Trump's occupancy, as he prefers natural light for his presentation. Trump has directed lighting changes at White House events to appear less orange.

Trump's "beauty routine" has been described as "secretive". Some reports claim Trump personally manages his own hair and makeup.

== Makeup claims ==
Trump was first reported to make use of "orange" makeup products as early as 2012. Stephanie Grisham, the former White House Communications Director, White House Press Secretary, press secretary for the first lady and Chief of Staff to the First Lady of the United States confirmed Trump personally applied his own makeup daily. Trump applies his own "translucent makeup powder" before televised appearances.

In 2018, reporting of undocumented immigrants employed by Trump, The New York Times noted an incident where "stubborn remnants" of his makeup were difficult to remove from a golf shirt. The Times again acknowledged a makeup incident involving a golf shirt in 2019, and that it had upset Trump.

Kriss Blevens, a makeup artist who has worked with every United States president since Jimmy Carter, including Trump as recently as 2023, observed that Trump's face was "bronzer" than other portions of his flesh; she surmised he deployed self-tanning agents to reflect his Floridian lifestyle. Makeup had been commented upon in presidential politics since at least the televising of the 1960 Nixon-Kennedy debates. In one makeup session, Trump asked her if he needed "more color", but Blevens dissuaded him, later comparing the incident to a 2017 makeup session with Hillary Clinton where she convinced Clinton to avoid a certain color of lipstick.

Tina Alster, a noted capital region dermatologist, posited that Trump used tanning-related cosmetics, and noted the "telltale" sign of him appearing more "orangey than he does tan". The New York Times reported that Alster had been approached by members of Trump's "orbit" in regard to improving his skin tone; she noted he appeared to have sun damage, but praised him for perhaps abandoning any sun-based tanning habits in favor of cosmetics.

=== Bronx Colors ===
In 2019, the Washington Post published an article that described experiences of undocumented immigrants who worked for Donald Trump and the Trump Organization. Among the reporting was this passage, highlighted by Vox:

The same rule applied to the Bronx Colors-brand face makeup from Switzerland that Trump slathered on — two full containers, one half full — even if it meant the housekeepers had to regularly bring new shirts from the pro shop because of the rust-colored stains on the collars.

Bronx Colors is a makeup cosmetics product from Switzerland. The company, in the wake of media reports of Trump using it, confirmed the reporting discussed their product "Boosting Hydrating Concealer in orange", and offered shoppers a discount on the product afterward. However, Bronx Colors declined to directly confirm if Trump was a customer.

== Tanning bed claims ==
The Washington Post reported that in his youth at New York Military Academy, Trump was known for using ultraviolet bulbs in his room, and would say, "we're going to the beach".

Former Trump assistant Omarosa Manigault Newman claimed Trump was orange due to a tanning bed; the White House denied this. In Manigault's book, Unhinged: An Insider's Account of the Trump White House, she alleged that Trump fired Angella Reid, the White House Chief Usher, for mishandling the delivery of his tanning bed to the White House in May 2017. Trump was critical of Manigault for her disclosures.

In a 2017 interview with Vanity Fair, makeup artist Victoria Stiles theorized Trump's hue may be due to a tanning bed, comparing the uncolored areas around his eyes to goggles used to protect the eyes in such devices. James Comey, former director of the Federal Bureau of Investigation, described Trump as "slightly orange" and assumed the "bright white half-moons under his eyes" were due to tanning bed usage.

The New York Times reported that multiple Trump administration officials denied any tanning bed existed within the East Wing or aboard Air Force One. Grisham stated that the White House had no tanning bed during her tenure.

== Skin health and hand makeup ==
Trump has rosacea. Due to his rosacea, which he takes antibiotics to manage, he is "attentive" to his public appearance.

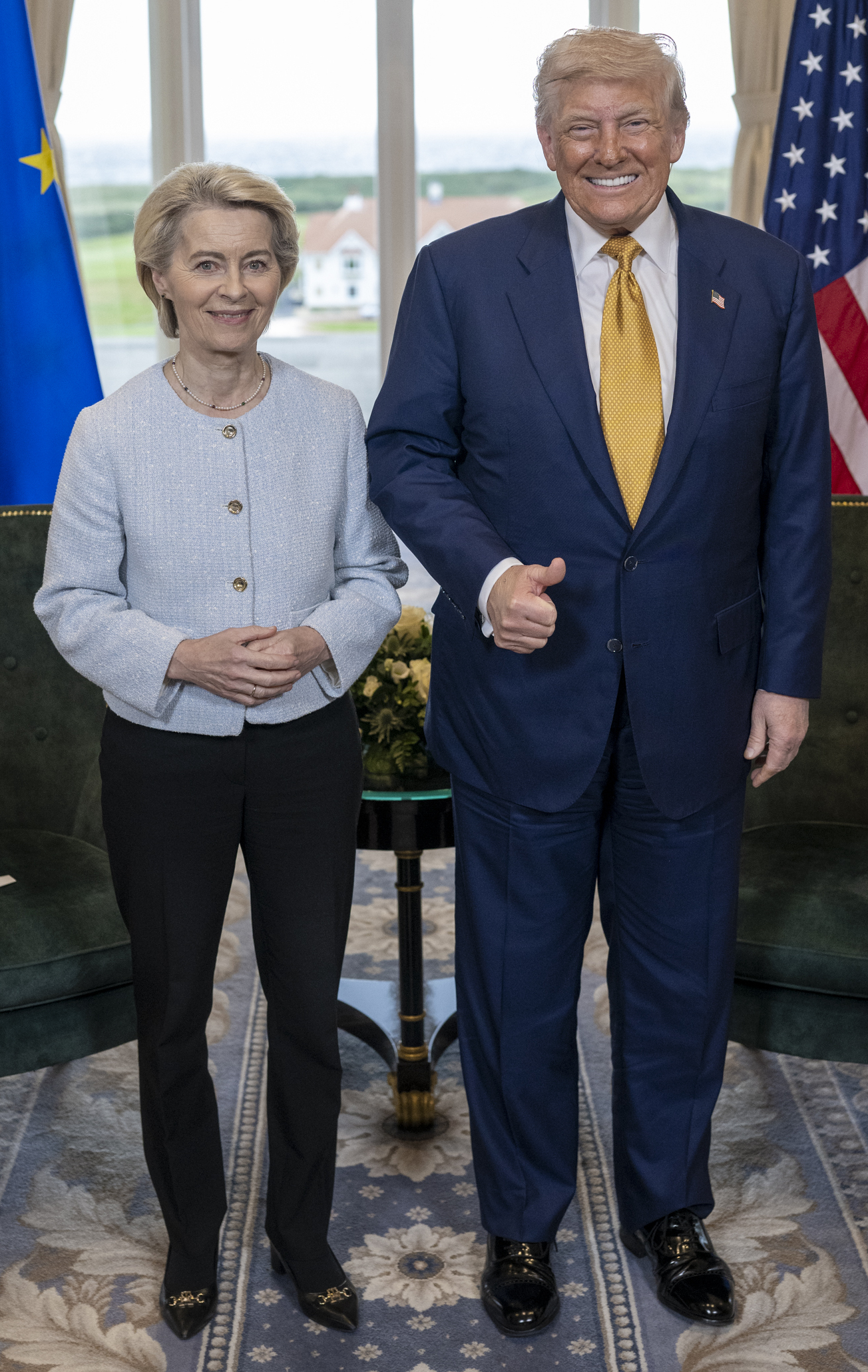
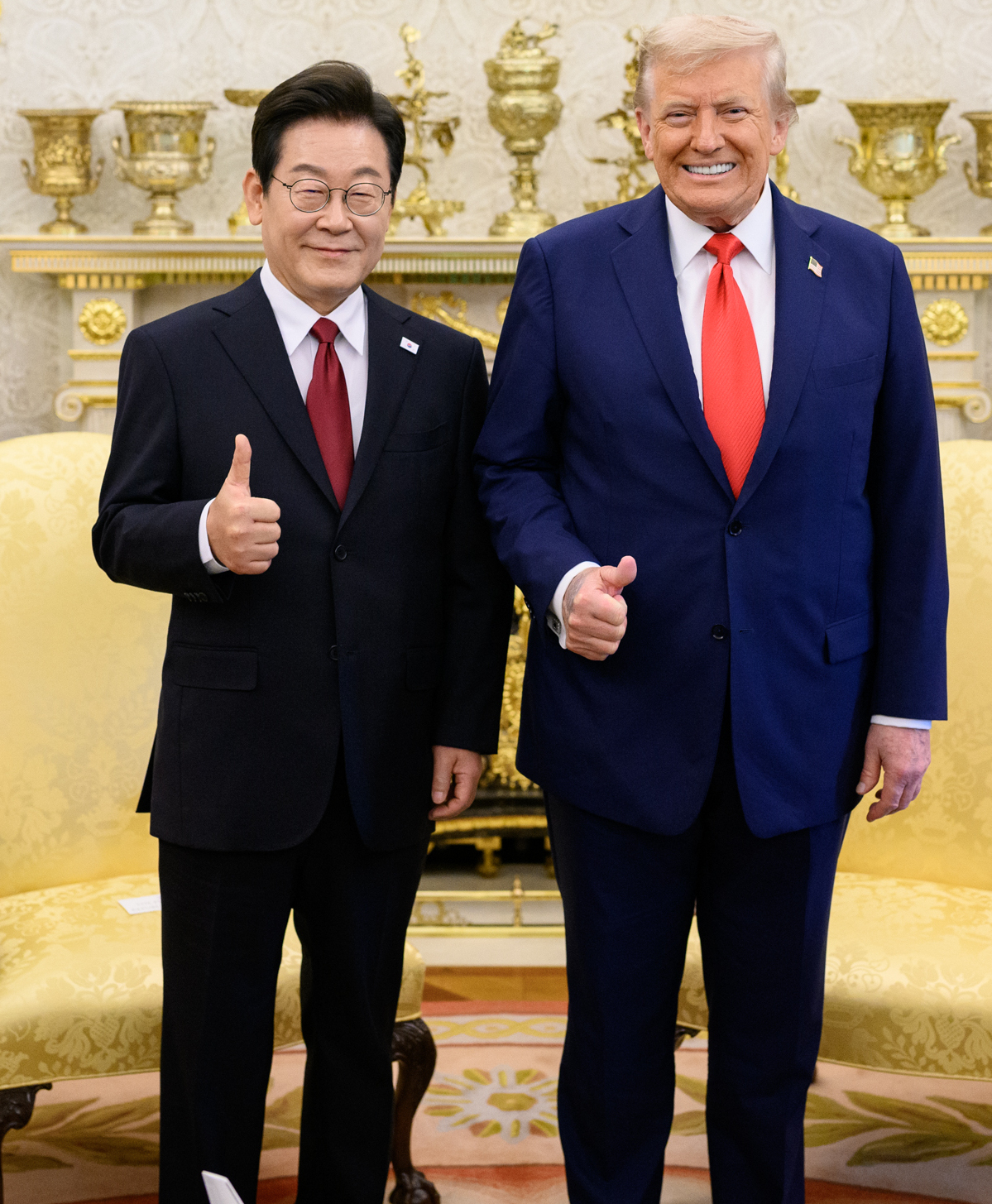
Trump on July 27, 2025, (left) and on August 25, 2025 (right)

On July 17, 2025, the White House announced that Trump had what they called chronic venous insufficiency. On August 22, 2025, The Daily Beast described Trump as having worn a "thick layer of makeup", and noted that he had used this multiple times on his hand since January 2025. The White House suggested that Trump's hand bruises were due to his high daily aspirin intake and "frequent handshaking", and emphasized that there was no underlying health issue.

During a meeting with Ursula von der Leyen, the president of the European Commission, Trump visibly wore hand makeup on July 27. USA Today discussed Trump's makeup in August 2025, noting that he wore "light foundation makeup" on the back of his right hand on the 22nd. They reported that his hand was visibly bruised in the same place on the 25th during a meeting with South Korean president Lee Jae Myung.

In an interview about his health with The Wall Street Journal published in January 2026, Trump addressed the bruising and hand makeup. He stated that he took a high dose of aspirin daily, which causes him to bruise easily, and that he applies makeup after getting "whacked again by someone", referencing incidents such as a high five that had resulted in bruising. He described the makeup as "easy to put on, [it] takes about 10 seconds".

== Analysis ==
Trump's preferred appearance of makeup cosmetics has been called an "orange hue". His coloration has been a subject of ridicule in the media.

In the LA Review of Books, Allison Coffelt characterized Trump's skin coloration as a "perversion of indicators of youth and health". Alice Bolin, writing for Racked in 2016, observed that "deviance from gender norms is not 'presidential'", but that Trump had managed to avoid expectations of gender normality.

When Alec Baldwin impersonated Trump on Saturday Night Live, he requested the orange color be restrained; this was due to a request from Lorne Michaels to "not to over-orange anything out of malice". Baldwin compared Trump's makeup coloration to both a "Mark Rothko orange" and "slightly paler Orange Crush".

Jason Kelly, who worked at the 2016 Republican National Convention as a makeup artist, in 2016 attributed Trump's coloration to "the tanning bed, the spray tan, he wears the goggles and you can see the hyper-pigmentation around his eyes". The director of airbrush design at Beach Bum Tanning believed Trump is likely using the wrong shade of makeup for his skin, applied incorrectly.

In 2016, Fast Company addressed the question of what Trump's values are under the cosmetics Pantone Color Matching System. Fast Company later reported that multiple experts in matters of political image consulting and cosmetics noted Trump's "saturation" peaked in 2020, and that his skin appeared more natural from the CNN Republican Town Hall with Donald Trump in May 2023 through to the attempted assassination of Trump in July 2024. Some experts stated that Trump's modern coloration is closer to that of Joe Biden, and that the newer appearance was more favorable.

Film industry makeup artist Brandi Boulet discussed with The Hollywood Reporter the challenges of having actor Sebastian Stan resemble Trump's makeup preferences in the 2024 film The Apprentice, and their reliance on archival media from Trump's earlier life.

== See also ==
- Donald Trump in popular culture
- Beauty trends among American conservatives, associated with Trump's supporters
