= Monarch School, Montana =

Defunct therapeutic boarding school in Montana, United States

Location
- 16 Aspen Lane; Heron, Montana 59844; United States; 48.062°N 116.006°W

Information
- Motto: education for life
- Established: 2000
- Founder: Patrick McKenna
- Closed: 2017
- CEEB code: 270464
- Age range: 15 to 17

Monarch School was a year round, co-ed therapeutic boarding school located in Heron, Montana. It closed in September 2017, with its owners citing unsustainable student enrollment as the primary reason.

== History ==
Monarch School, INC was incorporated in Idaho by founder Patrick McKenna in September 2000. According to the mission statement, "The Monarch School exists to provide young adults with the foundation of knowledge and self-awareness to achieve their dreams as healthy human beings".

As the school did not have an official campus when it opened, McKenna ran the school out of his Sandpoint home. In late 2001, students moved from the Mckenna residence onto the Monarch campus in Heron, Montana.

The campus comprised several small dormitories in separate houses, classroom buildings, an arts center, a theater building, an administrative and dining facility, a horse barn and riding hall, a chicken coop, a greenhouse, and extensive grounds.

The curriculum was divided into periods of academic studies, practical skills development (cooking, forestry, gardening, animal care, etc.), chores, and recreation. Personal electronics were not allowed, although students used computers for some of their academic work. Face-to-face interaction, reading, and physical activity were encouraged instead.

In 2014, a student tried to commit suicide. The Monarch School has been accused of abuse and neglect by former students, including Paris Hilton, and is considered to be reflective of the troubled teen industry. A TrueAnon series on the history of Synanon recounted Brace Belden's experiences at the Monarch School and described Patrick McKenna as a disciple of Synanon, with the school mimicking CEDU's practices. After its closure, the school also settled lawsuits from parents that claimed malpractice, fraud, and breach of contract.

=== Admissions ===
Monarch School offered year-round enrollment, and the cost of tuition was a "flat monthly tuition rate of $7000." Partial financial aid was granted in many cases.

== Notable alumni ==
- Brace Belden

== See also ==
- CEDU
