= Brace Belden =

American podcaster and union organizer

- Born: October 13, 1989 (age 37); San Francisco, California, U.S.
- Military career
- Allegiance: Rojava
- Branch: People's Protection Units; United Freedom Forces
- Service years: 2016–2017
- Nicknames: "Bad Boy" Brace Belden; PissPigGranddad; PissPigGrandma; President Chaos
- Conflicts: Syrian Civil War; Raqqa campaign

Brace Robert Belden (born October 13, 1989) is an American podcaster, union activist, and former volunteer fighter who served with the People's Protection Units (YPG), a Kurdish militia, during the Syrian Civil War from 2016 to 2017. He is best known for co-hosting the popular left-wing podcast TrueAnon with Liz Franczak, which focuses on political conspiracies and elite power structures.

Belden gained initial notoriety through his Twitter account @PissPigGranddad, where he documented his experiences fighting ISIS alongside Kurdish forces. After returning to the United States, he became a prominent labor organizer, helping establish the first craft brewery union in U.S. history at Anchor Brewing Company in 2019.

== Early life and background ==
Belden was born in San Francisco and grew up in Corte Madera, California. He is Jewish and comes from a middle-class family; his father works as a journalist at a local television station and his brother works in technology. When Belden was six years old, his mother died by suicide.

Belden has said he was "a troubled teen". He attended five different high schools, including Monarch School, a boot camp he ran away from before being arrested for public intoxication in Mission Dolores Park.

=== Political development ===
Belden has identified as a Marxist since his teenage years and protested the Iraq War when he was 13. In 2005, when he was 15, he and his friends started a satirical right-wing, pro-war punk band called Warkrime, where Belden performed under the stage name President Chaos. The band released its first album, Give War A Chance, in 2006, and broke up in 2008. After Warkrime disbanded, Belden played bass in Wild Thing, another San Francisco-based punk band, adopting the nickname "'Bad Boy' Brace Belden".

=== Early career ===
Belden has said that after graduating from high school he "always worked shitty jobs" and "should have gone to college", with the caveat "but a lot of good that did other guys". He worked as a florist at Brothers Papadopoulos flower shop in the San Francisco Bay Area.

In 2015, he launched a petition to cancel A Prairie Home Companion, a radio show by American Public Media. The petition said it "is a dumb boring show that forces millions of radio listeners under 60 to turn off their radios whenever that stupid old guy starts his rambling crap. All people under like 100 years old should sign this." Willamette Week talked to Belden about his campaign before deciding to hire him as a freelance music writer.

In September 2016, Willamette Week received a resignation email from Belden saying he had "accepted a position out of the country."

== Syrian Civil War (2016–2017) ==
Belden arrived in Syria in October 2016. He underwent training at the YPG's Academy, where he met other Western volunteers, including Lucas Chapman and Tommy Mørck. Shortly after graduating from the Academy, Belden was assigned as a machine gunner on a makeshift tank for the Raqqa campaign. His unit helped capture Tal Saman in the Raqqa Subdistrict in mid-November. Brace said, "We pushed up to Tal Saman till we had it surrounded on a half circle. Then we just bombarded the shit out of it." Many refugees fled the town and sought protection behind the YPG front line, with Belden describing "hundreds of civilians coming across for days in a row." At night, his unit stayed in whatever building it had just captured and camped out on rooftops in the cold. "The first week we were out it was awful", Belden told Rolling Stone. After capturing Tal Saman, Belden's unit was withdrawn to Ayn Issa. Belden later joined the United Freedom Forces.

=== Media attention ===
In March 2017, while still serving in Syria, Belden was nominated as a candidate for Rector of the University of Glasgow. The campaign was backed by left-wing student groups, including the Glasgow Marxists and Glasgow University Labour Club, who promoted him as an example of international solidarity against fascism. His candidacy generated significant controversy, particularly given the presence of other polarizing candidates, including far-right provocateur Milo Yiannopoulos and Canadian professor Jordan Peterson.

In the election held on 20–21 March 2017, Belden finished seventh out of ten candidates with 236 votes. The election was won by human rights lawyer Aamer Anwar, who received 4,458 votes on the first ballot under the single transferable vote system.

Belden was among seven Western leftist volunteers profiled in Rolling Stone in 2017. He was dismissive of the media attention, calling the experience "pretty fucking ridiculous, man. They just kind of made up my biography. Which is tight, because I've literally done nothing in my life but jack off before I came here." The profile generated significant interest in Hollywood, and it was later announced that the Rolling Stone article would be adapted into a film starring Jake Gyllenhaal and directed by Daniel Espinosa. Belden publicly opposed the film adaptation.

== Return to the United States ==
=== Twitter prominence and suspension ===
Using the handle @PissPigGranddad, Belden generated a significant Twitter following while in Syria. By the time he returned, he had around 30,000 followers. The account was permanently suspended shortly after Belden's return to the United States for violating Twitter's policies on "targeted abuse or harassment." Twitter did not comment on the suspension, but the account was locked shortly after Belden mocked white nationalist Nathan Damigo's short stature; according to Belden, "alt-right"-affiliated accounts (or, in Belden's words, "a bunch of Nazis/4chan dudes who were mad at me for making fun of that guy for being short") had tweeted about plans to report @PissPigGranddad en masse. Belden reemerged on Twitter under the new handle @PissPigGrandma, which was also suspended.

Because of his widespread following and familiarity to Twitter users, "PissPigGranddad" has been widely used to refer to Belden in the press and real-life encounters with Belden. Of the "pseudo-celebrity" he acquired under that name, Belden said: "I kind of wish I hadn't made my name PissPigGranddad. I picked it before I ever thought anyone would say it to me out loud."

=== Union organizing ===
In February 2018, Belden began working at Anchor Brewing Company in San Francisco, which had recently been purchased by Sapporo. Working conditions had deteriorated under the new ownership, with wages stagnating while living costs in San Francisco continued to rise. Many workers, including Belden, were kept to 29-hour work weeks so that the company would not have to give them healthcare benefits.

As a member of the Democratic Socialists of America, specifically the local Marxist Red Star Caucus, Belden became part of an eight-person organizing committee to form an employees' union. Belden co-founded and named the Red Star DSA caucus, which was started in his house. The effort was supported by DSA San Francisco's Labor Organizing Committee, which provided training and strategic assistance. The workers chose to affiliate with the International Longshore and Warehouse Union (ILWU) Local 6, attracted by its democratic traditions and militant history.

The unionization effort went public in February 2019 when 39 workers signed a letter announcing their intent to join the ILWU. By early 2019, the campaign had gained significant media attention and was profiled in Jacobin magazine and on Chapo Trap House.

On 13 March 2019, production workers at the brewery voted 31 to 16 to unionize, with service workers at Anchor Public Taps voting 6 to 2 two days later. This made Anchor Brewing the first U.S. craft brewery to unionize from within. In December 2019, workers ratified their first contract by a vote of 49 to 3, securing an average 8% wage increase, improved healthcare coverage, and enhanced benefits for part-time workers. In August 2019, Senator Bernie Sanders spoke with Belden and other union activists about workplace democracy and labor issues.

Negotiations for the union's second agreement stalled in 2023, with the company delaying talks despite the union's early requests to begin them. In July 2023, Sapporo announced that Anchor Brewing would cease operations and liquidated the business, citing declining sales and increased competition. Afterward, former union members led efforts to establish a worker-owned cooperative to purchase the brewery, but were unsuccessful. Chobani founder Hamdi Ulukaya bought the brewery in May 2024. As of 2025, operations had not resumed.

=== Government investigation ===
In August 2020, it was revealed that the Department of Homeland Security had conducted an investigation into Belden and other American volunteers who fought with Kurdish forces in Syria. The investigation was detailed in a leaked intelligence report titled "The Syrian Conflict and Its Nexus to the U.S.-based Antifascist Movement," which was obtained by journalist Ken Klippenstein and published in The Nation.

The report, dated 14 July 2020 and marked "For Official Use Only" and "Law Enforcement Sensitive," was compiled by DHS's Intelligence & Analysis Office in coordination with U.S. Customs and Border Protection's National Targeting Center. The investigation began in June 2020, two weeks after President Donald Trump promised to designate Antifa as a terrorist organization, and coincided with escalating protests in Portland, Oregon.

The report included detailed personal information about Belden and at least six other Americans who had volunteered with Kurdish forces, including their Social Security numbers, home addresses, and social media accounts. According to the document, Belden was "encountered" by border officials on 8 April 2017 when he arrived in San Francisco from Frankfurt, Germany, returning from his service with the YPG. The report called him "a minor criminal and drug addict who started reading Marx and Lenin in drug rehabilitation treatment," largely drawing information from the 2017 Rolling Stone article about American volunteers in Syria.

The investigation sought to establish connections between Antifa ideology and what the report termed "Kurdish democratic federalism teachings," though the evidence presented was largely circumstantial. DHS defined Antifa broadly to encompass "anti-capitalism, communism, socialism, and anarchism". In some cases, alleged Antifa affiliation was based solely on photographs taken in front of Antifa flags. Former DHS officials criticized the investigation's methodology, with one telling The Nation: "They targeted Americans like they're Al-Qaeda. They essentially were violating people's rights like this was the 60's."

In response to the revelations, Belden denied any affiliation with Antifa, saying: "I am not now nor have I ever been a member of any antifa organization." He also criticized the investigation's characterization of his political beliefs: "The US government has been spying on and smearing communists for 100 years but they usually have the decency not to call a Red an anarchist!" The report's publication highlighted broader concerns about domestic surveillance and the targeting of Americans who had legally volunteered to fight alongside U.S.-backed Kurdish forces against ISIS.

== Podcasting career ==
In July 2019, Belden co-founded the podcast TrueAnon with writer Liz Franczak. The podcast was conceived after Jeffrey Epstein's arrest, when Belden and Franczak observed that mainstream media coverage largely ignored significant aspects of the case, including Epstein's alleged connections to U.S. intelligence agencies. The first episode was released on 23 July 2019.

Branding itself as "the only anti-pedophile podcast," TrueAnon combines elements of true crime investigation with left-wing political analysis. The podcast's title is a satirical reference to the QAnon conspiracy theory. While initially focused on the Epstein case, the show has expanded to cover broader topics including human trafficking, finance, Silicon Valley, academia, and what the hosts describe as "power structures" within elite circles.

The podcast has gained significant popularity and critical acclaim. GQ praised its "one-of-a-kind flair" and research quality. Journalist Jeet Heer cited it as one of the few left-wing outlets to examine the Epstein case in detail. By 2025, TrueAnon had become one of the most popular podcasts on Patreon and the 12th-highest creator by subscriber count. Notable guests have included Epstein accuser Maria Farmer, journalist Ken Klippenstein, author William T. Vollmann, and musician Azealia Banks.

== See also ==
- TrueAnon – Podcast co-hosted by Belden
