= Barrett Adair =

American political content creator

- Occupations: Political commentator; Activist; TikToker
- Political party: Democratic

Instagram information
- Page: Barrett Adair
- Genre: Politics
- Followers: 176,000

TikTok information
- Page: barrett.adair
- Followers: 223,800
- Last updated: November 6, 2026

Barrett Adair is an American political activist and social media content creator.

== Career ==
Adair works in progressive politics and in 2017 she was a political advocate in Virginia. She was hired by a Democratic think tank and advocacy group and collaborates with political social media influencers to create content about Capitol Hill happenings and current events. She produces content on Instagram, TikTok, and YouTube.

In 2022, Adair and Carter Leigh co-founded a popular Instagram meme account known as "Hellicity Merriman", named after the American Revolutionary War-era American Girl doll Felicity Merriman. In 2024, following a presidential debate between Joe Biden and Donald Trump, Adair and Leigh launched an Instagram channel called American Girls. Through these accounts, they covered political news including President Joe Biden dropping out of the 2024 United States presidential election, the attempted assassination of Donald Trump in Pennsylvania, and the overturning of Roe v. Wade.

In 2026, Adair co-moderated a panel, alongside Suzanne Lambert, Aaron Parnas, and Ishaia Martin, that was part of the Embassy of Italy in Washington, D.C.'s Digital Diplomacy Series.

== Personal life ==
Adair is originally from Searcy, Arkansas. She lives in Washington, D.C.
