= Suzanne Lambert =

American internet personality and comedian

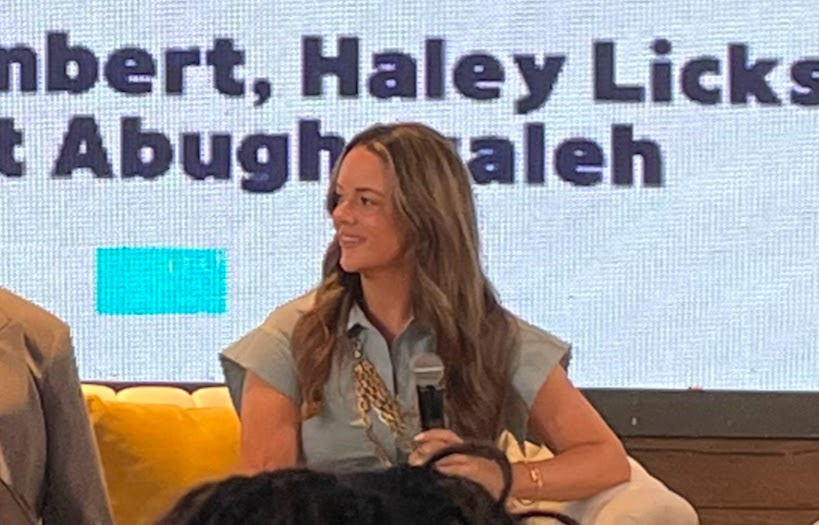
- Lambert at the Voters of Tomorrow Summit in 2025
- Born: November 12, 1991 (age 34)
- Education: University of Georgia (BA)
- Occupations: Internet personality; Comedian; Political commentator; Podcaster
- Political party: Republican (formerly); Democratic

Instagram information
- Page: itssuzannelambert
- Followers: 518,000

TikTok information
- Page: itssuzannelambert
- Followers: 911,500
- Last updated: November 6, 2026
- Website: itssuzannelambert.com

Suzanne Lambert (born November 12, 1991) is an American social media personality, political commentator, podcaster, and comedian. As a Democratic content creator, Lambert is known as the "Regina George liberal" for her videos on TikTok that make fun of Republican politicians and content creators, which has been described as "Dark Woke" content.

== Early life and education ==
Lambert was born on November 12, 1991. She grew up in Kennesaw, Georgia and was raised in a conservative, Irish Catholic family. Her stepfather is a former Catholic priest who was laicized in order to marry her mother. Lambert served as president of her high school's Young Republicans club. She has described Kennesaw as a strongly conservative town in which she was immersed in a white evangelical Christian worldview that she fully embraced while growing up.

Lambert graduated from the University of Georgia in 2014 with a degree in communications. While in college, she joined Kappa Delta sorority and wrote for The Red & Black. She was also a member of the University of Georgia's College Republicans and campaigned for Mitt Romney during the 2012 United States presidential election.

== Career ==
Lambert is a stand-up comedian and social media content creator. She went viral for posting videos on TikTok where she called out conservative women and political figures. In one of her series, where she made fun of "Republican makeup", she called out U.S Congresswoman Nancy Mace of South Carolina, calling her actions in Washington a "very cringe act of political theater" and criticized her for transphobia and poor policies. Lambert received criticism and backlash from conservatives for her content, earning her the nickname "Regina George liberal" and "Mean Girl Liberal", references to the fictional character Regina George from the 2004 American film Mean Girls. She has been described as a "Dark Woke" content creator due to her direct, aggressive style in responding to conservative politics and talking points. In May 2025, Lambert exposed David Blair, conservative political consultant and member of the Make America Great Again movement, for attempting to infiltrate a conference for liberal content creators of which she served as a cohost.

In 2026, Lambert co-moderated a panel, alongside Barrett Adair, Aaron Parnas, and Ishaia Martin, that was part of the Embassy of Italy in Washington, D.C.'s Digital Diplomacy Series.

Along with her YouTube, Instagram, Facebook, and TikTok content, Lambert hosts the podcast Mean But True with Suzanne Lambert.

== Personal life ==
Lambert is a former Republican who is now a registered Democrat. She has said her political outlook began to change after she graduated from college and moved beyond the social circle she had grown up in, crediting her deepening interest in stand-up comedy with leading her to question the beliefs she had been raised with. She has also recalled having once viewed members of the Democratic Party through a regional stereotype, perceiving them as condescending toward Southerners.

She splits her time between Washington, D.C. and Tampa, Florida.
