= TrueAnon =

American politics podcast

- Genre: Politics (left-wing populism, Marxism); comedy; true crime

Cast and voices
- Hosted by: Brace Belden; Liz Franczak

Music
- Opening theme: "You'd Never Guess" by Yung Chomsky
- Composed by: Yung Chomsky, Angelo Badalamenti

Production
- Production: Yung Chomsky
- Length: 90–120 minutes

Publication
- Original release: July 23, 2019; 7 years ago
- Updates: Twice-weekly

Related
- Website: trueanon.com

TrueAnon is a Left-wing American politics and true crime podcast hosted by Brace Belden and Liz Franczak. The podcast initially focused on the deceased financier and convicted sex offender Jeffrey Epstein. Associated with the dirtbag left, the show's title is a parody of the far-right QAnon conspiracy theory. Operating from an anti-establishment standpoint that is highly critical of mainstream liberalism, the podcast rejects partisan framing in favor of a Marxist class analysis to evaluate global power structures and deep-state operations.

== History and content ==
TrueAnon is hosted by Brace Belden, a left-wing internet personality notable for fighting with the People's Protection Units in the Syrian civil war, and Liz Franczak. It is produced by Steven Goldberg under the pseudonym Yung Chomsky. Belden and Franczak met in the early 2000s in San Francisco's punk music scene. The hosts, who identify as Marxists, developed an interest in Epstein's case after Gawker published the contents of Epstein's personal address book in 2015, which established Epstein's connections to multiple influential figures in politics, finance, intelligence, academia, and entertainment.

After Epstein's arrest in July 2019, Belden and Franczak noted how many of the details of the Epstein case, such as his connections to U.S. intelligence agencies, were not covered in the mainstream press. TrueAnon was conceived to explore how "the fascination with Epstein is part of a larger story about the rot at the heart of the global elite" and how this reveals "larger class antagonisms within the United States."

The first episode of TrueAnon was released on July 23, 2019. Calling itself "the only non-pedophile podcast", TrueAnon combines elements of the true crime genre and the dirtbag left, the rhetorical style most closely associated with Chapo Trap House defined by "subversive, populist vulgarity". In addition to Epstein, TrueAnon devotes analysis and discussion to topics such as human trafficking, Medicare for All, Silicon Valley, academia, finance, and nonprofit organizations. It covers material that has been called conspiracy theories, but Belden and Franczak say it engages in historical materialism, focusing on "the power structures that produced Epstein in the first place" rather than a "fixed theory of Epstein's death". Notable guests who have appeared on the podcast include Epstein accuser Maria Farmer, journalist Ken Klippenstein, author William T. Vollmann, and musician Azealia Banks.

In 2021 the podcast covered the Ghislaine Maxwell trial daily from the courtroom, summarizing and discussing the day's events in an episode for each day of the trial.

In January 2024, TrueAnon released a board game satirizing the January 6 United States Capitol attack. A now retracted article in The Independent erroneously called the podcast "right-wing".

== Reception ==
TrueAnon has been favorably received by critics. GQ wrote that it has a "one-of-a-kind flair you won't get anywhere else", praising the quality of its research. Journalist Jeet Heer cited TrueAnon as one of the few left-wing outlets to discuss the Epstein case in detail, compared to "the reluctance of the mainstream media to tackle the topic for fear of seeming conspiratorial". Journalist Glenn Greenwald has also praised the podcast and its coverage of the 2016 Nevada caucus.

As of May 2026, TrueAnon is the 7th-ranked creator on Patreon by number of paid subscribers.

== See also ==
- "Epstein didn't kill himself"
