= Aaron Parnas =

American social media journalist

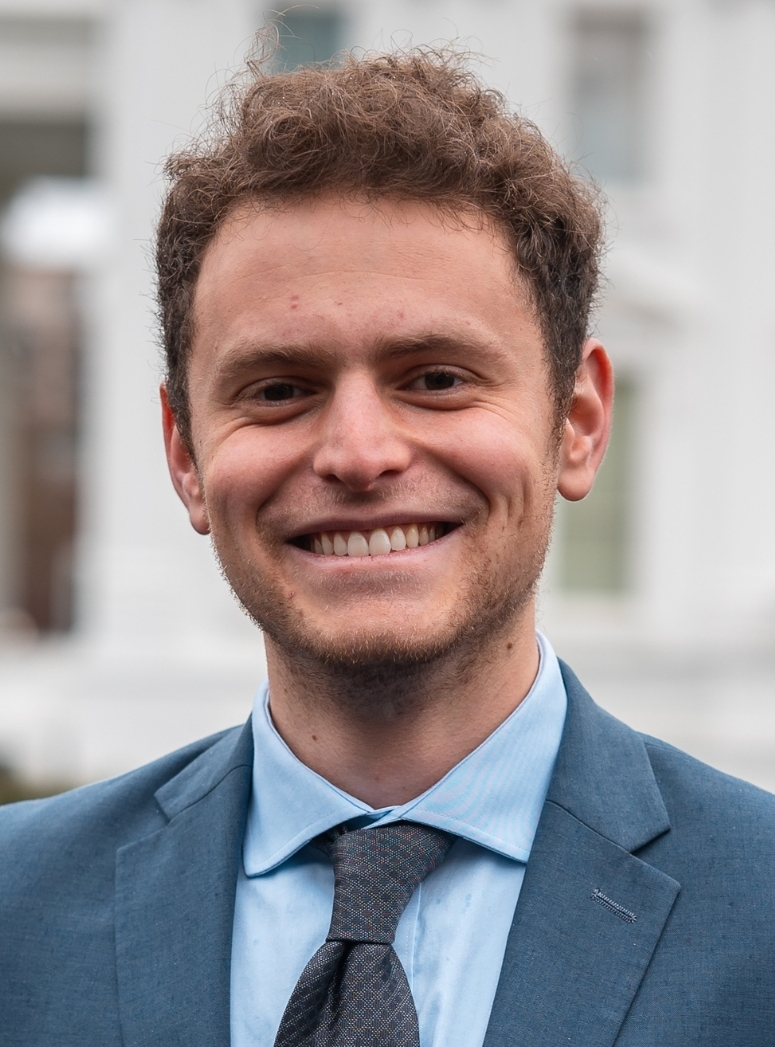
- Parnas in 2024
- Born: Aaron Gideon Parnas; April 16, 1999 (age 27); Boca Raton, Florida, U.S.
- Education: Florida Atlantic University (BA); George Washington University (JD)
- Political party: Republican (before 2020); Democratic (2020–present)
- Spouse: Arielle Stephenson (m. 2024)
- Children: 1
- Father: Lev Parnas

Instagram information
- Page: aaronparnas
- Followers: 3.4 million

Substack information
- Newsletter: The Parnas Perspective
- Years active: 2024–present
- Topics: U.S. politics, current events, legal analysis
- Subscribers: 896,000

TikTok information
- Page: aaronparnas1
- Years active: 2022–present
- Followers: 5.6 million

YouTube information
- Channel: Aaron Parnas
- Subscribers: 836,000
- Last updated: September 30, 2026

Aaron Gideon Parnas (born April 16, 1999) is an American attorney and journalist based on TikTok.

As of 2026, he has over 5.4 million followers on TikTok, 5 million more across other platforms, and his Substack newsletter, The Parnas Perspective, is the top-ranked news newsletter on the site with more than 887,000 subscribers. He has previously worked as a securities litigation attorney in Washington, D.C. Parnas is a member of the Forbes 30 under 30 class of 2026, being recognized in the media category.

== Early life and education ==
Parnas was born in Boca Raton, Florida, to businessman Lev Parnas and Barbara Ison. He is of Jewish-Ukrainian descent. He graduated from Florida Atlantic University High School and simultaneously earned a Bachelor of Arts in political science and criminal justice at the age of 18.

He received his Juris Doctor with honors from George Washington University Law School in 2020 at the age of 21. While in law school, Parnas received awards for oral advocacy, including the Cohen & Cohen Mock Trial Award and the Graduation Award for Excellence in Pre-Trial and Trial Advocacy. He later clerked for Judge Sheri Polster Chappell of the U.S. District Court for the Middle District of Florida.

Parnas has cited watching the televised Casey Anthony trial at age 12 as a formative moment that sparked his interest in law and public defense.

== Career ==
=== Legal career ===
In 2019, Parnas interned at Greenberg Traurig, the former law firm of Rudy Giuliani. Following law school, he worked at Bell Rosquete Reyes Esteban PLLC and served on the board of the Florida Justice Center. He later joined the securities litigation team at Levi & Korsinsky LLP in Washington, D.C.

=== Political evolution ===
Parnas initially identified as a Republican and supported Donald Trump in the 2016 election. After his father's involvement in the Trump–Ukraine scandal, Parnas left the Republican Party and registered as a Democrat. He voted for Joe Biden in the 2020 election and served as press secretary for the Miami-Dade Democratic Party in 2021.

While his father's legal scandal played a role in his political realignment, Parnas has also cited a personal health scare and visits to underfunded classrooms as pivotal in forming his progressive views. He has said these experiences highlighted the importance of access to healthcare and equitable education, issues that pushed him toward Democratic politics.

=== Digital media and journalism ===
Parnas began posting videos on TikTok in early 2022, offering commentary and updates on the Russian invasion of Ukraine. By March 2022, his content had drawn a substantial following. That month, he participated in a virtual White House briefing with other creators to address disinformation about the war.

Following his coverage of Ukraine, Parnas broadened his focus to include U.S. politics and legal topics. He has commented publicly on the role of social media in elections, suggesting that platforms such as TikTok play a growing role in political discourse among younger voters. Following Senator Cory Booker's record-breaking marathon speech on the Senate floor, Parnas was the second journalist to interview him.

In 2025, Parnas’s Substack became the top-ranked newsletter in the news category, and he was awarded $25,000 as part of the platform's "TikTok Liberation Prize" initiative. That year, he also began regularly interviewing high-profile politicians on his Substack and social media platforms, including Senate Minority Leader Chuck Schumer, Senator Adam Schiff, Representative Tom Suozzi, and Governor Gavin Newsom.

Parnas is known for his rapid-fire, front-facing video delivery style and around-the-clock news coverage. His videos, often recorded on the move or in casual settings, have reached over 180 million unique viewers in a six-month span. While some critics have challenged the clarity of his sourcing, Parnas has stated that he credits journalists when appropriate and independently sources many of his stories. Parnas has also begun writing for the MeidasTouch Network where he has broken multiple exclusive stories including one concerning live fire drills over Interstate 5 in California.

Parnas's news content is often produced spontaneously in informal settings. In one instance reported by Rolling Stone, he was spending time with his friend Sam Schmir, a former White House digital strategist, when he texted, "I think we have something." Parnas promptly recorded a TikTok video about the developing story, which received over 125,000 views within an hour. Olivia Julianna, a fellow political content creator, has also described Parnas filming videos in unusual places, including outside the Cheesecake Factory, and joked that she occasionally records him "running off to film" mid-conversation.

In 2026, Parnas co-moderated a panel, alongside Barrett Adair, Suzanne Lambert, and Ishaia Martin that was part of the Embassy of Italy in Washington, D.C.'s Digital Diplomacy Series.

=== Publications ===
In 2020, Parnas self-published a memoir titled Trump First: How the President and His Associates Turned Their Backs on Me and My Family, which described his personal perspective on the events surrounding the Trump–Ukraine scandal.

== Personal life ==
Parnas is Jewish and has spoken publicly about his heritage. As of 2026, he and his family live in Washington, D.C., and he works full-time as a social media commentator.

Parnas maintains a steady daily schedule: he wakes at 7:30 a.m., monitors multiple screens for live updates, and sometimes posts as many as 24 TikToks in a day. He is known for filming videos in unconventional locations, from airplane bathrooms to weddings, and has become a frequent subject of memes from both fans and critics.

Parnas is married to Arielle Stephenson, who gave birth to their first child on March 26, 2026.

== Public reception ==
Parnas has been described as a "20-something Walter Cronkite" for Gen-Z and Gen Alpha audiences, praised for his concise, to-the-point news delivery on TikTok and Substack. Olivia Julianna has likened his style to traditional broadcast journalism, adapted for a generation with shorter attention spans.

He has also received recognition from legacy media figures; CNN anchor Jim Acosta called him the "Defender of Gen Z," and journalist Katie Couric interviewed him on her podcast Next Question.

Politicians across the Democratic Party have embraced his platform. Senator Cory Booker called him a "source of light" in a 2025 interview, and Senator Adam Schiff noted the growing importance of digital creators like Parnas in political communication.

Still, his approach has drawn criticism. Some viewers have accused him of lacking transparency in sourcing, while others have taken issue with the perceived tone of his reporting on international conflicts, particularly the war in Gaza. Parnas has acknowledged the critiques and maintained that he cites journalists when appropriate and sources much of his own reporting independently.

He has addressed online criticism over his coverage of the Israel–Gaza conflict, stating that while he supports a two-state solution and Israel’s right to exist, he opposes the removal of Palestinians from Gaza or the West Bank. Parnas has said he has recorded over 500 videos on the conflict since October 2023 and believes Jewish creators are disproportionately scrutinized compared to non-Jewish peers. He has also expressed discomfort with reporting on events lacking verifiable sources and has encouraged viewers to diversify their news consumption.

In August of 2025, it was reported that Parnas is a member of the Chorus Creator Incubator Program, a subsidiary of the Sixteen Thirty Fund, a dark money group which provides a stipend to political online influencers to promote pro-Democratic party messaging. Parnas later confirmed his involvement with the group and said he had received $24,000 from them in early 2025, but denied that Chorus had any control over his content.
