= Dark Woke =

Style of progressive politics coined in 2025

Dark Woke is a social media phenomenon and political messaging strategy in the United States that emerged following the second inauguration of U.S. President Donald Trump in January 2025. The term's use advocates for a shift in progressive (or "woke") political communication tactics, pushing for more aggressive, direct, and politically incorrect approaches in responding to conservative media strategies. The term and its approach contrasts traditional communication norms in order to capture media attention similarly to Trump's approach, prioritizing visibility and emotional impact over disciplined debate.

== The term ==
The New York Times defined Dark Woke in 2025 as “an attempt to step outside the bounds of the political correctness that Republicans have accused Democrats of establishing.” The term represents a departure from traditional Democratic Party communication strategies, emphasizing disinhibited messaging and direct confrontation rather than conventional political decorum. The movement manifests primarily through social media content that combines progressive political messaging with provocative, dark humor and aggressive rhetoric against conservative opposition. Reported examples using the term or its hashtag included a Twitter post stating "my Grandma voted for Trump so I made sure she fell down the stairs" with a picture of an elderly white woman recoiling in pain attached, and Gritty, the mascot of the Philadelphia Flyers, waving a Pride flag captioned with: "When he bludgeons homophobes with that flag that's #DarkWoke."

Don Lemon Show senior writer and columnist for The Guardian Peter Rothpletz described the movement as emphasizing the importance of attention volume over attention type akin to Trump's disinhibition, contrasting with conventional Democratic preferences for avoiding negative attention. He cited Ezra Klein, writing for The New York Times, who argued that Trump's disinhibited statements and attitude towards opposition is "the engine of Trump's success" because it makes his rhetoric compelling and allowing him to speak out and argue about unique subjects in unconventional manners. Rothpletz believed that advocates for dark woke argue that traditional Democratic messaging approaches have become ineffective in contemporary media environments. He referred to it as "a call for the party to fight the messaging war that actually exists, not the one they wish existed".

Dark woke is the progressive left's attempt at mimicking this strategic attitude, contending that the current political climate calls for more drastic measures than restrained, politically correct responses. Political analysts, including MSNBC's Chris Hayes, noted that such actions represented a fundamental shift in approaching political communication. The movement has been observed an attempt to defy the "woke" qualities that many have viewed as cringe-worthy, such as virtue policing and extreme political correctness. Instead of upholding the "they go low, we go high" attitude associated with woke rhetoric, the Dark Woke crowd is adopting a "they go low, we go lower" approach instead.

Dark Woke-ness has taken hold almost entirely online, and started out as mostly ironic internet trolling. However, it quickly became something more when political figures and frustrated citizens alike realized that this strategy garnered more attention than previous "civility"-centered approaches. On a 2025 New York Times podcast, Hayes explained the disparity that exists between Democrats and Republicans when it comes to the "attentional ecosystem". He argued that Democrats "still believe that the type of attention you get is the most important thing", meaning if one's choice comes down to either negative attention or no attention, they should go for no attention. On the other hand, the pro-Trump faction of Republicans "believe that the volume, the sum total of attention, is the most important thing. And a lot of negative attention: not only fine – maybe great."

== History ==
Dark Woke has been described by media outlets as an evolution or extension of the "dirtbag left" approach in left-wing politics. During Trump's first presidential term from 2017 to 2021, Democrats broadly adopted what became known as the "Resistance" strategy, a broadly confrontational approach characterized by consistent opposition to Trump administration policies. The strategy manifested through legislative opposition, public protests, and aggressive social media engagement.

Following Democratic electoral defeats in 2024, party leadership, including Senate Minority Leader Chuck Schumer and House Minority Leader Hakeem Jeffries, urged colleagues to pivot away from personality-based conflicts toward substantive policy critiques. Senator Cory Booker described conservative dominance in certain media spaces and the rapid spread of narratives through right-leaning channels, and the necessity for Democrats to develop more effective countermeasures. Senator Chris Murphy described right-wing groups as having a "permanent information ecosystem" that allowed them to define democratic messaging online and prevent it from being amplified, like their viewpoints are.

The term "Dark Woke" first gained prominence on social media platform Twitter/X during Trump's second inauguration ceremonies. The term emerged as a reference to the earlier "Dark Brandon" meme, used to support Biden's presidency following his Battle for the Soul of the Nation speech against Trump and his supporters. The movement emerged amid significant political changes in early 2025 conducted by the Trump administration, including widespread corporate rollbacks of diversity, equity, and inclusion (DEI) programs and substantial changes to federal anti-discrimination policies. In contrast to more centrist or establishment Democratic figures advocating for disciplined debate, lawmakers more aligned with progressive positions, including Virginia Representative Don Beyer and Ocasio-Cortez, demonstrated greater willingness to maintain confrontational approaches. Such approaches began to be raised, particularly towards Trump's pardon for January 6 defendants.

The use of "dark woke" was catalyzed by an interaction between Democratic Representative Alexandria Ocasio-Cortez and conservative influencer Chaya Raichik. The exchange began when Ocasio-Cortez released an Instagram video explaining her absence from inaugural events, stating: "I don't celebrate rapists." After Raichik criticized Ocasio-Cortez on her @LibsofTikTok account by stating that Trump should sue her in reference to a defamation settlement against ABC News anchor George Stephanopoulos, Ocasio-Cortez replied, "Oh, are you triggered? Cry more." The reply garnered 17 million views, and led to several accounts praising the more direct, unscrupulous approach to resistance and using the "Dark Woke" phrase.

Another early adopter of the aesthetic was Texas Representative Jasmine Crockett, who responded to right wing Representative Marjorie Taylor Greene claiming that Crockett's "fake eyelashes were messing up her reading" during a House Oversight Committee meeting by describing Greene as having a "bleach-blonde, bad-built, butch body", and later nicknamed paraplegic Texas Governor Greg Abbott "Governor Hot Wheels". In addition to politicians, commentators characterised as "Dark Woke" include Kyle Kulinski, Suzanne Lambert, and the podcast I've Had It.

Although this style of communication has been more associated with the progressive left, it has influenced some more moderate figures. For example, in a response to a January 2026 X post by Republican Representative Randy Fine claiming that stripping Democratic colleague Ilhan Omar of her US citizenship and deporting her "would solve" an alleged unexplained increase in her net worth, former Republican operative and Never Trumper Rick Wilson replied that "Hunting (Fine) with harpoons and whaleboats would solve all this", prompting responses including Fine being photoshopped in place of the whale in a promotional image for a 2011 TV miniseries adaptation of Moby-Dick. The term extended to real-life actions, including videos depicting vandalism of products associated with conservative figures, such as the Tesla Cybertruck. A media stunt by California Governor Gavin Newsom consisted of him showing off kneepads that he implied were for leaders "selling out" to the Trump administration.

== Criticism ==
Several Democratic lawmakers, such as New York Representative Tom Suozzi and Nevada Representative Susie Lee who are generally considered to be moderate Democrats, expressed concern that reflexive and aggressive opposition to Republican talking points would damage their electoral prospects in moderate districts. Representative Lee argued against having a "knee-jerk reaction to be opposed to everything", and advocating for looking into Trump's policies to determine their appeal to voters in moderate counties.

Journalist Kieran Press-Reynolds generally dismissed the movement as an "algorithmic fad built on quick thrills". He also believed that superficial attempts to assimilate the movement's edginess into mainstream Democratic politics without embracing substantive political changes would not lead to electoral success, similarly to previous appropriations of online progressive movements like "Dark Brandon" and "BRAT". Journalist Ross Barkan at Intelligencer asserts that "the real trouble" with Dark Woke is that it's a "plainly false, calibrated attempt at gritty authenticity." He views it as merely a means to "catch up" to Trump's lack of conventional political decorum and an attempt at shock value that rarely lands with voters.

Republicans dismiss the Democrats' efforts as simply blowing hot air. CJ Pearson, a conservative activist and podcast host, remarked that "what they need to stop doing is trying to copy our homework and go invent something of their own...if they do that, it’ll be a lot more authentic than whatever they’re doing right now." Despite their attempts at higher engagement, Democrats are not quite yet on par with Republicans when it comes to digital media. According to The Washington Post, conservatives have a decade-long head start.

== See also ==
- Dirtbag left
- Dark Brandon
- Tone policing
- Woke 2.0
