= Dirtbag left =

Style of left-wing politics

The dirtbag left is a style of left-wing politics that eschews civility to convey a left-wing populist and anti-capitalist message, often using vulgarity. It is most closely associated with American left-wing online media that emerged in the mid-2010s, such as the podcast Chapo Trap House.

== Origins ==
Vulgarity is the language of the people, and so it should be among the grammars of the left, just as it has been historically, to wield righteously against the corrupt and the powerful.

— Amber A'Lee Frost, "The Necessity of Political Vulgarity"

The term was coined by Amber A'Lee Frost, who used it to refer to both Chapo Trap House and its audience of millennials with economic difficulties.

== Popularization ==
The dirtbag left is most closely associated with the American politics podcast Chapo Trap House, which Frost co-hosts. Chapo emerged in 2016 in the context of the 2016 Democratic Party presidential primaries and subsequent presidential election. It combines political analysis and punditry from a socialist perspective with elements of comedy and irony, in the style of a shock jock. Chapo gained attention for its criticism of both the Republican and Democratic parties, particularly what the podcast claimed was the Democratic Party's complicity with a conservative agenda.

Beyond Chapo, media outlets that have been linked to, described as, or identify with the dirtbag left include the podcasts Street Fight Radio, TrueAnon, and Cum Town; the publications The Baffler and Current Affairs; and internet streamer Hasan Piker. These outlets are noted as presenting comedy as "applied to an ideological reading of the news of the day, with a particular focus on political feeling or style."

Dirtbag left-style humor resurged after Donald Trump won the 2024 United States presidential election in the form of a trend called "Dark Woke", described as treating MAGA in the same vulgar manner that it has long treated everyone else. In The Guardian, Peter Rothpletz wrote that Democrats should use it to criticize Republicans under the label "Dark Woke" or #DarkWoke.

== Tenets and rhetorical style ==
The dirtbag left has been described as an anti-fascist, anti-conservative, anti-nationalist, anti-centrist, and anti-liberal ideology. It has been linked to a variety of political stances, including anti-political correctness; anti-inequality; a disregard for civility; opposition to the wealthy and support for redistributive economic policies; and support for both the 2016 and 2020 presidential campaigns of Bernie Sanders. The Iraq War and 2008 financial crisis have been cited as particular radicalizing events for the dirtbag left.

Rhetorically, the dirtbag left is noted as a vulgar, "bawdy offensive balance to cautious mainstream liberal politics", with "a dismissive attitude towards the niceties of liberal political correctness" that frequently direct insults and attacks through social media at specific public figures with political or economic power. The Times of London cited the rise of this rhetorical style as evidence of "the limitations of wokeness as a political force" and an example of the changing nature of politics on the internet.

Despite the connotations of the term dirtbag left, its use is not typically considered derogatory, with The New York Times calling the term "a defense mechanism that doubles as a nickname." Self-identification with the term is indicative of the dirtbag left's tendency toward irony and self-deprecation, with Frost noting that the term "speaks to a lot of people who have been dismissed or chided by liberals for embracing vulgarity, eschewing sanctimony or piety, and refusing to be civil to the right wing", adding that the term "says something positive about what we do believe, and what we’re willing to ruthlessly fight for, regardless of established etiquette." Chapo co-host Will Menaker joked that "if you sleep on a mattress on the floor and fuck in a sleeping bag, then you just might be the dirtbag left", before explaining that he sees the dirtbag left as a "scurrilous and funny approach to left-wing politics" that contrasts "utterly humorless and bloodless" liberalism.

== Contextualization in U.S. politics ==
=== In political and politics studies ===
Discourse around populism has generally focused on anti-elitism and popular sovereignty. The rise of populism has been attributed to a number of factors, which are disputed in academic spheres. The main drivers are often listed as "hyperglobalization" (coined by the economist Arvind Subramanian), the ideological motive of neoliberalism, the end of communism, and an actual or perceived loss of individual power in Western societies. Research on the populist left, particularly in the U.S., is somewhat limited. Focus on far-left political ideologies has been more pervasive in Europe, given the strength of leftist ideological movements and left-wing extremism in response to World War II. There are journals and research centers dedicated to the far right, and to political extremism in general, such as UC Berkeley's Journal of Right Wing Studies, the University of Cardiff's Interdisciplinary Research program on Antifascism and the Far Right, and American University's Polarization & Extremism Research & Innovation Lab (PERIL).

While reactionism is most often associated with conservatism, political theory has identified both left and right reactionism. The far left, and as a subset, the dirtbag left, may be classified as a leftist reaction to actual or perceived failures of the U.S. left, primarily the Democratic Party, to protect democratic principles and deliver on economic policies.

The dirtbag left, critical of both the rising strength of the conservative movement and establishment Democratic politics, has forged a political ideology that draws on key populist sentiments and eschews mainstream Democratic Party norms in debate style, discussion topics, and rhetoric. It departs from centrist liberals in holding that progressive economic policy should supersede progressive social policy, particularly symbolic actions or political correctness, and rejects virtue signaling. The dirtbag left has been associated with both populism and anti-reactionary politics. As described by a UC Santa Cruz professor of history of consciousness:

"political correctness" is a substitute for radical politics, a wish for a radical community that we don't have, and for the ability to make changes that seem beyond our reach.

In political theory the dirtbag left is most commonly associated with socialism, while the style is similar in rhetoric to online alternative discourse.

=== In new media studies ===
The rise of new media in political discourse has allowed for the proliferation of what is known colloquially as the "online left". Use of technology such as YouTube and social media to share ideas on U.S. politics and create community discussions within an ideological canon has become essential to both left and right spheres. This has been studied through the academic lenses of digital studies, media and politics, and political psychology. But academic research on both the ideological classification of the dirtbag left and the political left's sphere of influence online is limited. Current research has focused primarily on the alt-right and the movement's use of digital spaces for information dissemination, and at times radicalization. The term "alt-left" has also been used to describe this movement, but has not been widely adopted.

Some studies claim the dirtbag left is a proponent of "violence toward women and minorities through harassment, symbolic violence, and hostility." This claim is made in The Palgrave Handbook of Gendered Violence and Technology, whose authors first define the dirtbag left as a:

hat tip to the vulgar populism that undergirded the content they created.

One study defends this claim, classifying the dirtbag left with other manosphere communities online. In response, a researcher at the University of Tübingen argues that while the dirtbag left is dominated by male influencers from Anglophone countries, they are not more likely to believe in conspiracy theories or push political beliefs that target minority groups.

== Reception ==
Writer Amanda Marcotte argued that the ideology is linked to "that male privilege of intimidating people into assuming you're cool" and comparing it to the television series Jackass. Canadian writer Jeet Heer argued that the dirtbag left is a form of "doomed to fail" dominance politics, arguing that "derision is useful for one half of politics—defeating the opposing party—but has nothing to say to the crucial other half of forming alliances that can govern effectively for the people." Around the same time, in 2018, the Boston chapter of the Democratic Socialists of America issued a statement highlighting the continued legacy of sexism in the organization.

Writing for The New Yorker, Andrew Marantz found that since Bernie Sanders's 2020 presidential campaign, the hosts of Chapo Trap House, a main source of dirtbag left content, have moved their rhetorical style toward politics and entertainment, likening the show to The Daily Show.

Ten years after the popularization of the term, leftist publication Jacobin questioned the rhetorical strength of this form of politics, as influencers and politicians supported by the dirtbag left have mostly supported mainstream Democratic candidates and messaging.

== See also ==
- Dark woke
- Dimes Square
- Mass media and American politics
