= Primer (cosmetics) =

Cosmetic

A cosmetic primer is a cream applied before another cosmetic to improve coverage and lengthen the amount of time the cosmetic lasts on the face.

== Variations ==
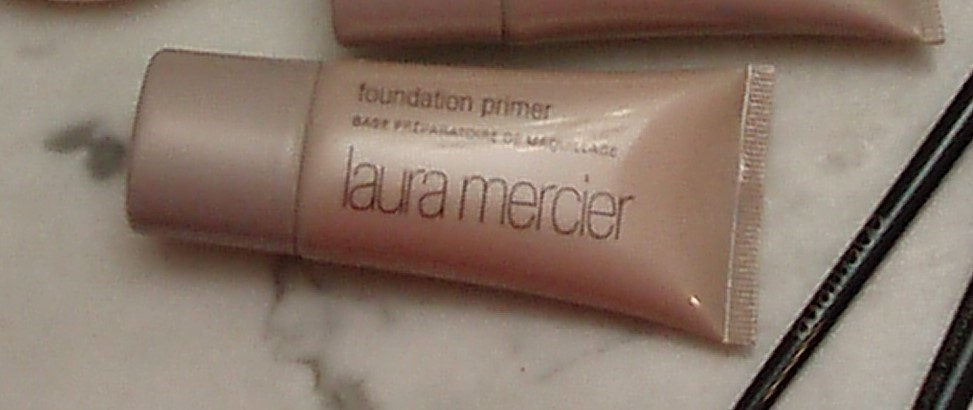
A tube of foundation primer

There are different kinds of cosmetic primers, such as foundation primer, eyelid primer, under-eye primer, lip primer, mascara primer, and mattifying primers.

A foundation primer may work like a moisturizer, or it may absorb oil with salicylic acid to aid in creating a less oily, more matte appearance. Some contain antioxidants such as A, C, and E, or other ingredients such as grape seed extract and green tea extract. There are water-based and silicon-based foundation primers. Ingredients may include cyclomethicone and dimethicone. Some primers do not contain preservatives, oil or fragrance. Some may also have sun protection factor (SPF). Some foundation primers are tinted to even out or improve skin tone or color. Others give a pearlized finish to make the complexion more light-reflective. There are also foundation primers, which are mineral-based primers which contain mica and silica.

Eyelid or eye shadow primers are similar but made specifically for use near the eyes. An eyelid primer may help even the color of the lid and upper eye area, may reduce oiliness, may add shimmer, or inversely may mattify. Eye primers aid in the smooth application of eye shadow, prevent it from accumulating in eyelid creases, and improve its longevity. Eye shadow primers are applied to the eyelid and lower eye area before the application of eye shadow. They even out the skin tone of the eyelids, hide eyelid veins, and smooth out the skin of the eyelids. Eye shadow primers help with the application of eye shadows. They intensify the color of the eye shadows and keep them from smearing or creasing by reducing the oiliness of the lids. Some eye shadows even state in the instruction sheet that they are recommended for usage over the eye shadow primer. There is a real difference in the eye shadow color and time of wear when it is used over the primer on bare skin. The effect of eye shadow primers is not limited to eye shadows. They also work for eyeliner and eye shadow bases.

Under-eye primer is designed to be applied before concealer to reduce the appearance of fine lines and wrinkles. It creates a smooth canvas for the concealer, which helps it last longer and prevents creasing.

Under-eye primers are specifically formulated to be gentle on delicate skin, often containing moisturizing or blurring ingredients.

Mascara primer is sometimes colorless. It usually thickens or lengthens the lashes before the application of mascara for a fuller finished look. It may also help keep mascara from smudging or flaking, and some claim that it can improve the health of the lashes.

Lip primers are intended to smooth the lips and help improve the application of lipstick or lip gloss, although exfoliating the lips is often recommended before applying. They also are intended to increase the longevity of lip color and to prevent lipstick from "feathering", that is, smearing past the lip vermilion, and especially from migrating into any fine lines around the lips.

Mattifying primers are a type of cosmetic primer used to create a smooth and even base for makeup application, with the added benefit of controlling oil and shine on the skin. Unlike regular makeup primers, the main purpose of a mattifying primer is to provide a matte finish that can last for hours, making it particularly useful for people with oily or combination skin. Excess oil on the skin can cause makeup to slide off or break down throughout the day, but by creating a matte base, mattifying primer helps to keep makeup in place and reduces the need for touch-ups. In addition, some mattifying primers contain ingredients that can help to blur the appearance of pores, fine lines, and other imperfections, creating a smoother-looking complexion. Overall, the use of mattifying primers has become increasingly popular in recent years due to their ability to address the common issue of oily skin, making them a valuable addition to many people's makeup routines.
