= Ken Klippenstein =

American journalist (born 1988)

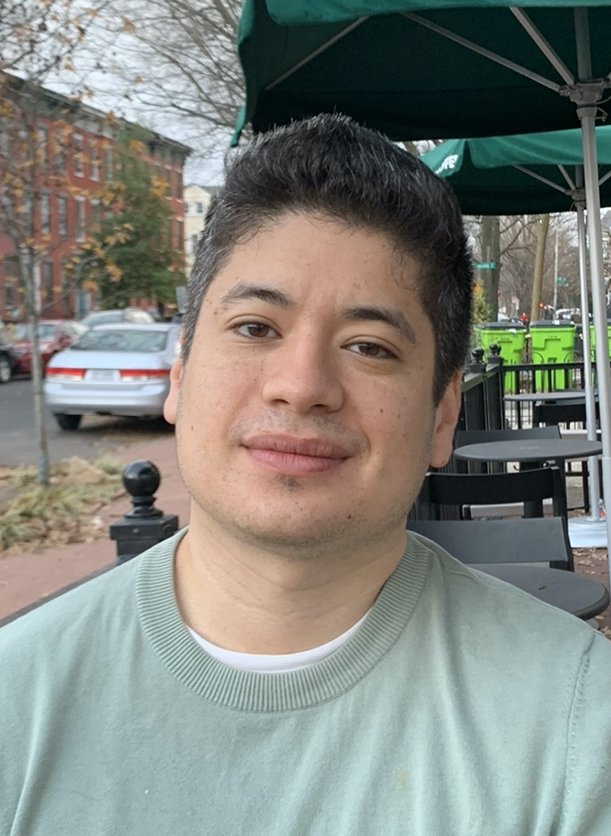
- Klippenstein in 2021
- Born: Kenneth Klippenstein; February 1, 1988 (age 38)
- Education: Wheaton College (BA)
- Occupation: Journalist
- Years active: 2018–present
- Employers: The Nation; The Intercept; The Young Turks
- Website: kenklippenstein.com

Kenneth Klippenstein (born February 1, 1988) is an American journalist who worked at The Intercept. Before that, Klippenstein was the D.C. Correspondent at The Nation and a senior investigative reporter for the online news program The Young Turks. His work has also appeared in The Daily Beast, Salon, and other publications. His reporting has focused on U.S. national security, politics, activism, corporate controversies and the media.

== Early life and education ==
He is the son of Stephen J. Klippenstein, a theoretical chemist for the Department of Energy at the Argonne National Laboratory. Klippenstein has said that his mother's family immigrated from El Salvador as undocumented migrants to the United States. Klippenstein graduated from Wheaton College in Wheaton, Illinois, in 2010 with a Bachelor of Arts degree in English literature.

== Career ==
Klippenstein's journalism career began in Madison, Wisconsin. By 2018, he was working with The Young Turks. In 2020, Klippenstein joined The Nation as their D.C. correspondent. On April 30, 2024, Klippenstein announced in his newsletter that he was resigning from The Intercept and would primarily work on his own.

On September 26, 2024, Klippenstein shared a dossier on vice-presidential candidate JD Vance, reportedly hacked from the Trump campaign and allegedly leaked by Iran, in his newsletter and linked to it from his X account. The dossier was prepared by the Trump campaign to vet Vance. Klippenstein said other media also had access to the dossier but were afraid to publish it because Iran may have been responsible for the hack. He said he was "not a believer of the news media as an arm of the government, doing its work combatting foreign influence". Klippenstein's Twitter account was then suspended, and he reported that the FBI visited him with "no subpoena, no search warrant, no prior announcement, no claim of illegality".

On December 10, 2024, Klippenstein published an alleged manifesto by Luigi Mangione, the suspect in the killing of United Healthcare CEO Brian Thompson; according to Newsweek, police confirmed his transcription's accuracy. Explaining why he published the manifesto when other media outlets had not, Klippenstein pointed to paternalistic attitudes in corporate media and the fear of alienating law enforcement sources. Klippenstein published the purported manifesto of a gunman who shot two Israeli diplomats in May 2025.

In 2025, Klippenstein was mentioned in Donald Trump's lawsuit against The Wall Street Journal.

In 2026, when Maine senate candidate Graham Platner was accused of threatening an ex-girlfriend and sending sexually explicit texts to women who were not his wife; Klippenstein defended Platner, writing that Platner represented the end of "smoothgroin" politics, comparing other politicians to Ken dolls with sexual features. “People are done with the clean-cut types who’ve harbored ambitions for political office since they were on high school student council and have lived every waking moment accordingly,” Klippenstein wrote. After Platner was subsequently accused of rape, Klippenstein said this allegation was disqualifying, but said he would refuse to apologize for his prior defense of Platner, writing that commentators “are trying to bully anyone who defended Platner against the earlier scandals into issuing self-abasing public apologies, by implying that anyone who doesn’t is pro-rape.”

=== Use of the Freedom of Information Act ===
Klippenstein is a self-described "FOIA nerd"; much of his journalism draws on information he has uncovered from records requested at state and national levels of the US government. His articles also frequently include information from leaked documents. He obtained leaked documents from the PR firm Qorvis, which implicated the company pitching the private company Caliburn on a propaganda video in order to improve the reputation of Caliburn's Homestead, a Florida shelter for "unaccompanied alien children". In an April 2020 article, Klippenstein reported on a leaked document showing that the Pentagon had warned the White House in 2017 about the risk of shortages and ill-preparation for a pandemic brought on by a novel coronavirus such as SARS-CoV-2. Klippenstein, along with Talia Lavin and Noelle Llamas, successfully sued the U.S. Immigration and Customs Enforcement. In December, 2020, he filed two new FOIA lawsuits: one against the U.S. Department of Justice, and the other against U.S. Immigration and Customs Enforcement, U.S. Customs and Border Protection, U.S. Department of State, Federal Bureau of Investigation, Defense Intelligence Agency, Office of Intelligence and Analysis, U.S. Department of Energy, Cybersecurity and Infrastructure Security Agency.

During the George Floyd protests, Klippenstein's reporting uncovered documents regarding federal policing of the protests. Specifically, Klippenstein obtained an FBI document that stated the Washington Field Office "has no intelligence indicating Antifa involvement/presence" during DC-area protests in contradiction to Attorney General William Barr and other officials' assertions that antifa were specifically responsible for instigating violence. He also reported that contacts working at the Department of Homeland Security were disgruntled about orders to generate internal intelligence reports on journalists covering protests in Portland, Oregon as well as participating activists. Later, he co-authored with Lee Fang an article published by The Intercept in October 2022 regarding leaked documents exposing Department of Homeland Security's plans to secretly police disinformation online. In response, Klippenstein was interviewed on Useful Idiots, where he expressed concern about what he saw as a major media failure regarding intelligence information oversight in a situation with no one in control as things drift toward disaster.

On August 9, 2023, Klippenstein authored an article published on The Intercept regarding information Klippenstein obtained via FOIA requests about "[t]he star witness of Congress's UFO hearings, David Grusch", and Grusch's history relating to PTSD, depression, suicidal thoughts, and alcohol use. On August 10, 2023, during an interview with Breaking Points, Klippenstein stated that he spoke with both "DoD people and intelligence people" while working on his article; Klippenstein described his sources as "mid-level people", who are "experienced, but didn't quite have the political chops generally to quite make it to the top."

== Online pranks ==
According to The Daily Beast, Klippenstein "has a history of pranking unknowing targets on Twitter". After a Twitter flame war with Tesla CEO Elon Musk, he shared a Vogue photograph from the 2014 Vanity Fair Oscars afterparty showing Musk with Ghislaine Maxwell, a long-time associate of the late Jeffrey Epstein, who had been convicted of sex trafficking. Twitter owner Musk responded by posting that Klippenstein was a "douche-about-town". On January 9, 2024, Klippenstein and other journalists were abruptly banned from Twitter without explanation. After the ban received media coverage, Klippenstein and the other journalists were reinstated.

In July 2019, Klippenstein was covered in the media after a Twitter incident in which he was retweeted by Iowa Congressman Steve King just before changing his Twitter display name to "Steve King is a white supremacist". In March 2021, Klippenstein pranked author Naomi Wolf by recommending she tweet an image of a fabricated anti-vaxxer quotation paired with a picture of American pornography actor Johnny Sins.

On Memorial Day 2021, Klippenstein tricked political commentators Dinesh D'Souza and Matt Schlapp, as well as former Florida Congressman Matt Gaetz, into retweeting a photograph of John F. Kennedy's assassin Lee Harvey Oswald, whom Klippenstein claimed was his veteran grandfather. After being retweeted by Gaetz, Klippenstein changed his display name on Twitter to be "matt gaetz is a pedo". Gaetz later deleted his retweet.
