= Tina Alster =

American dermatalogist and academic

Tina S. Alster, MD, FAAD, is an American dermatologist, educator, researcher, and author. Alster specializes in dermatologic laser surgery and cosmetic dermatology. She is the founding director of her skin care clinic, the Washington Institute of Dermatologic Laser Surgery, and is a clinical professor of dermatology at Georgetown University Medical Center in Washington, D.C.

== Education ==
Alster attended Montgomery Blair High School (1974-77) in Silver Spring, MD, where she was valedictorian of her class. She graduated Magna Cum Laude from Duke University with a B.S. Nursing (1977-81), and was inducted into the Sigma Theta Tau nursing honor society. She obtained her MD degree with Honors and Distinction in research from Duke University School of Medicine (1982-1986). She completed her dermatology residency at Yale New Haven Hospital at Yale University (1987-89) and a Dermatologic Laser Surgery Fellowship at Boston University Hospital (1989-90), where she began her research on scars.

== Career ==
=== Early career ===
During her post-doctoral training at Yale University, Alster met a young woman seeking to reduce the appearance of her facial port-wine stain. Alster came across the 1989 paper Treatment of Children with Port-Wine Stains Using the Flashlamp-Pulsed Tunable Dye Laser, by Oon Tian Tan, MD, which described the use of a vascular laser to successfully treat port-wine stain birthmarks. The article motivated Alster to pursue a specialized fellowship under Tan. Alster's eventual successful treatment of her port-wine stain patient, and concomitant groundbreaking work on laser scar revision, launched her career in laser surgery and led to her moniker "Laser Queen."

Alster also removed many tattoos. She said that "of all the tattoos I remove, cosmetic tattoos [permanent makeup] are the hardest" due to unpredictable laser reactions from color ingredients. In 1996, Alster published study results in the journal Plastic and Reconstructive Surgery showing that then-new CO_{2} lasers could nearly eliminate scarring risks. In 1997, she published The Essential Guide To Cosmetic Laser Surgery, with Lydia Preston.

=== Washington Institute of Dermatologic Laser Surgery ===
Alster is the Medical Director of the Washington Institute of Dermatologic Laser Surgery (WIDLS), a private laser center she founded in 1990. She specializes in dermatologic laser surgery and cosmetic dermatology, performing a wide-range of procedures, including laser scar revision, laser treatment of vascular and pigmented birthmarks, laser-assisted hair removal, neuromodulators and dermal filler injections, noninvasive skin tightening, cellulite and cutaneous fat reduction, fractional skin resurfacing, and microneedling.

=== Research and work ===
Alster conducted numerous institutional review board (IRB)-approved clinical trials using specialized lasers, devices, and other cosmetic treatments that have led to FDA approval of technologies and products in common use today, including Botox, Xeomin, Coolsculpting, Fraxel, Thermage, and Ulthera. She served as a consulting dermatologist for Lancôme La Mer/Estée Lauder for nearly a decade before establishing her own skin care line, the A Method, in 2018.

Patients with challenging traumatic scars are referred to Alster from around the world. One of these was Ayad al-Sirowiy, a 13-year-old boy injured by a landmine in Iraq that embedded hundreds of shrapnel fragments into his face, leaving him with significant scarring and blindness. In 2005, the boy was transported from Iraq to Washington, D.C., where Alster removed the shrapnel and treated his scars pro bono with a laser.

Alster's work with burn scars led more recently to the referral of a domestic abuse and burn victim survivor, Yvette Cade, who underwent 50 surgeries before receiving laser treatment by Alster.

Since 1991, Alster has been a clinical professor at Georgetown University School of Medicine. She is also an associate physician at Duke University School of Medicine. She has taught hundreds of post-doctoral dermatology and plastic surgery residents at these institutions as well as through preceptorship programs sponsored by the AAD, ASDS, ASLMS, and WDS.
