= Cross Creek Programs =

Former Utah reform school

Cross Creek Academy

Location
- 150 North State Street; La Verkin, Utah 84745, United States of America 37°12′15.15″N 113°16′18.43″W

Information
- Other names: Cross Creek Manor Cross Creek Center Cross Creek Academy
- Type: Specialty Boarding School
- Motto: "Not just a program, but a solution."
- Established: 1988
- Founder: Robert Lichfield, Brent Facer
- Status: Closed
- Closed: 2012
- Director: Karr Farnsworth
- Grades: 7–12
- Age range: 12–19
- Mascot: Bobcats
- Accreditation: Northwest Accreditation Commission
- Newspaper: Cross Creek Chronicle (former)
- Affiliation: World Wide Association of Specialty Programs
- Website: https://web.archive.org/web/20110129202501/http://crosscreekprogram.com/

Cross Creek Programs was a Specialty Boarding School facility in La Verkin, Utah, operated by the World Wide Association of Specialty Programs and Schools (WWASPS). It sometimes is referred to as two facilities, with the name Cross Creek Manor applied to the girls' program and the name Cross Creek Center used for the boys' program, which were originally in different locations. Cross Creek Academy and Browning Academy have been used as names for the academic program. Cross Creek Programs was founded in 1988 by Robert Lichfield and Brent Facer, originally only for girls. Before founding Cross Creek, Lichfield had worked at Provo Canyon School.

The cross creek programs used teen escort company to facilitate the transporting from adolescents from their parents residents to the program.

== History ==
Cross Creek Programs was a Specialty Boarding School founded in 1988 by Robert Lichfield and Brent Facer, originally only for girls in La Verkin, utah. The school ("Cross Creek Academy") was educationally accredited through the Northwest Accreditation Commission.

In 1999, Robert Lichfield incorporated the company World Wide Association of Specialty Programs and Schools Inc with the help of his attorney Ralph Atkin.

In 2006, a lawsuit was filed against Cross Creek and other defendants, alleging widespread physical and psychological abuse of the teenagers sent into their programs.

== Controversy ==
In an interview, multiple graduates, parents and staff members from the school described the program as manipulative, abusive and traumatic.

One graduate claimed he was forcibly kidnapped from his home, handcuffed, beaten, and taken across state lines against his will to be transported to the program, or in short legally trafficked.

Another graduate claimed to be supervised by a male staff member when she was showering at the age of 13.

Another graduate claimed that male staff members performed rape re-enactment on girls who have been sexually abused, stating that other students were instructed to yell insults at the victim during the re-enactment.

The parent of another graduate described the process as a "manipulative, well-orchestrated, hurtful project", that the parent was not allowed to tell anyone where their child was, and that all mail communication was read beforehand.

Executives from the school have denied these allegations, saying the accusers just "didn't like their parents trying to help them".
