= The Program: Cons, Cults, and Kidnapping =

2024 American documentary miniseries

- Genre: Documentary
- Directed by: Katherine Kubler
- Music by: Gia Margaret
- Country of origin: United States
- Original language: English
- No. of episodes: 3

Production
- Executive producers: Katherine Kubler; Diane Becker; Melanie Miller; Rachel Libert; Brian Knappenberger
- Producer: Brooke Workneh
- Cinematography: Peter Castagnetti
- Editors: R. Brett Thomas; Sammy Smart
- Running time: 61–66 minutes
- Production companies: Fishbowl Films; OmniVision

Original release
- Network: Netflix
- Release: March 5, 2024

The Program: Cons, Cults, and Kidnapping is a 2024 American true crime documentary series, directed by Katherine Kubler. It follows Kubler and former classmates of hers from the Academy at Ivy Ridge, a behavior modification facility that was marketed as a boarding school, as they reflect on the abusive conditions they experienced in the program and the lasting trauma.

It was released on March 5, 2024, on Netflix.

== Premise ==
Katherine Kubler, alongside her classmates from Academy at Ivy Ridge, reflect on and describe the horrors they experienced during their time in the program and how they coped with it. In many instances they confront perpetrators of The Program and their own parents for the first time, armed with new evidence acquired from the abandoned facility.

== Episodes ==
No.	Title	Directed by	Original release date
1	"Where The F**k Am I?"	Katherine Kubler	March 5, 2024
2	"Mind Control"	Katherine Kubler	March 5, 2024
3	"Follow the Money"	Katherine Kubler	March 5, 2024

== Production ==
After attending Academy at Ivy Ridge in Ogdensburg, New York, Katherine Kubler wanted to make a documentary after seeing a lack of resources available to explain what had happened to her.

== Reception ==
=== Critical reception ===
On Metacritic, the series holds a weighted average score of 80 out of 100, based on 4 critics, indicating "generally favorable reviews".

Joel Keller of Decider praised the series writing: "The Program: Cons, Cults and Kidnapping does a good job of showing the harrowing conditions at the Academy at Ivy Ridge and other disciplinary schools, while also showing the resiliency of the people who were sent there and endured those condition." Nick Schager of The Daily Beast also praised the series writing: "Presents a terrifying insider's view of the institution and the lasting damage on those who attended."

=== Local reception ===
Following the documentary's release, several former Ivy Ridge employees lost their jobs due to the abuse allegations. No criminal charges were filed as a result of the documentary, though an Ivy Ridge employee, John Free, was arrested on separate homicide charges shortly after the documentary was released. Tom Nichols, a St. Lawrence County Election Commissioner and chair of the Republican committee, faced calls for his dismissal after the documentary publicized his employment at Ivy Ridge and the United Methodists of Upper New York distanced themselves from Nichols' Methodist church.

== See also ==
Related topics

- World Wide Association of Specialty Programs and Schools
- Residential treatment center
- Therapeutic boarding school
- Troubled teen industry
- Youth rights
- Teen escort company
- Internet addiction camp

Documentaries

- Kidnapped for Christ
- Hell Camp: Teen Nightmare
- Children of Darkness
- This Is Paris

Other WWASP programs

- Academy at Dundee Ranch
- Casa by the Sea
- Spring Creek Lodge Academy
- Tranquility Bay
