= Academy at Ivy Ridge =

Closed behavior modification facility

Location
- 5428 State Highway 37, Ogdensburg, New York, St. Lawrence County, New York 13669; 44°38′15″N 75°34′8″W

Information
- School type: Private
- Established: 2001
- Closed: 2009
- CEEB code: 334279
- President: Jason Finlinson
- Director: Jason Finlinson
- Age range: 12 to 18
- Color
- Accreditation: Northwest Association of Accredited Schools
- Affiliation: World Wide Association of Specialty Programs

Academy at Ivy Ridge was an independent privately owned and operated for-profit abuse facility in Ogdensburg, New York, that marketed itself as "a boarding school ... for troubled teenagers." The 2024 Netflix documentary series The Program: Cons, Cults, and Kidnapping documented the conditions at the facility and the lasting impact it had on the people who attended it.

== Ownership and affiliation ==
The institution was owned by a business partnership consisting of the Jason G. Finlinson Corporation and the Joseph and Alyn Mitchell Corporation. The property on which the school stood was purchased in 2001 by Robert Browning Lichfield Family Limited of Toquerville, Utah, and the school opened later that year in affiliation with the World Wide Association of Specialty Programs and Schools (WWASPS). In 2003, the New York Times reported that the school's director had previously been an administrator at Casa by the Sea. In January 2006, Ivy Ridge announced that it had withdrawn from WWASPS the previous November because of the negative media attention that WWASPS was receiving. However, the Teen Help subsidiary of WWASPS was still marketing for the school as late as March 2007.

== Location ==
The Academy at Ivy Ridge sits on 237 acres (0.96 km^{2}) of land located close to the St. Lawrence River. The facility, the former home of Mater Dei College, has over 200,000 square feet (20,000 m^{2}) of building space which houses classrooms, dorms, recreational areas, computer centers, science labs, food services, and offices. School promotional materials state that the facility boasts cross-country ski trails, nature trails, tennis courts, basketball courts, sand volleyball area, baseball, football and soccer fields, all located within a wooded setting. However, students were not permitted to look out windows at "lower levels". A student could reach "upper level" status in as little as 8 months and then earn the privilege to look outside, and, once a month, be taken outside.

== History ==
The institution began admitting students in 2001, and as of spring 2005 there were 460 students enrolled.

Some students started a riot on May 16, 2005, resulting in at least 4 dozen expulsions and 12 arrests. About 35 sheriff's deputies, state troopers, city police officers and U.S. Border Patrol agents assisted in ending the riot and capturing at least 30 runaways. Later in the 2024 documentary series The Program: Cons, Cults, and Kidnapping they stated that the Academy at Ivy Ridge had become overcrowded with people even sleeping on mattresses in the hallway. This was due to a large group of new arrivals who came from another WWASPS program called Casa by the Sea which had been closed by the Mexican government.

Allegations of abuse include poor living conditions, unauthorized medical procedures, psychological torture, sexual abuse, and physical abuse. Closed-circuit television camera video footage obtained from the school demonstrate violent restraint tactics used against students.

In March 2009, it was announced that Ivy Ridge would close until fall 2009 to restructure. There were about 60 students enrolled at that time; they were to be sent home or transferred to similar boarding schools. In April 2009, the campus was sold to a Delaware corporation, with a spokesperson for the purchaser telling news media that the school would not reopen.

In 2024, following the release of The Program: Cons, Cults, and Kidnapping, the St. Lawrence County district attorney Gary Pasqua announced the launch of an investigation into the Academy at Ivy Ridge.

As of June 3, 2024, the campus remains abandoned and the property is listed for sale at $875,000.

On June 26, 2024, The Salt Lake Tribune reported that Robert Lichfield's brother and fellow WWASPS associate Narvin Lichfield, who was director at the affiliated Academy at Dundee Ranch, had filed a civil lawsuit against The Program: Cons, Cults and Kidnapping director Katherine Kubler and Netflix, alleging that he had been defamed and secretly recorded.

== Lawsuits and abuse ==
The facility has repeatedly been sued by past students for the widespread abuses. After the location was abandoned in 2009, alumni found that extensive records of abuse had been filed and recorded. Various lawsuits against Ivy Ridge, including testimony from students, are documented in The Program: Cons, Cults, and Kidnapping, a Netflix docuseries released in 2024.

Additionally, they would arrange for pickup of teens and children without the parents being made aware of the full circumstances of their training. Parents were generally unaware of the abuses before sending their children there and, due to the censorship of letters when students wrote home, no meaningful communication about it could occur. This left parents unaware of the abuse until after their children graduated.

Following the 2024 documentary, there have been calls for the investigation and prosecution of child abuse, with particular focus on former resident overseer, Amy Ritchie, former employee George Tulip and founder Robert Lichfield.

== Legal status as a school ==
On August 17, 2005, Ivy Ridge was ordered to pay civil penalties of $250,000 to the New York State Attorney General, stop issuing unauthorized high school diplomas, and refrain from advertising that it is an accredited school. In addition, it was required to make partial refunds to former students. On December 1, 2006, the New York State Department of Education denied Ivy Ridge's application for authorization to issue high school diplomas. The department's letter to Ivy Ridge stated that the institution had been determined to be principally a behavior modification program, not a school. Following this ruling, the school's enrollment dropped from about 500 to less than 100 students.

In connection with the incident, the Idaho-based Northwest Association of Accredited Schools, which had accredited Ivy Ridge, was criticized for accrediting a school outside of its service area and for violating its own procedures by not requiring a state license as a prerequisite to accreditation. In April 2009 a judge refused to dismiss a lawsuit related to the diploma issue.
