= Provo Canyon School =

Former Utah youth treatment center

Coordinates: 40°10′40″N 111°38′21″W

Location
- Boys' campus: 4501 North University Ave, Provo, Utah 84604; Girls' campus: 763 North 1650 West, Springville, Utah 84663-5066; Provo, Utah; Utah; United States

Information
- Funding type: Private
- Religious affiliation: Nonsectarian
- Founded: 1971
- Founders: Robert H. Crist, and Jack Williams
- Status: Closed
- Closed: August 16, 2026
- Category: Residential Treatment Center
- CEEB code: 450320
- NCES School ID: A0503514
- Administrator: Dave Campbell (girls campus)
- Grades: 3 to 12
- Gender: Males and females
- Age: 8 to 17
- Capacity: 225 (combined)
- Language: English
- Schedule type: Daily bell class rotation
- Schedule: Monday to Friday
- Hours in school day: 5.5
- Campuses: 2
- Campus type: Rural
- Accreditations: The Joint Commission, The Substance Abuse and Mental Health Services Administration (SAMHSA), and Cognia: North Central Association Commission on Accreditation and School Improvement (NCA CASI); Northwest Accreditation Commission (NWAC); Southern Association of Colleges and Schools Council on Accreditation and School Improvement (SACS CASI)
- Website: Official website

Provo Canyon School (PCS) was a residential treatment center that compelled unsuspecting parents to enroll their children to become students, educating from primary through secondary education in Utah, United States. Founded in 1971, the school provided unregulated residential treatment and unorthodox educational services to children and adolescents with behavioral, emotional, and psychiatric needs. The institution operated campuses in Provo and Springville and was owned by Universal Health Services from 2000 until its closure in 2026.

On July 17, 2026, the Utah Department of Health and Human Services revoked the licenses of both campuses following investigations into the treatment and safety of residents. Due to its licenses being revoked, the facilities have shut down.

== History ==
=== Establishment ===
Provo Canyon School was established in 1971 by psychiatrist Robert H. Crist and Jack Williams and began operating in Mapleton, Utah as a residential treatment center for boys.

==== 2020 ====
In September 2020, Paris Hilton premiered her YouTube Originals documentary This Is Paris. in which she attributes her chronic insomnia to post-traumatic stress disorder developed as a result of being sent to four different troubled teen industry programs: CEDU, Ascent Wilderness Program, Cascade school, and PCS. After escaping from the first three, she spent 11 months at PCS in the late 1990s. Hilton reported that she and other students were physically and psychologically abused. Hilton also alleged that students were administered medication without informed consent, subjected to physical restraint, transported to the facility by a youth transport firm, strip-searched upon arrival, and placed in a seclusion room. On October 9, 2020, Hilton and other former students organized a silent protest outside the school.

In October 2020, Kat Von D said that she had been sent to PCS as a teenager. She said that she had initially been expected to remain for three weeks but stayed for six months. Von D alleged that she witnessed students being forcibly medicated, sedated, isolated, and physically abused. Von D wrote that she could not "call them schools because they're not schools; they're fucking lockdown facilities". Von D said that she was "spared of the sexual abuse and the physical abuse" but "definitely saw" it happen.

==== 2023 ====
In March, a student fight injured three people, including a staff member who later died; police investigated whether the assault contributed to his death. In April, police investigated a reported sexual assault following a referral from the Division of Child and Family Services.

==== 2024 ====
In February 2024, investigative filmmaker Robert Bliss posed as a mental health technician at PCS. He secretly recorded inside the facility using hidden camera glasses. UHS of Provo Canyon filed a federal lawsuit against Bliss for wiretapping and breach of confidentiality. Bliss invoked Utah's Anti-SLAPP law (the Uniform Protected Expression Protection Act), asserting a First Amendment right to report on matters of public concern. However, that September, Bliss agreed to a permanent injunction, agreeing to give up the video footage and to not publish anything he recorded at PCS.

==== 2026 ====
On August 15, 2026, YouTuber Ben Schneider, known as Reckless Ben, published an undercover investigation of the residential treatment center. Schneider and a friend, Sheldon Norcross, entered the Provo campus while posing as a prospective student and employee. Schneider, who was 30, posed as a 17-year-old prospective student whose father wanted him admitted because of his purported "gay thoughts". He was accepted, and the facility sought approximately $49,400 in tuition for his first month. Norcross succeeded in being hired as a mental health technician, despite having a criminal background that should have prevented him from passing a background check to be able to work with young people. The video, filmed secretly on cameras the two smuggled in, shows clips of "staff telling new employees that they hold teenagers in physical restraints 250 to 300 times a month", as well as the alleged verbal and physical treatment, isolation, inadequate education, and poor food conditions at the facility. Schneider left the facility after two days by climbing over a fence. Staff initially contacted his supposed father about outstanding tuition fees, later also reporting his disappearance.

In June 2026, the Utah Department of Health and Human Services imposed restrictions on the Provo campus following an investigation into an incident involving a minor resident. Investigators found that staff had failed to protect the resident during a physical assault, delayed emergency medical treatment, and failed to respond adequately to previous safety concerns. The Springville campus was ordered to cease services by August 6, while the Provo campus was ordered to cease services by August 16.

== Governance ==
PCS was a private, for-profit residential treatment center. It was owned by Universal Health Services from 2000 until its closure in 2026.

On July 6, 2026, Utah Department of Health and Human Services announced that they had revoked the license for the residential treatment center, citing failure to maintain the health and safety of clients, for engaging in unnecessary restraint and aggressive physical contact with clients, failure to report critical incident occurrences within one day, failure to ensure clients were treated equally and failure to adequately train staff. The Springville campus was subsequently ordered to terminate all services by August 6, 2026.

On July 17, 2026, Utah's DHHS announced it was revoking the license for its primary campus in Provo. This was due to the facility failing to protect students from harm and abuse, for depriving students of water and rest, and for physical abuse. The facility terminated all services on August 16, 2026.

On July 27, 2026, The Salt Lake Tribune reported that Universal Health Services, which operated PCS, had filed appeals.

On August 16, 2026, the PCS website began to display an "Open Letter to Our Community" detailing how they've ceased providing behavioral health services.

== Curriculum ==
Provo Canyon School provided year-round academic instruction to its residents. Its educational programs included special education, career counseling, and competitive sports. The school was accredited by the Northwest Accreditation Commission.

== Notable alumni ==
- Paris Hilton – media personality and businesswoman; at age 16, she attended PCS for 11 months and was released in early 1999, around the time she turned 18.
- Kat Von D – tattoo artist and television personality; at age 15, she attended PCS for six months in 1991.
- Benjamin Schneider – YouTuber and investigative content creator; at age 30, he attended PCS for two days in 2026 while posing as a 17-year-old student.

== Notable staff ==
- Robert Lichfield – founder of the World Wide Association of Specialty Programs and Schools.
