= Boot camp (correctional) =

Correctional facility for youth criminals

Boot camps are part of the correctional and penal system of some countries. Modeled after military recruit training camps, these programs are based on shock incarceration grounded on military techniques. The aggressive training used has resulted in deaths in a variety of circumstances. Boot camps are also criticized around the world for their lack of behavioral change and for the way extreme force can traumatize children and teenagers.

== Background ==
The term "boot" originates from US Navy and Marine recruits in the Spanish–American War (1898) who wore leggings called boots. These recruits were trained in "boot" camps.

Military-style training was used in the eighteenth century to rehabilitate civilian prisoners in the United States and for military prisoners during World War II.

== Use around the world ==
=== Australia ===
In Australia, the Liberal National Premier of the state of Queensland Campbell Newman announced that boot camps for convicted young people will open in Townsville and Rockhampton by September 2013, along with two other camps. These boot camps closed in 2015 under the Labor government.

=== China ===
In the People's Republic of China, boot camps mainly for internet addiction disorder, known as internet addiction camps or "special training schools" (Chinese: 特训学校; pinyin: Tèxùn Xuéxiào), have been widely criticized for their abusive methods and harsh conditions.

=== Canada ===
In Canada, participation in boot camp programs is voluntary, so as to avoid any challenges under the Canadian Charter of Rights and Freedoms under which treatment at boot camps could be seen as an infringement on a youth's right to not be subject to cruel and unusual punishment and to ensure security of person.

The provincial government of Ontario funded a private boot camp project for non-violent juveniles, Project Turnaround, from 1997 to 2004. The camp was a "tougher" alternative to Ontario's other youth detention facilities as part of a tough on crime response to increasing youth incarceration rates by the government of Premier Mike Harris.

=== New Zealand ===
In New Zealand, boot camps have been established on several occasions as part of the corrections system. These boot camp programmes have typically focussed on a small group of young male offenders, and have used military-style training. The establishment of boot camp programmes has been a pre-election promise made prior to several general elections since 2008 by political leaders from the National Party, and there has been a significant level of popular support. However, multiple studies have shown that these programmes are ineffective in reducing rates of re-offending, and some argue that they increase the likelihood of criminal activity. The concept has been widely criticised for failing to address the root causes of criminal behaviour by young people, such as abuse within the family, mental health issues and homelessness. As early as 1997, the Corrections Minister Paul East of the National Party acknowledged that corrective training was not effective in reducing youth re-offending and said:

"It's clear from what Prison Officers are telling me that we need to provide these young people with programmes which target the reasons for their recidivism…"

Boot camp-style programmes ran at youth detention centres between 1961 and 1971. These were followed by boot camps (1971–1981), "corrective training" (1981–2002), and "Military Activity Camps" (2010–2016). As of 2025, the National-led coalition government is funding the establishment of boot camps called "Military-style Academies" as part of its youth justice programme.

=== United States ===
The first boot camps appeared in the states of Georgia and Oklahoma in 1983. Boot camps are intended to be less restrictive than prison but harsher than probation.

In most U.S. states participation in boot camp programs is offered to young first-time offenders in place of a prison term or probation; in some states a youth can also be sentenced to participate in such a program. The time served can range from 90 to 180 days, which can make up for prison sentences of up to 10 years. Federal shock incarceration programs are authorized under 18 U.S.C. § 4046, although the placement requires consent of the prisoner.

In 1995, the U.S. federal government and about two-thirds of the 50 states were operating boot camp programs. Presently, there are no statistics as to how many boot camps there are in the U.S. In 2000, there were 51 boot camps still open. In 2010, 80% of participants were ethnic minorities.

State-run boot camps were banned in Florida on June 1, 2006, through legislation signed by Florida Governor Jeb Bush after 14-year-old Martin Lee Anderson died while in a boot camp. Anderson died as drill instructors beat him and encouraged him to continue physical exercise after he had collapsed. While Anderson was unconscious, guards placed ammonia tablets near his nose in an attempt to revive him, and he suffocated. Anderson attended Bay County Boot Camp in Panama City, Florida. The Victory Forge Military Academy in Florida has come under intense scrutiny of its methods, which border on physical abuse. The camp's defense is that the parents had signed a contract authorizing the use of physical force against their children.

== Evaluation ==
Studies in the United States suggest that boot camps with a strong therapeutic component (such as education, drug treatment and counselling) have a positive effect on participants, while those that have no counselling and consist only of physical activity have a significant negative effect. A key criticism is that the emphasis on authority can only result in frustration, resentment, anger, short temper, a low self-esteem and aggression rather than respect. Some boot camps have been the subject of abuse scandals. According to The New York Times there were 31 known deaths of youths in U.S. boot camps between 1980 and 2009, a rate of approximately one death each year.

== Alternatives ==
Boot camps claim to remove children "from environments filled with negative influences and triggering events that produce self-defeating, reckless or self-destructive behavior". Other types of programs (see outdoor education, adventure therapy, and wilderness therapy) use this method while avoiding all or some of the controversial methods of boot camps, and they claim lower recidivism.

== See also ==
- Behavior modification facility
- Fitness boot camp
- Juvenile court
- Gooning
- Rock and a Hard Place, an HBO documentary film about youth boot camps in the U.S.
- Brat Camp
- Borstal
