= Self Medicated =

- Theatrical poster
- Directed by: Monty Lapica
- Written by: Monty Lapica
- Produced by: Thomas (Tommy) Bell; Monty Lapica
- Starring: Diane Venora; Monty Lapica; Greg Germann; Michael Bowen
- Cinematography: Denis Maloney
- Edited by: Timothy Kendall
- Music by: Anthony Marinelli
- Distributed by: THINKFilm
- Release dates: June 2005 (CineVegas International Film Festival); August 31, 2007 (United States)
- Running time: 107 minutes
- Country: United States
- Language: English

Self Medicated is a 2005 American teen drama film written, directed by and starring Monty Lapica. Based on actual events in Lapica's life, the film is about a troubled teenager whose mother has him kidnapped at age 17 by a private company and forcibly committed to a locked-down psychiatric institute. Lapica was not originally going to star in the film. According to the subsequent documentary, The Making of Self-Medicated (2007), he did so after casting calls failed to produce a suitable candidate.

== Plot ==
On the edges of Las Vegas, 17-year-old Andrew's life is spiraling out of control. Unable to cope with the loss of his father, Andrew's descent into drugs and violence is gaining momentum, and the once promising young man is now headed for self-destruction.

Andrew's mother, helpless to control her son and fighting an addiction of her own, refuses to watch idly as her only child destroys himself. As a last resort, she hires a private company to forcibly kidnap and confine him in a locked-down and corrupt psychiatric hospital. As Andrew is subjected to the secret physical and emotional abuses of the program something inside him is re-awakened. He must somehow get free to save what's left of his life, but to do that, he knows he must first face his own demons head-on.

== Cast ==
- Monty Lapica as Andrew Eriksen
- Diane Venora as Louise Eriksen
- Michael Bowen as Dan Jones
- Greg Germann as Keith McCauley
- Kristina Anapau as Nicole

== Reception ==
On review aggregator Rotten Tomatoes, Self-Medicated has a score of 37% based on 38 reviews. The critics’ consensus reads, "Self-Medicated features some nice performances, but is too sentimental and unfocused to be a truly compelling film."

The Hollywood Reporter said there was "a raw, unmannered intensity in Lapica's performance sets the requisite tone for the entire production. Self- Medicated is just what the doctor ordered.", and Variety said the film was "a searing portrait of an out-of-control youth . . . strong acting from all quarters and an especially blistering performance from Lapica. Packs a startling punch!"

After complimenting the musical score by Anthony Marinelli and cinematography by Denis Maloney, Jeannette Catsoulis writes for The New York Times, "When the institutional 'abuses' promised in the press notes fail to materialize (unless you count enforced standing and essay writing), the story becomes a monotonous loop of escape and recapture."

== Release ==
The film was theatrically released on August 31, 2007 in 15 markets, including New York City, Los Angeles, Dallas, Houston, Boston, San Diego, Chicago, San Francisco, Denver, Portland, Seattle, Indianapolis, Phoenix, Austin, and Las Vegas.

== Awards ==
The film has toured the festival circuit extensively, collecting 39 awards.

- Rome Independent Film Festival – Grand Jury Prize — 2006
- Australian International Film Festival – Best Feature Film & Best Actress (Diane Venora)
- Angel Award — Best Motion Picture — 2007
- PRISM Award Winner — 2006
- WorldFest International Film Festival – Gold Remi Award — 2006
- Phoenix Film Festival – Sundance Channel Audience Award & Best Ensemble (Cast) — 2006
- Berkeley Film Festival – Grand Festival Award — 2006
- Memphis International Film Festival – Jury Award — 2006
- Tahoe/Reno International Film Festival – Best Spotlight Feature (Festival Prize) — 2005
- Newport Beach International Film Festival – Best First Feature (Breakthrough Award) — 2006
- San Luis Obispo International Film Festival – Best Feature — 2006
- Zion International Film Festival – Grand Jury Prize
- Santa Fe Film Festival – Best of the Southwest — 2005
- Tiburon International Film Festival – Best Actor (Monty Lapica) — 2006
- DIY Film Festival – Best Feature & Best Director — 2006
- George Lindsey UNA Film Festival – Professional Feature (Monty Lapica and Tommy Bell) — 2006
- Cosmos International Film Festival – Best Feature
- Flint International Film Festival – Competition Jury Prize
- Twin Rivers Film Festival – Feature Film Award
- Zoie Film Festival – Best Feature Film — 2006
- Big Island Film Festival – Best Feature & Up-And-Coming Filmmaker Award — 2006
- Santa Clarita Film Festival – Best Feature & Fuji Best Feature Shot on Film — 2006
- Lake Arrowhead Film Festival – Best Feature — 2006
- Trenton International Film Festival – Best Screenplay — 2006
- BridgeFest Film Festival Canada – Best Feature
- Staten Island Film Festival – Best New Filmmaker
- Estes Park Film Festival – Best Feature & Audience Award
- Tony Bennett / Mike Agassi Foundation – Inspiration Award
- New York VisionFest – Best Feature & Best Actor (Monty Lapica) & Best Editing — 2006
- Charlotte Film Festival – Audience Award — 2006

== See also ==
- Teen escort company
- World Wide Association of Specialty Programs and Schools
