= Tranquility Bay =

Private residential youth educational and treatment facility

Tranquility Bay

Tranquility Bay was a troubled teen program in Calabash Bay, Saint Elizabeth Parish, Jamaica, that operated from 1997 to 2009. Affiliated with the World Wide Association of Specialty Programs and Schools, it functioned as an adolescent behavioral modification facility.

== History ==
Tranquility Bay was founded in the year 1997.

Tranquility Bay was shut down in January 2009, after the case of Isaac Hersh gained national media and political attention and years of alleged abuse and torture came to light.
