= Robert Lichfield =

American businessman

Robert Lichfield is an American conman who was the founder of World Wide Association of Specialty Programs and Schools. He started working in the troubled teen industry in 1977. His first job in the industry was at Provo Canyon School as a dorm parent. Then in 1987 he started the Cross Creek School.

Lichfield has been linked to controversial network of schools for troubled teens and allegations of abuse and fraud. Lichfield was the founder of Academy at Ivy Ridge, as well as many other school programs reported to have committed child abuse. These were documented in the 2024 Netflix docu-series The Program: Cons, Cults, and Kidnapping, which featured former students of the WWASPS programs.

Lichfield is a long-time campaign fundraiser for Republican Senator and 2012 presidential candidate Mitt Romney.
