= Randolph, Utah =

Town in the state of Utah, United States

- Town
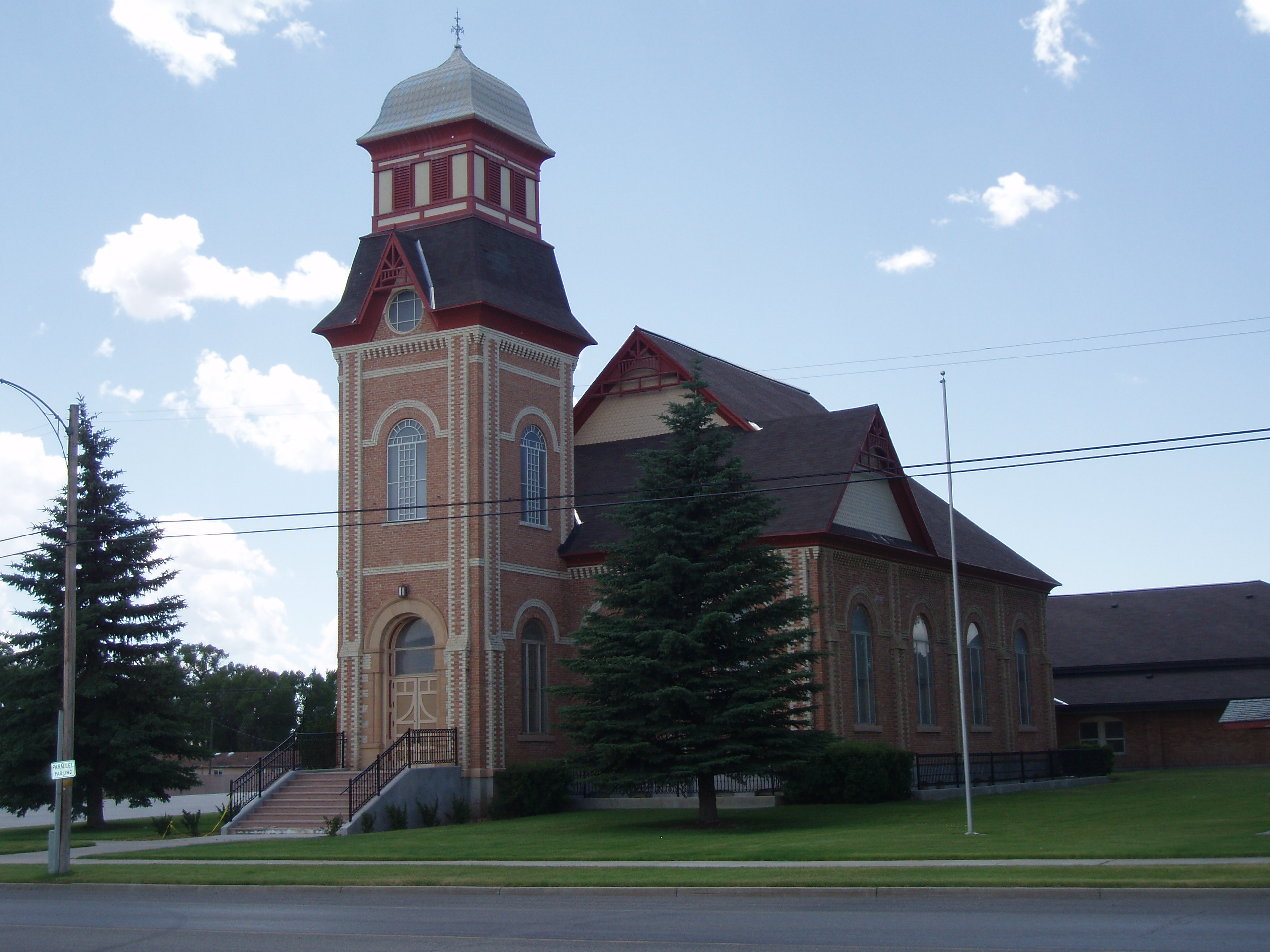
- The Randolph Tabernacle, an early Latter-day Saint meetinghouse which is still used today after being in use for a little over a hundred years

- Location in Rich County and the state of Utah

- Location of Utah in the United States
- Coordinates: 41°39′56″N 111°11′05″W
- Country: United States
- State: Utah
- County: Rich
- Founded: March 14, 1870
- Founder: Randolph H. Stewart

Area
  - Total: 1.29 sq mi (3.34 km^{2})
  - Land: 1.29 sq mi (3.34 km^{2})
  - Water: 0 sq mi (0.00 km^{2})
- Elevation: 6,290 ft (1,920 m)

Population (2020)
  - Total: 467
  - Density: 394/sq mi (152.1/km^{2})
- Time zone: UTC−7 (Mountain (MST))
  - Summer (DST): UTC−6 (MDT)
- ZIP code: 84064
- Area code: 435
- FIPS code: 49-63020
- GNIS feature ID: 2411518
- Website: www.townofrandolphut.gov

Randolph is a town in Rich County, Utah, United States and as of the 2020 census, the town population was 467. It is the county seat of Rich County. Randolph had the highest percentage of people of any city in the country vote for George W. Bush in the 2004 election, at 95.6% Randolph's municipal classification was officially changed from a city to a town on January 1, 2009. The controversial WWASPS boarding school Old West Academy (formerly Majestic Ranch Academy) is located just outside Randolph.

== Geography and climate ==
According to the United States Census Bureau, the town has a total area of 1.0 square mile (2.7 km^{2}), all land.

Randolph has a humid continental climate (Köppen Dfb), with long and cold winters, short summers with very warm days and cold nights, and fairly heavy winter snowfall totalling 70.8 inches or 1.80 metres during an average year. Between July 2008 and June 2009, there was as much as 98.9 inches (2.51 m), whilst the most precipitation in a calendar year has been 23.42 inches or 594.9 millimetres in 1998, although as much as 27.25 inches (692.1 mm) fell between July 1997 and June 1998. The driest calendar year has been 2020 with 7.07 inches or 179.6 millimetres, but as little as 6.28 inches (159.5 mm) fell between July 1988 and June 1989. The most precipitation in one day has been 2.26 inches (57.4 mm) on July 31, 1912, and the most in one month 5.16 inches (131.1 mm) in June 1998.

The hottest temperature has been 103 °F (39.4 °C) on July 20, 2026 and August 2, 2026, whilst the coldest has been −43 °F (−41.7 °C) on February 1, 1985.

Climate data for Randolph, Utah, 1991–2020 normals, extremes 1893–present
Month	Jan	Feb	Mar	Apr	May	Jun	Jul	Aug	Sep	Oct	Nov	Dec	Year
Record high °F (°C)	53 (12)	59 (15)	76 (24)	77 (25)	88 (31)	96 (36)	103 (39)	103 (39)	96 (36)	82 (28)	70 (21)	62 (17)	103 (39)
Mean maximum °F (°C)	42.8 (6.0)	46.6 (8.1)	58.0 (14.4)	69.4 (20.8)	77.8 (25.4)	85.1 (29.5)	90.4 (32.4)	88.5 (31.4)	82.8 (28.2)	73.8 (23.2)	60.1 (15.6)	46.4 (8.0)	91.0 (32.8)
Mean daily maximum °F (°C)	27.7 (−2.4)	31.6 (−0.2)	42.4 (5.8)	52.0 (11.1)	61.8 (16.6)	72.7 (22.6)	81.6 (27.6)	80.3 (26.8)	71.0 (21.7)	57.5 (14.2)	41.9 (5.5)	29.0 (−1.7)	54.1 (12.3)
Daily mean °F (°C)	15.9 (−8.9)	19.1 (−7.2)	30.2 (−1.0)	38.6 (3.7)	47.4 (8.6)	56.3 (13.5)	63.6 (17.6)	61.7 (16.5)	52.5 (11.4)	40.8 (4.9)	28.8 (−1.8)	17.7 (−7.9)	39.4 (4.1)
Mean daily minimum °F (°C)	4.1 (−15.5)	6.5 (−14.2)	18.0 (−7.8)	25.2 (−3.8)	33.0 (0.6)	39.8 (4.3)	45.6 (7.6)	43.0 (6.1)	34.1 (1.2)	24.2 (−4.3)	15.9 (−8.9)	6.3 (−14.3)	24.6 (−4.1)
Mean minimum °F (°C)	−18.9 (−28.3)	−16.1 (−26.7)	−3.4 (−19.7)	11.0 (−11.7)	17.5 (−8.1)	26.7 (−2.9)	34.6 (1.4)	29.9 (−1.2)	19.3 (−7.1)	8.6 (−13.0)	−6.0 (−21.1)	−17.7 (−27.6)	−24.3 (−31.3)
Record low °F (°C)	−40 (−40)	−43 (−42)	−25 (−32)	−15 (−26)	10 (−12)	18 (−8)	26 (−3)	17 (−8)	8 (−13)	−21 (−29)	−21 (−29)	−41 (−41)	−43 (−42)
Average precipitation inches (mm)	1.17 (30)	1.05 (27)	1.07 (27)	1.34 (34)	1.87 (47)	1.15 (29)	0.83 (21)	1.21 (31)	1.29 (33)	1.25 (32)	1.11 (28)	1.02 (26)	14.36 (365)
Average snowfall inches (cm)	12.7 (32)	12.6 (32)	10.3 (26)	6.1 (15)	1.8 (4.6)	0.1 (0.25)	0.0 (0.0)	0.0 (0.0)	0.6 (1.5)	3.6 (9.1)	9.3 (24)	13.7 (35)	70.8 (179.45)
Average extreme snow depth inches (cm)	9.7 (25)	10.7 (27)	8.3 (21)	3.7 (9.4)	0.7 (1.8)	0.0 (0.0)	0.0 (0.0)	0.0 (0.0)	0.4 (1.0)	2.0 (5.1)	4.0 (10)	7.3 (19)	13.3 (34)
Average precipitation days (≥ 0.01 in)	8.5	9.0	8.7	8.9	9.5	6.1	5.5	6.5	6.2	7.4	7.8	9.8	93.9
Average snowy days (≥ 0.1 in)	7.5	7.8	6.5	3.6	1.2	0.1	0.0	0.0	0.2	1.7	5.8	8.6	43.0
Source 1: NOAA
Source 2: National Weather Service

== Demographics ==
Historical population
Census	Pop.	Note	%±
1870	76		—
1880	446		486.8%
1890	472		5.8%
1900	821		73.9%
1910	533		−35.1%
1920	586		9.9%
1930	447		−23.7%
1940	656		46.8%
1950	562		−14.3%
1960	537		−4.4%
1970	500		−6.9%
1980	659		31.8%
1990	488		−25.9%
2000	483		−1.0%
2010	464		−3.9%
2020	467		0.6%
U.S. Decennial Census

As of the census of 2000, there were 483 people, 150 households, and 118 families residing in the town. The population density was 466.1 people per square mile (179.3/km^{2}). There were 190 housing units at an average density of 183.4 per square mile (70.5/km^{2}). The racial makeup of the city was 99.38% (480 people) White, 0.21% (one person) Asian, and 0.41% (two people) from two or more races. Hispanic or Latino of any race were 1.86% of the population (nine individuals).

There were 150 households, out of which 49.3% had children under the age of 18 living with them, 73.3% were married couples living together, 2.7% had a female householder with no husband present, and 20.7% were non-families. 18.7% of all households were made up of individuals, and 7.3% had someone living alone who was 65 years of age or older. The average household size was 3.21 and the average family size was 3.74.

In the town, the population was spread out, with 38.5% under the age of 18, 7.2% from 18 to 24, 26.3% from 25 to 44, 16.8% from 45 to 64, and 11.2% who were 65 years of age or older. The median age was 30 years. For every 100 females, there were 101.3 males. For every 100 females age 18 and over, there were 102.0 males.

The median income for a household in the town was $34,792, and the median income for a family was $42,917. Males had a median income of $35,625 versus $20,833 for females. The per capita income for the city was $13,477. About 9.5% of families and 14.0% of the population were below the poverty line, including 17.6% of those under age 18 and 3.5% of those age 65 or over.

== Notable people ==
- David M. Kennedy, Secretary of the Treasury from 1969–1971
- Reuben D. Law, college president, chairman of the Utah State Board of Education (1976–77)
