= Spring Creek Lodge Academy =

Former Montana boarding school

Location
- 75 Spring Creek Road; Thompson Falls, Montana 59873; 47.771°N 115.4577°W

Information
- Type: Specialty Boarding School
- Established: 1997
- Closed: 2009
- Age: 14 to 18
- Mascot: Timber Wolf
- Accreditation: Northwest Accreditation Commission

Spring Creek Lodge Academy was a Specialty Boarding School located in Thompson Falls, Montana. The school, formerly known as Spring Creek Community, was first opened in the 1970s by Nancy and Steve Cawdrey. In 1996, the school and the property were purchased by Cameron Pullan and Dan Peart and given the name Spring Creek Lodge Academy. For several years, the school was associated with the Utah-based World Wide Association of Specialty Programs and Schools. The school opened as a place to address behavioral issues of young people from across the United States, as well as motivate students for success.

Spring Creek Lodge Academy has been repeatedly criticized by Montana-based and national news organizations for its lack of governmental oversight, child abuse and neglect, and conditions which The New York Times called "physically and psychologically brutal". Spring Creek staff used highly controversial means of subduing children, including the use of solitary confinement in a small building called "The Hobbit". A 2021 article in The Missoulian said that "[t]roubled programs like Spring Creek Lodge, which kept children in locked sheds as a form of punishment, have seen owners move from one program to the next in Sanders County." According to a 2003 New York Times article, which came out while the program was still operating, "the program and its staff have been accused of sexual abuse, physical violence and psychological duress." Survivors of the program have gone on to write about the horrors of the experience.

Accusations against Spring Creek, as well as similar "troubled teen" programs in western Montana, have been rampant, and have led state legislators to propose various forms of action. According to Rep. Ellie Hill Smith, who attempted to bring a bill regulating these programs before the Montana Legislature in 2017, "[t]he Montana Family Foundation kills it every time. They say people have a right to religious education. I say to them, 'I don't have a problem with that. What I have a problem with is religious education or group homes that don't have to comply with state laws like the rest of our schools.'''

At its peak enrollment, Spring Creek Lodge Academy housed over 500 students and employed about 200 individuals in various positions, making it the largest employer in Sanders County at that time. Spring Creek Lodge Academy was also the largest of WWASP affiliated programs.

== History ==
Following the suicide of a 16-year-old girl at Spring Creek Lodge Academy in 2004, her mother filed a lawsuit asserting that Spring Creek Lodge Academy's ownership and WWASP was responsible for her daughter's death. Before her suicide, the girl had been punished by being forced to carry a bucket of rocks, according to depositions by the school's owners and staff. In the end, Spring Creek Lodge Academy settled the lawsuit for $3 Million.

On September 14, 2006, Spring Creek Lodge academy was featured in a Montana PBS documentary titled "Who's Watching the Kids?" which was highly critical of the program's treatment of the children under its watch, and showed interviews from a number of traumatized former attendees.

In the year 2007, Spring Creek Lodge Academy and the Monarch School voiced opposition to the initiatives put forth by the Montana government aimed at implementing regulations pertaining to adolescent programs. According to former state Rep. Ellie Hill Smith, the lobbying of these groups, along with The Montana Family Foundation, has been largely successful in keeping these programs unregulated by Montana's state agencies.

In 2010, the Montana-based Academy for National Native Leadership purchased the former Spring Creek facility and began to offer college classes at the school.

In 2019, The Missoulian published a series of articles about the troubled teen industry, specifically addressing the lack of oversight at Spring Creek, abuses committed by staff, and the suicide of a 16-year-old girl while in the program. Before her suicide, the girl had been punished by being forced to carry a bucket of rocks, according to depositions by the school's owners and staff.

== Notable alumni ==
- Hitmaka
