= Lifegate Christian School =

Lifegate Christian School may refer to:

- Lifegate Christian School (Eugene, Oregon)
- Lifegate Christian School, Seguin, Texas
