= Academy at Dundee Ranch =

Therapeutic boarding school in Costa Rica

Location
- 9°54′20″N 84°37′15″W

Information
- Established: 1991
- Founder: Narvin Lichfield
- Closed: 2003
- Director: Narvin Lichfield
- Accreditation: World Wide Association of Specialty Programs and Schools
- Annual tuition: $30,000

Academy at Dundee Ranch was a therapeutic boarding school for teenagers from the United States that operated in Costa Rica from 1991 until 2003. It was located at La Ceiba, Cascajal, approximately 10 kilometres (6.2 mi) west of Orotina, in Alajuela Province. The facility was promoted as a residential school offering behavior modification, academic instruction, structured activities, and motivational or "emotional growth" programs.

== History ==
Academy at Dundee Ranch was established in 1991. The facility was established as a residential program for teenagers. Promotional material described a structured program combining academics, behavior modification, recreational activities, and motivational seminars.

The facility was connected to WWASP, an organization that operated with a number of residential programs for troubled teenagers in the United States and abroad.

In May 2003, Costa Rican authorities began an investigation into the facility following concerns regarding its operation and the treatment of students. Authorities informed students of their legal rights during a visit to the academy, and Lichfield was subsequently taken into custody for a short period. The former director of Dundee Ranch said in a sworn statement in 2003 that WWASP took 75 percent of Dundee Ranch's income, leaving little money to care for its 200 children.

Following the closure of Dundee Ranch, a new WWASP-associated facility known as Pillars of Hope opened at the same site in 2004. Pillars of Hope was also advertised under the Spanish name Pilares de Esperanza. The facility was also associated with other names, including Seneca Ranch Second Chance Youth Ranch.

=== Controversy ===
During its operation, Dundee Ranch was the subject of multiple allegations of abuse. Parents and students both claimed that food was being withheld as punishment. Former students complained of emotional scars due to their stay there.

A judgment in Louisiana caused Costa Rican authorities to investigate the facilities. The investigation included allegations of emotional abuse, isolation, and physical restraint at the facility. A riot occurred at the facility in May 2003 leading to its closure. The Costa Rican immigration authorities found that 100 of the 193 children enrolled in the program did not have appropriate migration papers.

Because of the closure U.S. Representative George Miller asked U.S. Attorney General John Ashcroft to investigate WWASP.

Narvin Lichfield, who was the director at the time of the facility's closure, was jailed in Costa Rica for a brief period at the time of the closure. He was later tried in Costa Rica for "coercion, holding minors against their will, and 'crimes of an international character' (violating a law based on international treaties, specifically referring to torture)."

On February 21, 2007, a three-judge panel found Narvin Lichfield innocent of the charges of abuse. During the trial the prosecutor told the court that there was insufficient evidence and testimony to link Lichfield to the crimes of which he was accused. The Tico Times reported that the judges said they believed the students at Dundee had been abused, but there was no proof that Lichfield ordered the abuse. Three other Academy employees, all Jamaicans, had been wanted in connection with the same case, but they fled Costa Rica following the closure of the academy.

Following the acquittal, Lichfield claimed in an e-mail to A.M. Costa Rica that when the school was raided, police stood by and watched youths sexually assault each other, that police held parents and staff at gunpoint, that one parent was ordered at gunpoint to hang up the phone when she attempted to phone the U.S. Embassy for help, and that police left the school in a shambles.

== See also ==
- World Wide Association of Specialty Programs and Schools
- Troubled teen industry
- Behavior modification
