= Richard Hanania =

American academic and opinion columnist (born 1985)

- Born: August 28, 1985 (age 41)
- Occupations: Researcher, columnist, blogger
- Known for: Right-wing political commentary

Academic background
- Education: Moraine Valley Community College University of Colorado Boulder (BA); University of Chicago (JD); University of California, Los Angeles (PhD)
- Thesis: Moral Psychology and Support for the Use of Force in the International System (2018)
- Doctoral advisor: Marc Trachtenberg, Robert Trager

Academic work
- Discipline: Political science
- Sub-discipline: International relations
- Notable works: The Origins of Woke (Broadside, 2023)
- Website: www.richardhanania.com

Richard Hanania (born August 28, 1985) is an American political scientist, writer, and right-wing online personality. He is the founder and president of the think tank Center for the Study of Partisanship and Ideology (CSPI). He is the author of The Origins of Woke and Kakistocracy.

Between 2008 and the early 2010s, Hanania wrote under a pseudonym for alt-right and white supremacist publications. He acknowledged these writings when they were first reported in 2023 and has since renounced them.

Hanania was a contributor to Project 2025 regarding diversity, equity, and inclusion (DEI) practices. His advocacy against DEI has influenced Republican and conservative policy-makers in the United States, with Vox calling him "the man whose tweets helped kill DEI". He has since become critical of the second Trump administration, the MAGA movement, and far-right factions within contemporary conservatism.

== Early life and education ==
Hanania grew up in Oak Lawn, Illinois. He is the son of immigrants; his father is a Greek Orthodox Palestinian, and his mother is a Catholic Jordanian. (Note: Hanania, Richard (March 4, 2025). "Destiny Fights Richard Hanania On Trump vs Zelenskyy Meltdown". 0:13 – via YouTube.)

When he was 15 years old, he was sent to the residential treatment program Casa by the Sea, which operated as a center for troubled teenagers. He said the experience "completely changed the course of [his] life for the better".

He attended Moraine Valley Community College and studied linguistics at the University of Colorado Boulder, graduating with a Bachelor of Arts in 2009. He received a Juris Doctor from the University of Chicago Law School in 2013 and a Doctor of Philosophy in political science from the University of California, Los Angeles in 2018.

== Career ==
=== Writing as "Richard Hoste" (2008–early 2010s) ===
In 2023, HuffPost analyzed digital records and established that Hanania was the true identity of a poster, "Richard Hoste", who had written articles for multiple far-right publications between 2008 and the early 2010s Under the pseudonym, Hanania argued for eugenics—including the forcible sterilization of everyone with an IQ below 90—, denounced "race-mixing", and described white nationalism as "the only hope".

In response to the revelation, Hanania wrote: "Recently, it's been revealed that over a decade ago I held many beliefs that, as my current writing makes clear, I now find repulsive." In a 2025 Vox interview, he acknowledged that his former views were sincerely held, stating, "I was looking for people who were angry like me. And I think it was probably a lot of personal things going on in my life. By about 2012, 2013, I had sort of grown out of it, which I think often happens".

Some journalists and writers have cast doubt on whether Hanania has disavowed racism. For example, Adam Serwer wrote in The Atlantic, "People can and do change, even those with extreme views like these, but there's not much evidence that happened here." Similarly, The New York Times opinion columnist Jamelle Bouie wrote that "though he may claim otherwise, it doesn't appear that his views have changed much ... he still makes explicitly racist statements and arguments, now under his own name."

=== Later work ===
Hanania was a research fellow at the Arnold A. Saltzman Institute of War and Peace Studies of Columbia University and a fellow at Defense Priorities as of 2020. In 2022 he became a fellow at the University of Texas at Austin's Salem Center for Public Policy, which had been launched in 2020 with funding from right-wing donors.

Hanania has written opinion pieces for The Washington Post, The New York Times, The Atlantic, The Economist and Quillette. In 2020 he founded the think tank the Center for the Study of Partisanship and Ideology (CSPI). He is the organization's president. Hanania writes a blog, which was received positively by figures such as the Mercatus economists Tyler Cowen and Bryan Caplan and JD Vance, noted by Substack co-founder Hamish McKenzie, and publicized by Tucker Carlson, who invited Hanania on his show twice. Carlson later expressed strong hostility toward Hanania; The Atlantic reported that in 2024 he privately said that he loathed Hanania, and in 2026 called him "literally beneath contempt, which is to say not even worth attacking". Hanania also operates a podcast where he has interviewed various people, including the billionaire Marc Andreessen. In 2021, Vance described Hanania as a "friend" and a "really interesting thinker".

Hanania has been linked to the New Right. In a 2023 essay, Hanania wrote that the only way to reduce crime is "a revolution in our culture or form of government. We need more policing, incarceration, and surveillance of black people. Blacks won't appreciate it, whites don't have the stomach for it." (Note: Richard, Hanania (May 14, 2023). "Interracial Crime and "Perspective"". Richard Hanania's Newsletter – via Substack.) The essay caught the attention of Elon Musk, who called it "interesting".

In his 2023 book The Origins of Woke, Hanania argues that central causes of "wokeness" are the Civil Rights Act of 1964 and multiple inventive court decisions and executive orders. The book has promotional blurbs by Vivek Ramaswamy, David O. Sacks, and Peter Thiel, who wrote, "Hanania shows we need the sticks and stones of government violence to exorcise the diversity demon." In The Atlantic, Tyler Austin Harper called the book a "Trojan horse for white supremacy", arguing that it is grounded in the assumption that "Black people and women are less competent, capable, and intelligent than white men." Robert VerBruggen, writing in the Washington Examiner, called it "an interesting and mostly sober take on long-debated civil rights topics from one of the Right's most frustrating figures." The Age of Entitlement: America Since the Sixties has been called a precursor to Hanania's Origins of Woke.

Hanania was one of the contributors to the writing of Project 2025. He has since criticized President Trump and the MAGA movement. In particular, he argued that some of Trump's nominees for government positions, like Kash Patel and Robert F. Kennedy Jr., were not merit-based. Shortly after the president's "liberation day" speech, Hanania published an essay explaining why he believed he was mistaken in voting for Trump. Hanania told The New York Times that "the resistance libs were mostly right about" Trump.

In 2025, Vox described Hanania's essay "The Based Ritual" as anticipating the tone of recently leaked group chat messages among Young Republican members, noting that the fictional dialogue depicted young conservatives competing to make increasingly extreme statements about race and gender. In an interview with Vanity Fair, Hanania discussed similar trends, arguing that some young conservatives reacted to progressive cultural changes by embracing opposing extremes and stating that the trend within parts of the right was toward "more ethno-populism, more open racism, more misogyny." In December 2025, after he, along with Nicholas Decker, was recommended as an interesting writer to follow by Colorado Governor Jared Polis, the Denver Post called Hanania and Decker "sleazebags" and criticized Hanania for "deliberately muddying the waters on statutory rape".

In his 2026 book Kakistocracy: Why Populism Ends in Disaster, Hanania argues that populist movements tend to empower corrupt and incompetent leaders because they reject elite expertise and institutional norms. A 2026 profile in The Atlantic discussed the book alongside Hanania's break with Trumpism and reported that, by his own account, he remained right-wing on most policy issues. Since 2025, Hanania has regularly written opinion pieces for The Boston Globe, which has elicited backlash from some Globe readers given Hanania's past associations with the alt-right.

== Personal life ==
Hanania lives in Los Angeles with his wife, daughter, and two sons.

== Bibliography ==
- Ineffective, Immoral, Politically Convenient: America's Overreliance on Economic Sanctions and What to Do about It., Cato Institute, 2020.
- Public Choice Theory and the Illusion of Grand Strategy: How Generals, Weapons Manufacturers, and Foreign Governments Shape American Foreign Policy. Routledge. 2021. ISBN 9781000514001.
- The Origins of Woke: Civil Rights Law, Corporate America, and the Triumph of Identity Politics. Broadside Books. 2023. ISBN 9780063237216.
- Kakistocracy: Why Populism Ends in Disaster. Broadside Books. 2026. ISBN 9780063480001.
