= Randolph Tabernacle =

Historic church in Utah, United States

- U.S. National Register of Historic Places
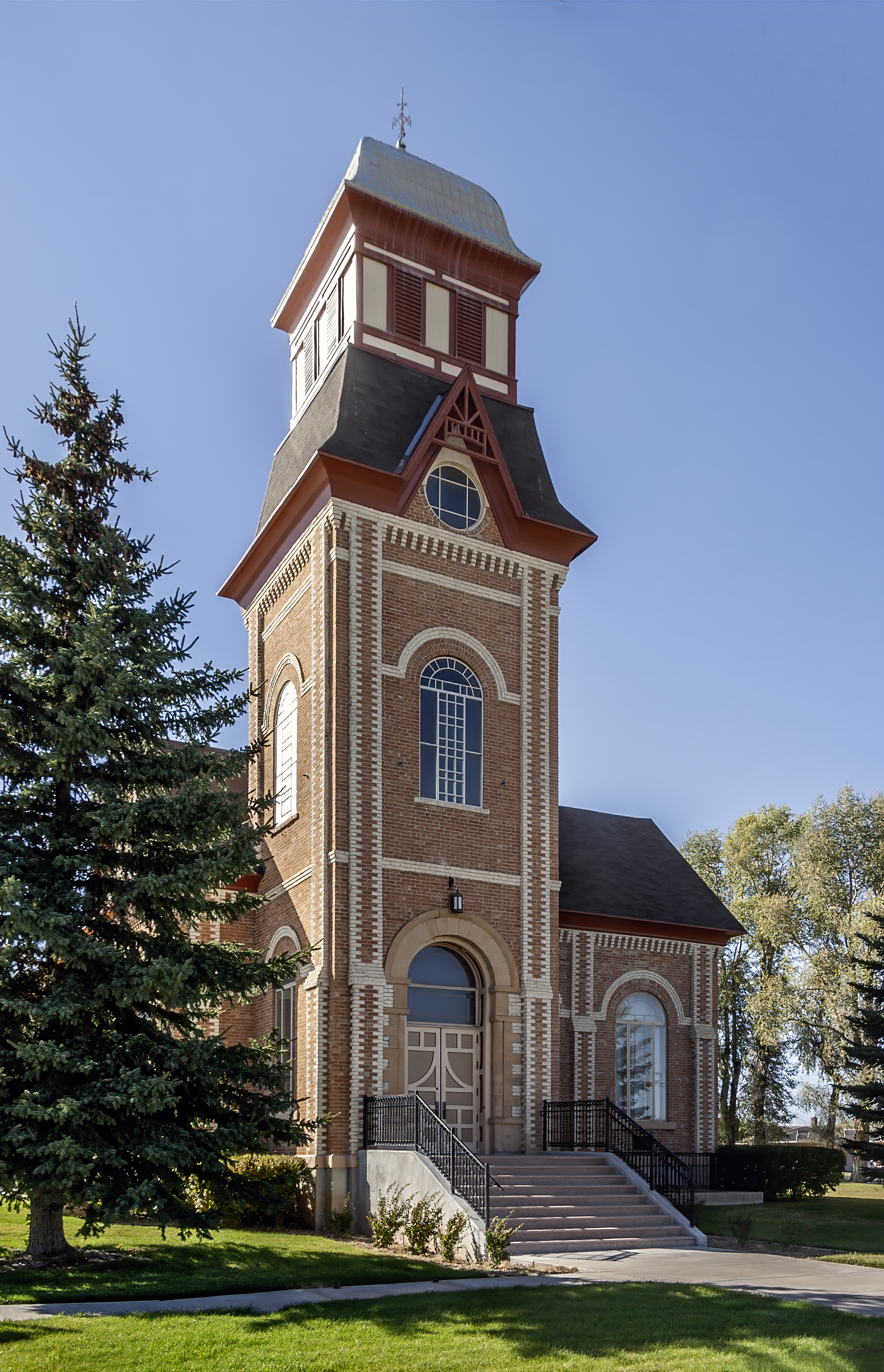
- The Randolph Tabernacle in 2010

- Location within Utah Location within the United States
- Location: 25 S. Main Street, Randolph, Utah
- Coordinates: 41°39′55″N 111°11′6″W
- Built: 1898-1914
- Architect: John C. Gray
- Architectural style: Victorian Eclectic
- NRHP reference No.: 86000724
- Added to NRHP: April 10, 1986

The Randolph Tabernacle is a Victorian-styled meetinghouse for the Randolph Ward (congregation) of the Church of Jesus Christ of Latter-day Saints (LDS Church) and is located in Randolph, Rich County, Utah. It was listed on the National Register of Historic Places on April 10, 1986.

== Construction ==
On July 5, 1898, after the creation of the Woodruff Stake, it was decided to build a large meetinghouse for the Randolph Ward that could accommodate people from small outlying communities. Given that the meetinghouse was to be built and used primarily by the Randolph Ward (one congregation) and not multiple congregations within the Woodruff Stake, it is technically not a tabernacle, but a meetinghouse, though its size and elaborate architectural style may be why it has been known colloquially as the Randolph Tabernacle. Members of the Randolph Ward provided almost all of the cost of the building, which by some estimates was around $24,000. The brick walls were complete by 1901 and the roof was finished in 1902. In November 1904, the building was in usable condition and the first meeting was held. The two-story tower was completed in 1909. The building was dedicated on July 26, 1914, by then-LDS Apostle George Albert Smith. The architect, John C. Gray, also served as the bishop of Randolph Ward from 1901 to 1921.

== Modifications ==
Minor renovations occurred in 1936 and 1977. An extensive renovation took place between 1984 and 1985, which included a large rear addition for classrooms, a cultural hall, and offices. The meetinghouse remains in use by the Randolph Ward.
