= Hell Camp: Teen Nightmare =

- Directed by: Liza Williams
- Distributed by: Netflix
- Release date: December 27, 2023
- Running time: 90 Minutes

Hell Camp: Teen Nightmare is a 2023 true crime documentary film directed by Liza Williams. The subject of the documentary is a series of troubled teen programs run by Steve Cartisano.

The documentary was released on December 27, 2023, on Netflix.

== Plot ==
The film focuses on the Challenger Wilderness Therapy Program founded by Steve Cartisano. The program includes a 63-day and 500-mile hike through deserts of Utah, wherein several troubled teens are sent by their parents, leading to disastrous results. The documentary also features Paris Hilton talking about her abuse in similar programs, which have received allegations of abuse, sexual assault, and trauma.

== Reception ==
John Anderson of The Wall Street Journal praised the film, stating that it effectively establishes the ongoing relevance of its subject matter. Anderson highlights that the film, with lawyerly caution, demonstrates how the industry in which Cartisano was a pioneer continues to flourish and has never been very closely scrutinized. Stuart Heritage of The Guardian called it "astonishing documentary"..."a troubling look at institutionalized abuse."

== See also ==
- Children of Darkness
- The Program: Cons, Cults, and Kidnapping
- Kidnapped for Christ
