= Into the Abyss (film) =

2011 documentary film

- Directed by: Werner Herzog
- Written by: Werner Herzog
- Produced by: Erik Nelson
- Starring: Werner Herzog; Michael Perry; Jason Burkett
- Narrated by: Werner Herzog
- Cinematography: Peter Zeitlinger
- Edited by: Joe Bini
- Music by: Mark Degli Antoni
- Production companies: ID Films; Creative Differences; Skellig Rock; Spring Films; Werner Herzog Film; More4; Revolver Entertainment
- Distributed by: IFC Films; Sundance Selects
- Release dates: September 8, 2011 (TIFF); November 11, 2011 (United States)
- Running time: 105 minutes
- Countries: United States; United Kingdom; Germany
- Language: English
- Box office: $393,714

Into the Abyss (subtitled A Tale of Death, a Tale of Life) is a 2011 documentary film written and directed by Werner Herzog. It is about capital punishment, and focuses on a triple homicide that occurred in Montgomery County, Texas, in 2001. In the film, Herzog interviews the two young men convicted of the crime, Michael Perry (who received a death sentence) and Jason Burkett (who was given a life sentence), as well as family members and acquaintances of the victims and criminals, and individuals who have taken part in executions in Texas. The primary focus of the film is not the details of the case or the question of Michael and Jason's guilt or innocence, and, although Herzog's voice can be heard as he conducts the interviews, there is a minimal amount of narration. He never appears onscreen, unlike in many of his films.

The film was first screened on September 3, 2011, at the Telluride Film Festival, and had its official world premiere on September 8 at the Toronto International Film Festival. After strong festival showings and a surge of interest in the issue of capital punishment in the United States, Herzog requested that the film be rushed into general theatrical release, which occurred on November 11, 2011.

== Synopsis ==
On October 24, 2001, 50-year-old nurse Sandra Stotler was murdered in her house in a gated community outside of Conroe, Texas, and her body was dumped in a nearby lake. A few days later, Michael Perry and Jason Burkett, both 19 years old, were arrested for Sandra's murder, and details in Michael's confession led law enforcement to the bodies of Sandra's grandson Adam (who Sandra was raising) and Adam's friend Jeremy Richardson, who were killed the same day as Sandra, but in a different location.

According to a representative of the Montgomery County Sheriff's Department, Michael and Jason, who were acquaintances of Adam and Jeremy, murdered Sandra to steal her car, but found themselves locked out of her gated community when they returned after dumping her body, so they waited for Adam and killed him and Jeremy, who was with Adam, for Adam's gate-opener. They then stole both Sandra and Adam's cars and proceeded to give their friends joyrides, saying they had won the lottery. Michael received a death sentence, while Jason, thanks, in part, to an emotional appeal from his father (who had been incarcerated for most of Jason's life), was given a life sentence.

In 2010, Herzog, who openly states that he is against capital punishment, interviewed Michael and Jason in prison. Michael's interview was conducted on death row, just eight days before he was executed on July 1, 2010. Both men deny they were involved in the killings. The film also includes interviews with Sandra's daughter/Adam's aunt, Jeremy's brother (who feels guilty for introducing Jeremy to his killers), Jason's father (who is imprisoned in the same facility as Jason) and wife (who met Jason while he was imprisoned and has somehow managed to become pregnant with his child), a couple of people who knew Jason and Michael, a police officer who had been part of the murder investigation, and a chaplain and former death house worker (who retired after participating in the execution of Karla Faye Tucker) who had both taken part in many executions.

== Production ==
Herzog had long considered making a film about prison intending to make his first film about the maximum-security Straubing prison in Bavaria at age 17. Although this concept was never realized, the idea informed his decision to make Into the Abyss decades later.

The film was financed by American cable TV channel Investigation Discovery, which gave Herzog creative freedom. Herzog originally planned and shot profiles of five death-row inmates in Texas and Florida, one of which was Michael Perry. After production began, Herzog decided to turn Perry's case into a feature-length documentary, while the other interviews were compiled into a series of four 50-minute films that aired as the first season of the television miniseries On Death Row.

The project went through several working titles. For a time, it was called Werner Herzog’s Final Confessions, and then simply Death Row, which became Gazing Into The Abyss: A Tale of Death, a Tale Of Life. Certain voices in the production wanted the film's title to be The Red Camaro, referring to one of the cars stolen by the killers, but Herzog disliked the hint of product placement in that title, and called it "not evocative at all". By August 2011, when the film's premiere at TIFF was announced, the title had been changed to Into the Abyss. Herzog has commented that Into the Abyss could have worked well as the title of many of his films.

The film was in production during promotion for Herzog's previous film, Cave of Forgotten Dreams. He missed a special screening of Cave of Forgotten Dreams at the Berlinale festival because an opportunity to film one of his subjects for this film arose suddenly.

== Release and distribution ==
Into the Abyss premiered on September 8, 2011, at the Toronto International Film Festival. It was described as being one of several "hot-button political documentaries" at the festival that year, but Herzog stated that he had no political intentions with the film. While he states in the film that he opposes capital punishment, he has stated that the film is not part of some crusade, as he is "not in the business of guilt or innocence. My focus is elsewhere." He elaborated in an interview with the Los Angeles Times, saying: "This is not an issue film; it's not an activist film against capital punishment [...] yes, it has an issue, but it's not the main purpose of the film."

Before the film's festival premiere, its North American theatrical distribution rights were bought by Sundance Selects. When the execution of Troy Davis and the cheers for Rick Perry's execution record during a Republican primary presidential debate brought attention the issue of capital punishment in the United States, Herzog pushed for the film to be rushed into theatrical release, and, even though Cave of Forgotten Dreams was still in theaters, Sundance Selects announced in October 2011 that the film would open in select cities on November 11. As producer Erik Nelson said: "everyone in the country is focused on the death penalty debate again thanks to Rick Perry and the bloodthirsty yahoos at the Republican debate, and I think Werner wants the film to be part of that discussion because timing is everything."

After its theatrical release, the film was shown on Investigation Discovery. For a time, it was available for on-demand video streaming on Netflix.

== Reception ==
The film received positive reviews. On review aggregator website Rotten Tomatoes, it has an approval rating of 92% based on reviews from 117 critics, with an average score of 7.8/10; the site's "critics consensus" reads: "Another probing, insightful look at an interesting subject, Werner Herzog explores the American prison system with passion and not politics." On Metacritic, the film has a weighted average score of 74 out of 100 based on 30 reviews.

Roger Ebert placed the film third on his list of the 20 best documentaries of 2011.

=== Awards ===
- 2011 BFI London Film Festival – Best Documentary

== See also ==
- List of people executed in Texas, 2010–2019
- List of people executed in the United States in 2010
