= Michael Perry and Jason Burkett =

American spree killers

Michael Perry
- Perry shortly before his execution
- Born: Michael James Perry; April 9, 1982; Harris County, Texas, U.S.
- Died: July 1, 2010 (aged 28); Huntsville Unit, Huntsville, Texas, U.S.
- Cause of death: Execution by lethal injection
- Status: Executed
- Motive: Robbery; Eliminating witnesses
- Conviction: Capital murder
- Penalty: Death

Details
- Victims: Sandra Stotler, 50; Adam Stotler, 16; Jeremy Richardson, 18
- Date: October 24, 2001
- Country: United States
- State: Texas
- Weapon: Shotgun
- Date apprehended: October 27, 2001

Jason Burkett
- Burkett (c. 2017)
- Born: Jason Aaron Burkett; July 31, 1982 (age 44); Texas, U.S.
- Status: Incarcerated
- Motive: Robbery; Eliminating witnesses
- Convictions: Capital murder Aggravated assault of a police officer
- Penalty: Life imprisonment (minimum of 40 years)

Details
- Victims: Sandra Stotler, 50; Adam Stotler, 16; Jeremy Richardson, 18
- Date: October 24, 2001
- Country: United States
- State: Texas
- Weapon: Shotgun
- Date apprehended: October 27, 2001
- Imprisoned at: Polunsky Unit

Michael James Perry (April 9, 1982 – July 1, 2010) and Jason Aaron Burkett (born July 31, 1982) were American spree killers who killed three people in Texas in 2001. They were both tried and convicted of capital murder for the killings. Perry was sentenced to death and executed in 2010, while Burkett received a life sentence. Their cases were later the subject of Werner Herzog's 2011 documentary Into the Abyss.

== Backgrounds ==
=== Michael Perry ===
Perry's biological mother was a teenager who gave him up for adoption at birth. His adoptive parents were caring, but had great difficulty controlling him, and got him into a counseling course in the Florida Everglades. After Perry dropped out and started stealing from his adoptive parents, they admitted him to various reform schools and therapy programs, all of which were unsuccessful. In an interview years later, Perry said, "I had opportunity after opportunity and I wasted them and rebelled. That's one of the reasons why I got the death penalty."

In 1st grade, Perry was diagnosed with attention deficit hyperactivity disorder. In 7th grade, he was diagnosed with oppositional defiant disorder. In 8th grade, he was diagnosed with conduct disorder. Perry was admitted to a mental hospital twice. He did not qualify for special education classes in elementary school.

Perry became a truant in middle school. He left home and returned whenever he felt like it. He also stole his mother's jewelry and tried to sell it, stole and crashed his family's van, and broke into a neighbor's home. During this time, Perry received counseling from psychologists and psychiatrists.

In 1997, Perry was sent to Boys Town, a reform school founded by Edward J. Flanagan in Nebraska. Three months later, he threatened an official there, saying, "You know, you people work here. I don’t know why you work here. People like me who are going to rape or kill your kids, you know." Perry was then sent to the locked section of the facility for four months. He did not meet the requirements for the mental health treatment provided at the facility.

Perry's adoptive parents eventually sent him to a private residential treatment program in Mexico called Casa by the Sea which housed many other American youths with behavioral problems. Perry dropped out when he was 18, and the facility was shut down by the Mexican government in 2004.

Perry ended up homeless in San Diego, California. "I had no clue how to look after myself, I tried to get a job, I had no ID, I had no idea, I had nothing," he later said. An older man invited him off the street to a drug-fueled party, then offered him a place to stay. "Basically I became a rent boy. As embarrassing as this is, if I had the choice between starving to death on the streets or selling myself I'm going to sell myself," he said.

Perry became addicted to drugs and stole and sold prescription pills to feed his addiction. He returned to Texas after his adoptive parents told him he could still move back home with them if he got a job, but he did not take up their proposition. He continued to steal and sell pills and other items.

=== Jason Burkett ===
Burkett's mother used methamphetamine while she was pregnant and neglected her children, often leaving the oldest sibling to look over the family. The family lived in poor conditions and got food via food stamps. Burkett's father, Delbert, was a career criminal who abused him and the rest of his family. As a child, Burkett witnessed his father abuse his mother, and witnessed him shoot her with a pellet gun, and rape her on at least one occasion. Burkett was also physically abused by his older siblings. Despite his father's abuse, Jason thought highly of him.

== Murders ==
Perry and Burkett met and became friends shortly before the murders.

On May 22, 2001, Perry was arrested after shooting at a house. On October 2, 2001, he was arrested after trying to present a fake prescription for Xanax.

On October 24, 2001, Perry and Burkett, both then 19, decided they needed new cars. They went to the home where 50-year-old Sandra Stotler lived with her 16-year-old son and Perry's acquaintance, Adam Stotler. They targeted the Stotlers since they knew they were rich and had "a newer Camaro and Isuzu Rodeo." The two devised a plan to ask Sandra to spend the night there and then steal her Camaro while they were asleep. Perry and Burkett arrived at her home in the late evening, driving the truck of Burkett's girlfriend. Sandra told them that her son would not be home for another two hours.

Perry and Burkett started to leave but then decided to steal the car while Sandra was home. They parked their truck down the street and walked back to Sandra's home. Burkett distracted Sandra while Perry, armed with a shotgun, snuck inside. He hid inside the laundry room and knocked on the back door, shooting Sandra when she responded. When Sandra, still alive, tried to get up, Perry shot her a second time. He and Burkett then covered her body with sheets, and Burkett loaded it into his truck. Perry wanted to steal the Camaro, but could not find the keys. The two drove off and disposed of the body in a nearby lake. They then drove to Conroe, Texas and picked up Burkett's girlfriend, Kristen Willis.

The group returned to Sandra's community, which was gated. They did not know the code and decided to wait for Adam. While they were waiting, they devised a plan to tell Adam that a friend of theirs had accidentally shot himself in the woods and that they needed help. Adam arrived in the Isuzu Rodeo with his friend, 18-year-old Jeremy Richardson. Perry and Burkett asked for help and drove out to the woods with Adam and Jeremy following. The four got out, while Willis stayed in the truck. Adam suggested that they search from a different road, and he and Perry drove away.

According to Perry's initial confession, Burkett approached them, alone, with a shotgun after Adam parked. Burkett, who had fatally shot Richardson earlier, asked them if they heard gunshots. He told Adam he would take him to the others, and Adam followed him. Perry went back to the car and saw Burkett shoot Adam three times. Perry then stole Adam's car keys from his body. The two drove the Rodeo. Willis became upset and drove home, so Burkett drove Perry back to Sandra's home. Perry stole Adam's wallet and car keys and drove off with the Camaro. Perry and Burkett then went home, cleaned up evidence, and went to a nightclub.

On October 26, Perry was driving the Camaro when police saw him commit a traffic violation. After a police chase which resulted in Perry wrecking the car, he fled on foot. He was arrested and booked as Adam Stotler, whose wallet he still had, and released on bond.

Sandra's body was found on October 27. Two days later, Perry threatened Willis with a loaded shotgun and told her to not talk about the murders. "I have already killed somebody, it's not going to hurt me to kill anyone else," he said.

Three days later, a sheriff spotted Adam's stolen car at a truck stop. Perry and Burkett were inside. They struck the sheriff while fleeing, but the officer managed to shoot out a rear tire. The vehicle crashed, Perry sustained a severe cut to his arm, and Burkett fled on foot. They were arrested shortly after. Under interrogation, Perry confessed to the murders.

While in jail awaiting trial, Perry was unruly. On one occasion, he became belligerent and had to be restrained. Perry tried to bite an officer who was restraining him.

== Trials, Perry's execution, and aftermath ==
To simplify the cases against them, Perry and Burkett were each only tried on one count of capital murder. Perry was tried for killing Sandra Stotler, and Burkett was tried for killing Jeremy Richardson, with the prosecution seeking death sentences for both of them. Willis was granted complete immunity in exchange for testifying against Perry and Burkett. During her testimony, she said she was scared of Burkett. Perry later tried to imply that Willis had gotten a deal since her father was a cop.

In February 2003, Perry was found guilty of capital murder after the jury deliberated for two hours. Among the evidence was Perry's DNA on a cigarette butt underneath one of the victims. The jury deliberated another six hours before deciding that Perry deserved to be executed. During the trial, Perry said he was innocent and claimed his confession had been coerced."

In October 2003, Burkett was also found guilty of capital murder. During the sentencing phase, psychologists and family members testified about his dysfunctional upbringing. The defense had Delbert Burkett brought from prison to testify. Delbert begged the jury to spare his son's life, saying he had been a horrible father who failed his son and his family. After Delbert left the courtroom, two women broke down in tears. Jason would be spared execution by two votes.

Recounting his father's testimony years later, Jason said it was the only time that he became emotional during the trial. "The hardest part was for him to look at me and it seemed that he was sincere that he really was sorry for, you know, what he had done throughout my childhood," he said. "He had been in prison. I don't blame him for it, but I've seen right there that he understood that it did affect us. I cried that one day and that was it. The whole trial, even after the conviction, the only thing that hurt me was my dad."

Lisa Balloun, Sandra Stotler's daughter, was not swayed by the history of Burkett's childhood abuse, neglect, and drug addiction. She said that while she did not necessarily want Perry or Burkett to be put to death, she thought the alternative, life in prison with parole eligibility after 40 years (Texas did not have life without parole at the time of the murders) was too lenient, and that all the testimony proved to her was that Burkett was irreparably broken.

Perry continued to maintain his innocence on death row. Shortly before his execution, the case became the subject of Werner Herzog's documentary, Into the Abyss. Herzog said he reviewed the case beforehand, and that the proof of guilt in the case was overwhelming.

Perry was executed by lethal injection at the Huntsville Unit on July 1, 2010. Perry's last words were, "Yes, I want to start off by saying to everyone know that's involved in this atrocity that they are all forgiven by me. Mom, I love you..... I am ready to go Warden. Coming home dad, coming home dad" (Perry's adoptive father had died a few weeks earlier). Perry cried as he spoke.

After Perry's execution, Stotler's daughter, Lisa Stotler Balloun, said she took no joy in Perry's death and expressed sympathy for his family. However, she felt that his final declaration of innocence affirmed the jury's recommendation of death. "I needed to look into his eyes and see if he was the monster I had made him out to be, because he was just a 19-year-old kid at the time," she said. "When he said that, I knew that he was. I knew that justice had been served."

Burkett has made several appeals, all of which have been unsuccessful. In 2018, his girlfriend was arrested for trying to mail him meth. Burkett will become eligible for parole on November 1, 2041.

Before his parole, Delbert Burkett was in a prison across the street from his son. He had been serving a 40-year sentence for indecency with a child. Delbert Burkett died on June 6, 2022, at the age of 66.

== See also ==
- Capital punishment in Texas
- List of people executed in Texas, 2010–2019
- List of people executed in the United States in 2010
