= Death of Martin Anderson =

2006 killing of a boy in a Florida detention center

- Date: January 5–6, 2006
- Accused: 8
- Convicted: None

Martin Lee Anderson (c. January 15, 1991 – January 6, 2006) was a 14-year-old from Florida who died while incarcerated at a boot camp-style youth detention center, the Bay County Boot Camp, located in Panama City, Florida, and operated by the Bay County Sheriff's Office. Upon arriving at the camp he was forced to run track, and within two hours he became fatigued and stopped. The guards beat him to force him to continue his run. He returned to the track, collapsed and died a short while later. A portion of the surveillance video depicting the beating was made public. The video failed to support the police account that Anderson had been non-compliant. The incident resulted in the Florida legislature voting to close the state's five juvenile boot camps.

== Circumstances ==
On January 5, 2006, within the first two hours of Anderson's first day at the camp, where he had been committed for stealing his grandmother's car, curfew violation during probation, and theft of candy, he was required to run track. After he had stopped from fatigue, camp officials forced him to continue exercising, by kneeing and hitting him. Drill instructors grabbed Anderson and applied numerous uses of force, including holding Anderson by the arms, take-downs, and pressure point applications, as well as multiple knees and strikes to his back. Anderson became unresponsive during this episode, and the guards administered ammonia salts in an attempt to revive him. He was taken to a hospital for treatment, where he died the next day in Pensacola, Florida after his parents elected to remove him from life support.

== Investigation ==
An investigation into the teen's death began immediately, as a cooperative effort of the Florida Department of Law Enforcement (FDLE), the state Department of Juvenile Justice, and the Bay County Sheriff's Department.

On February 18, 2006, State Attorney Steve Meadows, whose jurisdiction includes Bay County, appealed to Florida Governor Jeb Bush for the case to be reassigned from his office. In his letter, Meadows admitted "close ties" to FDLE chief Guy Tunnell, who had been serving as Bay County sheriff when he opened the boot camp where Anderson later died.

Bush appointed Hillsborough County State Attorney Mark Ober to oversee the case. It was still open as of November 2024 and under his supervision.

On November 28, 2006, authorities announced the arrest of eight people in connection with Anderson's death. Seven guards and a nurse were charged with aggravated manslaughter of a child, a felony. They were all later acquitted of the charges.

On April 16, 2010, the U.S. Department of Justice stated that no federal criminal civil rights charges would be filed against the eight people who were originally charged in Anderson's death. The press release included the following:

"After a careful and thorough review, a team of experienced federal prosecutors and FBI agents determined that the evidence was insufficient to pursue federal criminal civil rights charges. Accordingly, the investigation into this incident has been closed."

=== Two autopsies ===
On January 9, FDLE officials announced that Anderson's autopsy ruled out "trauma or injury" as the cause of his death.

The official cause of death was not reported for another five weeks. In mid-February, Bay County Medical Examiner Charles F. Siebert announced that his first autopsy of Anderson determined that the Black teen died of complications from sickle cell trait, a relatively common condition among African Americans.

A Florida statute allows a medical examiner to return a body to the jurisdiction where the incident occurred. Ober cleared Siebert of any wrongdoing in bringing the body back to Bay County.

On March 12, Anderson's body was exhumed and a second autopsy was conducted by the coroner of Hillsborough County, Dr. Vernard Adams. This time, the autopsy was attended by several other forensic pathologists as consultants to Adams. Dr. Michael Baden, New York State Police coroner, attended at the request of Anderson's parents and the NAACP.

Dr. Adams' findings:

1) The repeated blows to Martin Anderson's limbs and the gripping of his limbs left several bruises but did not contribute to his death. In other words, he was not beaten to death.

2) Martin Anderson's death was caused by suffocation due to actions of the guards at the boot camp. The suffocation was caused by manual occlusion of the mouth, in concert with forced inhalation of ammonia fumes that caused spasm of the vocal cords resulting in internal blockage of the upper airway.

The results of the second autopsy were announced by the State Attorney, Marc Ober, on May 6. Adams said that Anderson's death was caused by suffocation due to actions of the guards. A lack of oxygen was caused by holding his mouth closed while forcing him to inhale ammonia fumes. The video shows guards holding the capsules in Anderson's face repeatedly.

== Controversy and criticism ==
Many of the major figures in the Anderson investigation have been criticized by Anderson's family, youth advocates, civil-rights and anti-detention groups, as well as state and national media outlets.

Immediately after observing Adams' 12-hour autopsy, Baden said, "Preliminary findings indicate the boy did not die from sickle cell trait, nor did he die from natural causes." Dr. Baden has said repeatedly that sickle trait by itself does not cause death. He explained a "sickle cell crisis" is a sickle cell disease—not the same as sickle cell trait. By itself, the sickle cell trait is not harmful. People with sickle cell trait can lead perfectly healthy lives. But beyond that, he said, hospital records indicate Anderson's blood was not sickled until the moment at which he started to die.

Other medical examiners disagreed and noted that sickle cell trait had been found to contribute to exertional deaths. The consensus has resulted in military services of the UK and US changing certain practices in training to protect trainees.

A 1996 study found people with sickle cell trait have a four thousand percent increased incidence of sudden death when put in a boot camp environment. The risk of sudden death in boot camp environments for people with sickle trait has long been recognized in military services. Some military services, such as Great Britain, chose to limit activities of people with sickle trait. The US military, in contrast, changed its boot camp procedures to lessen the probability of exertional death (Armed Forces Epidemiological Board, Memorandum 2003-004 Screening for Sickle Cell Disease at Accession). Recent studies have shown that laboratory specimens falsely underestimate the degree of sickling in the blood. Dr. Jon Thogmartin, the Pinellas-Pasco medical examiner said, "Michael Baden saying it [sickle cell trait] does not harm you—considering the literature, he may as well have walked out and said the world is flat."

In June 2007 the National Athletic Trainers' Association released a consensus statement noting that approximately 5 percent of exertional deaths in young healthy athletes were from exertional sickling in those with sickle cell trait.

According to Adams, "Martin Anderson's death was caused by suffocation due to actions of the guards at the boot camp. The suffocation was caused by manual occlusion of the mouth, in concert with forced inhalation of ammonia fumes that caused spasm of the vocal cords resulting in internal blockage of the upper airway." Death due to laryngospasm, however, is not listed in standard lists of adverse effects. Dr. Randy Eichner noted in his testimony that such a death had never been recorded in 150 years of use of ammonia spirits. Dr. Adams did not dispute this:

Defense attorney Waylon Graham asked him why he thought the use of ammonia could have killed Anderson when nothing like that has ever been recorded "in the history of the world."

"This is the only place in the world to my knowledge where ammonia capsules were used this way," Adams said. "So no other deaths would have occurred."

A number of forensic pathologists support Siebert's diagnosis. Steve Meadows, the State Attorney who succeeded Ober, concluded that the criticism of Siebert was politically motivated. When the Medical Examiner Commission voted not to retain Siebert following the expiration of his contract, Meadows appointed Siebert into the position as temporary Medical Examiner. Meadows stated: "I will not sacrifice Charles Siebert on the altar of political expediency or correctness. Despite what amounts to a reckless character assassination by some media outlets and, regrettably, even some members of our government, I believe Dr. Siebert to be a competent and thorough medical examiner–not beholden to anyone or any cause. Quite simply, Dr. Siebert is a well-qualified doctor doing his best to serve the people of this district. I am certain that Dr. Siebert looks forward to a hearing before an administrative judge and his first opportunity to respond to the allegations upon which the vote for his removal was based."

=== Medical examiner criticized ===
Charles F. Siebert, the Bay County medical examiner who performed Anderson's first autopsy and ruled out foul play, faced charges of professional incompetence but ultimately was exonerated. Siebert's critics and the media made much of the 2004 report of an autopsy he performed on 34-year-old Donna Reed, a female who died during Hurricane Ivan, because it noted that Reed's testicles and prostate were "unremarkable".

On August 9, 2006, the state Medical Examiners Commission recommended probation, which was not upheld. Originally, a panel from the Commission recommended that Siebert be suspended, after an inquiry discovered that he was negligent in at least 35 of 698 cases reviewed. But none of these findings was related to cause or manner of death. While the newspapers used the word "negligent," the Medical Examiners Commission did not accuse him of negligence. The commission decided to retain Siebert until his contract expired June 27, 2007, with the provision that he pay for outside review of his future work (a QA program).

The National Association of Medical Examiners (NAME), concerned that Siebert was being subjected to a "witch hunt", took the unusual step of writing to the Medical Examiner Commission to offer its services to remedy the situation. The Medical Examiner Commission did not respond to the NAME letter. On January 15, 2007, NAME followed up with a second statement of its concerns.

On January 18, 2007, the Medical Examiner Commission and Siebert reached a negotiated agreement in which the Medical Examiner Commission removed all references to "probation" or "discipline" and Siebert agreed to institute a quality assurance program to look for typographical errors in reports. Siebert was not required to accept the claims of error, and is free to pursue other remedies. In July 2007, Dr. Joseph Prahlow, president of NAME, noted that "consensus [among Medical Examiners] nationally, however, is that Siebert is being singled out for political purposes." He said that "the more vocal members of the national society of forensic pathologists support Siebert. He was careful to point out that the most vocal didn't necessarily represent the majority of members, and very few have examined both autopsy reports."

On August 3, 2007, Dr. Vincent DiMaio, retired Chief Medical Examiner for San Antonio and author of two best-selling textbooks of forensic pathology stated that Siebert's conclusions were scientifically valid and that Adams' was not. Some weeks later Dr. John Hunsaker, former President of the National Association of Medical Examiners, also asserted this opinion in a radio interview. Dr. Randy Eichner, team doctor for the University of Oklahoma Sooners and expert on exertional deaths, called Adams' conclusions "fantasy."

In late 2007, the Medical Examiner Commission asked for a delay in Siebert's appeal in order to finish some depositions. This delayed the appeal until after January 1, 2008, and Siebert's contract ended December 28, 2007. The local search committee for a new ME requested a delay in Dr.Siebert's departure in order to allow his appeal to be heard, but the Medical Examiner Commission refused, thus making the appeal impossible. Since Siebert was no longer a Medical Examiner, he no longer had standing for an appeal. Dr. Jon Thogmartin, Siebert's primary supporter in the Medical Examiner Commission, was replaced with Dr. Bruce Hyma, the Miami-Dade Medical Examiner. Hyma in turn asked that Siebert be allowed his day in court, and was denied. Hyma was also a member of the local search committee for a new District 14 Medical Examiner. The local search committee put Siebert's name in as their recommendation for the position. The Medical Examiner Commission refused to honor that nomination and instead left the position open as of December 29, 2007. In response to this, NAME wrote its third open letter, stating:

"As an organization, we believe that Dr. Siebert has met [the NAME] autopsy standards, and he continues to be a NAME member in good standing. By continuing to imply that Dr. Siebert does not meet the aforementioned nonexistent "NAME guidelines" or the NAME Autopsy Standards, the MEC is dishonestly misrepresenting the facts. Furthermore, as these errors have not been publicly acknowledged by the MEC, the MEC is discrediting not only Dr. Siebert but NAME itself. Since the MEC apparently believes that falsely invoking the imprimatur of the National Association of Medical Examiners in this fashion is acceptable, the Executive Committee of NAME demands that the MEC officially acknowledge and make public retraction of the inconsistencies noted above."...

In light of all that has happened, it appears inappropriate for the MEC to deny the request of the local 14th medical examiner district to defer any further action until Dr. Siebert has been afforded the opportunity through normal proceedings to both defend his findings and refute the allegations against him as due process requires. ... Imposing sanctions against a medical examiner without requiring these theories to be tested by an impartial jury jeopardizes the independent judgment of the medical examiner that our system of government has come to rely upon precisely because of its independent objective inquiry. It is ironic that in Dr. Siebert's case the medical examiner has been denied the very protection that his presence in such judicial proceedings is meant to provide.

Similarly, a group of 26 Medical Examiners from across the US and in Australia wrote an open letter to the MEC stating that the Medical Examiner system in Florida had been politically hijacked. They wrote:

Now the commission is attempting to remove Siebert and destroy his credibility. It delayed Siebert's administrative hearing until after the new year, but has refused a request from District 14 to delay the appointment of a medical examiner until after the hearing. It appears that technicalities are acceptable only when the commission uses them.

The commission has also informed the people of District 14 that it will ignore their opinion and choose someone else as chief medical examiner. The commissioners set the meeting to make this decision for Dec. 29, in the middle of the holidays. They have no shame.

This political hijacking of Florida's medical examiner system should be of concern to everyone. Without confidence in the independence of medical examiners, every decision can reasonably be questioned and unreasonably be scrutinized. Medical examiners from every corner of our country have added their names, alarmed about these events and their consequences.

In recommending Siebert for reappointment, the Bay County Board of County Commissioners wrote to the Medical Examiner Commission:

It unfortunately appears to us, and many residents of Bay County, that Dr. Siebert has become a scapegoat for those seeking a political solution to recent events, rather than a logical resolution based upon science and fact. The bottom line is that the good people of Bay County, including those serving on the local search committee, are apparently being ignored in their plea to keep Dr. Siebert as Medical Examiner.

=== Tunnell's resignation ===
FDLE Commissioner Guy Tunnell also came under fire for alleged conflicts of interest. Tunnell, the former Bay County sheriff, had originally opened the boot camp where Anderson died.

Tunnell sent e-mails to current Bay County Sheriff Frank McKeithen, detailing his agency's efforts to withhold the video tape of the incident at the boot camp that led to Anderson's death. Ober eventually removed the FDLE from the investigation.

Tunnell resigned from his post as FDLE chief in April 2006, after comments reportedly made by him about then Senator Barack Obama and Jesse Jackson were leaked to the press. In these comments he compared Jackson to Jesse James, and Obama to terrorist Osama bin Laden.

State Attorney Steve Meadows, who recused himself from the Anderson investigation, later rehired Tunnell to work on "cold case" files.

=== Sit-in and "march for justice" ===
A group of mostly local college students staged a sit-in on April 19 and 20, 2006, taking over Governor Jeb Bush's public waiting room.

The students, most of them from Tallahassee schools Florida State University, Florida A&M University and Tallahassee Community College, were demanding that Bush, among other things, order the arrest of the guards who beat Anderson and issue a public apology for delays in the investigation. Many of these students were members of Coalition of Justice for Martin Lee Anderson, who had protested throughout the trial. Among them was past Nickelodeon star Vanessa Baden, who acted as secretary and spokesperson.

The two-day sit-in was the first at Bush's office since 2000.

On April 21, the day Tunnell resigned as FDLE chief, more than 3,000 protesters staged a rally outside the Florida State Capitol, joined by Jesse Jackson and Al Sharpton, calling for the arrest of the guards and for changes in the state correctional system.

Bush returned from a trip to Iraq, Kuwait and Afghanistan late on April 19, and met with four students and several lawmakers that afternoon. The next day, Bush met with Anderson's parents. Lawmakers claimed that Bush apologized to the parents at that meeting, although that report was never confirmed by Bush or his office.

On September 27, 2006, Anderson's parents returned to Tallahassee seeking a meeting with Bush, claiming he had promised them an "open dialogue" at their meeting in April. However, Bush refused them audience.

== Public outcry ==
The death became a cause célèbre and received national attention. The local medical examiner, Dr. Charles Siebert, performed an autopsy and ruled that the teen died of "complications from sickle cell trait". He said, "It was a natural death." The Governor ordered a second autopsy; the second pathologist, Dr. Vern Adams, ruled Martin Anderson's death was "caused by suffocation due to actions of the guards at the boot camp. The suffocation was caused by manual occlusion of the mouth, in concert with forced inhalation of ammonia fumes that caused spasm of the vocal cords resulting in internal blockage of the upper airway."

Public indignation resulted in the closing of the state's five juvenile boot camps, the firing of Siebert, and charges of manslaughter against the guards. Governor Charlie Crist directed the state of Florida to settle a family lawsuit for $5 million. Eventually, the guards were acquitted at trial. The controversy regarding Siebert's firing resulted in accusations by the National Association of Medical Examiners, independent groups of medical examiners throughout the nation, the State Attorney, and the Bay County Commissioners complaining that the Florida Medical Examiner system had been compromised by racial politics.

Guy Tunnell, the FDLE commissioner, resigned after making inappropriate remarks made about African-American civil rights leaders related to the case.

== Actions taken against state/investigators ==
=== Civil-rights complaints ===
Anderson's parents and civil rights groups appealed several times to the United States Department of Justice (USDOJ), a federal agency, asking it to assist in the state investigation of Anderson's death as a violation of Anderson's civil rights under federal criminal law. The Civil Rights Division of the Department of Justice, the United States Attorney for the Northern District of Florida and the FBI joined state agencies in the investigation.

On October 12, 2007, Robert Miller, United States Attorney for the Northern District of Florida, and Acting Assistant Attorney General for the Civil Rights Division, Rena Comisac, announced that the USDOJ will make a "thorough and independent review" of the evidence concerning the death of 14-year-old Martin Lee Anderson. They were actively monitoring the state's prosecution of the boot camp personnel, and promised to take appropriate action if the evidence indicates a prosecutable criminal violation of federal civil rights statutes.

On April 16, 2010, the Department of Justice concluded that there was insufficient evidence to pursue federal criminal civil rights charges against the guards.

Tunnell was also the target of several civil rights complaints filed by citizens of Bay County and by federal lawmakers, including then U.S. Senator Hillary Clinton, with the USDOJ. None of the complaints were investigated.

=== Lawsuit ===
On July 12, 2006, Robert Anderson and Gina Jones filed a $40 million wrongful death lawsuit against the Department of Juvenile Justice and the Bay County Sheriff's Office. Anderson's parents claimed civil-rights violations were committed by both agencies and that both had conspired to cover up significant facts in the investigation, in addition to charges of negligence.

Anderson and Jones offered to settle with the sheriff for $3 million, the maximum allowed under the agency's insurance, but McKeithen refused the offer, calling a settlement "premature" before an investigation was complete. The case is pending; under state sovereign immunity law, if Anderson and Jones win their case, the state's damages would be capped at $200,000.

Florida Attorney General Charlie Crist, commenting on the case the same day, said that a $3 million settlement "might not be enough."

On October 18, 2006, U.S. District Judge Robert Hinkle set a trial date of April 16, 2007. In the same ruling, the judge dismissed the civil-rights and conspiracy charges against the Department of Juvenile Justice and Bay County Sheriff's Office, and ruled that they would not be responsible for punitive damages.

On March 14, 2007, Florida Governor Charlie Crist recommended that the state agree to pay $5 million to Anderson's family, in a deal that would allow the Anderson Family to pursue another $5 million from Bay County, Florida. The recommendation still has to pass the Florida legislature. Also on March 14, a copy of the video, enhanced by NASA was made public.

On March 28, 2007, Bay County, Florida agreed to settle with Anderson's family for $2.4 million.

=== Arrests and trial ===
On November 28, 2006, seven guards (Henry Dickens, Charles Enfinger, Patrick Garrett, Raymond Hauck, Charles Helms Jr., Henry McFadden Jr., and Joseph Walsh II) and a nurse, Kristin Schmidt (who was present during the incident but took no action) were arrested on charges of aggravated manslaughter of a child, a felony. When the eight defendants were arraigned on January 18, 2007, they entered "not guilty" pleas. Circuit Judge Michael Overstreet set a pre-trial hearing date for Feb. 22. Subsequently, they were freed on $25,000 bail.

The criminal trial was set for October 3, 2007, in the courtroom of Circuit Judge Michael Overstreet. The defendants each faced 30 years if convicted of the top charge, aggravated manslaughter of a person under 18. However, the jury could decide on a lesser offense. The primary dispute in the case was over the cause of Anderson's death.

"This was no accident that this child was killed," assistant state attorney Pam Bondi told jurors. "The evidence will show that by what these eight defendants did and by what they failed to do, that boy lost his life." Bondi said Anderson died of oxygen deprivation after guards manhandled him and used excessive amounts of ammonia capsules when he became unresponsive while the nurse stood by and watched. Defense attorneys said in opening statements that they would show Anderson's death could not have been prevented and was caused solely by sickle cell trait.

On the second day of the trial, Dr. Thomas Andrew, who is Chief Medical Examiner of New Hampshire, said Martin Lee Anderson died as a result of the boot camp guards' actions. He said that everything combined, including the stress of the encounter and the physical exertion of the run, aggravated Anderson's sickle-cell condition, hampering the flow of oxygen in his blood. "But for these defendants' actions, would Martin Anderson have died?" assistant state attorney Scott Harmon asked. "I would have to say no," Andrew said. He also said that, had the guards given Anderson the opportunity to recover from the run, his death might have been prevented.

On the third day of the trial, Dr. Vernard Adams said that Anderson died from suffocation at the hands of eight boot camp employees. The doctor said the lack of oxygen prevented Anderson's blood from producing carbon dioxide, leading to a build-up of lactic acid in his blood that ultimately put him in an irreversible coma. The pathologist acknowledged that the teen's sickle-cell condition aggravated the circumstances by further impeding the flow of oxygen. He insisted, however, that the guards' actions alone would have been enough to kill even a teen who did not have sickle-cell trait. From a toxicologist, Cynthia Lewis-Younger, the jury learned the highly concentrated ammonia capsules the guards used on Anderson were not approved by the Food and Drug Administration for use on children. Acknowledging that no deaths have been reported from their use, she said that potential could not be ruled out.

The prosecution case was hampered by a shifting theory on the medical cause of death. The prosecution proposed that Mr. Anderson died of improper use of force, then of suffocation, then of failure to act. The fact that the two prosecution medical expert witnesses proposed different causes of death was also problematic.

In contrast, the opinions by the defense experts did not contradict. Dr. Siebert stood by his diagnosis. Dr. Randy Eichner, expert on exertional sickle cell trait deaths, testified that Dr. Siebert's conclusions were correct. He noted that exertional sickle crisis in sickle cell trait has a 70 percent mortality, and that the video described a classic example of an exertional sickle cell death. He called the claim of laryngospasm a red herring, and noted that no case of ammonia salt-related death has been described in 150 years of use. In the end, the prosecution encouraged the jury to ignore the medical evidence altogether.

On Monday defense attorney Walter Smith said "This is a death that would have resulted whether or not the defendants used ammonia or struck him. They did not cause the death of Martin Lee Anderson. The death of Martin Lee Anderson resulted from natural causes."

Smith said the guards were merely following the policies of the Department of Juvenile Justice, the state agency that ran the boot camp program, and acting in accordance with boot camp policy. He blamed Anderson's death on complications from sickle-cell trait. Earlier in the day, prosecutors had called the chief medical director of Florida's Department of Juvenile Justice, who testified there was no outlined procedure for the use of ammonia capsules in the boot camp's policy manual, and someone with sickle cell trait would not have been excluded from the program.

Nurse Kristin Schmidt said she did not find any signs of medical distress at any time; Anderson was breathing "fine" on his own but not complying with the guards' orders.

In closing arguments Thursday, Hillsborough County assistant state attorney Michael Sinacore told jurors a desire for "control and domination," without a concern for safety, drove the actions of eight former boot camp employees. "They needed to control him. They needed to dominate him and they crossed the line by a long shot." Their goal became to get Martin Anderson to do what they wanted him to do, and all their actions are consistent with that," he said.

After deliberating for 90 minutes, the jury found all defendants not guilty in the death of Martin Lee Anderson. Soon after the verdict was read, the U.S. Attorney for the Northern District of Florida, Gregory Robert Miller, and Acting Assistant Attorney General for the Civil Rights Division, Rena Comisac, announced that the Department of Justice will make a "thorough and independent review" of the evidence concerning the death of 14-year-old Martin Lee Anderson. They have been actively monitoring the state's prosecution of the boot camp personnel, and promised to take appropriate action if the evidence indicates a prosecutable criminal violation of federal civil rights statutes.

Comments on the verdict

Dr. Siebert stated that he felt vindicated by the result.

"I think finally people were looking at the science, looking at the facts, and not just an emotional video," he said. "Because of all the political pressure, because of the racial undertones and because of the special-interest groups, a lot of the true facts hadn't come out yet."

Henry Dickens, one of the black guards, was particularly troubled by what he perceived as racial attacks by the NAACP. He noted that had he been aware of the risk of exertional sickle cell death, he would have acted differently. He stated

"All this black and white stuff should be over with by now," he said. "That was my time ... Today's NAACP, the only thing they care about is race. That's not what Dr. Martin Luther King talked about. He talked about a world without race."

== Changes to juvenile justice system ==
When Martin Anderson died, about 130 youths in Florida were incarcerated in state-run boot camps. Before Anderson's death, the state had received more than 180 complaints about excessive force at the Panama City boot camp.

In mid-February, Bay County Sheriff Frank McKeithen ended his office's contract with the state to operate the Panama City boot camp where Anderson was beaten. In a letter to Department of Juvenile Justice (DJJ) head Anthony J. Schembri, McKeithen wrote, "I believe the integrity of the boot camp in Bay County has been compromised, leaving the effectiveness of this program virtually paralyzed."

McKeithen also immediately banned the use of ammonia-inhalant capsules at the Panama City boot camp. McKeithen's announcement came about three weeks before Anderson's body was exhumed for his second autopsy, in which one pathologist concluded that the teen died from ammonia fumes.

At around the same time, DJJ ordered state sheriffs to do away with violent measures such as punching and kicking at the state's boot camps, and directed nurses to call 9-1-1 at the first sign of a problem.

In late April, the Florida Legislature voted to close the state's five juvenile boot camps. The camps were replaced by a less-militaristic program called STAR, which prohibited physical intervention against juvenile inmates. The STAR program had been almost 80 percent effective in test runs around the state at preventing recidivism among inmates.

The bill that enacted the STAR program was renamed the "Martin Lee Anderson Act" by the legislature. Governor Jeb Bush signed it into law on June 1, 2006.

There was no funding made available for the increased costs of the STAR program, forcing many juvenile detention facilities to close their doors.

== See also ==
- List of killings by law enforcement officers in the United States
