= Lifegate Christian School (Eugene, Oregon) =

Location
- 21211 Coburg Rd. Harrisburg, Linn County, Oregon 97446; United States
- Coordinates: 44.0723°N 123.1489°W

Information
- Type: private
- Principal: Charlie Cline
- Grades: Pre K-12
- Enrollment: 60
- Colors: Purple and gold
- Athletics conference: OSAA Mountain West League 1A-3
- Mascot: Lions
- Accreditation: ACSI, NAAS
- Affiliation: Christian
- Website: lifegatechristian.org

Lifegate Christian School is a private Christian high school in Eugene, Oregon, United States.

The school has been accredited by the Association of Christian Schools International since 1994, and by the Northwest Association of Accredited Schools since 1996.
