= Old West Academy =

Private therapeutic boarding school in Rich County, Utah, United

Coordinates: 41°47′18″N 111°6′15″W

Location
- 6450 Manhead Rd; Randolph, Utah; Rich County, Utah 84064

Information
- Former name: Majestic Ranch Academy
- School type: Private
- Founder: 1986
- Closed: 2019
- Director: Tammy Johnson
- Age range: 7 - 14
- Affiliation: World Wide Association of Specialty Programs

Old West Academy, formerly Majestic Ranch Academy, was a Boarding school located in Randolph, Utah. Founded in 1986, it housed boys and girls with behavioral issues, ages 7 to 14.

As of May 2018, marketing for the school was conducted by the Teen Paths subsidiary of the controversial World Wide Association of Specialty Programs and Schools.

== Controversy ==
Like other schools marketed by Teen Paths and associated the World Wide Association of Specialty Programs and Schools, there have been numerous allegations of physical and sexual abuse at Old West Academy. In 2002, academy director Wayne Winder was arrested and charged with aggravated sexual abuse, child abuse, and dealing in material harmful to a minor after he allegedly sexually abused students and showed them pornography. A staff member was fired after reporting child abuse at the school to police. Students at the school had limited contact with their parents and the outside world, and all telephone calls were monitored by staff, making it difficult to report abuse.

There was very little regulatory oversight of the school, and staff apparently received minimal training to prepare them to handle children with behavioral problems. Even after Wayne Winder's arrest on child sexual abuse charges, he continued working at the school as the director.

In 2005, the mother of a male student at the academy filed a lawsuit against the school, claiming that her son was seriously injured after Sean E. Coombs slammed him against a wall and a table, threw him, and struck him. The lawsuit also alleged that the boy was repeatedly restrained and placed in handcuffs during his time at the school.

Reported punishements included students being forced to stand barefoot on milk crates for long hours, outdoors, in sub-freezing temperatures.
