= Ralph Atkin =

American businessman

- Born: Jeffrey Ralph Atkin; 1943 (age 82–83)
- Education: Golden Gate University, University of Utah
- Occupation: Businessman
- Known for: Founder of SkyWest Airlines

Ralph Atkin (born Jeffery Ralph Atkin in 1943) is the founder of SkyWest Airlines in the United States.

== Biography ==
Atkins founded SkyWest Airlines in 1972 and served first as CEO, then as Chairman of the Board for 20 years

A lifelong resident of St. George, Utah, Atkin served a mission for the Church of Jesus Christ of Latter-day Saints in England in his late teens and early 20s. He has undergraduate degrees from Dixie State College and Brigham Young University, an MBA from Golden Gate University and a doctorate of jurisprudence from the University of Utah.

In 1970 he was elected Washington County Attorney, a position he served in one term. From 1991 to 1993 he was director of economic development for the state of Utah.

Atkin has also been associated with the attempted takeover of Trans World Airlines (TWA) in 2001 and with the startup of Ghana International Airlines in Ghana in 2004.

Atkin is a member of the Utah State Bar and has a private law practice in St. George.

He and his wife, Cheri Bennet Atkin, have eight children and 25 grandchildren. Professional skateboarder James R. Atkin is one of his sons.

Atkin is a member of the LDS Church. Among other positions in the church, he has served as a regional director of public affairs. He and his wife have also served as representatives for the church in Turkey.

In a 2024 Netflix Documentary "The Program: Cons, Cults, and Kidnapping," Atkins was accused of being closely associated with the World Wide Association of Specialty Programs and Schools (WWASP) which sponsors residential behavior modification programs for troubled teens. Rampant abuse and fraud allegations have been made against WWASP based programs which supposedly subjected students to physical and mental abuse.
