= Ghana International Airlines =

National airline of Ghana (2005–2010)

IATA	ICAO	Call sign
G0	GHB	GHANA AIRLINES
- Founded: 2004
- Commenced operations: 29 October 2005
- Ceased operations: 13 May 2010
- Hubs: Accra International Airport
- Fleet size: 1
- Destinations: 4
- Headquarters: Accra, Ghana
- Key people: Gifty E. Annan-Myers, G.A.M. Azu, Sean Mendis
- Website: www.fly-ghana.com (archived)

Ghana International Airlines (GIA) was the national airline of the Republic of Ghana between 2005 and 2010. The airline suspended operations on 13 May 2010.

GIA operated scheduled and charter passenger and cargo services. Its main base was Accra International Airport, Accra.

== History ==
The airline was set up in 2004 as a partnership between the government of Ghana and a group of private international investors. A team of executives led by Ralph Atkin, founder of SkyWest Airlines in the United States, was installed, which also included Brian Presbury, the former CEO of Kenya Airways.

Ghana International Airlines commenced operations on 29 October 2005 with daily flights between Accra and London Gatwick Airport using a Boeing 757 wet leased from Ryan International Airlines. The airline commenced seasonal service to OR Tambo International Airport in Johannesburg, South Africa, in 2006. Flights to Düsseldorf, Germany, began in 2008.

It is owned by the Ghanaian government (70%) and US consortium (GIA-USA) (30%), but the shareholders have been engaged in a protracted legal dispute since 2006. The airline had 168 employees (at March 2008).

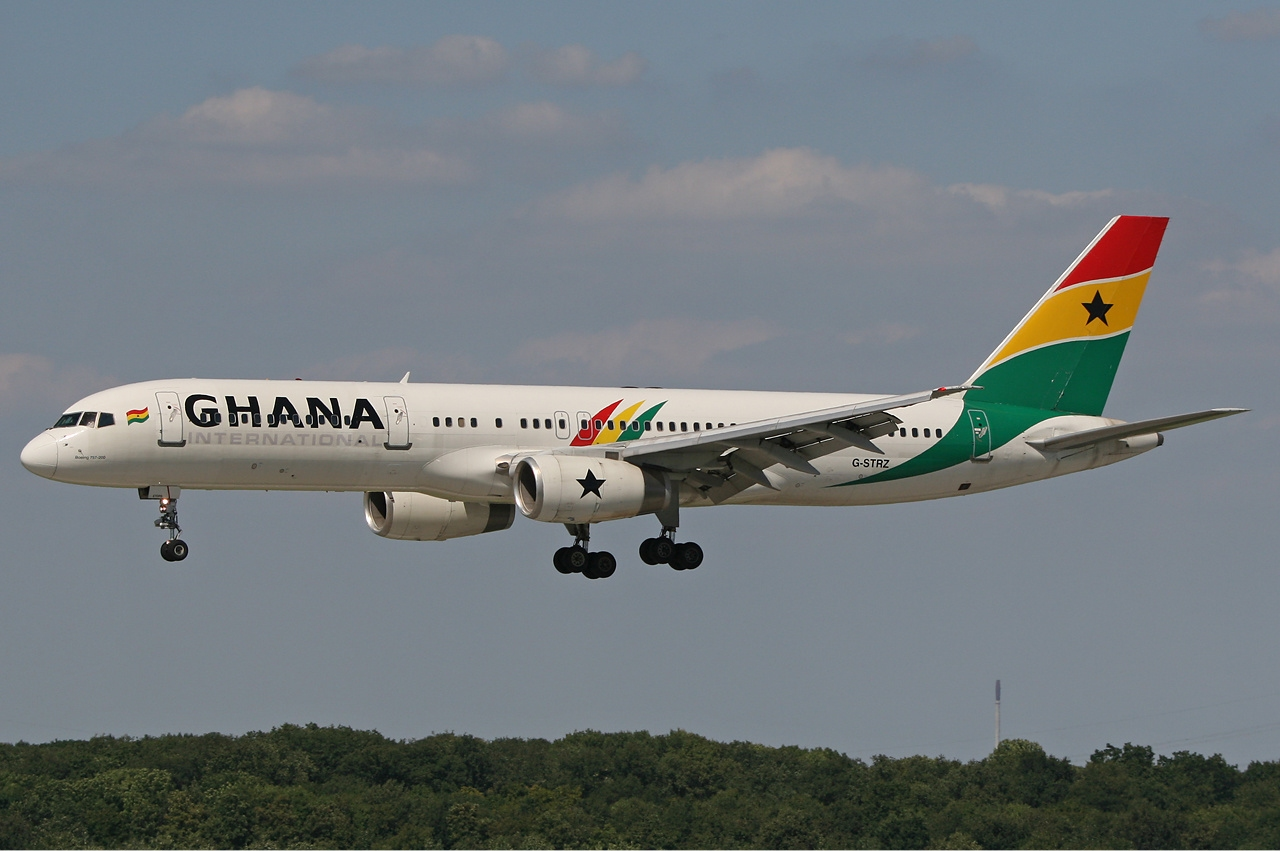
Boeing 757 at Düsseldorf Airport

== Destinations ==
Ghana International served the following destinations:

Germany

- Düsseldorf (Düsseldorf Airport)

Ghana

- Accra (Accra International Airport)

South Africa

- Johannesburg (OR Tambo International Airport)

United Kingdom

- London (London Gatwick Airport)

== Partnership agreements ==
Ghana International Airlines had interline partnerships with numerous international airlines including: Air Baltic, Air Namibia, Continental Airlines, Flybe, Kenya Airways, Air Nigeria and South African Airways.

== Fleet ==
At the time that the airline suspended operations the fleet included (as of 13 May 2010):

Ghana International Airlines fleet
Aircraft	Total	Passengers (Business/Economy)	Routes	Notes
Boeing 757-200	1	169 (16/153)	all	Leased from Astraeus

== Accidents and incidents ==
- On 28 January 2009, a Ghana International Airlines Boeing 757 flying from Accra, Ghana, to London Gatwick, United Kingdom, with 96 passengers and nine crew reported anomalies with the control systems when climbing out of Accra. The aircraft made a safe return to Accra International Airport where the remains of a beetle-like creature were discovered to be obstructing the left pitot system.
