= Casa by the Sea =

Boarding school in Baja California, Mexico

Location
- Ensenada, Baja California, Mexico; 31°52′38″N 116°40′52″W

Information
- School type: Specialty boarding school
- Motto: "A Foundation for Success"
- Established: 1998
- Closed: 2004
- Principal: Dace Goulding
- Affiliation: World Wide Association of Specialty Programs

Casa by the Sea was a private specialty boarding school in Ensenada, Baja California, Mexico. It was operated by the World Wide Association of Specialty Programs and Schools (WWASPS) and primarily enrolled teenagers from the United States who had behavioral issues.

== History ==
In 2004, due to reports of physical abuse and solitary confinement of the children there, Mexican police raided the facility. It was subsequently closed by Mexican government child-protective authorities on September 10, 2004.The U.S. Consulate General's office in Tijuana reported that the concerns that led to the closure included lack of evidence that school employees possessed necessary diplomas or professional licenses, presence at the facility of expired medications for students, and unauthorized use of a pharmacy. At the time of the closure there were 538 students enrolled. After the closure, U.S. Congressman George Miller said this was "the ninth closing of a facility owned or managed by the World Wide Association of Specialty Programs," and urged the U.S. State Department to take action regarding the abuse of American children at WWASPS facilities outside the country.

== Notable alumni ==
- Convicted murderer Michael James Perry, who was executed in Texas in 2010, had been enrolled in Casa by the Sea, but left in 2000 before completing the program.
- Right-wing political commentator Richard Hanania, who enrolled in Casa by the Sea when he was 15, claimed it "changed the course of [his] life for the better".
