= Victory Forge Military Academy =

Coordinates: 27.3138°N 80.3727°W

Victory Forge Military Academy has changed its name to Southeastern Military Academy.

Victory Forge Military Academy, located in Port St. Lucie, Florida, is a year-round boarding school that utilizes military-style components for behavior modification. It enrolls "rebellious and troubled" adolescent males under the age of 18. The academy states that it is accredited by the National Association of Christian Education (NACE). The academy is highly controversial and has been subject to numerous allegations of physical and emotional abuse for its use of shackles and beatings.

== History ==
The facility was formerly a children's home founded in May 1985 by Reverend William Brink, who also operated Brinkhaven Homes for Youth in Ohio, where he was convicted for sexually molesting female students. Brink's two sons, Dale and Mark, a daughter, Molly, and her husband, Alan Weierman, were named as corporate officers. In 1992, Alan Weierman changed the name from Victory Children's Home to Treasure Coast Victory Children's Home and filed papers to have the home incorporated in Florida. In 1993, St. Lucie County commissioners voted to evict the residents of the facility from county property because Weierman refused to seek a state license to operate the shelter for neglected children.

In November 2009, Weierman registered a new nonprofit organization called Southeastern Military Academy, Inc., at the Victory Forge address. As of January 2010, the "Southeastern Military Academy" name was being used on promotional materials for the program operating at the Victory Forge location.

== Alan Weierman ==
The president or commanding officer of Victory Forge, often referred to as "the Colonel", is Alan Weierman. He lists his qualifications as including a Ph.D. in specialized business, a master's degree in counseling and psychology, certification as a behavioral analyst, and (as of 2008) 29 years of experience in child care and youth services.

In 1986, while working at his father-in-law's Brinkhaven Home in Ohio, Weierman was accused by a 16-year-old female resident at the facility of having had sex with her 30 times between August 1985 and June 1986. The police chief of Lawrence Township stated that "his investigation found sufficient probable cause to prosecute Weierman, including a polygraph test given the girl and a calendar she kept of the alleged sexual encounters".

In 1989, Weierman was charged with obstructing justice for not reporting an allegation of child molestation that two girls made against a former director of the school. The charges were later dropped due to a lack of evidence beyond a reasonable doubt.

Weierman was arrested on August 10, 2017 and booked into the Osceola County Jail on 12 counts of Conspiracy to Utter a Forged Instrument, 20 counts of Criminal Use of Personal Identification, 4 counts of Grand Theft from Victims 65 years or older, 74 counts of Use of Public Records to Further the Commission of a Felony and Racketeering. In March, 2019 he was found guilty and sentenced to 10 years probation by an Osceola County judge.

== Child abuse allegations ==
The school's disciplinary practices, including the use of physical restraints, have resulted in allegations of child abuse. Weierman has acknowledged that the school uses shackles as a disciplinary measure, saying that the school instructs boys that they will be shackled if they try to run away.

Between 1994 and 2008, the Florida Department of Children and Families (DCF) investigated 35 child abuse allegations regarding Victory Forge.

In 2000, the DCF was on the verge of revoking Victory Forge's state license, but the home surrendered its license without a fight the day a judge was to hear evidence against the facility. The cause of this violation was that officials from the facility left a 17-year-old boy at another shelter without advanced notification or arrangements. In addition, the officials allowed a child with a history of sexual offenses to share a bedroom with another boy.

In 2002, police reported that students at the academy alleged that "they had been struck with metal pipes and a wooden paddle as methods of punishment".

At the conclusion of an investigation in April 2008, the DCF stated that the agency had "serious concerns about the safety and welfare of children," but there were no criminal violations. The DCF summary report stated that Victory Forge staff were believed to have "engaged in physical discipline that is harmful to children, such as choking to unconsciousness, punching, kicking, banging heads into walls and cabinets." DCF officials found evidence that a boy had been choked and subjected to bizarre punishment and mental injury, and that other boys had been threatened with harm. It had been reported in local media that there had been children found bound in shackles at the facility. DCF also noted that staff at the academy had a "pattern" of leaving the facility during an investigation. DCF officials used a private investigator to find one staff member, who then told DCF officials he had left because of the DCF investigation. He also told DCF that he felt abuse was occurring. In June 2008, police and state prosecutors concluded that Victory Forge had violated the Florida Department of Juvenile Justice policies on use of shackles and other physical restraints, but no criminal violations had occurred.
