= Utah Department of Health and Human Services =

The Utah Department of Health is the Government of Utah's body responsible for public health.

It is headquartered in the Cannon Health Building in Salt Lake City.

== Services ==
In July 2014 the Utah Department of Health issued its first permits for hash oil.

In 2012 a major data breach allowed hackers to access the health data of 700,000 people in the Department of Health records.

Utah Department of Health enables consumer access to personal and family immunization records on-file with Utah State Immunization Information System (USIIS) through the Docket app.

The Utah Department of Health and Human Services is responsible for licensing congregate care facilities, including therapeutic boarding schools and residential treatment centers.
