= Teen escort company =

Company transporting minors to facilities

In the United States, a teen escort company, also called a youth transport firm or secure transport company, is a business that specializes in transporting teenagers from their homes to various facilities in the troubled teen industry. Such businesses typically employ a form of legal kidnapping, abducting sleeping teenagers and forcing them into a vehicle. Teen escort companies in the United States are subject to little or no government regulation and may result in long-term trauma.

In the United States, parents often give teen transport companies temporary control over their children while they are being transported. This is usually done through a contract or legal document called a power of attorney. However, this practice has raised legal concerns about whether parents can give private companies this kind of authority. These concerns are especially serious when workers use physical force or restraints. Legal experts have also warned that the industry has few regulations and that some of its practices may violate laws against child abuse, kidnapping, or illegally holding someone against their will.

== Methodology ==
Teen escort companies regularly employ the practice of "gooning", a form of legal kidnapping occurring predominantly in the United States, in which parents hire rehabilitation organizations to seize children they perceive as troubled and transport them to boot camps, behavior modification facilities, residential treatment centers, substance abuse treatment facilities, wilderness therapy, or therapeutic boarding school. In most cases, the organizations send a group of people to show up by surprise and force the teenager into a vehicle. Parents usually sign an agreement with the transport company before the trip. This gives the company temporary control over their child, sometimes through a legal document called a power of attorney. The company then takes the teenager to a residential or behavioral treatment center. However, legal experts question whether this agreement gives transport workers the legal right to use force or restraints if the teenager refuses to go.

Children to be transported are often picked up during the middle of the night to take advantage of their initial disorientation and to minimize confrontation and flight risk. Aggressive tactics, such as being assaulted, restrained with handcuffs, or hogtied with cable wires, are common. Children are sometimes picked up at school, with the school staff unaware of the escort company's employees' true intentions.

Children who resist are frequently threatened, restrained with handcuffs or zip ties, blindfolded, or hooded. Children who have been gooned frequently report post-traumatic stress disorder, problems sleeping at night, and recurring nightmares into adulthood. Paris Hilton's documentary This Is Paris details her experience at age 17 with gooning, culminating in her transport to Provo Canyon School where she was abused.

== United States ==
As a transport option, parents in the United States are able to hire teen escort companies to transport their children from their homes to residential treatment centers (RTCs) and other facilities in the troubled teen industry. These facilities go by many names, and include private religious re-education facilities, teen residential programs, wilderness therapy programs, therapeutic boarding schools, boot camps, or behavior modification programs.

In 2004, it was estimated that there were more than twenty teen escort companies operating in the United States. Parents may use this type of service when they believe their child needs treatment outside the home, but are unable or unwilling to travel there. The service can cost $5,000 to $8,000 U.S. dollars (up to $10,700 in 2025). Many teen escort companies do not have any training or background requirements for prospective employees.

The use of such services is controversial, because the services are subject to little or no government regulation and because they are associated with treatment services which are themselves controversial. For teenagers seized in the middle of the night by strangers, being abducted by a teen escort company may result in permanent trauma.

The industry has been criticized because there are few rules controlling how companies transport teenagers. In 2022, lawmakers in Utah discussed new rules for these companies after reports that teenagers were taken from their homes by force and sent to residential treatment centers. The Associated Press reported that criminal charges related to these transports were rare and that the industry had very few specific regulations.

== In popular culture ==
=== Films and television ===
- Boot Camp (2008 film), depicting elements associated with teen escort companies, notably when a character is taken from a house party, sedated, and awakens on a remote island near Fiji where a troubled teen program has been established.
- Coldwater (2013 film)
- Self Medicated (2005 film)
- Wayward (2025 miniseries), depicting a teen escort company which takes a character by force, hooding and handcuffing her.
- Idiots (2026 film)

== See also ==
- Therapeutic boarding school
- Provo Canyon School
