= Northwest Accreditation Commission =

University accreditation organization in the United States

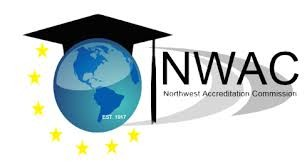
- Abbreviation: NWAC
- Formation: April 5, 1917; 109 years ago
- Type: Non-governmental organization
- Purpose: Educational accreditation
- Headquarters: Boise, Idaho
- Region served: Alaska, Idaho, Montana, Nevada, Oregon, Utah, Washington, India
- Owner: Cognia
- Parent organization: Six Regional Accrediting Agencies in USA
- Website: www.cognia.org, www.seriindia.org//

The Northwest Accreditation Commission (NWAC), formerly named the Northwest Association of Accredited Schools, is a non-governmental organization that provides accreditation to educational institutions in the Northwestern United States. The Commission accredits K–12, elementary, middle, and high schools; those offering distance education; non- degree-granting postsecondary institutions; and special purpose, supplementary education, travel education, and trans-regional schools in seven states in the northwestern United States. Formerly an independent entity based in Boise, Idaho, it is now a division of AdvancED.

The commission operates in seven states: Alaska, Idaho, Montana, Nevada, Oregon, Utah, and Washington. Now it operates in India also in collaboration with SERI India. The Northwest Commission on Colleges and Universities, which also serves this geographic territory, operates as the postsecondary equivalent of the NWAC.

== History ==
The organization traces its history to 1917 when the Northwest Association of Secondary and Higher Schools was formed. In 1974 the association changed its name to the Northwest Association of Schools and Colleges. In 2000 it became the Northwest Association of Schools and Colleges and Universities, which disbanded and split into two separate organizations in 2004, with the Northwest Association of Accredited Schools handling the accreditation of schools and the Northwest Commission on Colleges and Universities handling the accreditation of institutions of higher education.

In 2005 the organization's practice of accrediting schools outside its primary service region attracted controversy after it accredited a school in New York that was found to be issuing high school diplomas without the necessary state authorizations that were supposed to be prerequisites for accreditation. Northwest Association officials explained that it had accredited schools located outside its primary service region because they were operated by an organization based in the region.

In January 2012 the Northwest Accreditation Commission became a division of AdvancED, which was formed by the North Central Association Commission on Accreditation and School Improvement and the Southern Association of Colleges and Schools Council on Accreditation and School Improvement.

On December 5, 2011, the NWAC Commission and Board of Trustees voted at the annual meeting to approve new bylaws that officially made NWAC a division of AdvancED. Beginning July 1, 2012, all operations of NWAC are under the governance of AdvancED through its Northwest Regional Office. AdvancED has also a regional office in Delhi, India by the name of School for e-Education Research and Innovation (SERI).

== Recognized in India ==
Equivalence Certificate issued by Association of Indian Universities (AIU) for the students having completed their School Level Examinations from Foreign Boards are Accepted in India

In 2014 The Association of Indian Universities (AIU) has Accorded the American High School Diploma of NWAC to Grade 12/12th Class/Senior Secondary/+2 issued by Indian Boards of Education vide their letter No EV/II(21)/2014/ dated 04 April 2014.

In 2016 The Northwest Accreditation Commission (NWAC) High School Diploma is Equivalent to Central Board of Secondary Education (CBSE)12th/Sr. Sec.

In 2019 The Northwest Accreditation Commission (NWAC) is Recognized by COBSE and NWAC Become Officially Associate Members OF Council of Boards of School Education (COBSE)

== Events ==
In 2019 Northwest Accreditation Commission, USA (NWAC) hosted a conference organized by Council of Boards of School Education in India (COBSE) in New Delhi. The theme of the conference was 'De-stressing Examination'
