= Behavior modification facility =

Institution

A behavior modification facility (or youth residential program) is a residential educational and treatment total institution enrolling adolescents who are perceived as displaying antisocial behavior, in an attempt to alter their conduct. The facilities are part of what has been called the Troubled Teen Industry.

Ambiguous labeling practices and irregular and inconsistent licensing rules make it difficult to gauge how many of these facilities exist. Programs in the United States have been controversial due to widespread allegations of abuse and trauma imposed on enrolled adolescents as well as deceptive marketing practices aimed at parents. Critics claim the facilities do not use evidence-based treatments.

== Methodologies used in such programs ==
Practices and service quality in such programs vary greatly. The behavior modification methodologies used vary, but a combination of positive and negative reinforcement is typical. Often these methods are delivered in a contingency management format such as a point system or level system. Such methodology has been found to be highly effective in the treatment of disruptive disorders (see meta-analysis of Chen & Ma (2007).

Positive reinforcement mechanisms include points, rewards and signs of status, while punishment procedures may include time-outs, point deductions, reversal of status, prolonged stays at a facility, physical restraint, or even corporal punishment. Research showed that time-out length was not a factor and suggestions were made to limit time-outs to five-minute durations. A newer approach uses graduated sanctions. Staff appear easily trained in behavioral intervention; such training is maintained and does lead to improved consumer outcomes, as well as reduce turnover. More restrictive punishment procedures in general are less appealing to staff and administrators.

Behavioral programs were found to lessen the need for medication. Several studies have found that gains made in residential treatment programs are maintained from 1–5 years post discharge. Therapeutic boarding schools are boarding schools based on the therapeutic community model that offers an educational program together with specialized structure and supervision for students with emotional and behavioral problems, substance abuse problems, or learning difficulties. Some schools are accredited as residential treatment centers.

Behavioral residential treatment became so popular in the 1970s and 1980s that a journal was formed called Behavioral Residential Treatment, which later changed its name to Behavioral Interventions. The journal continues to be published as of September 2026.

== History ==
In the late 1960s, behavior modification or practice referred to as applied behavior analysis began to move rapidly into residential treatment facilities. The goal was to redesign the behavioral architecture around delinquent teens to lessen chances of recidivism and improve academics. Harold Cohen and James Filipczak (1971) published a book hailing the successes of such programs in doubling learning rates and reducing recidivism. This book even contained an introduction from the leading behaviorist at the time, B.F. Skinner, hailing the achievements. Independent analysis of multiple sites with thousands of adolescents found behavior modification to be more effective than treatment as usual, a therapeutic milieu, and as effective as more psychologically intense programs such as transactional analysis with better outcomes on behavioral measures; however, these authors found that behavior modification was more prone to leading to poor relationships with the clients. Over time, interest faded in Cohen's CASE project. Other studies found that improper supervision of staff in behavior modification facilities could lead to greater use of punishment procedures.

Under the leadership of Montrose Wolf, Achievement Place, the first Teaching Family Home became the prototype for behavioral programs. Achievement place opened in 1967. Each home has from 6-8 boys in it with two "parents" trained in behavior modification principles. The token system for the program was divided into 3 levels. Outcome studies have found that Achievement Place and other teaching family homes reduce recidivism and increase pro-social behavior, as well as self-esteem. While initial research suggested the effects of the program only lasted for one year post discharge, recent review of the data suggests the program lasts longer in effect.

Gradually, behavior modification and applied behavior analysis within the penal system including residential facilities for delinquent youth lost popularity in the 1970s-1980s due to a large number of abuses, such as those described by Cautilli & Weinberg in 2007, but recent trends in the increase in U.S. crime and recent focus on reduction of recidivism have given such programs a second look. Indeed, because of societal needs, the number of youth residential facilities has grown over time, up to about 39,950 existing as of 2000. The use of functional analysis has been shown to be both teachable to staff and able to reduce use of punishment procedures. Rutherford's 2009 review from interviews and archival materials documents the decline from treatment of behavior analysis with criminal justice populations.

These facilities are part of what has been described as the troubled teen Industry.

== Controversy ==
The U.S. Surgeon General (1999) discussed the need to clarify admission criteria to residential treatment programs. Included in the same report was the call for more updated research as most of the residential research had been completed in the 1960s and 1970s.

Disability rights organizations, such as the Bazelon Center for Mental Health Law, oppose placement in such programs. They call into question the appropriateness and efficacy of such group placements, the failure of such programs to address problems in the child's home and community environment, the limited or no mental health services offered and substandard educational programs.

In their place, Bazelon promotes community-based services, which it considers more effective and less costly than residential placement. While behavior modification programs can be delivered as easily in residential programs as in community-based programs, overall, community-based programs continue to lack empirical support, especially with respect to long term outcomes for severe cases. In 1999 the surgeon general clearly stated that "...it is premature to endorse the effectiveness of residential treatment for adolescents."

The United States Congress Committee on Education and Labor created the Stop Child Abuse in Residential Programs for Teens Act of 2008 after testimony and support were provided in late 2007 through early 2008 by a broad coalition of grassroots efforts by prominent medical and psychological organizations. This included members of the Alliance for the Safe, Therapeutic and Appropriate use of Residential Treatment (ASTART) and the Community Alliance for the Ethical Treatment of Youth (CAFETY).

Jon Martin-Crawford and Kathryn Whitehead of CAFETY testified at a hearing of the United States Congress Committee on Education and Labor on April 24, 2008, where they described abusive practices they had experienced at the Family Foundation School and Mission Mountain School, both therapeutic boarding schools.

One recent acknowledgement has been that long-term care does not equate with better outcomes.

To reduce the tendency for abuse, a strong push has occurred to certify or license behavior modifiers or to have such practices limited to licensed psychologists. In particular psychologists with behavioral training The American Psychological Association offers a diplomate (a post-Ph.D. licensed certification) in behavioral psychology.

Often the practice of behavior modification in facilities comes into question (see recent interest in Judge Rotenberg Educational Center, Aspen Education Group and the World Wide Association of Specialty Programs and Schools). Often these types of restrictive issues are discussed as part of ethical and legal standards (see Professional practice of behavior analysis). Recent research has identified some best practices for use in such facilities. In general policies in such facilities require the presence of a treatment team to ensure that abuses do not occur, especially if facilities are attempting to use punishment programs.

== Regulations ==
In the U.S. residential treatment programs are all monitored at the state level and many are JACHO accredited. States vary in requirements to open such centers. Due to the absence of regulation of these programs by the federal government and because many are not subject to state licensing or monitoring, the Federal Trade Commission has issued a guide for parents considering such placement. Due to irregular licensing practices and differences in the kinds of labels that facilities themselves use, it is unclear how many facilities exist in the United States.

== See also ==
- Teen escort company
- Therapeutic boarding school
- Teaching-Family Model
- Residential treatment center
- Troubled teen industry
