= World Wide Association of Specialty Programs and Schools =

Organization associated with the troubled teen industry

- Formation: 1998; 28 years ago
- Founder: Robert Lichfield
- Founded at: La Verkin, Utah, US
- Key people: Ken Kay President
- Website: http://www.wwasp.com

The World Wide Association of Specialty Programs and Schools (WWASPS or WWASP) was a Utah-based organization that operated a network of behavior modification programs and boarding schools for teenagers. Founded in 1998 by Robert Lichfield, the organization was associated with the troubled teen industry and operated facilities in the United States and several other countries.

== History ==
=== Expansion ===
In 2005, Robert Lichfield and the Utah-based holding company, Golden Pond Investments Ltd., made an offer to buy the campus of the Kemper Military School in Boonville, Missouri, to open a new school for adolescents needing help with discipline, responsibility and leadership skills. It was announced that the school would be directed by former WWASPS staff member Randall Hinton and his brother Russell Hinton. The Hintons told Boonville officials that the proposed school would not be a part of WWASPS. The Boonville City Council rejected the proposal.

=== Decline and closure ===
In July 2007, World Wide's president, Ken Kay, told the Salt Lake Tribune that only two schools remained in the WWASPS network, and that one, Majestic Ranch Academy in Utah, was likely to sever its ties with the organization. In a December 2010 newspaper article, Kay was reported to have said that the organization was no longer in business, but because of ongoing litigation, it had not been dissolved.

== Related and spinoff programs and projects ==
Some former WWASPS personnel have gone on to establish or work at other similar institutions:

Ken Kay was superintendent of Browning Distance Learning Academy, a provider of homeschooling curriculum. Its materials were used by Mentor School in Costa Rica. As of 2022 no other school or homeschooling group has used Browning Distance Learning Academy, and it is assumed the company went bankrupt after Mentor's closure. Browning Distance Learning Academy does not seem to be up and running at this time.

== Controversy ==
WWASPS and its associated institutions have been the target of criticism over their treatment methods, including allegations of severe abuse and torture by staff at programs supported by WWASPS. The programs have been the subject of legal investigations by several U.S. states. In 2003, a reporter for The New York Times interviewed 60 current and former program participants and parents; some gave positive reports of their experiences, while other participants and parents said that WWASPS programs were abusive.

Numerous former students or their parents have filed lawsuits against WWASPS, its personnel, or individual schools. Most have been settled out of court or dismissed for procedural reasons. For example, a 2005 lawsuit filed in California on behalf of more than 20 plaintiffs was dismissed because the judge found that California lacked jurisdiction. In June 2007, Utah attorney Thomas M. Burton told a reporter that six suits he had filed against WWASPS on behalf of his clients had been dismissed on procedural grounds. WWASPS president Ken Kay told an interviewer that lawsuits against WWASPS are ploys to get money, brought by people who "are never going to be happy." A lawsuit filed in 2007 against WWASPS and its founder, Robert Lichfield, on behalf of 133 plaintiffs alleging physical and sexual abuse and fraudulent conceallment of abuse brought negative publicity to Republican Presidential candidate Mitt Romney, because Lichfield was one of six co-chairs of the Utah state fundraising committee for Romney's campaign.

On several occasions, WWASPS and its principals have responded to criticism by suing their critics. Robert Lichfield sued two individuals associated with the International Survivors Action Committee (ISAC) for defamation, invasion of his privacy, and causing "intentional interference with 'prospective economic advantage'." In May 2005 a U.S. Circuit Court of Appeals dismissed (on jurisdictional grounds) a defamation lawsuit brought by WWASPS against a United Press International reporter who had done research for a news story about alleged abuse at several WWASPS schools. The reporter was accused of having made defamatory statements about WWASPS to "potential students, former students, parents of potential and former students, an employee of a state agency responsible for licensing a member school, and a Utah attorney who had filed numerous suits against [WWASPS]."

== Legal ==
On August 31, 2007, Randall Hinton was convicted of one count each of third degree assault and false imprisonment, for mistreating students at the WWASPS-affiliated Royal Gorge Academy, of which he was manager and co-founder. However, the jury returned a verdict of not guilty for four other counts of third-degree assault and one other count of false imprisonment. Hinton was sentenced to 25 days in jail followed by one year on probation.

== See also ==
- Help at Any Cost: How the Troubled-Teen Industry Cons Parents and Hurts Kids
- The Program: Cons, Cults, and Kidnapping
