= Redcliffe =

Redcliffe may refer to:

== Places ==
=== Australia ===
- Redcliffe Peninsula, a peninsula and suburban region in the Brisbane metropolitan area, Queensland
  - Redcliffe, Queensland, the central suburb of Redcliffe City
  - City of Redcliffe, the former Local Government covering Redcliffe
  - Electoral district of Redcliffe
- Redcliffe, Western Australia

=== Elsewhere ===
- Redcliffe, a town near Verulam, KwaZulu-Natal, South Africa
- Redcliffe, Bristol, UK
- Redcliffe Plantation State Historic Site, listed on the NRHP in South Carolina, US
- Redcliffe (ward), electoral ward in London, England

== People ==
- John Redcliffe-Maud (1906–1982), British civil servant and diplomat to South Africa, husband of Jean Redcliffe-Maud
- Jean Redcliffe-Maud (1904–1993), British pianist and author, wife of John Redcliffe-Maud
- Stratford Canning, 1st Viscount Stratford de Redcliffe (1786–1880), British diplomat, ambassador to the Ottoman Porte
- Redcliffe Salaman (1874–1955), British botanist

== Other ==
- Redcliffe (stage musical), 2026 stage musical by Jordan Luke Gage.

== See also ==
- Redcliffe Airport (disambiguation)
- Redcliffe Bridge (disambiguation)
- Redcliffe Hall (disambiguation)
- Red Cliff (disambiguation)
- Redcliff (disambiguation)
- Radcliffe (disambiguation)
- Ratcliffe (disambiguation)
- 赤壁 (disambiguation)
