= Ratliff =

Ratliff is a surname of British origin, which is a habitational name for a person from any of the places in Britain called Ratcliffe, Radcliffe, or Redcliff, which in turn are variants on the phrase "red cliff". The surname may also be spelled Ratcliff, Radcliff, Ratcliffe, or Radcliffe. Ratliff may refer to:

- Alfonso Ratliff (born 1956), American boxer
- Anthony Ratliff-Williams (born 1997), American football player
- Arthur M. Ratliff (1924–2007), American teacher, author, and businessman
- Ben Ratliff (born 1968), American journalist, music critic, and author
- Bennett Ratliff (born 1961), American politician
- Bill Ratliff (1936–2025), American politician
- Bo Ratliff (1933–2024), American singer
- Brett Ratliff (born 1985), American football player
- Carlos Ratliff (1910–1961), American football, basketball, and baseball player and coach
- Connor Ratliff, American actor and comedian
- David Ratliff (1912–1995), American politician
- Don Ratliff (born 1950), American football player
- Elizabeth Ratliff (1942–1985), American murder victim
- Ellington Ratliff (born 1993), American musician
- Evan Ratliff (born 1976), American journalist
- Gene Ratliff (born 1945), American baseball player
- James Ratliff, American politician
- Jeremiah Ratliff (born 1981), American football player
- Jon Ratliff (born 1971), American baseball player
- Landon Ratliff (born 2006), American Lacrosse player
- Keith Ratliff (1980–2013), American murder victim
- Keiwan Ratliff (born 1981), American football player
- Marie Ratliff (born? ), American music columnist
- Marshall Ratliff (died 1927), American criminal
- Martha Ratliff (born 1946), American linguist
- Melissa Ratcliff (born 1976), American politician
- Meshack Ratliff (1832–1922), American cavalry officer and politician
- Mike Ratliff (born 1951), American basketball player
- Mishon Ratliff (born 1993), American actor
- Neil Ratliff (1936–1994), American music librarian
- Paul Ratliff (born 1944), American baseball player
- Perry M. Ratliff (born 1947), American admiral
- Scott Ratliff (born 1943), American politician
- Theo Ratliff (born 1973), American basketball player
- Thomas Ratliff (1836–?), English cricketer
- Walter Ratliff (born 1971), American journalist
- Wayne Ratliff (born 1946), American computer scientist
- William Ratliff (1937–2014), American political scientist

== In fiction ==
- V. K. Ratliff, a character and sometimes narrator in William Faulkner's novels, The Hamlet, The Town, and The Mansion. He also makes appearances in some other Faulkner novels and stories.

== See also ==
- Ed Ratleff (born 1950), American basketball player
- Ratliff Boon (1781–1844), American politician
- Ratliff City, Oklahoma
- Ratliff Stadium, Texas
- Mount Ratliff, Antarctica
