= 赤壁 =

赤壁 may refer to:

- Chibi, Hubei Province, a city in China
- Chiburi Sekiheki (知夫赤壁), place of Scenic Beauty in Shimane, Japan
- Red Cliff (film), 2008–2009 epic war film
- Red Cliff (Peking opera) by the China NCPA
- Red Cliffs (赤壁), fictional place in the manga Ikki Tousen

== See also ==
- Chibi (disambiguation)
- Redcliff (disambiguation)
- Redcliffe (disambiguation)
