= Ratcliffe (surname) =

Ratfcliffe is a surname, and may refer to:

- Arthur Ratcliffe (1882–1963), British Conservative Member of Parliament for Leek 1931–1935
- Betty Ratcliffe (c.1735 – c.1810), British artist
- David Ratcliffe (born 1957), English-born footballer
- David Ratcliffe (cricketer) (1939–2021), English cricketer
- Derek Ratcliffe (1929–2005), British ecologist
- Don Ratcliffe (1934–2014), English footballer
- Francis Ratcliffe (1904–1970), Australian zoologist
- Henry Butler Ratcliffe (1845–1929), British Conservative Member of Parliament for Bradford Central 1918–1922
- J. A. Ratcliffe (1902–1987), British ionospheric physicist and academic
- Jack Ratcliffe (footballer) (1880–1948), English footballer
- Jim Ratcliffe (born 1952), British billionaire, chemical engineer and financier
- Jo Ratcliffe, British artist
- John Ratcliffe (governor) (1549–1609), governor of the original Jamestown, Virginia, US
- John Ratcliffe (American politician) (born 1965), director of the Central Intelligence Agency, a former Director of National Intelligence, and a former US Congressman from Texas
- Jordan Ratcliffe, English teenager who went missing in 2008
- Kevin Ratcliffe (born 1960), Welsh footballer
- Marcus Ratcliffe (born 2005), American football player
- Mildred Ratcliffe (1899–1988), English painter, commercial artist and calligrapher
- Paddy Ratcliffe (1919–1986), Irish footballer
- Peter J. Ratcliffe (born 1954), physician-scientist
- Richard Ratcliffe, husband of the Iranian-British detainee Nazanin Zaghari-Ratcliffe
- Richard Ratcliffe (died 1485), English nobleman
- Richard Ratcliffe (1751–1825), American public official considered to be the founder of the city of Fairfax, Virginia, in 1805
- Simon Ratcliffe, of house music duo Basement Jaxx

== See also ==
- Radcliffe (surname)
- Ratcliff (surname)
