= Chibi =

Chibi most often refers to:

- Chibi (style), a super-deformed diminutive style of Japanese-influenced art, typically with big heads and small bodies
- Chibi, Hubei (赤壁 lit. Red Cliff), a county-level city in southeastern Hubei, China

Chibi may also refer to:

== Media ==
- Chibi (Urusei Yatsura), a fictional character in the 1978 Urusei Yatsura manga series
- Chibi-usa or Little Bunny, a fictional character first appearing in 1993 in the Sailor Moon manga series

== Music ==
- Chibi, the lead singer of the 1999 band The Birthday Massacre
- ChiBi, or Cherrybelle, a 2011 Indonesian girl group
- Hoàng Yến Chibi, a Vietnamese female singer

== Naval ==
- Battle of Red Cliffs, or Battle of Chibi, a decisive naval battle in the winter of AD 208–9 near the city of Chibi
  - Red Cliff (Peking opera) (Chinese: 赤壁; pinyin: chìbì), 2008 opera dramatizing the battle
  - Red Cliff (film), or Chibi, a 2009 film about the battle

== Places ==
- Chibi Subdistrict, Huangzhou District, Huanggang, Hubei, China
- Chivi District, formerly Chibi, in the Masvingo Province of Zimbabwe
- Chibi (Switzerland), a medieval locality in Aclens, Switzerland

== See also ==
- Chibi Vampire, the English title of a Japanese manga series
- Cheebies, animated characters in Waybuloo
- Red Cliff (disambiguation)
