= Keith Baker =

Keith Baker may refer to:

- Keith Baker (game designer) (born 1969), American game designer
- Keith Baker (gridiron football) (born 1957), American football player active in the Canadian Football League
- Keith Baker (footballer) (1956–2013), English football player
- Keith Baker (musician) (born 1950), American drummer for Uriah Heep
- Keith Michael Baker (born 1938), British historian
- Keith Baker (fl. 1980s–1990s), Australian High Commissioner to Vanuatu from 1988 to 1990

== See also ==
- Keith Bakker (1960–2025), American-Dutch mental health practitioner and convicted criminal
