= John Ratcliffe (disambiguation) =

John Ratcliffe (born 1965) is an American politician.

John Ratcliffe may also refer to:

== Politics ==
- John Ratcliffe (Lancashire MP) (c. 1536–1590), MP for Wigan, 1563, and Lancashire, 1571–1572
- John Ratcliffe (governor) (1549–1609), English sailor and colonial governor of Virginia
- Sir John Ratcliffe (soldier) (1582–1627), English soldier and politician
- John Ratcliffe (Chester MP, died 1633), English brewer, MP for Chester, 1621, 1628–1629
- John Ratcliffe (Chester MP, died 1673) (c. 1611–1673), English barrister, MP for Chester, 1646–1653, son of the above
- Sir John Ratcliffe (mayor), Lord Mayor of Birmingham, 1856–1858

== Others ==
- John Ratcliffe (clergyman) (1700–1775), English clergyman and Master of Pembroke College, Oxford
- John Ratcliffe (book collector) (1707–1776), English book collector
- J. A. Ratcliffe (John Ashworth Ratcliffe, 1902–1987), British radio physicist
- John Henry Ratcliffe, Canadian stockbroker, one of the founders of McLeod Young Weir Co. & Ltd.

== See also ==
- John Radcliffe (disambiguation)
- John Ratcliff (cricketer) (1848–1925), English cricketer
- John Ratcliff, British manager and producer for the band A-ha
