= Meshack =

Meshack is a masculine given name. Notable people with the name include:

- Dumezweni Meshack Mthimkhulu, Motswana politician
- Meshack Abel Mwankina (born 1987), Tanzanian footballer
- Meshack Asare (born 1945), Ghanaian writer
- Meshack Franklin (1722–1839), American politician
- Meshack Kondwani, Zimbabwean boxer
- Meshack Lufile (born 1992), Canadian basketball player
- Meshack Maphangule (born 1991), South African footballer
- Meshack Mavuso (born 1977), South African actor
- Meshack Opulukwa (born 1967), Tanzanian politician
- Meshack Radebe (1948/1949–2021), South African politician
- Meshack Ratliff (1832–1922), American Army officer and politician
- Meshack Roberts, American slave, minister and politician
