= Redcliff =

Redcliff may refer to:

== Canada ==
- Redcliff, Alberta

== England ==
- Redcliff Point, Dorset
- Redcliff, East Riding of Yorkshire, a clay cliff on the Humber Estuary bank, archaeological site

== United States ==
- Redcliff (Colorado), a high mountain summit in Colorado
- Red Cliff, Wisconsin
- RedCliff Ascent, wilderness therapy program in Utah

== Zimbabwe ==
- Redcliff, Zimbabwe
- Redcliff (constituency)

== See also ==
- Red Cliff (disambiguation)
- Redcliffe (disambiguation)
- Redcliffs, a suburb of Christchurch, Canterbury, New Zealand
- Radcliffe (disambiguation)
- Ratcliffe (disambiguation)
- 赤壁 (disambiguation)
