= Rateliff =

Rateliff is a surname. Notable people with the surname include:

- John D. Rateliff, American author of roleplaying games and independent scholar
- Nathaniel Rateliff (born 1978), American singer and songwriter

== See also ==
- Ratliff
