= Radcliffe =

Radcliffe or Radcliff may refer to:

== Places ==
- Radcliffe Line, a border between India and Pakistan

=== United Kingdom ===
- Radcliffe, Greater Manchester
  - Radcliffe Tower, the remains of a medieval manor house in the town
  - Radcliffe tram stop
- Radcliffe, Northumberland
- Radcliffe-on-Trent, Nottinghamshire
  - Radcliffe railway station

=== United States ===
- Radcliffe, Iowa
- Radcliff, Kentucky
- Radcliffe, Lexington
- Radcliff, Ohio

== Schools ==
- Radcliffe College (1879–1999), a former women's college that was associated with Harvard University
- Radcliffe Institute for Advanced Study (1999–present), a postgraduate study institute of Harvard University that succeeded the former Radcliffe College
- The Radcliffe School, a secondary school in Wolverton, Milton Keynes, England

== Other uses ==
- Radcliff (surname)
- Radcliffe (surname), including a list of people with the name
- "Radcliffe", an episode of the Indian TV series Sacred Games
- 1420 Radcliffe, a main-belt asteroid
- Radcliffe baronets, a title in the Baronetage of the United Kingdom
- Radcliffe Camera, a library building at Oxford University
- Radcliffe Cricket Club
- Radcliffe F.C., a football club in Radcliffe, Greater Manchester, England
- John Radcliffe Hospital, a hospital in Oxford
- Radcliffe Infirmary, a former hospital in Oxford
- Radcliffe report, a 1959 report on the Bank of England

== See also ==
- Alfred Radcliffe-Brown (1881–1955), English social anthropologist
- Daniel Radcliffe (born 1989), English actor
- Edward Radclyffe (1809–1863), English engraver
- H. Radclyffe Roberts (1906–1982), American entomologist
- John Radcliffe (disambiguation)
- Mark Radcliffe (disambiguation)
- Paula Radcliffe (born 1973), British long-distance runner
- Radclyffe (born 1950), American author
- Radclyffe Hall (1880–1943), British novelist and poet
- The Radclyffe School, Chadderton, England
- Ratcliffe (disambiguation)
- Redcliff (disambiguation)
- Redcliffe (disambiguation)
