= Brat Camp =

Reality TV show

- Countries of origin: United Kingdom; United States
- No. of seasons: 5 Series in UK
- No. of episodes: 23 in UK series

Production
- Running time: 60 mins. (inc. adverts)
- Production company: Twenty Twenty Television

Original release
- Network: Channel 4 (UK); ABC/BBC K (U.S.)
- Release: 13 July 2005 – 24 August 2007

Brat Camp is a reality television show in which teenagers are sent to wilderness therapy programs. The first season, featuring RedCliff Ascent, won an International Emmy. Subsequent seasons saw declining viewership. The American version of Brat Camp was cancelled after its one-season run, but is being aired in Canada on Slice as of early 2007. The UK version was also aired in the United States in 2004 on ABC Family, and its popularity resulted in ABC ordering an American version. The show was cancelled on 24 August 2007.

== United Kingdom ==
There have been five UK series.

The format is distributed internationally by DRG and has been adapted in several territories.

=== Series 1 ===
In series one of Brat Camp, the teenagers are enrolled at RedCliff Ascent, a wilderness therapy program based in the town of Enterprise, Utah. Upon arrival, the team is blindfolded and then driven out to Escalante Desert they spend weeks hiking up various mountains in this region.

UK Series 1: RedCliff Ascent - Wilderness therapy (four episodes)
Name	From	Published problem
James Fonfé	Marlow	Drug issues
Fran Bradley	Somerset	Anger issue
Rachel Greenberg	Leyton	Alcohol issue
Charlie Mason	Putney	Anger issue
Tom Philips	Kidderminster	Drug issue
Dan Leary	Surrey	Drug issue caused by depression

RedCliff Ascent was asked to be featured in a second round of Brat Camp, but declined when it became obvious that the next season would require tougher kids and increased drama. The first series won an International Emmy Award for best non-scripted program. RedCliff Ascent spokesman, Stephen Schultz, mentioned that "RedCliff Ascent is a treatment program, not a TV show". While most students struggle a bit upon return home, a year later James was working with his mother teaching swimming and had been drug-free, as verified by urine tests administered by his mother. As James put it: "You do feel trapped. But it is worth it. I am glad I did it. I wouldn’t go back now, but I don’t have a problem any more – if I had a problem in the future, then I would go back."

=== Series 2 ===
UK Series 2: Turn-About Ranch - Residential treatment center (5 episodes)
Name	From	Published problem
Alex Parkins	Leicester	Alcohol issue, disrespectful, expelled from school and bullies her mother
Joe Sheldrick	Surrey	Disobedience and disrespectful
Ed McAllister	Banbury	Drug issue and stealing from family.
Jemma Henley	Oxford	Disobedience, shoplifter and expelled from 3 schools
Xanthe Laird	Devon	Cannabis use, alcohol issue and disrespectful
Jenni Greevy	Southampton	Anger issue, disobedience and disrespectful
Josh Melvin	Finchley	Drug issue, disrespectful and drug fuelled anger issues

=== Series 3 ===
UK Series 3: Aspen Achievement Academy - Wilderness therapy (5 episodes)
Name	Age	From	Published problem
Julia Krzyzanowska	16	Dorset	Drug issues
Georgie Turnbull-Atkinson	16	Crawley	Drug issues as well as run-ins with the law
Lydia Rowlands	16	Southampton	Drug issue as a result of being victim of bullying
Lucy Tyson	15	Lancaster	Anger issue, disrespectful and greedy
Danni Calardo-Thompson	15	Leicester	Running away from home, alcohol and drug-issue
Rosie Raven	15	East London	Truancy from school depressed as a result of being victim of bullying

The third series followed a girls-only group with the principal activity being a single-extended hike. This series aired from 8 February 2006 on Channel 4. In addition, Brat Camp Unseen, a half-hour show with additional footage, was aired on E4.

=== Series 4 ===
The fourth series that followed a girls-only group, Family Brat Camp, aired from 4 October 2006, and brings along the parents of the four children to make them take responsibility for their kids' behaviour at the SUWS wilderness program in Idaho.

UK Series 4: Aspen Family Camp, Idaho - Wilderness therapy (4 episodes)
Name	From	Published problem
Benjamin Tait, parents Jennifer and Matthew	Oxford	Drug issues, Expelled from school
Claire Sparrow, parents Dean and Sandy	Essex	Expelled/suspended from 1 school
Amanda Kenny, parents Sandra and Bill	Croydon	Drinking, stealing from parents
Rebecca Paramor, parents Mandi and Mark	Hebden Bridge	Drug issue

Benjamin died of a drug overdose in 2009.

=== Series 5 ===
The fifth UK version aired October 2007. According to a statement on ANASAZI's homepage, A special 21-day version of their normal 42-day program is being developed for television, after which Twenty Twenty Television will fund the remainder of the treatment if the parents and clinical staff consider it necessary.

UK Series 5: ANASAZI Foundation, Arizona - Wilderness therapy(4 episodes)
Name	Published problem
Natasha Whitlock, mother Montana	domestic problems caused by overindulgence
Nicole Pear, mother Jackie	foul-mouthing, anger management
Chloe Weeks, mother Helen	drug and anger-issue
Laura Wardman, mother Del	disobedience

== United States ==
US Series: SageWalk, Oregon - Wilderness therapy
Name	Age	From	Published problem
Frank Hewitt	16	Sacramento, California	Anger issue
Lauren James	17	California	Drug issue as a result of death in the family
Isaiah Alarcon	17	California	Anger issue
Jada Chabot	15	Boston, Massachusetts	Disobedience and dishonesty as a result of domestic violence.
Nick Thompson	14	Seattle, Washington	Anger issue as a result of being bullied because of his learning disability (dyslexia). He attempted to stab his brother due to his jealousy.
Shawn Dreyfuss	17	California	Started using cannabis after finding out that he was adopted. He then started stealing money from his mother.
Derek Ross	14	Arkansas	ADHD and destructive; refuses to take medication
Lexie McNulty	17	California	Depressed, hostile outcast as a result of being victim of molestation at the age of 12.
Heather Norton	17	Virginia	Drug issue as a result of adoption and wanting to be closer to her birth mother. Her birth mother had drug issues too.

== Germany ==
- The German version is called Teenager außer Kontrolle (engl. Teenagers out of control) . The show is being broadcast on RTL

=== Series 1 ===
German Series 1: Turnabout Ranch - Residential treatment center
Name	Published problem
Vanessa Schumacher	Alcohol issue, too much partying
Simon Seidel	Drug issue, stealing from parent
Marvin Kraus	Gang problem, alcohol issue
Gina Ziegler	Alcohol issue, alternative lifestyle issue (punk subculture)
Gerrit Köhler	Numerous accounts of malicious damage
Daniel Pfeiffer	Truant, not been at school for a year

- Aspen Education Group revealed in a job ad that children from Holland would also be in a show.

=== Series 2 ===
German Series 2: Catherine Freer - Wilderness program
Name	Age	Published problem
Andreas Engel	15	Serial burglar
David Pfaff	17	Drug issue
Dzeneta Beckenbauer	15	Street fighter
Kevin Osterhagen	15	Gang-member
Kurt Daecher	16	Political issue (Neo-nazi)
Pascal Sankt	17	Drug dealer
Stacy Gruenewald	17	High School drop-out
Vivien Thalberg	16	Runaway

=== Series 3 ===
The production company searched for new candidates for a third season. Filming did take place during the summer of 2008 at a wilderness program called Monarch Center in Colorado. It will be broadcast at RTL starting from 25 February 2009.

German Series 3: Monarch Center Colorado - Wilderness program
Name	Age	Published problem
Chrissi Trommler	15	LifeStyle issue (punk subculture)
Kevin Waechter	16	Being charged with assault, truancy
Jennifer Unger	14	Weak health by mother causing her to be too independent
Andreas Fuhrmann	16	Compulsive gambler
Linda Kalb	16	Street fighter
Moritz Mueller	17	Given up by his parents. Faces trial.

== Netherlands ==
The Netherlands version did after extended negotiations end up with a customized program, where the teenagers were sent to Kenya. It was called Van etter tot engel (English: From brat to angel) and was aired by RTL 5 in the fall of 2006. Keith Bakker was the teenagers' head coach.

Netherlands - Customized wilderness program in Kenya
Name	Age	Published problem.
Alexander Jansens	15	depressed
Demi Boogaard	15	Anger Issue
Donny Houtkooper	15	Anger Issue
Dormeshia Lucas	15	Anger Issue
Laurens Krantz	17	depressed
Maurice Claes	17	Alcohol issue, Internet Addiction Disorder
Roni Marqueringh	17	Drug issue, has been arrested by the police

== In the news ==
The UK version of the show generated some criticism. An influential children's charity, Barnardo's, expressed concerns that the TV show sends a message to parents that a short period of "tough love" can resolve any problems.

The show also received some criticism for an incident in which a young woman was forced to strip to their underwear and then made to have a cavity search, the initial stages of which were implied but not shown.
