= Greenville, Mississippi =

- City
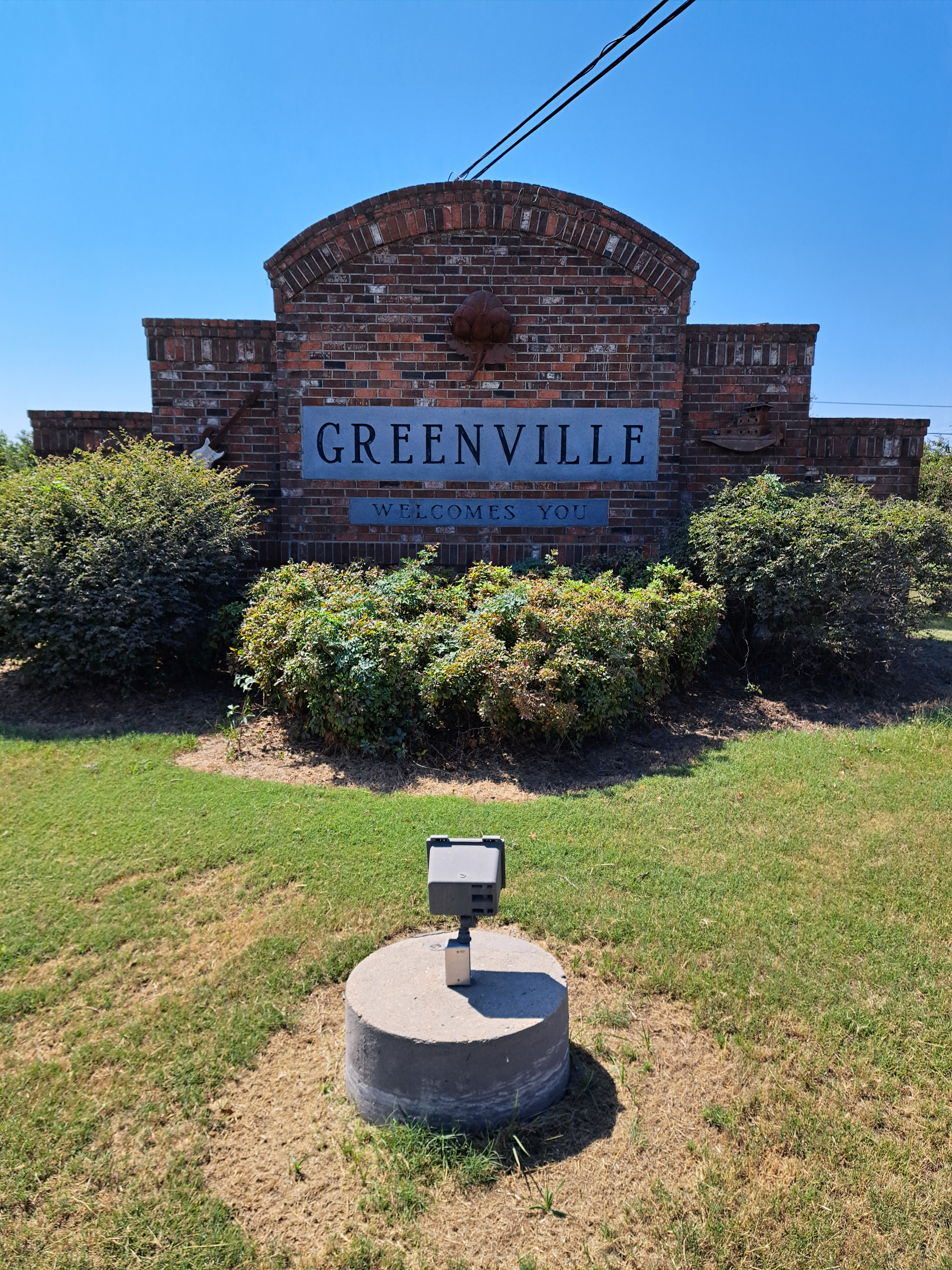
- Welcome Sign in Greenville

- Flag Seal
- Nicknames: The Heart & Soul of the Delta
- Motto(s): The Best Food, Shopping, & Entertainment in the South
- Location of Greenville in Washington County

- Location in the United States
- Coordinates: 33°23′05″N 91°02′54″W
- Country: United States
- State: Mississippi
- County: Washington
- Incorporated: June 24, 1870 (156 years ago)

Government
  - Type: Municipal government
  - Mayor: Errick Simmons (D)

Area
  - City: 27.67 sq mi (71.66 km^{2})
  - Land: 26.90 sq mi (69.66 km^{2})
  - Water: 0.77 sq mi (2.00 km^{2})
- Elevation: 125 ft (38 m)

Population (2020)
  - City: 29,670
  - Density: 1,103.2/sq mi (425.95/km^{2})
  - Urban: 38,300
- Time zone: UTC−6 (CST)
  - Summer (DST): UTC−5 (CDT)
- ZIP codes: 38701–38704, 38731
- Area code: 662
- FIPS code: 28-29180
- GNIS feature ID: 2403752
- Website: www.greenvillems.org

Greenville is the ninth-most populous city in the U.S. state of Mississippi, and the largest city by population in the Mississippi Delta region. It is the county seat of Washington County. The population was 29,670 at the 2020 Census.

== History ==
=== Early history ===
This area was occupied by indigenous peoples for thousands of years. When the French explored here, they encountered the historic Natchez people. As part of their colony known as La Louisiane, the French established a settlement at what became Natchez, Mississippi. Other Native American tribes also lived in what is now known as Mississippi.

The current city of Greenville is the third in the State to bear the name. The first, (known as Old Greenville) located to the south near Natchez, was the Jefferson County seat from 1803 to 1825 but became defunct soon after the American Revolution, as European-American settlement was then still concentrated in the eastern states. This ghost town was in no way related to the second Greenville except that they eventually shared a name.

Many migrants came to the area of the future, second Greenville, located approximately 150 miles north of the first Greenville, from the eastern and Upper South states, seeking land for developing cotton plantations, and this area became a trading center for the region's plantations. In 1830, the United States Congress passed the Indian Removal Act, which authorized the government to make treaties to revoke Native American land claims in exchange for lands west of the Mississippi River. They forced most of the Southeastern tribes to Indian Territory during the following decade.

After it became necessary to relocate the county seat of Washington County in 1844 due to the loss of land to the newly formed Issaquena County, the not-yet-established second Greenville was designated as the future county seat and finally became so upon its founding in 1847. American William W. Blanton filed for land from the United States government and was granted section four, township eighteen, range eight west; this plot now constitutes most of current downtown Greenville (the third). It was named by its founders for General Nathanael Greene, friend of President George Washington, for whom the county was named. This Greenville was thriving hamlet in the antebellum years, as cotton plantations developed in the area generated high profits for major planters. They used indentured Whites, captured Indians and African slaves as farmhands on the plantations.

Washington County's two previous county seats, New Mexico and Princeton, were located along the Mississippi River and had been eroded by the waters, to the point that they were destroyed. As county seat, Greenville was the trading, business, and cultural center for the large cotton plantations that surrounded it. Most plantations were located directly on the Mississippi and other major navigable tributaries. The interior bottomlands were not developed until after the Civil War.

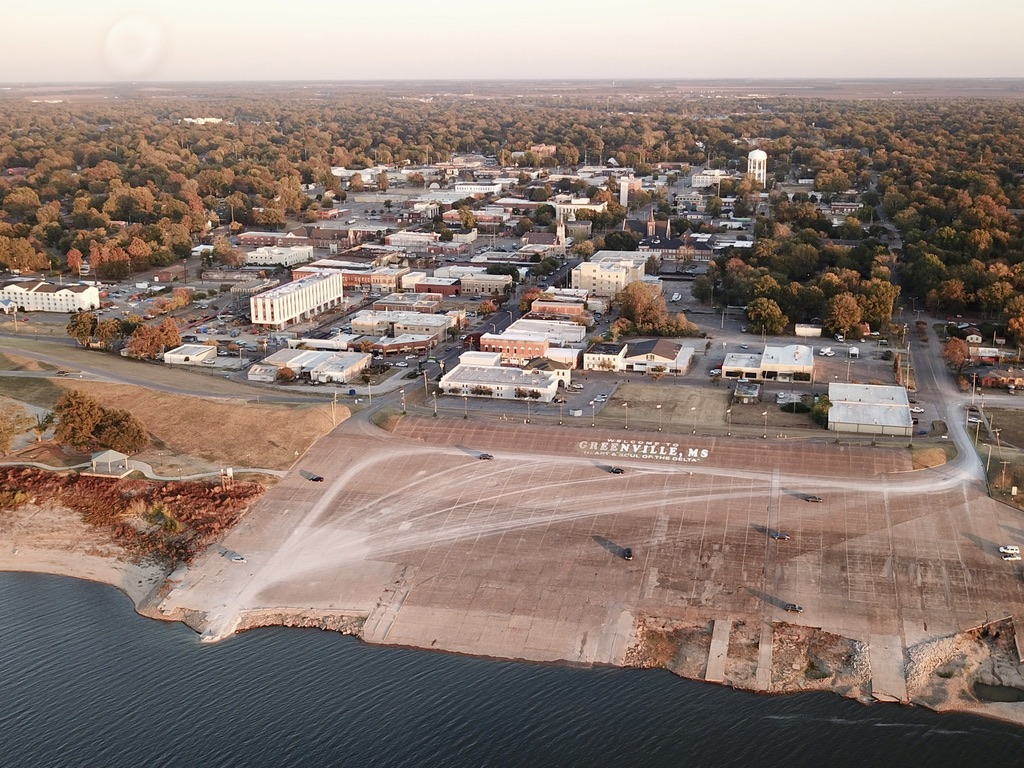
Greenville, seen from the Mississippi River

=== The destruction of Greenville and the Civil War ===
The town (the second Greenville, eventually also referred to as Old Greenville by its residents who may not have been familiar with Mississippi's first Greenville, which by then had disappeared) was destroyed during the Union Army's actions related to the siege of Vicksburg. Troops from a Union gunboat landed at Greenville. In retaliation for being fired upon, they burned every building. The inhabitants took refuge in plantation homes of the area. When the war ended, veterans of Mississippi regiments returned to find Greenville in a state of ruin.

The former residents soon decided to build again. They chose a new site (the third, current Greenville) three miles away, at the highest point on the Mississippi River between the towns of Vicksburg and Memphis. Much of the land belonged to the Roach and Blanton families; the major part of the area selected was within property owned by Mrs. Harriet Blanton Theobald. She welcomed the idea of a new Greenville, and donated land for schools, churches and public buildings. She was called the "Mother of Greenville". Major Richard O’Hea, who had planned the wartime defense fortifications at Vicksburg, was hired to lay out the new town.

Greenville recovered prosperity, still based on cotton, despite the decline in world markets for this commodity. In the early 20th century, its elite families had considerable political influence in the state, and US Senator Leroy Percy was from here. Several residences and other buildings from the late 19th and early 20th centuries have been listed on the National Register of Historic Places. It was a center of Delta culture in the early 20th century. This city adapted the former site to serve as industrial fill.

=== Nelson Street ===
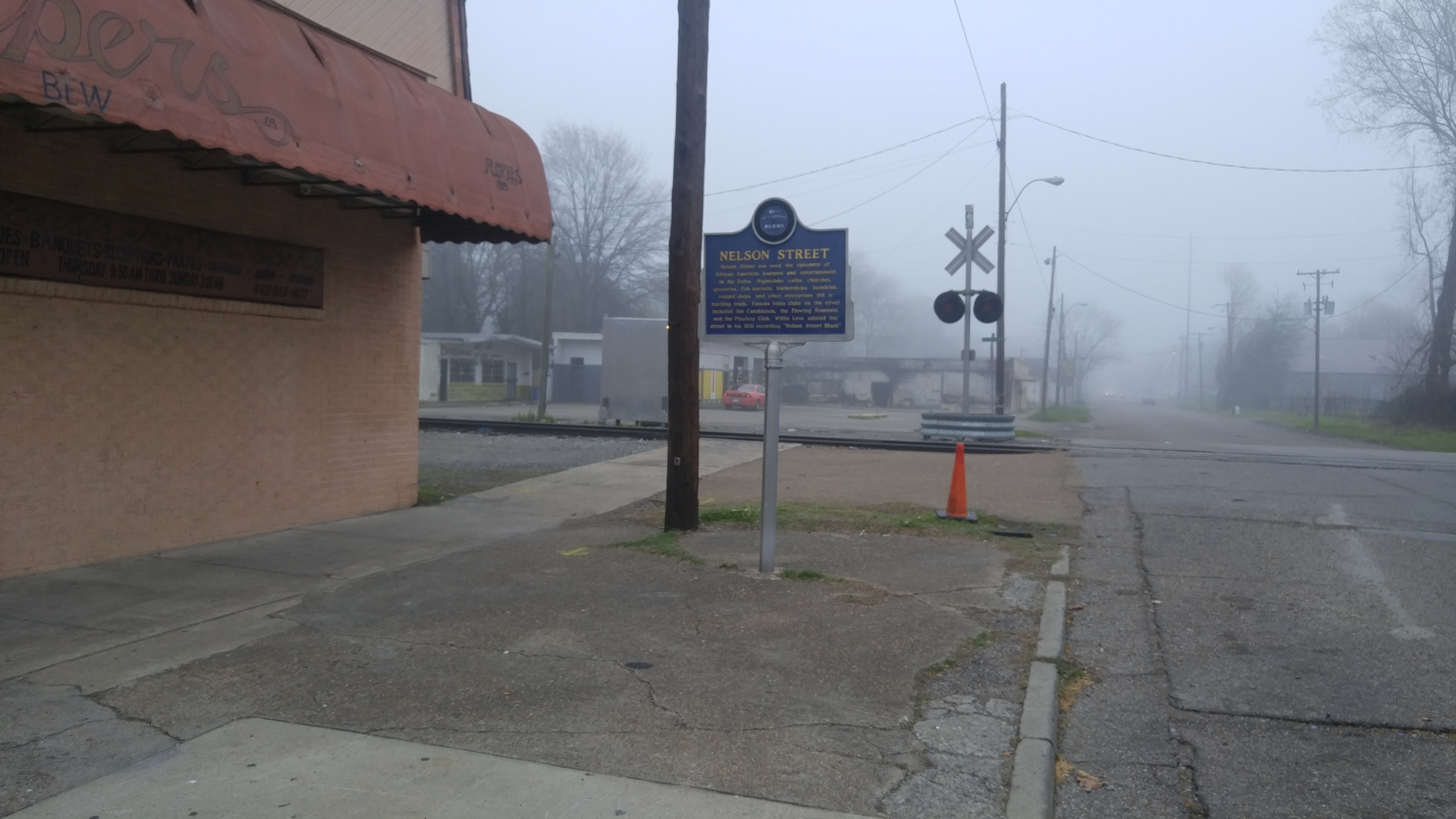
Nelson Street Mississippi Blues Trail Marker

African Americans in the Delta developed rich varieties of innovative music. Nelson Street is a historic strip of blues clubs that drew crowds in the 1940s and 1950s to the flourishing club scene to hear Delta blues, big band, jump blues and jazz. Record companies came to Greenville to recruit talent. It was similar to Beale Street in mid-20th century Memphis.

In the early 21st century, the Mississippi Blues Commission was established to commemorate this music in the state's history and culture. It has identified sites throughout the Delta as part of the Mississippi Blues Trail.

Southern Whispers Restaurant on Nelson Street in Greenville was the second site identified on this trail; this was a stop on the Chitlin' Circuit in the early days of the blues. The historic marker in front of the restaurant commemorates its importance in the history of the blues in Mississippi.

=== 21st century ===
In 2020 the city ordered churches to shut down to prevent the spread of COVID-19 and issued citations and fines to those attending a drive-in church gathering. The U.S. Justice Department intervened on behalf of the church.

== Geography ==
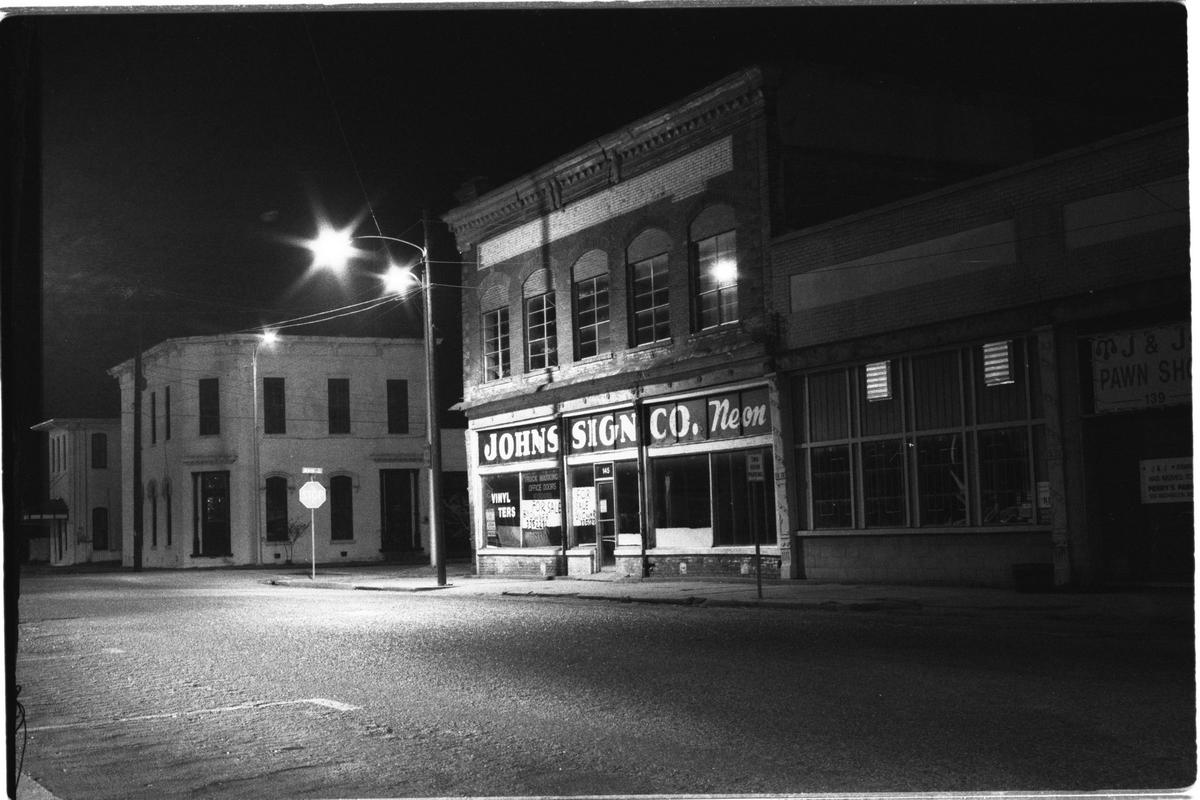
Walnut Street, 1994

Greenville is located on the eastern bank of Lake Ferguson, an oxbow lake left from an old channel of the Mississippi River.

One floating casino is located on the lake near the downtown area known as the Trop Casino Greenville, with a second just west of the city near the Greenville Bridge known as Harlow's Casino Resort. Chicago Mill and Lumber Co. operated a lumber mill on the lake two-tenths of a mile south of the casino levee parking lot; the mill specialized in making hardwood boxes until it closed.

According to the United States Census Bureau, the city has a total area of 27.7 square miles (72 km^{2}), of which 26.9 square miles (70 km^{2}) is land and 0.8 square miles (2.1 km^{2}) (2.82%) is water.

=== Climate ===
Climate data for Greenville Mid-Delta Airport, Mississippi, 1991–2020 normals, extremes 1953–present
Month	Jan	Feb	Mar	Apr	May	Jun	Jul	Aug	Sep	Oct	Nov	Dec	Year
Record high °F (°C)	82 (28)	85 (29)	87 (31)	91 (33)	96 (36)	102 (39)	103 (39)	106 (41)	103 (39)	99 (37)	88 (31)	84 (29)	106 (41)
Mean daily maximum °F (°C)	53.0 (11.7)	57.9 (14.4)	66.0 (18.9)	74.5 (23.6)	82.7 (28.2)	89.4 (31.9)	92.5 (33.6)	92.3 (33.5)	88.0 (31.1)	77.2 (25.1)	64.7 (18.2)	55.2 (12.9)	74.5 (23.6)
Daily mean °F (°C)	44.1 (6.7)	47.9 (8.8)	55.6 (13.1)	64.0 (17.8)	72.5 (22.5)	79.4 (26.3)	82.4 (28.0)	81.6 (27.6)	76.0 (24.4)	65.1 (18.4)	53.5 (11.9)	46.2 (7.9)	64.0 (17.8)
Mean daily minimum °F (°C)	35.1 (1.7)	37.9 (3.3)	45.2 (7.3)	53.5 (11.9)	62.4 (16.9)	69.3 (20.7)	72.4 (22.4)	70.9 (21.6)	64.0 (17.8)	53.0 (11.7)	42.4 (5.8)	37.1 (2.8)	53.6 (12.0)
Record low °F (°C)	8 (−13)	10 (−12)	21 (−6)	30 (−1)	36 (2)	52 (11)	60 (16)	50 (10)	41 (5)	29 (−2)	17 (−8)	10 (−12)	8 (−13)
Average precipitation inches (mm)	4.49 (114)	4.72 (120)	4.71 (120)	5.01 (127)	3.79 (96)	3.32 (84)	3.18 (81)	2.83 (72)	3.62 (92)	4.22 (107)	4.01 (102)	5.10 (130)	49.00 (1,245)
Average precipitation days (≥ 0.01 in)	9.2	10.5	10.4	8.5	9.5	7.5	8.6	7.5	7.0	8.2	8.0	9.4	104.3
Source: NOAA

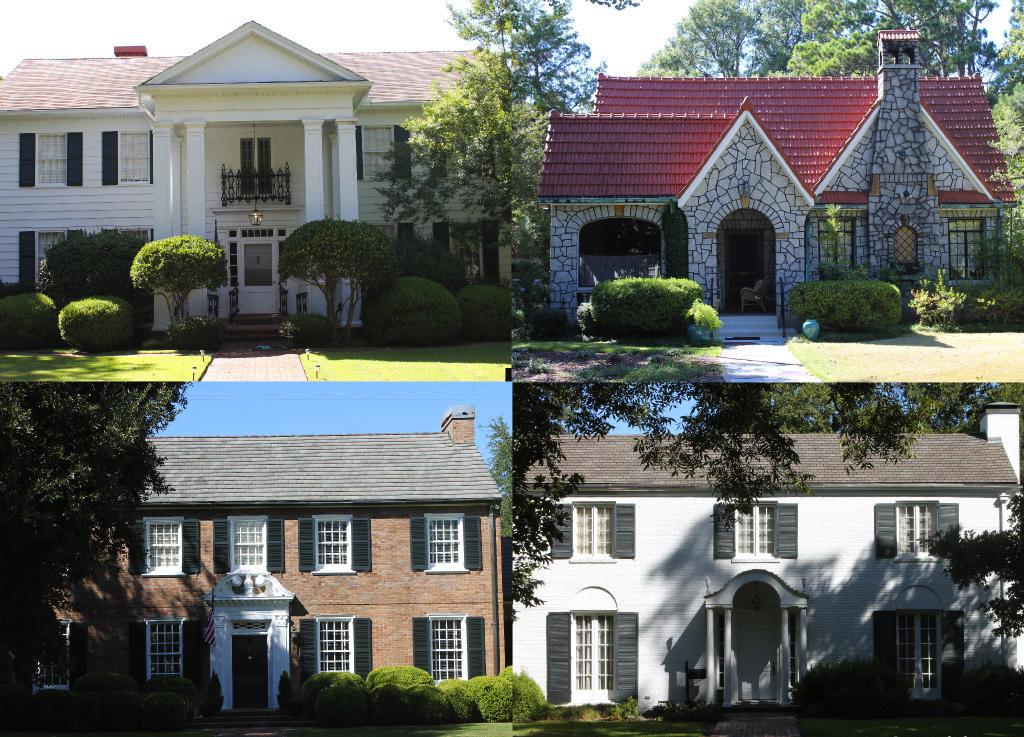
Gamwyn Park Historic District, Bounded by Gamwyn Park Dr., N. Gamwyn Dr., E. Gamwyn Dr., S. Dr., and W. Gamwyn Dr. Greenville

== Demographics ==
Historical population
Census	Pop.	Note	%±
1860	760		—
1870	890		17.1%
1880	2,191		146.2%
1890	6,658		203.9%
1900	7,642		14.8%
1910	9,610		25.8%
1920	11,560		20.3%
1930	14,807		28.1%
1940	20,892		41.1%
1950	29,936		43.3%
1960	41,502		38.6%
1970	39,648		−4.5%
1980	40,613		2.4%
1990	45,226		11.4%
2000	41,633		−7.9%
2010	34,400		−17.4%
2020	29,670		−13.7%
2023 (est.)	27,644		−6.8%
Sources: U.S. Decennial Census

=== Racial and ethnic composition ===
Greenville city, Mississippi – Racial and ethnic composition Note: the US Census treats Hispanic/Latino as an ethnic category. This table excludes Latinos from the racial categories and assigns them to a separate category. Hispanics/Latinos may be of any race.
Race / Ethnicity (NH = Non-Hispanic)	Pop 2000	Pop 2010	Pop 2020	% 2000	% 2010	% 2020
White alone (NH)	11,963	6,894	4,857	28.73%	20.04%	16.37%
Black or African American alone (NH)	28,871	26,750	23,874	69.35%	77.76%	80.47%
Native American or Alaska Native alone (NH)	28	45	43	0.07%	0.13%	0.14%
Asian alone (NH)	292	251	264	0.70%	0.73%	0.89%
Native Hawaiian or Pacific Islander alone (NH)	5	5	5	0.01%	0.01%	0.02%
Other race alone (NH)	8	6	142	0.02%	0.02%	0.48%
Mixed race or Multiracial (NH)	169	156	485	0.41%	0.45%	1.63%
Hispanic or Latino (any race)	297	293	269	0.71%	0.85%	0.91%
Total	41,633	34,400	29,670	100.00%	100.00%	100.00%

=== 2020 census ===
As of the 2020 census, Greenville had a population of 29,670 in 11,874 households and 7,405 families.

The median age was 40.3 years. 24.2% of residents were under the age of 18 and 18.1% of residents were 65 years of age or older. For every 100 females there were 84.3 males, and for every 100 females age 18 and over there were 80.1 males age 18 and over.

95.3% of residents lived in urban areas, while 4.7% lived in rural areas.

Of the 11,874 households, 30.8% had children under the age of 18 living in them. 26.5% were married-couple households, 20.3% were households with a male householder and no spouse or partner present, and 45.7% were households with a female householder and no spouse or partner present. About 33.7% of all households were made up of individuals and 14.4% had someone living alone who was 65 years of age or older.

There were 13,824 housing units, of which 14.1% were vacant. The homeowner vacancy rate was 2.0% and the rental vacancy rate was 15.4%.

Racial composition as of the 2020 census
Race	Number	Percent
White	4,857	16.4%
Black or African American	23,874	80.5%
American Indian and Alaska Native	43	0.1%
Asian	264	0.9%
Native Hawaiian and Other Pacific Islander	5	0.0%
Some other race	142	0.5%
Two or more races	485	1.6%
Hispanic or Latino (of any race)	269	0.9%

=== 2013 ACS ===
As of the 2013 American Community Survey, there were 33,928 people living in the city. 75.9% were African American, 21.7% White, 0.0% Native American, 0.8% Asian, 0.9% from some other race and 0.7% from two or more races. 1.2% were Hispanic or Latino of any race.

=== 2000 census ===
As of the census of 2000, there were 41,633 people, 18,784 households, and 14,422 families living in the city. The population density was 1,548.8 inhabitants per square mile (598.0/km^{2}). There were 16,251 housing units at an average density of 604.6 per square mile (233.4/km^{2}). The racial makeup of the city was 28.92% White, 69.60% Black, 0.07% Native American, 0.71% Asian, 0.01% Pacific Islander, 0.20% from other races, and 0.49% from two or more races. Hispanic or Latino of any race were 0.71% of the population.

There were 14,784 households, out of which 35.8% had children under the age of 18 living with them, 37.8% were married couples living together, 27.7% had a female householder with no husband present, and 29.5% were non-families. Of all households, 25.8% were made up of individuals, and 10.4% had someone living alone who was 65 years of age or older. The average household size was 2.77 and the average family size was 3.34.

In the city, the population was spread out, with 31.4% under the age of 18, 10.1% from 18 to 24, 26.3% from 25 to 44, 20.5% from 45 to 64, and 11.8% who were 65 years of age or older. The median age was 32 years. For every 100 females, there were 85.4 males. For every 100 females age 18 and over, there were 77.5 males.

The median income for a household in the city was $25,928, and the median income for a family was $30,788. Males had a median income of $29,801 versus $20,707 for females. The per capita income for the city was $13,992. About 25.7% of families and 29.6% of the population were below the poverty line, including 38.2% of those under age 18 and 23.6% of those age 65 or over.

=== 1990 census ===
As of the census of 1990, there were 45,226 people living in the city. The racial makeup of the city was 59.41% (26,867) Black or African American, 39.54% (17,881) White, 0.08% (37) Native American, 0.41% (185) Asian, and 0.01% (4) from other races. 0.56% (252) were Hispanic or Latino of any race.

== Government ==
Mayors of Greenville, Mississippi

Image	Mayor	Years	Notes
	?	1824–?	
	L. Wilczinski	1875–1887	
	R. W. Tilford	1887–1889	
	J. H. Wynn	1889–?	
		–?	
	J. T. Gooch	December 1919 – July 15, 1920	Resigned effective July 15, 1920 due to the need to conduct business away from the city
	J. Allen Hunt	July 15, 1920 – ?	Appointed mayor after resignation of J.T. Gooch
	?		
	Fred Schelben	1928–1932	
	E. G. Ham	1932–1934	
	Milton C. Smith	1934–1944	
	E. M. Gray	1944–1948	
	George F. Archer	1948–1964	
	Pat Dunne	1964–1976	
	William Burnley	1976– July 31, 1990	Defeated in a runoff election He was authorized to serve until August 8, 1990 but resigned effective July 31, 1990.
	Jerre Lane	July 31, 1990 – August 8, 1990	Vice Mayor Lane served as interim mayor after William Burnley's resignation
	Frank Self	August 8, 1990 – 1995	
	Paul Artman Jr.	1996–2003	
	Heather McTeer Toney	2004–2011	First African-American mayor
	Chuck Jordan	2012	Resigned effective September 24, 2012 after being diagnosed with pancreatic cancer.
	Carolyn Weathers	September 24, 2012 – October 24, 2012	Vice Mayor Weathers served as interim mayor after Chuck Jordan's resignation
	John Cox	October 24, 2012 – 2014	Elected in a special election on October 22, 2012, to complete Jordan's term; sworn in on October 24, 2012.
	Errick Simmons	2015–Present	2nd African-American mayor

== Transportation ==
=== Air ===
Greenville Mid Delta Regional Airport (GLH), located in unincorporated Washington County, northeast of downtown Greenville, serves the city and the Mississippi Delta region. Commercial passenger air service is currently provided by Denver Air Connection with nonstop flights to Dallas/Fort Worth (DFW) and Atlanta (ATL) on the Fairchild Dornier 328JET, and Contour Airlines with a nonstop Bombardier regional jet flight to Dallas/Fort Worth (DFW). Air service out of GLH is federally subsidized under the Essential Air Service program.

=== Transportation ===
U.S. Highway 61, U.S. Highway 82 and the Great River Road (Mississippi Highway 1) are the main transportation arteries through the Greenville area. U.S. Highway 82 is a major part of the Mississippi Delta's transportation network, as it connects to Interstate 55 and other major four-lane highways. In addition, the U.S. Highway 82 bypass is being constructed to provide a transportation route at the southern end of the Delta, connecting at the new Mississippi River Bridge and ending near Leland. The four-lane Greenville Bridge, a $206 million cable-stayed span crossing the Mississippi River into Arkansas, opened in 2010, replacing the two-lane Benjamin G. Humphreys Bridge, which opened in 1940.

=== Rail ===
The Columbus and Greenville Railway operates the Greenwood–Greenville rail line for freight traffic. North of Greenville, the Great River Railroad's line to Rosedale branches off.

== Economy ==
Since 2008, there were 10 grocery stores operated by ethnic Chinese people. There were 42 such stores in the city in 1951, but since then there had been a flight of ethnic Chinese from the Delta.

The per capita income in Greenville is $23,829.

== Education ==
Most of Greenville is served by the Greenville Public School District, while a small portion of the city lies in the Western Line School District. Greenville High School is the public high school of the Greenville district, while O'Bannon High School serves Western Line residents.

The private schools, Washington School and Greenville Christian School, also serve the city, as well as St. Joseph Catholic School (K-12), a parochial school which is part of the Roman Catholic Diocese of Jackson. The diocese formerly operated Our Lady of Lourdes Elementary School, which merged into St. Joseph in 2016.

The Greenville Higher Education Center offers non-credit community courses and credit courses from Delta State University, Mississippi Delta Community College (MDCC), and Mississippi Valley State University. All of Washington County is in the service area of MDCC.

== Media ==
Delta Democrat Times is the daily newspaper of the town.

== Sports ==
The Greenville Bucks were a minor-league baseball team in the Cotton States League from 1922 to 1955.

The Greenville Bluesmen were an independent minor league professional baseball team from 1996 to 2001 in Greenville.

The Mississippi Miracles, formerly the Mississippi Stingers, were an American Basketball Association franchise from 2004 to 2006 in Greenville.

== Sites ==
The Winterville Mounds Historic Site, with more than twelve earthwork mounds constructed by people of the Plaquemine Mississippian culture, is a survival north of the county seat of the deep indigenous history along the Mississippi River. This culture was particularly prominent from 13th to the 15th centuries, long before European exploration. Earthwork mounds were built by peoples in this area from the 9th century. The people in this region were influenced by the larger Mississippian culture, which built similar ceremonial sites throughout the Mississippi Valley and its tributaries. The historic Natchez people are considered the only contemporary surviving group of the Mississippian culture at the time of European exploration.

The Winterville Mounds has been designated as a state park and National Historic Landmark. A museum on the grounds displays artifacts recovered in professional excavations and adds to the interpretation of this complex, and the park has walking trails. It is located about 3 miles north of the city. It can be reached at 2415 Highway 1 N.

== In popular culture ==
The movies Crossroads (1986) and The Reivers (1969) were filmed in Greenville.

The movie Django Unchained (2012) is set in Greenville for some scenes.

Sherman's Restaurant, located on Main St. in Greenville, was featured in the first season of Gordon Ramsay's 24 Hours to Hell and Back.

== Notable people ==
=== Born in Greenville ===
- Steve Azar, country singer
- Eden Brent, blues boogie-woogie musician, composer, and performer
- Vivian Brown, meteorologist for The Weather Channel
- Charles Chew, (1922–1986), Illinois state senator; born in Greenville
- John Colbert, a.k.a. J Blackfoot, Soul singer with the Bar-Kays and Soul Children
- Tommy Davidson, actor/comedian
- Ross Davis, Negro league baseball player
- Tyrone Davis, blues musician
- Johnny Dollar, (1941–2006), Chicago blues guitarist, singer and songwriter
- Shelby Foote, author and historian
- Jimmie Giles, NFL tight end with Tampa Bay Buccaneers
- Quentin Groves, an American football linebacker with the Jacksonville Jaguars
- Brooks Haxton, poet and professor at Syracuse University
- Robert T. Henry, World War II soldier and Medal of Honor recipient
- Jim Henson, (1936–1990), puppeteer, television and film producer, creator of The Muppets
- Corey Holmes, all-star Canadian Football League player and Mayor of Metcalfe, Mississippi
- Lucy Somerville Howorth, feminist and New Deal lawyer
- Carla Hughes, convicted of murdering Avis Banks and her unborn baby.
- Antonio Johnson, NFL player for the Indianapolis Colts
- Germany Kent, model and media personality
- Cornelia Lampton, pianist
- Sam Chu Lin, pioneering Chinese American journalist
- John Ramsey Miller, writer and journalist
- Wilbert Montgomery, former NFL running back, member of Philadelphia Eagles Hall of Fame
- Neil Ratliff (1936-1994), music librarian
- Julia Evans Reed, author, journalist and columnist
- George Scott, MLB player for Boston Red Sox, Milwaukee Brewers, Kansas City Royals and New York Yankees
- Carol Schwartz, former member of Council of the District of Columbia
- Nellie Nugent Somerville, first woman elected to Mississippi Legislature, mother of Lucy Somerville Howorth
- LaToya Thomas, former professional basketball player in WNBA, first round draft pick of Cleveland Rockers
- Heather McTeer Toney, former mayor of Greenville and EPA regional administrator.
- Walter Turnbull, African American musician, founder of Boys Choir of Harlem
- Frank White, professional baseball player
- Mary Wilson, singer of The Supremes
- Benjamin Wright, (born July 11, 1946) is an American record producer, composer and arranger.

=== Greenville-related ===
- Ray Brown, NFL football player
- Hodding Carter, Pulitzer Prize-journalist, managed the city's Delta Democrat Times.
- Hodding Carter III, also a journalist, lived and worked here during and after the civil rights movement.
- Holt Collier is buried in Greenville. Collier was an African-American bear hunter and sportsman.
- Samuel Gibbs French (1818-1910), Confederate Major General, managed a plantation in Greenville
- John F. Harris, Mississippi State Representative from Greenville elected in 1890.
- Clarke Reed, Mississippi state Republican chairman from 1966 to 1976
- Thomas R. Yarborough, first Black city councilman in California

== Sister cities ==
- Kronach, Bavaria, Germany, since 2006
- Greenville, Liberia, since 2009

== See also ==
- List of municipalities in Mississippi
