= You and Me (Peking opera) =

- Poster for 2015 season production
- Company: NCPA
- Genre: Historical
- Show type: Peking opera
- Date of premiere: September 30, 2013

Creative team
- Playwright: Cai Fuchao
- Composer: Zhu Shaoyu
- Director: Zhang Yimou

You and Me (simplified Chinese: 天下归心; traditional Chinese: 天下歸心; pinyin: Tiānxià guīxīn; lit. 'Receiving the Support of the World') is a modern Peking opera by composer Zhu Shaoyu. Staged by Zhang Yimou, directing his first Peking opera, the show premiered at the National Centre for the Performing Arts, China (NCPA) in 2013. A 2014 performance of the opera was released on DVD by NCPA Classics in China, and Accentus overseas.

== Synopsis ==
Based on an episode from the Zuo zhuan, the play tells the true story of Duke Zhuang of Zheng and his mother Wu Jiang from the Spring and Autumn period.

== Cast ==
Role	Original	DVD	Other
Duke Zhuang of Zheng	Shang Changrong	Meng Guanglu	An Ping
Yingkaoshu	Chen Shaoyun	Chen Shaoyun	Yang Naipeng
Wu Jiang	Li Mingyan	Li Mingyan	Yuan Huiqin
Duchess Zhuang (Duke Zhuang's wife)	Shi Yihong	Shi Yihong	Zhang Huifang
Ji Lü	Zhu Shihui	Zhu Shihui	Xu Mengke
Yingkaoshu's mother	Kang Jing	Kang Jing	Zhai Mo
