= Turn-About Ranch =

Location
- 280 N 300 E Escalante, Garfield, Utah 84726; United States; 37°46′28.08″N 111°35′38.42″W

Information
- Established: 1989
- NCES School ID: A0702319

Turn-About Ranch is a residential treatment program and working cattle ranch in Escalante, Utah, United States, that enrolls adolescents. The program has been the subject of news coverage, lawsuits and multiple allegations by former participants and families.

== History ==
Turn-About Ranch was established in 1989 in Escalante, Utah. The program is marketed as a residential treatment program that combines therapy, academic schooling, and ranch work. The facility has appeared in television coverage and public discussions of U.S. "troubled teen" programs.

In December 2016 a staff member, James "Jimmy" Woolsey, died whilst trying to stop an escape attempt at Turn-About Ranch; a 17-year-old resident was arrested in connection with the incident and later faced criminal charges. The event was widely reported in national and local media, Garfield County Sheriff James Perkins stated to the media participants of the program have tried to run away before.

== Program ==
According to the program's website and promotional materials, Turn-About Ranch offers a residential environment with structured chores, counseling, and accredited schooling for adolescents. The program describes its combination of therapeutic services and a working ranch environment as aimed at behavioral and academic improvement.

== Controversies and legal issues ==
Turn-About Ranch has been the subject of allegations and litigation over the years. Former participants and some news reports have alleged that the program subjected adolescents to torture, including hours of stress positions, threats of violence, sexual assaults, exposure to animal abuse, public humiliation, sleep and food deprivation, forced labor, forcefeeding and verbal abuse. Some of these allegations were raised in lawsuits filed against the facility or its operators. Other reporting and advocacy groups have documented survivor accounts and complaints about treatment practices.

In 2021, former resident Hannah Archuleta sued Turn-About Ranch for an alleged sexual assault by a staff member that occurred in 2019. She alleged that after reporting the incident, she was punished with forced labor in below-freezing temperatures and being made to sleep on a wooden plank with no pillow, sit at a desk facing the wall for hours, and walk in circles around a horse corral. However, her lawsuit was dismissed based on procedural issues. She then sued Dr. Phil for allegedly pressuring her parents into sending her to the clinic without informing them about incidents that occurred on the ranch, including the death of Jimmy Woolsey. Her case against Dr. Phil was dismissed in 2022 due to California's Anti-SLAPP laws. Phil McGraw and CBS then proceeded to file a motion for $359,901 in Attorney fees and $42,065 in costs.

In 2021, Danielle "Bhad Bhabie" Bregoli uploaded a video to YouTube that recounted her experiences at Turn-About Ranch in 2016. She alleged that she was handcuffed by two "transporters" in the middle of the night and taken to the ranch. She also alleged that she was forced to sit in a tipi for three days upon arrival, being forbidden from sleeping, showering, or lying down. She claimed that residents were deprived of beds, warmth, and good food, that she witnessed other residents get restrained by staff, and that letters were intercepted. She criticized Dr. Phil for sending her to the ranch.

== Media coverage ==
Turn-About Ranch has been covered in international and national media, including Channel 4's programing on "Brat Camp"-style facilities and subsequent press coverage in newspapers and news outlets discussing the troubled-teen industry and specific incidents at the ranch.

The 2005 TV Show Brat Camp (Season 2) showing Turn-About Ranch, also showcases many of the allegations, from forcing teens to sleep on wooden bed boards with no mattress or pillow, to being forced to sit in a rock-circle for days on end.

Turn-About Ranch has also featured on the Dr. Phil show many times over years, with the host Phil McGraw recommending several guests attend their program.

== Reception and responses ==
Family members, advocacy groups and some former program participants have criticized Turn-About Ranch and similar facilities in the "troubled teen" industry, citing alleged mistreatment and calling for greater oversight and reform. The program and its operators have, in turn, emphasized their therapeutic mission and point to accreditation and program descriptions on their official materials.
