= Heather McTeer Toney =

American politician

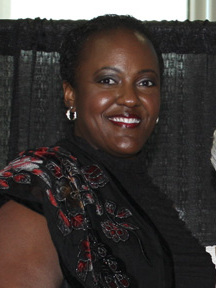

Mayor of Greenville, Mississippi
- In office 2004–2011
- Preceded by: Paul Artman Jr.
- Succeeded by: Chuck Jordan

Personal details
- Born: Greenville, Mississippi, U.S.
- Party: Democratic
- Spouse: Dexter Toney
- Children: 3
- Education: Spelman College (BA); Tulane University (JD)

Heather McTeer Toney is an American politician, environmentalist, attorney, and civil servant. In 2014, Toney was appointed as a regional administrator of the Environmental Protection Agency (EPA) for the Southeast region by President Barack Obama. Prior to this, Toney served as the first woman and African American to serve as mayor of Greenville, Mississippi, a position she held from 2004 to 2011.

== Early life and education ==
Toney was born to Victor McTeer, a civil rights attorney, and Mercidees "Dee Dee" McTeer, a public school teacher, in Greenville, Mississippi, where she was raised. Victor McTeer was one of the first African Americans to attend Western Maryland College (now McDaniel College) and, after graduating from Rutgers Law School in 1972, returned to his home state of Mississippi to practice law.

After high school, Toney attended Spelman College, where she became a member of the Alpha Kappa Alpha sorority, receiving a bachelor's degree in sociology.

Following the completion of her undergraduate education, Toney attended Tulane University Law School, where she received her Juris Doctor.

== Career ==
During her legal career, she primarily handled employment discrimination and medical malpractice cases.

=== Mayor of Greenville ===
In 2004, Toney became the first woman, first African American, and youngest person to serve as mayor of Greenville defeating Democratic incumbent mayor Paul Artman Jr. in the primary and then independent DeWitt "Buddy" Tucker with 4,393 votes compared to 393 for Tucker in the December 8, 2003 general election. Located in the Mississippi Delta, the poverty rate of Greenville is almost three times the national average. During her tenure as mayor, she was credited with helping the city resolve its debt crisis. Toney is a past president of the National Conference of Black Mayors. As mayor, she prioritized environmental issues, specifically with regards to protecting the local water supply. She did not seek reelection in the December 2011 election instead deciding to run for Mississippi's 2nd District congressional seat in the November 2012 election. She was succeeded by Chuck Jordan who defeated Carl McGee.

She was defeated by Bennie Thompson in the March 2012 Democratic primary for Mississippi's 2nd congressional district seat.

=== EPA ===
In 2009, Toney was nominated by then-EPA Administrator Lisa P. Jackson to serve as chairwoman of the EPA's Local Government Advisory Committee. Jackson was impressed by Toney's work combatting water pollution in Greenville. In 2014, Toney was nominated by President Obama to serve as Regional EPA Administrator for Region 4, consisting of Alabama, Georgia, Florida, Kentucky, Mississippi, North Carolina, South Carolina, Tennessee and six tribal nations. Region 4 has been referred to as a "historically troubled" region plagued by "energy apartheid," and the promotion of former Regional Administrator Gwen Keyes Fleming to the position of EPA Chief of Staff led to the position being vacant for a time prior to Toney's appointment.

Toney has been mentioned as a potential future administrator of the Environmental Protection Agency.

=== Environmental justice ===
Since leaving the EPA in 2017, Toney has involved herself in environmental justice organizing. Toney is the national field director for Moms Clean Air Force, which focuses on combatting air pollution. In 2019, Toney authored an op-ed for The New York Times where she argued that the need to combat climate change and protect the environment is a racial justice issue. Toney has criticized the mainstream environmental movement for ignoring the concerns of communities of color.

== Personal life ==
Toney is married to Dexter Toney and has three children.
