= Mary Radcliffe =

Mary Radcliffe may refer to:

- Lady Mary Tudor (1673–1726), English illegitimate daughter of Charles II and wife of Edward Radclyffe, 2nd Earl of Derwentwater
- Mary Ann Radcliffe (1746–1818), British figure in the early feminist movement
- Mary Arundell (courtier) (?–1577), English courtier; married name Radcliffe
- Mary Radcliffe (courtier) (1550–1617), Lady of the Bedchamber to Elizabeth I of England

== See also ==
- Radcliffe (disambiguation)
