= Harriet Byron McAllister =

American philanthropist (1798–1888)

Harriet Byron McAllister Blanton Theobald
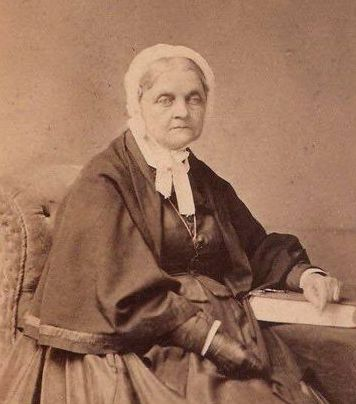
- Born: April 17, 1798; Greensborough, Georgia, US
- Died: January 23, 1888 (aged 89); Greenville, Mississippi, US
- Occupations: philanthropist, homemaker, plantation owner

Harriet Byron McAllister Blanton Theobald (April 17, 1798 – September 7, 1888) was an American philanthropist and is referred to as the "Mother of Greenville", Mississippi. She deeded much of her land and right of ways to what became the new site of Greenville, Mississippi after 1865.

== Biography ==
=== Early life ===
Harriet Byron McAllister was born to John Keith McAllister and Mary Smith on April 17, 1798, in Georgia. J.K. McAllister is native of Lisburn, County Antrim, Ireland and eventually migrated to the colonies through joining the British Legion during the American Revolutionary War. He served as a captain under the command of General Banastre Tarleton. During the route of Tarleton's forces, McAllister was captured at the Battle of Cowpens in 1781. He was paroled after the war and remained in Dinwiddie County, Virginia, where he married Mary Elizabeth Smith, and became a citizen of America. He entered the mercantile business in Charleston, South Carolina and then moved his family to Greene County, Georgia, where Harriet was born April 17, 1798. Four children were born to the family: Thomas Keith; Augustus William, Harriet Bryon, and Charlotte. In 1810, McAllister moved his family to the old town of Washington, Mississippi, near Natchez, Mississippi.

=== Blantonia and Greenville ===
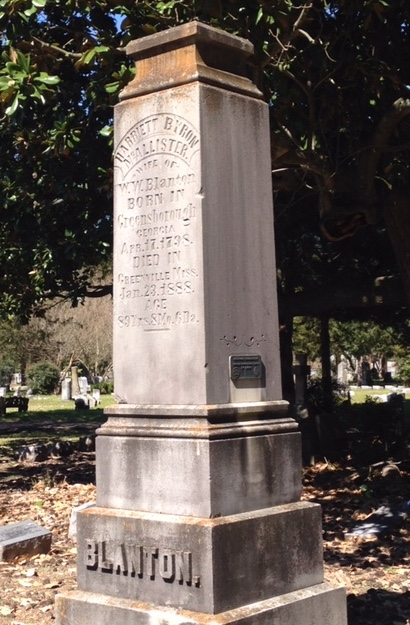
Headstone of Harriet Byron McAllister in Greenville Cemetery

William Whitaker Blanton married Harriet Byron McAllister in Walnut Hills, Mississippi on March 26, 1818. This was a time when the region was being established as a United States territory through the selling of lands by the Choctaw; during December 1817, Mississippi had been admitted as the 20th state in the union. Washington County, Mississippi was established in January 1827, and the couple settled there in 1828 where they obtained a plantation through land grants under Andrew Jackson’s administration. William and Harriet eventually had 10 children but only two survived (Orville Martin Blanton and William Campbell Blanton). The town of Greenville, Mississippi (named for General Nathaniel Greene of the American Revolutionary War) was established in 1846 as the third seat of government in Washington County. The community has shifted location twice, and present day Greenville is located slightly southwest of the first settlement. The original town site fell victim to flood waters of the Mississippi River.

Four generations of the Blanton family, circa 1880s (Greenville, MS)

Their plantation (Blantonia) was located on and around the current city of Greenville, Mississippi (the third town of Greenville). This plantation is not to be confused with the plantation of the same name in Lorman, Mississippi, also named Blantonia but owned within the same families. William Whitaker Blanton's parents John Blanton and Martha Belton "Patsy" Whitaker, originally from Virginia, moved to Kentucky but eventually the family established the Blantonia Plantation, near Red Lick/Lorman, Mississippi, just south of Vicksburg, Mississippi. Just before the start of the Civil War, Washington County's population was 15,679, with 14,467 of those residents enslaved to plantations such Blantonia.

After William Whitaker Blanton's death in 1838, Harriet Byron McAllister Blanton married Dr.Samuel Theobald on June 27, 1841. They had two children together but both did not survive. In total, she was the mother of 12 children, 10 by William and two by Samuel with only two that would survive.

=== The destruction of Greenville ===
Greenville, Mississippi was a pivotal town for General Ulysses S. Grant's northern operations in Mississippi during the Siege of Vicksburg campaign. Beginning at the end of March 1863, Greenville was the target of General Frederick Steele's C.S.A. soldiers. The design of this operation was to do reconnaissance of Deer Creek as a possible route to Vicksburg and to create havoc, cause damage to confederate soldiers, guerrillas and loyal (Confederate) landowners. Highly successful, Steele's men seized almost 1,000 head of livestock (horses, mules, and cattle) and burned 500,000 bushels of corn during their foray. In addition to the damage done, the Union soldiers also acquired several hundred slaves, who became U.S. soldiers. The first black regiments were formed during the Siege of Greenville; by the end of the operation, nearly 500 ex-slaves were learning the "school of the soldier."

In early May 1863, as retaliation for Confederate artillery firing on Union shipping on the Mississippi River, Commander Selfridge of the U.S. Navy ordered ashore 67 marines and 30 sailors, landing near Chicot Island. Their orders were to "put to the torch" all homes and buildings of those citizens guilty of aiding and abetting Confederate forces. By the end of May 9, the large and imposing mansions, barns, stables, cotton gins, overseer dwellings and slave quarters of Harriet Blanton's (Blantonia) and another plantations were completely destroyed. The destruction of Greenville was completed when a number of Union infantrymen slipped ashore from their boats and burned every building in the town but two (a house and a church).

=== Donation of Blantonia ===
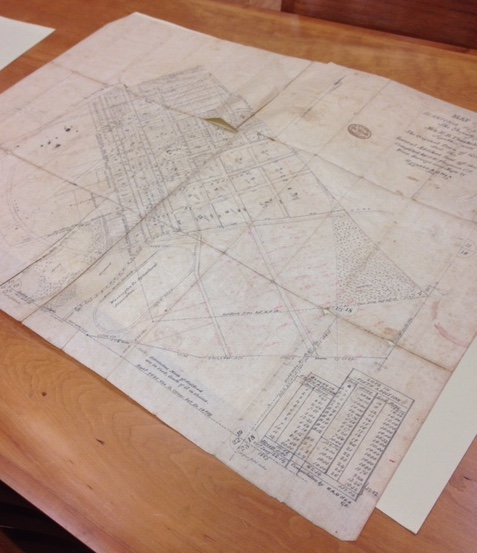
Layout of Major Richard O’Hea's original city plan, map

Greenville today is in its third location, three miles from the original site. At the end of the American Civil War, returning Confederate Mississippi regiments found their homes gone and their families scattered among area plantations. Following that destruction of Greenville, Mississippi by Federal Troops on September 1, 1865, Harriet Theobald and her two sons Orville and William donated 47.5 acres of the Blantonia Plantation to rebuild Greenville, earning her the nickname “Mother of Greenville.” In 1867, Major Richard O’Hea, who had planned the wartime defense fortifications at Vicksburg], was hired to lay out the new town; Theobald Street serves as the eastern boundary. The citizens erected a courthouse, a public school, and a library, and provided spaces for churches. Greenville was incorporated on June 24, 1870. By this time, the burned-out site of old Greenville was crumbling into the Mississippi River. The Blanton/Theobalds also sold off other portions of land for home owners.

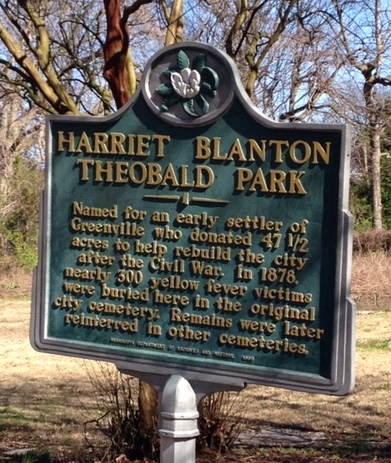
Blanton historic marker in Greenville MS

=== Later life ===
Harriet Theobald survived through other hardships the city of Greenville faced. In 1874, the citizens of Greenville suffered a city-wide catastrophe: the Great Fire of 1874, which destroyed 45 homes and 62 businesses, reducing the population of 890 to about 500. A second major fire hit the city a year later. Despite warnings of fire hazards, wood had been used as the major material for the construction for the post-Civil War Greenville. In 1877, a Yellow fever outbreak decimated the community and surrounding areas that stretched to Memphis, Tennessee. A third of the population died in Greenville, including the mayor and four of five councilmen. Soon after the city was chartered in 1886, a group of cotton planters, factors, buyers, and merchants organized a cotton exchange. Due to the fertile soil, cotton farming and processing became a huge boon to the economy and growth of Greenville during and after Harriet Theobold's lifetime in that city.

While in Monteagle, Tennessee in 1886 (aged 88) Harriet Byron McAllister tripped over a croquet wicket and fell suffering a fractured hip. She never fully recovered and died in Greenville on January 23, 1888, at the age of 89. Numerous sites bear her name in contemporary Greenville to include streets and parks.
