= Red Cliff =

Red Cliff or Red Cliffs may refer to:

== Places ==
- Red Cliffs, Victoria, Australia
- Red Cliff Air Station, Canada
- Chibi, Hubei, China
- Red Cliff, Greenland, Robert Peary's base during his Second Greenland Expedition
- Red Cliff, East Riding of Yorkshire, UK, a boulder clay cliff and archaeological site
- Red Cliff, Colorado, US
  - Red Cliff Bridge
- Red Cliff, Wisconsin, US

== Other ==
- Battle of Red Cliffs (208–209 AD), a battle near modern Chibi City, China
  - Red Cliff (Peking opera), an opera based on the Battle of Red Cliffs
  - Red Cliff (film), a 2008 Chinese film based on the Battle of Red Cliffs
- Red Cliff Band of Lake Superior Chippewa, a band of Ojibwe Indians in Wisconsin
- Xin Zhan: Red Cliff, a 2008 EP by Tibetan-Chinese singer Alan Dawa Dolma

== See also ==
- Redcliff (disambiguation)
- Redcliffe (disambiguation)
- Rotes Kliff ("Red Cliff")
