= Radcliffe (surname) =

Radcliffe is a surname. Notable people with the name include:

- Alex Radcliffe (1905–1983), American baseball player
- Ann Radcliffe (1764–1823), English novelist
- Aubrey Radcliffe (1933–2009), American academic
- Bill Radcliffe (1917–1984), Manx teacher and Manx-Gaelic language advocate
- Charles Radcliffe (1941–2021), English magazine editor
- Cyril Radcliffe, 1st Viscount Radcliffe (1899–1977), British lawyer
- Daniel Radcliffe (born 1989), English actor
- Egremont Radcliffe (died 1578), English rebel
- Eric Radcliffe (born 1950), British recording engineer and music producer
- George Radcliffe (politician) (1593–1657), English politician
- George L. P. Radcliffe (1877–1974), American politician from Maryland
- John Radcliffe, disambiguation
- Mark Radcliffe, disambiguation
- Mary Radcliffe, disambiguation
- Melva Radcliffe (1901–2012), American centenarian from New Jersey
- Mike Radcliffe (born 1944), Canadian politician
- Paula Radcliffe (born 1973), English athlete
- Percy Radcliffe (1916–1991), Manx politician
- Richard Radcliffe (died 1660), English politician
- Rosemary Radcliffe (born 1949), Canadian actress
- Seán Radcliffe (born 2005), Irish Activist
- Ted Radcliffe (1902–2005), American baseball player
- Timothy Radcliffe (born 1945), Master of the Order of Preachers (Dominicans)

== See also ==
- Radcliff (surname)
