= Ratcliff (surname) =

Ratcliff is a surname, and may refer to:

- Carter Ratcliff (born 1941), American art critic, writer and poet
- Cindy Cruse-Ratcliff (born 1963), American singer-songwriter
- Col Ratcliff (born 1929), Australian rugby league footballer
- Daniel Rowlinson Ratcliff (1837–1923), English lock and safe manufacturer and politician
- David Ratcliff (born 1970), American painter
- David Ratcliff (priest) (1937–2024), British Anglican priest
- Dominique Ratcliff (born 2001), American football player
- Ed Ratcliff (born 1983), American mixed martial artist
- Edward Ratcliff (soldier) (1835–1915), African American Union Army soldier and recipient of the Medal of Honor
- Edward C. Ratcliff (1896–1967), English Anglican priest and liturgical scholar
- Jason Ratcliff (born 1967), American NASCAR crew chief
- John Ratcliff (1848–1925), English cricketer
- Lewis Ratcliff (born 1981), English-Canadian lacrosse player
- Mary Curtis Ratcliff (born 1942), American visual artist
- Melissa Ratcliff (born 1976), Wisconsin politician
- Robert Ratcliff (1867–1943), English brewer and politician
- Roy Ratcliff (born 1947), American minister and author
- Sandy Ratcliff (1948–2019), English actress
- Trey Ratcliff (born 1971), American photographer, public speaker and writer
- Walter Ratcliff (1881—1978), American architect

== See also ==
- Ratliff
- Ratcliffe (surname)
- Radcliff (surname)
