= Chibi (Switzerland) =

Abandoned medieval locality in Vaud, Switzerland

Chibi was a medieval locality in the municipality of Aclens, in the Morges District, canton of Vaud, Switzerland. It lay north of the village, on the site of the present-day cemetery.

== History ==
The locality is attested as Chiblie in 1166, Chibi in 1182, and Chibliez between 1228 and 1282. It was the site of the church of Aclens, dedicated to Saint Lawrence, which belonged to the priory of Saint-Maire in Lausanne from 1166 and is attested as a parish church in 1228. In 1282 Jordane, lady of Cossonay, gave the tithe of Chibi to the priory of Cossonay.

The church, rebuilt in 1610, was abandoned in 1740–1741 when a small church was built in the village of Aclens for weekday services. The locality of Chibi is no longer mentioned on the map of Aclens of 1773.
