= Meshack Abel Mwankina =

Tanzanian footballer (born 1987)

Personal information
- Date of birth: 13 October 1987 (age 39)
- Place of birth: Dar es Salaam, Tanzania
- Height: 1.93 m (6 ft 4 in)
- Position: Defender

Team information
- Current team: Saraswati Youth Club

Senior career*
Years	Team	Apps	(Gls)
2007–2008	Mtibwa Sugar		
2008–2009	Simba		
2009–2010	African Lyon		
2010–2011	Simba		
2011–2012	Moro United		
2012–2013	Bandari		
2014	KCB	3	(0)
2014–2015	Polisi		
2015–2017	Lipuli		
2018–2019	Biashara United		
2019–	Saraswati Youth Club		

International career^{‡}
2007–2009	Tanzania	7	(0)
- * Club domestic league appearances and goals as of 10 May 2021 ‡ National team caps and goals as of 10 May 2021

Meshack Abel Mwankina (born 13 October 1987) is a Tanzanian football defender who plays for Saraswati Youth Club.
