= Keith Bakker =

American-Dutch sex offender and mental health practitioner (1960–2025)

- Born: Keith Benjamin Bakker; November 24, 1960; New York City, U.S.
- Died: April 7, 2025 (aged 64)
- Occupations: Mental health practitioner, television personality
- Television: Van etter tot engel, Family Matters
- Criminal charges: Sexual abuse, rape (2012) rape (2021)
- Criminal penalty: Sentenced to 5 years imprisonment in 2012 & 4.5 years imprisonment in 2021
- Criminal status: Deceased
- Website: keithbakkerofficial.com

Keith Benjamin Bakker (November 24, 1960 – April 7, 2025) was an American-Dutch mental health practitioner and convicted criminal. He specialized in drug rehabilitation and became known in the Netherlands for his addiction rehabilitation clinic, Smith & Jones, and appearances on several Dutch television programs.

Bakker was sentenced to prison for the sexual abuse of several of his female ex-clients, and had been detained from April 2011 to September 2014.

Bakker was convicted and sentenced on March 3, 2021, on the charge of rape of a minor and sentenced to 4.5 years of imprisonment.

== Personal life and death ==
Bakker grew up in Westport, Connecticut. He started using alcohol and drugs as a teenager, and used heroin for the first time on his eighteenth birthday. In the 1980s, Bakker worked as a roadie, traveling with Michael Jackson, Prince, and Bruce Springsteen, among others.

Bakker came to Amsterdam in 1985. In the following years, his addiction to drugs continued, and he contracted HIV from an infected syringe. In 1989, he came into contact with a social worker at Youth With A Mission, who helped him stop using drugs, and the two got married. Subsequently, Bakker became a music industry manager.

In 1996, Bakker relapsed into hard drug addiction. After a trial during which he threatened a police officer, he was sent to the Jellinek Clinic in Amsterdam, a drug addiction rehabilitation facility. In July 1998, he had a heart attack, which was the result of a drug overdose, but survived. A month later, Bakker had stopped using drugs after a stay in a hospital and following the Minnesota Model therapy program in Scotland.

Bakker died from heart failure on April 7, 2025, at the age of 64.

== Smith & Jones ==
In 2004, Bakker opened the Smith & Jones clinic for people with drug or alcohol addictions. In 2006 it became the first clinic in Europe to focus on people with a video game addiction. This was a result of him attempting to find complementary treatment for an existing client who he was treating for drug addiction and devised a program specially for him after not being able to outsource aid. The clinic had locations in Amsterdam and Wassenaar.

In the same period, Bakker also appeared regularly on Dutch television talk shows and reality series. He was a frequent guest on Spuiten en Slikken as an addiction expert, as well as coaching troubled teenagers (and their families) in Van etter tot engel and Family Matters. 2008 also saw the release of Bakker's biography entitled Pushing the Limits, written by Dutch author Leon Verdonschot.

By the end of 2009, during an interview with NCRV, Bakker falsely claimed that it was thanks to his clinic that he had managed to introduce the Twelve-Step Program to the Netherlands, which he had followed himself in Scotland, despite it already existing in the Netherlands before his clinic.

Having become involved in a renting conflict, Bakker resigned as manager of Smith & Jones in September 2010. The clinic itself closed shortly afterwards.

== Indictment and conviction ==
By the end of 2010, Bakker was accused of sexual abuse by several of his female clients. After an investigation by the Amsterdam vice squad, Bakker was arrested in April 2011 and was held on remand. During the trial in March 2012, Bakker admitted that he sexually abused some of his clients, but denied that the abuse involved non-consensual intercourse. In April 2012, the court convicted Bakker of sexual abuse and sentenced him to five years imprisonment and a ten-year prohibition from executing his profession as a mental health practitioner. His clinic, Smith & Jones, had already been declared bankrupt in March 2011.

Bakker was released from prison in September 2014.

Bakker was arrested on new charges of rape and violating his professional ban in 2019. He was subsequently convicted on the charge of rape and sentenced to 4.5 years imprisonment on March 3, 2021. After a successful appeal, his sentence was reduced to 18 months imprisonment. Subsequently, Bakker was released from prison on July 13, 2022.

== Goliath project ==
In 2018, Keith Bakker founded and launched the "Goliath project 2018”. The original "Goliath project" was launched in 2000 by him as well. The focus of the original Goliath project was cross-border healthcare inside the European Union based on Article 86 of the European treaty. As a result of his efforts, two major UK clinics, Castle Craig and the Priory group, were able to treat Dutch patients in the United Kingdom.

The Goliath project 2018 is an advocate/activist organization that is focused on medically managed addiction treatment for prisoners in the European Union. The basis for their efforts is article 3 of the EU human rights charter.
