= Ratcliffe =

Ratcliffe or Ratcliff may refer to:

== Places ==
=== United Kingdom ===
- Ratcliff or Ratcliffe, former hamlet, Tower Hamlets, London
- Ratcliffe-on-Soar, a village in Nottinghamshire
- Ratcliffe on the Wreake, a village in Leicestershire
  - Ratcliffe College, a school in Leicestershire
- Ratcliffe Culey, a village in Leicestershire

=== United States ===
- Ratcliff, Arkansas, a city
- Ratcliff, Texas, an unincorporated community
- Ratcliffe Manor, a former plantation house in Easton, Maryland

== People ==
- Ratcliff (surname)
- Ratcliffe (surname)

== Fiction ==
- Governor Ratcliffe (Disney), a fictionalized representation in the animated film Pocahontas of John Ratcliffe of the Jamestown colony
- Ratcliffe, Lancashire, setting for the British TV series Mandy

== See also ==
- Radcliffe (disambiguation)
- Nazanin Zaghari-Ratcliffe (born 1978), detainee in Iran
