= Radcliff (surname) =

Radcliff is a surname, and may refer to:

- Alistair Macdonald-Radcliff, English Anglican priest
- Benjamin Radcliff (1963–2024), American political scientist
- Bobby Radcliff (born 1951), American blues guitarist, singer and songwriter
- Damaine Radcliff (born 1979), American film actor
- David Radcliff (born 1934), American swimmer
- Dwight Radcliff (1932–2020), American Sheriff from Ohio
- Jacob Radcliff (1764–1844), American politician
- John Radcliff (1848–1911), American baseball player
- John Radcliff (Irish judge) (1765–1843), Anglo-Irish lawyer and judge
- Pamela Radcliff (born 1956), American historian
- Renee Radcliff (born 1959), American politician
- Rip Radcliff (1906–1962), American baseball player
- Ryan Radcliff (born 1990), American football quarterback
- Will Radcliff (1939–2014), American businessman who created the Slush Puppie

== See also ==
- Radcliffe (surname)
- Ratcliff (surname)
