= Keith Baker (footballer) =

English footballer

Personal information
- Date of birth: 15 October 1956
- Place of birth: Oxford, England
- Date of death: 2013
- Height: 5 ft 11 in (1.80 m)
- Position: Goalkeeper

Senior career*
Years	Team	Apps	(Gls)
1974–1976	Oxford United	0	(0)
1975	→ Grimsby Town (loan)	1	(0)
1975	→ Millwall (loan)	0	(0)
1976–1981	Witney Town		
1981–1987	Aylesbury United	350	(0)
1987–1988	Banbury United		
1988–19??	Buckingham Town		

International career
1972	England Schoolboys	2	(0)
- * Club domestic league appearances and goals

Keith Baker (15 October 1956 – 2013) was an English professional footballer who played as a goalkeeper.
