= Zhu Shaoyu =

Chinese composer

Zhu Shaoyu (朱绍玉; born 1946 in Beijing) in a Chinese composer. His opera You and Me was staged at China's National Centre for the Performing Arts (NCPA) in 2013.
