= Neil Ratliff =

Neil Mixon Ratliff (b Greenville, Mississippi, 22 Aug 1936; Washington, DC, 17 Sept 1994), was an American music librarian, and, until his death, served as Head of the Music Library at the University of Maryland, College Park, which included oversight of the International Piano Archives at Maryland (or IPAM).

He was Secretary-General of International Association of Music Libraries, and President of its United States branch.

== Publications ==
- Whistling, Carl Friedrich, Friedrich Hofmeister, and Neil Ratliff. 1975. Handbuch der musikalischen Litteratur ... A reprint of the 1817 edition and the ten supplements,'1818-1827. With a new introduction by Neil Ratliff. New York & London: Garland Pub ISBN 978-0-8240-1064-5
- Gottschalk, Louis Moreau, Richard Jackson, Neil Ratliff, and Gilbert Chase. The Little Book of Louis Moreau Gottschalk; Seven Previously Unpublished Piano Pieces. Transcribed and Edited, with an Introd. and Notes, by Richard Jackson and Neil Ratliff. Pref. by Gilbert Chase. With a Complete Facsim. of the Manuscripts. [New York]: New York Public Library, 1976. OCLC 144809310
