= John Ratcliff (cricketer) =

English cricketer (1848–1925)

Personal information
- Full name: John Ratcliff
- Born: 31 December 1848; Richmond-upon-Thames, Surrey, England
- Died: 11 August 1925 (aged 76); Twickenham, Middlesex, England
- Batting: Right-handed
- Role: Occasional wicket-keeper

Domestic team information
- Years: Team
- 1876: Surrey

Career statistics
Competition	First-class
Matches	4
Runs scored	69
Batting average	8.62
100s/50s	0/0
Top score	27
Catches/stumpings	1/–
- Source: Cricinfo, 21 April 2013

John Ratcliff (31 December 1848 – 11 August 1925) was an English cricketer. Ratcliff was a right-handed batsman who occasionally played as a wicket-keeper. He was born at Richmond-upon-Thames, Surrey.

Ratcliff made his first-class debut for Surrey against Gloucestershire at The Oval in 1876. He made three further first-class appearances for Surrey in that season, against Middlesex, the Marylebone Cricket Club, and Sussex. In his four first-class appearances, he scored a total of 69 runs at an average of 8.62, with a high score of 27.

He died at Twickenham, Middlesex on 11 August 1925.
