= Betty Ratcliffe =

British artist and ladies' maid (c. 1735 – c. 1810)

Elizabeth Ratcliffe (c.1735 – c.1810) was a British artist and lady's maid known for creating model buildings, which are displayed at Erddig, North Wales.

== Biography ==
Elizabeth (nickname, "Betty") Ratcliffe was born about 1735 in Chester to a clockmaker. She worked as a lady's maid to Dorothy Yorke, née Hutton, of Erddig. Her nickname there was 'Betty the little'.

Betty produced drawings and models at the request of her employers (and for the antiquarian Thomas Pennant). In 1767, she completed a model of a Chinese pagoda from vellum, mother-of-pearl, and coloured glass for Philip Yorke, Dorothy's son. In 1773, she completed a model of the Roman ruins of the Temple of the Sun in Syria, inspired by Robert Wood's engravings of the ruins published in 1753. Her other works held by the National Trust include paintings and needlework pictures.

Although Betty was a valued servant who had access to the house's resources and library, Dorothy's letters indicate that she asked Philip not to commission Betty again as Dorothy feared that she would lose Betty's service.

Betty died about 1810 in Liverpool.
