= John Ratcliffe (book collector) =

British book collector (1707–1776)

- Born: 1707
- Died: 1776 (aged 68–69)
- Occupation: Book Collector

John Ratcliffe (1707–1776) was an English book-collector.

== Life ==
Ratcliffe kept a chandler's shop in the borough of Southwark, and he started to collect books brought him as wrapping paper. He spent days in the warehouses of the booksellers, and every Thursday morning the major print and book collectors, including Anthony Askew, Croft, Topham Beauclerk, and James West, came to his house; after providing them with coffee and chocolate, he produced his latest purchases. His books were kept at his house in East Lane, Rotherhithe. He died in 1776, after spending thirty years in book collecting.

== Library sale ==
His library was sold by Christie in Pall Mall, London, the sale beginning on 27 March 1776, and lasting for nine working days. A priced copy of the catalogue (Bibliotheca Ratcliffiana) is in the British Museum; the collection comprised many old English black-letter books, thirty Caxtons, and some manuscripts. There were only 1,675 lots, but many consisted of numerous volumes. Four lots (10 to 13) comprised 155 plays. The last article but one was 'Mr. Ratcliffe's Manuscript Catalogue of the rare old Black Letter and other curious and uncommon Books,' in four volumes, which fetched £7 15s. The Caxtons fetched on an average £9 each.
