= Redcliffe Airport =

Redcliffe Airport may refer to:

- Redcliffe Airport (Australia), an airport serving Redcliffe, Queensland, Australia (ICAO: YRED)
- Redcliffe Airport (Vanuatu), an airport serving Redcliffe, Vanuatu (IATA: RCL, ICAO: NVSR)
