= Redcliffe Bridge =

Redcliffe Bridge may refer to:

- Redcliffe Bridge, Bristol, an opening bridge across Bristol Harbour in Bristol, England
- Mooro-Beeloo Bridge, formerly known as Redcliffe Bridge, a bridge across the Swan River in Perth, Western Australia
- Houghton Highway, a bridge connecting Brisbane and Redcliffe in Queensland, Australia
