= RedCliff Ascent =

Wilderness therapy program in Utah, U.S.

- Founded: 1993
- Headquarters: Utah, United States
- Services: Wilderness therapy
- Executive Director: Steven DeMille
- Website: redcliffascent.com

RedCliff Ascent is an American wilderness therapy program based in Enterprise, Utah, United States. The program takes place in the Escalante Desert.

== History ==
RedCliff Ascent was founded in 1993 as one of the early adopters of wilderness therapy programs.

The program was featured in the reality TV series Brat Camp which filmed in 2003 and aired on channel 4 in 2004, which showcased its therapeutic methods. It has received accusations of abuse and resulting lawsuits.

== Program details ==
RedCliff Ascent courses take place on 560 square miles of BLM land in the Escalante Desert area. Participants are provided with minimal gear, including a tarp, wool blanket, parachute cord, seat-belt webbing, and basic supplies like a cup, rice, lentils, raisins, oats, a sleeping bag, and a sleeping pad. They travel in groups of 12 or fewer, cook meals over a campfire, and sleep beneath tarps.

A New York Times article states that the majority of attendees are referred by the Utah Department of Youth Corrections, while the remaining participants, described as private students, are enrolled in the program by their parents.

== Bibliography ==
- Davis-Berman, Jennifer L. (2008). The Promise of Wilderness Therapy. Association for Experiential Education. ISBN 978-0-929361-16-1.
- Nisbet, Jo (2013). Laughing Star: A Story of Tough Love. Karnac Books. ISBN 978-1-78181-212-9.
- Szalavitz, Maia (2006). Help at Any Cost. ISBN 978-1-59448-910-5.
- Whaley, Lisa J. (2004). Reclaiming My Soul From The Lost and Found. 1st Books Library. ISBN 978-1-41407-230-2.
- DeMille, S. M. (2014). Narrative Family Therapy and Outdoor Behavioral Healthcare: A Treatment Manual. Doctoral dissertation, University of Louisiana Monroe.
- Russell, K. C. (2003). "An Assessment of Outcomes in Outdoor Behavioral Healthcare Treatment." Child and Youth Care Forum, 32(6), 355–381.
- Tucker, A. R., Norton, C. L., DeMille, S. M., & Hobson, J. (2016). "The Impact of Wilderness Therapy on Adolescent Depression: A Systematic Review and Meta-Analysis." Journal of Child and Family Studies, 25(9), 2719–2731.
- Gass, M. A., Gillis, H. L., & Russell, K. C. (2020). Adventure Therapy: Theory, Research, and Practice. Routledge.
