= Jack Ratcliffe =

English footballer

Personal information
- Full name: Jack Ratcliffe
- Date of birth: 10 March 1880
- Place of birth: Hyde, England
- Date of death: 1948 (aged 67–68)
- Position: Full back

Senior career*
Years	Team	Apps	(Gls)
1901–1902	Loughborough Corinthians		
1902–1906	Derby County	16	(0)
1906–1908	Middlesbrough	9	(0)
Total		25	(0)
- * Club domestic league appearances and goals

Jack Ratcliffe (10 March 1880–1948) was an English footballer who played in the Football League for Derby County and Middlesbrough.
