= Red Cliff (Peking opera) =

2008 Peking opera

- Company: NCPA
- Genre: Historical
- Show type: Peking opera
- Date of premiere: December 22, 2008
- Final show: November 1, 2017

Creative team
- Playwright: Cai Fuchao
- Composer: Zhu Shaoyu
- Director: Zhang Jigang

Red Cliff (Chinese: 赤壁; pinyin: chìbì) is a Peking opera by the China NCPA which premiered at the first anniversary of the National Grand Theatre in 2008. The director was the choreographer and PLA lieutenant general Zhang Jigang, best known as deputy chief director of the Beijing Olympic Games opening and closing ceremonies. It was written by Cai Fuchao and composed by Zhu Shaoyu.

In China the opera appeared in three versions - for older singers, youth, and children - as part of the educational purpose of the project. The opera then toured Europe.

== Synopsis ==
A dramatised account of the Battle of Red Cliffs in 208 AD, the play is based on relevant chapters from the 14th century novel Romance of the Three Kingdoms by Luo Guanzhong.

== Cast ==
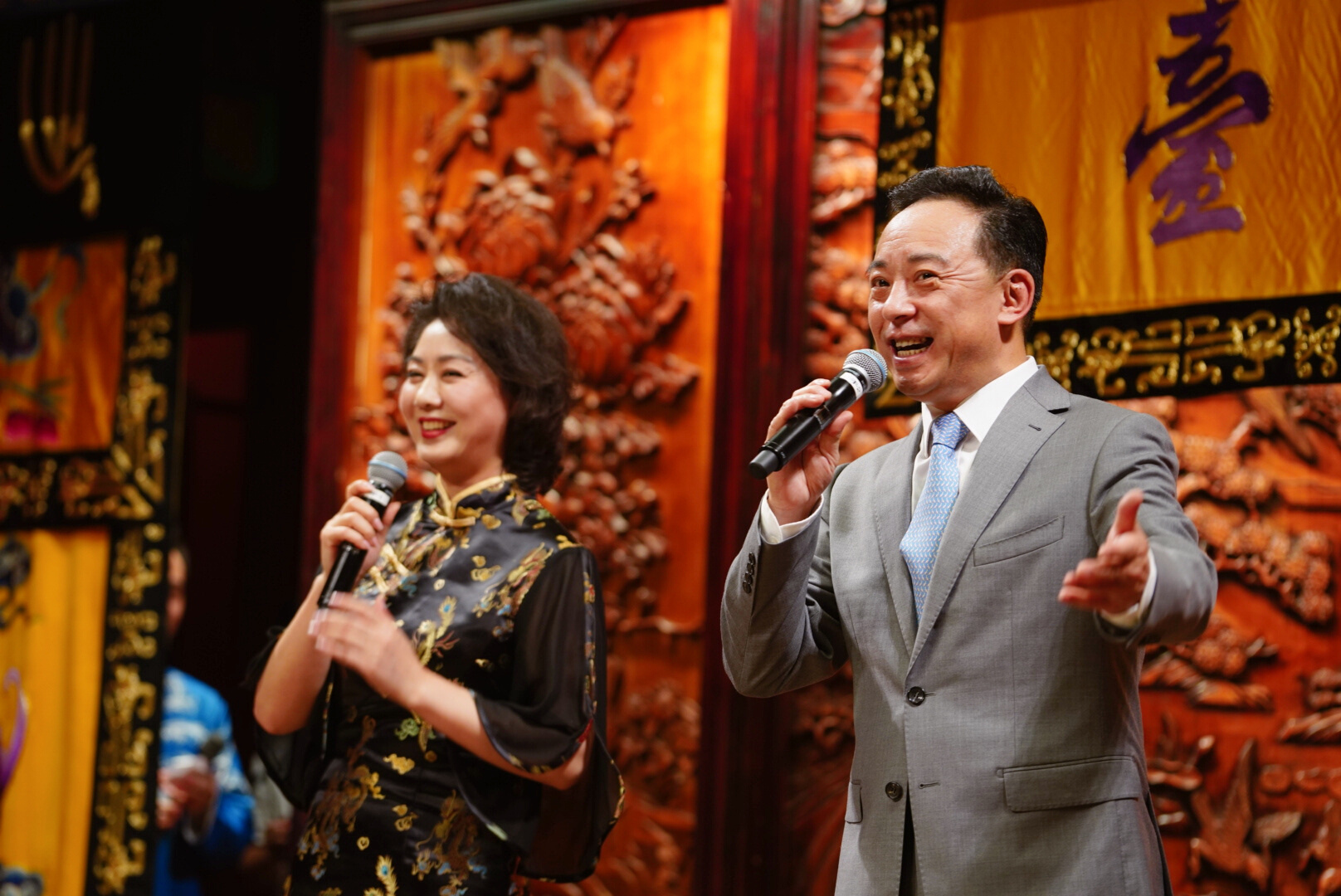
Li Shengsu and Yu Kuizhi in 2019.

Role	Original	Other
Zhuge Liang	Yu Kuizhi	Zhang Jianfeng
Zhou Yu	Li Hongtu	
Xiao Qiao	Li Shengsu	Dou Xiaoxuan
Cao Cao	Meng Guanglu	Wang Yue
Lu Su	Du Zhenjie	
Sun Quan	Chen Junjie	
Zhang Zhao	Zhu Qiang	
Yu Fan	Huang Baixue	
Bu Zhi	Huang Yanzhong	
Xue Zong	Zhang Kai	
Sun Shangxiang	Ding Guiling	Zhang Shujing
Emperor Xian of Han	Su Congfa	
Huang Gai	Qiu Jirong	Meng Xianteng
Meixiang (Xiao Qiao's maid)	Chen Zhangxia	
