= Meshack Ratliff =

State legislator

Meshack Stone Ratliff, also spelled Ratcliff, (November 20, 1832 - March 1, 1922) was a Confederate cavalry officer and state legislator in Virginia. He represented Buchanan County, Virginia and Wise County, Virginia in the Virginia House of Delegates from 1871 to 1873.

He was born in Claypool Hill, Virginia. He was a farmer, postmaster, and commissioner of revenue in Buchanan County, Virginia. He was from a large family and had 12 children.

He married Lucinda Ratliff in January 1850.

He was an officer in Company D of the 2nd Regiment Virginia State Line cavalry company during the American Civil War. He then served as a 1st Lieutenant in Company G of the 10th Kentucky Cavalry. and 14th Cavalry.
