= John Radcliffe =

John Radcliffe may refer to:

== Politics ==
- Sir John Radcliffe (MP, died 1441), English administrator and member of Parliament for Norfolk
- Sir John Radcliffe (MP, died 1568) (1539–1568), English member of Parliament for Grampound and Castle Rising
- John Radcliffe (St Albans MP) (1738–1783), English politician
- John Q. Radcliffe (1920–2001), Wisconsin state assemblyman

== Others ==
- John Radcliffe, 6th Baron Fitzwalter (1452–1496), English nobleman
- John Radcliffe (physician, born 1650) (1650–1714), English physician
  - John Radcliffe Hospital, Oxford, named after the above
- John Netten Radcliffe (1826–1884), English epidemiologist

== See also ==
- John Radcliff (1848–1911), American baseball player
- John Radclive (died 1911), Canadian hangman
- John Ratcliffe (disambiguation)
