= List of schools for the deaf =

This is a list of schools for the deaf, organized by country.

== Africa ==
=== Algeria ===
- L'Ecole des Sourds-Muets, Algiers

=== Egypt ===
- Institute for the Deaf, Cairo
- Institute for the Deaf, Alexandria
- School for the Deaf, Cairo
- School for the Deaf, Helouan
- Escole pour les Sourds, Alexandria

=== Kenya ===
- Humble Hearts School
- Kisii School for the Deaf

=== Tanzania ===
- Tabora Deaf-Mute Institute

== Americas ==
=== Argentina ===
- Instituto Nacional de Sordo-mudos(Boys), Buenos Aires
- Instituto Nacional de Sordo-mudos (Girls), Buenos Aires

=== Bolivia ===
- Patronato Nacional de Ciegos y Sordos, La Paz

=== Brazil ===
- Instituto Nacional de Surdos-Mudos, Rio de Janeiro
- Instituto Santa Terezinha, São Paulo
- Instituto Paulista de Surdos- Mudos, São Paulo
- Instituto Pestalozzi, Sections for the Deaf, Rio de Janeiro
- Instituto Pestalozzi, Sections for the Deaf, Belo Horizonte
- Instituto Pestalozzi, Sections for the Deaf, Rio Grande do Sul
- Instituto Santa Luzia, Section for the Deaf, Porto Alegre, Rio Grande do Sul
- Instituto Ipiranga, Porto Alegre, Rio Grande do Sul
- Instituto Central do Povo, Section for the Deaf, Rio de Janeiro

=== Canada ===
School	Established	City	Province	Grades	Nickname
Alberta School for the Deaf	1956	Edmonton	Alberta	1-12	Eagles
British Columbia School for the Deaf	2002	Burnaby	British Columbia	K-12	Grizzlies
E. C. Drury School for the Deaf	1963	Milton	Ontario	K-12	Spartan (High School) & Beaver (Elementary School)
MacKay School for the Deaf	1964	Montreal	Quebec	K-6	
Manitoba School for the Deaf	1985	Winnipeg	Manitoba	PreK-12	
Metro Toronto School for the Deaf	1962	Toronto	Ontario	K-8	Dragons
Robarts School for the Deaf	1973	London	Ontario	K-12	Hawks
Sir James Whitney School for the Deaf	1870	Belleville	Ontario	K-12	Wolves

=== Chile ===
- 0Escuela de Ciegos y Sordo-Mudos, Santiago

=== Costa Rica ===
- Escuela de Ensenanza Especial, San Jose

=== Colombia ===
- Instituto de Sordomudos, Bogota
- Escuela de Ciegos y Sordo-mudos, Medellin
- Instituto Colombiano para Ciegos y Sordomudos, Bogota
- Escuela de Ciegos y Sordo-mudos, Cali

=== Cuba ===
- Instituo Nacional de Sordo-mudos, Marianao
- Instituto de Reeducation de Sordomudos, Camaguey

=== Guatemala ===
- Escuela de Abnormales y Sordo-mudos, Campo de Marte

=== Honduras ===
- Escuela de Sordo-Mudos, Tegucigalpa, D.C, first school for the deaf in Central America

=== Jamaica ===
- St. Christopher's School for the Deaf, St. Ann

=== Mexico ===
- Escuela Nacional de Sordo-Mudos, Mexico City D.F.

=== Nicaragua ===
- Escuela de Ensenanza Especial, Managua

=== Peru ===
- Escuela de Sordos y Mudos, Lima

=== Puerto Rico ===
- St. Gabriel's School for the Deaf, Santurce

=== Trinidad ===
- The Deaf & Dumb School, Port of Spain

=== United States ===
In the United States multiple states operate specialized boarding and/or statewide schools for the deaf, along with the blind; in most states the two groups had separate statewide schools, though in some they are combined.

In 2003, in addition to Nebraska, which closed its residential deaf school in 1998, New Hampshire and Nevada do not have state-operated schools for the deaf.

==== Deaf Residential Schools ====
School	Est.	City	State	Grades	Nicknames	Conferences
Alabama Institute for the Deaf and Blind	1858	Talladega	Alabama	PreK-12	Silent Warriors	MDSDAA
Lexington School for the Deaf	1864	East Elmurst	New York	PreK-12	Blue Jays	ESDAA
Alaska State School for the Deaf and Hard of Hearing	1973	Anchorage	Alaska	PreK-12	Otter	
American School for the Deaf	1817	Hartford	Connecticut	K-12	Tigers	ESDAA 1
Arizona State Schools for the Deaf and Blind	1912	Tucson	Arizona	PreK-12	Sentinels	WSBC
Arkansas School for the Deaf	1849	Little Rock	Arkansas	PreK-12	Leopards	GPSD
California School for the Deaf, Fremont	1860	Fremont	California	PreK-12	Eagles	Clerc Classic
California School for the Deaf, Riverside	1950	Riverside	California	PIP-12	Cubs	Clerc Classic
Colorado School for the Deaf and Blind	1874	Colorado Springs	Colorado	PreK-12	Bulldogs	Independent
Delaware School for the Deaf	1929	Newark	Delaware	K-12	Blue Hawks	ESDAA 1
Eastern North Carolina School for the Deaf	1964	Wilson	North Carolina	PreK-12	Fighting Hornets	MDSDAA
Florida School for the Deaf and Blind	1885	St. Augustine	Florida	PreK-12	Dragons	MDSDAA
Georgia School for the Deaf	1846	Cave Spring	Georgia	PreK-12	Tigers	MDSDAA
Governor Baxter School for the Deaf	1957	Falmouth	Maine	PreK-12	Islanders	ESDAA 2
Hawaii School for the Deaf and the Blind	1914	Honolulu	Hawaii	K-12	Dolphins	Independent
Idaho School for the Deaf and the Blind	1906	Gooding	Idaho	K-12	Raptors	WSBC
Illinois School for the Deaf	1839	Jacksonville	Illinois	PreK-12	Tigers	Independent
Indiana School for the Deaf	1843	Indianapolis	Indiana	PreK-12	Orioles	Clerc Classic
Iowa School for the Deaf	1855	Council Bluffs	Iowa	PreK-12	Bobcats	GPSD
Kansas State School for the Deaf	1861	Olathe	Kansas	PreK-12	Jackrabbits	GPSD
Kentucky School for the Deaf	1823	Danville	Kentucky	PreK-12	Colonels	MDSDAA
Louisiana School for the Deaf	1852	Baton Rouge	Louisiana	PreK-12	War Eagles	MDSDAA
Maryland School for the Deaf	1973	Columbia	Maryland	PreK-8	Orioles	ESDAA 1
Maryland School for the Deaf	1868	Frederick	Maryland	K-12	Orioles	ESDAA 1
Michigan School for the Deaf	1848	Flint	Michigan	PreK-12	Tartars	Independent
Minnesota State Academy for the Deaf	1863	Faribault	Minnesota	PreK-12	Trojans	GPSD
Mississippi School for the Deaf	1854	Jackson	Mississippi	PreK-12	Bulldogs	MDSDAA
Missouri School for the Deaf	1851	Fulton	Missouri	PreK-12	Eagles	GPSD
Model Secondary School for the Deaf	1969	Washington	District of Columbia	9-12	Eagles	Clerc Classic
Montana School for the Deaf and Blind	1893	Great Falls	Montana	PreK-12	Mustangs	
Marie H. Katzenbach School for the Deaf	1883	Trenton	New Jersey	PreK-12	Colts	ESDAA 1
New Mexico School for the Deaf	1885	Santa Fe	New Mexico	PreK-12	Roadrunners	GPSD
New York State School for the Deaf	1875	Rome	New York	PreK-12	Trojans	ESDAA 2
North Carolina School for the Deaf	1894	Morganton	North Carolina	PreK-12	Bears	MDSDAA
North Dakota School for the Deaf	1890	Devils Lake	North Dakota	PreK-12	Bulldogs	GPSD
Ohio School for the Deaf	1829	Columbus	Ohio	PreK-12	Spartans	ESDAA
Oklahoma School for the Deaf	1907	Sulphur	Oklahoma	PreK-12	Bison	GPSD
Oregon School for the Deaf	1870	Salem	Oregon	K-12	Panthers	WSBC
Rochester School for the Deaf	1876	Rochester	New York	PreK-12	Wildcats	ESDAA 2
South Carolina School for the Deaf and Blind	1849	Spartanburg	South Carolina	PreK-12	Hornets	MDSDAA
Tennessee School for the Deaf	1845	Knoxville	Tennessee	PreK-12	Vikings	MDSDAA
Texas School for the Deaf	1856	Austin	Texas	PreK-12	Rangers	Clerc Classic
The Learning Center for the Deaf	1970	Framingham	Massachusetts	PreK-12	Galloping Ghosts	ESDAA 1
Utah School for the Deaf and Blind	1884	Ogden	Utah	PreK-12	Eagles	WSBC
Virginia School for the Deaf and the Blind	1839	Staunton	Virginia	PreK-12	Cardinals	MDSDAA
Washington School for the Deaf	1886	Vancouver	Washington	K-12	Terriers	WSBC
West Virginia Schools for the Deaf and Blind	1870	Romney	West Virginia	PreK-12	Lions	ESDAA 2
Western Pennsylvania School for the Deaf	1869	Edgewood	Pennsylvania	PreK-12	Lions	ESDAA 1
Wisconsin School for the Deaf	1852	Delavan	Wisconsin	PreK-12	Firebirds	GPSD

==== Deaf Day Schools ====
School	Est.	City	State	Grades	Nicknames	Conferences
47 The American Sign Language and English Secondary School	1908 (sep. 2005)	New York City	New York	9-12		
Atlanta Area School for the Deaf	1972	Clarkston	Georgia	PreK-12	Panthers	Independent
Beverly School for the Deaf	1876	Beverly	Massachusetts	PreK-12		
Central Institute for the Deaf	1914	St. Louis	Missouri	PreK-6		
Clarke Schools for Hearing and Speech	1867	Northampton	Massachusetts	PreK-8		
Clarke Schools for Hearing and Speech	1995	Boston	Massachusetts	PreK		
Clarke Schools for Hearing and Speech	1996	Jacksonville	Florida	PreK		
Clarke Schools for Hearing and Speech	1999	New York City	New York	PreK		
Clarke Schools for Hearing and Speech	2001	Philadelphia	Pennsylvania	PreK		
Horace Mann School for the Deaf and Hard of Hearing	1869	Allston	Massachusetts	PreK-12	Cougars	
Jean Massieu School of the Deaf	1999	Salt Lake City	Utah	PreK-12		
Kendall Demonstration Elementary School	1857	Washington	District of Columbia	PreK-8	Wildcats	
Lexington School and Center for the Deaf	1865	New York City	New York	PreK-12	Blue Jays	
Marlton School	1968	Los Angeles	California	K-12	Eagles	
Metro Deaf School	1993	St. Paul	Minnesota	PreK-12	Cheetahs	
Moog Center for Deaf Education	1996	St. Louis	Missouri	PreK-2		
New York School for the Deaf	1817	White Plains	New York	PreK-12	Golden Tornadoes	
Pennsylvania School for the Deaf	1820	Philadelphia	Pennsylvania	PreK-12	Panthers	
Phoenix Day School for the Deaf	1967	Phoenix	Arizona	PreK-12	Roadrunners	WSBC
Rhode Island School for the Deaf	1876	Providence	Rhode Island	PreK-12	Roosters	
St. Joseph's School for the Deaf	1869	The Bronx	New York	PreK-8		
St. Rita School for the Deaf	1915	Cincinnati	Ohio	PreK-12		
Summit Speech School	1967	New Providence	New Jersey	Preschool		
Tucker Maxon School	1947	Portland	Oregon	PreK-5		
West Tennessee School for the Deaf	1986	Jackson	Tennessee	PreK-6		
Willie Ross School for the Deaf	1967	Longmeadow	Massachusetts	PreK-12		

==== Defunct Deaf Schools ====
School	Established	Closed	City	State	Grades
Austine School for the Deaf	1904	2014	Brattleboro	Vermont	PreK-12
Boston School for the Deaf	1899	1994	Randolph	Massachusetts	PreK-12
Central North Carolina School for the Deaf	1975	2000	Greensboro	North Carolina	K-8
Detroit Day School for the Deaf	1893	2012	Detroit	Michigan	PreK-8
North Carolina School for Colored Deaf and Blind	1869	1967	Raleigh	North Carolina	PreK-8
Nebraska School for the Deaf	1869	1998	Omaha	Nebraska	K-12
Scranton State School for the Deaf	1880	2009	Scranton	Pennsylvania	PreK-12
South Dakota School for the Deaf	1880	2011	Sioux Falls	South Dakota	PreK-12
Texas Blind, Deaf, and Orphan School	1887	1965	Austin	Texas	PreK-8
Virginia School for the Deaf, Blind and Multi-Disabled at Hampton	1909	2008	Hampton	Virginia	PreK-12
Wyoming School for the Deaf	1961	2000	Casper	Wyoming	PreK-12

Higher education

- Gallaudet University
- National Technical Institute for the Deaf (est. 1965)
- California State University, Northridge

Recreational organizations

- Project Insight

=== United States territories ===
School	Est.	City	Territory	Grades	School type
Christian School and Chapel for the Deaf	1959	Luquillo	Puerto Rico	K-12	Private Christian school

=== Uruguay ===
- Escuela de Sordomudos, Montevideo

=== Venezuela ===
- Instituto para Sordo-Mudos, Caracas

== Asia ==
=== India ===
- Dr. M. G. R. Home and Higher Secondary School for the Speech and Hearing Impaired
- Pratheeksha (special school)

=== Japan ===
- Fukui Prefectural School for the Deaf
- National University Corporation Tsukuba University of Technology (deaf program)
- Central School for the Deaf

=== Korea ===
- Gwangju Inhwa School

=== Malaysia ===
- SMK Pendidikan Khas Persekutuan

=== Nepal ===
- Naxal School for the Deaf

=== Pakistan ===
- Family Educational Services Foundation (Deaf Reach Program)
- Ida Rieu School

=== Philippines ===
- Bohol Deaf Academy
- CAP College Foundation
- De La Salle–College of Saint Benilde
- International Deaf Education Association
- Manila Christian Computer Institute for the Deaf
- Miriam College
- Philippine School for the Deaf

== Europe ==
=== France ===
- Institut National de Jeunes Sourds de Paris

=== Italy ===
- Antonio Provolo Institute for the Deaf

=== Ireland ===
- Claremont Institution

=== Sweden ===
- Manillaskolan
- Birgittaskolan

=== United Kingdom ===
- Bulmershe Court (offers BA in Theatre Arts, Education and Deaf Studies)
- Centre for Deaf Studies, Bristol
- Donaldson's College
- Jordanstown Schools
- Mary Hare School
- Nottinghamshire Deaf Society
- Ovingdean Hall School (1891-2001)
- Seashell Trust
- St John's Catholic School for the Deaf

== Oceania ==
=== Australia ===
- Royal Institute for Deaf and Blind Children
- Victorian College for the Deaf

=== New Zealand ===
- Kelston Deaf Education Centre
- Van Asch College

== See also ==
- PEN-International
