= ESD =

ESD may refer to:

== Science ==
- ESD (gene), a human gene/enzyme
- Electrostatic discharge, a sudden flow of electricity between two electrically charged objects
- Electrostatic-sensitive device, any component which can be damaged by common static charges
- Energy spectral density, a part of a function in statistical signal processing
- Environmental secondary detector, a gaseous detection device used with environmental scanning electron microscopes
- Equivalent spherical diameter, a diameter of a sphere of equivalent volume
- Extreme subdwarf, a type of star

== Medicine ==
- End-systolic dimension, the diameter across a ventricle in the heart
- Endoscopic submucosal dissection, a medical therapy with endoscopy

== Education ==
- Education for sustainable development, international learning methodology
- Educational service district (disambiguation), regional education unit in some U.S. states
- Episcopal School of Dallas, day school in Texas, U.S.
- Evangelical School for the Deaf, in Luquillo, Puerto Rico

== Government and law ==
- Electronic services delivery, government services provided through the Internet or other electronic means
- Empire State Development Corporation, an American public benefit umbrella organization
- Employment Security Department, a Washington state unemployment agency
- Examination support document, a submission to the United States Patent and Trademark Office

== Technology ==
- Electronic smoking device, a device that simulates the feeling of smoking
- Electronic software distribution, delivery of digital media content
- ESD format, a file format
- Emergency shutdown, the stoppage of a process plant in certain hazardous conditions
- Engineering Society of Detroit, a multi-disciplinary association in Michigan, U.S.
- Enlightened Sound Daemon, audio software
- Environmentally sustainable design, complying with the principles of ecological sustainability in the design of objects and buildings

== Transport ==
- Elmstead Woods railway station (station code), in London, England
- Esen Air (ICAO airline designator), a defunct airline from Kyrgyzstan
- Essendon railway station, Melbourne
- A US Navy hull classification symbol: Expeditionary transfer dock (ESD)
- Orcas Island Airport (IATA code), Eastsound on Orcas Island, Washington, United States

== Other uses ==
- East Side Digital Records, an American record label
- Eta Sigma Delta, an American honor society
