= ESDS =

ESDS may refer to:

- Economic and Social Data Service, in the United Kingdom
- Entry Sequenced Data Set

== See also ==
- ESD (disambiguation)
