= PDSD =

PDSD may refer to the following:

- Parallel and Distributed Solutions Division of Intel Corporation
- Penn-Delco School District, a public school district in Delaware County, Pennsylvania
- Phoenix Day School for the Deaf, a state-run public school in Phoenix, Arizona; see Arizona State Schools for the Deaf and Blind
- Proton-Driven Spin Diffusion, a mechanism in solid-state NMR by which dipolar-coupled nuclear spins exchange polarization indirectly through nearby protons.
