= Governor Baxter =

Governor Baxter may refer to:

- Elisha Baxter (1827–1899), 10th Governor of Arkansas
- George W. Baxter (1855–1929), territorial governor of Wyoming
- Percival P. Baxter (1876–1969), 53rd Governor of Maine
  - Governor Baxter School for the Deaf, named for Percival Proctor Baxter
