= GBSD =

GBSD may refer to:

- Governor Baxter School for the Deaf
- Ground Based Strategic Deterrent
