= Toronto School =

Toronto School may refer to:

- Toronto School of Art
- Toronto School of Business
- Toronto school of communication theory
- Toronto school of history
- Toronto School of Theology

== See also ==
- Metro Toronto School for the Deaf
- Toronto District School Board
