= Jolanta Lapiak =

Canadian artist and deaf activist

Jolanta A. Lapiak is a Canadian media creative, deaf activist, and creator of Handspeak, an online American Sign Language dictionary.

== Education and career ==
Lapiak was born in 1972 in Wrocław, Poland, and later moved to Canada, where she attended the Alberta School for the Deaf.

While in high school, Lapiak swam competitively, receiving a bronze medal in the 4 × 100 m freestyle relay at the 1985 World Games for the Deaf and a silver and a gold medal at the 1989 Games in the 100m butterfly and the 200m butterfly (world record), respectively.

She graduated with a BA from Gallaudet University in 1994 and went on to earn a BFA in Media Arts & Digital Technologies from the Alberta College of Art & Design and a MFA in Media Arts from NSCAD University.

Lapiak has spent her career working as a literary and media creative and activist.

== Deaf World Web ==
The Deaf World Web was founded by Lapiak on February 5, 1995, as a "multipurpose deaf-related website, providing information on all subjects from sociocultural resources to references around the world."

The website included several pioneering resources such as the Deaf World News, which linked to current news articles, job opportunities, and other items of interest to the Deaf community. Other features included a directory of services and information for the Deaf/deaf and hard of hearing around the world, categorized by country, an encyclopedia of information on various relevant topics, and an embedded search engine which facilitated user access to relevant resources. Also present on the website was the ASL Dictionary Online, the original iteration of what would later branch off to become Handspeak.

The Deaf World Web was awarded the Canadian Association of the Deaf "Award of Merit" in 1998.

The website lasted for several more years until being shut down on January 31, 2001, but the Sign Language Dictionary Online was preserved and continued at handspeak.com.

== Handspeak ==
Handspeak is an online sign language dictionary founded by Lapiak as the Sign Language Dictionary Online in April 1996 as part of the Deaf World Web. It split off and took the name Handspeak in April 2000.

The website includes an English to ASL dictionary of signs with videos showing how each sign is articulated along with a variety of other resources.
