= NYSD =

NYSD may refer to:

- New York School for the Deaf (NYSD)
- United States District Court for the Southern District of New York, variously as NYSD or SDNY
- New York State Senate District (NYSD), the various districts for the New York State Senate
- North Yorkshire and South Durham Cricket League (NYSD)

== See also ==
- New York State School for the Deaf (NYSSD)
- SDNY, abbreviation for Southern District of New York
