= Eastern Schools for the Deaf Athletic Association =

U.S. interscholastic athletics organization

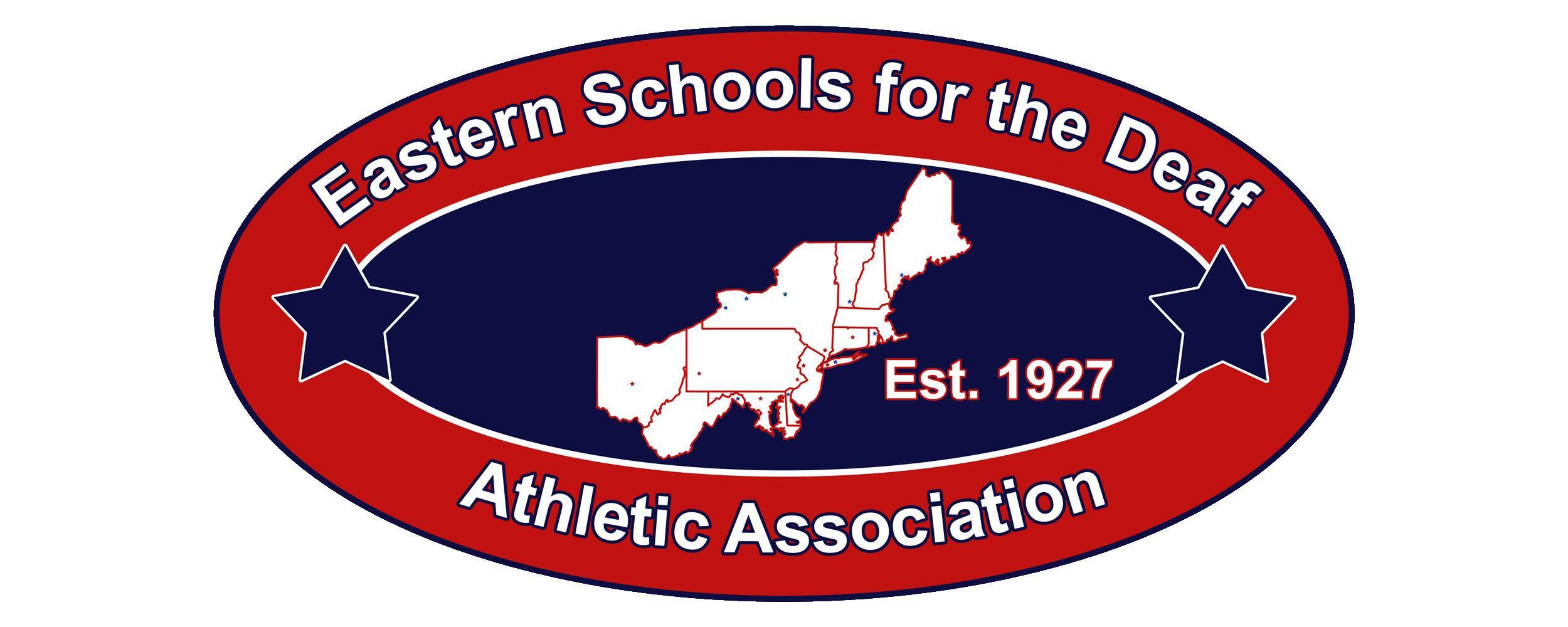
- Abbreviation: ESDAA
- Formation: 1927
- Legal status: Association
- Purpose: Athletic/Educational
- Members: 17 Deaf Schools
- Official language: ASL and English
- Affiliations: National Federation of State High School Athletics Association (NFSHSAA) & National Deaf Interscholastic Athletic Association (NDIAA)
- Website: www.esdaa.org

The Eastern Schools for the Deaf Athletic Association (ESDAA) is an organization that oversees and regulates deaf interscholastic athletics in the US States of Connecticut, Delaware, Maryland, Massachusetts, New Jersey, New York, Ohio, Pennsylvania, Rhode Island, Virginia, and West Virginia. The ESDAA is headquartered at the Lexington School for the Deaf in East Elmhurst, New York. ESDAA is the oldest Deaf High School Athletic Association in the US, founded in 1927. We recently became a nonprofit 501c3 organization in December 2023.

== Members ==
From 1927 to present, 24 schools were members of ESDAA. Only 17 schools remains today. Ohio School for the Deaf, which joined in 2015, is the new and most-recently added member. Virginia School for the Deaf and Blind rejoined the conference in 2021.

Current member schools:

- American School for the Deaf (West Hartford, Connecticut)
- Delaware School for the Deaf (Newark, Delaware)
- Lexington School and Center for the Deaf (Queens, New York)
- Marie H. Katzenbach School for the Deaf (Trenton, New Jersey)
- Marie Philip & Walden School – The Learning Center for the Deaf (Framingham, Massachusetts)
- Maryland School for the Deaf (Frederick, Maryland)
- Mill Neck Manor School for the Deaf (Mill Neck, New York)
- New York School for the Deaf (White Plains, New York)
- New York State School for the Deaf (Rome, New York)
- Ohio School for the Deaf (Columbus, Ohio)
- Pennsylvania School for the Deaf (Philadelphia, Pennsylvania)
- Rhode Island School for the Deaf (Providence, Rhode Island)
- Rochester School for the Deaf (Rochester, New York)
- St. Mary's School for the Deaf (Buffalo, New York)
- Virginia School for the Deaf and the Blind (Staunton, Virginia)
- West Virginia Schools for the Deaf and Blind (Romney, West Virginia)
- Western Pennsylvania School for the Deaf (Edgewood, Pennsylvania)

Former member schools:

- Austine School (Brattleboro, Vermont)
- Boston School for the Deaf (Randolph, Massachusetts)
- Governor Baxter School for the Deaf (Mackworth Island, Maine)
- Kendall School (Washington, D.C.)
- Model Secondary School for the Deaf (Washington, D.C.)
- St. Joseph's School for the Deaf (New York City, New York)
- Scranton School for Deaf and Hard-of-Hearing Children (Scranton, Pennsylvania)

== Sports ==
- Basketball (boys and girls)
- Cheerleading
- Soccer (boys and coed)
- Track and Field
- Volleyball (girls)

== History ==
ESDAA is the oldest Deaf High School Athletic Association in the US, founded in 1927. That year Fred Moore, a teacher at the Marie H. Katzenbach School for the Deaf in New Jersey, organized the first boys' basketball tournament. The nine participating schools in this first tournament included Kendall, Fanwood, Pennsylvania, American, New Jersey, St. Joseph's, Lexington, Virginia and Maryland. The Katzenbach School (New Jersey) emerged as the first team to win ESDAA boys' basketball championship. Boys' basketball was expanded to three divisions in 1994 then formed back to two divisions in 2008.

The trophy presented to the winner of the ESDAA Division I boys' basketball tournament is known as the George Harlow Trophy; the winning team keeps this trophy for one year and passes it on to the winner the following year. Hence, it is called a "traveling trophy".

The girls' basketball tournament was formed in 1977. The first tournament was hosted by the Maryland School for the Deaf and the first champion was Model Secondary School for the Deaf. The girls' basketball tournament grew quickly so that in 1979 it was formed into two divisions.

The girls' volleyball tournament was first formed in 1981, and Model Secondary School for the Deaf was the first champion. The first Division II girls' volleyball tournament was held in 1999, and Delaware School for the Deaf was the first team to win ESDAA Division II volleyball title.
