= Metropolitan Toronto (disambiguation) =

Metropolitan Toronto (1953–1998) is a former municipality in Ontario, Canada.

Metropolitan Toronto or Metro Toronto may also refer to:

- Metro Toronto Convention Centre
- Toronto Metropolitan University
- Metro Toronto School for the Deaf

== See also ==
- Toronto Metro (disambiguation)
- Greater Toronto Area
