= Toronto Metro =

Toronto Metro can refer to:

- Toronto subway, rapid transit system
- Metropolitan Toronto, a defunct level of government

== See also ==
- Metropolitan Toronto (disambiguation)
