= Christine Hart =

Canadian politician

The Honourable Christine Hart ECO
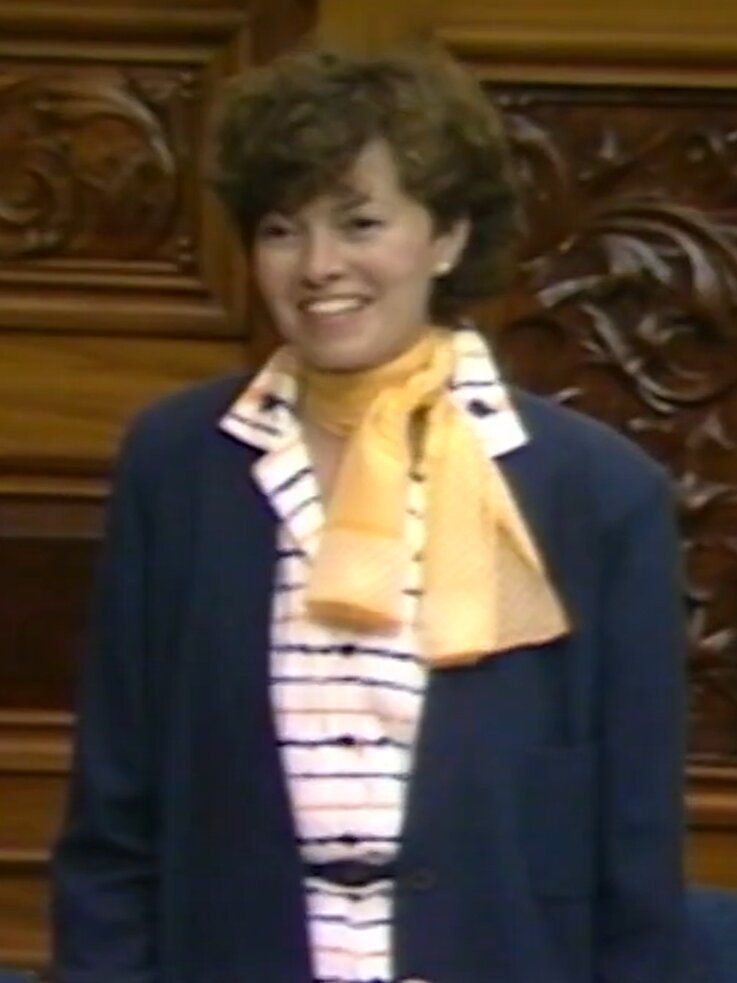
- Hart in 1986

Ontario MPP
- In office 1986–1990
- Preceded by: Robert Elgie
- Succeeded by: Gary Malkowski
- Constituency: York East

Personal details
- Born: February 3, 1950 (age 76) Halifax, Nova Scotia
- Party: Liberal
- Occupation: Lawyer; mediator; director

Christine Hart (born February 3, 1950) is a former politician in Ontario, Canada. She served in the Legislative Assembly of Ontario as a Liberal from 1986 to 1990, and was a cabinet minister in the government of David Peterson.

== Background ==
Hart was born in Halifax, Nova Scotia. Her father was a court of appeal judge. She graduated from the law school at the University of Toronto in 1973 and worked for law firms Weir and Foulds, Morris/Rose/Ledgett and Lerners in Toronto. When she entered public life in 1986, Hart was known as one of Canada's experts in transportation law.

== Politics ==
She was elected to the Ontario legislature in a by-election, held on April 17, 1986, in the Toronto riding of York East. Hart defeated her closest opponent, Progressive Conservative Gina Brannan, by 1,391 votes in a riding formerly held by the PCs. She was re-elected by a much greater margin in the 1987 provincial election.

Hart was appointed Minister of Culture and Communications on August 2, 1989. Prior to that she served her apprenticeship as Parliamentary Assistant to the Minister of Health (Murray Elston, 1986), the Minister of the Environment (Jim Bradley, 1987) and the Treasurer (Robert Nixon, 1988). She resigned on June 4, 1990 over a possible conflict of interest with a telecommunications company that had donated to her election campaign over which her ministry had influence.

The Liberals were defeated by the New Democratic Party in the 1990 provincial election. Hart was defeated by New Democrat candidate Gary Malkowski by 789 votes.

=== Cabinet posts ===
Peterson ministry, Province of Ontario (1985–1990)
Cabinet post (1)
Predecessor	Office	Successor
Lily Munro	Minister of Culture and Communications; 1989–1990	Hugh O'Neil

== Later career ==
Following the 1990 election, Hart continued to practice commercial and regulatory law and became accredited as a mediator (Harvard) and facilitator. In 1994 she was tapped to lead the Ontario Supreme Court's Alternative Dispute Resolution Pilot Project, which successfully provided an alternative to trial-based civil litigation, resolving more than half of the cases sent to it, before examinations for discovery. Hart joined KPMG as a partner in 1996, and in May 1997, she became president of KPMG Conflict Solutions Inc., a company specializing in conflict management services. In 1998 Hart founded Accord/hart & associates inc., a firm offering a comprehensive conflict management services across Canada, and she continues as its president resolving business and governance conflicts.

Throughout her career, Hart has been an author and a teacher. Published works include "Bypass Court: A Dispute Resolution Handbook" with Genevieve Chornenki (5th ed., 2015) and "Freight Claims in Plain English", with Bill Augello (1995). She has taught transportation, regulatory, environmental, ADR, and governance subjects in the Bar Admission Course, for the Law Society, the Ontario Bar Association, and continues to teach new judges how to mediate through the National Judicial Institute.

Hart has actively served as a Director and Governor of a range of not-for-profit organizations for more than 30 years. Her long-standing interest in best governance practices led her to enroll and graduate from (March 2005) the University of Toronto Rotman School of Management's Director's Education Program, becoming an accredited Corporate Director in June 2005. She is currently a member of the boards of the Centre for Addiction and Mental Health (CAMH) and the General Insurance OmbudService. Previous Board experience includes the Greater Toronto Airports Authority (GTAA), Sheridan College, Roots of Empathy, Goodwill Toronto, Kingsway College School, Canadian Stage Company, Canadian Psychiatric Research Foundation, CNIB Library, Leaside Arthritis Society, and the Ontario Bar Association.

From 2011 to 2016, Hart was a Board Member of Goodwill Toronto, until she abruptly resigned along with the rest of the Board.
