= Sir James Whitney School for the Deaf =

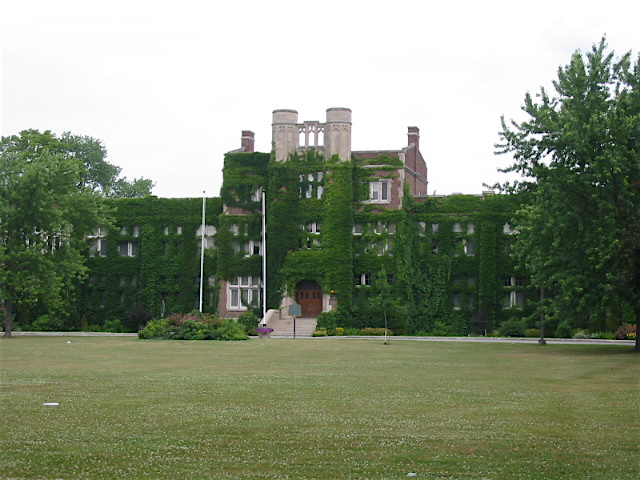

Location
- 350 Dundas Street West; Belleville, Ontario, K8P 1B2; Canada; 44.1506°N 77.4035°W

Information
- School type: Provincial School for the Deaf
- Founded: October 20, 1870
- Superintendent: Linda Wall
- Principal: Arnold Potma (Acting Principal)
- Grades: K-12
- Language: American Sign Language (ASL), English
- Colours: Blue and Yellow
- Mascot: Wolf
- Team name: SJW Wolves
- Website: pdsbnet.ca/en/schools/sir-james-whitney

The Sir James Whitney School for the Deaf is a provincial school in Belleville, Ontario with residential and day programs serving elementary and secondary deaf and hard-of-hearing students.

Along with two (ECD and Robarts School for the Deaf) other provincial schools for the deaf in Ontario, it is operated by the Ministry of Education (Ontario) under Education Act of Ontario section 13 (1).

Teachers are both deaf and hearing.

Deaf student population is approximately 17 students in the senior school and 31 in the elementary school; total is 48 students.

Deaf students from Canada often attend Gallaudet University in Washington D.C. and Rochester Institute of Technology in Rochester, New York for post-secondary programs.

== History ==
This school is named after the former premier of Ontario, James Whitney. When it opened in 1870 it employed Samuel Thomas Greene, the first recognized hearing-impaired teacher of hearing-impaired pupils in Ontario. He was born in 1843 in Portland, Maine and attended America's first Deaf school in Hartford, Connecticut. It has been renamed three times: The Ontario Institution for the Education of the Deaf and Dumb (1870–1912), The Ontario School for the Deaf (1913–1973) and The Sir James Whitney School for the Deaf (since 1974).

The Ontario Heritage Trust erected a plaque for the 'Ontario School for the Deaf' on the grounds of the school, now The Sir James Whitney School, 350 Dundas Street West, Belleville. "The first provincial school for deaf children, this residential institution combined elementary school subjects with vocational training when it opened in 1870. Over the years, ever-increasing enrolment promoted the steady expansion of the school's facilities and curricula."

=== Deaf student population timeline ===
- 1950-1960 - 800
- 1960-1970 - 600
- 1970-1980 - 400
- 1980-1990 - 300-150
- 1990-2000 - 150-120
- 2000-2010 - 120-110
- 2010-2019 - 60 - 45

== Academic approach and languages of instruction ==
The Sir James Whitney School for the Deaf uses a bilingual-bicultural approach to educating deaf and hard-of-hearing students. American Sign Language (ASL) and English are the languages of instruction.

== Gallery ==
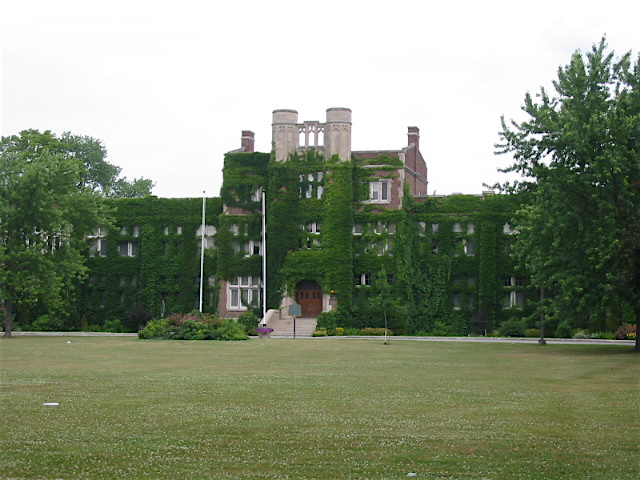
Sir James Whitney School for the Deaf

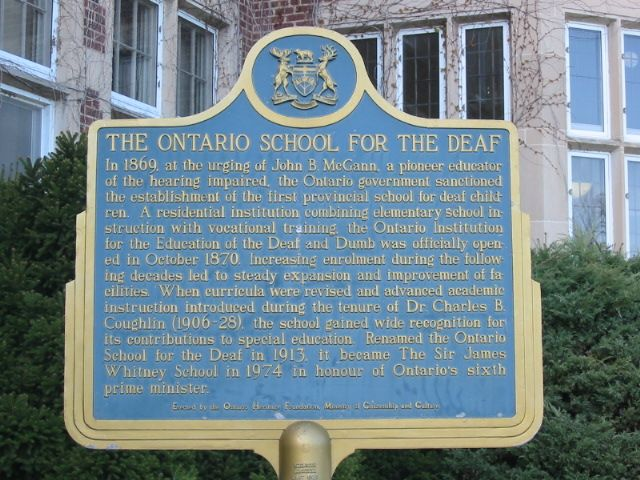
The Ontario Institution for the Education of the Deaf and Dumb (1870 to 1912) - The Ontario School for the Deaf (1913 to 1973) - The Sir James Whitney School for the Deaf (1974 to Now)

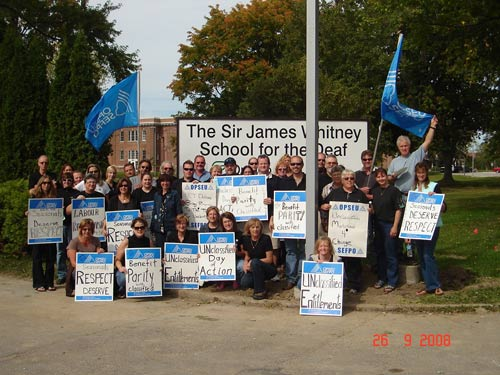
SJW Strike 2008
