= Samuel Thomas Greene =

Deaf educator

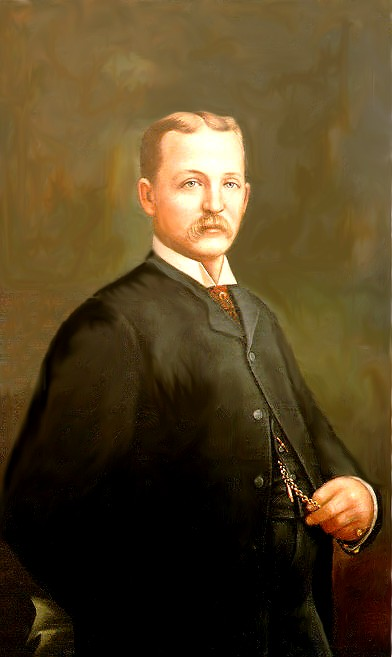
- Painting by Ambrose W. Mason in 1924.
- Born: June 11, 1843; Portland, Maine, US
- Died: February 17, 1890 (aged 46); Belleville, Ontario, Canada
- Education: Gallaudet University
- Occupations: educator, first deaf teacher at the deaf school in Ontario.
- Spouse: Caroline "Cassie" Campbell Howard
- Children: 4
- Parents: Jacob Holt Greene; Sarah W. Frye Greene

Samuel Thomas Greene (June 11, 1843 – February 17, 1890) was a Deaf American educator and Ontario's first Deaf teacher in 1870 at the Ontario Institution for the Education of the Deaf and Dumb, which later changed to Sir James Whitney School of the Deaf in Belleville, Ontario, Canada. He was born in 1843 in Portland, Maine and attended America's first Deaf school in Hartford, Connecticut.

== Biography ==
Samuel Thomas Greene was born on June 11, 1843, in Portland, Maine to hearing parents, Jacob and Sarah Greene. He had four other siblings, one of whom was also Deaf. Greene's parents, Jacob and Sarah, were huge believers of education and religion. Before starting the formal education, Greene began reading and writing at an early age and he also managed to acquire some of American Sign Language (ASL) from his Deaf sister, Sarah Abbott Greene, who attended to the American Asylum for the Education and Instruction of the Deaf and Dumb, currently known as the American School of the Deaf, during that time. Greene eventually began his formal education at the American School of the Deaf on September 18, 1855, and he was taught by one of the most prominent teacher, Laurent Clerc, a French co-founder of the first deaf school in United States in 1817, who dedicated his time in the Deaf Education field for more than fifty years.

After his graduation in 1866, Greene enrolled into National Deaf-Mute College (now Gallaudet University) on September 12, 1866, to pursue a Bachelor of Arts (B.A.) degree. He graduated from Gallaudet University on June 30, 1870, with four other graduates and they were the second congregation to graduate from the university. Greene delivered an oration during his graduation day "The Law of Limitation in National Life". After the graduation, Greene worked at American School of the Deaf as an assistant teacher before he began his journey to Belleville, Ontario to be a teacher at newly opened Sir James Whitney School of the Deaf (formerly Ontario Institution for the Education of the Deaf and Dumb) on October 20, 1870. He is considered Ontario's first Deaf teacher.

Greene married to Caroline Campbell Howard on April 9, 1871. Caroline was a granddaughter of the pioneer Belleville settler, Elijah Wallbridge who settled at Meyer's Creek in 1800, which later became the City of Belleville. The couple has five children, four girls and one boy, and all of them were hearing. Greene and his family embraced bilingualism and biculturalism in their household.

== Deaf Education ==
The Deaf Education in North America in the 1800s was sparse and limited. Greene was taught by several notable Deaf educators when he received his formal education at the American Asylum for the Education and Instruction of the Deaf and Dumb from 1855 to 1866. Because of the formal education, Greene was able to attend the National Deaf-Mute College (Gallaudet University) and receive his college degree.

Greene officially began his career as the first Deaf educator at the Ontario Institution for the Education of the Deaf and Dumb (Sir James Whitney School of the Deaf) on October 20, 1870. He was considered a first-rate teacher and he has his own memoir, The Proper Mode of Teaching New Pupils, where he lists his teaching methods for Deaf children based on his thirteen years of teaching experience. Throughout the memoir, it shows that Greene embraces the bilingual education philosophy and a big believer of connecting with his students to build trust first before he begins his teaching.

The provincial Government wrote a report on Greene's performance in 1877 and an excerpt from the report states that Greene recognizes that Deaf students need a good foundation to build their education. He was a strong believer of bilingual education and using American Sign Language with his students.

== Death ==
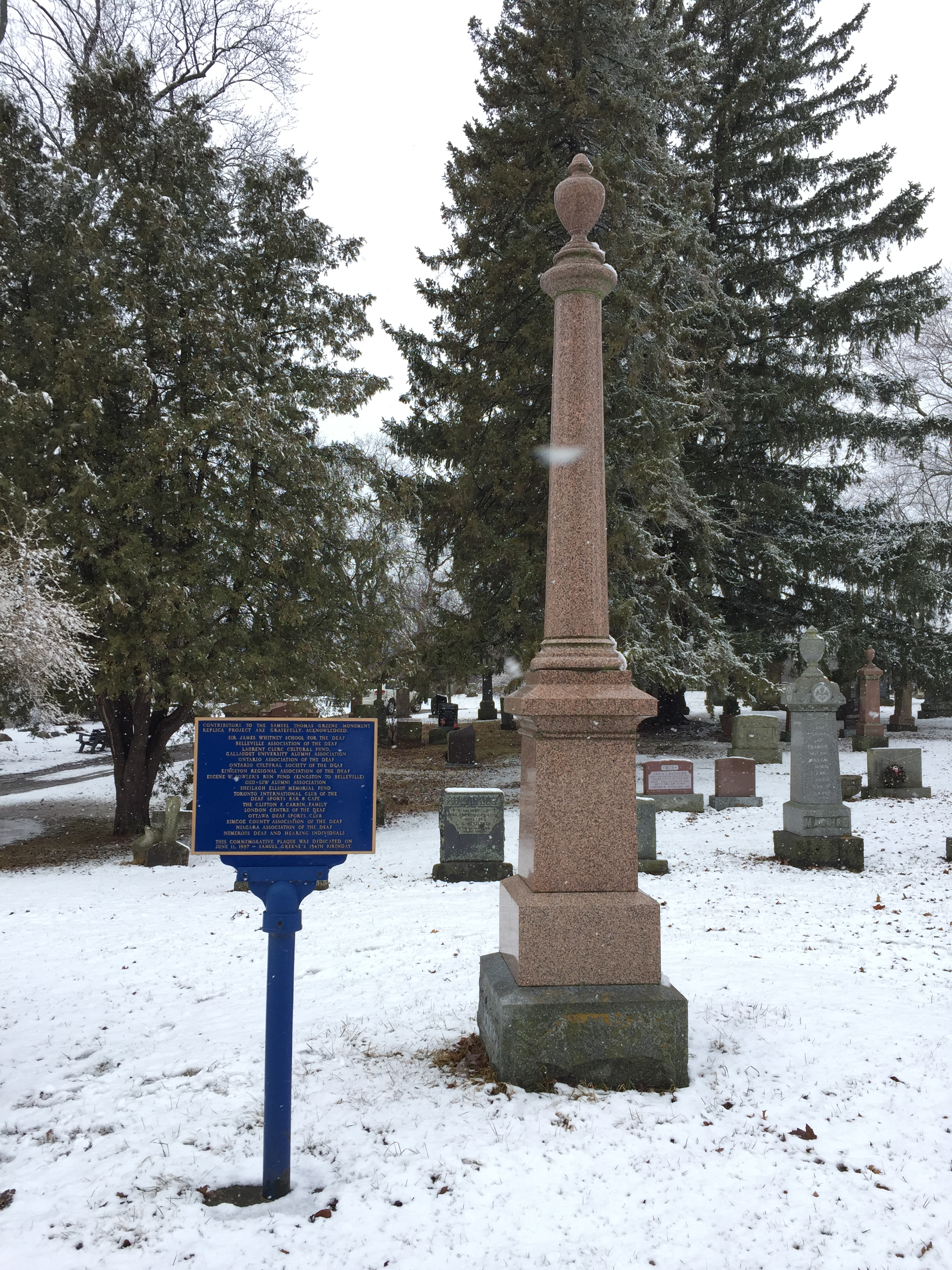
Samuel Thomas Greene's burial monument in Belleville Cemetery.

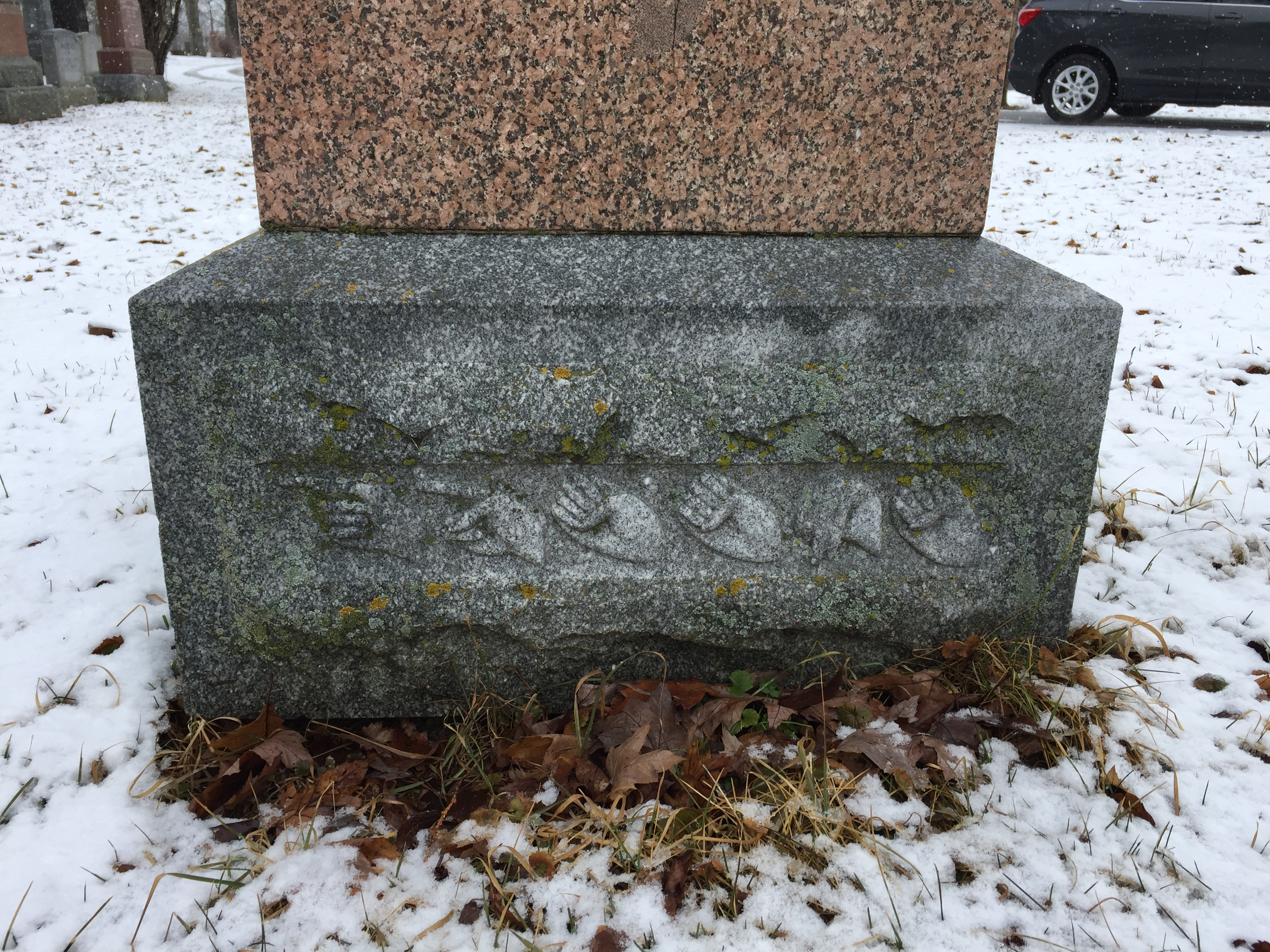
The fingerspelling of his surname, Greene, on the base of his burial monument.

Samuel Thomas Greene died on February 17, 1890, at the age of 46 at his family home in Belleville, Ontario after an ice yachting accident on the Bay of Quinte. The ice yachting was an incredibly popular activity among people of all ages in Belleville during that time. Greene was an avid ice-boating yachtsman and he regularly took his pupils, staff members and friends on many sails on the Bay of Quinte.

Greene and his friends went on a leisure ice yacht trip on the Bay of Quinte on February 3, 1890. Due to the rapid speed and miscommunication, Greene was thrown out from the boat and flew ten feet through the air and hit his head on the ice with a strong force. In the following evening, he fell into unconsciousness and died fourteen days later on February 17, 1890. The news of his death devastated many people in Belleville, especially the staff members and pupils at the Ontario Institution for the Education of the Deaf and Dumb.

The Ontario Institution held the funeral service for him two days later on February 19, 1890, and everyone at the school wore badges to pay their respect for the memory of him. He was buried in Belleville Cemetery. The tombstone was erected in the fall of 1890, and his burial tombstone is widely known among the Deaf and hard of hearing community. Located in the Section P of the Belleville Cemetery, his tombstone has an engraving of his last name "Greene" in manual alphabet of American Sign Language.

== Legacy ==
Samuel Thomas Greene was Ontario's first Deaf teacher and he was described as "a born teacher". Greene was the trailblazer in Deaf Education in Ontario and he is known for his reputation through his Deaf education and leadership efforts in the deaf community. He was one of the founding fathers of the Ontario Deaf-Mute Association in 1886. The name was later changed to Ontario Association of the Deaf (OAD) in 1910.

The Ontario Association of the Deaf, along with Greene's friend and artist Ambrose W. Mason, unveiled and donated a forty-four inches by fifty-four inches portrait of Greene to Sir James Whitney School of the Deaf in July 1924 where the portrait currently hangs at the cafeteria building.

A street in the west end of Belleville was named after Greene in his honor. The Ontario Heritage Foundation unveiled a commemorate plaque to honor Greene's achievements during the 125th anniversary celebration of Sir James Whitney School of the Deaf on July 1, 1995. Greene was mentioned in the City of Belleville's Heritage walking guide in recognition of his work in Deaf Education.

== Sources ==
- Samuel Thomas Greene 1843-1890
