= Connect Society =

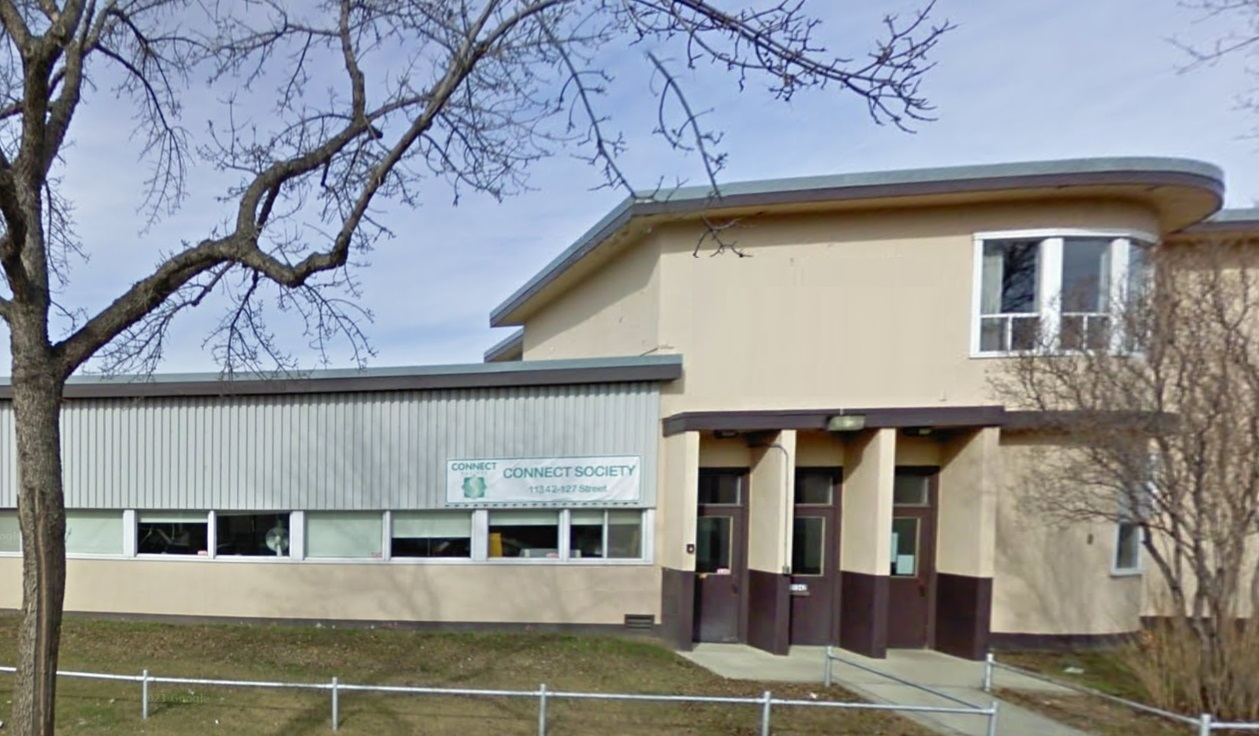
- Connect Society in 2009
- Edmonton, Alberta, Canada

Information
- Established: 1963
- Website: connectsociety.org

Connect Society is a school and a non-profit educational society in Edmonton, Alberta, Canada. Founded in 1963, Connect Society provides services for deaf and hard of hearing individuals, as well as children of deaf adults.

== History ==
Connect Society was founded in 1963 as the Association for the Hearing Handicapped. In 2002, Hilda Marian Campbell wrote that "Edith Preston... worked with the Association for the Hearing Handicapped, now known as the Connect Society, to open the first preschool for Deaf and hard-of-hearing children in the basement of Cross of Christ Church in 1962."

From 1979 until 2010, Connect Society was located at 11342 127 Street in the Northwest Edmonton neighborhood of Inglewood. Since 2010, Connect Society has been located in the Alberta School for the Deaf. Connect Society received a $35,000 grant from Desjardins in 2018.

== Programs ==
Connect Society provides support for Deaf and hard-of-hearing individuals through six different programs: (1) Community Living Support Services, (2) Early Childhood Services, (3) The Early Intervention Program, (4) Family Support Services, (5) The In-Home Sign Communication Program, and (6) The In-Home Sign Communication Program. Community Living Support Services offers residential assistance ranging from occasional help to 24/7 care, with staff trained in American Sign Language, Deaf culture, and assistive technology. Early Childhood Services provides preschool and kindergarten education for children aged 3 to 6, integrating English and ASL to develop language, social, and academic skills. The Early Intervention Program supports children from birth to 3.5 years old who are Deaf, hard of hearing, or have Deaf parents, focusing on communication and cognitive development. Family Support Services helps families affected by hearing loss navigate education, healthcare, and social resources. The In-Home Sign Communication Program provides ASL instruction tailored to each family’s needs. Additional literacy programs support early literacy for children and reading and writing skills for Deaf adults.

== See also ==
- Alberta School for the Deaf
