= Rhode Island School for the Deaf =

American school for deaf children

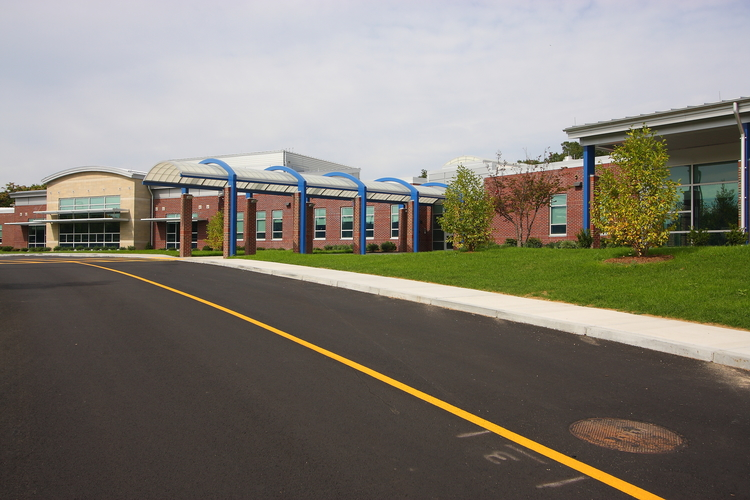

Location
- Providence, Rhode Island; United States; 41.850643°N 71.428070°W

Information
- Established: 1876
- Grades: K–12
- Website: rideaf.ri.gov

Rhode Island School for the Deaf (RISD or RISDeaf) is a school for deaf students established in 1876 in the US state of Rhode Island.

== History ==
=== Founding ===
The school was founded through the initiative of the parents of Jeanie Lippitt, who became deaf at the age of four in 1856 due to scarlet fever. Her mother, Mary Ann Lippitt, taught her to communicate through lip reading and speech.

Jeanie’s father, Henry Lippitt, later became Governor of Rhode Island in 1875. During his time in office, Jeanie frequently visited the Rhode Island State House to advocate before members of the General Assembly for the establishment of a school for deaf children. With the support of her father’s political influence, her efforts were successful, and in 1877 the General Assembly passed legislation establishing a state school for the deaf.

The Rhode Island School for the Deaf continues to operate today.

=== Post-founding ===
Circa 1966, John F. Fogarty, a member of the Rhode Island General Assembly, became involved in a conflict with Governor John Chafee after Fogarty criticized the school’s administration as poorly managed. In response, the State Board of Education commissioned three outside consultants to evaluate the institution. Their report criticized the school’s management and called for restructuring. It also noted that no major refurbishments had been undertaken since 1935 and raised concerns about the condition of the dormitories, though it stopped short of recommending their removal.

=== School name history ===
- 1876–1879: Providence Day School for the Deaf
- 1880–1888: Rhode Island School for the Deaf
- 1889–1892: State School for the Deaf
- 1895–1930: Rhode Island Institute for the Deaf
- 1931–present: Rhode Island School for the Deaf

=== Principals/directors ===
- 1876–1882: Joseph Warren Homer
- 1882–1885: Katherine H. Austin
- 1885–1889: Anna M. Black
- 1889–1906: Laura DeLisle Richards
- 1906–1918: Edwin G. Hurd
- 1918–1932: Anna C. Hurd
- 1932–1966: John Yale Crouter, grandnephew of Caroline Yale
- 1966–2001: Peter M. Blackwell
- 2001–2003: Reginald Redding
- 2003–2007: John F. Plante (interim director)
- 2007–2011: Lori Dunsmore (Director)
- 2012–2023: Nancy Maguire Heath
- 2023–present: Sarah McGaughey

== Campus ==
The main building, constructed in 1892 by Stone, Carpenter & Willson, was demolished. The school's residential dorms were historically located on Hope Street in Providence. This 520 Hope Street original facility for the school was designated to become the new primary home for the Providence Center for Counseling and Psychiatric Services in 1977, which is now The Providence Center, a prominent regional non-profit behavioral health organization. When the school moved to a former state vocational facility in Corliss Park, its residency program ended. In 2010, The school's relocation to Corliss Park was completed, at the cost of $31 million.

== Student body ==
The school takes students from Rhode Island, Connecticut, and Massachusetts. School districts in Rhode Island and southeast Massachusetts refer students to RISD.

== Academics ==
RISD serves deaf and hard of hearing students in grades preschool through high school. RISD believes strongly in students becoming bilingual in ASL and English.

Subjects taught include ASL, math, English, science, and social studies. Work experience programs are provided for high school students.

== Athletics and after-school program ==
=== Cross country ===
Cross country was one of the first varsity sports offered by Rhode Island School for the Deaf (RISD). According to records from Rhode Island Interscholastic League (RIIL), RISD started competing in RIIL and New England meets in 1944.

RISD is one of just three deaf schools to have had a state champion in cross country. This was in 1969. RISD offered cross country until the late 1970s when popularity in the sport started to dwindle and the school then shifted their fall sport offering to soccer for their boys' students.

=== Soccer ===
RISD started fielding a boys' soccer team during the late 1970s and competed in RIIL-sanctioned games as well as New England Schools for the Deaf (NESD) tournaments. RISD won 12 NESD soccer tournaments from 1980 through 2002, and won two International Friendship Tournaments, held at New York State School for the Deaf in Rome, New York.

RISD also had a girls' soccer team from the late 1980s through 2003. The girls' soccer team was very strong during this time, winning seven NESD soccer titles and seven International Friendship soccer tournaments.

Now, RISD fields a coed varsity soccer team during the fall season that competes as an independent school in R.I. Interscholastic competitions and as a full member of Eastern Schools for the Deaf Athletic Association (ESDAA), competing in the annual end-of-season ESDAA Division II 8-man soccer tournaments.

=== Boys' basketball ===
The boys' basketball team won six consecutive NESD boys' basketball championships in the 1970s, and two ESDAA championships. RISD has won 9 ESDAA Division II Boys' Basketball championships. To date, RISD has had 21 boy students who recorded over 1,000 points during their varsity basketball career, and three students who scored over 2,000 points

RISD was one of the founding member of the Coastal Prep League, a private school boys' basketball athletic conference, and won the first three conference championships from 1992 to 1994. RISD won one more CPL championship in 2009, before leaving the league starting in 2017–18.

RISD continues to field a varsity boys' basketball team that competes as an independent school in R.I. Interscholastic competitions and as a full member of ESDAA, competing in the annual end-of-season ESDAA Division II tournaments.

=== Girls' basketball ===
RISD started to field a girls' basketball team in the mid-1970s, and success followed shortly, winning four NESD girls' basketball tournaments from 1979 to 1982. RISD's girls' basketball team has won 12 ESDAA Division II girls' basketball tournaments from 1979 through 2007. To date, RISD has had 8 girl students who recorded over 1,000 points during their varsity basketball career, and one who scored over 2,000 points.

RISD continues to field a varsity girls' basketball team that competes as an independent school in R.I. Interscholastic competitions and as a full member of ESDAA, competing in the annual end-of-season ESDAA Division II tournaments.

=== Track and field ===
RISD has a long history in track and field. Three of its boy students earned RIIL state titles, and three hold standing ESDAA Boys' Track & Field records. The school team has twice finished second in the ESDA Track & Field Championships.

RISD girls' track & field team has had a number of excellent individual performers. Their best finish as a team in ESDAA Track & Field Championships was 3rd place, accomplished seven times. RISD has also sent a number of students to the Deaflympics, the Olympic competition for athletes who are deaf and/or hard-of-hearing, in the sport of girls basketball and track and field.

=== Other sports ===
==== Past ====
In the past RISD offered football to their boys for three seasons during the 1930s, and field hockey and softball to their girls for several seasons during the late 1970s and early 1980s.

RISD fielded cheerleading teams from 1970 through 2003. RISD's cheerleading teams won two NESD championships as well as six ESDAA cheerleading competitions.

RISD offers varsity teams in soccer, basketball, and track & field, as well as youth and middle school soccer and basketball programs.

RISD also offers Unified Volleyball and Unified Basketball. In 2026, RISD’s Unified Basketball team won the Special Olympics Rhode Island Interscholastic League (RIIL) Division VI Championship.

==== Present ====
Among the activities offered as part of the after-school program are: Academic Bowl, LEGO Robotics, Battle of the Books, Art Club, Student Body Government, Girl Scouts, the Rochester Institute of Technology Middle School Math Team Competition, yearbook committee, displaying artwork at local art shows, and joining Shakespeare in the City and JR. NAD.
