= Robarts School for the Deaf =

Location
- 1515 Cheapside Street; London, Ontario, N5V 3N9; Canada; 43.01250°N 81.20874°W

Information
- School type: Provincial School for the Deaf
- Founded: 1973
- Principal: Chris Jaramillo
- Grades: K-12
- Language: American Sign Language (ASL); English
- Website: asl.pdsbnet.ca/schools/robarts-school-for-the-deaf

The Robarts School for the Deaf is a provincial school in London, Ontario, with residential and day programs serving elementary and secondary deaf and hard-of-hearing students.

Along with three (ECD and SJW) other provincial schools for the deaf in Ontario, it is operated by the Ministry of Education (Ontario) under Education Act of Ontario section 13 (1).

Teachers, support staff, and administrative staff at the school are Deaf, hard of hearing, and hearing.

Deaf student population approximately 25 students in the senior school and 40 students in the elementary school, total is 65 students.

Deaf students from Canada often attend Gallaudet University in Washington, D.C., and Rochester Institute of Technology in Rochester, New York for post-secondary programs.

== History ==
Deaf population with English speaking was boom, 800 deaf kids in 1950s and 1,200 deaf kids in 1960s then Ontario government decided to opened 3rd deaf school in London, Ontario.

=== Deaf student population timeline ===
- 1973-1985 – 200
- 1985-1995 – 150
- 1995-2005 – 100
- 2005-2019 – 80–65

== Academic approach and languages of instruction ==
The Robarts School for the Deaf uses a bilingual-bicultural approach to educating deaf and hard-of-hearing students. American Sign Language (ASL) and English are the languages of instruction.
