= Ernest C. Drury School for the Deaf =

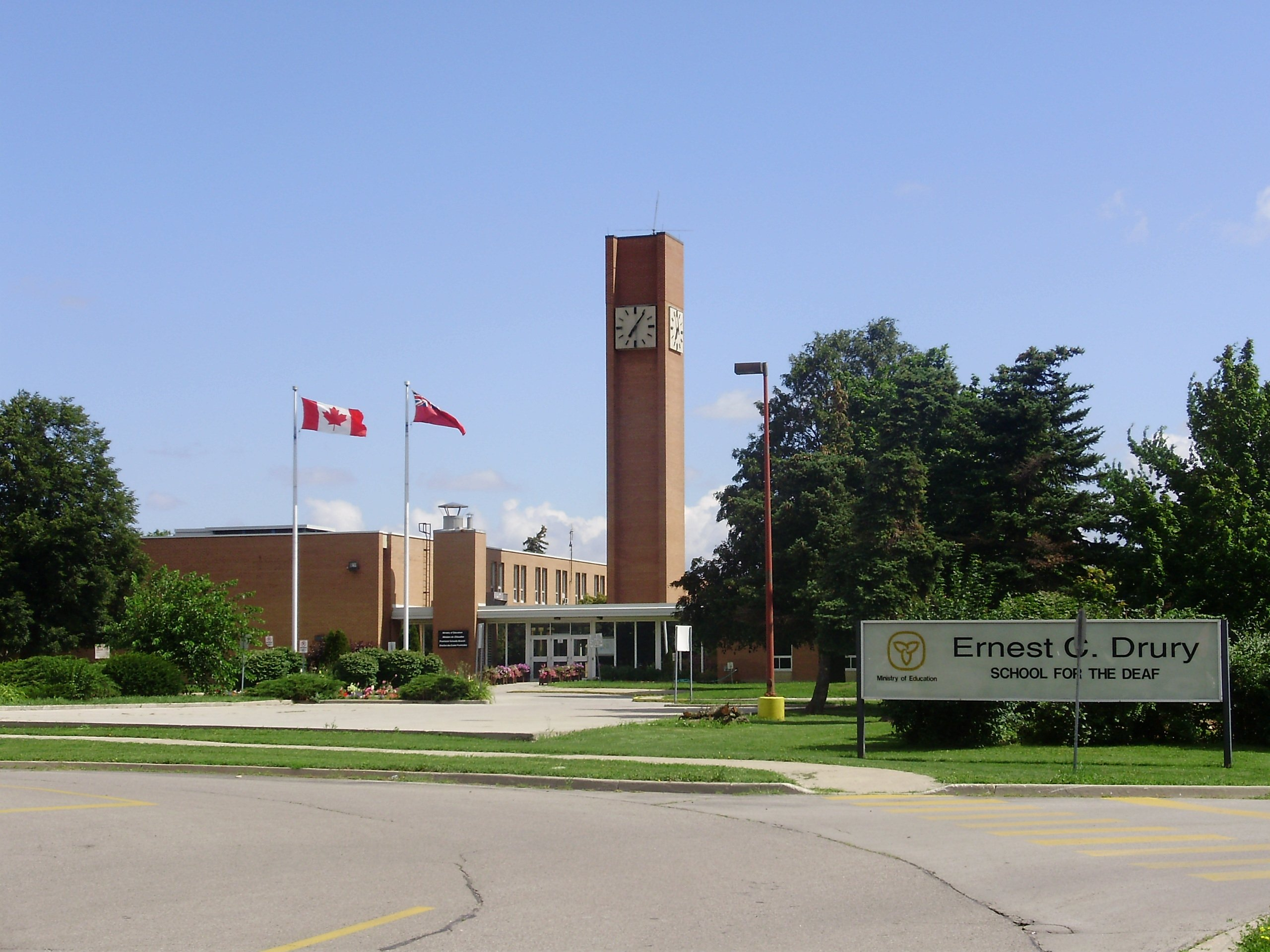

Location
- 225 Ontario Street South; Milton, Ontario, L9T 2M5; Canada
- Coordinates: 43.5141°N 79.8696°W

Information
- School type: Provincial School for the Deaf
- Motto: 'Together We Succeed'
- Founded: April 21, 1963
- Grades: K-12
- Language: American Sign Language (ASL), English
- Colours: Green and yellow
- Mascot: Spartan (High School) and Beaver (Elementary)
- Team name: ECD Spartans and ECD Beaver
- Website: pdsbnet.ca/en/schools/ernest-c-drury/

The Ernest C. Drury School for the Deaf is a provincial school in Milton, Ontario, Canada with residential and day programs serving elementary and secondary deaf and hard-of-hearing students.

Along with three (SJW and Robarts School for the Deaf) other provincial schools for the deaf in Ontario, it is operated by the Ministry of Education under Education Act of Ontario section 13 (1).

Teachers are both deaf and hearing.

Deaf student population is approximately 90 students in the senior school and 100 in the elementary school; total is 190 students.

Deaf students from Canada often attend Gallaudet University in Washington D.C., and Rochester Institute of Technology in Rochester, New York for post-secondary programs.

== History ==
Before 1963, land was farm.

This school is named after the former premier of Ontario, Ernest C. Drury. It has been renamed two times: The Ontario School for the Deaf (1963–1973) and The Ernest C. Drury School for the Deaf (since 1974).

=== Deaf student population timeline ===
- 1963–1973 – 600
- 1973–1980 – 400–350
- 1980–2000 – 350–250
- 2000–2015 – 250–200
- 2015–2019 – 200–190

== Academic approach and languages of instruction ==
The Ernest C. Drury School for the Deaf uses a bilingual-bicultural approach to educating deaf and hard-of-hearing students. American Sign Language (ASL) and English are the languages of instruction.

== Notable alumni ==
- Gary Malkowski, former Member of Provincial Parliament (MPP) and Parliamentary Assistant to the Minister of Citizenship.
- Anthony Natale, a prominent figure in the world of Deaf media and a distinguished performer in film, television, and theater.
- Amanda Richer, an award-winning actress and director. She was Sally Hawkins American Sign Language coach on the Best Picture Oscar winning film, The Shape of Water.

== Gallery ==
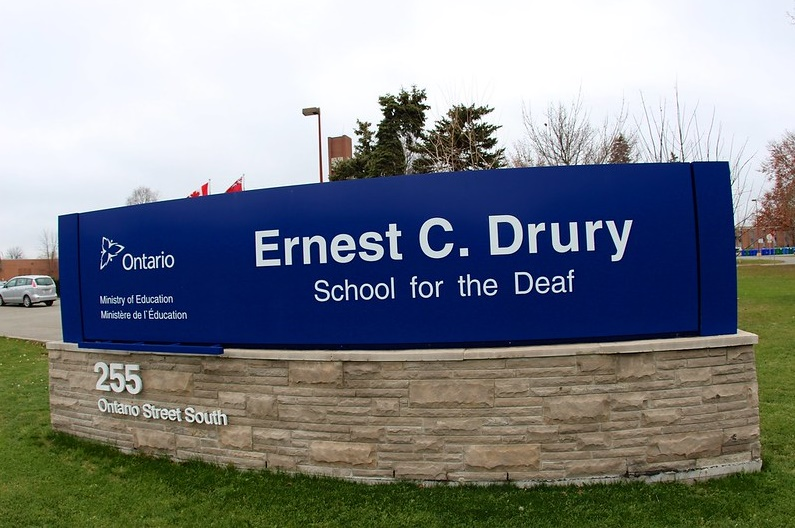
New sign on December 1, 2015
