= Gary Malkowski =

Canadian politician

Ontario MPP
- In office 1990–1995
- Preceded by: Christine Hart
- Succeeded by: John Parker
- Constituency: York East

Personal details
- Born: July 26, 1958 (age 67) Hamilton, Ontario
- Party: New Democrat
- Website: www.garymalkowski.ca

Gary Malkowski (born July 26, 1958) is a former Canadian provincial politician. He represented the riding of York East in the Legislative Assembly of Ontario from 1990 to 1995, as a member of the Ontario New Democratic Party (NDP). He was Canada's first deaf parliamentarian, and the first deaf parliamentarian in the world to address a legislature in a sign language, specifically American Sign Language. He was formerly a table tennis player who went onto represent Canada at the Deaflympics in 1977 and 1985.

== Background ==
Born in Hamilton, Ontario, Malkowski went to E. C. Drury School for the Deaf, in Milton, Ontario. He was further educated at Gallaudet University in Washington, D.C., receiving a Bachelor of Arts degree in psychology and social work, and a Master of Arts degree in rehabilitation counselling. He was cited in Who's Who in American Universities and Colleges for his work in advancing student rights.

After graduating, he worked as a vocational rehabilitation counsellor and deaf culture instructor for the Canadian Hearing Society, and taught continuing education courses in politics and culture for deaf adults at George Brown College. In 1989, he was presented with a Community Action Award by the Ontario government. On May 13, 2011, he received an honorary Doctor of Humane Letters degree from Gallaudet University; he also delivered the commencement address that day.

== Politics ==
The NDP won a majority government in the 1990 provincial election, and Malkowski defeated Liberal incumbent Christine Hart by 789 votes in the Toronto area riding of York East. When Bob Rae's government took office following the election, the very first law passed was to permit Malkowski's sign language interpreters to stand on the floor of the legislature. Malkowski was named parliamentary assistant to Elaine Ziemba, Minister of Citizenship on October 1, 1990. Ziemba was also the minister responsible for human rights, the disabled, seniors and race relations.

In 1993, Malkowski became parliamentary assistant to the Minister of Education and Training. In 1994, he introduced the Rae government's Ontarians with Disabilities bill, which aimed to improve service accessibility for people with disabilities. Although the bill did not pass, it helped form the basis for the Accessibility for Ontarians with Disabilities Act which was passed in 2005.

In the 1995 election, the governing NDP were reduced to 17 seats, and Malkowski lost to Progressive Conservative John Parker by 3,263 votes.

== After politics ==
He is now a special advisor to the president of the Canadian Hearing Society. In this role, Malkowski opposed disabilities legislation proposed by the Mike Harris government in 1998 as ineffective.

In 2004, Malkowski began a campaign to have major theatre companies install closed-captioning services for deaf patrons. This led to a human rights complaint which was resolved in 2007 when then major theatre companies agreed to install the deaf patron services in their theatres.

In 2026, Malkowski endorsed Avi Lewis in that year's federal NDP leadership race.

== Memoirs ==
Author Richard Medugno has published a biography, Deaf Politician: The Gary Malkowski Story and a play, Bigger Dreams, about Malkowski.
