= Fukui Prefectural School for the Deaf =

- 福井県立ろう学校

Location
- Japan
- Coordinates: 36.069085°N 136.19607°E

Information
- Information: 0776-24-5190
- Prefecture: Fukui
- City: Fukui
- Neighborhood, etc.: 2-22 Ikuhisa-chō
- Postal Code: 910−0014
- (in Japanese): 福井県福井市幾久町2-22
- Website: Fukui Prefectural School for the Deaf

Fukui Prefectural School for the Deaf (福井県立ろう学校, Fukui-kenritsu-rō-gakkō) is a school for the deaf located in Fukui, Fukui Prefecture, Japan. The school educates children in regular school subjects from infant age through high school.
