= Nottinghamshire Deaf Society =

Coordinates: 52.9627°N 1.1630°W

Nottinghamshire Deaf Society main building

Nottinghamshire Deaf Society is based at a Victorian building on Forest Road West in Nottingham. The original charity was founded in 1890. It is a Grade II listed building and was built in the 1860s, when it was the home of the Nottingham Congregational Institute.
