= Metro Deaf School =

K–12 school in Minnesota, United States

Coordinates: 44.9721°N 93.1473°W

Metro Deaf School (MDS) is a birth–12+ free charter school in St. Paul, Minnesota, that serves Deaf, Hard of Hearing, and DeafBlind students throughout the Twin Cities. Its mission is to promote academic excellence and social wellbeing for Deaf, DeafBlind and Hard-of-Hearing students using an ASL/English bilingual approach.

== History ==
In 1992 the school was established as Minnesota began allowing charter schools. It was the second charter school to open in Minnesota and it was the first-ever charter school in that state which catered to a disability. The Forest Lake School District initially chartered MDS. Previously the only public option catering to deaf children was the state-operated boarding school Minnesota State Academy for the Deaf (MSAD) in Faribault; Minneapolis area deaf parents wanted a closer option so they would not have to travel to MSAD.

The school began classes in September 1993; initially it was a K–8 school.

Minnesota North Star Academy (MNSA), a charter high school for the deaf merged into Metro Deaf on July 1, 2009. MNSA opened in 2003; previously most deaf high school students in the Minneapolis area either attended local high schools with deaf interpreters or boarded at MSAD. Initially the merged school was called Metro Deaf School-Minnesota North Star Academy (MDS-MNSA) but it became Metro Deaf School in 2010.

== Curriculum ==
In 2015, the school began hosting a "Confucius Classroom", a program for teaching students Chinese language and culture. The St. Cloud State University Confucius Institute established the program, which involves teaching Chinese Sign Language.

Metro Deaf School has also established connections with a Deaf school in the Philippines.

== Activities ==
Academic Bowl

Basketball

Battle of the Books

Cheerleading

Cross Country running

Flag Football

Softball

Student Life after school program

Soccer

Swimming

Theater

Track and Field

Volleyball
