= Examination support document =

An examination support document (ESD) was a submission formerly proposed to be required to be made to the United States Patent and Trademark Office by an applicant for a United States patent under certain circumstances. An ESD would be required to comprise at least:

- A statement that a prior art search was done including the fields of search and search logic;
- A listing of the references deemed most closely related to the claims pending in the patent application;
- An identification in each reference of all of the limitations in each claim found in said reference.
- A detailed explanation pointing out how each independent claim is allowable over the prior art; and
- A showing of where each limitation in each claim is found in the specification the patent application.

As of November 1, 2007, examination support documents were to be required for each patent application that had more than 5 independent claims or more than 25 dependent claims that had not had a first office action on the merits of its claims.

Examination support documents were controversial. Many US patent agents or attorneys felt that they would force an inventor to, in essence, examine his or her own application. Others felt that they would help speed up patent examination and improve patent quality.

The requirement never came into effect because of a preliminary injunction and was abolished effective October 14, 2009.
