= Beverly School for the Deaf =

The Children's Center for Communication/Beverly School for the Deaf
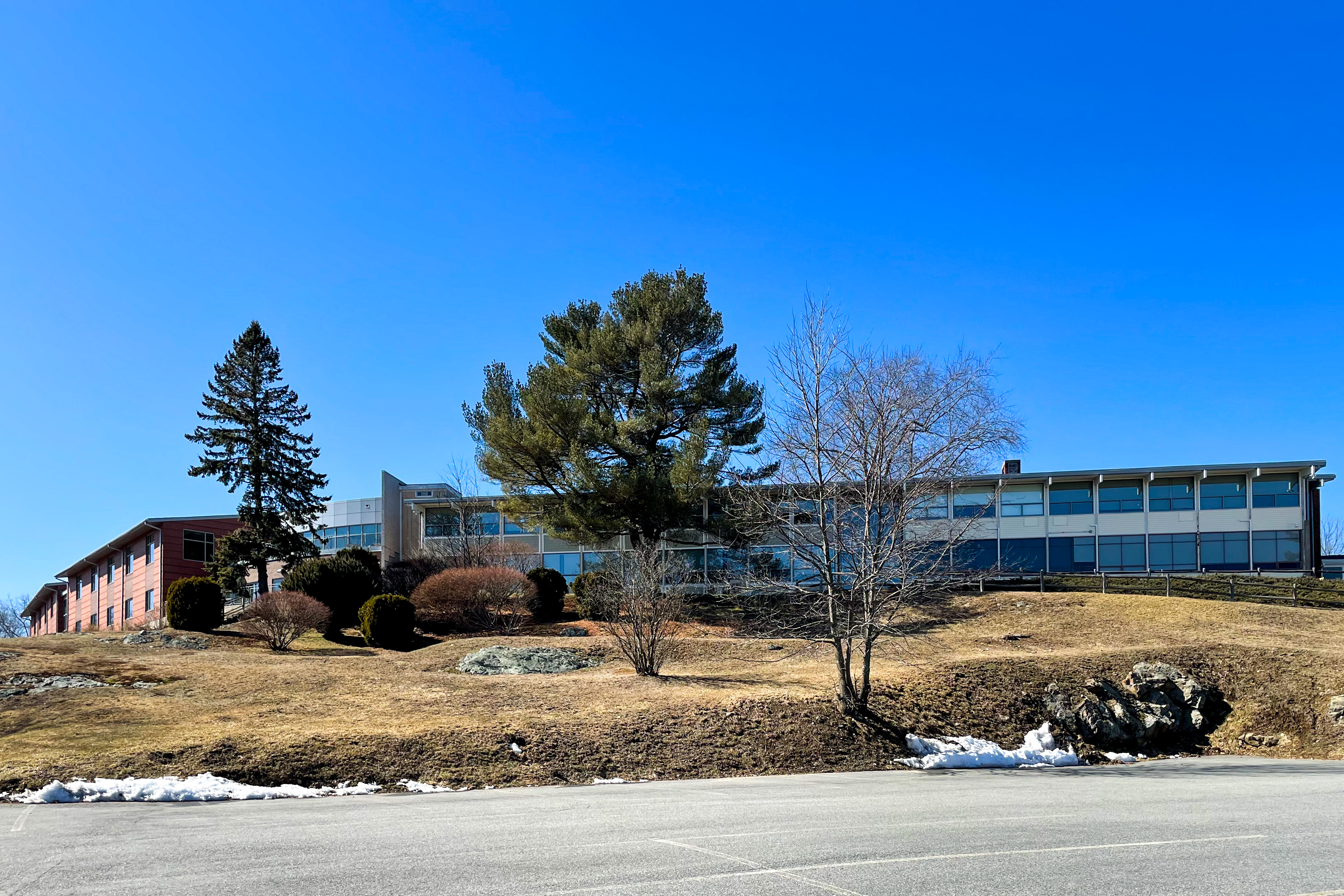

Location
- 6 Echo Avenue; Beverly, Massachusetts 01915; United States; 42°33′23″N 70°53′32″W

Information
- Type: Private Special Needs School & Non-Profit Organization
- Established: 1876
- Founder: William B. Swett
- Executive Director: Dr. Karen Hopkins
- Age range: 0-22
- Enrollment: 250+
- Mascot: Bobcat
- Website: www.cccbsd.org

The Children's Center for Communication/Beverly School for the Deaf (CCCBSD) is a school, established in 1876, for students from birth to age twenty-two who are Deaf, Hard-of-Hearing, or hearing with complex communication needs by providing language that is visually accessible via American Sign Language, written English, speech, and AAC/Assistive Technology.

== History ==
CCCBSD was founded in 1876 by William Benjamin Swett in Beverly, Massachusetts. Mr. Swett was a deaf man with a deaf daughter and saw a need for educational and vocational services for deaf children and young adults of Boston's North Shore. In 1879 with a small legacy and the help of his close friend, the Reverend Dr. Thomas Gallaudet, a 57-acre (230,000 m^{2}) parcel of land was purchased overlooking the tidal waters of the Bass River in Beverly.

The school was initially run by the Swett family with Mr. Swett as the Superintendent, and Mrs. Swett as the Matron and 30 students.. Their two daughters, Nellie and Lucy, became teachers and John Bowden, their son-in-law, became the foreman of the Industrial Department. The original name was "The New England Industrial School for the Education and Instruction of Deaf Mutes", usually referred to as the New England Industrial School for Deaf Mutes. Students were taught to talk and taught lip reading, the recommended method of teaching deaf children at the time. They also learned trades such as farming, chair-caning, carpentry, and homemaking. The school's name changed in 1922 from the New England Industrial School for Deaf Mutes to Beverly School for the Deaf and was registered as non-profit.

In the 1970s the school expanded to teach children who have learning and developmental disabilities. In 2004, services were extended to students with autism, developmental delays and other disabilities and communication challenges. In 2007, the school transitioned from its 15-year use of Signed Exact English (SEEII) to American Sign Language (ASL), and the name was officially changed to The Children's Center for Communication with Beverly School for the Deaf.

== Campus ==
The school currently resides on a seven-acre campus with 43,000 square feet of academic space. There are over 20 classrooms, each of which contains an electronic whiteboard and assistive technology devices. There is also a computer learning center, two OT/PT rooms, a music room, two vocational rooms, a life skills center, a student library and an art room. The campus also features a fully accessible playground, a baseball field, two nursing stations, laundry rooms, a full kitchen, a dining hall, conference rooms and a full gymnasium.

== Community ==
CCCBSD offers numerous programs to the public, such as American Sign Language (ASL) classes, a baby sign group, a toddler sign group, a preschool sign group, and children's sign classes. CCCBSD also offers community outreach services, consultation, outreach to schools, and interpreting.
