= Educational service district =

Educational service district may refer to:

- Education service district (Oregon)
- Educational service district (Washington)
