= Alberta School for the Deaf =

K-12 school in Edmonton, Alberta (est. 1956)

Location
- 6240 113 Street NW; Edmonton, Alberta; Canada; 53.500°N 113.524°W

Information
- School type: Provincial School for the Deaf
- Founded: 1956
- School board: Edmonton Public Schools
- Area trustee: Michael Janz
- Principal: Sandra Mason
- Grades: 1–12
- Enrollment: 100 (2021–21)
- Language: American Sign Language (ASL), English
- Website: asd.epsb.ca

The Alberta School for the Deaf is a provincial school in Edmonton, Alberta with elementary and secondary residential and day programs serving deaf and hard-of-hearing students.

Teachers are both deaf and hearing. Alberta School for the Deaf is modeled on a bilingual-bicultural approach. The total enrollment, including the elementary school, is 100 as of 2020–21. Students from across Alberta and the Northwest Territories attend the school.

Deaf students from Canada often attend Gallaudet University in Washington D.C. for post-secondary programs.

In 2010, the Connect Society relocated its school and outreach programs to the Alberta School for the Deaf.
