= Summit Speech School =

School in New Jersey, United States

Coordinates: 40.69726°N 74.41373°W

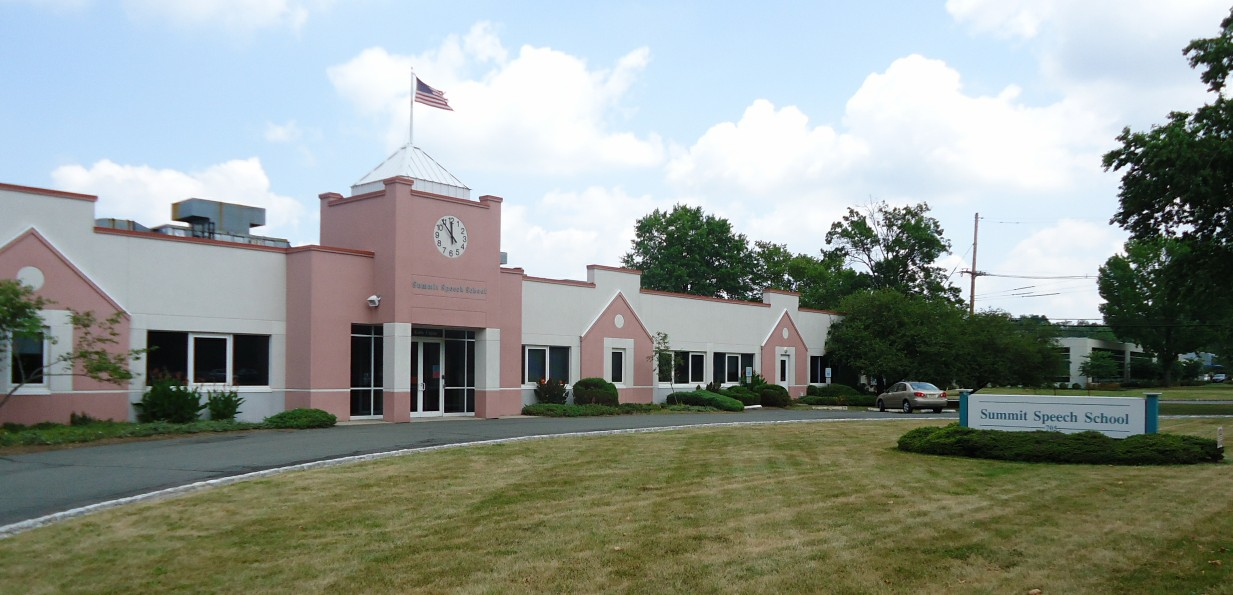
- New Providence, NJ, USA

Information
- Established: 1967
- Principal: Howard Helfman
- Staff: 50
- Enrollment: 130; 180; 200; (estimates vary)
- Website: www.summitspeech.org

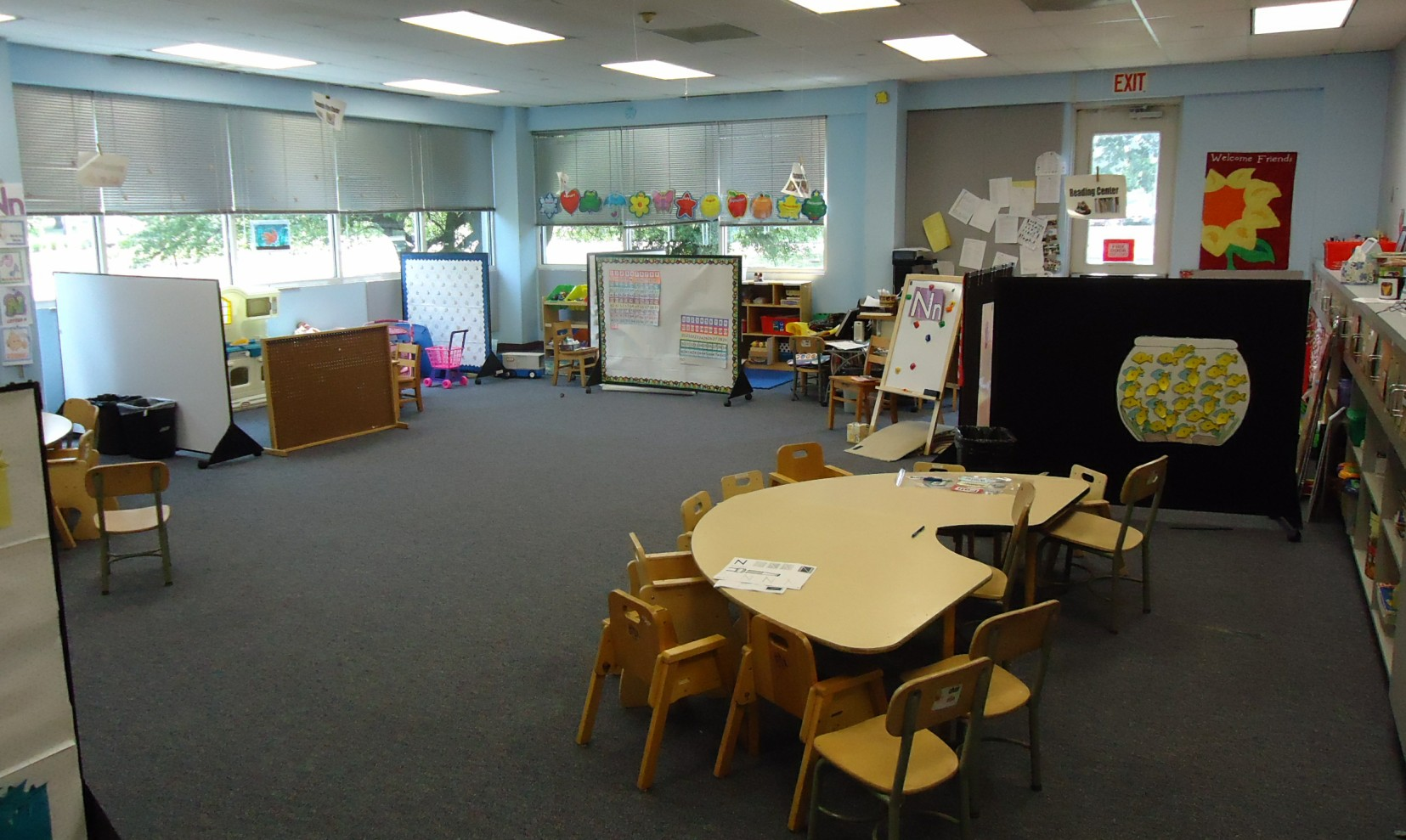
The building was converted from industrial space and has high ceilings, wide corridors and a spacious environment.

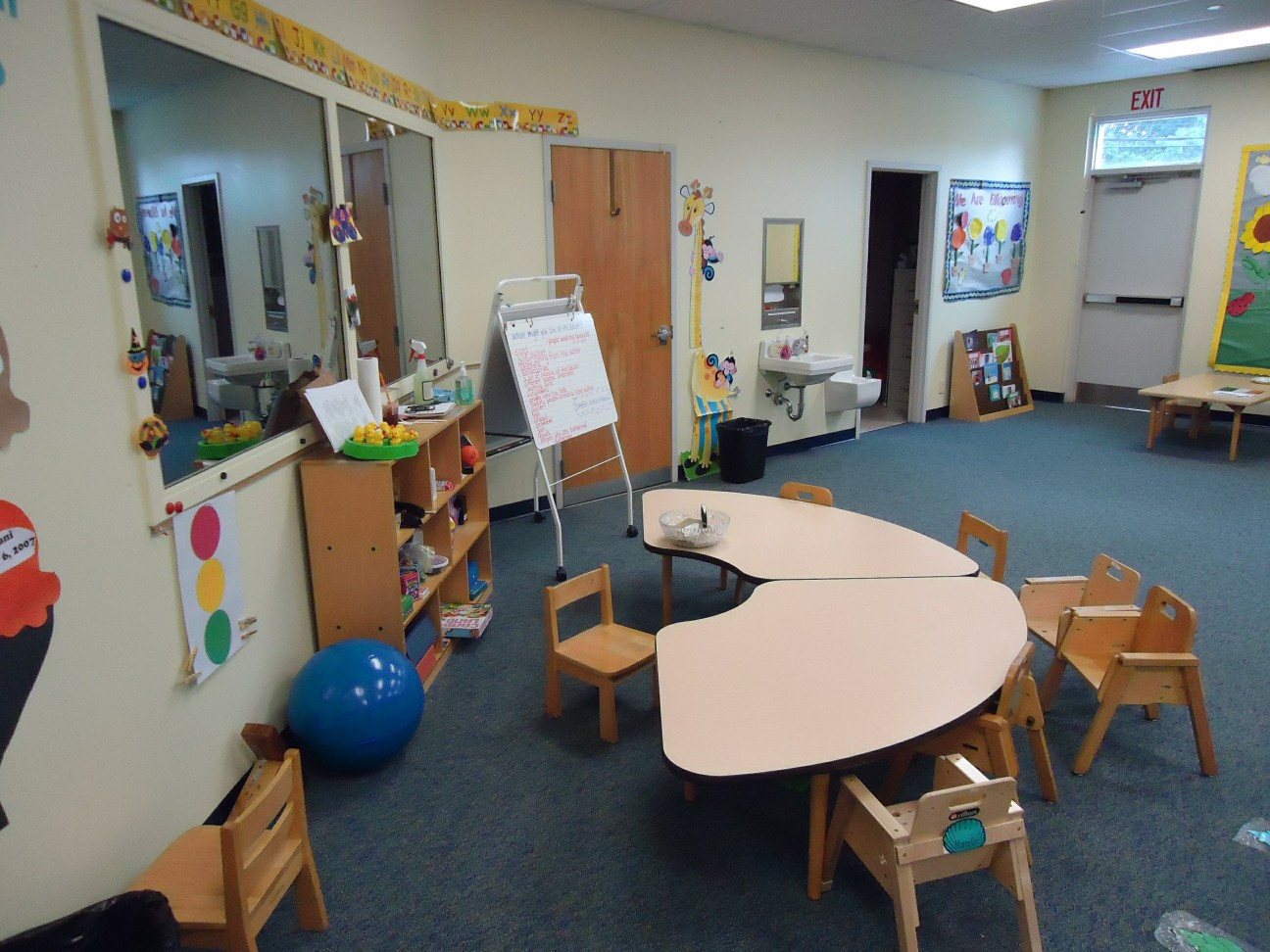
The open half-donut seating arrangement improves chances for communication between a teacher and several students.

The Summit Speech School is a year-round educational institution based in New Providence, Union County, New Jersey, United States, which assists children in northern and central New Jersey who have difficulty hearing. The school uses an approach which has been described variously as an oral-option or auditory-oral or auditory-aural method, in the sense that the program helps children "to listen and talk without the use of sign language". The school receives funding from various sources, including the Junior League of Summit and the State of New Jersey. It hosts benefits to raise funds. According to a report in 2010, fund-raising is on-going and ranges from $800,000 to $1 million a year. It has been assisted in the past by volunteers. An introduction to music had been provided by renowned educator Capitola Dickerson for thirty years.

== History ==
The Summit Speech School was formed in 1967 with assistance from the Junior League and with efforts by volunteers such as Diane Hunt Lawrence. The first building was located near Overlook Hospital. In the 1980s, pediatrician Arthur F. Ackerman was president. The school moved to its present facility in New Providence in 1997 into a former warehouse. Since 1997, according to one report, the building has been owned by the borough of New Providence. In 2009, New Jersey passed Grace's Law, which requires health insurers to pay up to $1,000 per ear for hearing aids for children younger than fifteen years old, and the law was named for a former deaf student of the Summit Speech School named Grace. In 2009, volunteers including Betse Gump helped set up libraries for the children at the school. In 2010, the school was visited by Mary Pat Christie, the First Lady of New Jersey and wife of Governor Chris Christie.

== Programs ==
Most children served by the school have severe hearing loss, which can hamper their ability to comprehend speech in any environment with substantial background noise. Director Pamela Paskowitz said that the school tries to help particularly young children by teaching them to speak "clearly and often" and to use devices such as cochlear implants. According to a previous director:

The natural reaction of a parent hearing that the child is deaf is to stop talking to the baby, and that's the very worst thing they can do. At that point they need to just pour language into that child. But they need somebody to help them realize that the child must wear his hearing aids or he's not getting any of the language that they're putting into him.

— Ann Buckley, Summit Speech School, 1992

The school offers several programs which vary based on the age of the child:

1. Parent-infant program to help parents of children under age three.
2. Classroom instruction for children from ages three to six years old which alternates between "small group language lessons and large group activities".
3. For older children, teachers of the deaf work with students and classroom teachers at approximately forty New Jersey schools.
