= Willie Ross School for the Deaf =

Coordinates: 42°01′52.80″N 72°34′39.43″W

- Longmeadow, Massachusetts

Information
- Established: 1967
- Head of school: [Mr. Robert Carter, President & CEO]
- Website: Willie Ross School for the Deaf's website

Willie Ross School for the Deaf is a school for the deaf and hard-of-hearing located in Longmeadow, Massachusetts. The school was founded in 1967.
