= Marie Jean Philip =

Leader in deaf community

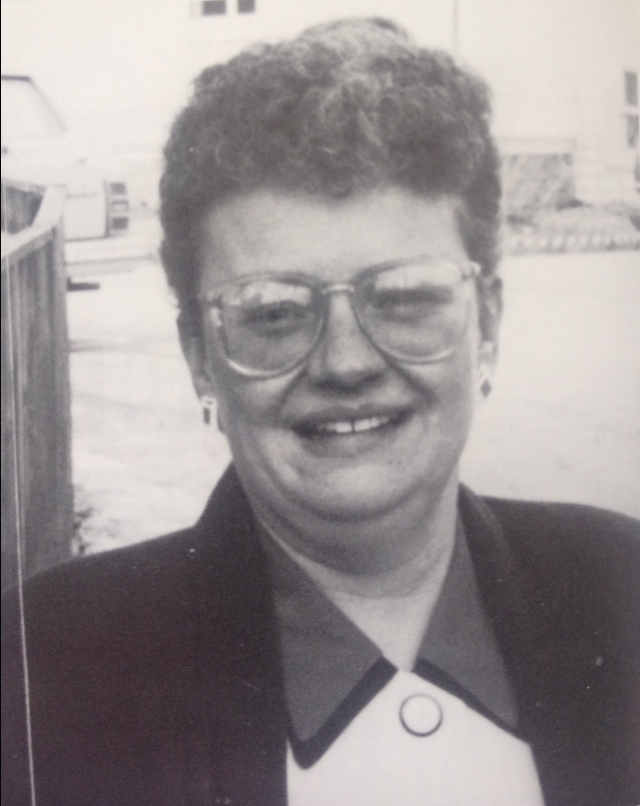
- Marie Philip in 1993
- Born: April 20, 1953; Worcester, Massachusetts, US
- Died: September 24, 1997 (aged 44); Jamaica Plain, Massachusetts, US
- Other name: Marie Philip
- Education: Northeastern University (Linguistics)
- Occupations: Bilingual-Bicultural Coordinator, ASL teacher/researcher
- Known for: Sign language and Deaf Culture advocacy

Marie Jean Philip (April 20, 1953 – September 24, 1997) was a leader in both the American and international Deaf community. She advocated for the right to a natural sign language for Deaf people. Marie was one of the original researchers studying ASL and Deaf Culture. She was active in establishing American Sign Language (ASL) as a recognized language in the colleges of Massachusetts in the early 1980s. Later, Marie was the Bilingual-Bicultural Coordinator at The Learning Center for the Deaf in Framingham, Massachusetts.

== Early life and education ==
Marie Jean Philip was born on April 20, 1953, at Worcester, Massachusetts. She was the daughter of two deaf parents, John and Doris Philip. When they realized Marie was deaf, they sent her to Clarke School for the Deaf, but she was rejected by the program because she signed. Her parents then sent her to the American School for the Deaf, where she flourished.

Marie was the oldest of three, her two sisters Sue and Joan were also deaf and both attended the American School for the Deaf with her. She was very close to her family and the Deaf Community in Worcester, MA. After graduating at American School for the Deaf (ASD), Marie attended Gallaudet University in 1969. Her junior year, she decided she wanted to try an exchange program with Oberlin, a hearing school. She received a lot of criticism from her peers, who did not understand why she would want to attend a hearing school. Her response was that she grew up in a deaf world, and wanted to see what things were like for the hearing. Once she got there, she interacted with hearing people who were just learning to sign, which changed her view on hearing people. When she returned for senior year, she realized she did not want to be a Psychologist any longer, as it was too emotionally draining for her.

She took a break from college. Marie moved to Florida to find a job during her break from college. After five months, her parents told her to come back home, where she fortunately found a job as an ASL research assistant at Northeastern University which sparked her crusade as an advocate for ASL as a real language. She then went back to school at Northeastern University to receive her Bachelor of Science degree in Linguistics and minor in Cultural Anthropology. Marie was pursuing her goal of a master's degree in Deaf Education, leading to a PhD, at Boston University, when she died.

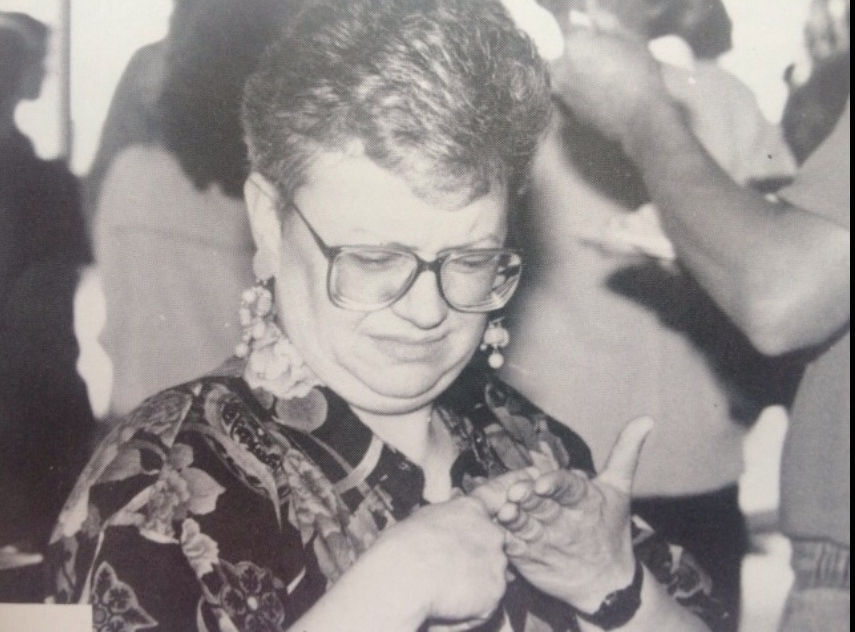
Marie Jean Philip in the 1990s

== Career ==
=== Northeastern University ===
In 1974, Marie moved to Florida to find a job during her break from college. She worked at a McDonald's, cleaned hotels, and delivered newspapers to make money. After five months, her parents told her to come back home to Massachusetts. Fortunately, Harlan Lane offered her a job as an ASL research assistant at Northeastern University which sparked her crusade to advocate for ASL as a real language. Marie Philip worked at Northeastern from 1974 to 1987 as an ASL researcher/teacher and later became the Coordinator of Interpreter Services at the university The Learning Center for Deaf Children contacted Marie and wondered if she would be willing to go to their school and try a Bilingual-Bicultural approach with the young deaf children. Marie took a leave of absence from Northeastern University in 1985. Later, Marie left Northeastern University & became the full-time Bilingual-Bicultural Coordinator at The Learning Center for the Deaf (TLC) in 1987.

=== Bilingual-Bicultural Movement ===
Philip was a pioneer in the Bilingual-Bicultural (Bi-Bi) movement. She took a job with The Learning Center for Deaf Children in Framingham in 1985, moving up to the position of Bilingual Bicultural Coordinator in 1987.

=== Leadership ===
Philip traveled to many countries during her career, including Canada, El Salvador, England, France, Italy, and Japan. She also took on many speaking engagements due to her research and experience. Marie was influential in establishing the Massachusetts Commission for the Deaf and Hard of Hearing in 1985." Marie was also taught ASL at Harvard University before funding money ran out and the program was deleted. Marie never wanted to be famous, and although she had an international reputation, she never forgot her roots. She felt most comfortable at the Worcester Deaf Club chatting with the 'real' people, as she would refer to her friends and neighbors.

Philip also worked as a freelance interpreter in settings that ranged from local to international.

=== Storyteller ===
While at The Learning Center, Philip developed a reputation as the children's favorite storyteller. Her facial expressions and language skills filled stories with excitement, laughter, terror, and happiness. The staff loved to watch her stories, too. Her niece Jessica and nephew Jonah were especially fortunate, as they enjoyed her storytelling both at home and at school.

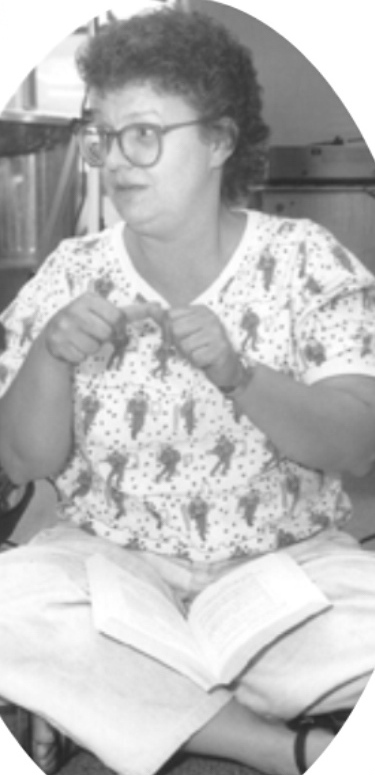
Marie Jean Philip telling ASL stories in the late 1980s

== Death ==
Marie Philip died on September 24, 1997, of a pulmonary embolism.

== Legacy ==
Northeastern University created the National Marie Jean Philip ASL Poetry, ASL Storytelling and Deaf Art Competition in 1997.

In May 2002, The Learning Center named their new elementary school the Marie Jean Philip Elementary Building; in 2015, they named their PreK-12th grade program the Marie Philip School.

"Marie was one of the most instrumental deaf people in the world," said Michael Bello, executive director of the Learning Center for Deaf Children in Framingham, a school where Philip pioneered many programs.

== Memorials ==
- Marie Philip School
- National Marie Jean Philip ASL Poetry, ASL Storytelling and Deaf Art competition, at Northeastern University
- Marie Philip Award, Registry of Interpreters for the Deaf
- Marie Jean Philip Elementary School Building

== Publications ==
- Hand Book: American Sign Language: 1 (1980)
- Sign Language Research and Linguistic Universals (1976)
- Supplementary Materials for American Sign Language II (1978)
- Bilingual Bicultural program development at the Learning Center for Deaf Children
- "Cross-Cultural Comparisons: American Deaf culture & American Majority Culture" Videotape (1993)
