= Boston School for the Deaf =

Former school for the Deaf in Randolph, Massachusetts, United States

Location
- 800 North Main Street; Randolph, Massachusetts
- Coordinates: 42.18095°N 71.05388°W

Information
- Established: 1899
- Closed: 1994
- Grades: Pre-K–12
- Color(s): Blue and Yellow
- Mascot: Hawks

The Boston School for the Deaf was a school located in Randolph, Massachusetts and operated by the Congregation of the Sisters of St. Joseph. The school educated generations of deaf students.

== History ==
The school was founded in 1899 in Jamaica Plain. In 1904, the school moved to Randolph. By 1907, the school served around 100 students.

At peak enrollment, the school served 300 students.

Beginning in 1989, the school leased space to Elian's, a high school program for international students from Spain.

The school closed in 1994, citing low enrollment and financial issues; at the time of its closure, the school served only 67 students. The school's campus was bought by the Boston Higashi School in 1998.

== Education ==
The school was an "innovator" in Deaf education. In line with other deaf schools run by the Sisters of Saint Joseph, the Boston School focused on teaching deaf children to speak and to lip read, rather than to communicate via sign language.

The school also collaborated with Randolph Public Schools, creating both a joint drama program and a program which allowed Deaf students to attend classes at Randolph High School.

The school offered an athletics program, and by 1907 had a girls' basketball team. The school joined the New England Schools for the Deaf Athletic Association in 1963. Later in the 1960s, the school's boys' basketball team won the association's basketball championship.

== Legacy ==
In 2004, nine former students of the school filed a lawsuit against the school, alleging that they had been subject to sexual and physical abuse at the institution between 1944 and 1977. The suit named 14 nuns, a priest, a male athletic instructor, and an official in the Boston Archdiocese. A total of 18 lawsuits were eventually filed by individual former students.
