= Bilingual–bicultural education =

Deaf education programs that use sign language as the native language

Bilingual–Bicultural or Bi-Bi deaf education programs use sign language as the native, or first language, to teach Deaf children. For example, in the United States Bi-Bi proponents state that American Sign Language (ASL) should be the natural first language for deaf children, although the majority of deaf and hard of hearing children are born to hearing parents. In this same vein, within Bi-Bi educational programs the spoken or written language used by the majority of the population is viewed as a secondary language to be acquired either after or at the same time as the native language. It is vital for Deaf children to learn to sign American Sign Language (ASL) from an early age. As without it, Deaf children can encounter a deep-rooted language and cognitive deficit.

In Bi-Bi education, a signed language is the primary method of instruction. Once sign language is established as the individual's first language and they have acquired sufficient proficiency, a second language—such as English—can then be effectively taught using the first language as a foundation. Early exposure to ASL has been proven by researchers to improve, not only academic success but English proficiency, and thought process enhancement as well. The bicultural aspect of Bi-Bi education emphasizes Deaf culture based on the idea that language is tied to ones identity and ethnic pride, thus needed to strive in that culture. In addition, Deaf individuals are not only people with disabilities but rather a linguistic minority, as well as a culture. Therefore, Bi-Bi education helps individuals with inclusion, identity, and obtainability. In comparison, language and academic success is not assurance for deaf students depending solely on oral-only methods.

== Usage Worldwide ==
Within the US, 36% to 40% of residential and day schools for deaf students report using Bi-Bi education programs. A notable example of schools utilizing the Bi-Bi method in the US include The Learning Center for the Deaf in Massachusetts and Gallaudet University.

Sweden and Denmark are two countries known for their bilingual–bicultural education of deaf children. Sweden passed a law in 1981 that mandated bilingualism as a goal of deaf education. Denmark recognized sign language as an equal language and espoused sign language as the primary method of instruction in schools for the deaf in 1991.

== Bilingual-Bicultural Movement ==
Bilingual–bicultural education is based on Cummins' Model of Linguistic Interdependence. In 1976, James Cummins predicted that proficiency in a first language would correlate to competence in a second language because a single cognitive process underlies language acquisition for both languages. After decades of using the oral method of education, some advocates sought a new method for teaching deaf students.

Marie Jean Philip was a pioneer in the Bilingual-Bicultural (Bi-Bi) movement. In 1985, The Learning Center for the Deaf in Framingham, Massachusetts, was able to convince Philip to begin a new career as Special Assistant to the Director for Implementation of Bilingual/Bicultural Policies. After two years, Philip agreed to take on the full-time position of Bilingual Bicultural Coordinator, which she held from 1988. Philip led the school into the Bi-Bi education system.

The Learning Center for the Deaf became the first Deaf school in the United States to officially adopt a Bilingual-Bicultural teaching philosophy. Schools in California, Indiana, and Maryland soon followed by officially adopting Bilingual-Bicultural teaching philosophies. Many schools then began to use systems of Manually Coded English (MCE) in an attempt to develop English in deaf students. After the perceived failure of Manually Coded English systems, some educators began using the bilingual–bicultural model.

On September 24, 2018, Carey M. Ballard published a thirty-minute documentary film, Bilingual-Bicultural Movement at The Learning Center for the Deaf, which examines the history of the movement.

== Bi-Bi Approaches to Learning ==
A majority of deaf children are born from hearing parents. This can result in deaf children not becoming proficient in either English or Sign Language by the time they enter school age. There is ongoing debate within the Deaf community about the best way to teach Deaf students in the U.S. Some believe a new written system for ASL should be created (see "Writing" section in American Sign Language), while others prefer using ASL Gloss, MCE, or not having a written ASL system at all.

An example of a Bi-Bi teaching strategy is one that focuses on Deaf Children learning ASL and English simultaneously, with English being introduced through ASL Gloss readings. These readings slowly shift to the morpho-syntactic structure of English, allowing deaf students to become more familiar with English vocabulary and grammar. This method aims to ensure that deaf students are competent in both ASL and English literacy.

The National Association of the Deaf lays out several suggested steps on how to plan and implement a Bicultural education program, including steps such as hiring staff who are proficient in both sign language and the common second language of the region, defining when and how each language should be used, and creating a space that represent the values and beliefs of both Deaf and Hearing communities.

== Research on Socio-emotional Impact ==
Research has shown links between sociocultural factors and students' educational success. Learning in their first language allows students to feel a sense of belonging, leading to their academic success, including development in their two languages. The bilingual teaching approach creates meaningful academic experiences for students when cultural factors are recognized. The cultural aspect of the bicultural bilingual approach enhances deaf students' experiences success in school. The school climate in a bicultural-bilingual setting gives students the opportunity to foster their academic, cognitive and socio-cultural skills in two languages.

Various studies have found a correlation between ASL skill level and English literacy or reading comprehension. The most plausible explanation for this is that ASL skill level predicts English literacy level. Having a basis of American Sign Language can benefit the acquisition of the English language. In fact, bilingual children show more development in cognitive, linguistic, and meta-linguistic processes than their monolingual peers.

Lev Vygotsky, a former Soviet psychologist renowned for his study on social cognitive development, argued that the quality and quantity of children's play is contingent upon the language shared among children. Piaget, another psychologist renowned for his child development study, and Vygotsky agreed that language plays a significant role in cognitive and social development, because language competence significantly shapes play behaviors. When deaf children are in a Bi-Bi setting where they have access to language and the full ability to communicate with their peers, they can develop linguistic, social, and cognitive skills.

A study on deaf children and theory of mind (ToM), which is the ability to put oneself in someone else's shoes, showed no differences in performance in theory of mind tasks between deaf children of deaf parents and their hearing peers. Deaf children with hearing parents however, whether they were educated using spoken English or ASL, showed delays in two ToM tasks, false beliefs and knowledge states. A potential reason for such delays could be due to the lack of accessibility to conversations for deaf children in their environment, opportunities for incidental learning, and the difficulty in communicating about daily routines. This can create challenges in discussing thoughts, beliefs and intentions among deaf children lacking language.

Deaf children use sign language to express themselves, discuss events, ask questions, and refer to things in their environment, just as hearing children use spoken language. The human brain is naturally wired to crave information and constant access to communication, and social settings with accessible language provide that. The earlier that Deaf children have the chance to naturally acquire sign language with constant language input, the better their cognitive and social skills, because they are able to receive information about actions, objects, experiences, and events in time.

== See also ==
- Co-enrollment
