= Christian School and Chapel for the Deaf =

School in Luquillo, Puerto Rico

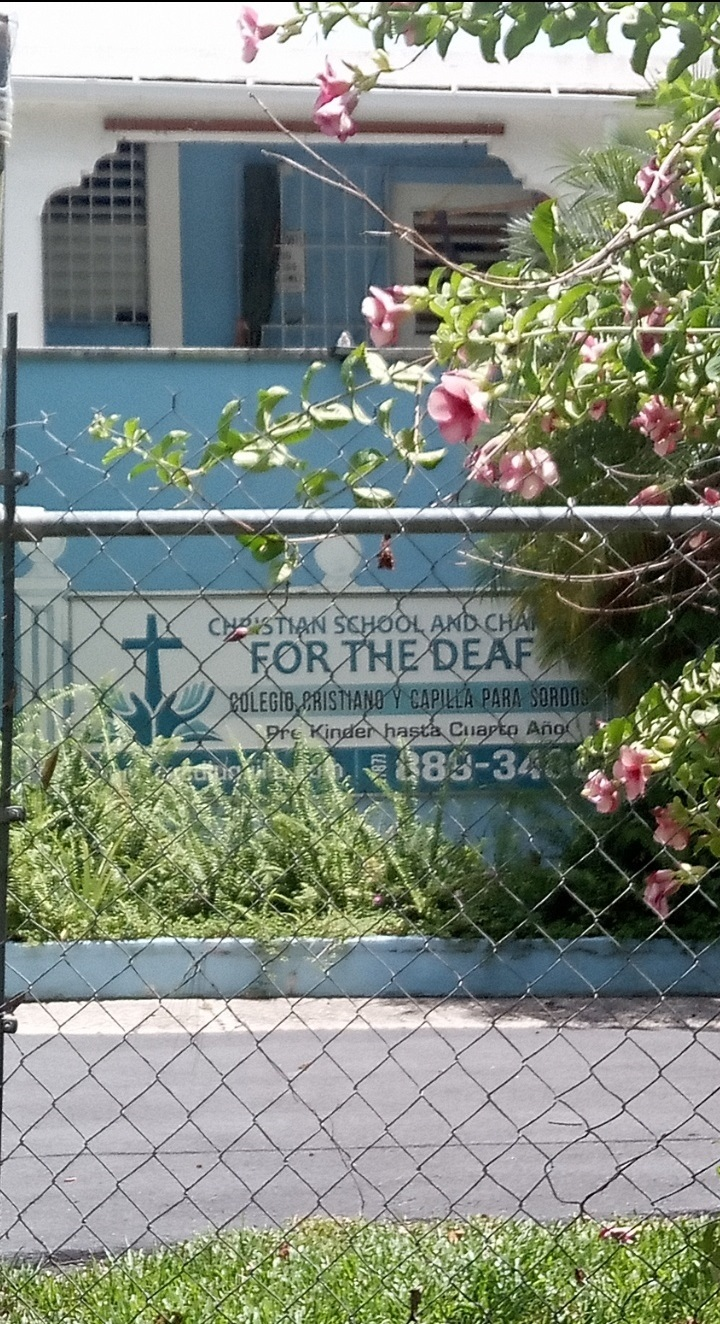

Location
- Luquillo, Puerto Rico 00773-9602
- Coordinates: 18.34923°N 65.71164°W

Information
- Established: 1959
- Head of school: Elisabeth Hoke
- Languages: American Sign Language (ASL), Puerto Rican Sign Language (PRSL), signed English, and Pidgin signed English (PSE)
- Website: cscdluquillo.com

The Christian School and Chapel for the Deaf (CSC; Spanish: Colegio Cristiano y Capilla para Sordos) is a school located in Luquillo, Puerto Rico. It was named the Evangelical School for the Deaf (ESD) until its name change in 2011.

== History ==
The Christian School and Chapel for the Deaf is a private Christian school for deaf children founded by missionaries in 1959. The school was originally known as Evangelical Mission to the Deaf and for a time was under the mission board United Mission Fellowship. In 1971, the ministry settled on the current name. ESD is under the administration of the World Mission to the Deaf, a Canadian organization that channels resources to the school and provides counsel. In 2011, the school was reincorporated as Christian School and Chapel for the Deaf, Inc. as the board and staff began to envision more outreach and an enlarged vision to include adult ministries.

ESD opened its doors to a class of five students (three boys, two girls) in September 1960.

== School directors ==
School directors at ESD have traditionally assumed a multi-faceted role. In addition to administrative and supervisory duties, directors have often taught academic and technical classes, ran ministries outside of the school, taught religious classes at local churches, and even served as pastors.

- Gene Orcutt served as the school director from 1959 until the 1970s.
- Roger Rawlings served as school director from 1970 to 1989. While serving at ESD, Roger and his wife Pamela continued a church for the deaf in San Juan. In 1985, the church bought a building in Hato Rey and began the Evangelical Church and Center for the Deaf.
- Pam Mobray served until 1998.
- Elisabeth Hoke began working at ESD in 1984 after graduating from Penn State University with a B.S. in deaf education. In 1989, Hoke returned to college and graduated with a M.S. in deaf education from Western Maryland College in 1991. She took over the position in 1998 and is now working as an administrator and as a teacher.

== Educational philosophy ==
The Christian School and Chapel for the Deaf uses the Total Communication (TC) approach to provide academic instruction. Under this philosophy, teachers use whatever means of communication is most readily understood by the student to provide him/her with an appropriate and stimulating level of academic instruction.

== Sign language at ESD ==
The kind of sign language used at the school varies due to the diverse population of students and staff. The types of sign language includes the following: American Sign Language (ASL), Puerto Rican Sign Language (PRSL), signed English, and pidgin signed English (PSE), known as contact signing. This is not a definitive list as research in the field of sign language linguistics is constantly making new discoveries and these categories of language frequently overlap.

== Handbell choir ==
Since 2002, the school handbell choir has been performing in venues around Puerto Rico. Initially conceived and directed by Marisol Matos, the bell choir has grown in popularity and skill. The students are directed using sign language instead of audible cues and rely on sheet music to know when to play their parts.

The handbell choir has performed at the Puerto Rican Senate and many local churches and universities.

The school director, Elisabeth Hoke, directs the choir.

== See also ==
- Deafness
- Education in Puerto Rico
- American Sign Language
- Deaf Culture
