= Arizona State Schools for the Deaf and Blind =

School in Arizona, United States

Arizona State Schools for the Deaf and the Blind
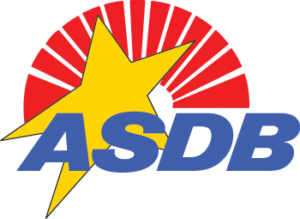
- State of Arizona Agency

Information
- School type: Deaf, Blind, and Visually Impaired School
- Motto: Excellence and Innovation for Today and the Future
- Founded: 1912
- Sister school: Phoenix Day School for the Deaf Arizona School for the Deaf – Tucson Arizona School for the Blind – Tucson
- Superintendent: Annette Reichman

The Arizona State Schools for the Deaf and the Blind (ASDB) is a state-operated institution for educational purposes in Arizona that provides specialized educational services to students who are blind, visually impaired, deaf, hard of hearing or deafblind, with its administrative headquarters in Tucson.

ASDB serves students from birth through age 21 and operates both campus-based schools and statewide outreach programs. The agency functions independently of local school districts and is governed by a state-appointed board. By law, the campus-based schools cannot not duplicate existing services found in other local school districts.

== Early origins (Pre-1912) ==
- 1895: Even before Arizona became a state, the Territorial Legislature passed a law to provide education for children who were deaf or blind—a precursor to ASDB.

== 1912 – Founding and Statehood ==
- 1912: The first Arizona state legislature enacted a provision establishing the Arizona School for the Deaf and the Blind in the same year Arizona became a state.
- First Principal: Henry C. White was appointed by Governor George W. P. Hunt.
- Opening: Classes began in October 1912 with 19 children who were deaf or hard of hearing. Initially, classes were held in a converted residence on the University of Arizona campus in Tucson.

== 1920s – Campus move and expansion ==
- 1918–1919: The City of Tucson donated land, and additional acreage was purchased as enrollment grew.
- 1921: Construction contracts were awarded for key facilities including dormitories, a kitchen/dining hall, and engine powerhouse.
- 1922: The school relocated to its West Speedway campus, where classes began that fall.

== 1929 – Legal Establishment ==
- 1929: The Arizona State School for the Deaf and Blind was formally created by state law (Laws 1929, Chapter 93), making it an independent state agency separate from the University of Arizona.
- A governing board of directors was established, with appointees including the governor (ex-officio) and others to oversee operations.

== 1960s – Expansion to Phoenix ==
- 1967: In response to demand for local services, the Phoenix Day School for the Deaf (PDSD) was established as a branch campus to serve students in the Phoenix area.
- PDSD offered education from preschool through 12th grade, with extensive support services.

== 1970s – Early childhood services ==
- 1973: ASDB launched statewide early childhood programs to serve infants and toddlers who were deaf, hard of hearing, blind, or visually impaired, often in homes and natural environments.

== 1980s–1990s – Legislative reform and renaming ==
- 1987: Major legislative updates addressed education of children with disabilities and ASDB oversight issues, mandating improvements and audits of the agency.
- 1993: The agency's name was changed to the Arizona State Schools for the Deaf and the Blind, reflecting expansion in scope and services.
- The 1993 law also lowered the minimum age for student eligibility to 3 years, expanded agency responsibilities, and reaffirmed its mission.

== 2000s – Governance and funding updates ==
- 2001: ASDB became a beneficiary of funding from Arizona's Classroom Site Fund, aimed at strengthening teacher compensation.
- 2005: The number of board members increased to ten, broadening governance representation.

== 2010s – Leadership and landmark recognition ==
- 2016: ASDB Superintendent Annette Reichman was selected as the first superintendent who is both deaf and visually impaired in the school's history—an important milestone in representation.
- 2016–2017: Two original campus buildings from the 1920s were officially designated as Arizona Historic Landmarks, affirming ASDB's century-long historical significance.

== Present sructure and ervices (2020s) ==
Today, ASDB is a state-operated institution for educational purposes serving more than 2,000 children from birth to grade 12 who are deaf, hard of hearing, blind, visually impaired, or deafblind. Approximately 16% of the students are at the two campus locations, with the rest being served in an itinerant setting.

2021–2022 Laws: Legislative updates designated ASDB day schools as limited local education agencies for accountability and clarified admissions and evaluation procedures. The legislative intent clause added recognizing that ASDB was in the middle of work on a strategic plan. Once that strategic plan was completed, the legislature was to readdress what was in the best interest of the students and align actions with the school's purpose and strategic plan. As of 2026, this has not been readdressed.

In January 2026, the Arizona State Schools for the Deaf and the Blind announced plans to relocate its Tucson campus after more than a century at its original location. Faced with declining enrollment, reduced funding, and high operational costs, the agency approved a five-year lease agreement with the Amphitheater School District to move the Tucson campus to the former Copper Creek Elementary School in Oro Valley. Staff and students are expected to relocate during the summer of 2026, with classes beginning at the new site in the fall semester.

== Campuses ==
It operates three schools for the deaf and blind, and regional cooperatives throughout the state:

- Phoenix Day School for the Deaf-Phoenix Campus (PDSD)
- Arizona School for the Deaf-Tucson Campus (ASD)
- Arizona School for the Blind-Tucson Campus (ASB)
- Regional Cooperatives: These regional cooperatives are voluntary partnerships between public education agencies (school districts and charter schools) throughout the state and ASDB. School staff and the Cooperative staff work together in local schools to promote success for students who are deaf, hard of hearing, blind or visually impaired.

== Controversies ==
=== Facility conditions and safety concerns (Phoenix Day School for the Deaf) ===
In the mid-2010s, the Phoenix Day School for the Deaf (PDSD), operated by the Arizona State Schools for the Deaf and the Blind (ASDB), was the subject of media scrutiny regarding aging and deteriorating facilities. Reports cited termite damage, mold odors, failing air-conditioning systems, and concerns about potential asbestos exposure, particularly in preschool buildings. The condition of the facilities raised questions about student health and safety, as well as delays in state funding for replacement or renovation of the campus.

=== Budget shortfalls and program cuts ===
In 2025, ASDB experienced a significant budget shortfall estimated at $2.6 million. The deficit led to reductions in staffing, program cuts, and limitations on extracurricular and student support services. Parents and advocates expressed concern that the funding challenges would negatively affect educational quality and services for deaf, hard of hearing, blind, and low-vision students across Arizona.

=== Legislative reauthorization disputes ===
During the 2023 Arizona legislative session, ASDB became the focus of debate over its statutory reauthorization. Competing bills proposed different lengths of continuation, ranging from a short-term two-year extension with increased oversight to a longer multi-year authorization. The stalled legislative process and disagreements between lawmakers prompted concern from parents, alumni, and disability advocates about institutional stability and long-term planning for the school.

=== IDEA compliance and corrective action ===
In 2024, Disability Rights Arizona filed a formal administrative complaint alleging that ASDB violated the Individuals with Disabilities Education Act (IDEA) by failing to provide required services outlined in students’ Individualized Education Programs (IEPs), including American Sign Language interpretation and related therapies. The Arizona Department of Education investigated the complaint and determined that ASDB was out of compliance, ordering corrective actions and systemic reforms to address service delivery and procedural safeguards.

=== Historical governance and audit findings ===
ASDB has periodically been reviewed by the Arizona Auditor General. A 1987 performance audit identified weaknesses in administrative oversight, financial controls, facility maintenance, and coordination with local school districts regarding student placement. Although historical, the findings are often cited in discussions of recurring governance and accountability challenges faced by the institution.

=== Campus relocation concerns ===
In 2026, proposals to relocate ASDB's Tucson campus to a different site in Oro Valley prompted public concern from parents and community members. Critics cited potential impacts on students, accessibility, and continuity of services. While the proposal did not involve legal action, the public response reflected ongoing tensions surrounding institutional change and resource allocation.

== Superintendents of the Arizona State Schools for the Deaf and the Blind ==
Years	Superintendent	Position / Role
1912	Henry C. White	First Principal
1990s	Mr. Rislov	Superintendent (exact dates unknown)
1990s	Dr. Bartley	Superintendent (exact dates unknown)
Late 1990s – Early 2000s	Dr. Kenneth D. Randall	Superintendent
Mid‑2000s	Dr. Wilbur H. Lewis	Interim Superintendent
Mid‑2000s	Doris Woltman	Interim Superintendent
Late 2000s – Early 2010s	Dr. Harold E. Hoff	Superintendent
Early 2010s – c. 2014	Robert E. Hill	Superintendent
2014 – 2016	Dr. Marv Lamer	Interim Superintendent
2016 – Present	Annette Reichman	Superintendent
