= The Learning Center for the Deaf =

Coordinates: 42°18′24.02″N 71°25′43.35″W

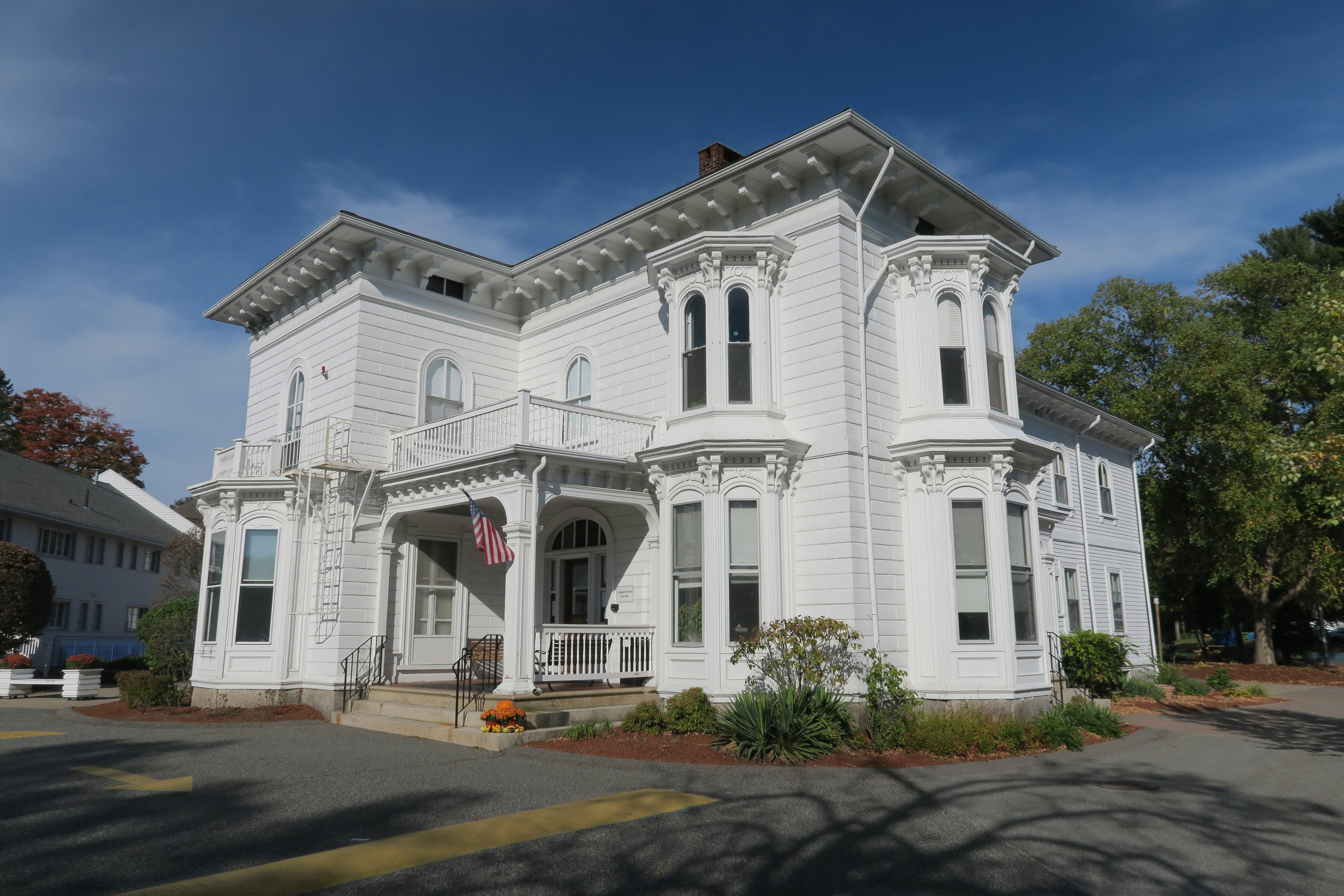
- Framingham, Massachusetts

Information
- Former name: The Learning Center for Deaf Children
- Type: Private, publicly funded
- Motto: "Competence, Character, and Community"
- Established: 1970
- Founder: Warren Schwab
- Superintendent: None
- President: Sarah Glenn-Smith (CEO)
- Grades: Pre-K through 12+
- Language: American Sign Language and written English
- Colors: Blue, Black
- Athletics: Yes
- Athletics conference: New England Preparatory Schools Athletic Council (NEPSAC)
- Mascot: Galloping Ghosts
- Accreditation: New England Association of Schools and Colleges (NEASC); The Conference of Educational Administrators of Schools and programs for the Deaf (CEASD); The Council on Accreditation (COA)
- Website: www.tlcdeaf.org

The Learning Center for the Deaf (TLC) is a Framingham, Massachusetts-based non-profit organization and school serving deaf and hard-of-hearing children and adults. The mission of The Learning Center for the Deaf is to ensure that all deaf and hard of hearing children and adults thrive by having the knowledge, opportunity and power to design the future of their choice.

TLC has three campuses. The main Framingham campus, where the Marie Philip and Walden Schools, and audiology clinic are located. There is also a second Framingham campus which houses Walden Community Services (WCS) and the interpreting department. There is a third campus in Springfield, MA where WCS has an additional office. TLC offers educational programs for deaf and hard of hearing students from infancy through high school. It also provides community programs including American Sign Language (ASL) classes, an audiology clinic, and interpreting services.

== History ==
In 1970, Warren Schwab established TLC in Massachusetts. He focused on a bilingual approach of education focusing on both ASL and the English language. Initially the school had a student-centered curriculum with open classroom format. The school was started with 22 students and expanded in 1975, with the addition of a preschool program, and in 1976 with the addition of a parent-infant program. In 1978, the school established a special education program for deaf children who have cognitive or behavior disabilities. A high school began in 1980, and a group residence for high school students began the following year.

In 1987, TLC opened Walden House, a comprehensive residential treatment program for deaf youth between the ages of 8 and 22 years who are challenged by social and emotional difficulties. A new facility for these students was completed and occupied in December 1995 and is now called the Walden School. In 1994, the school opened a satellite campus in Randolph, Massachusetts, which was closed in 2011.

In 2010, TLC received full accreditation from The New England Association of Schools and Colleges (NEASC), The Conference of Educational Administrators of Schools and Programs for the Deaf (CEASD) and the Council on Accreditation (COA) and continues to maintain full accreditation with each of them.

=== Notable people ===
- Chuck Baird - Chuck Baird is a well-known artist in the deaf community. In 1994, Baird lived in TLC for a year, as an artist in residence, to create a 150-foot-long mural called A Panoramic View of the History of American Sign Language. The mural with three divided sections: the Golden Ages, the Dark Ages, and American Sign Language Revival, was placed on the walls of the Schwab Athletic Center of the Framingham campus.
- Joseph Thomas Kopas - Joseph Thomas Kopas was a member of the deaf community and a teacher is five educational systems, including TLC, where he sent 30 years. When TLC was established, he contributed to the school by being a part of the growth story within the deaf communities throughout the nation. He retired in 2001 and died in 2014.

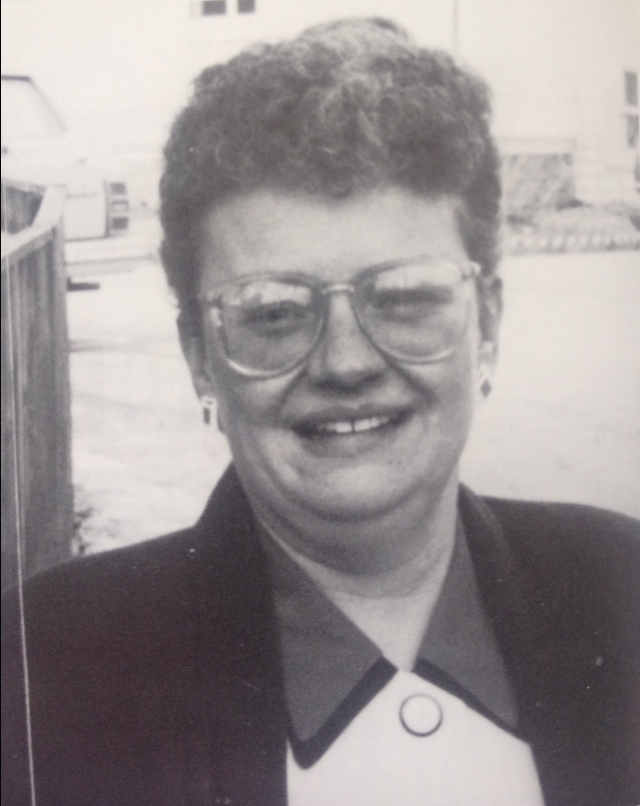
September 1993 Marie Jean Philip at The Learning Center for the Deaf

- Marie Jean Philip - Marie Jean Philip was an educator and advocate in the deaf community. She educated children using both ASL and written English. In her lifetime, she helped promote and support the deaf community and deaf education as well as the bilingual cultural movement including her position as the Bilingual Bicultural Coordinator at TLC. Philip died in 1997. On May 30, 2002, TLC commemorated Philip by naming the new elementary school at TLC as Marie Jean Philip Elementary School. In September 2015, the school named its Pre-K through 12 grade program as the Marie Philip School at The Learning Center for the Deaf.

=== Logo change ===
On May 14, 2016, TLC introduced a new logo for the school which consists of seven concepts that contributed to the logo change. The color green was picked because of the beauty of the green grass on the campus. Butterfly is a symbol of the Deaf community, Ghosts of fire is the school's mascot, Books was as a way to support a bilingual/bicultural education, Inspiration indicates TLC's way of inspiring students, parents, staff and community, Waving Hands represent the sign for applause and TLC Sign Name shows the sign for I Love You.

== Campuses ==
Framingham - TLC's main campus is on 14 acres located in Framingham, Massachusetts with 16 buildings for different purposes. The campus includes the Early Childhood Center focused on infants through five years of age, the Elementary school, ages six to twelve, and Secondary Education, middle through high school.

Walden School - The Walden School is an educational institution and program of TLC that provides housing, support, and educational services for deaf students, between the ages of 8 and 22. Services provided are supportive and student-centered. The Walden School offers a 12-month residential services for their students to be able to live in a private room.

Randolph Campus - In 1994, TLC opened the Randolph Campus in order to provide services to students from infancy through fifth grade. In 2011, the Randolph Campus closed consolidating the Early Childhood Programs to the main campus.

== Community programs ==
TLC has offered an ASL program to the community for over 49 years. The classes teach a wide range of ASL vocabulary, deaf history and deaf culture. This program has been offered.

The audiology clinic is a medical division located on Framingham campus that provides hearing aids, audiological testing services and cochlear implant services. It is a non-profit division of TLC that helps support the school

The Center for Research and Training (CRT) supports culturally and linguistically accessible education for deaf and hard of hearing students by consulting with schools, districts, and states on effective dual language instructional practices in ASL and English. CRT develops STEM-specific educational resources in ASL, consults on bilingual K-12 instruction, and administers bilingual assessments for students ages 4–18. TLC also includes an interpreting service at Framingham campus that serves different needs within the Metro West and Central Massachusetts areas by providing ASL/English translations.

The Public School Partnerships is designed for students who are in public schools and use a hearing aids or cochlear implants.

The Walden Community Services (WCS) program is a community support agency that provides home-based mental health supports to children and families via MassHealth's Children's Behavioral Health Initiative. WCS also contracts to provide Family Support and Stabilization for families via the Massachusetts Department of Children and Families (DCF) Family Networks program. WCS is staffed by Deaf and signing clinicians, family partners, and therapeutic mentors. WCS has offices in Framingham and Springfield, MA.

TLC's Parent Infant Program (PIP) is a specialty early intervention provider. The CTE program prepares deaf and hard of hearing students for employment with a company or as a private contractor. The Learning Center's athletic program operates in a regulation-size gymnasium and on spacious playing fields. The center partners with Special Olympics and offers Unified Sports.

== Recognition ==
TLC received the Outstanding Employer/Partner Award 2018 by RIT/NTID, and Outstanding Organization of the Year 2019 by the Massachusetts Commission for the Deaf and Hard of Hearing.
