= Metro Toronto School for the Deaf =

Metropolitan Toronto School for the Deaf

Location
- 43 Millwood Road; Toronto, Ontario, M4S 1J6; Canada

Information
- School type: Mainstream Public school
- School district: Toronto District School Board
- Superintendent: Michael Smith
- Area trustee: Josh Matlow
- Principal: Shonna Farley
- Grades: K-6 (hearing) K-8 (deaf/hard of hearing)
- Language: American Sign Language (ASL), English
- Colours: Red, Yellow
- Mascot: Dragon
- Team name: Davisville Dragons
- Website: schools.tdsb.on.ca/davisville/banner/index.html

The Metropolitan Toronto School for the Deaf is a division of the public school, Davisville Junior Public School / Metropolitan Toronto School for the Deaf, in Toronto, Ontario with day programs serving deaf and hard-of-hearing students from kindergarten to grade eight. In this division, American Sign Language and Spoken English with the aid of Signed Exact English are used as the languages of communication.

In 1962, the Toronto District School Board moved both schools, The Metropolitan Toronto School for the Deaf and Davisville Junior Public School, into one school building. Until 2002, both schools were operated separately. During the 2009–10 school year, eight students were enrolled in the division.

The Metro Toronto School for the Deaf has moved to the Faywood Arts-Based Curriculum School in North York. The move was triggered because of the shrinking Deaf program (as a result of increased cochlear implant use and Deaf mainstreaming in hearing schools) and the needs of the French-immersion program. The principal of Faywood ABC is Elizabeth Schaeffer.
