= Governor Baxter School for the Deaf =

Public school in Falmouth, Maine, U.S.

Location
- Falmouth, Maine; 43.6907317°N 70.2318515°W

Information
- Type: state operated agency
- Established: 1957
- Grades: preschool–12
- Colors: Blue and Yellow
- Athletics: basketball, soccer
- Athletics conference: Eastern Schools for the Deaf Athletic Association
- Mascot: Islanders
- Website: Official Website

The Governor Baxter School for the Deaf (GBSD), formerly known as the Maine School for the Deaf, is a public co-educational school that serves the deaf and hard-of-hearing in the State of Maine. It is located on Mackworth Island, an approximately 100-acre (40 ha) island in Falmouth, Maine, US, adjacent to its border with Portland, Maine. Students who live far away may stay with host families, who provide residential services. Its program is the Maine Educational Center for the Deaf and Hard of Hearing (MECDHH).

== History ==
While other schools for deaf people existed in Maine, the precursor to the school was the Maine School of the Deaf, founded in 1894 by local lawyer Frederick Fox and former Harvard University President and Unitarian Minister Thomas Hill, who died in 1891. The school was originally located at 85 Spring Street in Downtown Portland.

In 1943, Maine's governor Percival P. Baxter deeded the island and causeway, including his summer home and $750,000, to the State of Maine. In 1957, Senator Hazel Lord of Portland introduced a bill in the State Senate to use the deeded space for the Maine School of the Deaf. After being quickly passed in the Senate, the state moved the school to the island and renamed it the Governor Baxter School for The Deaf. The last graduating class from the Spring Street location celebrated at Frye Hall on Spring Street, the location of the Woman's Literary Union club house. The first class of students at the new campus was 130 students.

Since 2009, GBSD is now a mainstream program within the Portland Public Schools. The preschool program remains on Mackworth Island.

== Programs ==
Students from far away may live with host families. Previously the school contracted with the Sue Wright House of Spurwink. Before then the school had its own dormitory.

In 1991 deaf people protested against a proposal by the administration of Governor of Maine John McKernan Jr. to stop operations of the dormitory.
