= New York State School for the Deaf =

Public school in Rome, New York, U.S.

Location
- 401 Turin Street; Rome, New York; 43.22404°N 75.45498°W

Information
- Type: Public
- Established: 1875
- NCES District ID: 3600154
- Superintendent: Kara Shore
- Faculty: 12
- Grades: Preschool-12
- Enrollment: 43
- Student to teacher ratio: 3.6
- Colors: Forest green and gold
- Athletics: Soccer, Basketball, Softball
- Mascot: Trojans
- Website: Official website

The New York State School for the Deaf (NYSSD) was founded in Rome, New York, in 1874 by Alphonso Johnson, a graduate and former teacher of the NY Institution for the Deaf. The school now operates under the New York State Board of Regents.

== History ==
Alphonso Johnson, a deaf graduate of the New York Institution for the Deaf and former teacher there founded a deaf school in Rome, New York in 1874 with the assistance of Rev. Thomas Gallaudet. The school opened in 1875 with four pupils, with Johnson as principal and teacher. The next year, the school began operating as the Central New York Institution for Deaf-Mutes. Within three years, attendance rose to 100 and more buildings began construction.

In 1887, the New York State Legislature appropriated funds for several buildings, including Gallaudet Hall, as it was later named. In 1931 the school became the Central New York School for the Deaf. In 1963, by act of the Legislature, the school became part of the New York State Education Department and underwent a further name change to New York State School for the Deaf. In the 1960s and 1970s, the state legislature passed bills to construct new buildings and expand the campus to 17 acres. Residential dorms were completed in 1969 and are still in use by about half of students.

== Organization ==
Formerly a corporation, the school is a state operated agency and is now a part of the New York State Education Department and the New York State Board of Regents. It is governed by Title VI Special Schools and Instruction, article 88 of the NY State Code.

== Educational program ==
NYSSD has programs for elementary education, middle school, high school, college prep, career prep and vocational education (in collaboration with Madison-Oneida BOCES), daily living skills, and fine arts. It also has a program for deaf infants.

== Athletics ==
NYSSD competes in girls' and boys' soccer, basketball, and track, and in co-ed softball. It belongs to the New York State Public High School Athletic Association (NYSPHSAA), the Eastern Schools for the Deaf Athletic Association (ESDAA), and the public school North Country Athletic Conference (NCAC).
