= List of boarding schools in the United States =

The following are notable boarding schools in the United States.

== By state/territory ==
=== Alabama ===
- Alabama Institute for the Deaf and Blind (Talladega)
- Alabama School of Fine Arts (Birmingham)
- Alabama School of Math and Science (Mobile)
- Indian Springs School (Indian Springs Village)
- Southern Preparatory Academy (Camp Hill)
- St. Bernard Preparatory School (Cullman)

=== Alaska ===
- Galena Interior Learning Academy (Galena)
- Mt. Edgecumbe High School (Sitka)
- Nenana Student Living Center (Nenana)

=== Arizona ===
- Arizona State Schools for the Deaf and Blind Tucson Campus (Tucson)
- Greyhills Academy High School (Tuba City)
- Hunters Point Boarding School (St. Michaels)
- Kaibeto Boarding School (Kaibito)
- Many Farms Community School (Many Farms)
- Many Farms High School (Many Farms)
- Rough Rock Community School (Rough Rock)
- Shonto Prep High School (Shonto)
- Tuba City Boarding School (Tuba City)
- Verde Valley School (Sedona)

=== Arkansas ===
- Arkansas School for the Blind and Visually Impaired (Little Rock)
- Arkansas School for the Deaf (Little Rock)
- Arkansas School for Mathematics, Sciences, and the Arts (Hot Springs)
- Ozark Adventist Academy (Gentry)
- Subiaco Academy (Subiaco)

=== California ===
- Army and Navy Academy (Carlsbad)
- The Athenian School (Danville)
- Besant Hill School of Happy Valley (Ojai)
- California Academy of Mathematics and Science (As of 1993, Carson)
- California School for the Blind (Fremont)
- California School for the Deaf, Fremont (Fremont)
- California School for the Deaf, Riverside (Riverside)
- Cate School (Carpinteria)
- Dunn School (Los Olivos)
- Flintridge Sacred Heart Academy (La Cañada Flintridge)
- Idyllwild Arts Academy (Idyllwild)
- Julian Youth Academy (San Diego)
- Lake Tahoe Preparatory School (Olympic Valley)
- Midland School (Los Olivos)
- Monte Vista Christian School (Watsonville)
- Ojai Valley School (Ojai)
- St. Catherine's Academy (Anaheim)
- Santa Catalina School (Monterey)
- Sherman Indian High School (Riverside)
- Stevenson School (Pebble Beach)
- The Thacher School (Ojai)
- Villanova Preparatory School (Ojai)
- The Webb Schools (Claremont)
- Woodside Priory School (Portola Valley)

=== Colorado ===
- Colorado Rocky Mountain School (Carbondale)
- Colorado School for the Deaf and Blind (Knob Hill)
- Fountain Valley School (Colorado Springs)
- Lowell Whiteman School (Steamboat Springs)

=== Connecticut ===
- Academy of the Holy Family (Sprague)
- Avon Old Farms School (Avon)
- Bridgeport International Academy (Bridgeport)
- Canterbury School (New Milford)
- Cheshire Academy (Cheshire)
- Choate Rosemary Hall (Wallingford)
- Devereux Glenholme School (Washington)
- Ethel Walker School (Simsbury)
- Forman School (Litchfield)
- Franklin Academy (East Haddam)
- Gilbert School (Winsted)
- Grove School (Madison)
- The Gunnery (Washington)
- Hotchkiss School (Lakeville)
- Indian Mountain School (Lakeville)
- Kent School (Kent)
- The Loomis Chaffee School (Windsor)
- Marianapolis Preparatory School (Thompson)
- Marvelwood School (Kent)
- Miss Porter's School (Farmington)
- Oxford Academy (Westbrook)
- Pomfret School (Pomfret)
- The Rectory School (Pomfret)
- Rumsey Hall School (Washington)
- The Salisbury School (Salisbury)
- South Kent School (South Kent)
- Suffield Academy (Suffield)
- Taft School (Watertown)
- Westminster School (Simsbury)
- Westover School (Middlebury)
- The Woodhall School (Bethlehem)
- Woodstock Academy (Woodstock)

=== Delaware ===
- Delaware School for the Deaf (Brookside)
- St. Andrew's School (Middletown)

=== District of Columbia ===
- Model Secondary School for the Deaf
- St. Albans School
- The SEED School

=== Florida ===
- Admiral Farragut Academy (St. Petersburg)
- The Bolles School (Jacksonville)
- Florida School for the Deaf and Blind (St. Augustine)
- IMG Academy (Bradenton)
- Saint Andrew's School (Boca Raton)
- Windermere Preparatory School (Windermere)

=== Georgia ===
- Darlington School (Rome)
- Georgia Academy for the Blind (Macon)
- Georgia School for the Deaf (Cave Spring)
- Rabun Gap-Nacoochee School (Rabun Gap)
- Riverside Military Academy (Gainesville)
- Tallulah Falls School (Tallulah Falls)

=== Hawaii ===
- Asia Pacific International School (Hauʻula)
- Hawaii School for the Deaf and the Blind (Honolulu)
- Hawaii Preparatory Academy (Kamuela)
- ʻIolani School (Honolulu)
- Kamehameha Schools (Honolulu)
- Lahainaluna High School (Lahaina)

=== Idaho ===
- Idaho School for the Deaf and the Blind (Gooding)

=== Illinois ===
- Illinois Mathematics and Science Academy (Aurora)
- Illinois School for the Deaf (Jacksonville)
- Illinois School for the Visually Impaired (Jacksonville)
- Lake Forest Academy (Lake Forest)
- St. Bede Academy (Peru)
- Woodlands Academy of the Sacred Heart (Lake Forest)

=== Indiana ===
- Culver Academies (Culver)
- Indiana Academy for Science, Mathematics, and Humanities (Muncie)
- Indiana School for the Blind and Visually Impaired (Indianapolis)
- Indiana School for the Deaf (Indianapolis)
- La Lumiere School (La Porte)

=== Iowa ===
- Iowa School for the Deaf (Council Bluffs)
- Maharishi School of the Age of Enlightenment (Fairfield)
- Scattergood Friends School (West Branch)

=== Kansas ===
- Kansas Academy of Mathematics and Science (Hays)
- Kansas School for the Deaf (Olathe)
- Kansas State School for the Blind (Kansas City)
- Maur Hill Mount Academy (Atchison)
- St. John's Military School (Salina)
- St. Mary's College, Kansas (St. Marys)
- Thomas More Prep-Marian (Hays)

=== Kentucky ===
- Appalachian Children's Home (Barbourville)
- Craft Academy for Excellence in Science and Mathematics (Morehead)
- Carol Martin Gatton Academy of Mathematics and Science in Kentucky (Bowling Green)
- Kentucky School for the Blind (Louisville)
- Kentucky School for the Deaf (Danville)
- Oneida Baptist Institute (Oneida)

=== Louisiana ===
- Academy of the Sacred Heart (Grand Coteau)
- Louisiana School for the Deaf (Baton Rouge)
- Louisiana School for the Visually Impaired (Baton Rouge)
- Louisiana School for Math, Science, and the Arts (Natchitoches)

=== Maine ===
- Fryeburg Academy (Fryeburg)
- Gould Academy (Bethel)
- Kents Hill School (Kents Hill)
- Maine School of Science and Mathematics (Limestone)

=== Maryland ===
- Garrison Forest School (Owings Mills, Maryland)
- Georgetown Preparatory School (North Bethesda)
- Maryland School for the Blind (Baltimore)
- Maryland School for the Deaf (Frederick/Columbia)
- McDonogh School (Owings Mills)
- Oldfields School (Glencoe)
- St. James School (St. James)
- St. Timothy's School (Stevenson)
- The SEED School (Baltimore)
- West Nottingham Academy (Colora)

=== Massachusetts ===
- Berkshire School (Sheffield)
- Brooks School (North Andover)
- Buxton School (Williamstown)
- Cambridge School of Weston (Weston)
- Chapel Hill - Chauncy Hall School (Waltham)
- Concord Academy (Concord)
- Cushing Academy (Ashburnham)
- Dana Hall School (Wellesley)
- Deerfield Academy (Deerfield)
- Eagle Hill School (Hardwick)
- Eaglebrook School (Deerfield)
- Fay School (Southborough)
- Fessenden School (West Newton)
- The Governor's Academy (formerly Governor Dummer Academy) (Byfield)
- Groton School (Groton)
- John Dewey Academy (Great Barrington)
- Lawrence Academy at Groton (Groton)
- MacDuffie School (Granby)
- Middlesex School (Concord)
- Milton Academy (Milton)
- Miss Hall's School (Pittsfield)
- Northfield Mount Hermon School (Northfield and Gill)
- Phillips Academy (Andover)
- Riverview School (East Sandwich)
- St. Mark's School (Southborough)
- Stetson School, (Barre)
- Stoneleigh-Burnham School (Greenfield)
- Tabor Academy (Marion)
- Walnut Hill School (Natick)
- Wilbraham and Monson Academy (Wilbraham)
- Williston Northampton School (Easthampton)
- The Winchendon School (Winchendon)
- Worcester Academy (Worcester)

=== Michigan ===
- Cranbrook Kingswood School (Bloomfield Hills)
- Great Lakes Adventist Academy (Cedar Lake)
- Interlochen Arts Academy (Interlochen)
- The Leelanau School (Glen Arbor)
- Michigan School for the Deaf (Flint)
- Taylor International Dormitory

=== Minnesota ===
- Cotter High School (Winona)
- Minnesota State Academy for the Blind (Faribault)
- Minnesota State Academy for the Deaf (Faribault)
- St. Croix Lutheran High School (West St. Paul)
- Saint John's Prep (Collegeville)
- Shattuck-Saint Mary's (Faribault)

=== Mississippi ===
- Choctaw Tribal School System
- French Camp Academy (French Camp)
- Mississippi School for Mathematics and Science (Columbus)
- Mississippi School of the Arts (Brookhaven)
- Mississippi School for the Blind (Jackson)
- Mississippi School for the Deaf (Jackson)
- Piney Woods Country Life School (Piney Woods)
- Saint Stanislaus College (Bay St. Louis)

=== Missouri ===
- Chaminade College Preparatory School (St. Louis)
- Missouri Military Academy (Mexico)
- Missouri School for the Deaf (Fulton)
- Thomas Jefferson School (Sunset Hills)

=== Montana ===
- Montana School for the Deaf & Blind (Great Falls)

=== Nebraska ===
- Mt. Michael Benedictine (Elkhorn)
- Nebraska Center for the Education of Children Who Are Blind or Visually Impaired (Nebraska City)

=== New Hampshire ===
- Brewster Academy (Wolfeboro)
- Cardigan Mountain School (Canaan)
- Dublin Christian Academy (Dublin)
- Dublin School (Dublin)
- Hampshire Country School (Rindge)
- High Mowing School (Wilton)
- Holderness School (Holderness)
- Kimball Union Academy (Meriden)
- New Hampton School (New Hampton)
- Oliverian School (Haverhill)
- Phillips Exeter Academy (Exeter)
- Proctor Academy (Andover)
- St. Paul's School (Concord)
- Tilton School (Tilton)
- Wediko Children's Services (Windsor)

=== New Jersey ===
- Blair Academy (Blairstown)
- The Hun School (Princeton)
- Marie H. Katzenbach School for the Deaf (West Trenton)
- The Lawrenceville School (Lawrenceville)
- The Peddie School (Hightstown)
- The Pennington School (Pennington)
- St. Benedict's Preparatory School (Newark)

=== New Mexico ===
- Armand Hammer United World College of the American West (Montezuma)
- Menaul School (Albuquerque)
- New Mexico Military Institute (Roswell)
- New Mexico School for the Arts (Santa Fe)
- New Mexico School for the Blind and Visually Impaired (Alamogordo)
- New Mexico School for the Deaf (Santa Fe)
- Navajo Preparatory School (Farmington)
- Pine Hill Schools (Ramah Navajo) (Pine Hill)
- Santa Fe Indian School (Santa Fe)
- Shiprock Associated Schools, Inc. - Atsá Biyáázh Community School (elementary) and Northwest Middle & High School (Shiprock)
- Wingate High School (Fort Wingate)

=== New York ===
- Bard Academy (Barrytown)
- Darrow School (New Lebanon)
- Education First EF Academy (Thornwood)
- Emma Willard School (Troy)
- Storm King School (Cornwall-on-Hudson)
- Gow School (South Wales)
- Hackley School (Tarrytown)
- Keio Academy of New York (Harrison)
- Léman Manhattan Preparatory School (New York City)
- The Masters School (Dobbs Ferry)
- Millbrook School (Millbrook)
- New York State School for the Blind (Batavia)
- New York State School for the Deaf (Rome)
- North Country School (Lake Placid)
- Northwood School (Lake Placid)
- Randolph Academy Union Free School District (only the campus in Randolph has boarding)
- Ross School (East Hampton)
- Saint Thomas Choir School (New York City)
- The Stony Brook School (Stony Brook)
- Trinity-Pawling School (Pawling)

=== North Carolina ===
- American Hebrew Academy (Greensboro)
- Arthur Morgan School (Yancey County)
- Asheville School (Asheville)
- Christ School (Arden)
- Eastern North Carolina School for the Deaf (Wilson)
- Governor Morehead School (for blind) (Raleigh)
- New Leaf Academy (Hendersonville)
- North Carolina School of the Arts (Winston-Salem)
- North Carolina School of Science and Mathematics (Durham)
- North Carolina School for the Deaf (Morganton)
- Oak Ridge Military Academy (Oak Ridge)
- Saint Mary's School (Raleigh)
- Salem Academy (Winston-Salem)

=== North Dakota ===
- Circle of Nations Wahpeton Indian School (Wahpeton)
- North Dakota School for the Deaf (Devils Lake)
- North Dakota Vision Services/School for the Blind (Grand Forks)

=== Ohio ===
- Andrews Osborne Academy (Willoughby)
- Gilmour Academy (Gates Mills)
- Grand River Academy (Austinburg)
- Maumee Valley Country Day School (Toledo)
- Ohio State School for the Blind (Columbus)
- Ohio School for the Deaf (Columbus)
- Olney Friends School (Barnesville)
- Western Reserve Academy (Hudson)

=== Oklahoma ===
- Jones Academy - boarding school for grades 1-6, dormitory only for grades 7-12 (unincorporated Pittsburg County)
- Oklahoma School for the Blind (Muskogee)
- Oklahoma School for the Deaf (Sulphur)
- Oklahoma School of Science and Mathematics (Oklahoma City)
- Riverside Indian School (near Anadarko)
- Sequoyah High School (Park Hill)

=== Oregon ===
- Academy for Global Exploration (Ashland)
- Chemawa Indian School (Salem)
- Crane Union High School (Crane) - a public (state supported) school with boarding students due to the school district's vastness
- The Delphian School (Sheridan)
- Harper School (Harper)
- Huntington School (Huntington)
- Mitchell School (Mitchell)
- New Leaf Academy (Bend)
- Oregon Episcopal School (Raleigh Hills)
- Oregon School for the Deaf (Salem)
- Paisley School (Paisley)
- St. Mary's School (Medford)
- Spray School (Spray)

=== Pennsylvania ===
- Church Farm School (Exton)
- George School (Newtown)
- Girard College (Philadelphia)
- The Grier School (Tyrone)
- The Hill School (Pottstown)
- The Kiski School (Saltsburg)
- Linden Hall (Lititz) - first girls' boarding school in the United States (1746)
- Mercersburg Academy (Mercersburg)
- Milton Hershey School (Hershey)
- Perkiomen School (Pennsburg)
- The Phelps School (Malvern)
- Pine Forge Academy (Pine Forge)
- Solebury School (New Hope)
- Westtown School (Westtown)
- Wyoming Seminary (Kingston)

=== Puerto Rico ===
- Albergue Olímpico (Salinas)
- CROEM (Mayagüez)
- Robinson School (Condado, San Juan)

=== Rhode Island ===
- Immaculate Conception Academy (Wakefield)
- Portsmouth Abbey School (Portsmouth)
- St. Andrew's School (Barrington)
- St. George's School (Middletown)

=== South Carolina ===
- Camden Military Academy (Camden)
- Cherokee Creek Boys School (Westminster)
- South Carolina Governor's School for Agriculture at John de la Howe (McCormick County)
- South Carolina Governor's School for the Arts and Humanities (Greenville)
- South Carolina Governor's School for Science and Mathematics (Hartsville)
- South Carolina School for the Deaf and the Blind (Spartanburg County)

=== South Dakota ===
- Cheyenne-Eagle Butte School (Eagle Butte)
- Crow Creek Tribal School (Stephan)
- Flandreau Indian School (near Flandreau)
- Marty Indian School (Marty)
- Pierre Indian Learning Center (Pierre)
- Pine Ridge School (Pine Ridge)
- South Dakota School for the Blind and Visually Impaired (Aberdeen)

=== Tennessee ===
- Baylor School (Chattanooga)
- Highland Academy (Portland)
- McCallie School (Chattanooga)
- St. Andrew's-Sewanee School (Sewanee)
- Tennessee School for the Blind (Donelson)
- Tennessee School for the Deaf (Knoxville)
- The Webb School (Bell Buckle)
- West Tennessee School for the Deaf (Jackson)

=== Texas ===
- Cal Farley's Boys Ranch (in the Boys Ranch Independent School District)
- Brook Hill School (Bullard)
- The Chinquapin School (Houston)
- Hockaday School (Dallas)
- Marine Military Academy (Harlingen)
- St. Stephen's Episcopal School (Austin)
- San Marcos Baptist Academy (San Marcos)
- Texas Academy of Leadership in the Humanities (Beaumont)
- Texas Academy of Mathematics and Science (Denton)
- Texas School for the Blind and Visually Impaired (Austin)
- Texas School for the Deaf (Austin)
- TMI — The Episcopal School of Texas (San Antonio)

=== Utah ===
- Castle Valley Academy (Castle Valley)
- Logan River Academy (Logan)
- Provo Canyon School (Provo/Orem)
- Utah Schools for the Deaf and the Blind (Ogden Campus)
- Wasatch Academy (Mt. Pleasant)

=== Vermont ===
- Green Mountain Valley School (Waitsfield)
- The Putney School (Putney)
- St. Johnsbury Academy (St. Johnsbury)
- Stratton Mountain School (Stratton)
- Vermont Academy (Saxtons River)

=== Virginia ===
- Blue Ridge School (St. George)
- Chatham Hall (Chatham)
- Christchurch School (Christchurch)
- Episcopal High School (Alexandria)
- Fishburne Military School (Waynesboro)
- Fork Union Military Academy (Fork Union)
- Foxcroft School (Middleburg)
- Hargrave Military Academy (Chatham)
- Madeira School (McLean)
- Massanutten Military Academy (Woodstock)
- The Miller School of Albemarle (Charlottesville)
- Randolph-Macon Academy (Front Royal)
- St. Anne's-Belfield School (Charlottesville)
- Shenandoah Valley Academy (New Market)
- Virginia Episcopal School (Lynchburg)
- Virginia School for the Deaf and the Blind (Staunton)
- Woodberry Forest School (Madison County)

=== Washington ===
- Annie Wright School (Tacoma)
- Auburn Adventist Academy (Auburn)
- Lummi Nation School (near Bellingham)
- Northwest School (Seattle)
- Upper Columbia Academy (Spangle)
- Washington School for the Deaf (Vancouver)
- Washington State School for the Blind (Vancouver)

=== West Virginia ===
- Greenbrier Academy (Pence Springs)
- The Highland School (Highland)
- Linsly School (Wheeling)
- West Virginia Schools for the Deaf and the Blind (Romney)

=== Wisconsin ===
- Luther Preparatory School (Watertown)
- Oaklawn Academy (Edgerton)
- St. John's Northwestern Military Academy (Delafield)
- St. Lawrence Seminary High School (Mt. Calvary)
- Wayland Academy (Beaver Dam)
- Wisconsin School for the Blind and Visually Impaired (Janesville)
- Wisconsin School for the Deaf (Delavan)

== Former boarding schools ==
Closed

- Academy at Swift River (Cummington, Massachusetts) - closed 2013
- Agape Baptist Academy (Stockton, Missouri) - closed 2023
- Albuquerque Indian School (Albuquerque, New Mexico) - closed 1981
- Allynwood Academy (Hancock, New York) - closed 2014
- American Boychoir School (Princeton, New Jersey) - closed 2017
- Bachman Academy (McDonald, Tennessee) - closed 2017
- Brandon Hall School (Atlanta, Georgia) - closed 2023
- Brenau Academy (Gainesville, Georgia) (see Brenau University) - closed 2012
- Bromley Brook School (Manchester Center, Vermont) - closed 2011
- Carlbrook School (Halifax, Virginia) - closed 2015
- Carlisle Indian Industrial School (Carlisle, Pennsylvania) - closed 1918
- Carson Long Military Academy (New Bloomfield, Pennsylvania) - closed 2018
- CEDU (California and Idaho)
- Central North Carolina School for the Deaf (Greensboro, North Carolina) - closed 2001
- Chrysalis (Eureka, Montana) - closed 2017
- Circle of Hope Girls Ranch (Humansville, Missouri) - closed 2020
- Conserve School (Land O' Lakes, Wisconsin) - closed 2020
- Diamond Ranch Academy (Hurricane, Utah) - closed 2023
- Élan School (Poland, Maine) - closed 2011
- Fenster School (Tucson, Arizona) - closed 2016
- Greenbrier Military School (Lewisburg, West Virginia) - closed 1972
- Hidden Lake Academy (Dahlonega, Georgia) - closed 2010
- Hopevale Union Free School District (Hamburg) (boarding ended in 2010, merged into Randolph Academy UFSD in 2011)
- Immaculate Conception Apostolic School (Center Harbor, New Hampshire) - closed 2015
- Iowa Braille and Sight Saving School (Vinton, Iowa) - (boarding ended 2011)
- The Kildonan School (Amenia, New York) - closed 2019
- King George School (Sutton, Vermont) - closed 2011
- Lewisville Female Seminary (Chester, South Carolina) - closed 1854
- Michigan School for the Blind (Lansing, Michigan) - closed 1994
- Native American Preparatory School (San Miguel County, New Mexico - closed 2002
- Mission Mountain School (Condon, Montana) - closed 2008
- Missouri Academy of Science, Mathematics and Computing (Maryville, Missouri) - closed 2018
- Monarch School (Heron, Montana) - closed 2017
- Montana Academy (Marion, Montana) - closed 2021
- Mount Bachelor Academy (Prineville, Oregon) - closed 2009
- Mount Vernon Academy (Mount Vernon, Ohio) - closed 2015
- Nebraska School for the Deaf (Omaha, Nebraska) - closed 1998
- Old West Academy (Randolph, Utah) - closed 2019
- Oregon School for the Blind, (Salem, Oregon) - closed 2009
- Oakley School (Oakley, Utah) - closed 2017
- The Orme School of Arizona (Mayer, Arizona) - closed 2025
- Phoenix Indian School (Phoenix, Arizona) - closed 1990
- Purnell School (Pottersville, New Jersey) - closed 2021
- Romney Classical Institute (Romney, West Virginia) - closed c. 1866
- Scranton State School for the Deaf (Scranton, Pennsylvania) - closed 2009
- Secret Harbor School (Cypress Island, Washington) - closed 2000
- Shortridge Academy (Milton, New Hampshire) - closed 2023
- Spring Creek Lodge Academy (Thompson Falls, Montana) - closed 2009
- South Dakota School for the Deaf - dorms closed in 2005, later closed entirely
- Spring Ridge Academy (Mayer, Arizona) - closed 2023
- St. Margaret's School (Tappahannock, Virginia) - closed 2025
- St. Michael's Preparatory School (Silverado, California) - closed 2020
- Staunton Military Academy (Staunton, Virginia) - closed in 1976
- Tennessee Governor's Academy for Math and Science (Knoxville, Tennessee) - closed 2011
- Texas Blind, Deaf, and Orphan School (Austin, Texas) - closed 1965
- Valley Forge Military Academy (Wayne, Pennsylvania) - closed 2026
- Virginia School for the Deaf, Blind and Multi-Disabled at Hampton (Hampton, Virginia) - closed 2008
- Wellspring Academies (Reedley, California and Brevard, North Carolina)
- White Mountain School (Bethlehem, New Hampshire) - closed 2024
- Wyoming School for the Deaf (Casper) - closed 2000

Still open, dormitories closed

- Devon Preparatory School (Tredyffrin Township, Pennsylvania)
- Rock Point Community School (Rock Point, Arizona)
- Governor Baxter School for the Deaf (Falmouth, Maine)
- Northern Cheyenne Tribal School (Busby, Montana)
- Oakland School (Troy, Virginia)
- Rhode Island School for the Deaf (Providence, Rhode Island)

Still boarding children, but no longer function as in-house schools

- Saint Basil Academy (Garrison, New York) - in-house school functions ended in 1997

== See also ==
- Lists of schools in the United States
- List of boarding schools
- List of international schools in the United States
- Therapeutic boarding school
