= Diamond Academy =

Diamond Academy may refer to:

- Diamond Ranch Academy, school in Utah, United States
- Shree Diamond Public Academy, school in Nepal
