= Troy Orphan Asylum =

Coordinates: 42.6914°N 73.6152°W

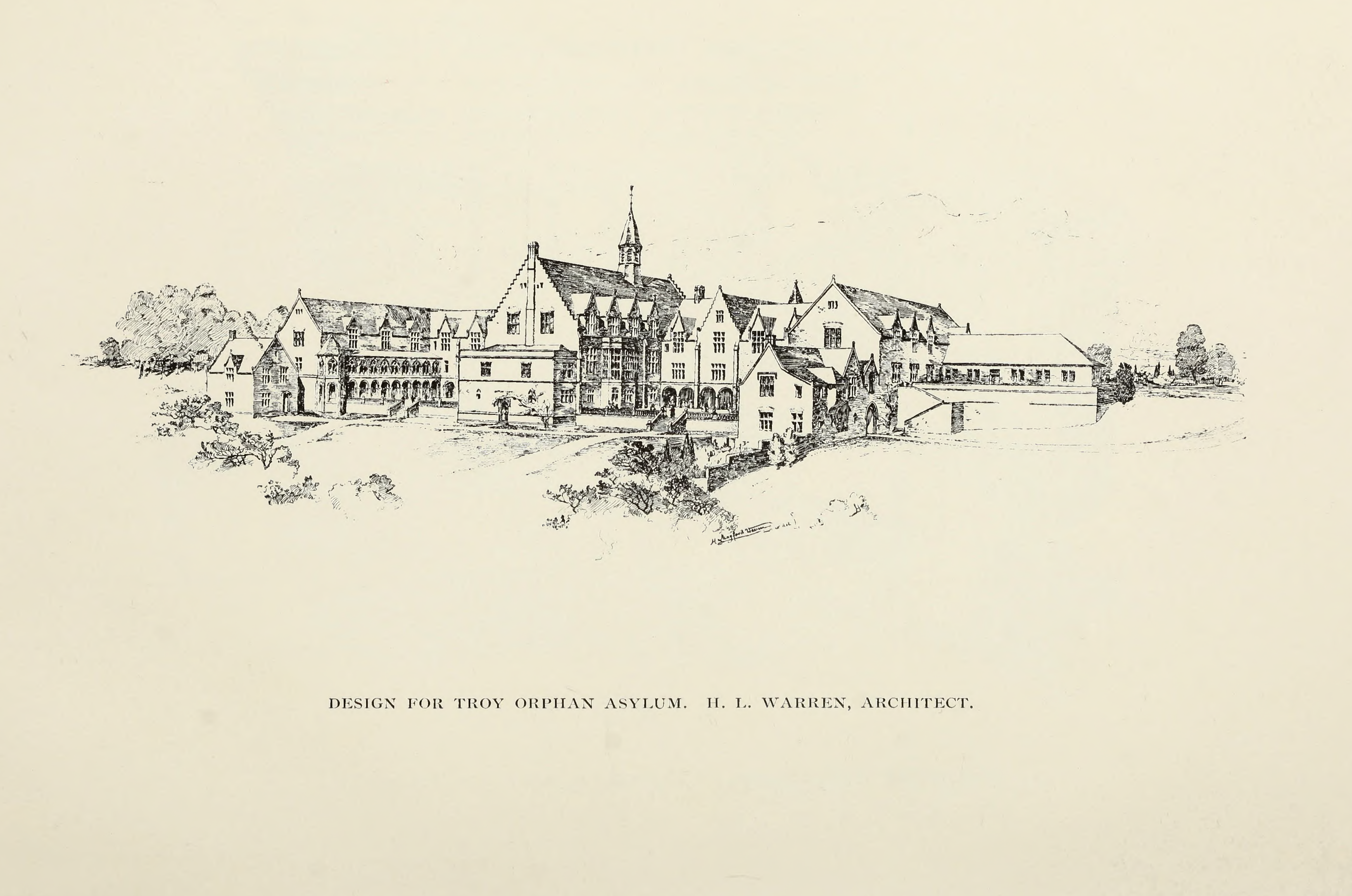
Design for the Troy Orphan Asylum

Troy Orphan Asylum (formerly Vanderheyden Hall) is a not-for-profit organization based in Wynantskill, New York, that works with youth and families in need across the Capital Region. It originated as the Troy Orphan Asylum in 1833.

== History ==
In 1800, the Benevolent Society of Troy to Assist Indigent Women and Children was founded in Troy, New York. The Society opened the Troy Orphan Asylum in 1833. The name was changed to Vanderheyden Hall in 1942, and today the organization is known as simply "Vanderheyden."

Across the river in Watervliet, the Fairview Home for Friendless Children was founded in 1888 by James Barclay Jermain, a lawyer and local philanthropist. In 1956, the Fairview Home merged with the Troy Orphan Asylum. Services moved to the Troy location as the Fairview property, located on Boght Road, was sold to Behr-Manning in 1957.

According to a Times Union article, the Troy Orphan Asylum was originally located on Spring Avenue, where it was known as "the house on the hill." An 1877 map locates the orphanage at Eighth St. and Hutton St., however.

Troy Orphan Asylum was one of the orphanages from which Martha Van Rensselaer, director of the Cornell College of Home Economics, requested infants be used as "practice babies" for home economics students in the 1920s.

A former resident of the Troy Orphan Asylum describes the living conditions as highly regimented yet not too harsh. Children were brought to church on Sundays, were allowed to play outside frequently, and went on regular outings to Frear Park and other destinations.

== Vanderheyden today ==
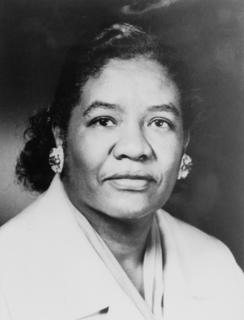
Dorothy Lavinia Brown

The modern Vanderheyden serves over 500 individuals and families in locations throughout the Capital Region, including a main campus and residential facility at 614 Cooper Hill Road in Wynantskill. Vanderheyden provides a New York State Regents-accredited school program for youth grades 7-12, a residential program, youth emergency services, and community and home-based programs including outings and events for children and families. It is an 853 school. Karen Carpenter-Palumbo, formerly the commissioner of the New York State Office of Alcoholism and Substance Abuse Services, has served as Vanderheyden's president/CEO since 2012.

== Notable residents ==
Dorothy Lavinia Brown lived at the Troy Orphan Asylum from the time she was five months old until she was about twelve (1914-1926). Her mother tried to adopt her back, but Brown repeatedly ran away from her mother and returned to the orphanage. During her stay there, she found inspiration to study medicine. Brown went on to become the first African American female surgeon in the southern United States, and the first African American woman to become a fellow at the American College of Surgeons.
