= Gustavus Ernest Lineberry =

Gustavus Ernest Lineberry (1870–1952) was an American educator and administrator from North Carolina, who served as superintendent of the North Carolina State School for the Blind and Deaf from 1918–45.

As superintendent, Lineberry oversaw significant improvements to both the main campus in Raleigh and the segregated campus for African American students.
