= LaQuan McGowan =

American football player (born 1993)

No. 00, 44
- Positions: Fullback, offensive tackle

Personal information
- Born: March 4, 1993 (age 33); Amarillo, Texas, U.S.
- Listed height: 6 ft 6 in (1.98 m)
- Listed weight: 410 lb (186 kg)

Career information
- High school: Boys Ranch (Boys Ranch, Texas)
- College: Baylor (2013–2015)
- NFL draft: 2016: undrafted

Career history
- Montreal Alouettes (2016)*; Triangle Torch (2017); Carolina Cobras (2018)
- * Offseason or practice squad member only
- Stats at Pro Football Reference

LaQuan McGowan (born March 4, 1993) is an American former football fullback and offensive tackle. He played college football at Baylor and later had stints in the Canadian Football League (CFL) and National Arena League (NAL).

== Early life ==
McGowan played high school football at Boys Ranch High School at Boys Ranch, Texas. He was rated the 92nd best offensive tackle by ESPN.com.

== Professional career ==
Pre-draft measurables
| Height | Weight | Arm length | Hand span | 40-yard dash | 10-yard split | 20-yard split | 20-yard shuttle | Three-cone drill | Vertical jump | Broad jump | Bench press |
|---|---|---|---|---|---|---|---|---|---|---|---|
| 6 ft 6 1/8 in (1.98 m) | 405 lb (184 kg) | 35 3/4 in (0.91 m) | 10 5/8 in (0.27 m) | 5.41 s | 1.85 s | 3.06 s | 5.47 s | 8.25 s | 24.0 in (0.61 m) | 8 ft 2 in (2.49 m) | 30 reps |
All values from Pro Day

McGowan went undrafted in the NFL. He signed with the CFL's Montreal Alouettes but was waived soon after. Later in 2017, he signed with the Triangle Torch, then, following the season, he was released. Lastly he played with the Carolina Cobras for the 2018 year.
