= Yakima Valley Academy =

Defunct school in Washington, United States

Coordinates: 46.66008°N 120.53741°W

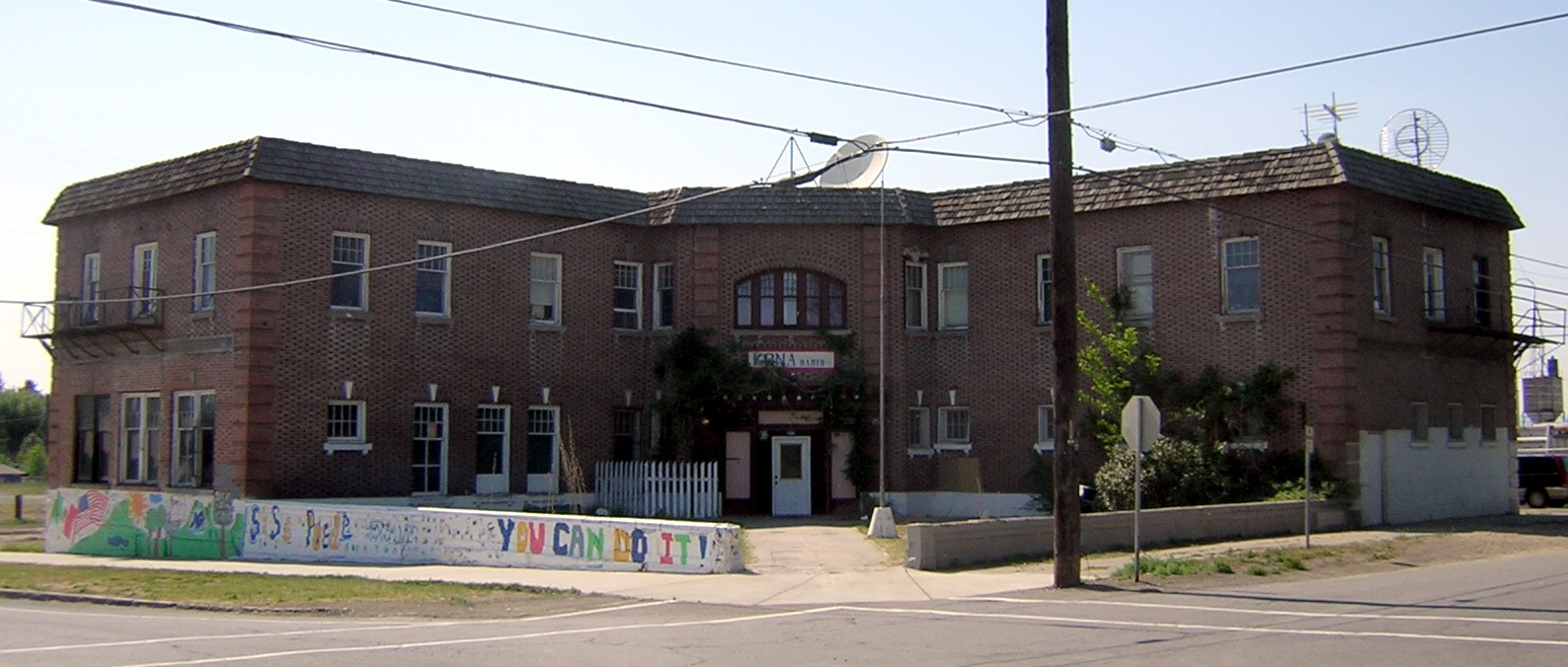
- Yakima Valley Academy building, May 2007

Information
- Religious affiliation: Seventh-day Adventist Church
- Established: 1921
- Closed: 1945
- Gender: Mixed
- Enrollment: 170 (1944)

Yakima Valley Academy was a Seventh-day Adventist elementary school and co-educational boarding high school located in Granger, WA and operated from 1921-1964 The handsome brick, three-story building that housed the academy was purchased in 1920 for $14,000 by the Upper Columbia Conference of Seventh-day Adventists. The building, which had served as a hotel prior to housing the academy, stood until August 2008, though the top story had been removed. By 1944 the school had outgrown its quarters and preparations were made to move the school to a newly purchased site at Spangle, WA where the institution opened in the fall of 1945 under the name Upper Columbia Academy.

The yearbook, published annually by the student body, was named The Pitcanook. The 1938 edition lists a faculty and administration of 12 who taught a variety of subjects: Bible, German, Piano, Voice, Bookkeeping, Typing, English, Health Education, Science, Chemistry, History, Sewing, Baking, Shorthand, and Mathematics. The yearbook highlights a variety of activities and student organizations and suggests a total high school student body of 106. By 1944, this figure had grown to 170.
