= Central North Carolina School for the Deaf =

Defunct school in North Carolina, United States

Coordinates: 36.169°N 79.720°W

Central North Carolina School for the Deaf was a PreK–8 school for deaf children operated by the State of North Carolina, located in Greensboro.

It served nineteen counties in the state, with the area including Durham and Winston-Salem.

It was operated by the North Carolina Department of Health and Human Services.

== History ==
It was established in 1975. The number of deaf children had exploded in the state due to an epidemic of rubella in the late 1950s and early 1960s.

It opened in the summer in temporary facilities in Raleigh with 175 students up to grade 6. It was to move to Greensboro in the fall.

By 1995 the school was already using American sign language as its predominant language of communication while the North Carolina School for the Deaf and the Eastern North Carolina School for the Deaf had not fully transitioned into using ASL.

In 1995 North Carolina officials were considering closing the school due to its small size, something opposed by members of the community. The student population decreased as public schools operated by school districts began accommodating deaf children in mainstreaming programs, and the 1950s/1960s rubella wave children were now adults.

Susan Sein was acting director until 2000, when she moved to a job at the Texas School for the Deaf. Dr. Henry Widmer replaced her.

In 2000 auditors for the state recommended it close one of the three schools for the deaf as the population declined further. The state chose Central NC to close, effective spring 2001.

== Student body ==
In 1995 there were 92 students, with 78 in grades K–8 and 14 in preschool. 56 were boarding students. 80% of them had families 50 miles (80 km) or fewer from the school. In 2000 it had 78 students. In 2001 it was down to 29 students with 11 boarders. In 2000 there were over 50 employees.

== Campus ==
The dormitories had a capacity of about 180.
