= Randolph Academy Union Free School District =

School district in New York, United States

Randolph Academy Union Free School District is a school district which covers campuses of a residential and day institution with locations in Randolph and Hamburg in New York State. It is a "special act" school district that only includes specific institutions which provide services to children. The Randolph location includes both day and boarding students, while the Hamburg location only has day students.

== History ==
The Randolph Common School District #11 was created in the 1950s to provide educational services to the Randolph Children's Home. On June 4, 1985, the New York State Legislature created the current form of the school district.

In 2011 Randolph Academy acquired the Hopevale Inc. grade 7-12 school, which had been experiencing financial problems, in Hamburg. Accordingly, the Hopevale Union Free School District was dissolved on the orders of Governor of New York Andrew Cuomo, with Randolph Academy UFSD taking over. Randolph expanded the Hopevale campus to K-12 and kept it as only a day campus.

In six months in 2014, almost 33% of the people employed at Randolph Academy resigned. The school district hired a company in Texas to research the rationales behind the resignations. In 2015 a group of teachers criticized the superintendent and held a no confidence vote.

== Operations ==
The school districts of the family residences of the students fund Randolph Academy UFSD. The district does not have direct taxation.

The State of New York appoints two members of the board of trustees while Randolph Academy appoints the other five.

The Randolph campus has day and boarding programs and the Hamburg campus has day programs. New Directions Youth and Family Services operates the boarding program at Randolph.

== Campuses ==
The Hamburg campus has a school building built in 1992 and a gymnasium that pre-dates the school. The school had 42,000 square feet (3,900 m^{2}) of space, and the gymnasium had 5,700 square feet (530 m^{2}) of space.

== Student body ==
In 2015 the student count was 185.

== See also ==
- NYS Coalition of Special Act School Districts
- Greenburgh-Graham Union Free School District - Another special act school district in New York State
- List of boarding schools in the United States
- Boys Ranch Independent School District - A school district covering a residential home for children
- Masonic Home Independent School District - A school district covering a residential home for children
