= Greenburgh-Graham Union Free School District =

School district in New York State, United States

Greenburgh-Graham Union Free School District (GGUFSD) is a special act school district in Hastings-on-Hudson, New York. It teaches disabled and at risk students, with some of them living in a boarding facility. In 2017, its enrollment was 300.

It is divided into the following:

- Ziccolela (ZIC) Elem School
- Ziccolela Middle School
- Martin Luther King (MLK) High School

The district was established in 1967.

The district cooperated with the Graham Windham agency, which operated The Graham School. In 2020, about 120 people had jobs in the school. The school was scheduled to close in fall 2020. Jess Dannhauser, the CEO, stated that the school was going to close but that the COVID-19 pandemic in New York State accelerated the closure.

== See also ==
- NYS Coalition of Special Act School Districts
- Randolph Academy Union Free School District - Another special act school district
- Hopevale Union Free School District - A former special act school district
- Boys Ranch Independent School District - A school district covering a residential home for children
- Masonic Home Independent School District - A school district covering a residential home for children
