= LaQuan =

LaQuan or Laquan is a given name. Notable people with the name include:

- Laquan McDonald (1997–2014), American teenager murdered by the police
- LaQuan McGowan (born 1993), American football player
- LaQuan Nairn (born 1996), Bahamian long jumper
- LaQuan Smith (born 1988), American fashion designer
- LaQuan Stallworth, American basketball player
- Laquon Treadwell (born 1995), American football player
- LaQuan Williams (born 1988), American football player
