= Native American Preparatory School =

Former school in New Mexico, United States

Coordinates: 35.451°N 105.565°W

The Native American Preparatory School Inc. (NAPS) was a residential university preparatory school located in unincorporated San Miguel County, New Mexico, in proximity to South San Ysidro. The school had a Rowe PO Box. The school's website also listed an office in Santa Fe.

== History ==
The school originated from a summer program established by Cushing Academy, starting in 1988, being held in multiple locations.

In 1994 the owner of the land which housed NAPS, Larry Wilson, sold it to the entity that would establish the school.

Richard P. Ettinger Jr., son of the founder of Prentice Hall, established the school in 1995 with the goal of increasing the number of Native American students attending Ivy League colleges. The property had a cost of $6 million to develop. The school was the only intertribal, privately funded preparatory school for Native Americans in the United States.

Initially 50 students in grade 9 were enrolled; the school had plans to increase one grade level per year. Students caused a disturbance shortly after the beginning of instruction in 1995, which headmaster Norman E. Carey stated was due to being unaccustomed to significant homework. By November 1995, there were 40 students enrolled, and James Brooke of The New York Times stated that "many [...] expressed enthusiasm in interviews." By that month there were plans to attempt to raise $20,000,000.

By November 1998 its enrollment was up to 74. Its first graduation was to be held in June 1999. The graduating class was to have 22 students.

In 1998 the yearly cost to operate the school was $3,000,000. It had trouble raising the funds due to it not having a history of wealthy benefactors in the school community. The school closed in 2002 due to financial pressures. Its last graduating class had 12 students.

The property later became the Pecos River Ranch Retreat. It was put up for sale in 2014.

== Admissions ==
The school had to convince parents, who were skeptical of boarding schools due to past abuses at Native American boarding schools made for assimilation purposes, that this school had a different mission. The school saw many students being academically unprepared upon entering, despite almost all students having "B" or higher average grades in their prior transcripts, due to historic problems in education of Native Americans.

== Operations ==
The school had a $900 minimum tuition for a year, with, in 1998, 70% of the students paying that much and others paying more. That year almost all of the students had some sort of scholarship. Without scholarships the tuition per student per year would have been $16,000.

The school had study abroad and travel opportunities to get native American students familiar with non-Native cultures prior to them entering university.

== Campus ==
The school, on 1,600 acres (650 ha) of area, was located in proximity to Rowe, though a Federal Communications Commission (FCC) document identified it as not being in Rowe. The school was 35 miles (56 km) away from Santa Fe.

In 1998 Jane Salodof of The New York Times wrote that the school's telephone infrastructure was "inadequate" for its needs.

The school had dormitory facilities for its students.

== Demographics ==
The school was designed to house students nationwide, and was not intended to be a community school for the Rowe area.

In 1998 the students originated from 32 tribes. Headmaster Sven Husaby described the community as "almost like a Native American United Nations", referring to the various ethnic backgrounds. In 1997 the distance from families and rigor of the work had caused attrition in students unaccustomed to such.

In 1998 American Indians made up about 50% of the faculty.

== Curriculum ==
The school used a point of view from the American Indian during United States history classes.

== Notable alumni ==
- Adam Kokesh

== See also ==
- List of boarding schools in the United States
