= North Carolina School for the Blind and Deaf Dormitory =

Historic building in North Carolina, US

- U.S. National Register of Historic Places
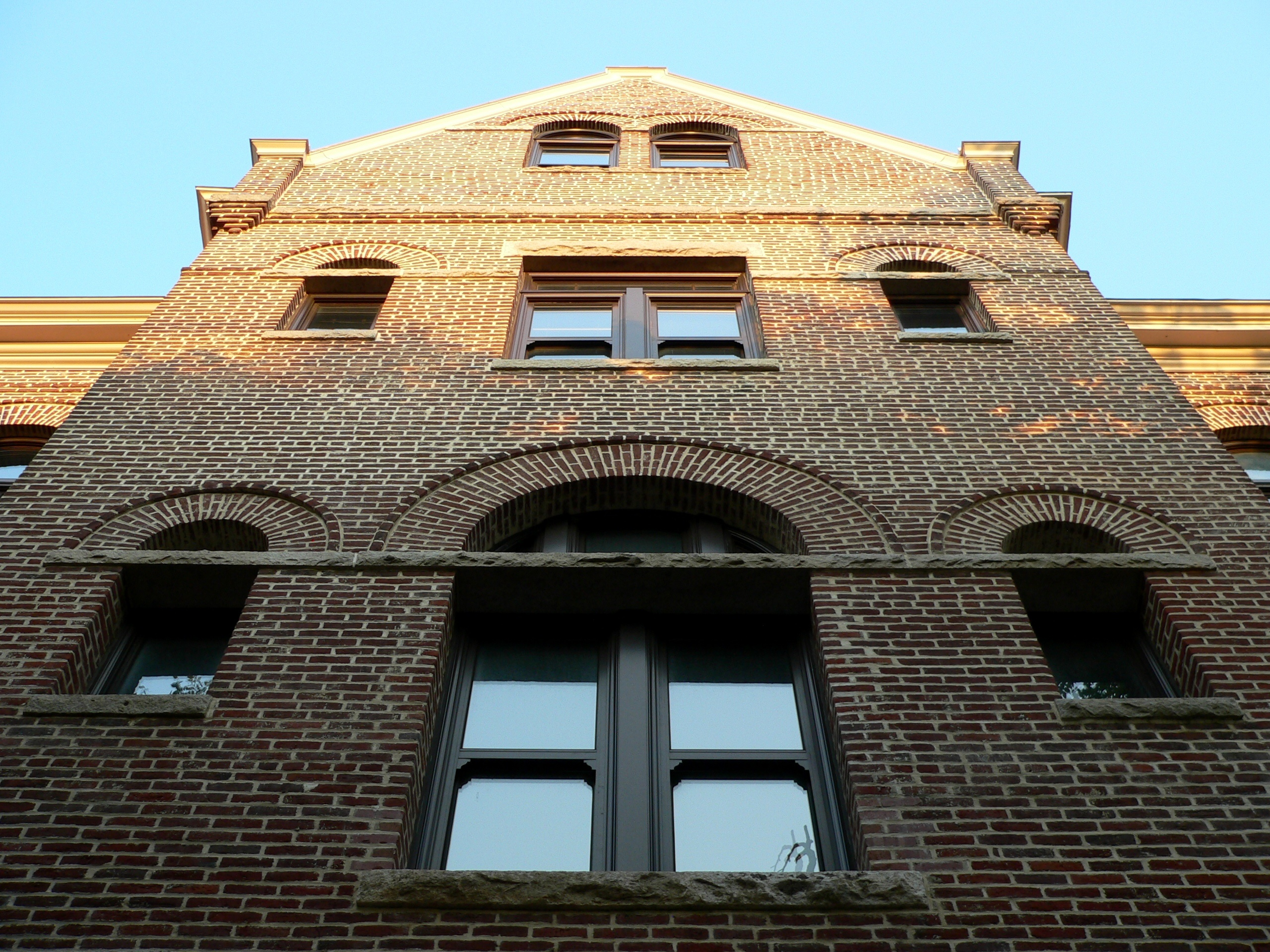
- North Carolina School for the Blind and Deaf Dormitory, September 2014

- Location within North Carolina Location within the United States
- Location: 216 W. Jones St., Raleigh, North Carolina
- Coordinates: 35°46′58″N 78°38′35″W
- Area: less than one acre
- Built: 1898
- Architect: Milburn, Frank P.
- Architectural style: Renaissance, Chateauesque
- NRHP reference No.: 76001343
- Added to NRHP: August 11, 1976

North Carolina School for the Blind and Deaf Dormitory, also known as the Old Health Building, is a historic dormitory building located at Raleigh, North Carolina. It was designed by the architect Frank Pierce Milburn and built in 1898. It is a 3 1/2-story, rectangular, red brick, Châteauesque-style building. It features a dramatic, towered dormered roofline and measures 104 feet wide and 85 feet deep. It consists of a rectangular block with parapeted gabled pavilions, three-story engaged towers, and a three-story rear wing. The building's main facade is symmetrical, dominated by a central entrance pavilion with a double door flanked by tall windows beneath arched parapets. A one-story masonry porch with square pillars and a second-level gallery with plain balustrade extends across the facade between the two corner towers. The original red brick has been painted grey, which diminishes the intended contrast between the smooth brick walls and the plentiful light grey stone trim. The stone trim frames both arched and trabeated window openings throughout, with arched openings outlined by a projecting brick course and trabeated ones accented by thick rough-cut stone lintels. The steep slate-covered hip roof is interrupted by projecting pavilion gables, polygonal tower roofs, and a series of small hip-roofed dormers (four on the front slope and five on the rear), with finials atop the dormers, towers and gables further enlivening the roofline. The interior features a system of halls (one longitudinal and two lateral) meeting at the center of the building beneath large round arches. It is the only remaining structure of the North Carolina School for the Blind and Deaf, now known as Governor Morehead School. After the school moved to a new location in 1923, the building housed state offices.

It was listed on the National Register of Historic Places in 1976.
