= Cascade School =

Defunct therapeutic boarding school in California, United States

Location
- 12069 Tintagel Ln, Whitmore; Shasta County, California 96096; 40°38′21.13″N 121°47′55.76″W

Information
- Type: Therapeutic boarding school
- Established: 1984
- Closed: January 20, 2004
- Age range: 13 to 18
- Campus size: 250 Arce
- Tuition: $51,000 in the year 2000

Cascade School was a therapeutic boarding school located in Shasta County, California.

== History ==
Cascade was founded in 1984 and enrolled students between the ages of 13 and 18 years, with a capacity for 120 students in Its final years.

Cascade School was accredited by the Western Association of Schools and Colleges.

In October 1985, five students went missing on a hike in Lassen County. Two helicopters took part in the search for the missing students.

In September 1998, 85 students and staff members were evacuated from the school due to a nearby forest fire that endangered the school.

The length of their therapeutic programs was between 18 and 23 months. During the program, students would take part in a series of eight therapeutic workshops. These eight workshops were called propheets and they lasted twenty-four hours.

In 2002, the school arranged a wilderness trip to the Warner Mountain District.

The Cascade School closed in January 2004. After closure, the campus was sold to Julian Youth Academy.

Cascade school is mentioned by Paris Hilton in her documentary This Is Paris in 2020.

== Notable alumni ==
- Paris Hilton
- Sean Wilsey
