= South Carolina Governor's School for Agriculture at John de la Howe =

Coordinates: 33.9564°N 82.4189°W

South Carolina Governor's School for Agriculture at John de la Howe (JDLH), formerly John de la Howe School (JDLHS), is a boarding high school in unincorporated McCormick County, South Carolina, with a McCormick postal address. As of 2025 it is the sole boarding school for agricultural professions in the United States.

== History ==
The first version of the school, an agricultural educational facility, was on property given to the South Carolina state government 1797. Its namesake was John de la Howe, a doctor from France. His property was turned into a school, and as per his will, its initial student body consisted of enrolled children without parents and guardians as well as those from low socioeconomic backgrounds. Howe's grave is on the property. It began operating as an educational institution in the 1830s.

It became an independent agency of the South Carolina state government in 1918.

In 1938 John de la Howe Hall was built.

In the 1980s, the state turned it into a boarding school for students who had behavioral problems. This followed a trend of phasing out orphanages in the United States.

In 2016 the school was no longer accredited. The school, in 2020, changed into being an agricultural high school. The school was no longer a disciplinary school partly because South Carolina school districts now had their own local alternative disciplinary programs. The initial enrollment of this new program was 33, due to issues from the COVID-19 pandemic in South Carolina. In the 2021-2022 school year, the enrollment was twice that of the previous school year.

In 2024 the school was accredited again, and it had 81 students that year. In 2025 the school had more applicants than slots available.

== Campus ==
Its campus has 1,310 acres (530 ha) of area. The property has around 12 dormitory facilities.

It is about 8 miles (13 km) northwest of McCormick.

== Program ==
When it was an alternative education campus for students with discipline problems, prior to the campus' conversion into an agricultural high school, the L.S. Brice School was the on-campus school for students in grades 6-12, while John de la Howe sent students in grades 11-12 to McCormick High School.

== See also ==
- List of boarding schools in the United States
