= Fred Hedrick =

American judge

Chief Judge of the North Carolina Court of Appeals
- In office 1984–1993

Personal details
- Born: Robert Alfred Hedrick; August 23, 1922
- Died: July 18, 2009 (aged 86)
- Party: Democratic
- Education: Governor Morehead School; University of North Carolina School of Law
- Profession: Lawyer, judge

Robert Alfred "Fred" Hedrick (August 23, 1922 - July 18, 2009) was an American jurist who served for 24 years on the North Carolina Court of Appeals.

Blinded at the age of 13, Hedrick graduated from the Governor Morehead School for the blind in 1943. He later graduated from the University of North Carolina School of Law and served as a prosecutor and judge in Iredell County, North Carolina. In 1969, then-governor Bob Scott appointed Hedrick to the state appeals court. He was elected by the voters in 1970 and re-elected several times thereafter. In 1974, he ran for the state supreme court but lost to James G. Exum of the Democratic primary. Hedrick served as chief judge of the Court of Appeals from 1984 until his retirement in 1993.

Hedrick's first female law clerk was Linda Stephens, who later became a judge of the North Carolina Court of Appeals. He also gave her away at her wedding, which was held in Hedrick's chambers.
