= NYS Coalition of 853 School Districts =

The New York State Coalition of 853 Schools was formed in 1991 to meet the growing needs of students with IEP diploma requirements. Today, the coalition meets the educational requirements of New York State on the grounds of agencies that provide various child welfare, juvenile justice, and family/community support services. These educational programs largely serve school-aged children involved in the foster care, juvenile justice and special education systems.

== New York State 853 Schools ==
853 schools have resulted from the continued privatization of many Special Act School Districts around the state. Many are modeled after non-profit agencies and corporations to uniquely serve students with severe disabilities outside of the regular educational setting. Each operates under a unified schoolbmember board of directors rather than multiple BOEs per each of the Special Act school districts, thus more cost efficient to operate. Below is a partial listing of all those educational organizations with 853 status:

- Anderson Center for Autism
- Astor Home For Children
- Baker Victory Services
- Cardinal Hayes Home
- The Center for Developmental Disabilities
- Center for Spectrum Services
- Child and Family Services
- Children's Home of Kingston
- Children's Home of Poughkeepsie
- Children's Home of Wyoming Conference
- Devereux Foundation
- Gateway-Longview
- Girls and Boys Town of New York
- Green Chimneys Children's Services
- Gustavus Adolphus
- Harmony Heights
- Hawthorne Country Day School
- Hillside Children's Center
- House of the Good Shepherd
- Julia Dyckman Andrus Memorial
- Lake Grove School
- LaSalle School
- Lincoln Hall
- Lowell School
- Mary Cariola Children's Center
- Maryhaven Center of Hope
- McQuade Children's Services
- New Directions Youth & Family Services
- Norman Howard School
- Northeast Parent & Child Society
- Oak Hill School, Inc.
- Parsons Child & Family Center
- Reece School for Special Training
- SCO Family of Services
- Springbrook
- St. Anne's Institute
- St. Catherine's Center for Children
- St. Colman's Home
- Saint Dominic's Family Services
- St. Joseph's Villa of Rochester
- Summit Children's Residence Center
- Vanderheyden Hall
- Westchester School for Special Children

== See also ==
- Lists of school districts in New York
- No Child Left Behind
