= NYS Coalition of Special Act School Districts =

The Coalition of Special Act School Districts is a support group for special act school districts operating in New York State. Its chief purpose is to facilitate the views of a branch of New York State public schools that adhere to the guidelines established by legislative special acts that created them to meet the unique needs of students falling under Title I D (neglected and delinquent minors) of NCLB and offer a full or partial residential placement while providing the educational needs of this struggling population. Many of the residents from these communities are assigned to these districts through the court system, committees on special education referrals and social service placements from nearby orphanages and group homes.

== Terminology ==
These districts are not considered charter schools but instead, completely state-funded public school districts. In addition, they are not the same as Private or State-Run schools. Each of the Special Act School Districts has its own Board of Education which convenes to regulate district policy and procedures.

== New York State Special Act school districts ==
There were originally 20 districts in all. Recent changes in state funding and budgetary reform have resulted in only nine special act school districts left to handle the needs of all special act student populations within New York State. They are as follows.

- Randolph Academy Union Free School District
- Berkshire Union Free School District
- Little Flower Union Free School District
- George Junior Republic Union Free School District
- Greenburgh Eleven Union Free School District
- Greenburgh-North Castle Union Free School District
- Hawthorne-Cedar Knolls Union Free School District
- Mount Pleasant-Cottage Union Free School District
- Mount Pleasant-Blythdale Union Free School District

Former districts:

- Greenburgh-Graham Union Free School District
- Hopevale Union Free School District

More than a few of the New York State Special Act Schools have closed since the 1980s. The Wiltwyk School(closed) was attended by Claude Brown, author of the 1965 best seller 'Manchild in the Promised land' which chronicled his time at the school. He credits The Wiltwyk school, overseen by the psychologist Ernst Papanek for his turnaround from juvenile delinquent to serious student and eventual work as mentor to young people in Newark.

The Special Act school districts generally have a small student to teacher ratio and counseling available to students. Many of these districts are closing and funding for the districts is limited.

== See also ==
- Lists of school districts in New York
- No Child Left Behind
