= Richard P. Ettinger Jr. =

Richard P. Ettinger Jr. (1925–1995) was an American publisher who founded the Native American Preparatory School.

Ettinger was born in 1925 in New York City to Richard P. Ettinger who co-founded Prentice-Hall.

He began his career at Prentice-Hall. At age 33, he founded Wadsworth Publishing in Belmont, California, which he sold in 1975 before retiring to Newport Beach, California.

Ettinger became more involved in philanthropy after inheriting $24 million from his father in 1971, which contributed to the family's Educational Foundation of America. As chairman of the foundation, he expanded his philanthropic efforts in 1984 when he orchestrated the sale of Prentice-Hall to Gulf & Western for $700 million, receiving a portion of the proceeds.

Influenced by the historical treatment of Native Americans, as described in Dee Brown's book Bury My Heart at Wounded Knee, Ettinger focused on improving conditions for Native American communities. He helped establish the Native American Preparatory School near South San Ysidro, New Mexico, in San Miguel County, which aimed to prepare Native American students for college while incorporating their cultural heritage into the curriculum. The school evolved from a summer program that began in 1988 and differed from historical boarding schools that sought to suppress Native American identity.

Ettinger died in 1995.
