= Montana Academy =

Coordinates: 48°06′18″N 114°52′36″W

Location
- 9705 Lost Prairie Road; Marion, Montana 59925; United States

Information
- Type: Private therapeutic boarding school
- Opened: 1997; 29 years ago
- Grades: 8–12
- Age range: 14–19
- Enrollment: 20-30
- Colors: Blue and White
- Mascot: Night Hawks
- Team name: Nigh Hawks
- Newspaper: Montana Academy Gazette or MAG
- Affiliations: NATSAP
- Website: www.montanaacademy.org

Montana Academy (Founded in 1997) was a small coeducational therapeutic boarding school in Marion, Montana with behavioral modification and academic programs. The school is for students age 14–19 (high school) and enrollment is generally around 30 students. They claim to combine clinicians, a therapeutic program, and a challenging prep school. In 2019, Montana Academy came under scrutiny due to a student death and was profiled as part of a media investigation into the lack of oversight at Montana boarding schools.

Montana Academy closed in 2021 and Embark Behavioral Health now runs a residential treatment center there.

== Campus ==
Montana Academy was located on Lost Horizon Ranch in a rural area of northwestern Montana, approximately 40 miles west of Kalispell. The campus comprised about 230 acres of pasture and forest.

Facilities included a main ranch house containing administrative offices and dining areas, a schoolhouse, a multipurpose barn with classrooms and a gymnasium, and student dormitories. Additional buildings included staff housing and instructional spaces.

The property included creeks, ponds, and areas used for outdoor and work-study activities.

== Program ==
Montana Academy combined academic instruction with a structured therapeutic program. According to the school’s materials, students participated in regular individual and group therapy sessions led by clinical staff.

The program organized students into groups for therapy and assigned mentors to support their progress. It also used a phased system, referred to as “clans,” to represent stages of development.

Students attended weekly individual therapy sessions in addition to group meetings, which were held multiple times per week.

== See also ==
- List of high schools in Montana
