= Logan River Academy =

Private, therapeutic boarding school in Logan, Utah, United States

Coordinates: 41.703397°N 111.8547997°W

Logan River Academy is a private boarding school serving students in grades 7-12 located in Logan, Utah, United States.

LRA is owned by the private equity firm Pharos Capital Group, LLC. Their CEO and founder is Kneeland Youngblood.

== The School ==
Logan River Academy has a capacity of approximately eighty students. Most students attending receive significant therapeutic counselling and support as part of their education program. The school also serves students on the higher functioning end of the autism spectrum.

== Tuition ==
The program's tuition is variable, depending on whether private or public money is being used for tuition. The treatment center bills separately for school, residential hours, and therapy sessions. However, tuition generally exceeds ten thousand U.S. dollars per month, and children generally stay at the program year-round.

== Licensing ==
Logan River Academy holds licensing as a residential treatment center through the Utah State Department of Human Services. as well as being a California certified non public school which allows California School Districts to directly place and fund students at the school as part of their FAPE obligations.

== Accreditation ==
=== Educational program accreditation ===
Logan River Academy's educational component is accredited through AdvancED. Logan River Academy's 2009 accreditation report states, "The facilities of Logan River Academy are commendable, and the school design is very beneficial to learning and teaching." As areas for potential improvement, the report notes unexplained high staff turnover and a lack of curriculum maps and of adequate individual student achievement data. The report also notes that the facility's educational programs did not provide adequate curriculum maps nor the desired amount of student achievement data, and that the school should work to reduce a high rate of staff turnover.

=== Residential program accreditation ===
Logan River Academy's residential treatment program is accredited by the Joint Commission (JCAHO) . The school also belongs to NATSAP, a non-accrediting membership organization that regulates standards on its member organizations. Logan River Academy is also licensed by the state of Utah as a residential treatment center.

== Sports ==
Although Logan River Academy formerly competed in sports, as of May 2020 it has no active sports teams or groups. In Winter 2014 the school had two basketball teams. In 2012, two Logan River Academy students were allowed to try out for a team at the local high school, but the Utah High School Activities Association did not allow them to play for the team because they had no parents or guardians residing in the district.

== Criticism ==
Logan River Academy has been the subject of a campaign of criticism led by Anonymous, which alleged that the school uses a form of solitary confinement on students. This is denied by the school, which says the allegations are "unfounded" and that there is "no basis for the allegations out there". Despite the denials, many former students have reported severe abuse and torture at the hands of school staff as part of the school's behavior modification techniques. Some have compared the abuse against students at the school to the treatment of detainees at Guantanamo Bay. The campaign against the school has used an online petition on change.org as well as campaigning on social media.

The school terminated some of the practices that were the subject of criticism. Among them was the practice of Development, or "Devo", a dormitory with stricter rules which has been described as "prolonged solitary confinement".

In addition to Anonymous, other groups have criticized the school over a variety of issues, such as the fact that many of the school's employees are not professionally licensed by the state of Utah. However, there is no requirement for licensing of general nonteacher/non-medical general support staff at residential treatment centers or other public schools.

To counter the harsh criticism the residential treatment center has received and abuse claims made by former residents, the school has published a website with a statement denying such abuse. In its statement, Logan River Academy's also claims it has never been involved in litigation regarding its care. However, in 2019, a former resident sued Logan River Academy, claiming that while under Logan River's care she had been "repeatedly sexually abused" by a Logan River employee.

Also in 2019, a female resident at Logan River, accused of molesting a younger student, pleaded no contest to three counts of misdemeanor sexual battery. She was sentenced to continue treatment at the center, among the other residents.
