= Hauʻula, Hawaii =

Census-designated place in Hawaii, United States

Hauʻula Hauula
- Census-designated place
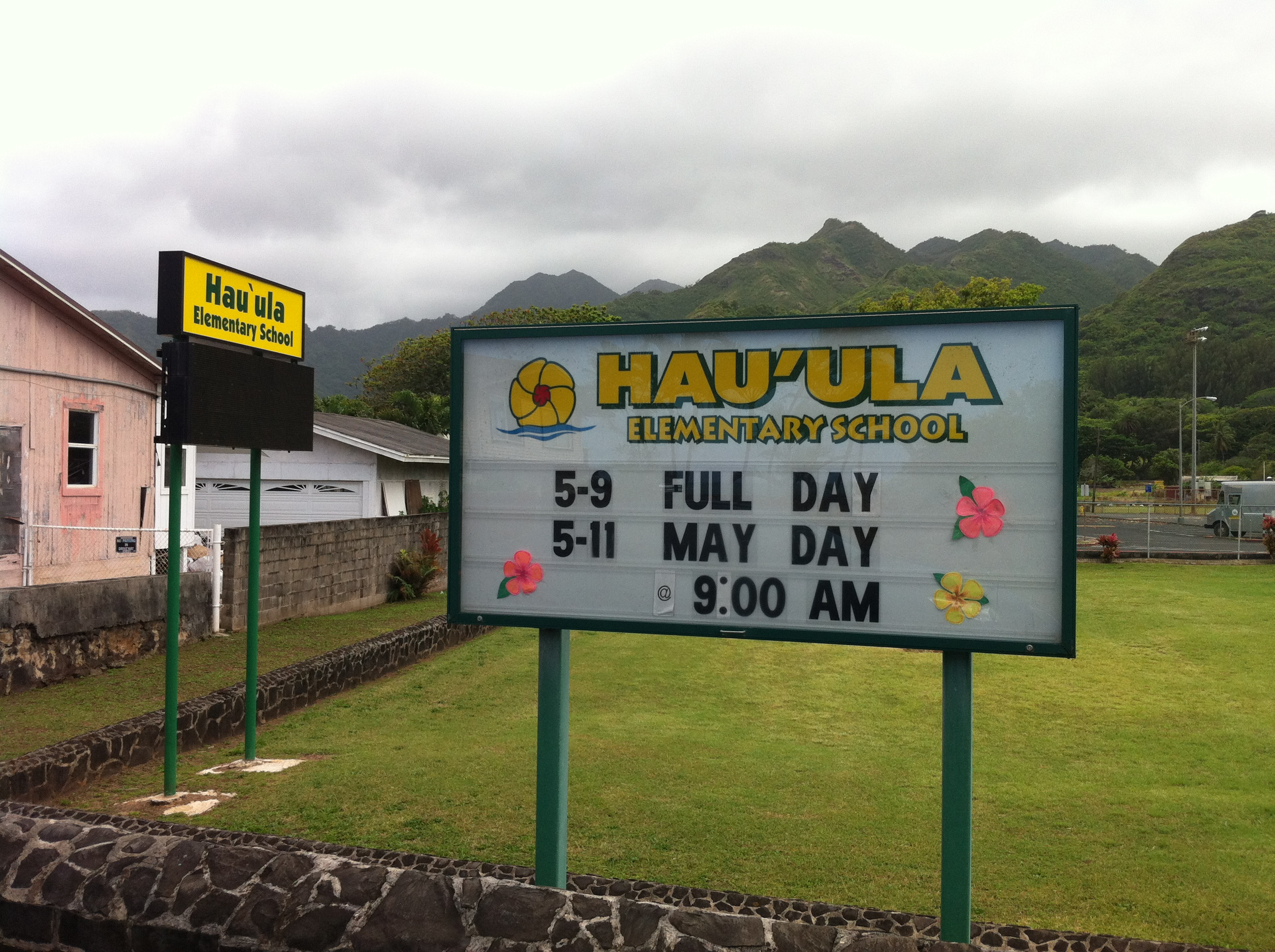
- Hauʻula Elementary

- Location in Honolulu County and the state of Hawaii
- Coordinates: 21°36′50″N 157°54′49″W
- Country: United States
- State: Hawaii

Area
  - Total: 1.93 sq mi (5.00 km^{2})
  - Land: 1.16 sq mi (3.00 km^{2})
  - Water: 0.77 sq mi (2.00 km^{2})
- Elevation: 7 ft (2.1 m)

Population (2020)
  - Total: 4,018
  - Density: 3,470.6/sq mi (1,340.02/km^{2})
- Time zone: UTC-10 (Hawaii-Aleutian)
- ZIP code: 96717
- Area code: 808
- FIPS code: 15-12400
- GNIS feature ID: 0359116

Hauʻula (Hawaiian pronunciation: [hɐwˈʔulə]) is a census-designated place and rural community in the Koʻolauloa District on the island of Oʻahu, City & County of Honolulu. In Hawaiian, hauʻula means "red hau" (hau is a type of tree: Hibiscus tiliaceus). There is a small commercial center. As of the 2020 census, the CDP population was 4,018.

A fringing reef extends off the shoreline. There are several beaches and beach parks in Hauʻula, including Hauʻula Beach Park, ʻAukai Beach Park, Kokololio Beach Park, and Mahakea Beach. Sugarcane was once grown along the narrow coastal plain inland from the highway.

The U.S. postal code for Hauʻula is 96717. There is a two-bay fire station located on Kamehameha Highway.

== Geography ==
Hauʻula is located at 21°36′50″N 157°54′49″W (21.613850, -157.913543). The town is located north of Punaluʻu and south of Lāʻie along Kamehameha Highway (State Rte. 83).

According to the United States Census Bureau, Hauʻula has a total area of 1.9 square miles (5.0 km^{2}). 1.2 square miles (3.0 km^{2}) of it is land, and 0.77 square miles (2.0 km^{2}) of it, or 40.56%, is water, referring to a part of the Pacific Ocean included in the census tract.

There are also hiking trails in Hauʻula. The 2.5 mile Hauʻula Loop trail that wraps along the side of the mountain, providing views of the coast and protecting reef. The trail head is also shared with the Ma'akau Gulch and the Ma'akau Ridge hikes.

=== Climate ===
Climate data for Hauʻula, Hawaii, 1991–2020 normals, extremes 1999–present
Month	Jan	Feb	Mar	Apr	May	Jun	Jul	Aug	Sep	Oct	Nov	Dec	Year
Record high °F (°C)	87 (31)	87 (31)	88 (31)	87 (31)	89 (32)	86 (30)	88 (31)	88 (31)	90 (32)	89 (32)	88 (31)	86 (30)	90 (32)
Mean daily maximum °F (°C)	78.7 (25.9)	78.5 (25.8)	78.4 (25.8)	79.7 (26.5)	81.7 (27.6)	82.9 (28.3)	84.1 (28.9)	84.5 (29.2)	85.0 (29.4)	83.9 (28.8)	81.2 (27.3)	79.7 (26.5)	81.5 (27.5)
Daily mean °F (°C)	72.5 (22.5)	72.7 (22.6)	72.8 (22.7)	74.6 (23.7)	76.0 (24.4)	78.2 (25.7)	79.0 (26.1)	79.7 (26.5)	79.8 (26.6)	78.7 (25.9)	76.4 (24.7)	73.9 (23.3)	76.2 (24.6)
Mean daily minimum °F (°C)	66.2 (19.0)	66.8 (19.3)	67.1 (19.5)	69.4 (20.8)	70.3 (21.3)	73.4 (23.0)	73.9 (23.3)	74.9 (23.8)	74.5 (23.6)	73.5 (23.1)	71.5 (21.9)	68.1 (20.1)	70.8 (21.6)
Record low °F (°C)	52 (11)	55 (13)	57 (14)	56 (13)	61 (16)	61 (16)	65 (18)	68 (20)	65 (18)	61 (16)	53 (12)	56 (13)	52 (11)
Average precipitation inches (mm)	4.54 (115)	5.31 (135)	5.55 (141)	3.57 (91)	3.35 (85)	2.47 (63)	3.27 (83)	3.25 (83)	3.78 (96)	3.82 (97)	5.97 (152)	5.90 (150)	50.78 (1,291)
Average precipitation days (≥ 0.01 in)	16.4	15.6	19.0	19.4	18.5	19.7	23.3	21.9	19.7	21.3	21.3	21.3	237.4
Source 1: NOAA
Source 2: National Weather Service

== Demographics ==
Historical population
Census	Pop.	Note	%±
2020	4,018		—
U.S. Decennial Census

As of the census of 2020, there were 4,018 people and 789 households residing in the CDP. The racial makeup of the CDP was 16.82% White, 0.77% African American, 0.36% Native American, 5.72% Asian, 37.44% Pacific Islander, 0.96% from other races, and 37.93% from two or more races. Hispanic or Latino of any race were 9.81% of the population. In 2010 the population density was 605.9 inhabitants per square mile (233.9/km^{2}). There were 1,020 housing units at an average density of 169.3 per square mile (65.4/km^{2}).

== Education ==
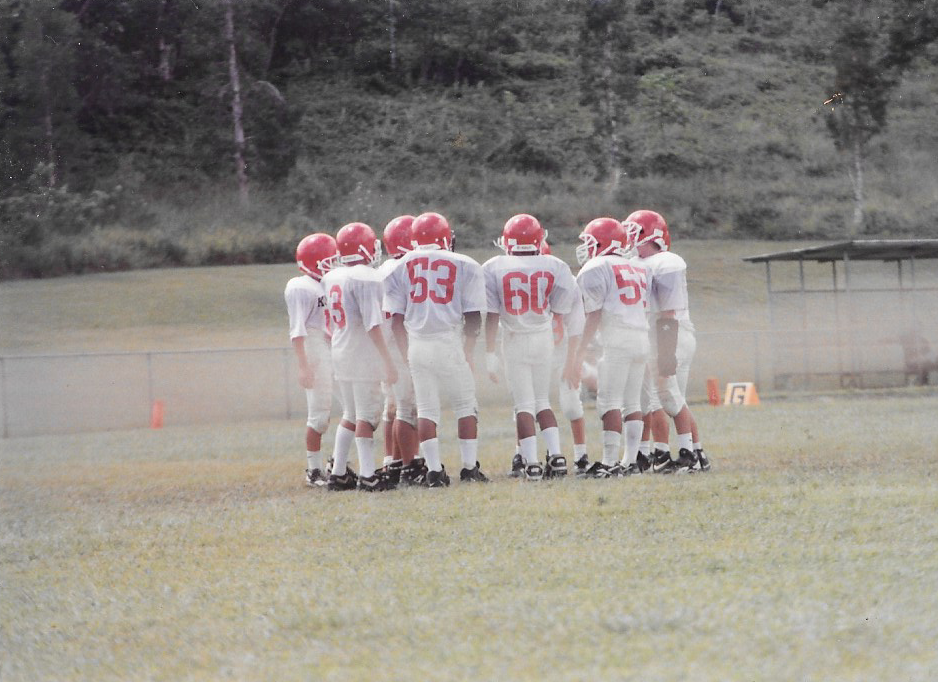
Football players of Hauʻula Elementary School

Hawaii Department of Education operates public schools, and Ke Kula Kaiapuni O Hauʻula, in Hauʻula. Asia Pacific International School Hawaii Campus offers private education from kindergarten to 12th grade, with boarding option from 5th grade onwards.
