= Secret Harbor School =

Location
- Skagit County, Washington; 48°33′4.56″N 122°41′38.76″W

Information
- Former name: Secret Harbor farm
- Type: Private
- Established: 1949
- Closed: 2000
- NCES School ID: 530015002753
- Age range: 11 to 18
- Website: https://web.archive.org/web/20010202130800/http://secretharbor.org/

The Secret Harbor School was a private boarding school on Cypress Island in Washington state.

== History ==
The original name was Secret Harbor Farms. Lillian Johnson and Thomas Gallagher founded the school.

In 1955, Secret Harbor Farms appealed to the Washington State Supreme Court as a defendant in a case centred around land access rights.

In 1974, in an article that ran in the Spokane Daily Chronicle, a youth from Michigan sued Secret Harbor Farms, alleging he was abused, denied medical attention, and claimed that the staff made him shovel raw sewage. The article mentioned no phone line reached the mainland.

In a 1976 article, the school mentioned that alumni came from places as diverse as Chicago, Los Angeles, Canada, France, and the Philippines.

In 1978, a judge warned the school to curb escape attempts due to 52 attempts over the prior three years.

In 1985 a resident escaped from the school by faking an injury to get off the island and running away from the hospital. Never caught.

In 1987, three 13-year-old residents attempted to escape from the school by stealing a 28-foot boat and sailing toward Guemes Island. After the vessel became disabled when lines fouled its propeller, they fired an emergency flare that prompted a U.S. Coast Guard search. The boat washed ashore on Guemes Island, and the boys later reached Anacortes by ferry, where they were detained by Skagit County sheriff's deputies and placed in juvenile detention.

In a 1990 kidnap and assault case, two school residents were charged with kidnapping and assaulting an employee. They had obtained a shotgun and pistol. They escaped on a power boat, but were later arrested.

After the school's closure, the island was unoccupied until it was sold in 2005. The new owners had ambitious plans that included turning it into a luxury resort and spa destination. However, due to local resistance, these plans did not happen.

In 2020, Michael J Moore wrote a book called Secret Harbor. It is about a school called Secret Harbor on an island in the San Juan Islands.

In 2023, the Seattle Times reported lawsuits against the school alleging child abuse in the 1980s and 1990s.
