= New Mexico School for the Arts =

Charter school in the United States

Coordinates: 35.6854°N 105.9476°W

New Mexico School for the Arts is a charter high school in the Santa Fe Railyard in Santa Fe, New Mexico.

== History ==
The New Mexico Legislature in 2008 passed a bill that allowed for the school to be created. The school opened in 2010 in a former Catholic elementary school.

It moved into its current facility in 2019. During the COVID-19 pandemic in New Mexico students used video recordings and altered dance routines to cope with new conditions.

== Operations ==
As of 2019 it is classified as a charter school, with the state chartering it, and has a six-person school board. That year the school asked the state government to reclassify it as a "special statewide residential public school" so it would no longer be a charter school, allowing it to have its own superintendent and a nine-person school board.

== Admissions ==
The school accepts students based on auditions, differing from lotteries used by most charter schools.

== Campus ==
The current campus previously was the Sanbusco Market Center, named after the defunct Santa Fe Business Company. Because classes were held virtually during the COVID-19 pandemic, the cafeteria's construction work began in 2020. Klinger Constructors of Albuquerque is the construction company. The Sanbusco Market Center was heavily renovated and new additions were constructed to expand the campus. Luchini Trujillo Structural Engineers was the structural engineer of record. Prior to 2020 the former paseo was an impromptu dining room.

== Dormitory ==
The dormitory is conveniently located on-site, and residential programs are available to students living 65 miles+ (5-day) or 165 miles+ (7-day) commuting distance away from the school.

== Transportation ==
Dormitory residents are expected to commute to school through Albuquerque's public transportation system.

== Curriculum ==
By 2020 the school was developing its creative writing program.
