= Boys Ranch, Texas =

Boys Ranch
- Unincorporated community & census-designated place
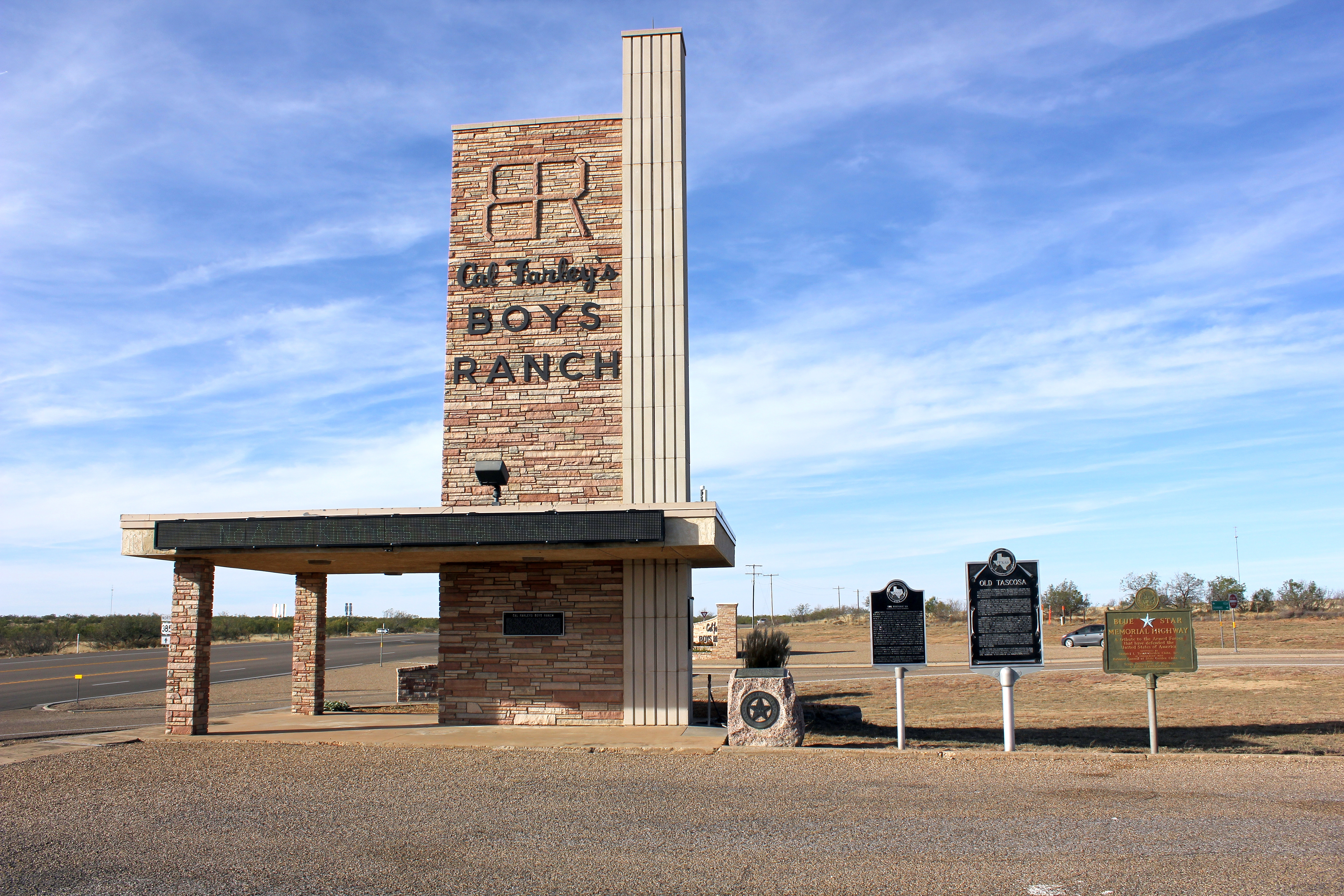

- Location within the state of Texas Boys Ranch (the United States)
- Coordinates: 35°32′00″N 102°15′00″W
- Country: United States
- State: Texas
- County: Oldham

Area
  - Total: 1.6 sq mi (4.1 km^{2})
  - Land: 1.6 sq mi (4.1 km^{2})
  - Water: 0 sq mi (0.0 km^{2})
- Elevation: 3,215 ft (980 m)

Population (2020)
  - Total: 173
  - Density: 110/sq mi (42/km^{2})
- Time zone: UTC-6 (Central (CST))
  - Summer (DST): UTC-5 (CDT)
- ZIP codes: 79010
- Area code: 806
- FIPS code: 48-09796
- GNIS feature ID: 2586911

Boys Ranch is a census-designated place and unincorporated community in northeastern Oldham County, Texas, United States, on the site of the original county seat, Tascosa. Founded in 1939 by Cal Farley, it lies along U.S. Route 385, northeast of the city of Vega, the county seat of Oldham County. Although Boys Ranch is unincorporated, it has a post office, with the ZIP code of 79010. Boys Ranch is a residential community serving boys and girls ages 5 to 18.

As of the 2020 census, Boys Ranch had a population of 173.

== History ==
The Boys Ranch was founded in 1939 by Cal Farley (December 25, 1895 – February 19, 1967) for troubled youth and is now a census-designated place. This was a new CDP for the 2010 census with a population of 282.

Farley was a native of Sexton, Iowa, the son of Frank and Jennie Farley, who later moved to a farm outside of Elmore, Minnesota. He made his way to Amarillo in 1923. He was noted for his role in the professional wrestling business, particularly working with Dory Funk and the Luxembourg born Dutch Mantel.

== Education ==
The central part of the Boys Ranch CDP is within the Boys Ranch Independent School District, containing Boys Ranch High School, Mimi Farley Elementary School, and Blakemore Middle School.

The outer edges of the CDP are within the Channing Independent School District.

== Demographics ==
Historical population
Census	Pop.	Note	%±
2010	282		—
2020	173		−38.7%
U.S. Decennial Census; 2010 2020

Boys Ranch first appeared as a census designated place in the 2010 U.S. census.

Boys Ranch CDP, Texas – Racial and ethnic composition Note: the US Census treats Hispanic/Latino as an ethnic category. This table excludes Latinos from the racial categories and assigns them to a separate category. Hispanics/Latinos may be of any race.
Race / Ethnicity (NH = Non-Hispanic)	Pop 2010	Pop 2020	% 2010	% 2020
White alone (NH)	229	108	81.21%	62.43%
Black or African American alone (NH)	17	24	6.03%	13.87%
Native American or Alaska Native alone (NH)	5	0	1.77%	0.00%
Asian alone (NH)	0	1	0.00%	0.58%
Native Hawaiian or Pacific Islander alone (NH)	0	0	0.00%	0.00%
Other race alone (NH)	0	0	0.00%	0.00%
Mixed race or Multiracial (NH)	1	7	0.35%	4.05%
Hispanic or Latino (any race)	30	33	10.64%	19.08%
Total	282	173	100.00%	100.00%
