= Academy for Global Exploration =

- Ashland, OR; United States

Information
- Type: Private, boarding, traveling enrollment = 12 per destination
- Motto: The world is our classroom
- Established: 2002
- Head of School: Greg Guevara
- Average class size: 3 students campus = 80 acres (320,000 m^{2}), international
- Student to teacher ratio: 3:1
- Slogan: What did you learn at school today?
- Athletics: Skiing, snowboarding, rock climbing, bouldering, kayaking, surfing, backpacking, camping
- Website: www.agexplore.org

Academy for Global Exploration (AGE) is a college preparatory school traveling high school for grades 9 through 12 based in Ashland, Oregon, United States. AGE spends half of each semester overseas in such countries as Greece, Japan, South Africa, Nicaragua, Costa Rica, Peru and others.

== Overview ==
=== Basic information ===
Academy for Global Exploration is a traveling high school spending approximately half of the academic year abroad. When in residence in the United States, AGE is located in Ashland, Oregon. AGE's Southern Oregon base camp is the 81-acre (330,000 m^{2}) Valley View Ranch located 10 minutes from downtown Ashland.

=== Academic overview ===
Academy for Global Exploration's accredited curriculum is aligned around the Oregon Content Standards and the guidelines set forth by the Northwest Association of Accredited Schools. While traveling, students interact with local cultures and visit museums, theaters, historical sites, and geographic areas. While in Ashland, AGE students have access to the Southern Oregon University Library as well as the Ashland Public Library.

AGE maintains a 3:1 student-teacher ratio, assessing their progress through traditional and alternative methods of testing, and also through regular writing opportunities, presentations and discussions. Students have around-the-clock access to their teachers.

The academic calendar is based on a two-semester model, with each semester sixteen weeks long. Classes are held five days a week using a rotating daily schedule (block schedule). Weekends sometimes involve travel from one site to another.

=== International travel ===
Each semester Academy for Global Exploration spends eight weeks visiting a different international destination. Students learn from and about other cultures, and have the opportunity to participate in adventure sports. While on expedition, students and faculty travel together and the normal academic schedule is maintained. Homestays, cultural events, school visitations, and community service projects are incorporated into each semester's curriculum and itinerary.

=== Cultural studies ===
Each semester, all students at AGE take AGE's Cultural Studies class, co-taught by all AGE faculty members, as well as the students. The course content is a blend of process-oriented and country-specific topic lessons.

=== Outdoor adventure ===
AGE's Outdoor Education program promotes outdoor activities that vary from rock climbing and bouldering, to skiing, surfing, and kayaking. Fitness is developed and maintained through daily strength training and cardiovascular workouts, as well as through cooperative sports and outdoor challenges.

=== Sample semesters ===
- Rock climbing in Kalymnos, Nafplio, and the Peloponnesus Peninsula in Greece;
- Surfing down the Pacific Coast of Nicaragua, Costa Rica and Panama;
- Skiing and snowboarding on the islands of Honshu and Hokkaido in Japan;
- Kayaking the rivers of Northern and Central Costa Rica;
- Bouldering and rock climbing in Rocklands and Montagu, South Africa.

=== Admissions and enrollment ===
Academy for Global Exploration accepts students in grades 9 through 12 as well as one year of post graduate study. AGE operates on a rolling admissions basis.

=== Academic requirements and credits ===
Students must enroll in a minimum of five academic classes per semester and cannot enroll in more than seven. Students are awarded a 1/2 credit per semester upon successful completion of course requirements (full-year courses are awarded one credit). By assigning credits in this way, AGE aligns with the Northwest Association of Accredited schools, the Oregon State Education system as well as most US school systems. AGE requires a minimum of 25 credits for a standard diploma. As a college preparatory program, AGE models its distribution and graduation requirements around the general expectations of colleges and universities.
