= Upper Columbia Academy =

Coordinates: 47.413336°N 117.367576°W

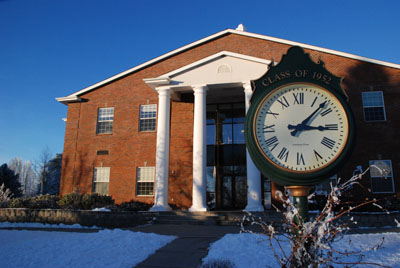

Location
- 3025 E Spangle Waverly Road; Spangle, Washington 99031; United States

Information
- Type: Private, College-prep, Day and boarding
- Motto: "I have no greater joy than to hear that my children walk in truth" (3 John 4)
- Denomination: Seventh-day Adventist
- Established: 1945
- Principal: Jeff Deming
- Grades: 9–12
- Gender: Coeducational
- Enrollment: 272
- Campus: Rural
- Colors: Black and Gold
- Mascot: Lion
- Nickname: UCA
- Website: www.ucaa.org

Upper Columbia Academy (UCA) is a 9-12 boarding high school located in Spangle, Washington, United States.

About 20 miles (32 km) south of Spokane, it is owned and operated by the Seventh-day Adventist Church. It is a part of the Seventh-day Adventist education system, the world's second largest Christian school system.

== History ==
Upper Columbia Academy's predecessor was Yakima Valley Academy. That original school closed in 1945 due to lack of space and physical plant problems - walls were held together by metal cables mounted on both sides of the rooms. The school had to find a bigger place and Pastor Mote was empowered by the church leadership to spend no more than $100,000 for a school. Pastor Mote came to the auction for the old poor farm in Spangle, but the minimum opening bid was over his limit. He told the auctioneer that he couldn't bid, so minimum opening bid was lowered to $100,000. Pastor Mote's was the only bid and the property was purchased, along with 15 hogs that they sold for $1500 to provide operating capital for the first year of school.

== Athletics ==
Upper Columbia Academy has six varsity sports teams. Men's Soccer, women's volleyball, men's and woman's basketball, and men's and woman's golf. Men's soccer has experienced some success placing 4th at the 2017 Walla Walla University fall classic tournament, and finishing 2nd at the Union college invitational. In 2018, the soccer team made it to the championship game at Fall Classic and the 3rd place game at the Union College Invitational. The men's Basketball team has been consistently good, boasting a positive win to loss ratio. At the 2018 Walla Walla University friendship tournament, the men's basketball team took 1st, never going down at any point throughout the entire tournament. In Golf, both Blake Johnson and Evan Pierce made the 2018 state tournament.

== See also ==
- List of Seventh-day Adventist secondary schools
- Seventh-day Adventist education
