= The Ridge RTC =

Therapeutic boarding school in Milton, New Hampshire, United States

Coordinates: 43°26′38″N 71°03′04″W

Ridge RTC
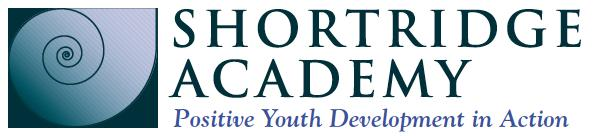

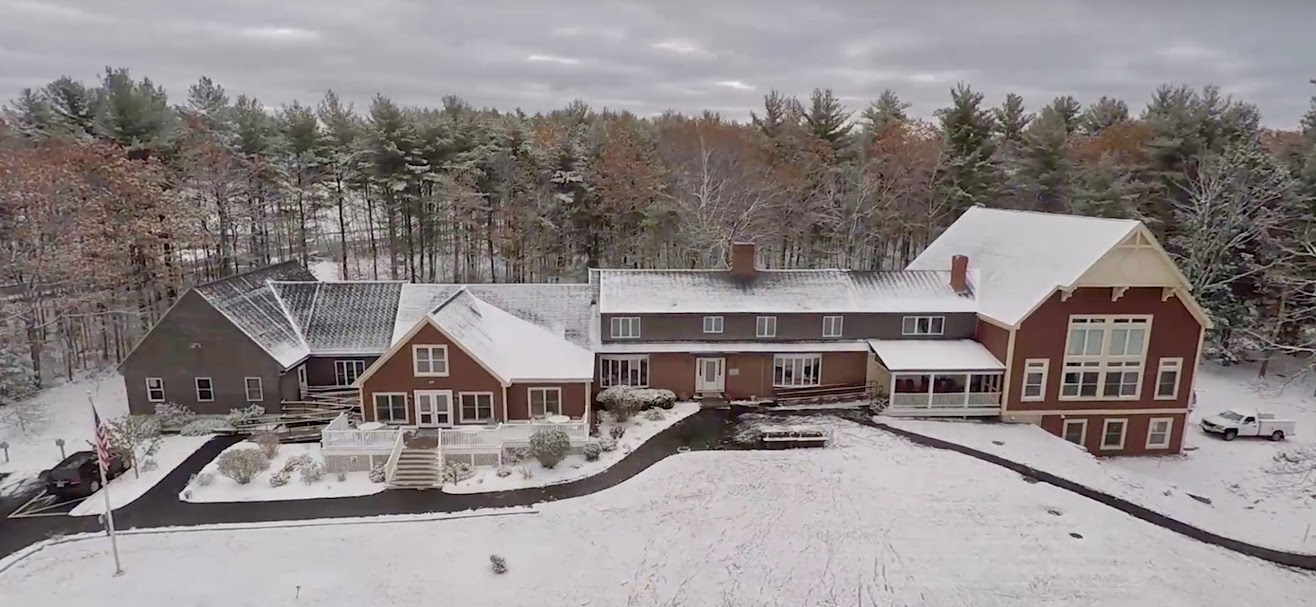

Location
- 619 Governors Rd; Milton, New Hampshire; United States

Information
- Former name: Shortridge Academy
- Type: Residential Treatment Center
- Established: 2002
- Academic Director: Anne Downey
- Executive Director/Founder: Adam Rainer
- Campus: Rural
- Website: shortridgeacademy.com

The Ridge RTC is a year-round residential treatment center located in Milton, New Hampshire. Previously known as Shortridge Academy, it was acquired by Altior Healthcare and Pine Tree Equity Partners.

== History ==
Shortridge Academy was a therapeutic boarding school founded by Adam Rainer in 2002. It operated as Shortridge Academy until 2023 when it was acquired by Altior Healthcare who rebranded it to The Ridge.
