= Shree Diamond Public Academy =

School in Nepal

Information
- Established: 1996; 30 years ago
- Founder: Hira Chand

The Shree Diamond Public Academy Higher Secondary School is a school in Gaddachauki, Nepal. It was founded in 1996 by Hira Chand when he was just 16 years old. At that time there was no English medium school in Gaddachauki.
