= Oaklawn Academy =

Boarding school

Coordinates: 42°52′20.4″N 89°01′01.1″W

Oaklawn Academy is a boarding school. It was founded by the Legion of Christ, an organization founded by the Mexican priest, Marcial Maciel.

Originally situated in Cheshire, Connecticut, the academy moved, in 1986, to Edgerton, Wisconsin, both United States, in a rural area on the shore of Lake Koshkonong, 25 miles from Madison, Wisconsin, and approximately two hours north of Chicago.
