= Hopevale Union Free School District =

School district in New York, United States

Hopevale Union Free School District was a school district covering a single educational institution in Hamburg, New York. Hopevale Inc., a social services agency, maintained a residential and day institution for students in grades 7-12 who had difficulty in mainstream educational environments.

It was affiliated with Erie 1 BOCES.

== History ==
Sisters of Our Lady of Charity created a women's orphan and care facility in Buffalo, New York in 1855. This evolved to Hopevale, Inc. The school occupied its campus in Hamburg in 1971. The New York State Legislature created a "Special Act Public School District" to provide educational services. The school continued to take only girls as boarders, but its day services at Hamburg were co-gender. The final school building was built in 1992. The district retained the older gymnasium facility.

By 2010 the number of students attending Hopevale had declined. In December 2010 Hopevale Inc. announced it was closing. Originally the school was to close effective December 24.

While Hopevale Inc. had closed in December and had ended the boarding program, causing enrollment to drop from 125 to 85, the day school ultimately stayed open for the remainder of the school year and was to be absorbed by Randolph Academy (affiliated with the Randolph Academy Union Free School District), which took over its campus. In 2011 Hopevale UFSD was dissolved on the orders of Governor of New York Andrew Cuomo.

== Campus ==
The Hopevale UFSD school post-1992 had 42,000 square feet (3,900 m^{2}) of space, and the gymnasium had 5,700 square feet (530 m^{2}) of space.

== Student body ==
Students typically had short term periods studying at Hopevale, typically a year to a year and two months.

== See also ==
- List of boarding schools in the United States
- Greenburgh-Graham Union Free School District - Another special act school district
