= Tennessee Governor's Academy for Math and Science =

Tennessee Governor's Academy for Mathematics and Science (TGA)

Location
- Knoxville, Tennessee; United States; 35.9592°N 83.8799°W

Information
- Type: Public Residential
- Motto: Latin: Veni, Vidi, Duci. English: I came; I saw; I calculated.
- Established: 2007
- School district: Knox County
- Staff: Six residence hall directors
- Faculty: About 10
- Enrollment: 22 seniors
- Colors: Crimson and silver
- Mascot: Spartan
- Affiliations: University of Tennessee at Knoxville
- Website: tga.tennessee.edu

The Tennessee Governor's Academy for Mathematics and Science, commonly Tennessee Governor's Academy or TGA, was a residential high school located in Knoxville, Tennessee on the campus of The Tennessee School for the Deaf (TSD). It was founded in 2007 by Governor Phil Bredesen as part of an effort to provide challenges for students across the academic spectrum. Its inaugural class consisted of 24 high school juniors from throughout the state. The academy was closed on May 31, 2011, due to lack of state funding.

== Curriculum ==
=== Pre-Calculus ===
Pre-Calculus served as the introductory mathematics class at TGA for those who had not taken the course elsewhere or those who are not prepared to take Calculus upon arrival at TGA. The course was similar in content to the Math 130 course offered at the University of Tennessee at Knoxville. Generally speaking, the course content serves to prepare juniors to take Calculus during the Spring semester of the junior year. Content includes a review of algebraic, logarithmic, exponential, and trigonometric functions.

=== Calculus ===
The calculus course was designed by professors at the University of Tennessee at Knoxville and based on Math 141 for the first semester and Math 142 for the second semester of the TGA calculus course.

=== Mathematics for the Life Sciences ===
Mathematics for the Life Sciences, commonly MLS, was designed by professors at the University of Tennessee at Knoxville and based on Math 151. MLS provided an introduction to a variety of mathematical topics of use in analyzing problems arising in the biological sciences.

=== Physics ===
Also designed by university professors, this course was modeled on Physics 135, an introduction to Physics for Math and Physical Science Majors at the university. The course was calculus-based, but because most students entering TGA had no prior knowledge of calculus, began with topics for which the calculus is either unnecessary, not required by the curriculum set by the state, or easily taught around.

=== Humanities ===
At TGA, the Humanities course was designed to fulfill the requirements for the curriculum of the State of Tennessee for American History and English III.

== Student life ==
=== Cottage life ===
The students at the Tennessee Governor's Academy lived in cottages on the Tennessee School for the Deaf campus. The facilities were furnished by the University of Tennessee and the State. Each cottage consists of six student rooms and two hall director rooms. The cottage is divided into two wings, each consisting of three bedrooms which are shared by two students each. Each cottage has a full kitchen, dining area, classroom, and living room, and classes are held in the cottages.

=== House system ===
During the early first semester, the students were divided into four "houses," modeled after residential housing systems. TGA's houses were named Copernicus, Divinitus, Illuminati, and Renaissance, and each was headed by a hall director or assistant hall director. Though meant to be a long lasting legacy, the housing system served only as a temporary chore-organizing plan.

Over the 2007/08 winter break, a change in housing staff caused the house system to be reformed from four to three houses, each with new leadership. At the beginning of the 2008/09 school year, the house system (along with most of the structure of TGA) was completely reorganized. The teachers assigned the names to the houses, which are all named for deceased mathematicians or scientists: Cannon, Drew, Von Neumann, and Tesla.
