= Boys Ranch High School =

Location
- 27 Julian Bivins Blvd; Boys Ranch, Texas 79010-0219; United States; 35°31′53″N 102°15′4″W

Information
- School type: Public high school
- School district: Boys Ranch Independent School District
- Principal: Jennifer Mott
- Teaching staff: 25.92 (FTE)
- Grades: 9-12
- Enrollment: 93 (2023–2024)
- Student to teacher ratio: 3.59
- Colors: Blue & Gold
- Athletics conference: UIL Class A
- Mascot: Roughrider
- Website: Boys Ranch High School website

Boys Ranch High School is a public high school located in the Texas Panhandle, 37 miles northwest of Amarillo, Texas and classified as a 1A school by the UIL. The school is a part of the Boys Ranch Independent School District located at Cal Farley's Boys Ranch. The school is not rated by the Texas Education Agency, and has not been since 2013.

== Athletics ==
The Boys Ranch Roughriders compete in the following sports

Cross Country, Six-man Football, Basketball, Wrestling, Tennis, Rodeo, Track & Baseball.

=== State titles ===
- Boys Cross Country
  - 1984(3A), 1987(3A), 1988(2A), 1989(2A), 1991(2A), 1993(3A), 1996(2A), 2005(2A), 2011(1A)
- One Act Play
  - 1977(2A), 1979(2A), 1991(2A)

== Notable alumni ==
- Bill Sarpalius, American politician
