= River View Christian Academy =

Boarding school in Texas, United States

Location
- 6019 County Road; Lexington, Lee County, Texas 78947; 30°25′3.63″N 97°10′35″W

Information
- Former name: Julian Youth Academy
- Founded: 1993
- Founder: Phil Ludwig
- Website: riverviewchristianacademy.org

River View Christian Academy (RVCA), formerly known as Julian Youth Academy, is a private Christian boarding school for girls that has operated in Texas and California. Founded in 1993 by Phil Ludwig, the school has been affiliated with Teen Rescue, Inc. and has offered residential education and behavioral programs for adolescents.

== History ==
In 2003, a fire destroyed the campus, after which the owners became involved in legal disputes with San Diego County while seeking to rebuild.

The school was mentioned in an October 2007 hearing conducted by the United States Government Accountability Office.

Former campus location

In 2009, the program relocated to the former Cascade School campus in Shasta County under a lease agreement.

In 2011 a mummified baby was found on the campus in Shasta County. It belonged to a staff member, who told the police that she had not fed the baby when it was born.

Julian Youth Academy now operates as River View Christian Academy.

In 2016, California enacted the Community Care Facilities Act, which required certain residential programs, including River View Christian Academy, to obtain a Community Care License from the state. The school had previously operated under an exemption. After the owner, Phil Ludwig, declined to pay accumulating daily fines of $200 for noncompliance, a warrant was issued on January 8, 2019.

The facility has been said to provide conversion therapy to children who are gay, lesbian or bisexual. It has been alleged that the facility has punished these children. Californian authorities were investigating the school for these reasons in 2019, and considering closing it.
