= Asia Pacific International School =

Private school in Seoul, South Korea and Hauula, Hawaii

Coordinates: 37°37′54.5″N 127°03′01.8″E

- 아시아퍼시픽국제외국인학교

- Seoul and Hauula, Hawaii; South Korea, United States

Information
- Type: Private School
- Religious affiliation: Christianity
- Established: 2007
- Director: Euysung Kim
- Grades: K-12
- Enrollment: 230
- Campuses: Seoul, Hawaii
- Athletics conference: KAIAC
- Mascot: Greenhawk
- Accreditation: WASC
- Website: apis.org

Asia Pacific International School (APIS, Korean: 아시아퍼시픽국제외국인학교) is a private, non-profit K-12 school accredited by the Western Association of Schools and Colleges (WASC). APIS has a global network of campuses under one school — East Asia campus in Seoul, the capital of South Korea, and campus of the West in North Shore, Hauʻula, Hawaii.

APIS Seoul campus has more than 45 fully qualified teachers. The school has a student-to-teacher ratio of 5.5:1. There are currently about 230 students enrolled at Asia Pacific International School Seoul Campus. For APIS Hawaii campus, it has more than 20 fully qualified teachers. The campus has a student-to-teacher ratio of 3.5:1.

APIS' curriculum puts focus on project-based learning (PBL). For high school students, APIS Seoul campus also offers AP curriculum as well as AP tests. APIS also utilizes advisory program as an integral part of education.

== Facilities ==
The APIS Seoul campus is located in northeastern Seoul (Nowon District). APIS classrooms and administrative offices are located in the main building. In addition to classrooms, the campus includes a small auditorium, children's playground, athletic field, gymnasium, music practice rooms, fitness center, and a professional recording studio.

APIS Hawaii campus is located on a 97-acre campus in Hauula in North Shore area of Oahu island. Hawaii campus offers a boarding option at its dormitory for Grade 5-12.

== College matriculation ==
Since its first class graduated in 2012, 100% of students have moved onto 4-year universities and colleges, mostly in the United States. Recent graduates have matriculated to universities such as Stanford University, Harvard University, Yale University, Northwestern University, Dartmouth College, Brown University, Cornell University, University of Pennsylvania, Massachusetts Institute of Technology, Duke University, Johns Hopkins University, New York University, Carnegie Mellon University, Wellesley College, Berklee College of Music, and Rhode Island School of Design.

== Extracurricular activities ==
Extracurricular activities in Seoul Campus include various academic, art, and sports activities. In Middle and High School levels, APIS competes in KAIAC along with other international schools and DoD (US Department of Defense) schools in Korea.

- Middle School Activities (Soccer, Volleyball, Basketball, AQT)
- High School Activities (Soccer, Volleyball, Basketball, Table Tennis, Cross Country, Forensics)

== Student clubs ==
Student clubs activities are offered at high school. As of Fall 2017, approved clubs at APIS Seoul Campus include:

APIS Publishers Club, APIS Business Club, BTY Club, Model United Nations, Science Olympiad Lab, Table Tennis Club, THEIA, Hawksnest (Morning Announcement), Emergency Life Support, The APIS Meme Team, Helping Hands for Children, Liberty in North Korea, National History Day Club, The Computists, Poor Animals In Need, Beyond School, Spanish Club - Club de Español, Deaf-ine, Mock Trial, APIS Math Club, Human Rights in South Korea, Nature Inquiry

== Events ==
Athletics/Extracurricular Activities Award Ceremony, Carnival, Christmas Concert, Elementary Field Day, End-of-Year Concert, Foreign Language Speech Contest, High School Drama, Prom, Spirit Week, KIMEA Solo/Ensemble Festival, Korean Writing Contest, Middle School Lock-in, Middle School Speech Contest, Pacific Pencil Publishing Party, Publishing Parties, Spring Concert, Student Club Bazaar, Summer Reading Club, Talent Show, 30-Hour Famine, Write Across. Not all events are held each school year.

== Membership ==
Asia Pacific International School is a member of NAIS (National Association of Independent Schools), AAIE (Association for the Advancement of International Education), EARCOS (East Asia Regional Council of Overseas Schools). Asia Pacific International School Seoul campus is also a member of AMCHAM (American Chamber of Commerce in Korea), while Hawaii campus is a member of HAIS (Hawaii Association of Independent Schools) and TABS (The Association of Boarding Schools).
