= Boys Ranch Independent School District =

Public school

Location
- 163 River Rd. Boys Ranch, Texas USA
- Coordinates: 35°31′55″N 102°15′22″W

District information
- Type: Independent school district
- Grades: Pre-K through 12
- Superintendent: Kenneth Brown
- Schools: 3
- NCES District ID: 4811040

Students and staff
- Students: 148 (2024-25)
- Teachers: 39.07 (2024-25)
- Student–teacher ratio: 3.79 (2024-25)
- Athletic conference: UIL Class 1A Football Division I, Class 2A all other sports
- District mascot: Roughriders
- Colors: Blue, Gold

Other information
- Website: Boys Ranch ISD

Boys Ranch Independent School District is a public school district in Oldham County, Texas (USA).The district includes most of the Boys Ranch census-designated place.

== Schools ==
The district operates three schools.

- Boys Ranch High School (Grades 9-12)
- Blakemore Middle School (Grades 6-8)
- Mimi Farley Elementary School (Grades K-5)

== Special programs ==
=== Athletics ===
Boys Ranch High School participates in boys' baseball, basketball, six-man football, and wrestling, and girls' basketball. It currently plays in UIL 2A in all sports besides football, where it plays in 1A.

== See also ==
- List of school districts in Texas
- List of high schools in Texas
- List of boarding schools in the United States
