= Spangle, Washington =

- City
- Location of Spangle, Washington
- Coordinates: 47°25′49″N 117°22′39″W
- Country: United States
- State: Washington
- County: Spokane

Government
  - Type: Mayor–council
  - Mayor: Melissa Holling

Area
  - Total: 0.35 sq mi (0.91 km^{2})
  - Land: 0.35 sq mi (0.91 km^{2})
  - Water: 0 sq mi (0.00 km^{2})
- Elevation: 2,435 ft (742 m)

Population (2020)
  - Total: 280
  - Density: 800/sq mi (310/km^{2})
- Time zone: UTC-8 (Pacific (PST))
  - Summer (DST): UTC-7 (PDT)
- ZIP code: 99031
- Area code: 509
- FIPS code: 53-66290
- GNIS feature ID: 2413311
- Website: www.spanglewa.com

Spangle is a city in Spokane County, Washington, United States. The population was 280 at the 2020 census. The name comes from William Spangle, an early pioneer.

== History ==
Spangle was first settled in 1872 by William Spangle, an Illinois Civil War veteran who served in the army of General Tecumseh Sherman. He bought out the claim of an earlier squatter and established a stage station, a post office, and a blacksmith shop. The townsite was platted in 1879. It was incorporated in 1888.

== Geography ==
According to the United States Census Bureau, the city has a total area of 0.36 square miles (0.93 km^{2}), all of it land.

Spangle is 18 miles south of Downtown Spokane along US Route 195, an important north–south highway. The highway used to run through town, however a re-alignment of 195 by-passed it and several other small towns. The old highway is still open between Spangle and Rosalia, 14 miles (23 km) to the south, offering an alternate route. The city is surrounded by the rolling farmland of the Palouse.

== Demographics ==
Historical population
Census	Pop.	Note	%±
1880	36		—
1890	303		741.7%
1900	331		9.2%
1910	299		−9.7%
1920	291		−2.7%
1930	218		−25.1%
1940	203		−6.9%
1950	242		19.2%
1960	208		−14.0%
1970	179		−13.9%
1980	276		54.2%
1990	229		−17.0%
2000	240		4.8%
2010	278		15.8%
2020	280		0.7%
U.S. Decennial Census; 2015 Estimate

=== 2020 census ===
As of the 2020 census, Spangle had a population of 280. The median age was 43.1 years. 18.6% of residents were under the age of 18 and 21.1% of residents were 65 years of age or older. For every 100 females there were 100.0 males, and for every 100 females age 18 and over there were 105.4 males age 18 and over.

0.0% of residents lived in urban areas, while 100.0% lived in rural areas.

There were 123 households in Spangle, of which 40.7% had children under the age of 18 living in them. Of all households, 46.3% were married-couple households, 26.8% were households with a male householder and no spouse or partner present, and 20.3% were households with a female householder and no spouse or partner present. About 23.5% of all households were made up of individuals and 10.6% had someone living alone who was 65 years of age or older.

There were 127 housing units, of which 3.1% were vacant. The homeowner vacancy rate was 2.1% and the rental vacancy rate was 0.0%.

Racial composition as of the 2020 census
Race	Number	Percent
White	246	87.9%
Black or African American	0	0.0%
American Indian and Alaska Native	5	1.8%
Asian	3	1.1%
Native Hawaiian and Other Pacific Islander	0	0.0%
Some other race	9	3.2%
Two or more races	17	6.1%
Hispanic or Latino (of any race)	9	3.2%

=== 2010 census ===
As of the 2010 census, there were 278 people, 118 households, and 74 families living in the city. The population density was 772.2 inhabitants per square mile (298.1/km^{2}). There were 126 housing units at an average density of 350.0 per square mile (135.1/km^{2}). The racial makeup of the city was 97.5% White, 1.4% Native American, 0.4% Asian, 0.4% from other races, and 0.4% from two or more races. Hispanic or Latino of any race were 0.4% of the population.

There were 118 households, of which 30.5% had children under the age of 18 living with them, 49.2% were married couples living together, 5.1% had a female householder with no husband present, 8.5% had a male householder with no wife present, and 37.3% were non-families. 30.5% of all households were made up of individuals, and 12.7% had someone living alone who was 65 years of age or older. The average household size was 2.36 and the average family size was 2.97.

The median age in the city was 40.8 years. 21.9% of residents were under the age of 18; 9.4% were between the ages of 18 and 24; 24.2% were from 25 to 44; 24.8% were from 45 to 64; and 19.8% were 65 years of age or older. The gender makeup of the city was 51.1% male and 48.9% female.

=== 2000 census ===
As of the 2000 census, there were 240 people, 99 households, and 66 families living in the town. The population density was 625.6 people per square mile (243.9/km^{2}). There were 113 housing units at an average density of 294.6 per square mile (114.8/km^{2}). The racial makeup of the town was 98.33% White, 0.42% Native American, and 1.25% from two or more races. Hispanic or Latino of any race were 2.50% of the population.

There were 99 households, out of which 31.3% had children under the age of 18 living with them, 50.5% were married couples living together, 11.1% had a female householder with no husband present, and 33.3% were non-families. 27.3% of all households were made up of individuals, and 11.1% had someone living alone who was 65 years of age or older. The average household size was 2.42 and the average family size was 2.94.

In the town the age distribution of the population shows 25.4% under the age of 18, 8.8% from 18 to 24, 26.7% from 25 to 44, 24.2% from 45 to 64, and 15.0% who were 65 years of age or older. The median age was 35 years. For every 100 females, there were 112.4 males. For every 100 females age 18 and over, there were 110.6 males.

The median income for a household in the town was $38,393, and the median income for a family was $40,556. Males had a median income of $31,071 versus $26,250 for females. The per capita income for the town was $17,128. About 10.3% of families and 18.8% of the population were below the poverty line, including 28.3% of those under the age of eighteen and none of those 65 or over.

== Education ==
Spangle High School graduated its first class in 1908 and its last one in 1960 after the Liberty Consolidated District was formed with nearby communities. Class composities from the high school are now at the Spangle Service Club.

Spangle is the home of Upper Columbia Academy and Liberty High School. Upper Columbia Academy, a boarding high school affiliated with the Seventh-day Adventist Church, is approximately 2 miles southeast of Spangle. 5.5 miles East of Upper Columbia Academy is Liberty High School, a rural school serving the communities of Spangle, Plaza, Fairfield, Mount Hope, Latah, and Waverly. It is a "B" school that has a total of around 450 students (K-12).
