= Eastern North Carolina School for the Deaf =

Public school in Wilson, North Carolina, US

Eastern North Carolina School for the Deaf (ENCSD) is a public school for the deaf in Wilson, North Carolina. Its service area is defined by the state as the 54 counties to the east.

There were parents in the east of the state wishing for their deaf children to have a school closer than the North Carolina School for the Deaf. A bill to establish the school passed in 1960, and a referendum to fund it passed in 1961. R.M. McAdams became the first superintendent effective October 1963. In January 1964 the authorities began preparing the facility, with the school itself opening in August and with dormitories opening in spring 1965. The initial group of students numbered 88. Under desegregation, black deaf students from the Garner campus of the Governor Morehead School were moved to ENCSD.

The school has dormitory facilities. About 121 soldiers of the Seymour Johnson Air Force Base repainted them in 2016.

The North Carolina General Assembly made the school an independent state agency governed by a five-member board of trustees effective July 1, 2024. This change, with four trustees to be appointed by the legislature, is expected to make governance of the school more partisan and to give the school more local control over admissions.

== See also ==
- Governor Morehead School for the Blind
