= Diamond Ranch Academy =

Defunct therapeutic boarding school in Hurricane, Utah, United States

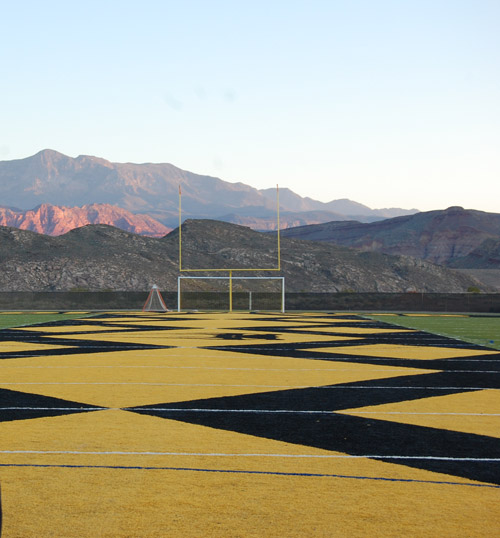
- The football field at Diamond Ranch Academy

Location
- 433 Diamond Ranch Pkwy; Hurricane, Utah, Washington County, Utah 84737; United States; 37°9′34.2″N 113°23′4.2″W

Information
- Type: Therapeutic boarding school
- Motto: Healing Families, One Youth at a Time.
- Established: 1999
- Founder: Rob Dias
- Closed: 14 August 2023
- CEEB code: 450132
- NCES School ID: A0702299
- Director: Ricky Dias
- Principal: Reeve Knighton
- Faculty: 8
- Grades: 7–12
- Age range: 12–18
- Enrollment: 130
- Color
- Teams: Football, Baseball
- Team name: Diamondbacks, Lady Diamondbacks
- Accreditation: Northwest Accreditation Commission
- Website: www.diamondranchacademy.com

Diamond Ranch Academy was a therapeutic boarding school just outside the town of Hurricane, Utah, United States. It admitted adolescents, 12–18, with various issues, including anger management issues and major depressive disorder. Diamond Ranch Academy was founded in Idaho Falls in 1999 by Rob Dias and later moved to southern Utah, where it occupied a 200-acre (81 ha) ranch. It closed in August 2023 after Utah officials decided not to renew the school's license.

Its education programs were accredited by the Northwest Accreditation Commission, The Joint Commission, and its courses generally lasted between ten and twelve months. Activities included various sports, including interscholastic competition, as well as caring for farm animals.

Diamond Ranch Academy charged a tuition fee of $12,000 per month. Some students who required special education services had their tuition fees covered by school districts in California and Washington.

In 2022, a student died at the school after a period of illness, and the Utah Department of Health subsequently issued an extreme level citation to Diamond Ranch Academy for failure to provide and seek necessary medical care for a client.

== Oversight ==
- State of Utah Department of Human Services
- National Association of Therapeutic Schools and Programs
