= Governor Morehead School =

School for the blind in North Carolina

Coordinates: 35.779°N 78.659°W

Information
- Former names: North Carolina State School for the Blind and Deaf; Institution for Education of the Deaf, Dumb, and Blind
- Established: 1845; 181 years ago
- Grades: K–12
- Enrollment: 44 (2023-2024)

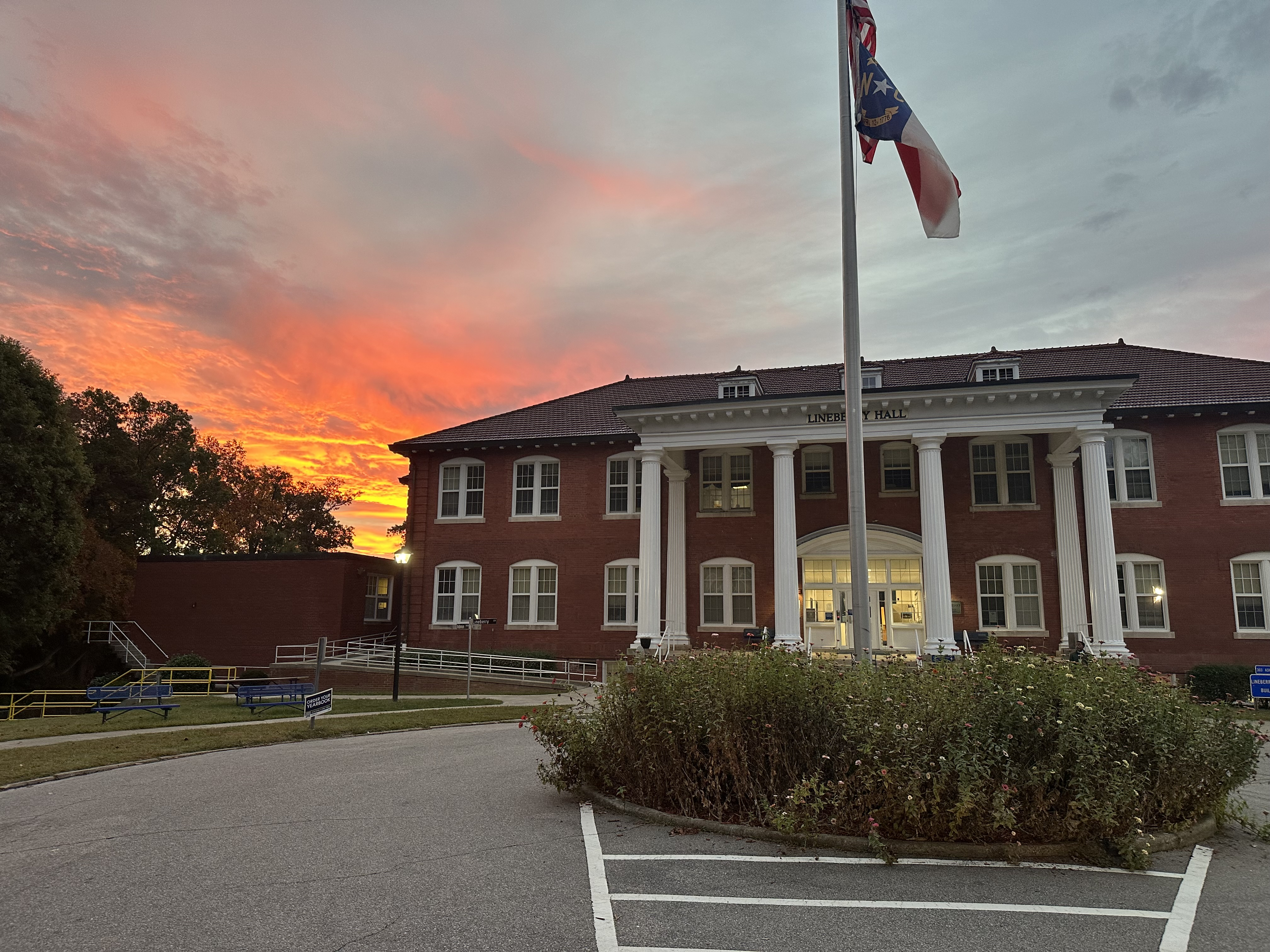

Governor Morehead School (GMS), is a K–12 public school for the blind in Raleigh, North Carolina. In the era of de jure educational segregation in the United States, it served blind people of all races and deaf black people. It was formerly known as the North Carolina State School for the Blind and Deaf, and the Institution for Education of the Deaf, Dumb, and Blind.

== History ==
In 1845, the school was established; it took ages 5–21. It served African-American students from the beginning, in separate facilities under educational segregation in the United States. In 1898 a dormitory for the school was built by Frank Pierce Milburn.

It was the first American school to educate black, blind, and deaf students.

In 1923 white students moved to its current site in Raleigh, while black students were on the original campus, in Garner. The school took both deaf and blind black students.

In 1964 it got its current name. In 1966 the U.S. federal authorities were withholding $89,927 aid in Title I funds as the school had not yet desegregated. In 1967, as part of racial desegregation, the school began swapping the racial groups across the campuses. Black deaf students were to be moved to the North Carolina School for the Deaf and the East North Carolina School for the Deaf, so Morehead became a blind-only school. In 1977 desegregation was completed. The school namesake is John Motley Morehead, former Governor of North Carolina.

In 2014 there were discussions over whether the City of Raleigh should buy land that included GMS property. The property concerned included a field, unused, with 7.3 acres (3.0 ha) of land total. In 2014 the City of Raleigh offered to buy the Dorothea Dix property and the Morehead field for $51.26 million. The North Carolina House of Representatives approved a bill allowing the sale.

After legislative changes to the school's governance went into effect July 1, 2024, the school has been governed by a board of five trustees, four appointed by the legislature and one by the North Carolina State Board of Education. The change in governance is expected to allow the school to set more restrictive admissions policies.

== Campus ==
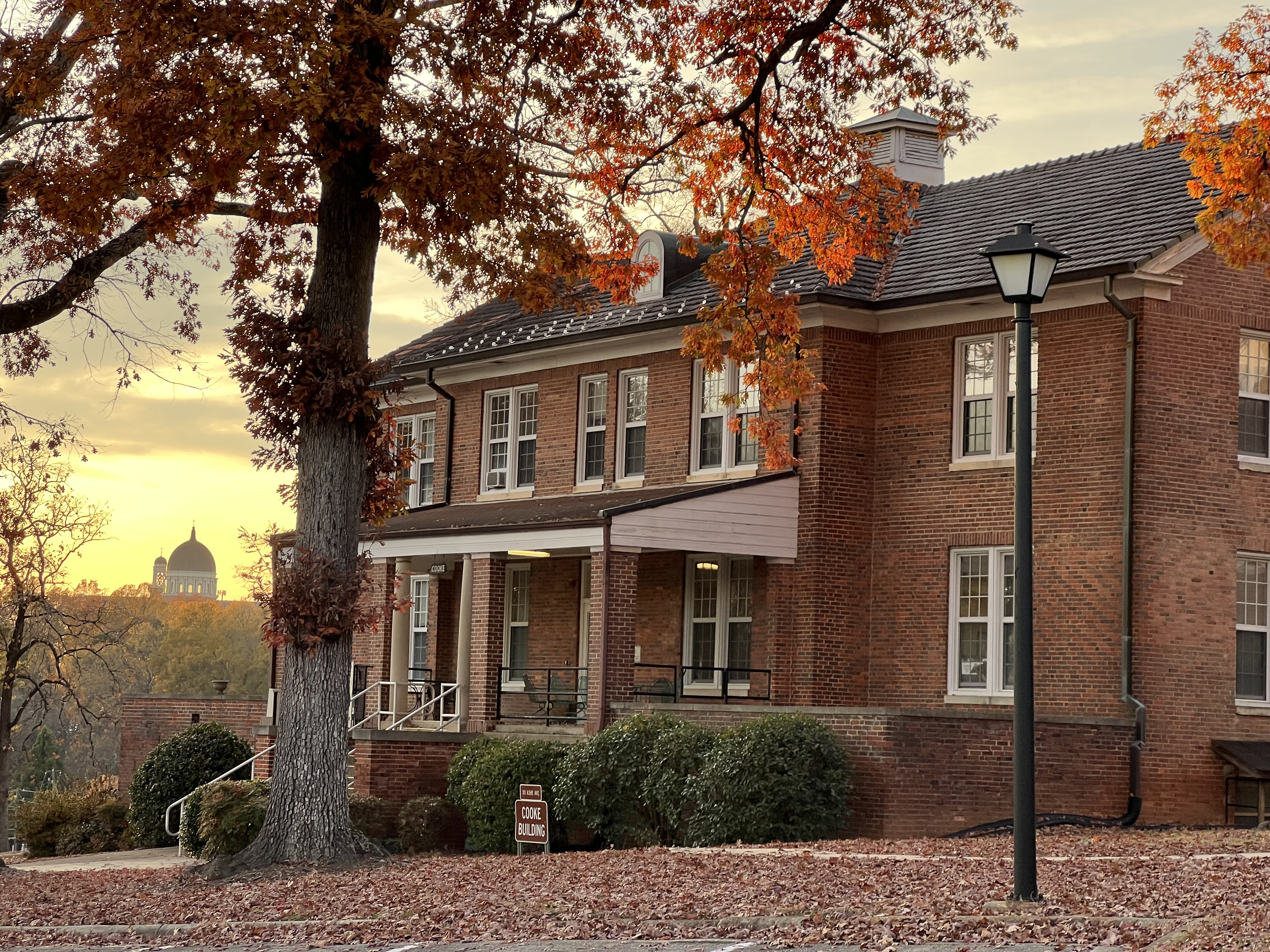
Cooke Building

The school has dormitory facilities.

The campus hosts grades 6–10 of the Wake County Public Schools institution Wake Young Women's Leadership Academy.

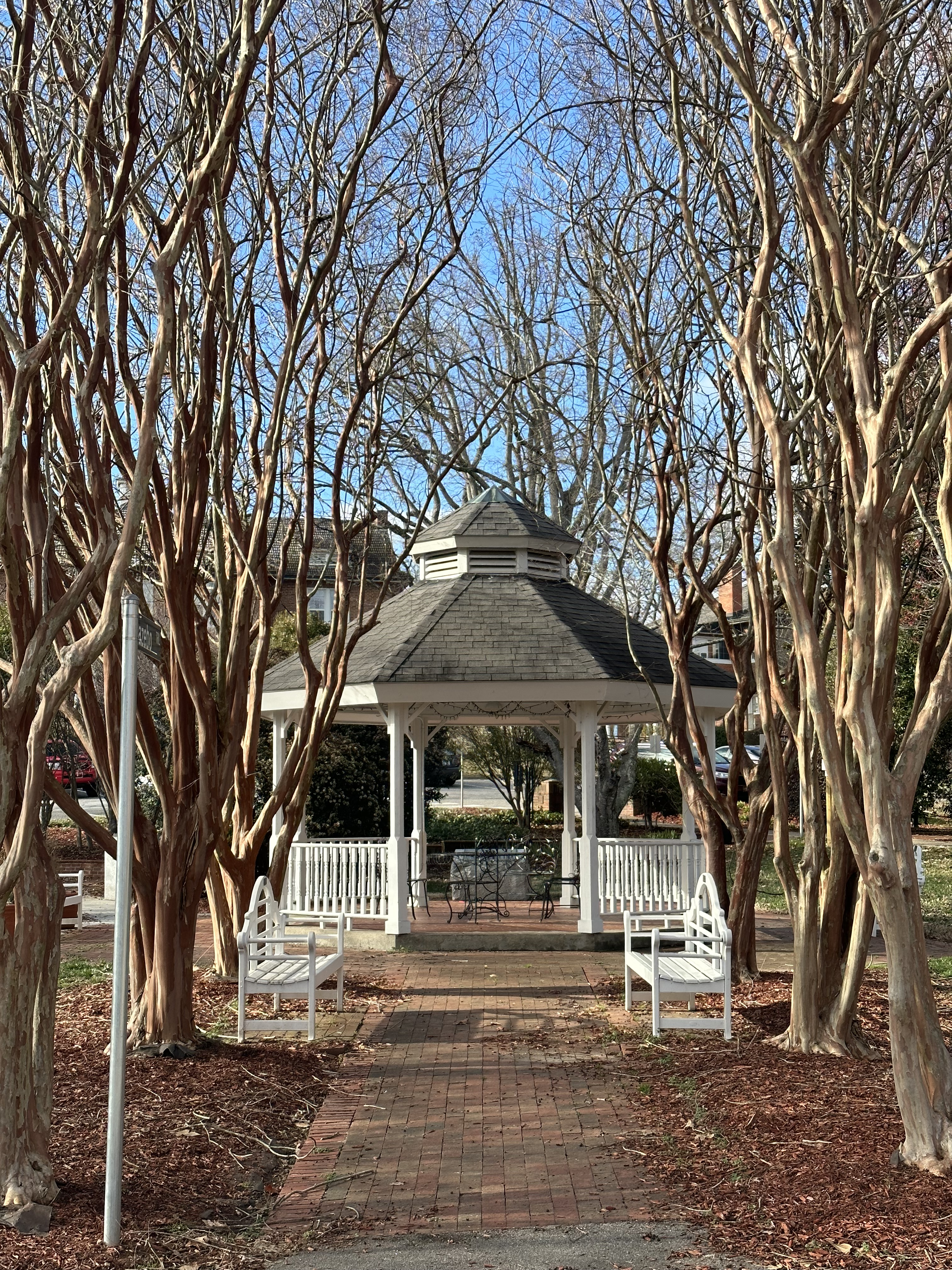
Path into Garden between buildings on GMS Campus

It is adjacent to Central Prison.

== Student body ==
As of 2016 about 66% board.

== Notable people ==
- Skeeter Brandon, blues musician
- Martha Louise Morrow Foxx, educator of the blind in Mississippi
- Fred Hedrick, jurist
- Vernon Malone, politician, former school superintendent
- Ronnie Milsap, country musician
- Doc Watson, bluegrass, country, folk, blues, and gospel musician

== See also ==
- Eastern North Carolina School for the Deaf
- North Carolina School for the Deaf
