= North Carolina School for the Deaf =

Residential school in North Carolina, US

Coordinates: 35.72972°N 81.690295°W

Location
- 517 West Fleming Drive; Morganton, North Carolina; United States

Information
- Type: Public
- Established: 1894 (132 years ago)
- CEEB code: 342738
- Director: Mark Patrick
- Grades: Pre-K–12
- Enrollment: 86
- Colors: Blue and white
- Athletics conference: NCHSAA, Independent 1A
- North Carolina School for the Deaf: Main Building
- U.S. National Register of Historic Places
- Location within North Carolina Location within the United States
- Location: U.S. 64 and Fleming Dr., Morganton, North Carolina
- Area: 4 acres (1.6 ha)
- Built: 1892
- Architect: Bauer, Adolphus Gustavus
- Architectural style: Late Victorian
- MPS: Morganton MRA (AD)
- NRHP reference No.: 76001311
- Added to NRHP: December 12, 1976
- North Carolina School for the Deaf Historic District
- U.S. National Register of Historic Places
- U.S. Historic district
- Location within North Carolina Location within the United States
- Location: Jct. US 70 and US 64, Morganton, North Carolina
- Area: 68 acres (28 ha)
- Architect: Bauer, Agustus; Benton, Charles C.
- Architectural style: Colonial Revival, Late Victorian, Romanesque
- MPS: Morganton MRA
- NRHP reference No.: 89000325
- Added to NRHP: April 20, 1989
- Mascot: Bears
- Website: www.ncsd.net

The North Carolina School for the Deaf (NCSD) is a state-supported residential school for deaf children established in 1894, in Morganton, North Carolina, US.

== Current operations ==
North Carolina School for the Deaf is one of two primary public schools for Deaf and hard of hearing students in Pre-K through 12th grade in North Carolina, with the other being the Eastern North Carolina School for the Deaf. The school offers an education program as well as vocational rehabilitation services on campus for students after graduation. The school has dormitory facilities. It is accredited by Cognia (formerly Advance Education) and the Conference of Educational Administrators of Schools and Programs for the Deaf.

The North Carolina General Assembly passed legislation changing several aspects of the school's governance, including making the school an independent state agency starting July 1, 2024. The school will now be governed by a five-member board of trustees, with four members appointed by the General Assembly and one member by the Board of Education. The change is expected to give the school more control over admissions policies.

As of 2025, the school had an annual budget of over $11 million. The Deaf & Blind Pathways Foundation, formerly known as NCSD Foundation, is a nonprofit independent from the school, but it works cooperatively with them to raise funds for things like educational equipment, field trips, and college scholarships.

== Campus ==
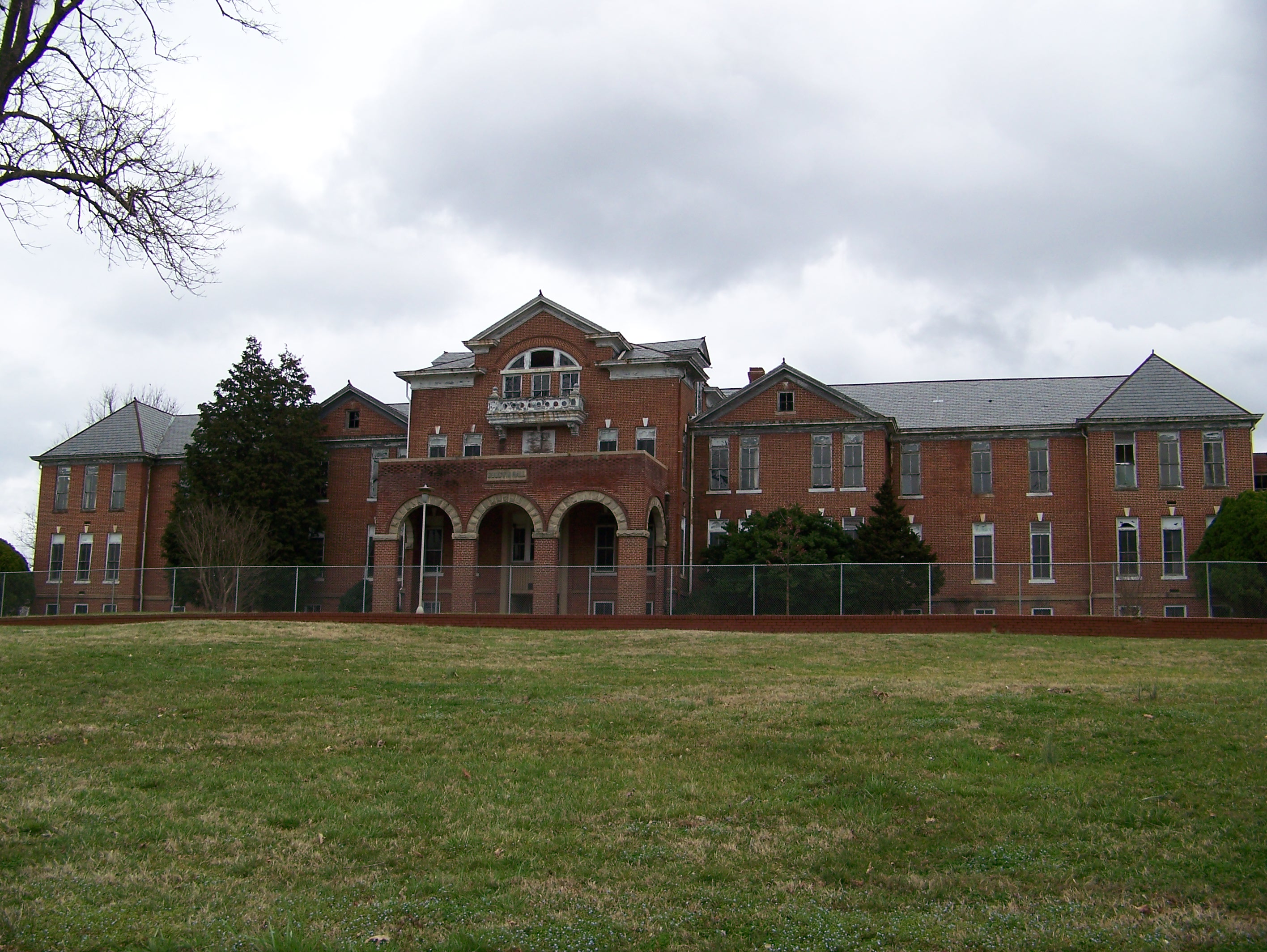
Goodwin Hall in 2012, which is now used by the North Carolina School of Science and Mathematics

The school is on a national historic district campus in Morganton, North Carolina with 12 buildings on 160 acres (650,000 m^{2}) of land. The historic district encompasses 14 historic buildings constructed between about 1891 and 1939. They include the main building, classroom buildings, recreational facilities, the original

infirmary, staff housing, and farm buildings. They representations of Victorian, Romanesque Revival, Colonial Revival style architecture. The main building is a high Victorian three-story brick building with a slate roof and five-story tower. The Main Building was listed on the National Register of Historic Places in 1976 and the historic district in 1989.

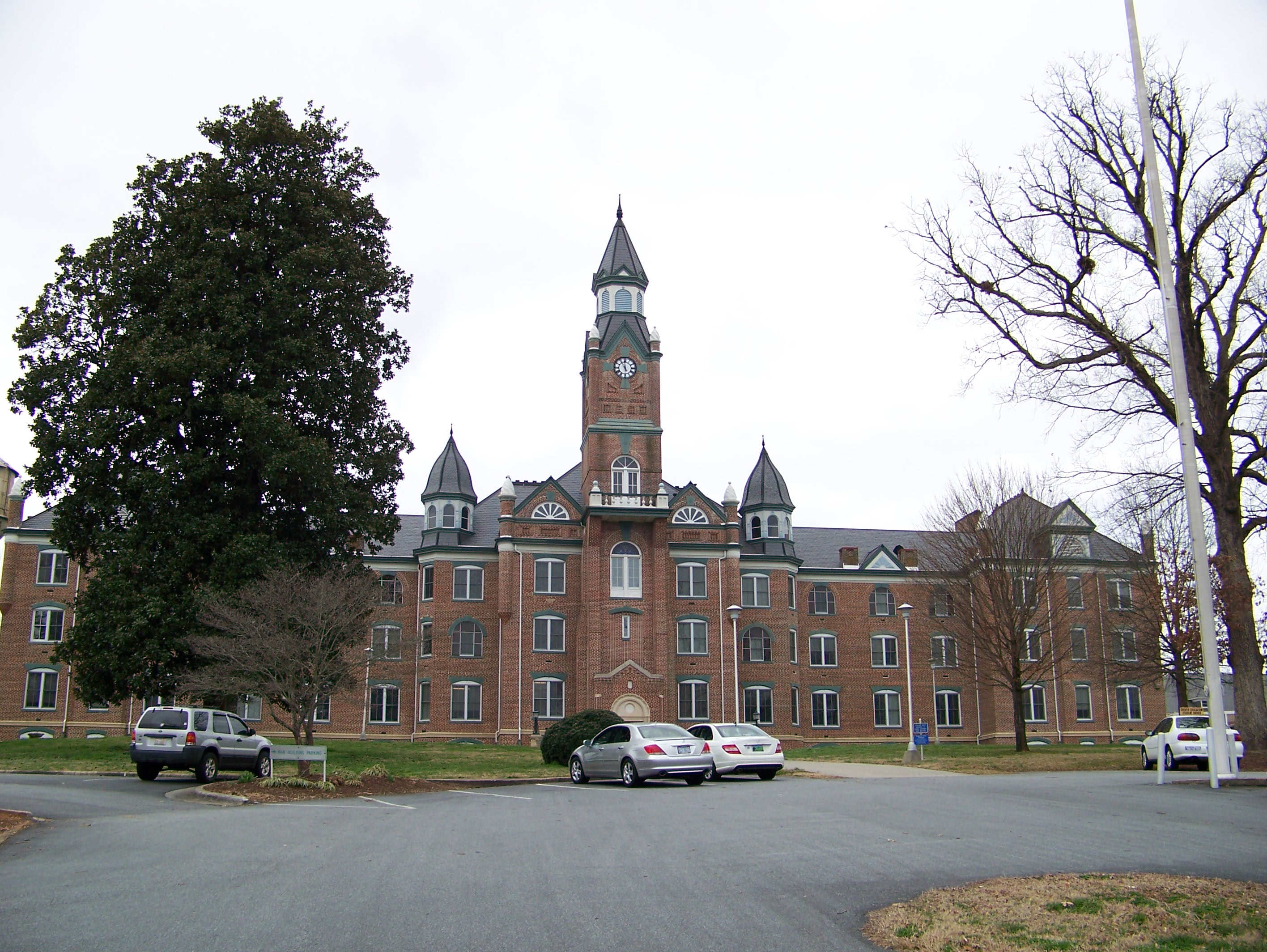
Main Building in 2012

The North Carolina School for the Deaf Historical Museum is located on the campus of the school for the Deaf at Morganton, North Carolina. The original site was in the Historic Main Building common room before it was moved to the former Superintendent's Home in 2003. The Museum was spearheaded as a Senior Project by Jimmy Autrey, NCSD graduate of 1977 along with a number of student & staff volunteers. The Museum displays a historical timeline of pictures & artifacts pertaining to the establishment of the North Carolina School for the Deaf in 1891 as well as the original North Carolina Institution for the Deaf & Blind in 1845 & the NC Institution for Colored Deaf & Blind in 1869, both at Raleigh, North Carolina. The Museum maintains a record of student enrollment, organizational activities, school publications, memorabilia, photographic images, newspapers and class books in the Archival Collection Room. Currently, the Archives have over 1000 pictures with the state of the art computerized storage for research purposes and exhibition.

== History ==
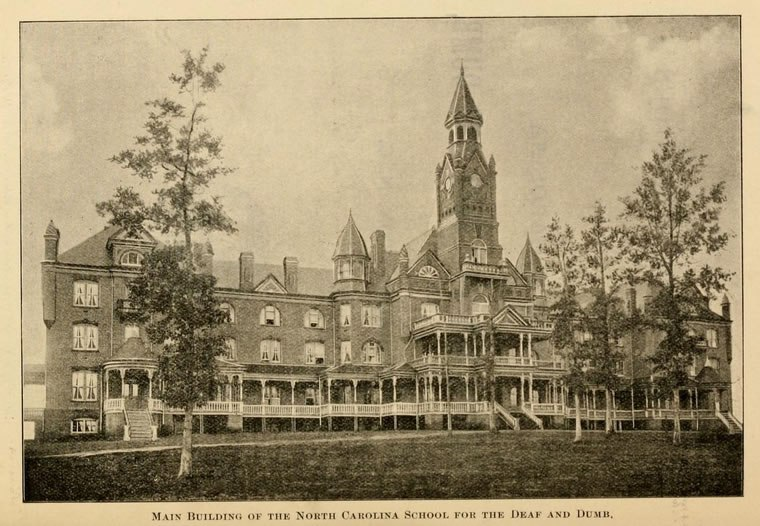
"Main Building for the North Carolina School for the Deaf," from the Third Biennial Report of the Board of Directores of the North Carolina School for the Deaf, 1896 (page 2)

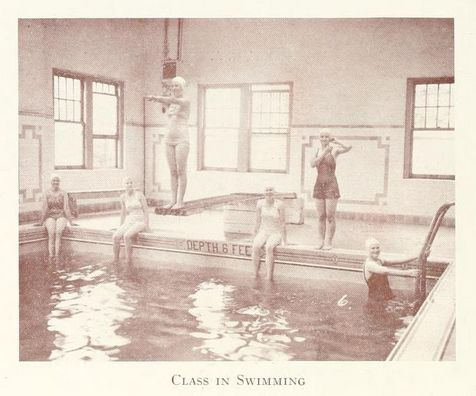
"Class in Swimming," undated photograph from North Carolina School for the Deaf at Morganton, 1894–1944 (page 68)

In 1845, W.D. Cooke was hired by the state and a school was opened in Raleigh with seven deaf pupils. The school remained open during the American Civil War, then later suffered under the incompetent leadership of political appointees.

Around 1890 the education trend in the United States was to have separate schools for deaf children and blind children. This led to a series of hearings that, in turn, led to legislative action. The result was funding for a new school for deaf children and its location in Morganton, both in 1891. The prime advocate for a new school was Edward McKee Goodwin (1859–1937) of Raleigh who, in 1894, became the first superintendent, an appointment he held until 1936. The person instrumental for the location in Morganton was Col. Samuel McDowell Tate (1830–1897) of Morganton. The school for the blind remained in Raleigh as The Governor Morehead School.

During the Civil War, Confederate money was printed at the school.

Under desegregation in the 1960s, black deaf students from the Garner campus of Governor Morehead School were moved to NCSD.

Due to declining student populations, there were considerations on whether to close the school in 1986, 1991, and 2000, but the school remained open. In 2017, a portion of the land and four buildings were transferred to the Durham-based North Carolina School of Science and Mathematics to establish a second campus in Morganton.

== See also ==
- Eastern North Carolina School for the Deaf
