= SpikeOut Tournament =

The Spike-Out Volleyball Tournament originated at the Indiana School for the Deaf in 1999 under the athletic director and Volleyball Coach Brian Bippus, who envisioned a national deaf volleyball tournament bringing together outstanding teams and athletes. The idea was to bring top teams to one site and let them “spike each other out” to claim the national championship. The school who wins that year's tournament often win the year's Deaf Prep National Volleyball Championship. Texas School for the Deaf Girls' was the team to win the inaugural SpikeOut Volleyball Tournament championship in 1999.

== History of SpikeOut Tournament ==
SpikeOut I (1999)

Champion: Texas School for the Deaf

2nd Place: Model Secondary School for the Deaf

Host: Indiana School for the Deaf (Indianapolis, IN)

SpikeOut II (2000)

Champions: Model Secondary School for the Deaf

2nd Place: Indiana School for the Deaf

Host: Model Secondary School for the Deaf (Washington, D.C.)

SpikeOut III (2001)

Champions: Indiana School for the Deaf

2nd Place: Model Secondary School for the Deaf

Host: Kansas State School For the Deaf (Olathe, KS)

SpikeOut IV (2002)

Champions: Indiana School for the Deaf

2nd Place: Maryland School for the Deaf

Host: Texas School for the Deaf (Austin, TX)

SpikeOut V (2003)

Champions: Maryland School for the Deaf

2nd Place: Indiana School for the Deaf

Host: Maryland School for the Deaf (Frederick, MD)

SpikeOut VI (2004)

Champions: Indiana School for the Deaf

2nd Place: Maryland School for the Deaf

Host: Minnesota State Academy for the Deaf (Faribault, MN)

SpikeOut VII (2005)

Champions: Indiana School for the Deaf

2nd Place: Maryland School for the Deaf

Host: California School for the Deaf, Fremont (Fremont, CA)

SpikeOut VIII (2006)

Champions: Maryland School for the Deaf

2nd Place: Texas School for the Deaf

Host: Indiana School for the Deaf (Indianapolis, IN)

SpikeOut VIV (2007)

Champions: Maryland School for the Deaf

2nd Place: Texas School for the Deaf

Host: Texas School for the Deaf (Austin, TX)

SpikeOut X (2008)

Champions: Maryland School for the Deaf

2nd Place: Indiana School for the Deaf

Host: Maryland School for the Deaf (Frederick, MD)

SpikeOut XI (2009)

Champions: Maryland School for the Deaf

2nd Place: Indiana School for the Deaf

Host: Wisconsin School for the Deaf (Delavan, WI)

SpikeOut XII (2010)

Champions: Maryland School for the Deaf

2nd Place: Indiana School for the Deaf

Host: California School for the Deaf, Riverside (Riverside, CA)

SpikeOut XIII (2011)

Champions: Indiana School for the Deaf

2nd Place: Maryland School for the Deaf

Host: Indiana School for the Deaf (Indianapolis, IN)

SpikeOut XIV (2012)

Champions: Texas School for the Deaf

2nd Place: Indiana School for the Deaf

Host: Arizona State Schools for the Deaf and Blind (Tucson, AZ)

SpikeOut XV (2013)

Champions: California School for the Deaf, Fremont

2nd Place: Maryland School for the Deaf

Host: Texas School for the Deaf (Austin, TX)

SpikeOut XVI (2014)

Champions: Maryland School for the Deaf

2nd Place: Indiana School for the Deaf

Host: Maryland School for the Deaf (Frederick, MD)

SpikeOut XVII (2015)

Champions: Maryland School for the Deaf

2nd Place: Indiana School for the Deaf

Host: California School for the Deaf, Fremont (Fremont, CA)

SpikeOut XVIII (2016)

Champions: Texas School for the Deaf

2nd Place: Maryland School for the Deaf

Host: Indiana School for the Deaf (Indianapolis, IN)

SpikeOut XIX (2017)

Div 1 Champions: Texas School for the Deaf

Div 1 2nd Place: Maryland School for the Deaf

Div 2 Champions: Western Pennsylvania School for the Deaf

Div 2 2nd Place: Marie Philip & Walden Schools at The Learning Center for the Deaf

Host: Maryland School for the Deaf (Frederick, MD)

SpikeOut XX (2018)

Champions: Maryland School for the Deaf

2nd Place: Texas School for the Deaf

Host: Model Secondary School for the Deaf (Washington, D.C.)

SpikeOut XXI (2019)

Div. 1 Champions: Texas School for the Deaf

Div. 1 2nd Place: Model Secondary School for the Deaf

Div. 2 Champions: Rochester School for the Deaf

Div. 2 2nd Place: Washington School for the Deaf

Host: California School for the Deaf, Riverside (Riverside, CA)

SpikeOut (2020)

CANCELLED DUE TO COVID-19

Host: Maryland School for the Deaf (Frederick, MD)

SpikeOut (2021)

CANCELLED DUE TO COVID-19

Host: California School for the Deaf, Fremont (Fremont, CA)

SpikeOut XXII (2022)

Div. 1 Champions: Indiana School for the Deaf

Div. 1 2nd Place: Texas School for the Deaf

Div. 2 Champions: Kansas State School For the Deaf

Div. 2 2nd Place: Marie Philip & Walden Schools at The Learning Center for the Deaf

Host: Indiana School for the Deaf (Indianapolis, IN)

SpikeOut XXIII (2023)

Champions: Texas School for the Deaf

2nd Place: Indiana School for the Deaf

Host: Model Secondary School for the Deaf (Washington, D.C.)

SpikeOut XXIV (2024)

Champions: Maryland School for the Deaf

2nd Place: Texas School for the Deaf

Host: New Mexico School for the Deaf (Santa Fe, NM)

SpikeOut XXV (2025)

Champions: Maryland School for the Deaf

2nd Place: Texas School for the Deaf

Host: Texas School for the Deaf (Austin, TX)

SpikeOut XXVI (2026)

Champions: Texas School for the Deaf

2nd Place: California School for the Deaf, Riverside

Host: Maryland School for the Deaf (Frederick, MD)

SpikeOut XXVII (2027)

Champions: TBD

2nd Place: TBD

Host: California School for the Deaf, Riverside (Riverside, CA)

== Trivia ==
- Texas School for the Deaf became the first school to win the annual SpikeOut Volleyball Tournament
- Model Secondary School for the Deaf became the first school to appear in three consecutive SpikeOut championship matches, doing so from 1999 through 2001.
- Maryland has now hosted SpikeOut five times: 2003, 2008, 2014, 2017 and 2026. That ties Indiana, which hosted in 1999, 2006, 2011, 2016, and 2022, for the most hosting SpikeOut tournaments.
- Model, Indiana and Maryland are the only three schools that have won the SpikeOut Tournament on home turf - Model became the first team to do so in 2000, Indiana won on its home turf twice in 2011 and 2022, and Maryland is the only school to do it three times, in 2003, 2008 & 2014.
- Maryland had the most appearances in championship game; eighteen times out of twenty-six tournaments.
- Maryland and Indiana faced each other in championship game ten times, Maryland winning six titles while Indiana winning four titles.
- Maryland is the first team to win five consecutive titles, from 2006 to 2010.
- Maryland holds the record for the most SpikeOut championships with 11. Following its 2026 championship, Texas ranks second with seven titles, while Indiana ranks third with six.
- At SpikeOut XIV in 2012, Texas ended Maryland's streak of ten consecutive championship-match appearances which had lasted from 2002 through 2011.
- Texas won its second SpikeOut championship in 2012. It was the first championship by a school without an Orioles mascot since Model Secondary School for the Deaf won in 2000.
- The Orioles mascot had appeared in SpikeOut finals thirty-three times in the last twenty-six tournaments.
- California School for the Deaf - Fremont became the first West Coast school to win the SpikeOut championship in 2013.
- CSD-Fremont's 2013 championship was the school's first SpikeOut title, and made it the third school without an Orioles mascot to win the tournament.
- Thought SpikeOut XXVI in 2026, only five schools have won the tournament championship: Maryland (11), Texas (7), Indiana (6), Model (1) and California-Fremont (1).
- Texas School for the Deaf has reached the SpikeOut championship match in nine consecutive tournaments from 2016 through 2026, winning five championships and finished as runner-up four times. The 2020 and 2021 tournaments was cancelled due to COVID-19.
- Two major finals streaks at SpikeOut: Maryland reached 10 consecutive finals from 2002 to 2011, while Texas is currently at nine consecutive played tournaments from 2016 to 2026.
- Maryland's home dominance: Maryland hosted five times and won three of those tournaments (2003, 2008, 2014).
- Texas has won all seven of its SpikeOut championships away from home. Texas has never won a SpikeOut title while hosting tournament in Austin.
- Three programs overwhelmingly dominate SpikeOut: Maryland (11), Texas (7), and Indiana (6) have won 24 of 26 championships - 92.3%. Only Model (2000) and CSD-Fremont (2013) broke their dominance.
- No new school has joined the SpikeOut champions list in 13 years.
- Texas has the longest span between a school's first and latest championships: from the inaugural title in 1999 to its 2026 championship - 27 years.
- Maryland, Indiana and Texas have combined for 46 championship-game appearances and 24 of the 26 SpikeOut championships. Other six finalist spots in SpikeOut history belong to schools other than those three - Model (1999, 2000, 2001, 2019), CSD-Fremont (2013) and CSD-Riverside (2026).
- In 2026, CSD-Riverside became the only sixth school in SpikeOut history to reach the championship match, and second California school to do so, joining CSD-Fremont, the 2013 champion.
