= Clerc Classic =

US Deaf school basketball tournament

The Clerc Classic Basketball Tournament originated at the Model Secondary School for the Deaf in 2000 under its Athletic Director, Michael Weinstock, who envisioned a national basketball tournament for outstanding athletes from the top Deaf schools. The tournament typically occurs during the second weekend of January. The school who wins that year's tournament often wins the year's Deaf Prep National Championship.

== Laurent Clerc ==
Laurent Clerc was born on December 26, 1785. An accident struck him at a young age: one side of his face was burnt after he fell into a fireplace. The fever resulting from the burn ended with Clerc becoming deaf.

Clerc had such devoted parents who sought various medicinal cures before learning about the Royal Institution for the Deaf in Paris, France. Clerc's parents enrolled him at the school where he was put under the guidance of the school's director, Abbe Roche-Ambroise Sicard. The school used sign language as the primary language of instruction which allowed many of Clerc's hidden talents to emerge.

Clerc completed his study in seven years and was rewarded with the position of assistant teacher, in charge of the highest class at the Institution. He eventually moved up as teacher.

In 1816, during Clerc's eighth year of teaching, he met a young Thomas Hopkins Gallaudet, who was searching for an educational system for the Deaf. Gallaudet observed Clerc's work with the students, and ultimately asked Clerc to help him establish the first school for the Deaf in America.

Clerc accepted, and Gallaudet and Clerc set sail from France on June 18, 1816. During the 52-day voyage, they continued to share their knowledge with each other. Upon arrival in America, Clerc and Gallaudet began fundraising efforts by having Clerc present on instruction methods for the Deaf, with Gallaudet assisting as interpreter. They traveled along the east coast, from Boston to Philadelphia, for nearly seven months. They taught and interviewed parents of Deaf children, garnering community support at the same time. Their efforts paid off with the establishment of the first school for the Deaf in Hartford, Connecticut on April 15, 1817. Clerc taught there for the next 41 years providing lessons in sign language and teacher training.

Clerc married a former pupil, Elizabeth Broadman, and fathered four children. Clerc died on July 18, 1869.

Deaf people's lives nowadays would not have been possible without Laurent Clerc. As the first Deaf teacher in America, he contributed greatly towards the development of American Sign Language and deaf education.

== History of the Tournament ==
Clerc Classic I (2000)
Host: Model Secondary School for the Deaf (Washington D.C.)
Boys Champions: Phoenix Day School for the Deaf
Girls Champions: Model Secondary School for the Deaf
Cheerleading Champions: California School for the Deaf, Fremont

Clerc Classic II (2001)
Host: Model Secondary School for the Deaf (Washington D.C.)
Boys Champions: Model Secondary School for the Deaf
Girls Champions: Maryland School for the Deaf
Cheerleading Champions: Model Secondary School for the Deaf

Clerc Classic III (2002)
Host: California School for the Deaf, Fremont (Fremont, CA)
Boys Champions: Model Secondary School for the Deaf
Girls Champions: Maryland School for the Deaf
Cheerleading Champions: Indiana School for the Deaf

Clerc Classic IV (2003)
Host: Indiana School for the Deaf (Indianapolis, IN)
Boys Champions: Indiana School for the Deaf
Girls Champions: Maryland School for the Deaf
Cheerleading Champions: Indiana School for the Deaf

Clerc Classic V (2004)
Host: Maryland School for the Deaf (Frederick, MD)
Boys Champions: Indiana School for the Deaf
Girls Champions: Minnesota State Academy for the Deaf
Cheerleading Champions: Maryland School for the Deaf

Clerc Classic VI (2006)
Host: California School for the Deaf, Riverside (Riverside, CA)
Boys Champions: California School for the Deaf, Fremont
Girls Champions: Indiana School for the Deaf
Cheerleading Champions: Maryland School for the Deaf

Clerc Classic VII (2007)
Host: Model Secondary School for the Deaf (Washington D.C.)
Boys Champions: Maryland School for the Deaf
Girls Champions: Model Secondary School for the Deaf
Cheerleading Champions: California School for the Deaf, Riverside

Clerc Classic VIII (2008)
Host: Minnesota State Academy for the Deaf (Faribault, MN)
Boys Champions: Indiana School for the Deaf
Girls Champions: Texas School for the Deaf
Cheerleading Champions: Model Secondary School for the Deaf

Clerc Classic IX (2009)
Host: Maryland School for the Deaf (Frederick, MD)
Boys Champions: Indiana School for the Deaf
Girls Champions: Model Secondary School for the Deaf
Cheerleading Champions: California School for the Deaf, Riverside

Clerc Classic X (2010)
Host: California School for the Deaf, Fremont (Fremont, CA)
Boys Champions: Maryland School for the Deaf
Girls Champions: Maryland School for the Deaf
Cheerleading Champions: Indiana School for the Deaf

Clerc Classic XI (2011)
Host: Texas School for the Deaf (Austin, TX)
Boys Champions: Maryland School for the Deaf
Girls Champions: Indiana School for the Deaf
Cheerleading Champions: Model Secondary School for the Deaf

Clerc Classic XII (2012)
Host: Indiana School for the Deaf (Indianapolis, IN)
Boys Champions: California School for the Deaf, Fremont
Girls Champions: California School for the Deaf, Fremont
Cheerleading Champions: Indiana School for the Deaf

Clerc Classic XIII (2013)
Host: California School for the Deaf, Riverside (Riverside, CA)
Boys Champions: Indiana School for the Deaf
Girls Champions: California School for the Deaf, Fremont
Cheerleading Champions: California School for the Deaf, Riverside

Clerc Classic XIV (2014)
Host: Indiana School for the Deaf (Indianapolis, IN)
Boys Champions: California School for the Deaf, Fremont
Girls Champions: Maryland School for the Deaf
Cheerleading Champions: Indiana School for the Deaf

Clerc Classic XV (2015)
Host: California School for the Deaf, Fremont (Fremont, CA)
Boys Champions: Indiana School for the Deaf
Girls Champions: Maryland School for the Deaf
Cheerleading Champions: Indiana School for the Deaf

Clerc Classic XVI (2016)
Host: Maryland School for the Deaf (Frederick, MD)
Boys Champions: Maryland School for the Deaf
Girls Champions: Maryland School for the Deaf
Cheerleading Champions: Model Secondary School for the Deaf

Clerc Classic XVII (2017)
Host: Texas School for the Deaf (Austin, TX)
Boys Champions: Indiana School for the Deaf
Girls Champions: Maryland School for the Deaf
Cheerleading Champions: Model Secondary School for the Deaf

Clerc Classic XVIII (2018)
Host: Model Secondary School for the Deaf (Washington D.C.)
Boys Champions: Maryland School for the Deaf
Girls Champions: Texas School for the Deaf
Cheerleading Champions: Model Secondary School for the Deaf

Clerc Classic XIX (2019)
Host: California School for the Deaf, Riverside (Riverside, CA)
Boys Champions: Maryland School for the Deaf
Girls Champions: Texas School for the Deaf
Cheerleading Champions: Model Secondary School for the Deaf

Clerc Classic XX (2020)
Host: Indiana School for the Deaf (Indianapolis, IN)
Boys Champions: Maryland School for the Deaf
Girls Champions: Texas School for the Deaf
Cheerleading Champions: Model Secondary School for the Deaf

Clerc Classic XXI (2021)
Host: California School for the Deaf, Fremont (Fremont, CA)
The tournament has been cancelled due to COVID-19 pandemic.

Clerc Classic XXI (2022)
Host: Maryland School for the Deaf (Frederick, MD)
The tournament has been cancelled due to COVID-19 pandemic.

Clerc Classic XXI (2023)
Host: California School for the Deaf, Fremont (Fremont, CA)
Boys Champions: California School for the Deaf, Riverside
Girls Champions: Indiana School for the Deaf
Cheerleading Champions: Model Secondary School for the Deaf

Clerc Classic XXII (2024)
Host: Maryland School for the Deaf (Frederick, MD)
Boys Champions: Maryland School for the Deaf
Girls Champions: Indiana School for the Deaf
Cheerleading Champions: Model Secondary School for the Deaf

Clerc Classic XXIII (2025)
Host: Texas School for the Deaf (Austin, TX)
Boys Champions: Maryland School for the Deaf
Girls Champions: Florida School for the Deaf and Blind
Cheerleading Champions: Model Secondary School for the Deaf

Clerc Classic XXIV (2026)
Host: Florida School for the Deaf and Blind (St. Augustine, FL)
Boys Champions: Maryland School for the Deaf
Girls Champions: Texas School for the Deaf
Cheerleading Champions: Indiana School for the Deaf

Clerc Classic XXV (2027)
Host: Model Secondary School for the Deaf (Washington D.C.)
Boys Champions: TBD
Girls Champions: TBD
Cheerleading Champions: TBD

== Fast Facts ==
- Model is leading in hosting the Clerc Classic Basketball Tournament five times. Model hosted in 2000, 2001, 2007, 2018 and will host the upcoming tournament in 2027.
- When both boys' and girls' basketball teams from the same school win the championship in the same year, it is a feat. Only two schools have done this, California-Fremont did this in 2012. Maryland did it twice, in 2010 and became the first school to win both titles on its home turf in the same year, in 2016.

GIRLS

- Model and Maryland are the only girls’ basketball teams to have won the championship on home turf, Model has done it twice in 2000 and 2007. Maryland girls' basketball have done this feat in 2016.
- Maryland girls’ basketball team is the first team to win three (2001, 2002, and 2003) and four (2014, 2015, 2016, and 2017) consecutive titles. Texas became the second girls team to win three consecutive titles from 2018 to 2020.
- Maryland School for the Deaf is leading for winning the most Clerc Classic Girls’ basketball titles, winning eight times – 2001, 2002, 2003, 2010, 2014, 2015, 2016 and 2017.
- In the last twenty-three tournaments, only seven schools have won the Clerc Classic girls’ basketball titles; Maryland (8), Texas (5), Indiana (4), Model (3), California-Fremont (2), Minnesota (1), and Florida (1).

BOYS

- Model, Indiana and Maryland are the only boys teams to have won the championship on their home turf. Model became the first boys team to do so in 2000, Indiana won in 2003 and Maryland won on its home turf twice, in 2016 and 2024.
- Model boys’ basketball team was the first team to win two consecutive titles, in 2001 and 2002, then Indiana did it twice in 2003 and 2004 & 2008 and 2009. Maryland is the third team to do so, in 2010 and 2011.
- Maryland is the first boys team to win three consecutive titles from 2018 to 2020, and they did it again from 2024 to 2026.
- Maryland School for the Deaf is in leading by winning the most Clerc Classic Boys’ basketball titles, winning ten times – Maryland won in 2007, 2010, 2011, 2016, 2018, 2019, 2020, 2024, 2025 and 2026.
- In the last twenty-one tournaments, only six schools have won the Clerc Classic boys’ basketball titles; Maryland (10), Indiana (7), California-Fremont (3), Model (2), Phoenix Day (1) and California-Riverside (1).

CHEERLEADING

- Model Secondary School for the Deaf has the most Clerc Classic cheerleading titles, with eleven (2001, 2008, 2011, 2016, 2017, 2018, 2019, 2020, 2023, 2024 and 2025).
- Model cheerleading is the first team to win three (2016, 2017, 2018) and four (2016-2019) and five consecutive titles (2016-2020). They won the 2018 title on their home turf.
- In the last twenty-one tournaments, only five schools have won the Clerc Classic cheerleading titles; Model (11), Indiana (6), Maryland (3) California-Riverside (3), and California-Fremont (1).
