= Deaf Academic Bowl =

Academic competition

The National Deaf Academic Bowl is an academic competition for deaf and hard of hearing students founded by Gallaudet University in 1997.

== Past Champions ==
- 1997 National Champions: California School for the Deaf, Riverside
- 1998 National Champions: California School for the Deaf, Fremont
- 1999 National Champions: California School for the Deaf, Fremont
- 2000 National Champions: Model Secondary School for the Deaf
- 2001 National Champions: Model Secondary School for the Deaf
- 2002 National Champions: Florida School for the Deaf
- 2003 National Champions: Indiana School for the Deaf
- 2004 National Champions: Colorado School for the Deaf and Blind
- 2005 National Champions: Maryland School for the Deaf
- 2006 National Champions: Mountain Lakes High School
- 2007 National Champions: John Hersey High School
- 2008 National Champions: Indiana School for the Deaf
- 2009 National Champions: University High School (Irvine, California)
- 2010 National Champions: Maryland School for the Deaf
- 2011 National Champions: Maryland School for the Deaf
- 2012 National Champions: Maryland School for the Deaf
- 2013 National Champions: Maryland School for the Deaf
- 2014 National Champions: Model Secondary School for the Deaf
- 2015 National Champions: Indiana School for the Deaf
- 2016 National Champions: Rockville High School
- 2017 National Champions: Indiana School for the Deaf
- 2018 National Champions: Indiana School for the Deaf
- 2019 National Champions: John Hersey High School

== National Most Outstanding Players ==
The National Most Outstanding Player Award is the most prestigious individual award that can be given out each year during the National Competitions.

- 2002 National Most Outstanding Player: Tim Woodford (Senior) Florida School for the Deaf and Blind
- 2003 National Most Outstanding Player: Pia Marie Paulone (Senior) Indiana School for the Deaf
- 2004 National Most Outstanding Player: Andrew Ek (Senior) Colorado School for the Deaf
- 2005 National Most Outstanding Player: Tyler DeShaw (Senior) Roosevelt High School
- 2006 National Most Outstanding Player: David Uzzell (Junior) John Hersey High School
- 2007 National Most Outstanding Player: David Uzzell (Senior) John Hersey High School
- 2008 National Most Outstanding Player: Allison Weiner (Senior) Maryland School for the Deaf
- 2009 National Most Outstanding Player: Gianni Manganelli (Senior) University High School
- 2010 National Most Outstanding Player: Bri Herold (Senior) Metro Deaf School / Minnesota North Star Academy
- 2011 National Most Outstanding Player: Paige Foreman (Junior) New Mexico School for the Deaf
- 2012 National Most Outstanding Player: Ted Zoerner (Junior) University High School
- 2013 National Most Outstanding Player: Ethan Sonnenstrahl (Senior) Maryland School for the Deaf
- 2014 National Most Outstanding Player: Jason Antal (Senior) Florida School for the Deaf and Blind
- 2015 National Most Outstanding Player: Tayla Newman (Senior) Maryland School for the Deaf
- 2016 National Most Outstanding Player: Bryan Lukehart-Yun (Junior) Rockville High School
- 2017 National Most Outstanding Player: Franco Bippus (Sophomore) Indiana School for the Deaf
- 2018 National Most Outstanding Player: Franco Bippus (Junior) Indiana School for the Deaf
- 2019 National Most Outstanding Player: Yael Lenga (Junior) John Hersey High School
- 2020 National Most Outstanding Player: Yael Lenga (Senior) John Hersey High School

== Trivia ==
- Maryland School for the Deaf and Indiana School for the Deaf is tied for leading for winning the most National Academic Bowl Champions, with five titles.
- California School for the Deaf - Riverside's Academic Bowl team was the first academic bowl team to win the inaugural National Deaf Academic Bowl Champion in 1997.
- Only three team had won back-to-back champions, California School for the Deaf - Fremont (1998-1999), Model Secondary School for the Deaf (2000-2001) and Indiana School for the Deaf (2017-2018).
- Maryland School for the Deaf is the only academic bowl team to win four consecutive National Academic Bowl Champions, in 2010, 2011, 2012 and 2013.
- Out of 23 National Academic Bowl tournament, Schools for the Deaf won 18 times and mainstream school/deaf program won five national titles.
- After first nine National Academic Bowl tournaments, Mountain Lakes High School became the first mainstream school/deaf program to win the National Academic Bowl title in 2006.
- David Uzzell was the first player to win back-to-back National Most Outstanding Player awards. Since then, Franco Bippus and Yael Lenga have accomplished that feat.
