= Knob Hill, Colorado =

Coordinates: 38°50′28″N 104°47′07″W

External image
- Image of map of Colorado Springs, 1906, Knob Hill is north of Prospect Lake

Knob Hill, is a neighborhood of Colorado Springs in El Paso County, Colorado, United States, and is located northeast of downtown Colorado Springs.

== History ==
=== Colorado School for the Deaf and Blind ===
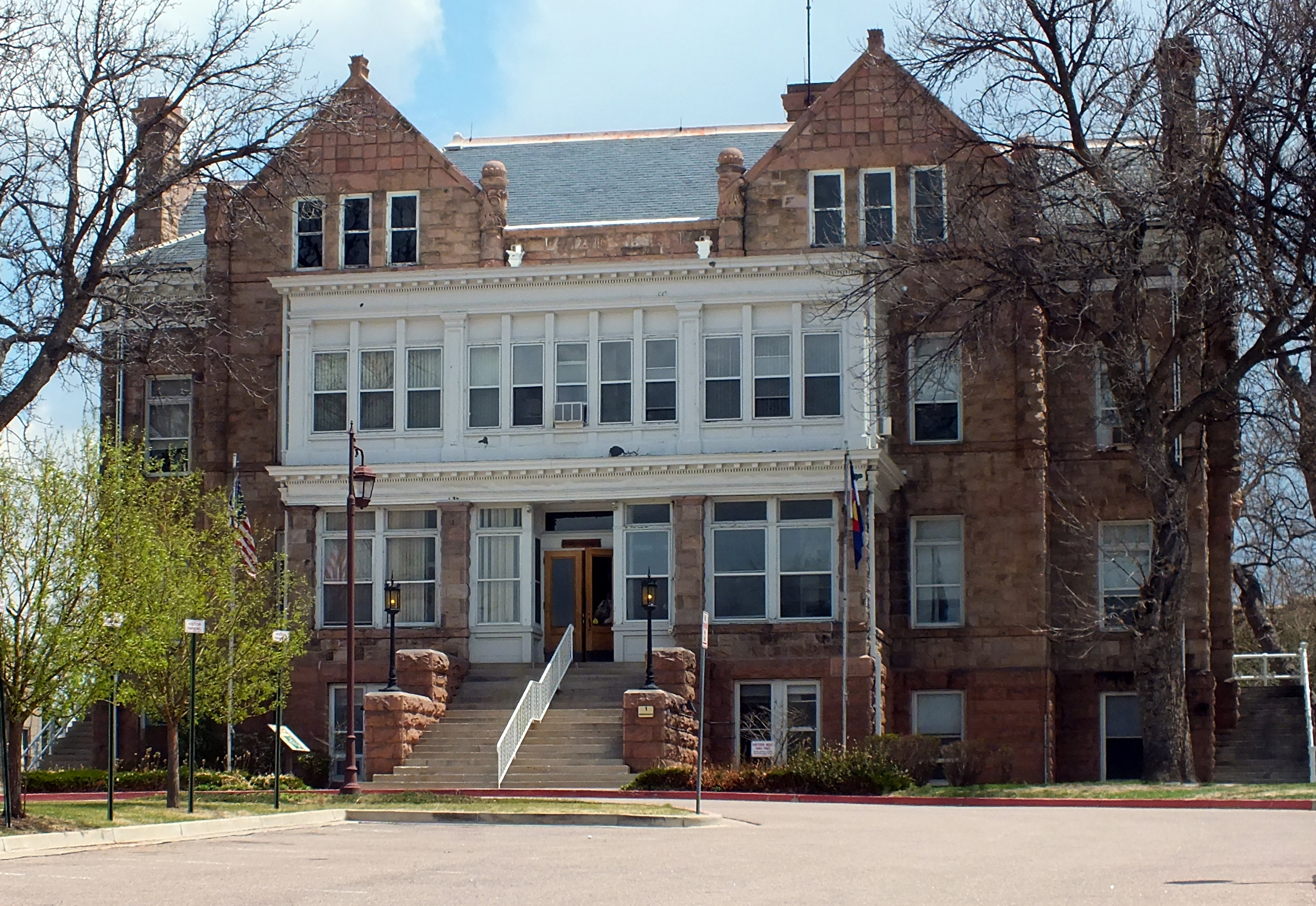
Colorado School for the Deaf and Blind

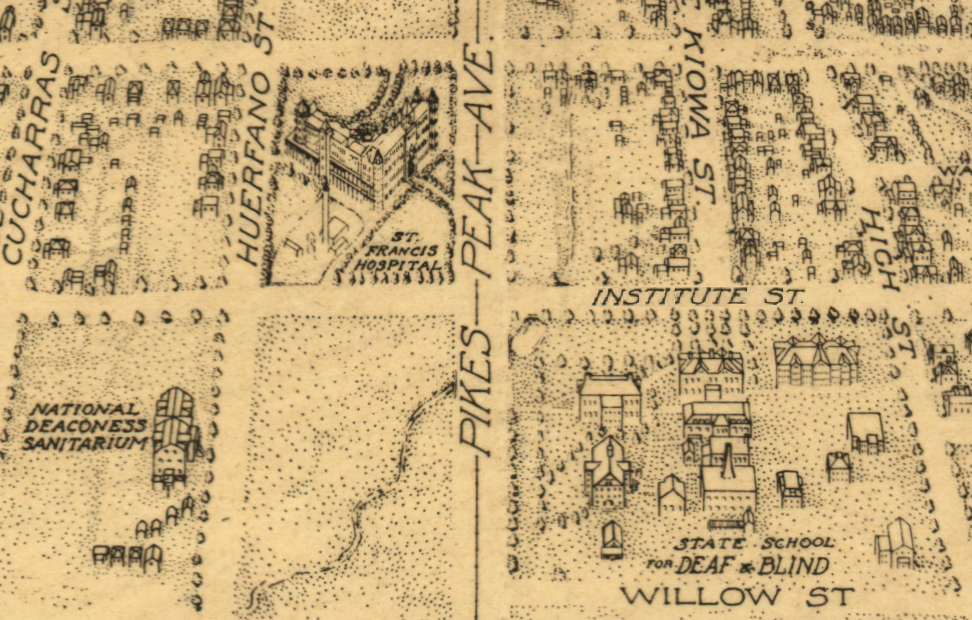
School for the Deaf and the Blind, St. Francis Hospital, and the National Deaconess Sanitarium, 1909

The Colorado Institute of the Education of the Mutes (now Colorado School for the Deaf and Blind) was founded by Jonathan R. Kennedy and opened on April 8, 1874. The school began with a Territorial appropriation of $5,000. It first operated in a rented house with seven students. Kennedy, who had worked at the Kansas State School for the Deaf, was the director of the school. He and his wife had children who attended the school. William Jackson Palmer donated land to build a permanent school on Knob Hill, 1 mile (1.6 km) east of Colorado Springs. In 2014, there are 500 students across the state.

=== Union Printers Home ===
The Childs-Drexel Home for Union Printers was dedicated on May 12, 1892. It was run by the International Typographical Union to take care of ill and elderly patients. The home was bought by Heart Living Centers in 2014.

=== Tesla Experimental Station ===
The inventor Nikola Tesla's wireless power experimental station was located on Knob Hill at a site near the current Kiowa and Foote Streets, between the Colorado School for the Deaf and Blind and the Union Printers' Home. It was built and operated in 1899 and was torn down in 1904. A street car came to Knob Hill, at that time at the edge of the prairie.

=== St. Francis Hospital ===
The St. Francis Hospital was built on Institute Heights at the east end of Pike's Peak Avenue, near the Knob Hill street car line.

=== Other ===
The Pikes Peak Gun Club was on Knob Hill near the city limits.

The Knob Hill Auction Company held monthly auctions on the hill to sell horses. Livestock was sold weekly on Knob Hill, where there was also a nearby cafe.

== Annexation ==
In 1950, 3,612 people lived in Knob Hill. On June 14 of that year, Knob Hill was annexed into Colorado Springs and became the Knob Hill neighborhood.
