= Colorado School for the Deaf and Blind =

Residential school in Colorado Springs, Colorado, US

Colorado School for the Deaf and the Blind
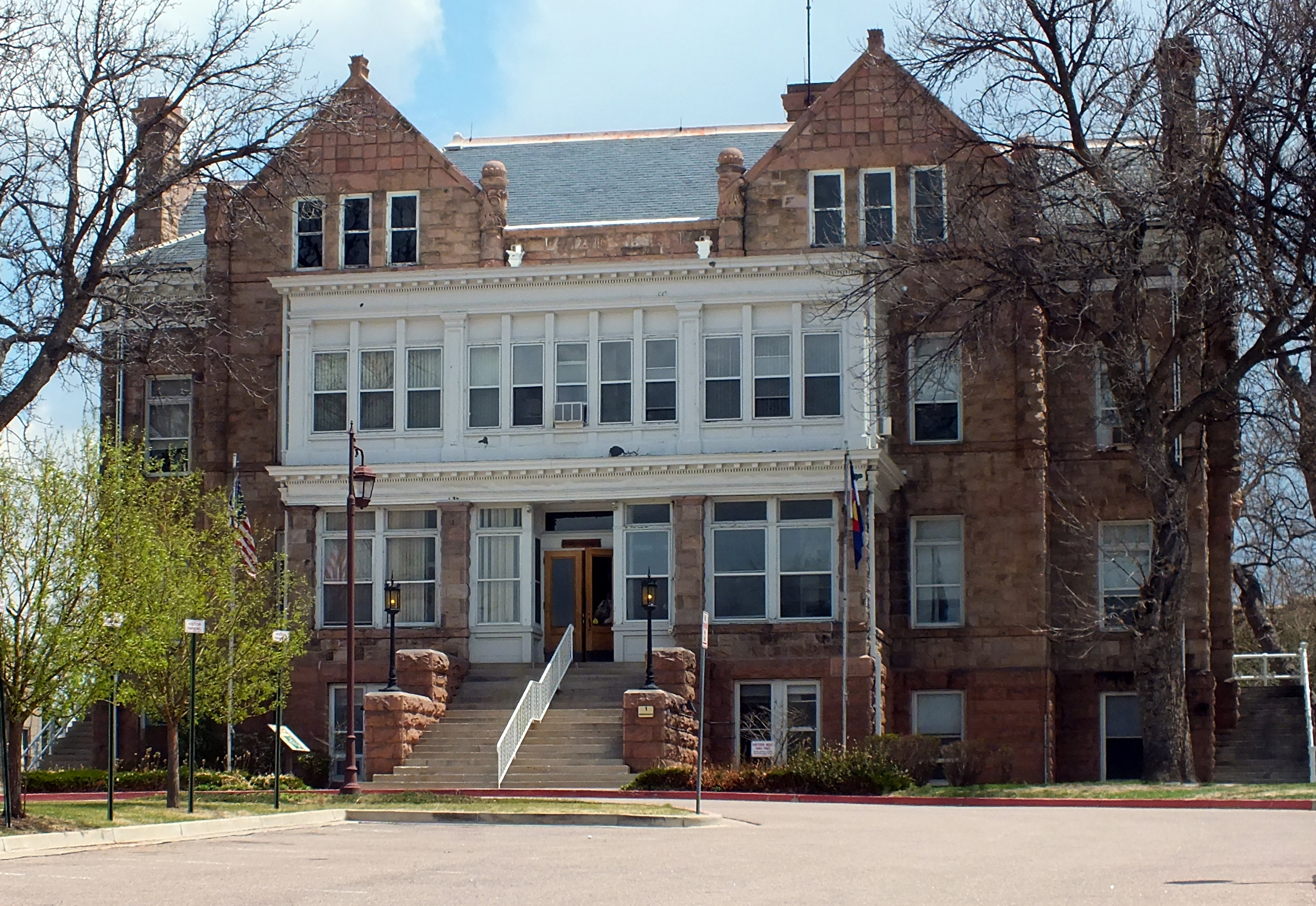

Location
- 33 North Institute Street; Colorado Springs, Colorado 80903; United States; 38°50′06″N 104°48′25″W

Information
- Type: Residential school
- Established: 1874 (152 years ago)
- CEEB code: 060272
- Head of school: Tera Spangler
- Grades: Preschool–12th grade and post high school education
- Language: American Sign Language, English
- Colors: Red, white, black
- Mascot: Bulldogs
- Website: www.csdb.org

The Colorado School for the Deaf and Blind (CSDB) is a K–12 residential school, located on Knob Hill, one mile (1.6 km) east of downtown Colorado Springs, Colorado, near the famous laboratory of Nikola Tesla. The school was founded in 1874 as The Colorado Institute for the Education of Mutes by Jonathan R. Kennedy, who had previously been steward at the Kansas School for the Deaf. The school began in a rented house in downtown Colorado Springs with seven students, three of whom were Kennedy's own children. One of his children, Emma, later married Frank H. Chaney, who was also Deaf, and they became the parents of the actor Lon Chaney.

Colorado Springs' founder William Jackson Palmer was the land-grantor of several institutions in Colorado Springs, including the Colorado School for the Deaf and Blind.

CSDB were the 2004 National Champions in the Deaf Academic Bowl.

CSDB serves students and their families who are deaf, blind, or both. CSDB also coordinates the Colorado Home Intervention Program (CHIP) that serves deaf and hard of hearing students from birth to three years old within their home. CSDB provides outreach services to support students, families, and school districts throughout Colorado.

== Campus ==
The facility has dormitories for students.
