= Phillip A. Emery =

American deaf educator (1830–1907)

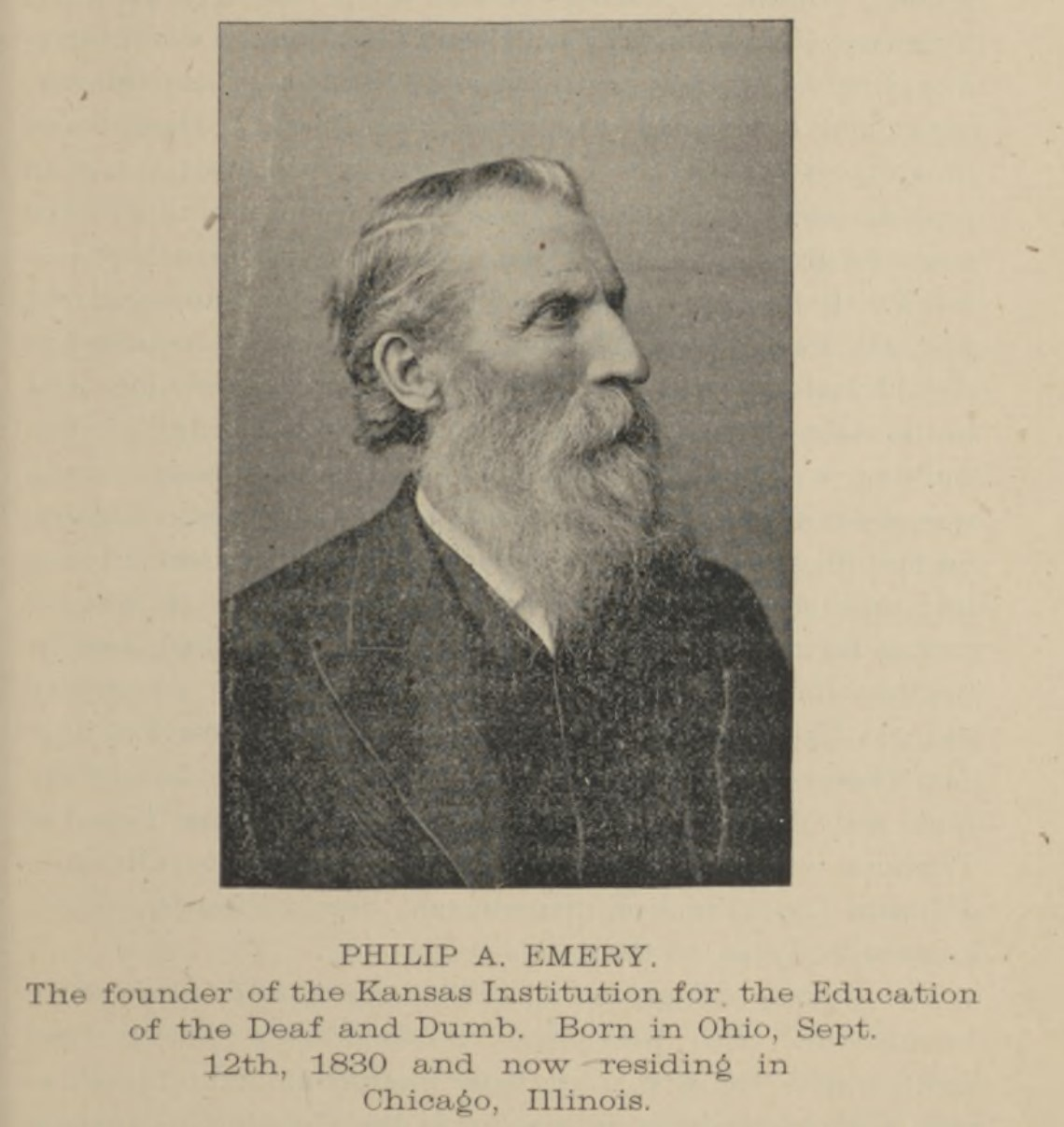
Philip Emery

Phillip A. Emery (1830–1907) was an American deaf educator and non-fiction author who founded the Kansas School for the Deaf.

Emery was born on September 12, 1830, and became deaf at age three. He was largely self-taught until he attended three years of school at the Indiana School for the Deaf. Emery created several inventions as a child. Emery taught briefly at Indiana School for the Deaf from 1857 to 1860 before traveling to Kansas in 1860.

Emery founded the Kansas School for the Deaf in 1861, in an attic of a small house in Baldwin City, Kansas, several miles from the current location of the school.

Emery eventually moved to Chicago, Illinois, where he helped found the Chicago Day School in 1874 and served as its first principal in 1875. Emery authored at least six nonfiction books. Two of his books were about dream interpretations and a third was titled Landscape of History. Emery's other three books were about contemporary social issues. Emery died in Los Angeles, California, in March 1907.
