= William Willard (deaf educator) =

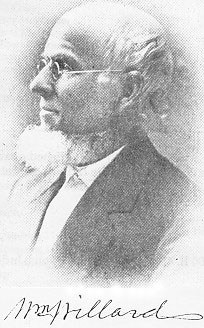
William Willard

William Willard (November 1, 1809 – February 15, 1881) founded Indiana's school for the deaf in Indianapolis, Indiana, which later became the Indiana School for the Deaf. He was one of the most important deaf persons in the deaf community.

== Biography ==
Willard was born on November 1, 1809, in Brattleboro, Vermont. He grew up in Rockingham, Vermont, and attended American School for the Deaf in Hartford, Connecticut. During his schooling, he was a student of the famous Laurent Clerc, who was and is considered the "Father of Deaf Education" in America. After he graduated, he taught at a school for the deaf in Columbus, Ohio, which is called Ohio School for the Deaf. There, he met Eliza Young, who was also deaf and a teacher, and married her. Eventually, the both of them traveled to Indianapolis, Indiana, and William proposed the establishment of a school for the Deaf.

He and Eliza traveled throughout the state of Indiana on horseback, recruiting potential deaf students in order to form a school. On October 1, 1843, was the first day of school, and William's school had twelve students. William and his wife, Eliza, both were teachers. Eventually, Indiana passed a law that established the school as a state institution, and after William became Principal of the school, Indiana passed a law that officially declared Indiana School for the Deaf as the sixth state school for the Deaf to provide free education to all deaf and hard of hearing students.
