= Olive Sanxay =

American writer

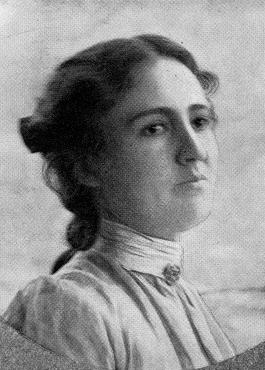
- Olive Sanxay, from a 1902 publication
- Born: June 1, 1873; Jefferson County, Indiana, U.S.
- Died: October 11, 1965 (aged 92); Madison State Hospital, Madison, Indiana, U.S.
- Other names: Olive Sanxey
- Occupation: Writer

Olive Sanxay (June 1, 1873 – October 11, 1965), also seen as Olive Sanxey, was an American poet and short story writer.

== Early life ==
Sanxay was born in Ravenswood in Jefferson County, Indiana, the tenth and final child of Henry Campbell Sanxay and Sarah (Sally) Parker Stringfellow Sanxay. She began to lose her hearing as a girl. She graduated from Madison High School in 1890. In 1895, she was admitted to the Indiana School for the Deaf.

== Career ==
Sanxay taught at the Indiana State School for the Deaf, and wrote stories and poems as a young woman. Two of her poems, "Genius" and "Sabbath Chimes", were included in Poets and Poetry of Indiana (1900). "A Summer Girl" appeared in Indiana Writers of Poems and Prose (1902). She wrote poem, "The Dream and the Deed", for a 1907 ceremony at the school, and it was included in the Indiana State School's annual report in 1908. In 1918, one of her poems was included in the poem-a-day collection The Hoosier Year of 366 Indiana Writers and Speakers. Other poems by Sanxay appeared in newspapers, including the Indianapolis Star, the Indianapolis Journal and The Inter Ocean. She also published at least one story, "Jim's Baby" (1899).

== Personal life ==
Sanxay was institutionalized at the Southeastern Indiana Hospital for the Insane (later Madison State Hospital) in Madison, Indiana, for many years. She died there in 1965, aged 92 years.
