= University High School (Irvine, California) =

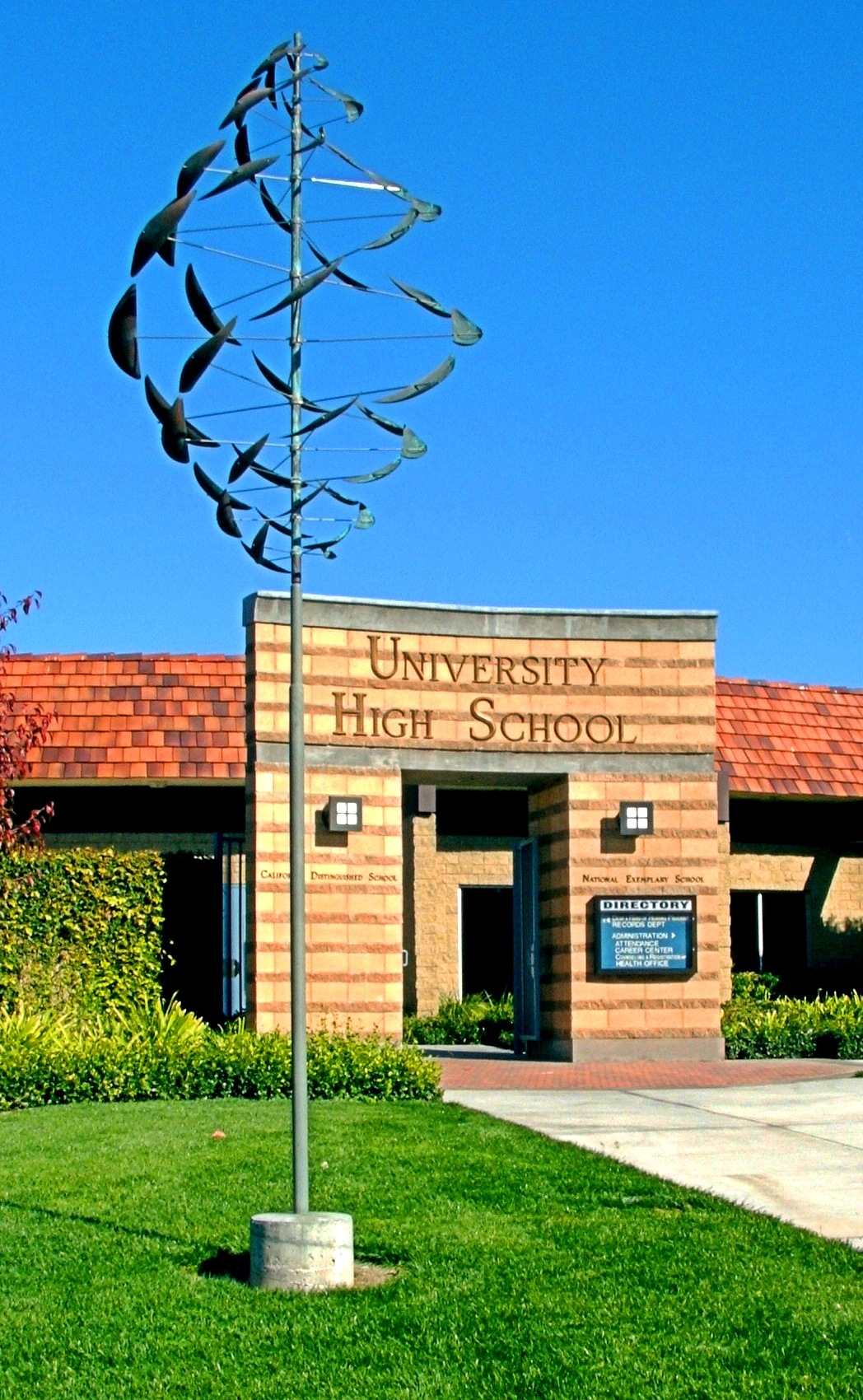
- Entrance to University High School

Location
- 4771 Campus Drive; Irvine, California 92612; United States; 33.6517°N 117.8222°W

Information
- Type: Comprehensive high school
- Motto: Forward as One
- Established: September 1970; 56 years ago
- School district: Irvine Unified
- NCES District ID: 0684500
- CEEB code: 051-984
- NCES School ID: 068450007067
- Principal: Michael Georgino
- Teaching staff: 83.34(on an FTE basis)
- Grades: 9-12
- Enrollment: 2,307 (2024-2025)
- Student to teacher ratio: 26.71
- Colors: Navy Blue, Columbia Blue, and White
- Athletics conference: Pacific Coast League
- Nickname: Trojans
- Newspaper: The Sword and Shield
- Yearbook: The Odyssey
- Website: universityhigh.iusd.org

University High School (also known as UHS or "Uni") is one of six public high schools serving grades 9-12 in the city of Irvine, California, United States. It was established in 1970 and is situated on 55 acres (22 ha) of land in the southwestern portion of the city, adjacent to the University of California, Irvine (UCI).

The school comprises six main academic buildings, a performing arts theater, a band room for instrumental music, a swimming pool, eight tennis courts, an indoor gymnasium supplemented with other indoor athletic facilities, a stadium, and several practice fields. Housed within the facilities are the departments of English, world languages, math, science, social science, instrumental music, art, industrial technology, athletics, physical education, English proficiency programs, special education, and the Orange County Deaf and Hard of Hearing Program. The school colors are navy blue, Columbia blue, and white. The school mascot is Tommy the Trojan.

University High School was named the best public high school in California and 8th best public high school in America in 2011 by Newsweek. University was also the highest ranked institution on the list that was not a charter or magnet school.

== Academics ==
University High School has consistently made Newsweeks list of Best High Schools, most recently ranking 102nd in 2013. It also ranked 117th in 2005, 156th in 2006, 76th in 2007, 156th in 2008 and 2009, 146th in 2010, and 8th in 2011. It also ranked 182nd on U.S. News & World Report's list of Best High Schools in 2013.

In May 1987, University High School was recognized by the U.S. Department of Education as an exemplary school in the Secondary School Recognition Program. In 1988 and 1992, UHS was similarly recognized as a California State Distinguished School. University was accredited by Western Association of Schools and Colleges (WASC) for six years in 2004 and also in 2010.

=== Academic teams ===
University High School is noted for its various academic teams, including Physics Bowl, Science Bowl, Science Olympiad, Ethics Bowl, Academic Decathlon, Model United Nations, International Space Settlement Design Competition, Speech and Debate and math competitions (including ARML, and Math Day at the Beach). These teams generally attain high scores, often winning prestigious awards such as Best Club Delegation at Berkeley Model United Nations (BMUN) in 2009, 2010, 2011, 2014, and 2018 or first place at Math Day at the Beach for three years in a row (2008–2010). Its Academic Decathlon team reached the state finals of the California Academic Decathlon for the first time in 2018.

University High School also has numerous students named semi-finalists for the United States Physics, Math, Biology, and Chemistry Olympiads. The school's Science Bowl team also advanced to the national competition in 2013, 2014, 2018 through 2021, and 2023, placing 4th nationally in 2013 and 2nd in 2023. University has also had Intel Science Talent Search finalists and semi-finalists, Siemens Competition semi-finalists, and categorical winners at ISEF.

University High has had many students participate in the Irvine CubeSat Stem Program, as part of the NASA ELaNa program where they were able to contribute to building and launching multiple nanosatellites. Students who were similarly interested in aerospace engineering also participated in University High's Rocketry Club. Students participated in TARC (The American Rocketry Challenge), by building and launching model rockets. Furthermore, University High has sent a team to the International Space Settlement Design Competition (ISSDC) for five consecutive years and has won the national competition in several divisions of the National History Day contest.

University is home to a successful Mock Trial program, having won three of the last five county championships. University High School is also home to the largest Junior Classical League in the nation and a noteworthy chapter of the Junior State of America.

=== Deaf program ===
Together with Venado Middle School, University High School hosts the Regional Deaf and Hard of Hearing Program for the Orange County Department of Education, a program that brings in deaf and hard of hearing students from all of Orange County as well as some students from nearby counties. The program provides interpreters, notetakers, and other special services, and serves as "a model of regionalized programming nationwide".

In 2009, University High won first place in the Deaf Academic Bowl.

== Performing Arts ==
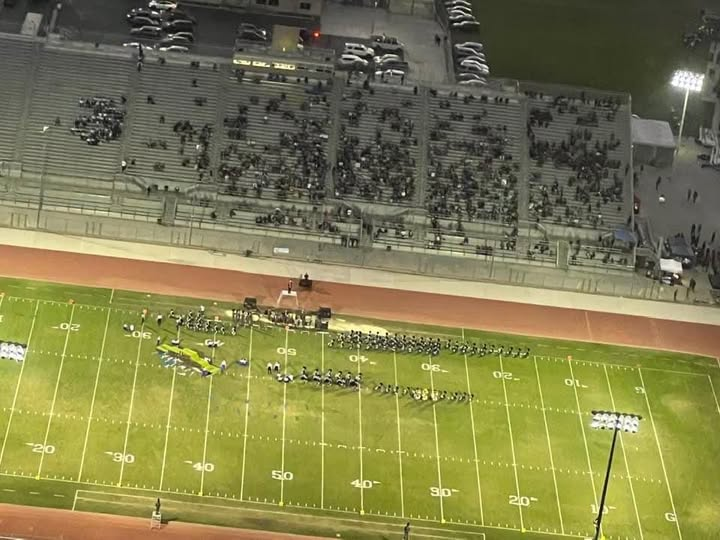
The University High School Marching Trojan Regiment photographed by a police helicopter while performing their 2022 field show at Mayfair High School.

The school's marching band and color guard currently competes in the 5A division with over 140 members. In 2009, the UHS marching band formally changed their name from the "University High School Marching Band and Colorguard" to the "University High School Marching Trojan Regiment," or the "UHSMTR." In their 2010-2011 season, the group won an unprecedented five out of six sweepstakes trophies at the Mayfair High School Tournament. In their 2024-2025, the UHSMTR won 1st place at the Irvine Invitational Field Tournament.

University High School is home to a colorguard program. During the fall, the colorguard accompanies the marching band in its competitive field show. In the winter and spring, the colorguard branches off and performs at competitions independently. In 2001, the University winterguard took home a gold medal in their division at the Winter Guard Association of Southern California Championships.

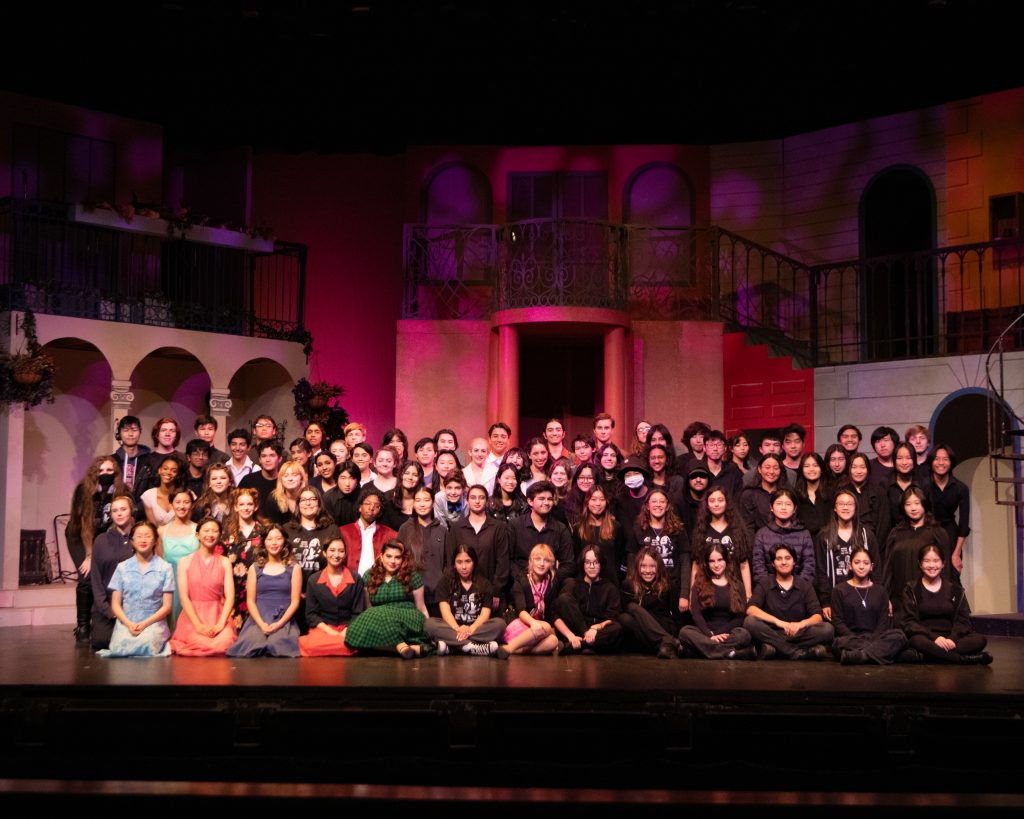
The cast and company of Evita, University High School's 2024 spring musical in front of their set of Buenos Aires.

In addition to the marching band, University High offers students many other opportunities in instrumental and choral music, including four concert bands, four orchestras, three jazz bands, multiple choirs choirs, and an a-cappella group. Its orchestra and band students are often accepted into all-southern, all-state, and all-national ensembles, as well as other honor ensembles like the Pacific Symphony Youth Wind Ensemble. In the winter, members of the drumline and pit, as well as members of the wind and string ensembles, oftentimes opt to be in the winter percussion ensemble, performing percussive music indoors.

In 2013, University High School's symphonic orchestra won second place at the ASTA All-National Orchestra Festival in Providence, Rhode Island.

The school's theater program puts on annual plays and musicals, and its dance program performs at school events, community events, and concerts. Under the direction of Ranae Bettger, the University High School Theater Arts Program (Also known as Uni Theatre Arts or "UTA") puts on an annual fall play, spring musical, and oftentimes a summer practicum, with students working over the summer to perform a show when the school year starts.

University High School is also home to a chapter of the Comedy Sportz (CSz) High School League, in the form of a school competitive improv team. The UHS CSz team puts on monthly performances in the theater, and as of 2025 began having their monthly showings in the little theater. The matches oftentimes have seasonal or quippy themes, and they play improvised games against a variety of opponents, ranging from "volleys" with other schools to matchups with the school's Associated Student Body.

== Athletics ==
University High School offers more than 24 official athletics teams with numerous niche sports offered through school clubs. Some of the most popular sports include football, tennis, water polo, swimming, track and field, soccer, lacrosse, wrestling, and basketball.

The University High School tennis teams have been especially prominent on campus, with the boys' junior varsity team going undefeated in 191 consecutive matches over multiple seasons. In addition, the boys' varsity team won the CIF championship five years in a row (from 2010 to 2014) and had a record of 137 wins and one loss in those five years. Numerous varsity team members are nationally ranked and are often recruited to top Division I NCAA programs. The girls' tennis team is notable as well, reaching the CIF Finals on numerous occasions and winning several Pacific Coast League championships in recent years. The boys' water polo team also performed well in 2021, winning PCL undefeated for the first time since 1991.

== Student body ==
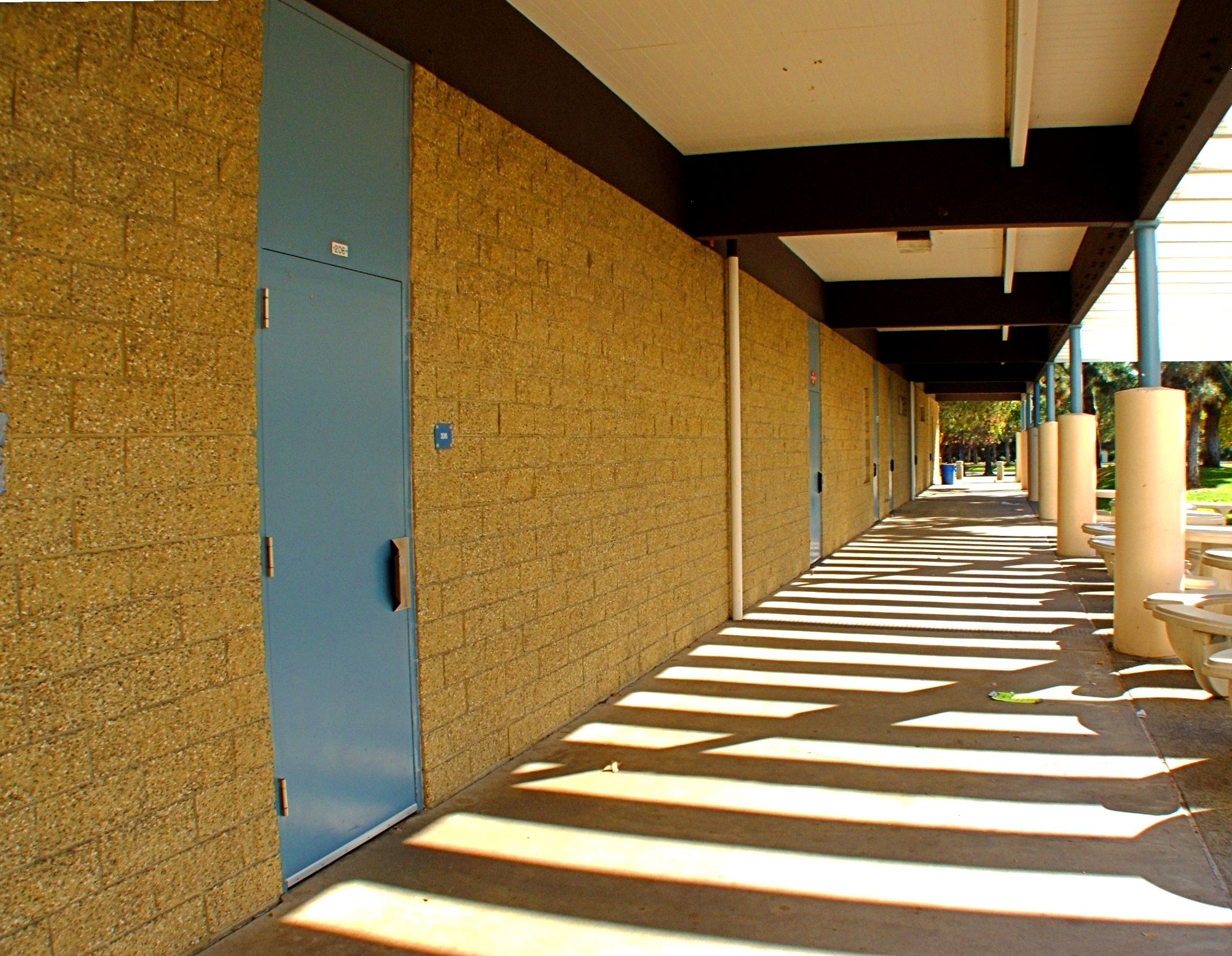
The 200-Building classrooms in front of the office.

Among the 2,363 students enrolled in the 2024–25 school year, 38.21% were Asian, 31.13% Caucasian, 13.58% Hispanic/Latino, 2.45% African American, 1.94% Filipino/Pacific Islander, 0.08% American Indian, and 12.61% Other/Multi-Ethnic. As of 2013, University High School is attended by students from seventy-two countries who speak fifty-two different languages.

96% of the Class of 2024 UHS graduates entered post-secondary institutions of which 55% entered four-year universities and colleges. 41% of the graduates entered community colleges.

In 1992, Charles Keith, the assistant principal of University High School, stated that over 30% of the students were not native English speakers, that the students had origins from 54 countries, and that the students spoke 26 languages. In 1994, 54% of the students were white, 37% were Asian, 4.5% were Hispanic or Latino, and 3% were black.

=== Neighborhoods served ===
As of 1994, most students originate from the University of California, Irvine area.

Residents of the UC Irvine student family housing units (Palo Verde and Verano Place) are zoned to University High School. University High School serves the neighborhoods of University Park, Quail Hill, Laguna Altura, Turtle Ridge, Turtle Rock, Shady Canyon, some areas of Westpark, and apartment complexes near UCI.
