= California School for the Deaf, Riverside =

Coordinates: 33.9455°N 117.3820°W

- Riverside, California; United States

Information
- Type: Public
- Established: 1953
- Superintendent: April McArthur
- Faculty: 80
- Grades: K-12
- Enrollment: 400
- Colors: Scarlet and grey
- Athletics conference: CIF - Southern Section; Arrowhead League
- Mascot: Cubs
- Website: csdr-cde.ca.gov

The California School for the Deaf, Riverside (CSD-R or CSDR) is a school for deaf children located in Riverside, California. The school educates children from all over Southern California. Its companion school in Northern California is California School for the Deaf, Fremont (CSD-F or CSDF).

== History ==
On March 26, 1946, California Assembly Bill 75 was signed by Governor Earl Warren, future United States Supreme Court Chief Justice, authorizing appropriations to establish the Southern California School for the Deaf, later renamed the California School for the Deaf, Riverside. In May, 1948, the State Department of Education in Sacramento chose Riverside as the site for the new school on the Arlington Avenue agricultural property. The school began to accept students on February 2, 1953. Perry E. Seely (1886–1949) (himself deaf) is the founding father of today's CSDR.

In 1951, Dr. Richard G. Brill became the school's first superintendent, a position he served for 26 years. In 1958, the student population reached 500.

In 1977, Dr. Robert Lennan became the second school superintendent. He oversaw implementation of an individualized education plan (IEP) as required by federal law.

In 1989, Dr. Kenneth Randall took over as the school's new head.

In 2000, Dr. Rachel Stone, became the fourth school chief, and the first deaf superintendent.

In 2001, Mr. Harold Kund became the fifth school superintendent. His administration period was characterized by a rebuilding program on campus. Kund retired in 2005.

In 2006, Mal Grossinger was selected as the sixth superintendent of CSDR. He was the second deaf superintendent to lead CSDR.

From 2014 to 2016, Scott Kerby, division director of State Special Schools, served as interim superintendent. He implemented new programs while conducting an intensive superintendent recruit process.

In 2016, Dr. Nancy Hlibok Amann, through an extensive community-based interview process, was selected to lead the school as its seventh superintendent. Dr. Amann comes from one of the Deaf community's best-known and celebrated families.

== Admissions ==
Students may attend the school if their local school district refers them to CSDR. Eleven counties are in CSDR's eligibility area.

== Campus ==
The school has dormitory facilities. Students are eligible if the commute to and from the school is over one hour each way.

== Athletics ==
The school has an American football team, which uses American sign language to communicate on the field. The 2024 book The Boys of Riverside tells the story of the deaf team's journey to state football championships in 2022 and 2023.

In 2021 Kelly Clarkson donated 25,000 dollars to the football team, funding the new football stadium.

The schools athletic teams consist of the cheerleading, cross country, varsity and junior varsity volleyball, boys and girls basketball, wrestling, softball, and track and field.

== Notable alumni ==
- Sean Berdy, actor
- Ryan Lane, class of 2007; actor
- John Maucere, actor

== See also ==
- University High School (Irvine, California), which hosts Orange County's Regional Deaf and Hard of Hearing Program
