= Texas School for the Deaf =

School for the deaf in Austin, Texas, United States

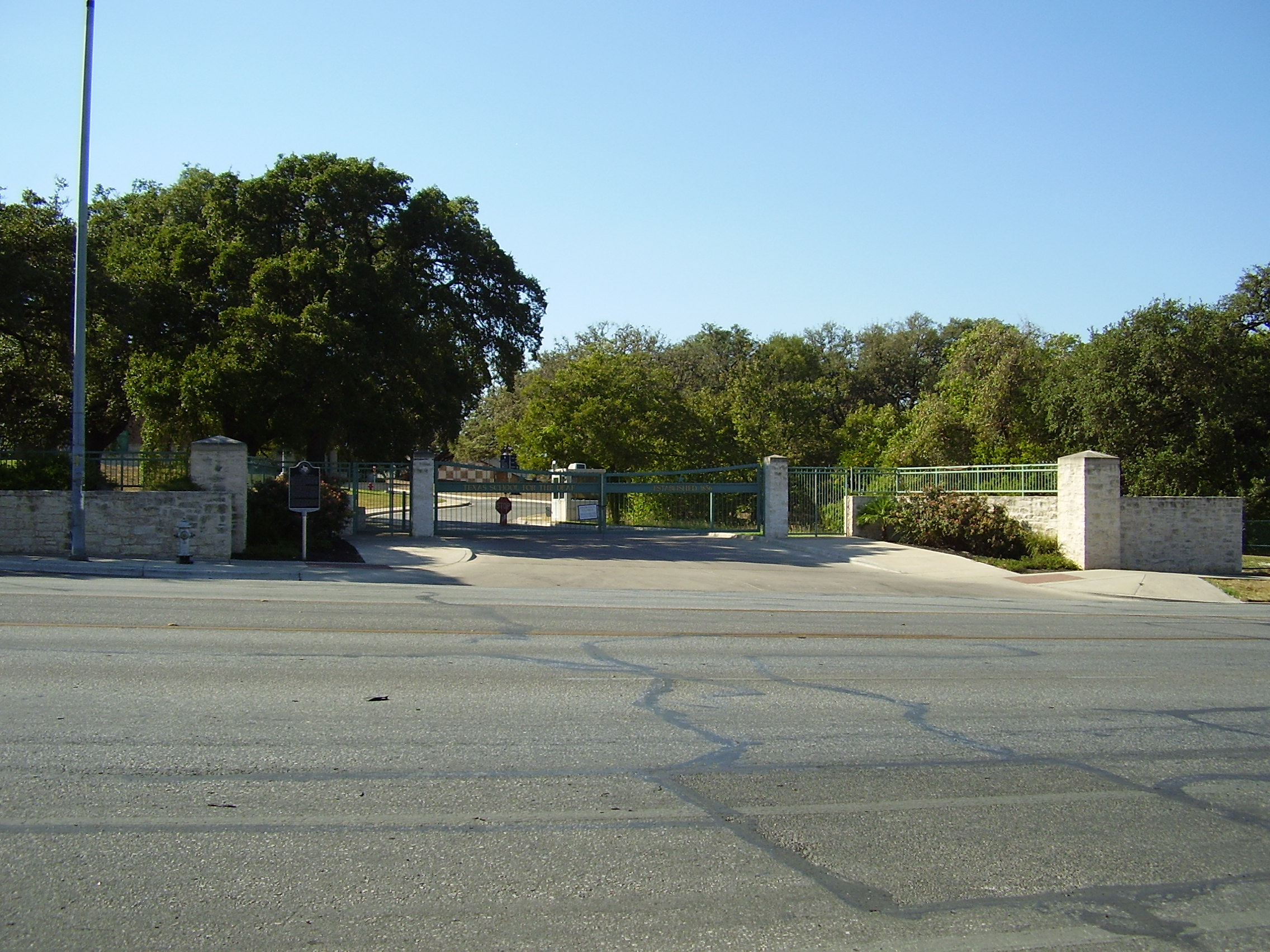

Location
- 1102 South Congress Avenue; Austin, Texas 78704; United States; 30.252858°N 97.751080°W

Information
- Type: Special education school
- Motto: Learn. Grow. Belong.
- Established: 1856
- School board: TSD Governing Board
- NCES District ID: 4800253
- Educational authority: Texas Education Agency
- Superintendent: Peter L. Bailey
- CEEB code: 440322
- NCES School ID: 480025309537
- Grades: Pre-K–12
- Enrollment: 500 (2024-2025)
  - Pre-kindergarten: 60
  - Kindergarten: 20
  - Grade 1: 13
  - Grade 2: 12
  - Grade 3: 27
  - Grade 4: 25
  - Grade 5: 19
  - Grade 6: 34
  - Grade 7: 35
  - Grade 8: 26
  - Grade 9: 38
  - Grade 10: 50
  - Grade 11: 46
  - Grade 12: 95
- Campus type: Urban
- Colors: Blue and White
- Athletics: Yes
- Team name: Rangers
- Rival: New Mexico School for the Deaf
- Graduates (2024): 47
- Languages: American Sign Language, English
- Website: Official Website

Texas School for the Deaf (TSD) is a state-operated primary and secondary school for deaf children in Austin, Texas. Opened in 1857 "in an old frame house, three log cabins, and a smokehouse", it is the oldest continually-operated public school in Texas. The school struggled under inadequate funding during the American Civil War, and its aftermath, with the students eating food that they grew themselves on the school farm. In 1951, the State Board of Education assumed oversight of the school.

== History ==
The Texas Legislature created the Texas Institution for the Education of the Deaf and Dumb in 1856, with five trustees appointed by the Governor of Texas governing the new institution. Initially the superintendent of the deaf school was appointed by the board of trustees. The school opened in January of the following year, occupying its current campus. By the summer of 1857 there were 11 students enrolled, and until around 1870 the enrollment was 13. During the Civil War, teachers and students made wool clothes and farmed in order to support themselves because the school was unable to pay salaries to the teachers.

Around 1868 the school was renamed to the Texas Deaf and Dumb Institution. Around that time the law regarding who appoints the superintendent changed; now the governor of Texas had the power to directly appoint the superintendent. In 1871 the name was changed to Texas Institution for the Deaf and Dumb. A state printing office was established at the TSD in 1876. The institution's name changed again to Texas Deaf and Dumb Asylum around 1877.

Originally TSD only served white students and had white teachers. Black students attended the Texas Blind, Deaf, and Orphan School, which had been established in 1887. As a result, the two schools developed divergent sign-language dialects.

The school's deaf-blind department opened in 1900. The school received its current name during 1911. The Texas Board of Control received power over TSD in 1919, the year it was formed. By 1923 it had grown into the second-largest school for the deaf in the United States. In 1939 the deaf-blind department was transferred to the Texas School for the Blind and Visually Impaired (TSBVI). The school had 450 students in the mid-1940s. TSD was placed under the authority of the Board for Texas State Hospitals and Special Schools, under its current name, in 1949. In 1951 the Texas Education Agency received jurisdiction over the TSD.

In 1965 the black and white deaf schools merged, and the student bodies were integrated the following year. The school retained comparatively fewer black teachers than white teachers, and, of the black teachers who were retained, the majority left within two years. The multi-handicapped deaf students department and the early childhood and elementary programs of the combined TSD moved to the former black school, which became the TSD's east campus. The sign language used by the white students became dominant over the sign language used by black students.

In 1979 the Texas Legislature transferred responsibility of the TSD to an independent board; the board members include deaf persons, parents of deaf people, and professionals in the deafness sector. 51% of the members of the board are required to be deaf people.

TSD became a state agency in 1981, and it also received the designation of being an independent school district.

== Campus ==
The school's 67.5-acre (27.3 ha) site, located along South Congress, houses a 458,000-square-foot (42,500 m^{2}), $65 million (as of 1989) campus designed by Barnes Architects, a company headquartered in Austin. The funds to build the campus were spent in 1989, and Barnes won an award for the campus design in 1999. A previous physical plant was built in 1955, and some older buildings were razed that year.

The former black deaf school, located along Airport Boulevard, became the TSD East Campus in 1965. The State of Texas had built 11 buildings at the site, formerly occupied by the Montopolis Drive-in Theater, for $1.5 million in 1961. These buildings had a capacity of 1,208 students. After the 2000–2001 school year TSD sold this property to the City of Austin, and the two campuses were consolidated.

== Gallery ==
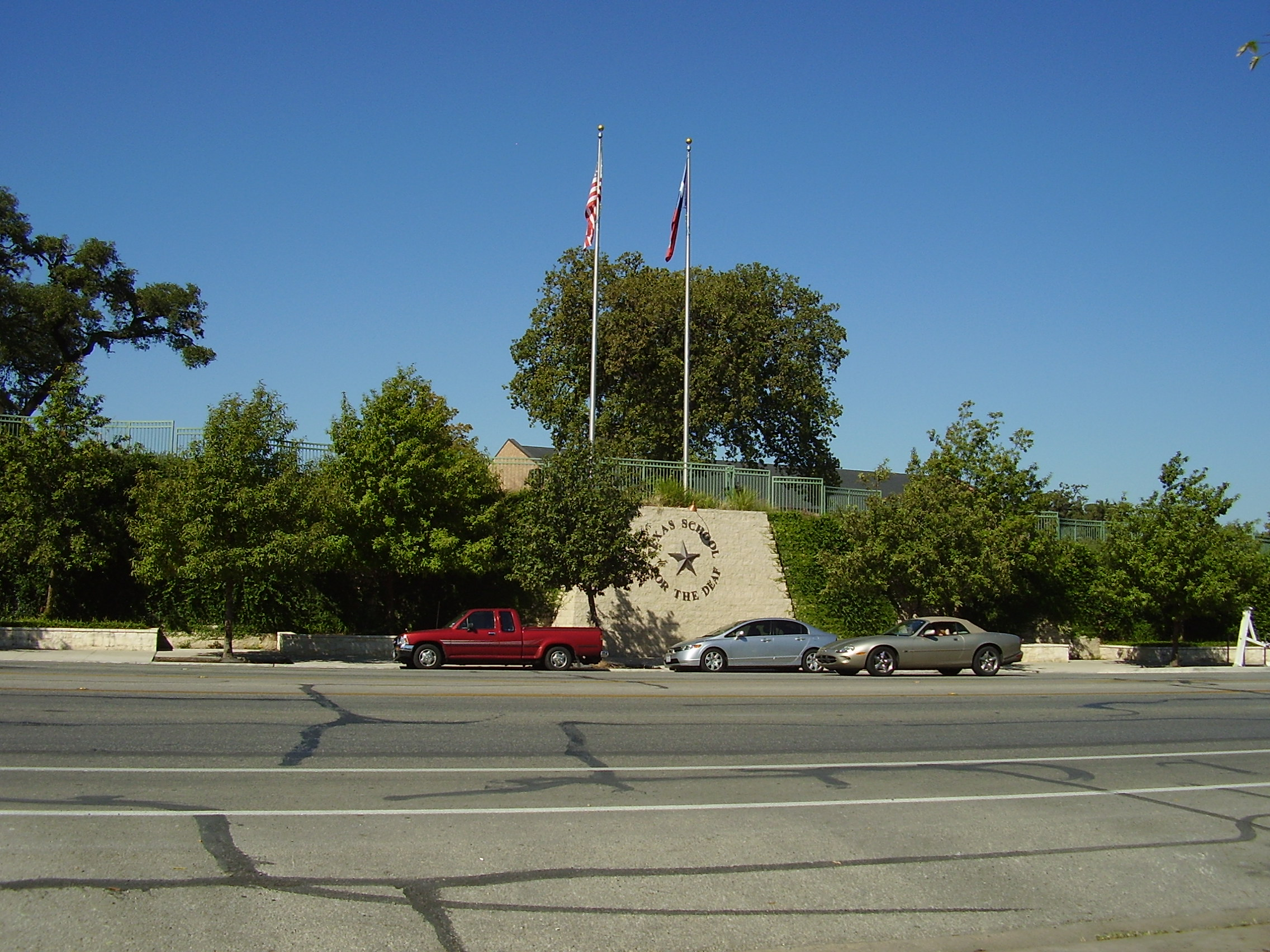
Texas School for the Deaf

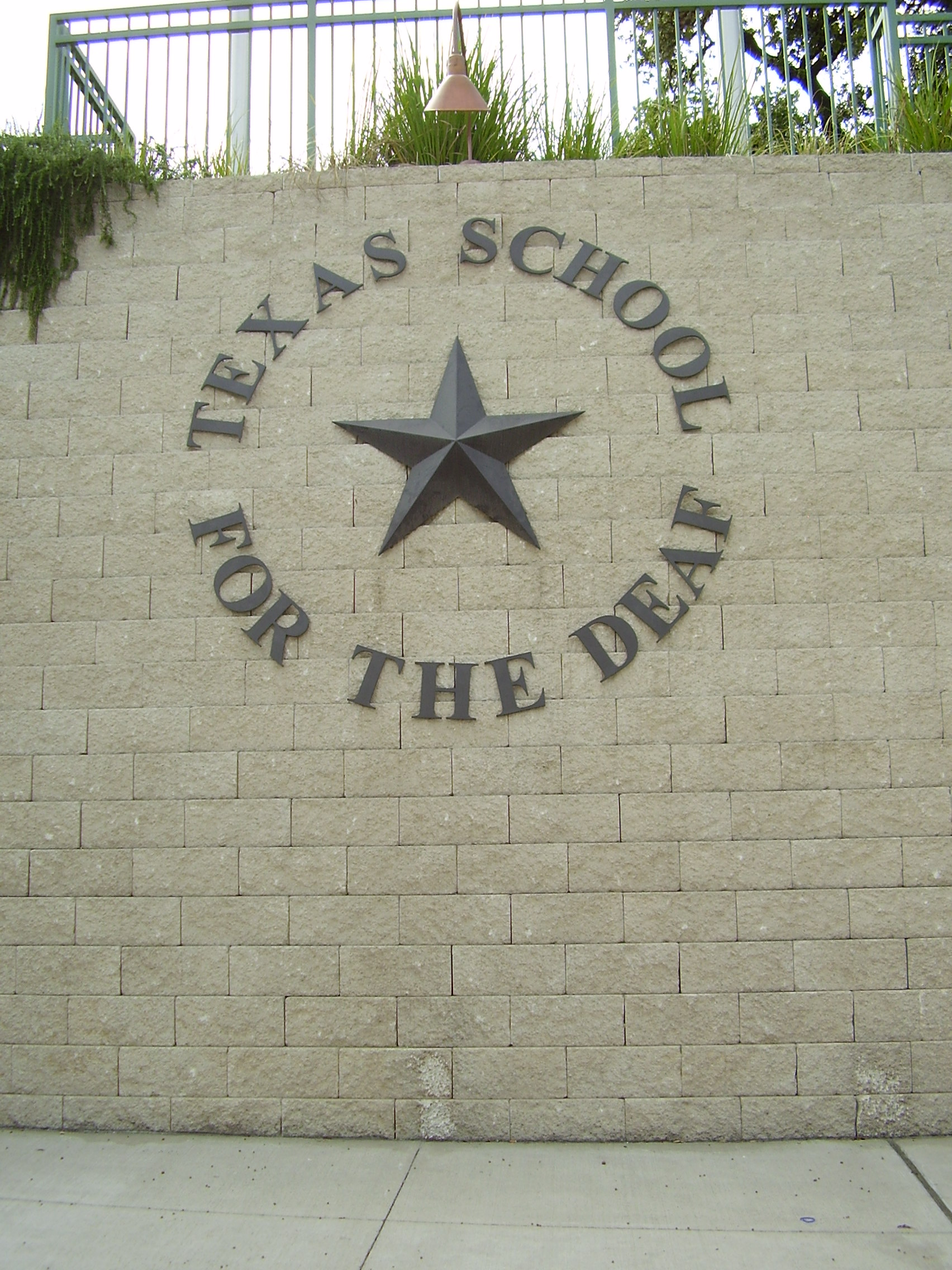
Texas School for the Deaf

== See also ==
- Texas School for the Blind and Visually Impaired
