= Kansas School for the Deaf =

School in Olathe, Kansas, U.S.

Coordinates: 38°52′57″N 94°48′46″W

- Olathe, Kansas; United States

Information
- Former name: Asylum for the Deaf and Dumb
- School type: Deaf School
- Established: 1861; 165 years ago
- Founder: Phillip A. Emery
- Grades: K–12
- Website: www.kansasdeaf.gov

The Kansas School For the Deaf, is a K–12 school, located in downtown Olathe, Kansas. In 1861, it became the first school for the deaf established in the state of Kansas, and today it remains the largest. Originally named the "Asylum for the Deaf and Dumb", the name has been changed several times to conform to prevailing sensibilities about deafness. Students and staff often refer to the school as "KSD".

== History ==
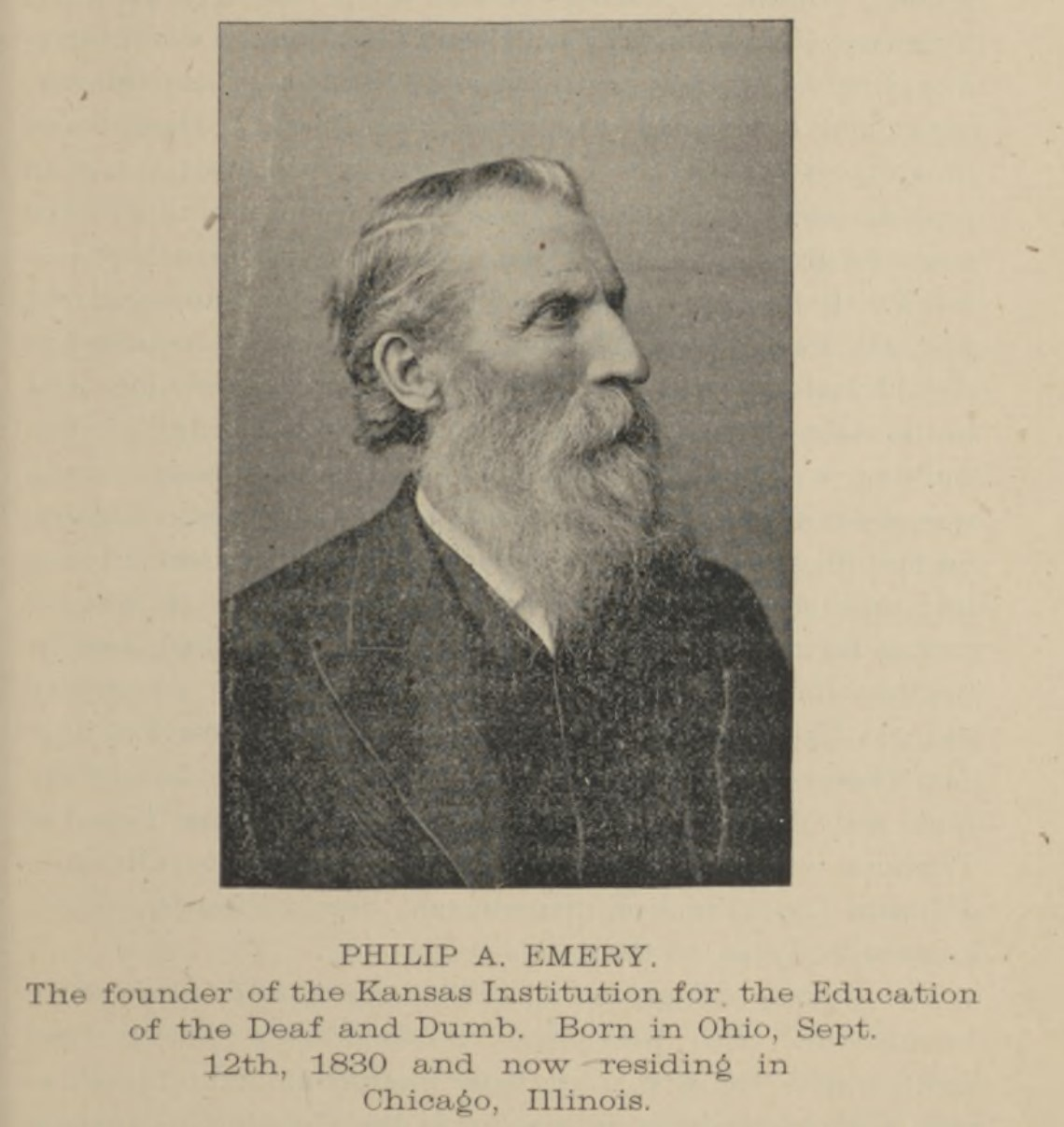
Philip Emery, founder of Kansas School for the Deaf

The school was founded in 1861 by Phillip A. Emery, a deaf person who had taught briefly at Indiana School for the Deaf before coming to Kansas the previous year. He began educating deaf students from the attic of a small house in Baldwin City, Kansas, about 25 miles southwest of its current location.

Within five years, the school received state funding and a new location in Olathe. In 1885 the thriving institution changed its name to Kansas Institution for the Education of the Deaf and Dumb. Its emphasis, influenced by the work of Thomas Hopkins Gallaudet, was on integrating deaf students into society, rather than housing them apart from it.

From the beginning KSD emphasized vocational training. Leather working, baking, sewing, printmaking and other trades were incorporated into the curriculum. Vocational training continues to be an integral part of the KSD experience to this day.

== Sports ==
Like many schools, KSD encourages students to participate in athletics. It adopted sports very early on, The football team began in 1899, and the basketball team in 1903. Perhaps the most famous KSD alumnus is Dummy Taylor who pitched for the New York Giants from 1900 to 1908. In addition to football and baseball, the school has also had active wrestling, track, basketball, cheerleading and volleyball programs. Athletic teams play both area public schools and other state deaf schools from the region. KSD boys won the 1978 National Deaf Football Championship and 1978 National Deaf Basketball Championship. The KSD girls won the 1978 National Deaf Volleyball Championship.

== Campus ==
The school has dormitories for students who live far from the campus. The Stanley D. Roth east and west wings house dormitories.
