= Indiana School for the Deaf =

Location
- 1200 East 42nd Street; Indianapolis, Indiana 46205; United States

Information
- Type: Schools for the Deaf, State school
- Established: 1843; 183 years ago
- Superintendent: Kim Kause
- Assistant Superintendent of Education: Kim Kause
- Grades: Pre-K-12
- Enrollment: 350 (2025)
- Campus size: 80 acres
- Campus type: Suburban
- Colors: Orange and Black
- Sports: Football, Volleyball, Cross Country, Basketball, Wrestling, Baseball, Softball, Swimming, Track and Field, Cheerleading
- Mascot: Orioles
- Athletic Director: Peter Leccese

- Indiana School for the Deaf
- U.S. National Register of Historic Places
- U.S. Historic district
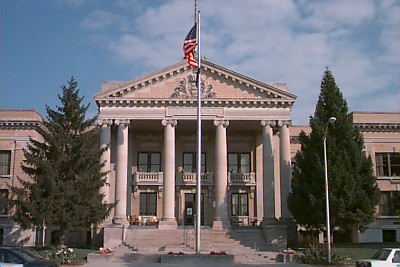
- Front of the main building

- Location within Indianapolis Location within Indiana Location within the United States
- Location: 1200 E. 42nd St., Indianapolis, Indiana
- Coordinates: 39°50′6″N 86°8′16″W
- Area: 14 acres (5.7 ha)
- Built: 1911
- Architect: Rubush & Hunter; Et al.
- Architectural style: Classical Revival
- Website: deafhoosiers.com
- NRHP reference No.: 91000790
- Added to NRHP: June 27, 1991

Indiana School for the Deaf (ISD) is a fully accredited school for the deaf and hard of hearing, located in Indianapolis, Indiana, United States.

== History ==
=== Origins and founding (1843–1860) ===
William Willard, a Deaf educator trained under Laurent Clerc, founded what would become the Indiana School for the Deaf (ISD) in the mid-19th century. In the early 1800s, formal schooling for deaf individuals was emerging in the United States; the first school opened in 1817 in Connecticut, and by the 1840s, Indiana's leaders recognized the need for a local institution. Willard had lost his hearing as a child due to illness and attended the American Asylum in Hartford. By 1843 he was teaching at the Ohio School for the Deaf when he was invited to establish a school in Indiana. He and his wife, Eliza Young Willard, who was also Deaf, traveled across Indiana on horseback to recruit students, motivated by parents like William Bales, a Vermillion County sheriff whose deaf son had to attend an out-of-state school. Their efforts culminated on October 1, 1843, when Willard opened a private school for deaf children in Indianapolis with a first class of about a dozen pupils. The Willards initially taught without pay to prove that deaf children could be educated, prompting Governor Samuel Bigger to urge state support for the fledgling school.

In January 1844 the Indiana General Assembly officially chartered Willard's school as a state institution, originally named the Indiana Asylum for the Education of the Deaf and Dumb. Willard became the first principal of the school, which at first operated in a rented facility in downtown Indianapolis. However, prevailing attitudes of the era assumed that a deaf person could not capably administer an institution. In 1846, the legislature appointed a hearing educator, James S. Brown of Ohio, to replace Willard as principal (a position soon retitled superintendent). This decision was made despite Willard's successful leadership and reflected the endemic discrimination of the time: trustees felt a Deaf administrator was inherently disqualified. Willard, while disappointed, stayed on as an instructor and assistant administrator until ill health forced his retirement in 1864. Under Brown and subsequent leaders, the school expanded. In 1847–1850 the state erected its first permanent campus for the "asylum", a large Greek Revival style complex at East Washington Street and State Avenue on Indianapolis's east side. When this new facility opened in October 1850, the school had already grown to serve dozens of students, and its name was shortened to the Indiana Institution for the Education of the Deaf and Dumb. This campus, a stately building with a central five-story tower and flanking wings, would house ISD's operations for the next sixty years.

=== Expansion and reform (1860–1900) ===
By the post-Civil War era, the Indiana Institution for the Deaf and Dumb was thriving and evolving in its educational mission. The administration, led for 27 years by superintendent Thomas MacIntire from 1852 to 1879, placed a dual emphasis on academic instruction and practical training. In addition to teaching standard subjects, the school developed extensive vocational programs to prepare students for employment, a reflection of 19th-century beliefs that deaf individuals should learn trades for self-sufficiency. By 1854 a dedicated Mechanical Department was established, featuring workshops for carpentry, shoemaking, printing, and other trades. Female students were instructed in domestic arts like sewing and tailoring, while male students learned skills such as gardening and machining, in line with gender norms of the period. Students regularly showcased their learning in public exhibitions and demonstrations, even printing a school newspaper (the Indiana Deaf-Mute Journal, first issued in 1887 and later renamed The Silent Hoosier), that helped educate the public and lawmakers about the capabilities of deaf pupils. The sale of student-made goods provided a modest income to offset costs, and annual reports stressed that training in "useful trades" was as vital as academic and moral education in the school's program. By 1893, ISD had organized its coursework into primary, intermediate, and advanced divisions, roughly equivalent to elementary, middle, and high school levels, alongside the industrial department, ensuring a comprehensive curriculum for its growing student body.

During the late 19th century, ISD also grappled with pedagogical debates that swept through deaf education worldwide. From its founding, instruction had been delivered in American Sign Language (ASL), the visual language of the Deaf community, which early leaders like Willard championed as the most natural and effective medium for deaf students. Sign language was the primary mode of communication in the classroom throughout the mid-1800s, and the school became a center of Deaf culture where students quickly became fluent in ASL. Notably, some ISD alumni joined the faculty during this period, demonstrating the value of deaf educators as role models; for example, John L. Houdyshell, an 1855 graduate, became the school's first long-tenured deaf teacher, serving 1868–1885. However, after the 1860s, influenced by a rising oralist movement, ISD began to incorporate speech training. In 1868 the school's board recommended offering instruction in lip reading and articulation to those students who might benefit. By the 1880s and 1890s, the administration had formally adopted a "combined method" of education, blending manual communication (signing and finger-spelling) with oral techniques (speech and lip-reading). While signing remained dominant on campus, regular speech classes were introduced, reflecting a compromise between opposing philosophies. Students themselves engaged in this debate: an 1887 article in the Deaf-Mute Journal argued in favor of the manual alphabet over purely gestural signs, asserting that any literate person could learn finger-spelling quickly while complex sign systems took years to master. This spirited dialogue at ISD mirrored the broader national conversation following the 1880 Milan Conference, where educators had controversially proclaimed oralism superior. Ultimately, ISD maintained a balanced approach, never eliminating sign language even as it explored oral education, a decision that helped preserve Deaf culture at the school during an era when many institutions attempted to suppress it.

In addition to academics, the late 19th century saw the emergence of organized extracurricular life at ISD. For much of the 1800s, students had little time for recreation, following a reflection of Victorian work habits and the school's heavy focus on labor and study. In 1870, American laborers toiled around 60 hours per week; accordingly, ISD students' days were highly regimented with classes and manual work. By the 1890s, however, social attitudes and schedules were shifting: the workweek had shortened and leisure time was more common, creating new opportunities for youth athletics. Under Superintendent Alfred T. Johnson in the late 1880s, ISD began to encourage sports and other student activities as a complement to its rigorous training. Johnson himself criticized the earlier practice of "leasing out" student labor to tradesmen, a system he deemed exploitative, and moved to ensure students had time for physical exercise and play. As a result, team sports made their debut at the Indiana institution by the end of the century. The school's first football games were organized in this era, and the earliest known photograph of an ISD football team dates to 1898. In subsequent years, baseball, basketball, and other sports were introduced, enriching campus life. These activities not only promoted fitness and school spirit, but also gave deaf students new avenues to excel and socialize on equal terms. By 1900, ISD had firmly established itself as both an academic institution and a cultural haven: a place where deaf Hoosiers received education, vocational skills, social life, and exposure to a proudly Deaf community that extended beyond the classroom.

=== New campus and early 20th century (1900–1945) ===
The dawn of the 20th century brought transformative growth to ISD. Enrollment continued to rise, straining the old East Washington Street facilities. In 1905 the school's board successfully petitioned the state legislature for a new, larger campus designed to meet modern needs. An 80-acre (32 ha) site of farmland and woods on East 42nd Street north of downtown Indianapolis was acquired in 1906, and local architects Rubush & Hunter were commissioned to plan an expansive "cottage style" school complex. Construction began in 1907 on what would become a state-of-the-art residential school campus. The main building, later known as Alumni Hall and currently as Willard Hall, and several auxiliary buildings were completed over the next few years in a neoclassical red-brick style. The new campus featured a quadrangle layout: matching dormitories for boys and girls faced each other on opposite sides, a central academic building and chapel anchored the grounds, and facilities like the now-defunct dining hall known as Beecher Hall, a hospital, a power plant, laundry, and vocational workshops were arrayed around them. In 1907, as this ambitious project was underway, the Indiana legislature also voted to rename the institution from an "asylum" to the Indiana State School for the Deaf, explicitly reclassifying it as a school rather than a charitable or medical facility. Administrators hailed this change, emphasizing that deaf pupils were "simply students, and as such should not be obliged to pass under an assumed name", distancing the school's image from the outdated notion of an asylum and firmly integrating it into Indiana's public education system. The new campus officially opened in 1911, and the old site was sold to the city, later becoming Willard Park in honor of ISD's founder. With its sprawling green grounds, modern dormitories, and specialized facilities, the 42nd Street campus marked the beginning of a new era. ISD now had one of the most advanced schools for the deaf in the country, built to serve hundreds of students from across Indiana.

Throughout the early 20th century, ISD continued to refine its programs and adapt to contemporary educational standards. The school maintained its combined method of instruction, using both sign language and spoken or written English, and kept pace with pedagogical developments. By the 1920s–1930s, the curriculum at ISD closely mirrored that of hearing public schools in most academic subjects. Students followed courses in math, science, history, literature, and the arts while also receiving training in trades and crafts, reflecting a balance between academic and vocational education. The arts were not neglected. For example, ISD offered art classes (a 1923 photo shows deaf students in a dedicated art classroom) and music appreciation through visual and tactile means. Extracurricular activities expanded as well. By the 1940s, ISD fielded competitive sports teams (the boys' basketball team, for instance, was active and coached by faculty by 1941), and students participated in organizations such as literary societies and scouting. The school also embraced new technologies to assist deaf education. In the 1940s, early mechanical hearing aids became available, and ISD was among the schools to introduce these devices for students who had residual hearing. Though bulky by modern standards, these hearing aids, along with training in lip-reading, were incorporated for those who might benefit, supplementing, but never replacing, the visual language foundation. World events such as the two World Wars touched ISD indirectly; while deaf Americans could not serve in the military, many ISD alumni contributed to the war effort on the home front in factories or farms, using skills learned at school. The Great Depression of the 1930s also posed challenges, but state funding kept the school operational and even allowed some campus improvements. By 1942, an official report noted that ISD's offerings and outcomes were on par with Indiana's hearing schools, a point of pride that underscored the school's success in delivering a complete education. At the same time, ISD remained a distinct cultural enclave where generations of deaf students formed lifelong friendships and a shared identity. The early 20th-century investments in infrastructure and pedagogy positioned ISD to enter the mid-20th century as a well-established, forward-looking institution dedicated to both the academic and social development of deaf youth.

=== Late 20th-century developments (1945–2000) ===
In the decades after World War II, the Indiana School for the Deaf continued to adapt and expand amid changing social and educational landscapes. In 1961, the institution's name was simplified to the Indiana School for the Deaf (ISD), dropping the word "State", a symbolic shift that reflected pride in the school's unique identity and mission. By the 1960s, medical advances (such as vaccinations) and special education reforms led to fluctuations in ISD's enrollment. Notably, the rubella epidemic of the early 1960s caused a surge of deaf births, temporarily increasing the student population in the late 1960s and early 1970s. Conversely, the mainstreaming movement of the 1970s and 80s introduced new challenges. Following the federal Education for All Handicapped Children Act of 1975 (Public Law 94-142, later known as IDEA), public schools were required to provide inclusive education for children with disabilities, including those who were deaf. Many deaf students who might once have boarded at ISD instead began attending local schools with interpreters. ISD's leadership responded by emphasizing the advantages of a deaf-centric environment and enhancing programs that could not be easily replicated in mainstream settings. During the 1970s, ISD, like most deaf schools, adopted a philosophy of Total Communication, encouraging the use of all modes of communication—sign language, speech, lip-reading, and auditory aids—to meet each student's needs. This approach evolved by the late 20th century into a bilingual-bicultural model, recognizing American Sign Language as a true language of instruction alongside written English.

ISD also solidified its standing in both the Deaf community and the wider society during this period. The school's alumni and faculty were active in deaf advocacy organizations, and Indianapolis became a frequent gathering site for deaf events. In 1977, ISD celebrated the grand opening of a new elementary school building on campus, reflecting the school's commitment to serving students from the earliest ages. The following decade brought international attention to deaf empowerment with the 1988 Deaf President Now movement at Gallaudet University, which resonated deeply with ISD's students and alumni, reinforcing the value of deaf leadership. A crowning moment came in 1990, when the National Association of the Deaf held its 40th biennial convention in Indianapolis, an event co-hosted by ISD's community and alumni. This gathering drew Deaf leaders from across the country and highlighted Indiana's long legacy in deaf education. At the convention, and in the wake of the Americans with Disabilities Act of 1990, ISD's successes in academic and vocational training were often cited as a model for other states. The early 1990s also saw recognition of ISD's historic campus: in 1991, the entire 42nd Street school complex was listed on the National Register of Historic Places for its architectural and educational significance.

=== New campus ===
In spring 2022, the state of Indiana announced that the Indiana School for the Deaf would move to the campus of the Indiana School for the Blind and Visually Impaired in the 7700 block of North College Avenue in Indianapolis. About $225 million will be spent on new and renovated facilities for the two schools. They will remain separate institutions but will be able to share some resources.

== Academics ==
ISD offers several programs ranging from infants to high school. They are as follows: Parent Infant Program, Preschool, Elementary, Middle School, and High School.

The Parent Infant Program works closely with parents and their deaf or hard of hearing children from ages 0 to 3. When a student reaches 18 months of age, he or she can enroll at ISD as an official student. Preschool handles children up until Pre-Kindergarten. Elementary provides academics and activities for Kindergarten through 4th grade students. Middle school hosts grades 5 to 8, and High School hosts grades 9 through 12.

== Residency ==
ISD is also a residential school for ages 3 to 21. It has dormitories where students reside throughout the week. Students arrive on Sundays and depart on Fridays. Dormitories are for students who live far enough not to be able to travel by bus every day to school. There are dormitories for male and female students: Preschool, Elementary, Middle School, and High School. ISD's residential programs offer extracurricular activities, peer interaction, student growth and development, achievement, and more.

== Athletics ==
ISD offers several athletics starting from 5th grade to 12th grade. The athletic teams are named the Hoosier Orioles. There are sports for both female and male students.

- Male Sports
  - Football
  - Cross Country
  - Wrestling
  - Basketball
  - Baseball
  - Track and Field
  - Swimming
- Female Sports
  - Volleyball
  - Basketball
  - Cheerleading
  - Track and Field
  - Swimming
  - Softball

== See also ==
- Olive Sanxay, poet, taught at ISD in early 1900s
- Sean Berdy, actor, class of 2011
- Phillip A. Emery, alumnus, deaf educator
- List of schools in Indianapolis
- National Register of Historic Places listings in Marion County, Indiana
