= California School for the Deaf, Fremont =

Coordinates: 37°33′32.01″N 121°57′55.33″W

California School for the Deaf

Location
- 39350 Gallaudet Drive; Fremont, California; United States

Information
- Type: Public
- Established: 1860
- Sister school: California School for the Deaf Riverside
- Superintendent: Amy Novotny
- Faculty: 80
- Grades: E-12
- Enrollment: 300
- Colors: Orange and Black
- Slogan: Learn, Experience, Thrive
- Mascot: Eagles
- Website: csdeagles.com

The California School for the Deaf is a school for deaf and hard of hearing children in Fremont, California. The school educates deaf children from all over Northern California. Its campus in Fremont is adjacent to the campus of the California School for the Blind.

Its companion is their sister school in Southern California is CSD-Riverside.

It is part of the California Department of Education's State Special Schools.

== History ==
The first California School for the Deaf was established in 1860 with three students. Originally located in San Francisco, the school relocated to Berkeley in 1869. CSD Fremont was established in 1980.

CSD Fremont serves deaf and hard-of-hearing students from preschool through 12th grade across Northern California. With a focus on American Sign Language (ASL) and bilingual education, the school provides an accessible learning environment tailored to the needs of Deaf culture and community. Over the years, it has become a national model for Deaf education, promoting empowerment, self-advocacy, and academic excellence.

By 2009, 90% of the school's administration and 75% of staff were themselves Deaf or hard-of-hearing.

== Campus life ==
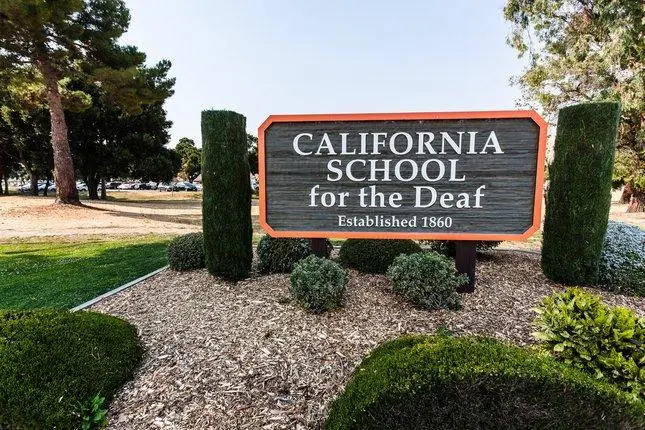
California School for the Deaf Fremont sign upon entering the school

=== Residential life ===
The Independent Living Skills (ILS) program allows for senior students to live in apartments on campus. These apartments are called "cottages", and it is the student's responsibility to maintain the apartment and practice living independently. The ILS department offers trainings to students on topics such as:

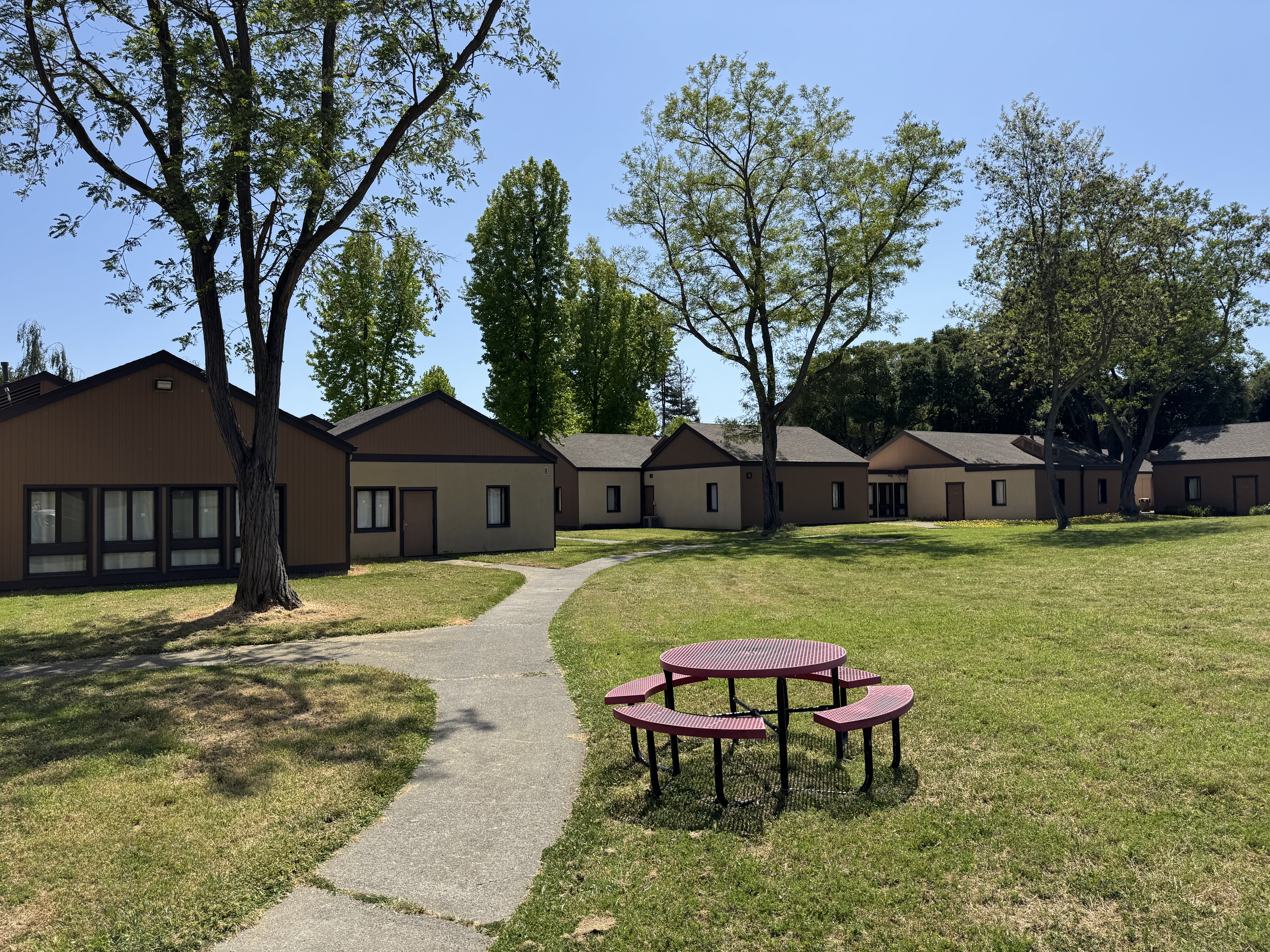
A few cottages within the residential living area on the CSD Fremont campus

1. Mock rental application scenarios
2. Independent access to apartments (providing the student with their own key)
3. Personal relationships/Conflict resolution
4. Kitchen safety & Cooking
5. Apartment maintenance (daily and deep cleaning)
6. Personal Health and hygiene
7. Time Management
8. Special Events

=== Student organizations ===
Student organizations include:

1. Asian Pacific Islander Organization (API) - Promotes networking between API Deaf students, bringing awareness to Asian Deaf Culture.
2. Black Student Union (BSU) - Supports students to embrace their identity by creating a safe space and celebrating culture.
3. Indigenous People's Organization (IP) - Creates a space for Native American Deaf students to come together, strengthening their presence on campus.
4. Raza de Sordx Organization (RDS) - Promotes networking between Latinx Deaf students, bringing awareness to Latinx Deaf Culture.
5. Gender & Sexualities Alliance (GSA) - Activist LGBTQIA+ group that comes together and prioritizes the goal to respect all and create a safe educational environment.
6. Foothills Athletic Association (FAA) - Founded in 1901 to encourage students of the CSD to engage in athletics to promote school spirit and practice good citizenship.
7. Peer Advocate Program (PA) - This student-run program is available to students for guidance and support through presentations and activities.
8. Jr. National Association of the Deaf (Jr. NAD) - This student-run organization is a unit of the student body government. They engage in student leadership roles to navigate needs on a regional and national level.
9. Student Body Government (SBG) - This student organization works to better the school based on student and staff needs.

=== Student Support Services ===
The school offers a variety of support services for students on campus. The student Outreach Services offers families and the community with tours of campus, classes for CSD families, as well as workshops and resources open to the community.

== Academics ==
=== Academic departments ===
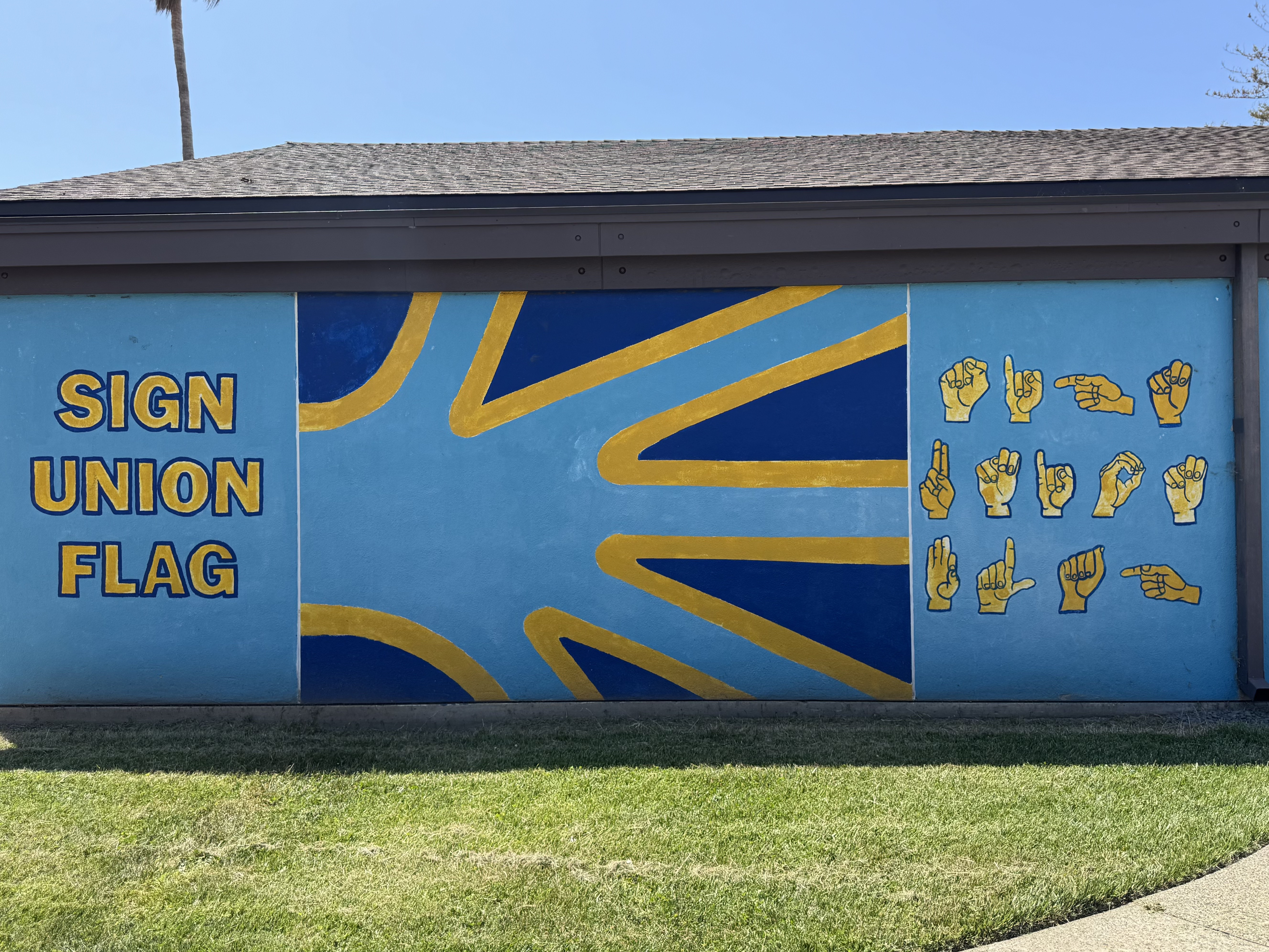
A mural on the CSD Fremont campus of the Sign Union Flag painted in 2017 by Arnaud Balard and others

- Director of Instruction: This department ensure students are learning inside the classroom and outside with clubs, field trips and athletics.
- Career Center: This department provides numerous services to the families and the students to assist with transition from high school to adulthood.
- Career Technical Education: This department provides eight programs of study such as biotechnology, technology pathway, construction pathway, culinary arts, digital media, graphic technology, information technology and lastly wood technology.
- Early Childhood Education: This department provides services to deaf children ranging from infancy to kindergarten.
- Elementary School: This department provides educational services from kindergarten to 5th grade. Following the Common Core State Standards (CCSS) and Next Generation Science Standards (NGSS).
- Middle School: This department provides educational services to students 6th to 8th grade. Following the Common Core standards in course offerings the follow American Sign Language as the language of instruction.
- High School: This department provides educational services from 9th to 12th grade. Core course offerings are: Advanced Placement English, Chemistry, Physics, Algebra I and II, American Sign Language, International Studies, World History, and more. Common Core standards and bilingual education principles are integrated in their instruction.
- Physical Education: This department educates students on healthy living and prepares students for a better chance of passing California Physical Fitness Test (PFT) in fifth, seventh and ninth grades.

=== Academic performance ===
Reports on CSD-Fremont's Academic performance is measured utilizing California Schools Dashboard and evaluates numerous performance indicators. In academic subjects, Language Arts receives an orange rating, suggesting that the students' current performance is 13.2 points below average. In Mathematics the school earned a low orange standing with 47.6 points below standard. Lastly, college and career preparation received a yellow standing with preparation of 45.3%.

Despite the lower score ratings, the school has reported a positive trend in its language arts program and appears to be actively working on addressing its educational gaps for students.

==== Teaching system ====
CSD Fremont prepares its students from preschool through high school through a detailed education play focusing on bilingual development, life skills, and activism. Its academic programs are centered around the needs of deaf and hard-of-hearing students. This school ensure prioritization of sign language and inclusion with teacher Ty Kovacs stating “We have built a culture of community. Being deaf is normal here, and everyone signs". By following state and local developed standards, CSD-Fremont utilizes a bilingual approach, incorporating ASL and English to support the students' academic progression. The curriculum utilizes Curriculum Outcomes Resources Education (CORE) to support 5 main domains of early intervention, community education, parent education, assistance to local education agencies and academic assessment consultation. CSD Fremont's philosophy encourages its students to promote advocacy and the importance of deaf culture while preparing students for successful futures. Currently, the student to faculty ratio is 10:1 while 86% of teachers and cottage staff are deaf.

== Athletics ==
California School for the Deaf, Fremont offers a comprehensive athletic program that is integral to student life, promoting teamwork, leadership, and community involvement. The school competes in the California Interscholastic Federation (CIF) North Coast Section and provides opportunities for students to participate in various sports, including football, volleyball, basketball, track and field, soccer, wrestling, and cheerleading.

=== Sports ===
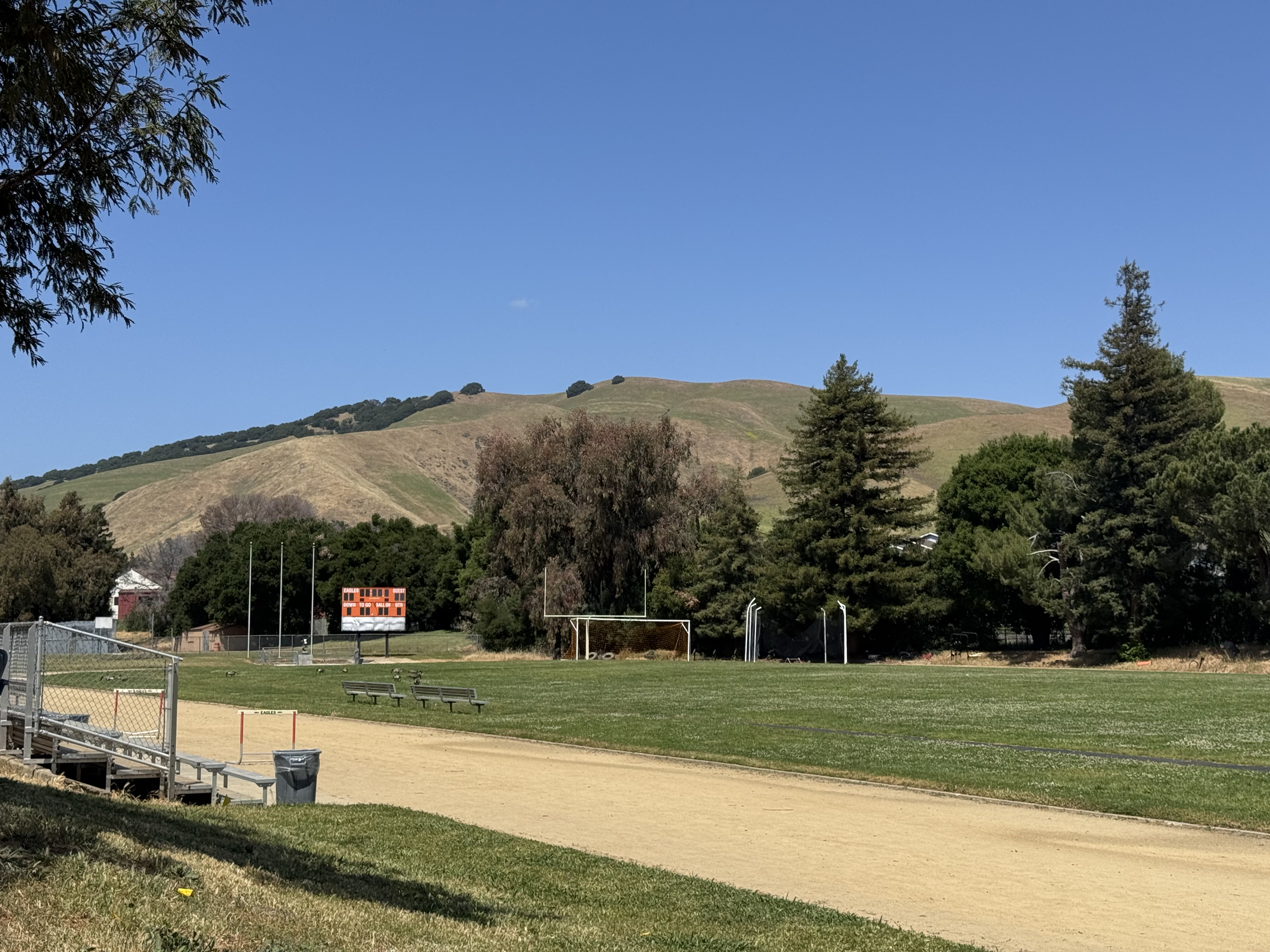
CSD Fremont Football Field

Sports played in are football, volleyball, basketball, track and field, soccer, wrestling, and cheerleading. Each sport is available at both junior varsity and varsity levels, providing students of all skill levels the opportunity to participate.

=== The Big Game ===
One of the most anticipated events each year is "The Big Game", a historic football rivalry between CSD Fremont and California School for the Deaf, Riverside. This annual match is a symbol of athletic and school pride, drawing attention from the deaf community across the state. The game has been played for decades and remains one of the most notable traditions at both schools. The rivalry fosters a sense of community and school spirit, with students, alumni, and supporters participating in the event.

=== Achievements and championships ===
CSD Fremont's athletic teams have achieved success in multiple sports, consistently earning recognition in regional and state competitions. Some of the school's notable athletic achievements include:

- Football: Multiple playoff appearances in the CIF North Coast Section.
- Basketball: Regional champions in several years, with consistent playoff appearances.
- Track and Field: Strong individual and team performances in CIF state championships, with athletes qualifying for regional meets.
- Volleyball: Consistent contenders in league championships.

=== National Champions ===
Below is a table highlighting some of the athletic sports national champion achievements of CSD Fremont over the years.

CSD Fremont National Champions
Football	Cross Country	Baseball	Softball
1940	1987	1993	1990
1963	1988	2001	1995
1966	1989	2002	1998
1985	1990	2007	2001
2002	1991	2008	2003
2012	1992	2010	2009
2014	1994	2012	2013
	1995	2014	
	1996		

=== Athletic facilities ===
- Football Field: A full-sized field for football games and other outdoor activities.
- Gymnasium: A large and small multi-purpose gym for basketball, volleyball, wrestling, and other indoor sports.
- Track and Field Area: A dedicated space for training and events in track and field.
- Wrestling Room: A specialized space for wrestling practice and matches.

These facilities provide student-athletes with the resources they need to succeed and are regularly maintained to meet the needs of the school's athletic programs.

=== Success of deaf sports ===
The California School for the Deaf (CSD) Riverside football team made history by winning its third straight state championship in 2024. They were led by Coach Keith Adams, who uses American Sign Language (ASL) to call plays. Journalist Thomas Fuller, author of The Boys of Riverside, explained how the team's ASL communication and shared Deaf identity fueled their success. Neuroscientist David Corina noted that deaf athletes often have enhanced visual awareness, giving them split-second advantages on the field. Quarterback Caden Adams said: "We rely on our eyes. We see movement ahead of time, so we think two steps ahead."

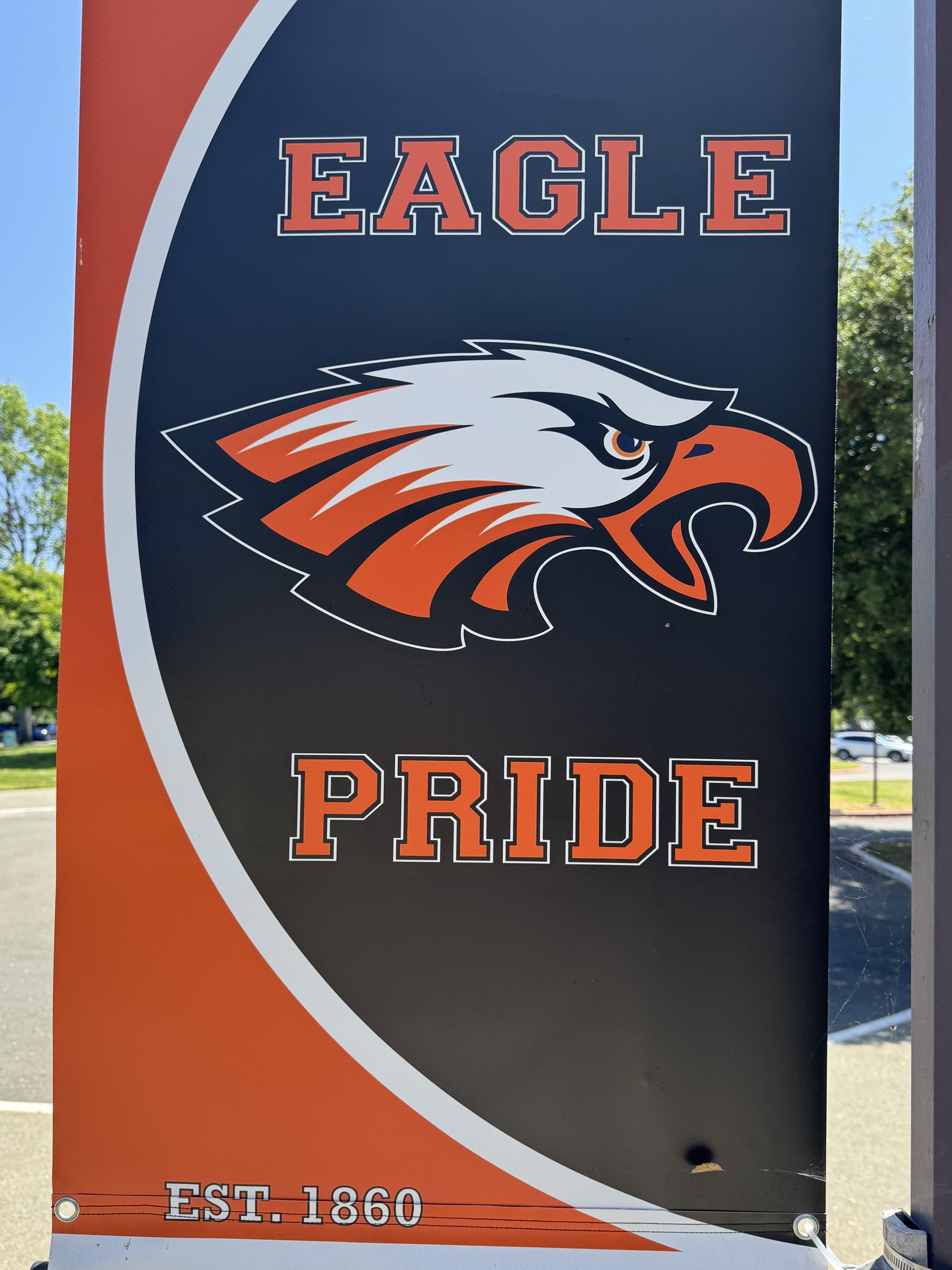
CSD Fremont Eagle Pride Banner

== Notable alumni ==
- Robert R. Davila, ninth president of Gallaudet University
- Jack R. Gannon, teacher, coach, and author
- Granville Redmond, painter
- Louise Stern, writer and artist
- Shoshannah Stern, actress
- Douglas Tilden, sculptor
