= Model Secondary School for the Deaf =

School in Washington, D.C., U.S.

Coordinates: 38°54′27″N 76°59′21.6″W

- 800 Florida Ave NE; Washington, D.C. United States

Information
- Type: University-affiliated laboratory school
- Established: 1969
- NCES School ID: A9700911
- Grades: 9th through 12th
- Enrollment: 175
- Student to teacher ratio: 6:1
- Colors: Red; White; Dark Blue
- Athletics conference: PVAC
- Mascot: Eagle
- Website: mssd.gallaudet.edu

The Model Secondary School (MSSD) is a residential four-year high school for deaf and hard-of-hearing students located on the Gallaudet University campus in Washington, D.C.

== History ==
Prior to 1970, Kendall School for the Deaf served students from preschool to twelfth grade.

The Model Secondary School for the Deaf Act was signed by President Lyndon B. Johnson on October 15, 1966 (P.L. 89-694). In May 1969, the Secretary of the U.S. Department of Health, Education and Welfare and the President of Gallaudet College signed an agreement authorizing the establishment and operation of the Model Secondary School for the Deaf (MSSD) at the College. MSSD is now located on the northeastern end of the Gallaudet University campus.

MSSD provides a tuition-free comprehensive day and residential four-year high school program for deaf and hard of hearing students from the United States and its territories. MSSD is fully accredited by two organizations:

- Middle States Association of Colleges and Schools
- Conference of Educational Administrators of Schools and Programs for the Deaf

MSSD is a demonstration school of the Laurent Clerc National Deaf Education Center. Their Belief and Mission Statements can be viewed at the Clerc Center website.

== Demographics ==
Race/Ethnicity as of 2021-2022
Group	Number of Students	Percentage
Total	101	100%
White	61	60.39%
Asian	9	8.91%
Hispanic	8	7.92%
Two or More Races	2	1.98%
Black	20	19.80%
Native Hawaiian/Pacific Islander	0	0.00%
American Indian/Alaska Native	1	0.99%

== Campus and student body ==
The school is tuition-free and open only to residents of the United States and its territories. The school enrollment ranges from 160 to 180 students. Students are typically between ages 14 and 21. The majority of new students begin in the fall semester, but students are also admitted in the spring. An array of support services is available to all MSSD students, including a new signer program, communication support services, audiological services, counseling services, social work services, psychological services, and health services. MSSD students are expected to graduate ready for the challenges of adult life.

== See also ==
- List of boarding schools in the United States
