= Deafness in the Philippines =

The Filipino Sign Language (FSL) is the official language of education for deaf Filipinos, which number around 1,165,000 as of 2025.

== Language emergence ==
=== First use of signs (1604) ===
The first incidence of sign language emergence was documented in 1604. During this time, a hearing priest used gestures to explain religious practices and the concept of God to two deaf Filipinos. After this incident, the two deaf Filipinos spread their new knowledge to their religious groups. After 1604, there is little history of documented Filipino Sign Language (FSL) until 1907.

=== Influence of American Sign Language (1907) ===
During this time, the United States of America had colonized the Philippines, and the American colonists built the School for the Deaf and Blind in 1907. Miss Delight Rice was invited to teach the Deaf students at the school. She noted having to persuade Filipino parents to let their children be educated. She recalled that the parents were ashamed of their deaf children, and she had to persuade the parents that all children were deserving of an education. While at the School for the Deaf and Blind, deaf students who knew sign language were taught American Sign Language (ASL). They were taught the ASL alphabet, which is identical to the current FSL alphabet. In school, students were also taught Signing Exact English (SEE).

=== Distinction from American Sign Language (present) ===
Both languages utilize the same Latin alphabet system, and most of the letters are fingerspelled the same in ASL and FSL, but there are a few key differences. The letters E, T, and G are signed with slightly different hand shapes in ASL and FSL. While E and G are signed differently for genetic reasons, the letter T is signed differently for cultural reasons. Besides the minor letter discrepancies, FSL and ASL differ in some vocabulary words, some classifier and grammatical features, and some syntactical modification processes. There are also regional variations between cities and islands of the Philippines.

== Major organizations ==
=== Philippine Federation of the Deaf (PFD) ===
The Philippine Federation of the Deaf (PFD) is a non-profit organization whose goals include preserving FSL, encouraging Deaf identities, representing Deaf Filipinos in global settings, and aiding the development of grassroots organizations. They were founded in 1997. They are a member of the World Federation for the Deaf (WFD) and have collaborated with the Philippine Deaf Resource Center (PDRC) to conduct studies on justice equality for Deaf Filipinos. PFD has also collaborated with other empowerment organizations such as Discovering Deaf Worlds (DDW). Their promoted project (USAID Expand Program) on their website trains organizations in management skills, forwarding the member organizations' independence in educating and advocating for their members.

=== Philippine Deaf Resource Center (PDRC) ===
The Philippine Deaf Resource Center (PDRC) was founded in 2001. Their main focus is research in the Filipino Sign Language field and how Deafness affects socio-economic standing. They also provide resources for Deaf people and their families and friends, especially telecommunication technology. In 2009, the PDRC created an online corporus for Philippine languages, which included resources, such as religious texts and artistic prose and poems, for the four most common spoken languages (Tagalog, Cebuano, Ilocano, and Hiligaynon) as well as the most common sign language, FSL. This online corporus of Philippine languages is available online on PALITO; it is unknown whether PALITO is available for the public or only researchers.

=== International Deaf Education Association (IDEA) ===
The International Deaf Education Association (IDEA) focus on vocational and missionary education for Deaf children on the islands of Bohol and Leyte. In 1991, IDEA was established in the Philippines as a non-profit organization. The only options for support from people across the world are donating to the organization, by sponsoring a child, sponsoring a teacher, or donating straight to the Digital Learning Fund or to the organization as a whole.

=== Discovering Deaf Worlds (DDW) ===
Discovering Deaf Worlds (DDW) provides education, encourages advocacy, aims to expand Deaf people's role in society, and building community development skills for Deaf Filipinos. In their past projects, they've focused on finding Deaf Costa Rican advocates to speak out for their Deaf community, giving Indian Deaf Disabled children a chance at new life, and implementing leadership and community building skills in several Indian cities. They also worked with PFD to demand that FSL be declared the national sign language of the Philippines.

== Human and civil rights ==
The Convention on the Rights of Persons with Disabilities (CRPD) was crafted by the United Nations (UN) in 2006 and was effective after 2008. Before the document became effective, the Philippines signed the CRPD in 2007 and ratified it in 2008.

In 2014, the UN released the "List of issues in relation to the initial report of the Philippines." In 2013, the Philippine Coalition on the UN Convention on the Rights of Persons with Disabilities wrote "A Parallel Report submitted to the Committee on the Rights of Persons with Disabilities on the implementation of the Convention in the Republic of the Philippines from 2008-2013. Here is the list of Deaf-related facets from the report in 2013 and 2014:

- high concern about the lack of access to justice for Deaf people, especially the lack of sign language interpreters in judicial settings despite legislation for equity in this setting
- high concern about discriminatory policies that prevent Deaf people from carrying out activities of daily living, such as the requirement of Deaf people who drive to have a hearing person with them at all times
- high concern about the sexual violence against Deaf women and girls; "a total of 346+ cases involving deaf parties from 2006-2012, violence against deaf women account for over 168 cases"
- high concern for a law that claims Deaf people are so "demented" that they cannot legally be witness to the execution of a will
- high concern for the mistreatment of deaf children in schools, such as punishment for signing and coercion into speech therapy
- high concern for the increasing number of deaf children who receive cochlear implants

In 2018, the Committee on the Rights of Persons with Disabilities released the "Concluding observations on the initial report of the Philippines." Here is the list of Deaf-related facets from the report in 2018:

- high concern about the sexual violence against Deaf women and girls; "rape cases filed by women and girls who are deaf or hard of hearing outnumber all other types of complaints by women with disabilities, by a factor of 10 to 1," especially school-aged children
- high concern about the lack of Deaf identity in the Filipino Deaf community
- strong recommendation that disaster relief foundations provide information in sign language
- strong recommendation to increase the number of sign language interpreters in judicial settings

There was also high concern about the lack of a national sign language. This was ameliorated by the passing of legislation RA 11106 in mid-2018, which recognized FSL as the national sign language. This legislation ensured that government transactions are translated into FSL for all, promoted a collaboration for a standard national curriculum in deaf education, encouraged the utilization of Deaf teachers in Deaf education, created a rigorous sign language interpreter training program to ensure adequate interpretation, and enforced the use of FSL in the workplace, judicial settings, hospitals, public transportation settings, and media.

== Early hearing detection and intervention ==
Universal Newborn Hearing Screening (UNHS) is shown to decrease the language delay and language deprivation that is common with deaf and hard-of-hearing (DHH) children. In 2007, the Philippine government started a task force for Newborn Hearing Screening. In 2009, the Philippine government passed the Universal Newborn Hearing Screening and Intervention Act with RA9709. In terms of implementation, otoacoustic emission (OAE) and automated auditory brainstem response (AABR) are the recommended testing methods for newborns in the Philippines.

=== RA9709 ===
The RA9709, titled "Universal Newborn Hearing Screening and Intervention Act of 2009," is the current legislation that has provisions for UNHS in the Philippines (with some modifications in 2020). The policies especially significant to UNHS are listed below:

- Section 2: Declaration of Policy - this section recognizes that DHH children deserve language access from a young age, and the purpose of this policy will be the first step to enforce that
- Section 3: Universal Newborn Hearing Screening Program - this section defines the provisions for hearing screening and follow up for all infants
- Section 5: Obligation to Inform - this section requires all healthcare professionals who are a part of newborn delivery to inform parents about the necessity of hearing screenings
- Section 6: Obligation to Perform Newborn Hearing Loss Screening and Audiologic Diagnostic Evaluation - this section requires all infants to be screened before 3 months old, and that the responsibility for testing falls on the child's parents and healthcare professionals
- Section 7: Refusal to be Tested - this section allows religious or cultural exceptions for hearing screening, but a waiver must be signed
- Section 8: Continuous Education, Re-Education and Training - this section requires government agencies to provide information and training about hearing screening to healthcare professionals
- Section 11: Establishment of Newborn Hearing Screening Center - this section requires the establishment of specific centers for hearing screenings, referrals, and follow-up appointments
- Section 12: Data Management and Applied Research - this section requires periodical submission of screening test data and long-term plans made for each child
- Section 14: Newborn Screening Fees - this section requires that the Philippine Health Insurance Corporation (PHIC) include the cost of newborn hearing screening in its costs

=== Implementation ===
Generally, healthcare workers in the Philippines feel obligated to alert new parents about the hearing screening tests whether they give birth in a hospital, where it's required, or at home, where it's more difficult to implement. However, there are still limitations in some provinces and rural areas for access to proper technologies or information dissemination techniques that could be remedied.

=== Interventions ===
Children have the option to buy hearing aids or cochlear implants. Hearing aids can cost anywhere between 35,000 and 280,000 Philippine pesos, while cochlear implants can cost up to 1,200,000 Philippine pesos. The Philippine Department of Education also offers Special Education (SPED) programs in all public schools for children with disabilities. These programs are overseen by the National Council on Disability Affairs. Deaf children are provided with access to sign language in their education in the SPED programs of mainstream schools. Many SPED teachers utilize a bilingual approach, teaching students American Sign Language.

== Higher education ==
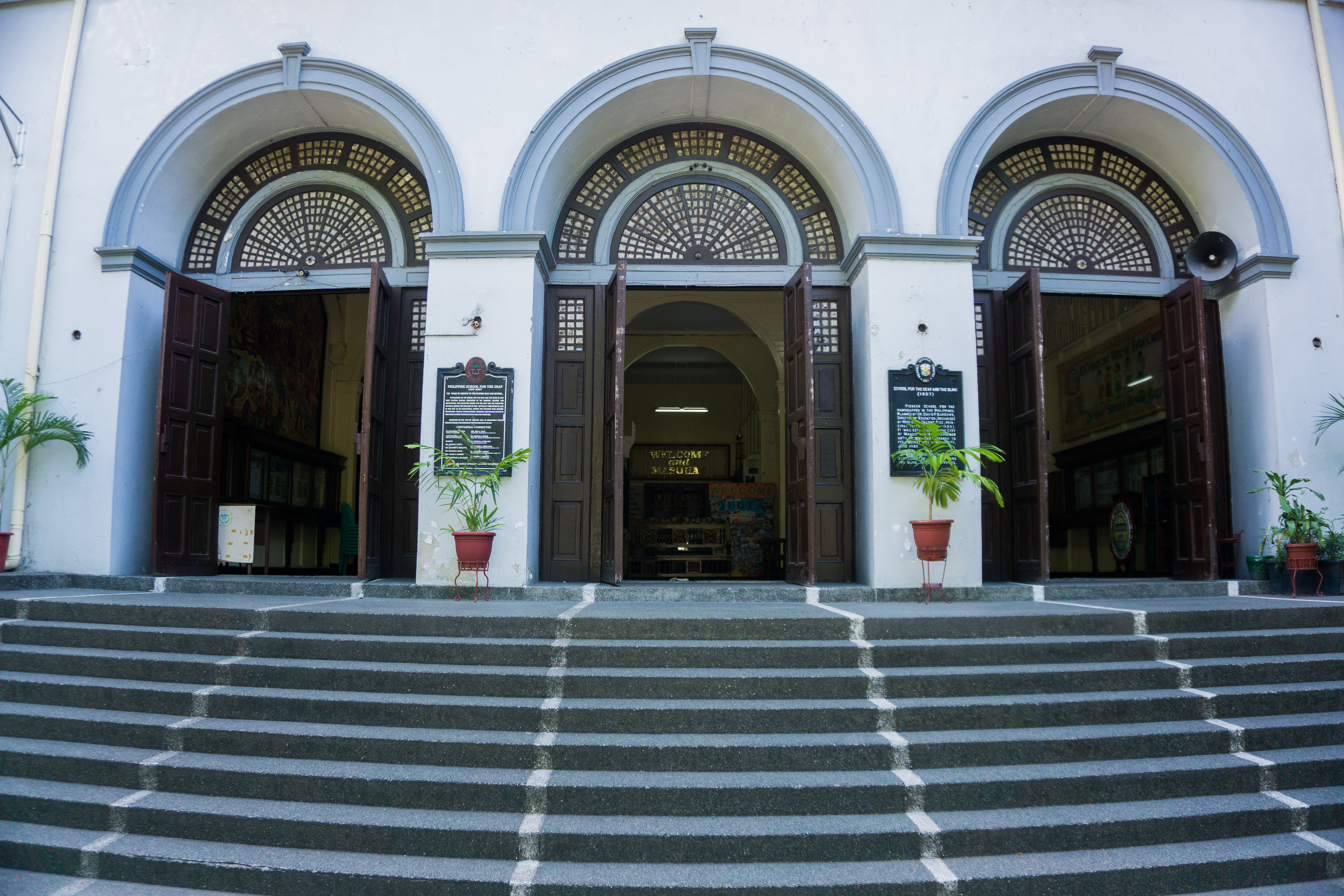
Philippine School for the Deaf Pasay

=== Legal protection ===
The Republic Act No. 7277 promotes adequate education for disabled people in the Philippines. This act declares, among other things:

- Section 5: Equal Opportunity for Employment - people cannot be denied employment on the basis of disability
- Section 6: Sheltered Employment - if disabled people can't find employment, they are ensured to find a stable job in their field of interest through sheltered employment
- Section 8: Incentives for Employers - private companies must provide accommodations for their disabled employees
- Section 9: Vocational Rehabilitation - the Philippine government will provide vocational training to disabled people for skill development
- Section 10: Vocational Guidance and Counseling - disabled people will be supplied resources and counselors for vocational training
- Section 12: Access to Quality Education - the Philippine government will provide equal access to quality education, and it is unlawful to deny a student admission to school on a basis of disability
- Section 13: Assistance to Disabled Students - the Philippines government must supply finance assistance to disabled students pursuing postsecondary school
- Section 14: Special Education - public schools must supply adequate special education (SPED) programs, funded by the Philippine government
- Section 17: State Universities and Colleges - colleges are responsible for providing required assistance, vocational training materials, and research on elimination of discrimination of disabled people
- Section 26: Access to Public Transport Facilities - the Philippine government will develop and fund a program to help disabled people access public transportation

=== Deaf postsecondary schools ===
Deaf postsecondary schools in the Philippines
	CAP College School for the Deaf	DLS-College of St. Benilde	Cebu State College of Science and Technology	MCCID College of Technology
Location(s)	Manila, Luzon	Manila, Luzon Antipolo, Rizal	Cebu City, Cebu (main)	San Mateo, Rizal
Founded in (year)	1989	1988	1911	1993
Funded	by the Philippine government	by the Philippine Government	privately	privately

==== CAP College School for the Deaf ====
Starting off as the CAP College Foundation, the CAP College School for the Deaf prioritizes developing employment skills, advocating for the Deaf community, self-reliance and independence, and improving the socio-economic status of Deaf people.

They offer degrees in:

- Associate's in Artis in Information Technology, and
- Bachelor of Science in Business Administration

==== De La Salle (DLS)-College of St. Benilde ====
The DLS-College of St. Benilde prioritizes catholic heritage, societal service, and accessibility to education.

They offer multiple undergraduate programs, including:

- School of Arts, Culture, and Performance
- School of Deaf Education and Applied Studies
- School of Diplomacy and Governance
- School of Environment and Design
- School of Hotel, Restaurant and Institution Management
- School of Management and Information Technology, and
- School of New Media Arts

==== Cebu Technical University ====
Previously known as Cebu State College of Science and Technology, Cebu Technological University has nine satellite campuses in Argao, Babag, Barili, Carmen, Daanbantayan, Danao City, San Francisco, Maolboal, and Tuburan. There are also thirteen extension campuses in Balamban, Bantayan, Dumanjug, Ginatilan, Malabuyoc, Naga, Oslob, Pinamungahan, Samboan, San Fernando, San Remigio, Tabogon, and Tabuelan.

Their main campus in Cebu City has multiple undergraduate programs, including:

- College of Arts and Sciences
- College of Computer, Information and Communications Technology
- College of Management and Entrepreneurship
- College of Engineering
- College of Education, and
- College of Technology

==== Manila Christian Computer Institute for the Deaf (MCCID) College of Technology ====
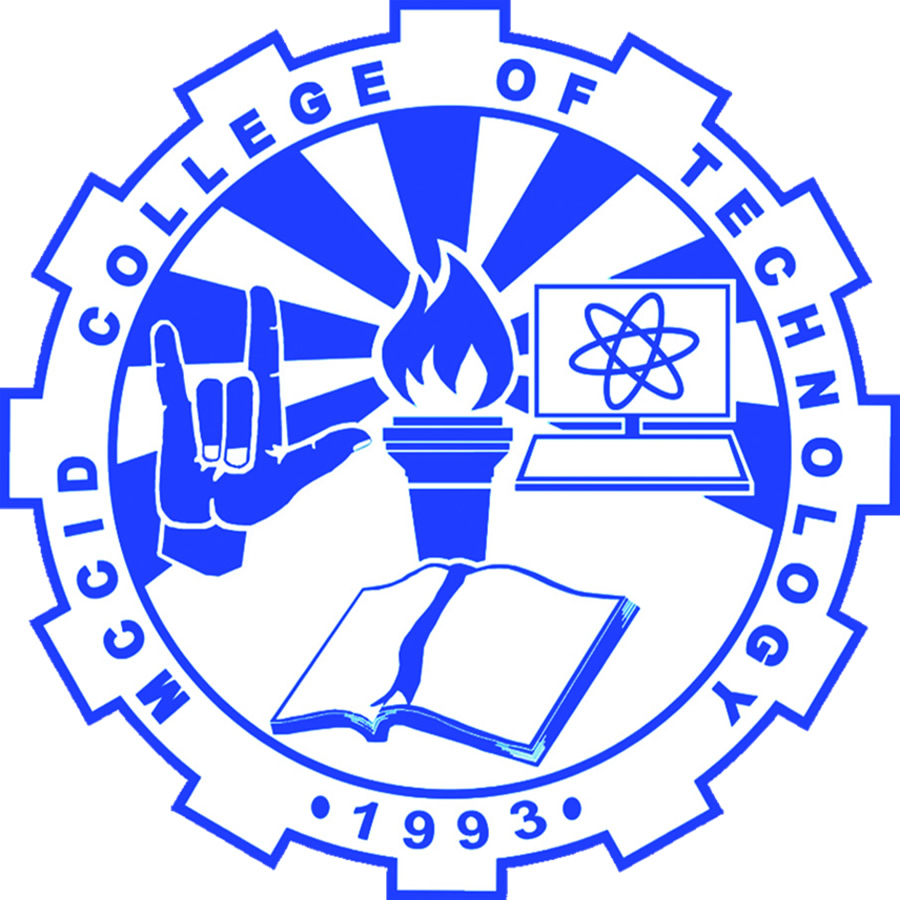
The MCCID logo, which symbolizes their three pillars: sign language education, Christian values, and technological studies.

Manila Christian Computer Institute for the Deaf College of Technology prioritizes computer technical training, sign languages, Christian values, recreational activities, and job assistance.

They offer classes in-person and online in the following programs:

- Diploma in Arts and Computer Design Technology for the Deaf (DACDT)
- Diploma in Business Technology for the Deaf (DBT)
- One-Year Certificate in Sign Language and Interpreting Course (CSLI)
- Five-Month Computer Software Operation Technology Course (CSOT)
- Free Deaf Sensitivity Training
- Online Sign Language Live Tutorials
- Online Advanced Sign Language Live Tutorials,
- Online Filipino Sign Language Live Tutorials, and
- Online Advanced Filipino Sign Language Live Tutorials

== Healthcare ==
=== Legal protection ===
The Republic Act No. 7277 enacts the following health policies:

- Section 18: National Health Program - the goals of this program are to prevent disability, diagnose disability early, and provide early rehabilitation for disabled people
- Section 20: Health Services - the Philippine government recognizes the right to health of disabled people and will provide funds to make disability prevention and medical treatment affordable
- Section 26: Access to Public Transport Facilities - the Philippine government will develop and fund a program to help disabled people access public transportation

=== Health disparities ===
Deaf Filipinos are more likely to experience sexual assault than any other types of disparity. There has also been a call for more accurate research to decrease the number of sexual assaults. Deaf Filipinos are also less likely to be able to report any type of assault, because the National Bureau of Investigation (NBI) considers interpreters a third party, which is classified as hearsay.

Filipinos of all age groups are also more likely to be affected by deafness than higher income countries. Filipinos were also found to have higher incidence of more profound deafness.

The Philippines is known as one of the most disaster-prone nations in the globe, experiencing 8-9 tropical cyclones throughout the summer Deaf Filipinos are also more likely to die in disaster situations than their hearing counterparts. They are unable to speak with emergency medical services provided in the country, and there does not seem to be an emergency medical service specifically for Deaf Filipinos.

== Employment ==
=== Legal protection ===
The Republic Act No. 7277, passed in 1992, enacts the following employment and vocational policies in place:

- Section 5: Equal Opportunity for Employment - people cannot be denied employment on the basis of disability
- Section 6: Sheltered Employment - if disabled people can't find employment, they are ensured to find a stable job in their field of interest through sheltered employment
- Section 8: Incentives for Employers - private companies must provide accommodations for their disabled employees
- Section 9: Vocational Rehabilitation - the Philippine government will provide vocational training to disabled people for skill development
- Section 10: Vocational Guidance and Counseling - disabled people will be supplied resources and counselors for vocational training
- Section 26: Access to Public Transport Facilities - the Philippine government will develop and fund a program to help disabled people access public transportation
- Section 32: Discrimination on Employment - it is forbidden to deny a person employment based on disability, and corporations must provide accessible opportunities to apply and work as abled people

=== Income ===
While the RA 7277 protects against discrimination and encourages equal opportunity of Deaf people, the estimated daily income of Deaf Filipinos was around P35.00 and P60.00. In comparison, the estimated daily income of hearing Filipinos at the same time was around P290.73.

=== Common jobs ===
Most Deaf Filipinos have blue-collar jobs like garbage scavengers, vendors, sewers (dressmakers), manicurists, masseuses, farmers, jeep barkers, pedicab drivers, carpenters, electricians, or umbrella repairers. Likewise, the National Vocational Rehabilitation Center provides free training for Deaf people in classes like hairdressing, cosmetology, massage, sewing, food processing, computer literacy, and electronics. In order to get high-level white-collar jobs, Filipinos must pass a Civil Service Examination. This exam is written in Filipino, while Deaf education primarily consists of FSL and English.

== Language preservation and revitalization ==
Filipino Sign Language has a mid-sized population, with about 121,000 Deaf native speakers. It is also considered to be a stable language, because FSL is not the primary language used in most educational institutions or workplaces. However, it is used as the primary language in Deaf schools and programs, supplemented by written English. FSL ranks between a 5-6a on the Expanded Graded Intergenerational Disruption Scale (EGIDS) scale.

There are many factors that contribute to the preservation of a language, including documentation, instruction to children and adults, cultural awareness, and national recognition. Here are the Philippines' resources for each factor:

- Documentation: There are many websites and resources online to learn Filipino Sign Language vocabulary. There are also prospects of a Filipino Sign Language Dictionary in the works.
- Instruction: Children in Deaf institutions are taught primarily ASL, FSL, and written English.
- Cultural awareness: The Deaf community in the Philippines feel a strong identity towards being Deaf, associating with other Deaf individuals, attending Deaf schools, participating in Deaf programs, and using sign language (particularly Filipino Sign Language).
- National recognition: The Republic Act No. 11106 recognizes Filipino Sign Language as the national sign language of the Philippines, which ensured that government transactions are translated into FSL for all, promoted a collaboration for a standard national curriculum in deaf education, encouraged the utilization of Deaf teachers in Deaf education, created a rigorous sign language interpreter training program to ensure adequate interpretation, and enforced the use of FSL in the workplace, judicial settings, hospitals, public transportation settings, and media.
