= NCDA =

The abbreviation NCDA may refer to:

- National Career Development Association
- Northstar Corridor Development Authority
- National Council on Disability Affairs (Philippines)
- NOID Check Digit Algorithm
