= Lisa Brankin =

Managing director of Ford of Britain

Lisa Brankin is managing director of Ford of Britain and has been a Ford employee since 1990 when she joined the company as a graduate trainee. She has held sixteen different positions inside the company.

She grew up in Lisburn Co. Antrim and studied at Ulster University when it was based at the Jordanstown campus. She was conferred with an honorary degree by her alma mater in 2023.

Branklin was promoted to managing director in 2020 and was appointed Ford UK and Ireland chair in 2023. Prior to this promotion, she was the UK marketing director and was suggesting an autonomous Ford with lidar would hit the streets in 2021.
