= William Henry Holmes Lyons =

Irish Unionist politician (1843 – 1924)

William Henry Holmes Lyons PC (Ire) JP DL (31 July 1843 – 27 March 1924) was the High Sheriff of Antrim in 1904. He was a political leader who fought to maintain the union between Great Britain and Northern Ireland. He was known as the "Grand Old Man of Orangeism".

== Early life and education ==
His parents were William Thomas Bristow Lyons JP DL, High Sheriff of Antrim, and Julia Maria, daughter of James Jones of Mount Edward, High Sheriff of Sligo. The family seat was first in Old Park in Belfast and later in Brookhill in Lisburn.

He was born in Belfast and educated at Harrow School and in France. He intended to pursue a military career and passed his examinations with distinction, but owing to defective eyesight (he lost an eye playing rackets at Harrow) he was unable to enter the Army. Lyons became a prominent Unionist.

== Career ==
He was a member of the first Ulster Unionist Council.

He was a member of the Orange Institution and in December 1915, he was promoted to the position of Sovereign Grand Master of the Orange Lodge of Ireland. For fifty years he was a prominent member of the Black Institution. He was also Grand Master of the Imperial Grand Black Chapter of the British Commonwealth. He was also a Freemason.

Mr Lyons was appointed a Privy Councillor in Ireland in 1922.

Mr Lyons married in 1888 a daughter of Geoffrey Evans of Gortmerron House in County Tyrone. He had three daughters and a son who died on 1 November 1918 from influenza contracted in World War I.

He was blind for the last thirty years of his life, and served as the secretary and governor of the Ulster Institution for the Deaf, Dumb and Blind.

== Death ==
According to the Belfast News, a memorial service took place at St Anne’s Cathedral, Belfast on 27 March 1924. His death was reported around the British Empire.

Non-profit organization positions
Preceded by Hunt Walsh Chambre	Sovereign Grand Master of the Royal Black Preceptory; 1914–1924	Succeeded by Sir William Allen
