= Philippine Federation of the Deaf =

Non-profit organization

- Abbreviation: PFD
- Predecessor: Philippine Association of the Deaf (1926–1990)
- Formation: October 19, 1996; 30 years ago
- Purpose: Deaf people representation and empowerment
- Headquarters: Quezon City, Philippines
- President: Mariah Agbay
- Executive secretary: Jesdelton Romo
- Website: pfdeaf.org

The Philippine Federation of the Deaf, Inc. (PFD) is a non-stock, non-profit organization which caters to the general needs of deaf people in the Philippines.

PFD is a national member of the World Federation of the Deaf.

== History ==
The PFD was founded on October 19, 1996, in a meeting held at the Philippine School for the Deaf where 17 leaders of different Deaf organizations nationwide participated. It was formally established during its 1st General Assembly held at the Ateneo de Manila University, Quezon City on May 19, 1997. Members of the assembly, composed of 100 Deaf leaders and Deaf representatives from 15 regions of the country elected its eleven Executive Board composed of Deaf persons for a term of two years from 1997 to 1999.

The PFD registered with the Philippines Securities and Exchange Commission (SEC) on June 26, 1997.

The organization promotes the empowerment of deaf people as well as providing representation of deaf groups in national and international meetings, forums and legislative bodies. PFD likewise aims to provide training to its grass-roots self-help Deaf member-organizations specifically on organizational management, community organization, advocacy techniques, leadership training, values formation and other skills necessary for their development.

PFD's activities include close monitoring with both government and non-government agencies on their efforts to enforce basic rights for the deaf and equalization of opportunities especially on employment to ensure that they are given just and equitable treatment.

Since its inception, PFD has 24 recognized deaf member-organizations within Metro Manila and provinces and expects to increase in number once the requirements for membership have been complied with by other Deaf groups requesting to affiliate with PFD.

On June 1, 2024, the coalitions of Philippine Federation of the Deaf and Alliance of Concerned Teachers staged a protest-rally at Liwasang Bonifacio against the Commission on the Filipino Language-Arthur P. Casanova, for the cultural retention of Filipino Sign Language (Republic Act 11106). The members said the FSL Unit of the CFL abolition will effectively layoff the deaf personnel, “thus, depriving Deaf Filipinos of their language rights and violating the mandate of RA 7104.”

== Objectives ==
The PFD aims to serve all members of the deaf community. The organization's main goals are the following:

- Equal opportunities in employment and access to quality education as vocational rehabilitation services, to telecommunication systems and mass media from the government and the private sectors, on social services and in the public/mass transport system;
- Filipino Sign Language (FSL) as the preferred language of the Filipino deaf people and support its research and development programs/project;
- Public awareness of the deaf in Philippine society and support efforts towards its propagation;
- Support the training of qualified interpreters for deaf people.

== Activities ==
Philippine Federation for the Deaf has already made:

- Representation of the Deaf in national and international meetings/fora;
- Nomination of Deaf individuals for annual local and international scholarships and training;
- Advocacy campaigns with national government agencies, committees and legislative bodies;
- Training on organizational management, community organization, advocacy techniques, leadership training, values formation and other skills necessary for their development;
- Monitoring of implementation of government policy specially on employment;

PFD is also responsible for organizing the following:

- National Congress of the Deaf (biennial)
- PFD General Assembly
- International Deaf Awareness Week (IDAW) (triennial)
- Deaf Education Weekend Seminar
- Sports Development Seminars for the Deaf

== Organized events ==
During its existence, PFD has organized the following events.

- Deaf Gender Awareness and Sensitivity Training Workshops
- Deaf Women and Gender Awareness and Sensitivity Conference
- Leadership training workshops for Deaf Organizations
- Sign Language training workshops
- Deaf Comedy Show

== Representation in the government ==
The PFD has representation in the following government bodies.

- National Anti-Poverty Commission (NAPC)
- National Council on Disability Affairs (NCDA)
- National Youth Commission (NYC)

== Current projects ==
Among PFD's ongoing projects are:

1. Preparation of the "Status Report on the Use of Sign Language" through the National Sign Language Committee (NSLC)
2. Documentation of Filipino Sign Language
3. Production of practical dictionaries and materials for Filipino Sign Language (parallel partnership with Hong Kong, Vietnam and Cambodia)

=== Filipino Sign Language Book Project ===
This is the front cover page of the book Filipino Sign Language Part 1.

The National Sign Language Committee (NSLC) began collecting sign language data from the three main islands in the Philippines (Luzon, Visayas and Mindanao) in 2001. The NSLC through the publication of the "Status Report on the use of Sign Language in the Philippines" by 2004 shall provide baseline data on the use of sign in education, interpreting, sign instruction and media. The NSLC has been challenged by limitations in funding and other resources. When Dr James Woodward has made a proposal on the development of Asian-Pacific indigenous sign language dictionaries, this gave the Filipino Deaf community an opportunity to fulfill the plan of publishing an authentic FSL dictionary.

Dir Gladys Tang from Chinese University of Hong Kong (CUHK) oversees project management the project involving the four countries, and is also local project director for Hong Kong. Dr James Woodward is regional manager and also he is local project director for Vietnam. Fr. Charles Dittemeier is the local project director for Cambodia. The Philippine Federation of the Deaf is responsible for implementation of the project output in Philippines. Marites Raquel Estiller-Corpuz is the only Deaf local project director out of these four countries.

The Project is funded for three years to develop dictionaries and teaching materials as well as a database of sign language data. Six Deaf coordinators are already being trained in sign language analysis, fieldwork and dictionary production. These six Deaf coordinators will be collecting data from regions.

== See also ==
- Deafness in the Philippines
- International Deaf Education Association
