= Filipino Sign Language =

Sign language used in the Philippines

- Native to: Philippines
- Native speakers: 121,000 (2008) to est. 325,000–650,000 (2021)
- Language family: French Sign: American Sign?; Filipino Sign Language

Language codes
- ISO 639-3: psp
- Glottolog: phil1239

Filipino Sign Language, abbreviated as FSL (Filipino: Wikang Senyas ng mga Pilipino), or Philippine Sign Language, is a sign language originating in the Philippines. Like other sign languages, FSL is a unique language with its own grammar, syntax and morphology; it is not based on and does not resemble Filipino or English. Some researchers consider the indigenous signs of FSL to be at risk of being lost due to the increasing influence of American Sign Language.

The Republic Act 11106 or The Filipino Sign Language Act, effective November 27, 2018, declared FSL as the national sign language of the Filipino Deaf.

== ASL influence ==
FSL is believed to be part of the French Sign Language family. It has been strongly influenced by American Sign Language since the establishment in 1907 of the School for the Deaf and Blind (SDB) (now the Philippine School for the Deaf) by Delia Delight Rice (1883–1964), an American Thomasite teacher born to deaf parents. The school was run and managed by American principals until the 1940s. In the 1960s, contact with American Sign Language continued through the launching of the Deaf Evangelistic Alliance Foundation and the Laguna Christian College for the Deaf. Another source of ASL influence was the assignment of volunteers from the United States Peace Corps, who were stationed at various places in the Philippines from 1974 through 1989, as well as religious organizations that promoted ASL and Manually Coded English. Starting in 1982, the International Deaf Education Association (IDEA), led by former Peace Corps volunteer G. Dennis Drake, established a series of residential elementary programs in Bohol using Philippine Sign Language as the primary language of instruction. The Bohol Deaf Academy also primarily emphasizes Philippine Sign Language.

According to sign language researcher Dr. Lisa Martinez, FSL and ASL deviate across three important metrics: different overall form (especially a differing handshape inventory), different methods of sign formation, and different grammar. A noted difference is the letter "T" which is signed differently in FSL than in ASL.

== Regional varieties ==
Through lexicostatistical analysis, there are several identifiable varieties of FSL. The Leyte variety comes from the Eastern Visayas group, while the Southern Luzon group encompasses varieties of Southern Tagalog, Bicol, and Palawan.

There is also at least one sign language that is indigenous to the Philippines. In San Julian, as of 2016, there are twenty Deaf people who use Samar Sign Language. This village sign language is unrelated to mainstream FSL.

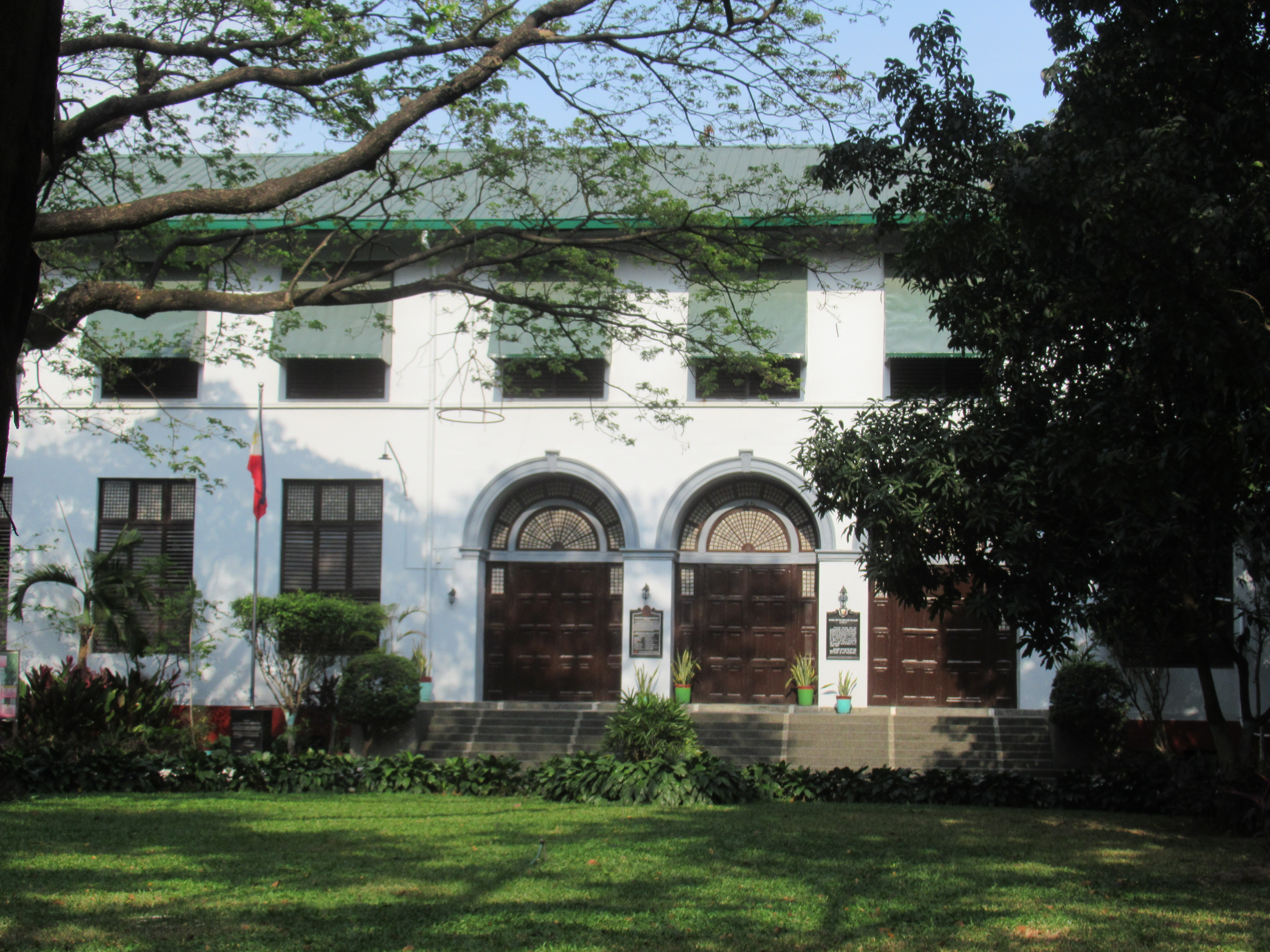
Philippine School for the Deaf

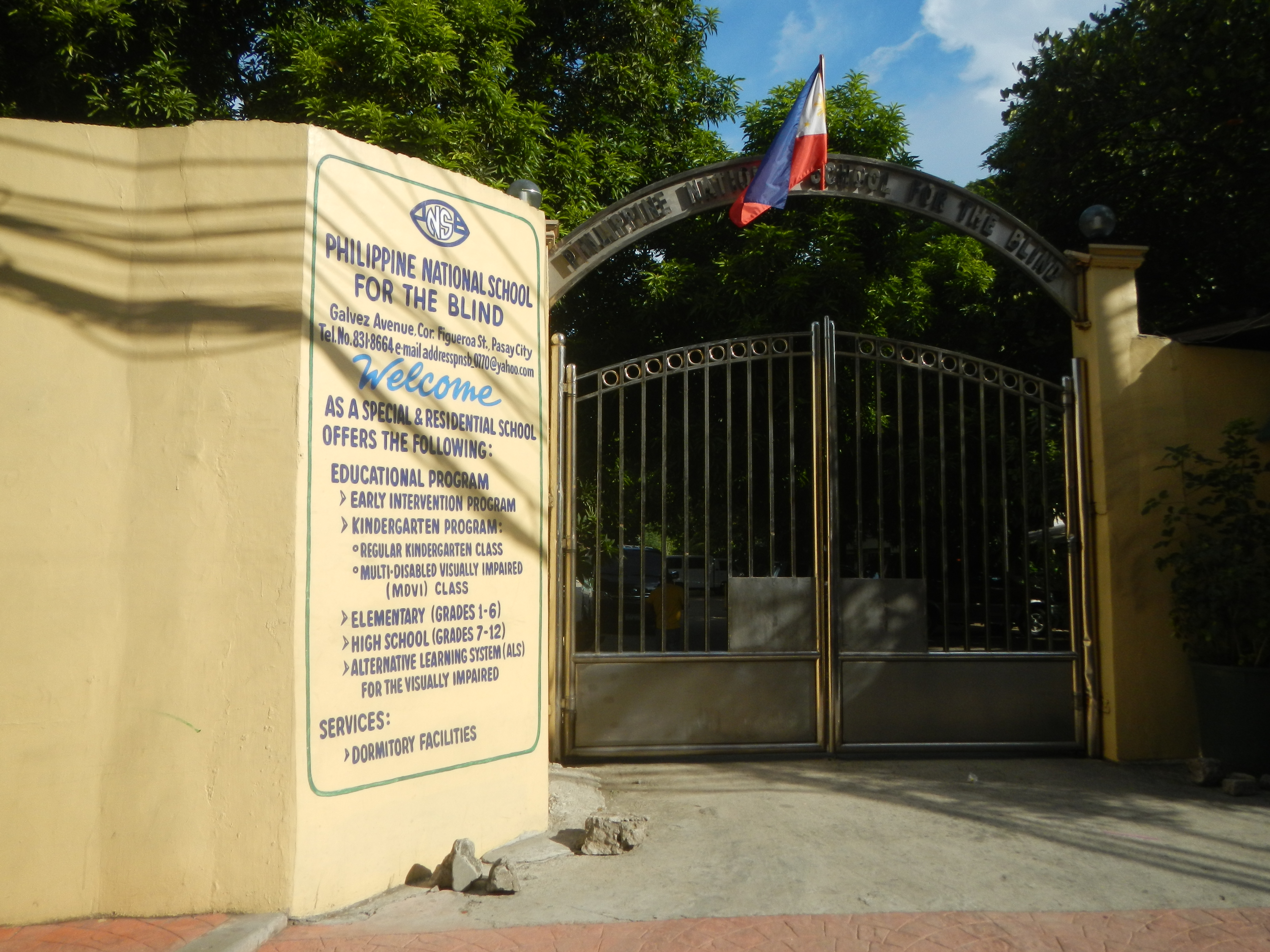
Philippine National School for the Blind

== Status ==
Usage of Filipino Sign Language was reported in 2009 as being used by 54% of sign-language users in the Philippines. In 2011, the Department of Education declared Signing Exact English the language of deaf education in the Philippines. In 2011, Department of Education officials announced in a forum that hearing-impaired children were being taught and would continue to be taught using Signing Exact English (SEE) instead of Filipino Sign Language (FSL). In 2012, House Bill No. 450 was introduced in the Philippine House of Representatives by Rep. Antonio Tinio (Party-list, ACT Teachers) to declare FSL as the National Sign Language of the Philippines and to mandate its use as the medium of official communication in all transactions involving the deaf and the language of instruction of deaf education. As of May 2014, that bill was pending with the Committee on Social Services.

In November 2025, the Philippine National Council on Disability Affairs (NCDA) and overseas Philippine missions, including the Philippine Consulate General in Hong Kong, joined national celebrations of Deaf Awareness Week from 10 to 16 November. Proclaimed annually under Presidential Proclamation No. 829, the observance aims to raise public awareness about deafness, promote understanding of sign languages, and encourage inclusivity for the Deaf and hard‑of‑hearing community. The 2025 theme, “Beyond Silence,” emphasized the importance of challenging misconceptions about deafness and supporting the learning and use of Filipino Sign Language (FSL).

=== Filipino Sign Language Act ===
Republic Act No. 11106 signed by President Rodrigo Duterte on October 30, 2018

In September 2018, Senate Bill No. 1455, sponsored by Senators Nancy Binay, Sherwin Gatchalian, Chiz Escudero, Bam Aquino, Loren Legarda, Joel Villanueva, Cynthia Villar, and Migz Zubiri, passed on third and final reading.

On October 30, 2018, Republic Act 11106 or The Filipino Sign Language Act was signed into law by President Rodrigo Duterte declaring the Filipino Sign Language as the national sign language of the Filipino Deaf. The law also declares the country's national sign language as the official sign language of the government in all transactions involving the deaf.

The law, which seeks to eliminate all forms of discrimination against the Filipino Deaf, also mandates the use of the Filipino Sign Language in schools, broadcast media (instructing the Kapisanan ng mga Brodkaster ng Pilipinas [KBP] and Movie and Television Review and Classification Board [MTRCB] to adopt guidance for requiring that sign language interpretation be offered during all news and public affairs programmes), and workplaces. It also mandates the Komisyon sa Wikang Filipino, in consultation with the stakeholders, to establish a national system of standards and procedures for the interpretation of the Filipino Sign Language. The University of the Philippines System and other education agencies are tasked to develop guidelines for the development of training materials in the education of the Deaf. The law also require the availability of qualified sign language interpreters in all hearings, proceedings, and government transactions involving the Deaf.

"The FSL shall be recognized, promoted and supported as the medium of official communication in all transactions involving the deaf, and as the language of instruction of deaf education, without prejudice to the use of other forms of communications depending on individual choice or preference," the law states. The Department of Education (DepEd), Commission on Higher Education (CHEd), Technical Education and Skills Development Authority (Tesda), and all other national and local government agencies involved in the education of the deaf, are tasked to use and coordinate with each other on the use of FSL as the medium of instruction in deaf education.

The law became effective on November 27, 2018 while its implementing rules and regulations was approved in 2021.

=== Legal issue ===
On June 1, 2024, the coalitions of Philippine Federation of the Deaf and Alliance of Concerned Teachers (ACT) protested at Liwasang Bonifacio against the Commission on the Filipino Language's (CFL) plan to abolish its Filipino Sign Language (FSL) Unit. According to ACT, the CFL, led by its chairman Arthur P. Casanova, decided to abolish the unit after some of the unit's members requested the release of their salaries. The members said the abolition will effectively layoff the deaf personnel, "thus, depriving Deaf Filipinos of their language rights and violating the mandate of RA 7104".

== See also ==
- Deafness in the Philippines
- The Thomasites
- International Deaf Children's Society

== Bibliography ==
Video

- Mi Ultimo Adios in Filipino Sign Language
- Philippine National Anthem in Filipino Sign Language
- Silent Odyssey: A Journey into the Deaf World
- Filipino Sign Language GMANews TV Documentary

Text

- An Introduction to Filipino Sign Language (PDRC/PFD, 2004)
- Filipino Sign Language: A Compilation of Signs from Regions of the Philippines (PFD, 2005)
- Status Report on the Use of Sign Language in the Philippines (NSLC)
- Filipino Sign Language (PEN International, DLS-College of St. Benilde) downloadable PDF
- Republic Act 11106 downloadable PDF
