= CAP College Foundation =

Private college in Makati, Philippines

CAP College Foundation, Inc.
- Type: Private distance learning college
- Established: 1980
- Dean: Angel Alcala
- Location: Makati, Philippines; 14°33′20.1996″N 121°0′53.46″E
- Website: elearning.capcollege.com.ph
- Location in Metro Manila Location in Luzon Location in the Philippines

CAP College Foundation, Inc., formerly named Correspondence Accreditation Program for College Foundation, Inc., is a private, non-sectarian distance learning college in the Philippines.

== History ==
CAP College Foundation, Inc. – a recognized pioneer in educational innovations in the Philippines – was established in 1980 as a non-stock, non-sectarian educational foundation. Instituted under Philippine laws, CAP College engages in education, research and related activities utilizing the non-traditional or non-formal as well as formal delivery system of instruction and grants degrees for programs recognized by the Commission on Higher Education (CHED).

CAP College is patterned after the "open university" concept of education which is already well-established and widely accepted in Europe, North America, Australia, and Asia. With its non-traditional delivery of instruction, CAP College brings learning alternatives, opportunities to Filipinos both here and abroad.

In order to make its programs attuned to the times and with the needs of its students, CAP College continues to expand its network and to develop its linkages with other educational institutions and organizations. It has also developed linkages with government and non-government organizations here and abroad. International linkages include the International Council for Open and Distance Education (ICDE), where CAP College is an institutional member, and the Asian Association of Open Universities (AAOU). Locally, it is affiliated with the Open and Distance Learning Foundation (ODLF) and the Association of Foundations (AF).

In 2007, CAP College embarked on the digitalization of Distance Education. Through www.capcow.com, CAP College harnessed the power of the Internet in serving its students worldwide through: on-line registration, downloading of instructional materials, on-line tutorials, individualized folders for students, and link to a career site via www.jobsdb.com.

Aside from the regular Distance Education Program, CAP College also operates the CAP College for the Deaf (CAP CFD).

== Academics ==
CHED-RECOGNIZED LADDERIZED PROGRAMS

In order to provide the students the necessary platforms that will open pathways of opportunities for career and educational progression, the College sought, and was granted by the Commission on Higher Education, recognition of its Ladderized Programs.

Under this program, a Certificate in Associate in Arts shall be awarded to the student after his completion of four (4) terms. Should circumstances prevent him from finishing his bachelor's degree, he will not be left empty-handed since he has earned already his Associate certificate – a tool he can use when seeking better job opportunities.

The Diploma in Bachelor of Arts or Bachelor of Science shall be awarded to him after his completion of all the terms required by the program – 6 terms for AB Programs or 7 terms for BSBA Programs.

CHED-TESDA INTERFACE

In addition to the CHED-recognized Ladderized Programs, CAP College was granted recognition by the Technical Education and Skills Development Authority (TESDA) as a pioneering institution in the implementation of the Ladderized Education System under Executive Order No. 358 entitled "To Institutionalize a Ladderized Interface Between Technical-Vocational Education & Training (TVET) and Higher Education (HE)". Under this Executive Order, CAP College has been granted recognition to offer AB Information Technology.

With Executive Order No. 358, Higher Education Institutions can now be innovative as they offer programs that answer the needs of the industry. They may now embed Tech-Voc programs in their degree programs and TESDA shall award their students National Certificate (NC) of Skills Competency in addition to the baccalaureate degree that the students will receive after completion of the requirements of the program.

For AB Information Technology, the student qualifies for the following National Certifications:

- NC II in Computer Hardware Servicing after completing 2 terms and 84-Hr. Computer Preventive Maintenance Course; and
- NC IV in Programming after completing 6 terms.

His Certificate in Associate in Arts in Information Technology is awarded to him after completing 4 terms and his Diploma in AB Information Technology is awarded to him after completing the 6th term.

== Instruction ==
Daily classroom attendance is not required at CAP College. The student learns independently and paces himself to be able to meet the requirements of the course by the end of his academic term. However, the student is expected to complete at least one subject every month.

The student's basic texts are printed modules which he shall receive upon enrollment. A subject consists of an average of five modules and each module contains two or more lessons. Also included in the modules are study guides, list of suggested readings, Self-Progress Check Tests and Module Tests. Audio-video CD-ROMs, educational software and the Internet are being made available to supplement the teaching-learning process. One-Week Reviewers and Final Examination Reviewers on selected subjects are being provided also to prepare the student for the tests.

After completing the lessons and Self-Progress Check Tests in each module, the student shall take the self-administered Module Tests and submit these to CAP College for correction and evaluation. The process shall be repeated for the remaining modules. When all the Module Tests of a subject have been submitted, the student may take the Final Examination for that particular subject. However, he may choose to finish all the Module Tests of all subjects before taking the Final Examinations.

Final Examinations are taken in person at CAP College or at its designated Distance Education Learning Centers. All accounts must be paid before the student may be allowed to take these examinations. The student must present his identification card when taking the Final Examinations. Two hours are allotted to complete the Final Examination for each subject.

For students residing or working abroad, arrangements will be made for them to take the examinations at the nearest Philippine Embassy, consulate office, place of worship or at a venue that shall be acceptable to both the College and the student. A proctor shall be assigned to administer the examinations. Proctor's fee and mailing expenses shall be charged to the students.

== College for the Deaf ==
The CAP College for the Deaf (CAP CFD) is the first college for the Deaf in Manila and one of the first post-secondary training programs for the Deaf in the Philippines. CAP CFD opened in 1989, giving hope to deaf high school graduates who are looking forward to college education that will prepare them to become productive members of Philippines society.

== Notable alumni ==
- Dingdong Avanzado – singer, actor, politician and TV host
- Carmi Martin – actress
- Onemig Bondoc – actor and television host
- Manilyn Reynes – successful actress, singer, TV host and commercial model
- Marvin Agustin – actor, chef and entrepreneur
- Ana Roces – actress

== See also ==
- Deafness in the Philippines
