= Web accessibility initiatives in the Philippines =

In 2003 and following years, initiatives were instituted to improve internet access for people with disabilities in the Philippines. These measures were inspired by the UNESCAP "Asia-Pacific Decade for Disabled Persons" (1993–2002). Key organizations included the government body National Council for the Welfare of Disabled Persons (Philippines) and the private sector body Philippine Web Accessibility Group (PWAG). The "Disabled Friendly Website Awards" were launched to encourage web designers to incorporate universal access. Since 2009 unhampered access to Information and Communications Technology (ICT) has been in the second National Human Rights Action Plan of the Philippine government.

== Focus on Information and Communication Technology ==
(6) Access to information and communication including ICT

In the last 10 years, there has been much progress in Information and Communication Technology (ICT) development, and it opens up many opportunities for people with disabilities in networking, solidarity, employment, and independent living. But it has also widened the gap between persons with disabilities and the non-disabled. The Digital divide includes inaccessibility to infrastructure for ICT, Internet, and ICT skills. These problems are acute in rural areas. The multi-media environment is creating barriers for people with visual disabilities. Three targets are set to improve the situation:

1) By 2005, persons with disabilities should have at least the same rate of access to the Internet and related services as the rest of citizens in a country of the region.

2) By 2004, international organizations should incorporate web accessibility standards for persons with disabilities in their international ICT standards.

3) Governments should adopt, by 2005, ICT accessibility guidelines for persons with disabilities in their national ICT policies.

== Timeline ==
1993–2002 – United Nations Economic and Social Commission for Asia and the Pacific (UNESCAP) proclaimed the “Declaration of Asia-Pacific Decade for Disabled Persons”. Being a member, the Philippines adopted the declaration.

January 15, 1993 – Proclamation No. 125 was issued by then President Fidel Ramos giving mandate to the National Council for the Welfare of Disabled Persons (Philippines) to coordinate activities and to monitor the observance of the Asian and Pacific Decade of Disabled Persons (1993–2002) in the Philippines.

2003–2012 – UNESCAP proclaimed the extension of Declaration of Asia-Pacific Decade for Disabled Persons.

May 2002 – UNESCAP adopted the resolution “Promoting an inclusive, barrier-free and rights-based society for people with disabilities in the Asian and Pacific region in the twenty-first century” naming it the “Biwako Millennium Framework”

May 3–7, 2003 – Interregional Seminar and Regional Demonstration Workshop on Accessible Information and Communications Technologies (ICT) to Persons with Disabilities was held at Bayview Park Hotel, Manila, Philippines where 11 countries from Asia-Pacific were represented. The Manila Accessible Information and Communications Technologies (ICT) Design Recommendations was drafted and adopted.

October 26–28, 2004 – First Regional Workshop on Accessible ICT for Persons with Disabilities was held in Tagaytay. Web accessibility was introduced to 25 webmasters from different government, non-government agencies, and the academe. Leo Valdes of Vision Office Support Services was the lecturer. Webmasters from the Luzon and Metro Manila areas were invited to attend.

Follow up activities were formed. These are:

1. Search for Good Practices – The National Computer Center (NCC) and NCWDP periodically review participants' websites for improvements and ideas. Model websites by participants are introduced during succeeding workshops.

2. Disabled-Friendly Website Awards – These were given to those participating websites who passed the accessibility recommendations set by NCC and NCWDP.

3. Development of Standards and Training Manuals – NCC takes a lead role in coordinating the development of technical recommendations in preparation for a national policy, and in the development of training manuals for these recommendations.

May 24–26, 2005 – Second Regional Workshop on Accessible ICT for PWDs was held in Marco Polo Hotel, Davao City. Mindanao webmasters and advocates attended this workshop.

June 2, 2005 – Philippine House of Representatives Official Website www.congress.gov.ph was the first recipient of “Disabled Friendly Website Award” given by NCWDP, National Computer Center, Commission on Information and Communications Technology (CICT), Department of Social Welfare and Development (DSWD) and Vision Office. Dahlia Villacorte, participant in Tagaytay workshop, was the web designer.

October 18–20, 2005 – Third Regional Workshop on Accessible ICT for PWDs was held at Golden Peak Hotel, Cebu City. This event is aimed for Visayas webmasters and advocates.

December 12, 2005 – Second “Disabled Friendly Website Award” was given to Adaptive Technology for Rehabilitation, Integration and Empowerment of the Visually Impaired (ATRIEV) with Ms. Lourdes Borgonia, a blind person, as web designer. She was also one of the participants during the Tagaytay workshop.

March 18 and 25, 2006 – Manila Christian Computer Institute for the Deaf (MCCID) developed four accessible websites for GOs and NGOs needing technical assistance and continues to do so. They also held two-Saturday seminar on Accessible ICT for deaf web designers. Ervin Reyes, deaf bronze medalist in the web design category during the 6th International Abilympics Skills Competition held in New Delhi, India was the lecturer. He is also one of the participants in the first workshop.

May 16–19, 2006 – Following three successful workshops organized by DSWD and NCWDP the Webmasters' Interface on Accessible ICT for PWDs held a national event in Mango Park Hotel, Cebu City. It brings together the country's webmasters, policy-makers, disability advocates, and ICT practitioners to forge a vision for accessible web content.

June 2, 2006 – Remberto I. Esposa Jr. of MCCID became the first Philippine web designer accepted as a member of the UK based international Guild of Accessible Web Designers.

June 29, 2006 – Post evaluation and appreciation meeting about the Cebu activity was held at Max's Restaurant, Quezon City. Also, the third “Disabled Friendly Website” award was given to Manila Christian Computer Institute for the Deaf with Remberto I. Esposa Jr. as the web designer. He was also the participant in the Tagaytay workshop.

Initial discussion on the forming of “Association of Accessible Web Designers” were made.

July 27, 2006 – After the proposal presented by Esposa and Reynaldo Mendoza, former web designer of De La Salle University website, the NCWDP board approved the recommendation of forming an ad hoc or core group of webmasters that will implement the consensus made by Cebu City participants.

August 11, 2006 – First initial and informal meeting of the core group held at the NCWDP Office. It was named Philippine Web Accessibility Group (PWAG).

August 27, 2006 – After five years of negotiations, countries meeting at United Nations Headquarters in New York have agreed on a new treaty to protect the rights of persons with disabilities. Paragraphs G and H of Article 9 pushing for accessible ICT for PWDs were largely based on “Manila Declaration and Manila Recommendations on Accessible ICT”, two outcome documents passed by 13 countries in the UN-funded “Interregional Workshop on Accessible ICT” hosted by the Philippines and submitted to the UN in 2003.

October 16, 2006 – The official Philippine Web Accessibility Group website was launched.

December 3, 2006 – In observance of the International Day of Disabled Persons, the National Council for the Welfare of Disabled Persons (Philippines) has relaunched their official website and was subjected for PWAG's validation.

December 17, 2006 – Additional five Philippine-designed websites were subjected to PWAG's evaluation and passed the accessibility compliance. The group also agreed on the following recommendations:

1. Access key Assignments

2. Visual Validation Checklist

January 7, 2007 – A few months after it was established, a total of 30 web developers and advocates from the Philippines and in other countries have joined PWAG.

February 14, 2007 – PWAG officially announces its Recommended Web Design Accessibility Checkpoints. The primary basis is still the adoption of the Manila ICT Design Recommendations. The term used in defining the priority checkpoints are Maturity Stage. A Maturity Stage 1 means the website needs to meet the requirements set by the Manila ICT Design Recommendations A Maturity Stage 2 means the website should meet the criteria set by PWAG.

February 19–23, 2007 – "Workshop on Accessible ICT" was held at Baguio attended by both the IT personnel and focal persons from the Department of Social Welfare and Development.

February 22, 2007 – Fourth "Disabled Friendly Website Award" was given to the website of the De La Salle University (DLSU) with Lemuel Cabia as part of its web development team. DLSU participated during the Tagaytay workshop.

February 22, 2007 – In order to encourage Filipinos to design accessible websites, five more institutions/web designers received the "Disabled Friendly Website Awards" under the initiative of PWAG. These are Bureau of Local Employment – Department of Labor and Employment, Cebu Doctors' University, Emilio Aguinaldo College, Nova Foundation for Differently Abled Persons, and personal website of Arielle Cruz.

May 9, 2007 – Accessites.org, the website honoring web designers that "meticulously and lovingly build artful yet accessible websites", presents the First Edition official website of Philippine Web Accessibility Group the "Notable Universal Design Award".

July 19, 2007 – The 102 page book Web Accessibility Guide for Filipinos is officially published and copyrighted. The book contains definition of web accessibility, types of assistive devices available, laws affecting disability in the Philippines, statistics of Filipino PWDs and Filipino Internet user statistics. It also details the history of web accessibility initiatives in the Philippines from 2003 up to the present.

July 20, 2007 – As an offshoot of the successful staging of Baguio Workshop on Accessible ICT held last February, focal persons for Persons with Disabilities of the Department of Social Welfare and Development in Region 1 held an "E-Accessibility Forum" last July 20 at Zigzag Hotel, San Fernando City, La Union. The activity coincides with the Philippine celebration of National Disability Prevention and Rehabilitation Week (July 19–23, 2007).

May 12, 2008 – After six years of deliberation and almost a year after its signing, the Philippines became the 23rd country that ratified the United Nations Convention on the Rights of Persons with Disabilities. Prayer and Walk for Unity for UN Convention on the Rights of Persons with Disabilities (UN-CRPD) Ratification was held on May 12 at SM Mall of Asia in Pasay.

August 25, 2008 – The National Council on Disability Affairs (Philippines) approved Board Resolution No. 13 requesting the National Computer Center – CICT to deputize Philippine Web Accessibility Group to undertake web accessibility assessments of government websites.

July 10, 2009 – The Philippine Web Designers Organization collaborated with NCDA and the Philippine Web Accessibility Group in giving out Disabled Friendly Website Awards to four more websites.

September 2009 – The Asia-Pacific Development Center on Disability in collaboration with National Council on Disability Affairs, Resources for the Blind, Inc. Philippines, Department of Foreign Affairs (Philippines), Department of Social Welfare and Development, National Computer Center, Adaptive Technology for Rehabilitation, Integration and Empowerment of the Visually Impaired (ATRIEV), MCCID College of Technology, Nova Foundation for Differently Abled Persons, and Philippine Web Accessibility Group developed a documentary DVD entitled "From Why to How through ICT: A story about ICT Accessibility by persons with disabilities in the Philippines".

December 10, 2009 – The inclusion of unhampered access to Information and Communications Technology (ICT) became part of the action plan of the second National Human Rights Action Plan of the Philippine government.

July 20, 2010 – As part of the National Disability Prevention and Rehabilitation Week, the NCDA in partnership with the Department of Transportation and Communications held a Web Accessibility Forum which invited web designers and key government stakeholders. Highlight of the activity is the announcement of Joint NCDA-National Council on Disability Affairs Memo Circular No. 1 Series of 2010, enjoining all government instrumentalities concerned, to implement accessible website design using the technical guidelines recommended by the Web Design Accessibility Recommendation (WDAR) Checkpoints of the PWAG.

== Manila Accessible ICT Design Recommendations ==
  - Facts

These are not inventions but rather an implementation based on recommendations.

Among the ICT design recommendations were:

1. Provide an Access Instruction page for visitors (explaining the accessibility features of the Website and providing an e-mail hyperlink for visitors to communicate problems with Webpage accessibility);

2. Provide support for text browsers and descriptive hyperlinks (links such as "this" and "click here" do not alone convey the nature of the target link);

3. Attach ALT (alternative) text to graphic images so that assistive computer technology such as screen readers can reach the content;

4. For each photograph contributing meaningful content to the page, provide a "D" hyperlink to a page providing descriptive text of the image;

5. Provide text transcriptions or descriptions for all audio and video clips;

6. Provide alternative mechanisms for online forms since forms are not supported by all browsers (such as e-mail or voice/TTY phone numbers);

7. Avoid access barriers, such as the posting of documents in Adobe PDF (Portable Document Format), non-linear format, frame format, or requiring visitors to download software to access the content. If posting in Adobe PDF, accessible HTML (Hypertext Markup Language), or ASCII text must also be posted by the Webmaster converting the document.

== Philippine Web Accessibility Group ==
Philippine Web Accessibility Group Logo

Philippine Web Accessibility Group (PWAG) is a privately led association of Filipino web designers and advocates. It is supervised by the PWAG's main objectives are:

1. To educate and encourage the general public on the benefits of including accessibility on their websites by providing information and assistance through workshops, seminars, e-groups, and other forums;

2. To adopt the Manila Accessible ICT Design Recommendations and recommend the web accessibility guidelines and standards in the Philippine setting. These are not inventions but rather an implementation of a founding group.
