= Phil Sports Federation of the Deaf =

- Sport: Deaf sports
- Jurisdiction: Philippines
- Abbreviation: PSFD
- Founded: 2007; 18 years ago
- Affiliation: CISS
- Headquarters: Quezon City, Metro Manila
- President: Lester Lagos
- Secretary: Rosemarie Palasigue
- (Philippines)

The Phil Sports Federation of the Deaf is the governing body for disability sports for deaf people in the Philippines.

The organization was established in 2007 as a result of the 4th National Congress of the Deaf and 6th General Assembly of Philippine Federation of the Deaf which was held in San Mateo, Rizal.

It is a member of the International Committee of Sports for the Deaf (CISS) and sends athletes to compete for the Philippines at the Deaflympics. The Philippines is represented at the CISS since 1999.
