= Ulster Society for Promoting the Education of the Deaf and the Blind =

School for the Deaf and Blind

The Ulster Society for Promoting the Education of the Deaf and the Blind (or simply the "Ulster Society") was founded around 1836.

The schools owned by the Ulster Society have a history dating back to 1831 when the first school for deaf children was opened in Belfast. The Board of Governors of the Ulster Society responsible for that school is now, over 175 years later, the same organisation which is responsible for the schools' buildings and grounds at Jordanstown.

The Ulster Institution has changed its location three times over the years. It moved from Donegall Street, then College Street (the site donated by The Belfast Charitable Society) to the prosperous Lisburn Road in Belfast in 1845 (a site now occupied by the Medical Department of Queen's University) and then to the present spacious site at Jordanstown in 1961 where the Schools is now known as Jordanstown School.

The Ulster Society sold most of its land at Jordanstown to a private developer to pay for a new purpose-built building project which was completed in 2011.
