= Manila Christian Computer Institute for the Deaf =

Christian Institute for the Deaf

Coordinates: 14°39′53″N 121°8′7″E

Manila Christian Computer Institute for the Deaf College of Technology, Inc.
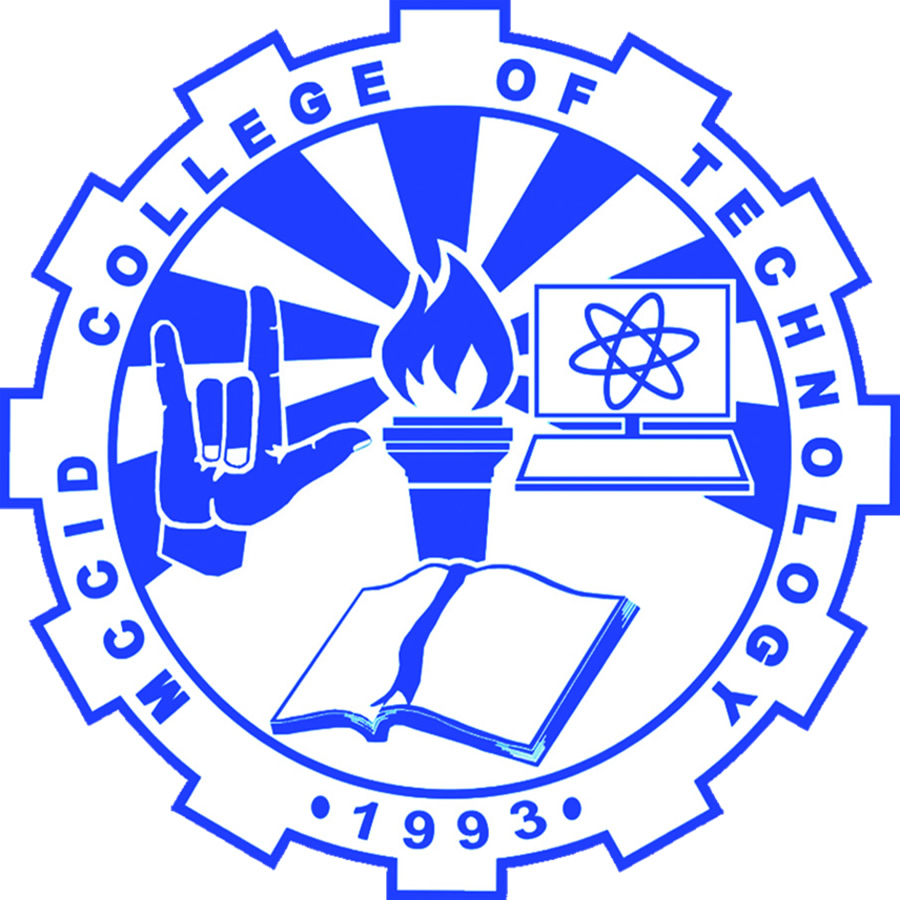
- Motto: God, Education, Technology, Life
- Type: special technical college for the deaf
- Established: 1993/2008
- Location: Purok Dos Sitio Buntong Palay, Bgy. Silangan, San Mateo, Rizal Province, Philippines
- Colors
- Nickname: MCCID College
- Mascot: Blue Lightning
- Website: www.mccid.edu.ph

Manila Christian Computer Institute for the Deaf (MCCID) is a non-sectarian, post-secondary, Christian foundation school for the deaf in the Philippines authorized by the Technical Education and Skills Development Authority (TESDA) to offer non-degree computer and other technical training programs.

It is also the only institute in the Philippines authorized by the government through TESDA to offer sign language and interpreting programs as well as courses for the deaf.

Manila Christian Computer Institute for the Deaf Foundation, Inc. was incorporated on September 9, 1993, by the Securities and Exchange Commission (Philippines) (SEC) as a non-stock, non-profit foundation. It was through the idea of two young Christian computer professionals, one hearing and one deaf, that they decided to establish an educational institution that focuses on improving the computer skills of the deaf.

On November 4, 2008, MCCID became MCCID College of Technology, Inc.

== Programs ==
These are the courses available for the deaf as authorized by the Technical Education and Skills Development Authority

- Diploma in Arts and Computer Design Technology - 3 years
- Diploma in Business Technology - 3 years
- Diploma in Business and Entrepreneurship - 3 years
- Certificate in Sign Language and Interpreting - 1 year
- Computer Software Operations Technology - 5 months

== Campus ==
=== Main Rizal Campus ===
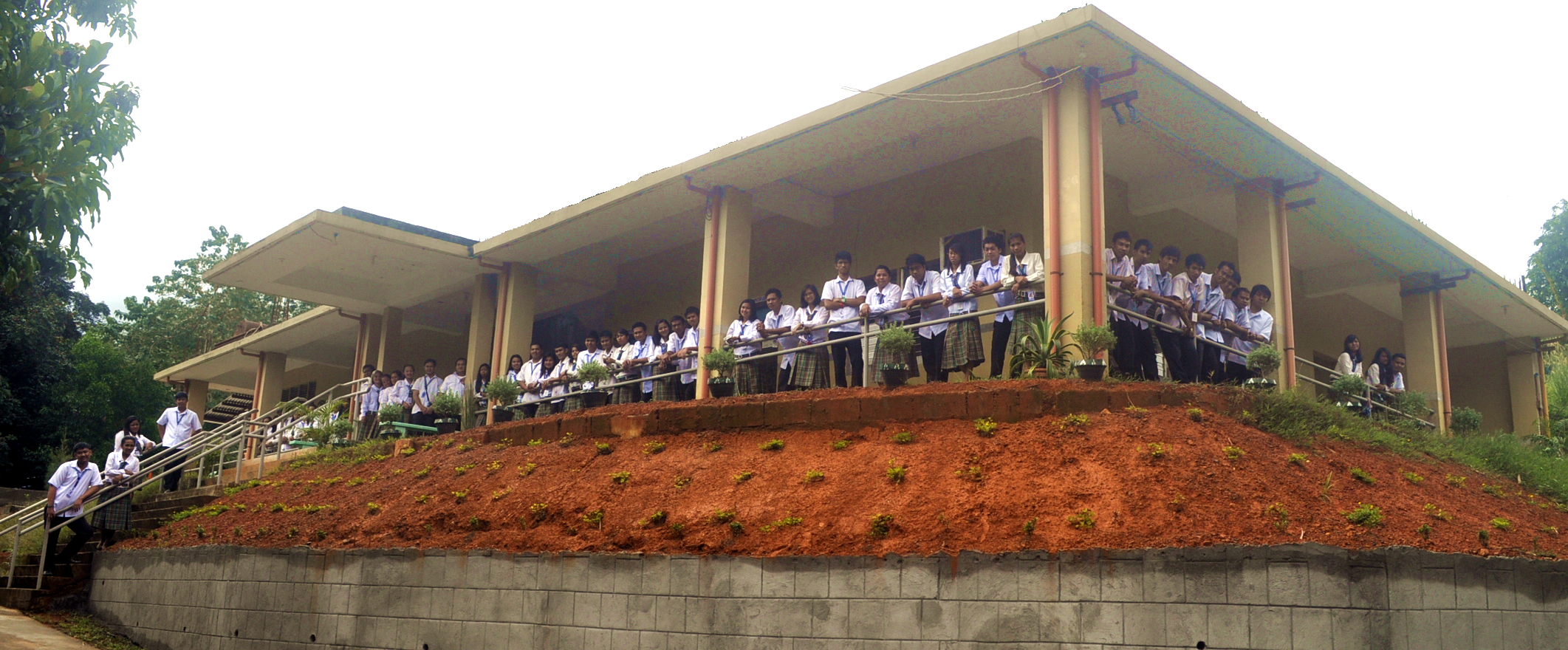
MCCID College School Building, San Mateo, Rizal

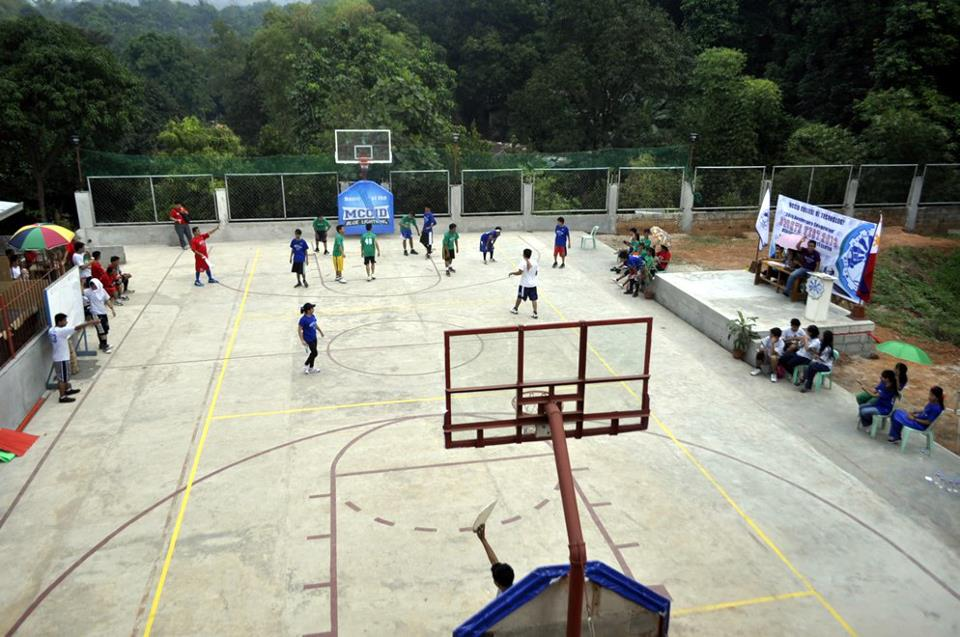
MCCID College Sports Area with Basketball/Volleyball Court, Futsal and Stage

From its old rented building in Cubao, Quezon City, the main campus is now permanently housed in a 400 square meter building in San Mateo, Rizal. It sits on a 6,000 sq.m rolling hills prime property site in Bgy. Silangan near the Marikina - San Mateo border. San Mateo is a first class urban municipality in the Province of Rizal. The construction has been undergoing since 2009 after the property was acquired. Current facilities available include sports area, mini-library, animation design room and computer laboratory.

=== Quezon Campus ===
In 2009, MCCID College opened its first community based campus in Tiaong, Quezon in partnership with Bartimaeus Center for Alternative Learning (Bethsaida, Inc.), a Community Based School for the Disabled Persons established in early 90s. The 1,400 sq. m. property housed a small school building with a computer lab and classrooms. The school services the deaf communities of Quezon Province as well as in lower parts of Laguna and the whole of Batangas. The school is partially funded by Liliane Foundation Philippines.

=== Pampanga Campus ===
After careful study from among key partners of Liliane Foundation Philippines (LFP) in Central Luzon, MCCID opened its second campus in City of San Fernando, Pampanga this 2010. The 300 sq.m prime property is owned by Innocencio Magtoto Memorial Foundation, Inc. As a flagship project of LFP under its Region III Cluster, MCCID will open its IT program to deaf high school graduates from Bulacan, Pampanga, Nueva Ecija and Zambales. Its main goal is to produce top quality deaf trainers who will then be deployed to different LFP partner-organizations (PO) nationwide as trainer experts/instructors. They will be responsible in teaching computers and other livelihood programs to deaf high school graduates from key cities and municipalities with LFP established partners.

== Services ==
MCCID College offers the following services to the students:

- Specially designed curricula and training to meet the industry standards;
- TESDA Scholarship grants for qualified Deaf students (High School honorees);
- Facilities like Local Area networks (LAN), high speed Personal Computers and Servers as well as up-to-date applications;
- Internet advantage using high speed DSL and Wi-Fi connection within the campus as well as providing personal e-mails using "studentname@mccid.edu.ph" and web pages;
- Custom-made laboratory manuals and imported computer books;
- Sign Language instructions by encouraging the use of the Filipino Sign Language;
- Guidance and career counseling;
- Guaranteed job placement programs for qualified Deaf graduates;
- Inter-school as well as national computer skills competition training programs;
- Livelihood and skills seminars and workshops provided by government institutions (TESDA, DOST, NCDA) as well as other private organizations;
- Sports and recreational activities

== Beliefs ==
MCCID College believes that every deaf individual is capable of doing jobs that hearing people do and that his handicap is not a hindrance to attain what is required in working at any type of environment.

MCCID assists the hearing impaired in getting a better chance to compete for employment, education and other opportunities like every other citizen in the Philippines.

== Objectives ==
Objectives are:

- to help the deaf, regardless of economic status, gain access to better employment in the field of computer and computer work applications through technical education;
- to give training to improve computer skills that can be compared to existing industry standards;
- to provide job assistance and placement for graduates for domestic employment;
- to develop computer based curricula and instructional materials for the deaf;
- to assist in the development of sign language for science and technology terms;
- to provide scholarships and free training seminars to qualified hearing impaired
- to help in the dissemination of information about deafness, deaf people and their culture.

== First in the Philippines ==
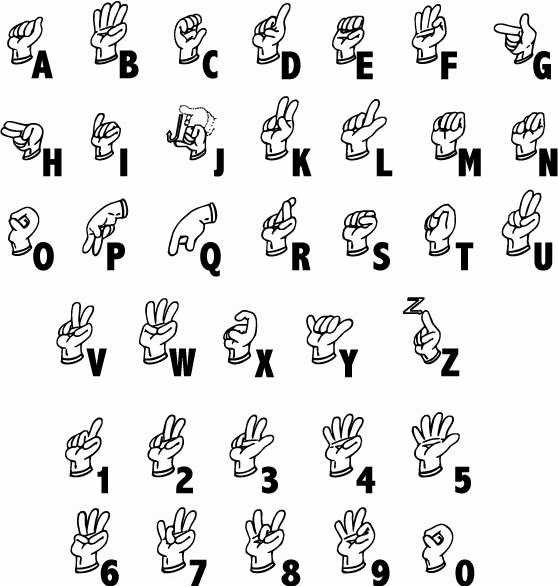
Filipino Sign Language is the Official Sign Language used by majority of deaf communities in the Philippines

MCCID is

- the first and currently the only post-secondary technical institute for the deaf authorized by the Philippine government.
- the only institute authorized by the government to offer a sign language course in the Philippines.
- the first institute for the deaf that includes Deaf Culture as part of its curriculum.
- the first school in the Philippines that published a series of comic strip focusing on deaf persons debuting on September 11, 2005.
- the first institute in the Philippines that is accepted as a member of the Convention of American Instructors for the Deaf (est. 1851) in 1995.
- the first observer and advocates of Web accessibility among deaf organizations during the Interregional Seminar and Regional Demonstration Workshop on ICT Accessibility attended by delegates from Asia and the Pacific.
- the first institute that published a book on Web Accessibility entitled "Basic Web Accessibility Guide for Filipinos.
- the first institute that designed the Filipino Sign Language Font which can be downloaded for free.

MCCID students were

- the first deaf person (Ervin Reyes) to win the Bronze Medal in Web Page Design Category during the 6th International Abilympics Skills Competition held in New Delhi, India last November 2003.
- the first deaf person to win the Gold Medal during the 10th Philippine National Skills Competition in Web Page Design category last September 2001.
- the first deaf person to win the Bronze Medal during the Asia Pacific Economic Cooperation (APEC) information technology (IT) camp in the information search category in Seoul, Korea last 2002.
- the first deaf recipient of 2004 Academic Excellence Award in National Capital Region awarded by TESDA.
- the first deaf group who received four Gold Medals of Excellence during the twelfth Philippine National Skills Competition last December 2005.
- the first deaf group that represented the country in the seventh International Abilympics Skills Competition to be held in Shizuoka, Japan in November 2007.
- the first deaf person ever worked in Malacañan Palace with the Office of the Philippine President.
- the first 100% pass rate in Data Encoding Skills Certification Exam among deaf sector conducted by TESDA 2003.
- six out of fifteen deaf persons ever worked in the Department of Foreign Affairs (Philippines).

MCCID website is:

- the first institute for the deaf in the Philippines that went online MCCIDOnline.net in 1997 and has recently celebrated its twelfth year online.
- the first website in the Philippines that focus on news and issues about deaf in the country.
- the first deaf related website recipient of the "Disabled Friendly Website Award" given by the National Computer Center and the National Council for the Welfare of Disabled Persons last June 29, 2006 as part of the Web Accessibility Initiatives in the Philippines.
- the first in the Philippines to become a member of UK based international Guild of Accessible Web Designers.
- the first technical school in the Philippines that passed the Web Accessibility standards set by the World Wide Web Consortium.

== Government/industry linkages ==
To enhance the training component of MCCID, the following government agencies and private organizations forged a collaboration and partnership with the school.

- Air-21 Philippines - Air-21 Philippines, one of the premier courier service in the Philippines, provides employment opportunities to MCCID students.
- Asia Pacific Development Center on Disability - APCD provides instructional materials related to disabilities as well as conducting information technology related workshops and trainings.
- Asia Pacific Digital Opportunity Center - Taiwan-based ADOC donated computers to MCCID and plans to assist in conducting and sponsoring IT related trainings for the deaf.
- The Department of Foreign Affairs (Philippines) accepted MCCID graduates to work in the government's passport and other divisions.
- Liliane Foundation Philippines - As one of its funding partners, Liliane provides scholarship assistance and on-the-job training for MCCID students.
- Metals Industry Research and Development Center - As one of its training partners, MIRDC provides appreciation course seminars and on-the-job training for MCCID students.
- Monde Nissin Corporation - MCCID is currently the only institutional partner of Monde Nissin which caters to Persons With Disabilities. They now employ two deaf graduates in their production division.
- National Computer Center - NCC is a national government agency that provides IT related computer trainings for MCCID students.
- National Council on Disability Affairs (Philippines) - NCDA provides job assistance to MCCID graduates and supports its activities in promoting disability rights and skills. MCCID also designed its official website, which won as Best Organization Website in 2009 Digital Filipino Web Awards.
- Nova Foundation for Differently Abled Persons - Nova Foundation provides additional corporate trainings and assistance to MCCID students.
- Philippine Web Accessibility Group - PWAG provides trainings and seminars on Internet and web accessibility to MCCID students.
- Take One Animation Studio - Take One Animation Studio provides 2D animation trainings as well as employment opportunities to MCCID students.
- TESDA Women's Center - TESDA Women's Center provides MCCID with free livelihood and entrepreneurship training workshops and seminars
