= International Deaf Education Association =

The International Deaf Education Association (IDEA) is an organization focused on educating the deaf in Bohol, Philippines initiated by the United States Peace Corps, under the leadership of Dennis Drake. The organization is a non-profit establishment that provides education to the impoverished and neglected deaf and blind children in the Philippines. The institution is able to hold special education classes on the islands of Bohol and Leyte through sponsorship program financially supported by American and European participants. Established in 1985, IDEA has the mission to give assistance to the deaf community in the Philippines in order for them to achieve self-reliance through the provision of “academic, vocational, physical, spiritual, and economic opportunities”. As a holistic ministry, IDEA aims to develop a society wherein deaf people can benefit from “social and economic equality, exchanging isolation for community, and servitude for self-reliance”.

== See also ==
- Philippine Sign Language
- Philippine Federation of the Deaf
- Bohol Deaf Academy, high school for the Deaf in Bohol, Philippines
- Second International Congress on Education of the Deaf
- Ulster Society for Promoting the Education of the Deaf and the Blind
- Blindness and education
