= Jordanstown Schools =

School in Northern Ireland

- Jordanstown, Belfast, Northern Ireland

Information
- Established: 1831; 195 years ago
- Principal: Adam Smith
- Website: www.jordanstownschool.org

Jordanstown Schools is a school for deaf children and children with visual impairments, including blindness. It is based in Jordanstown, north of Belfast, Northern Ireland. Despite Presbyterian and Anglican roots, it is now non-denominational.

The school is owned by the Ulster Society for Promoting the Education of the Deaf and the Blind whose roots are in the Claremont Institution of Dublin and the Belfast Auxiliary Society. The society, formed 25 April 1821, was to send Ulster's deaf children to the Claremont Institution, which was Ireland's first school for the deaf and dumb, founded in 1816.

Belfast Day School for the Deaf and Dumb was founded in 1831 and was originally based in a small schoolroom at Donegall Street Congregational Church in the city centre. In 1845 it moved to the Lisburn Road, a site now occupied by the medical department of Queen's University. In 1961 it again moved, to its present site in Jordanstown, close to the University of Ulster.

The school offers both primary and secondary education, catering for children between 4 and 19.

Adam Smith was appointed principal in 2016.

== Languages use ==
Northern Ireland Sign Language is practiced in the Deaf Department with several children from families where Northern Ireland Sign Language or/and Irish Sign Language is used on a daily basis. However the Schools promote the Total Communication policy with the focus on using Signed English.

English is used in the Blind Department.
