= Philippine School for the Deaf =

School for the deaf in the Philippines

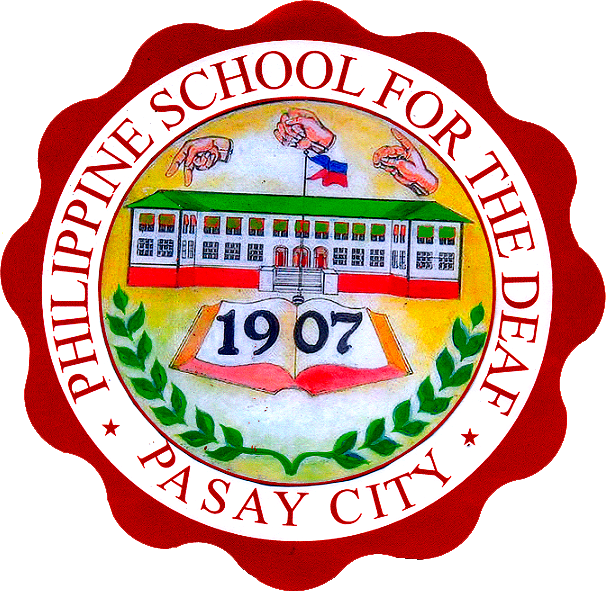

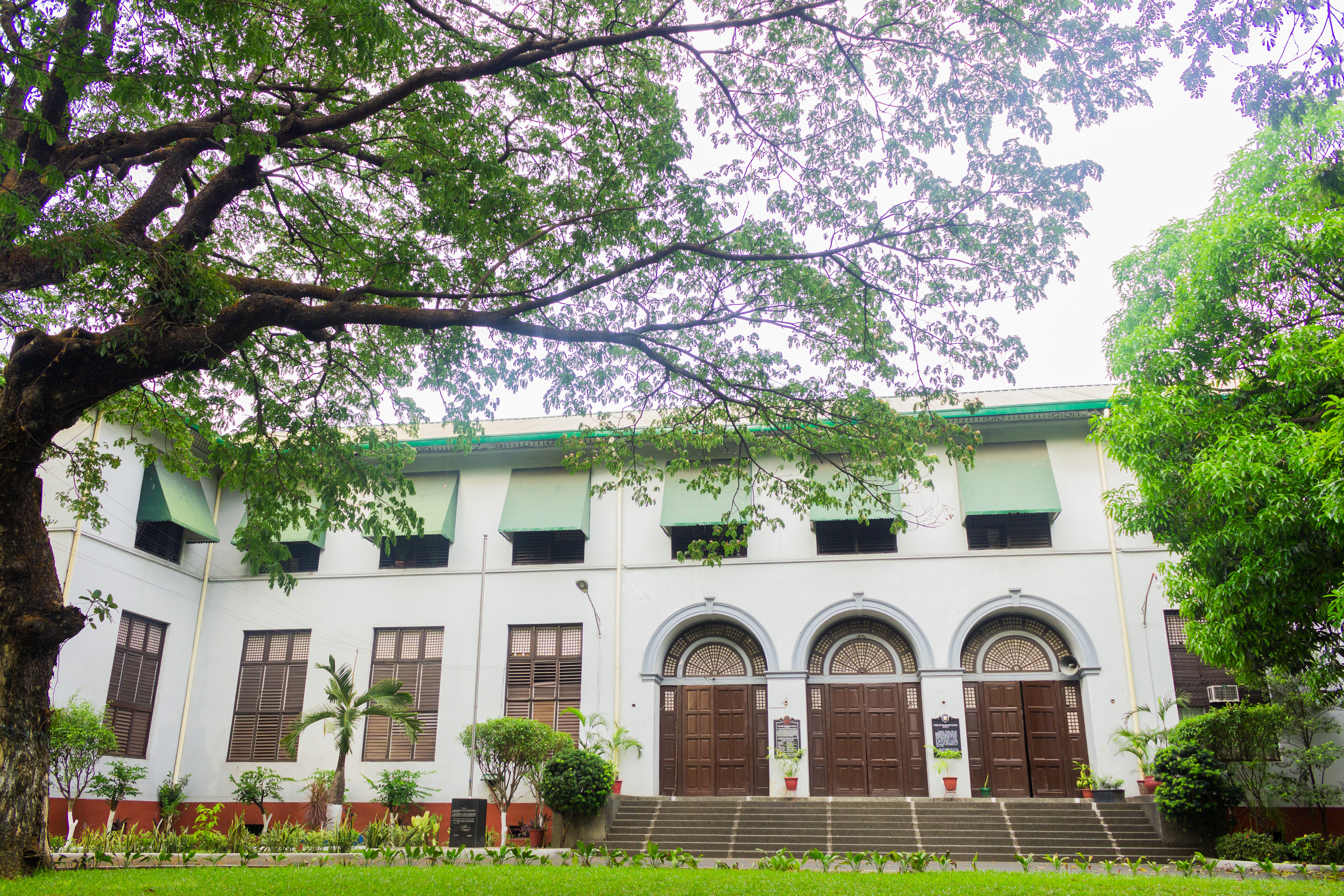

Location
- Galvez Avenue corner Figueroa Street; Pasay; Philippines; 14.54223°N 120.99566°E

Information
- Former name: School for the Deaf and Blind
- Established: 1907
- Status: Active
- Language: Filipino Sign Language

The Philippine School for the Deaf (PSD), formerly known as the School for the Deaf and Blind (SDB), is a learning institution for individuals with hearing impairments in the Philippines.

Established in 1907, the institution is a semi-residential school and is the only deaf school owned by the Philippine government.

== History ==
The school's establishment in 1907 was caused by David Barrows, an American anthropologist and the Director of Education at the time, inviting Delia Delight Rice to the Philippine Islands. Rice is a teacher for people who are deaf and daughter of deaf parents. She played a role in initiating programs for individuals with hearing and visual impairments in the Philippines.

PSD's first class consist of a three pupils, two deaf and one blind, in a small rented house in Ermita, Manila. In 1923, the school moved to its present location along Harrison Boulevard, occupying a two-floor, semi-concrete structure.

=== Creation of the PNSB ===
In 1963, the School for the Deaf and Blind underwent a significant change when it was separated into two distinct institutions by virtue of Republic Act 3562 or an act to promote the education of the blind in the Philippines. The Philippine National School for the Blind (PNSB) was separated from PSD and became independent in 1970.

== Heritage status ==
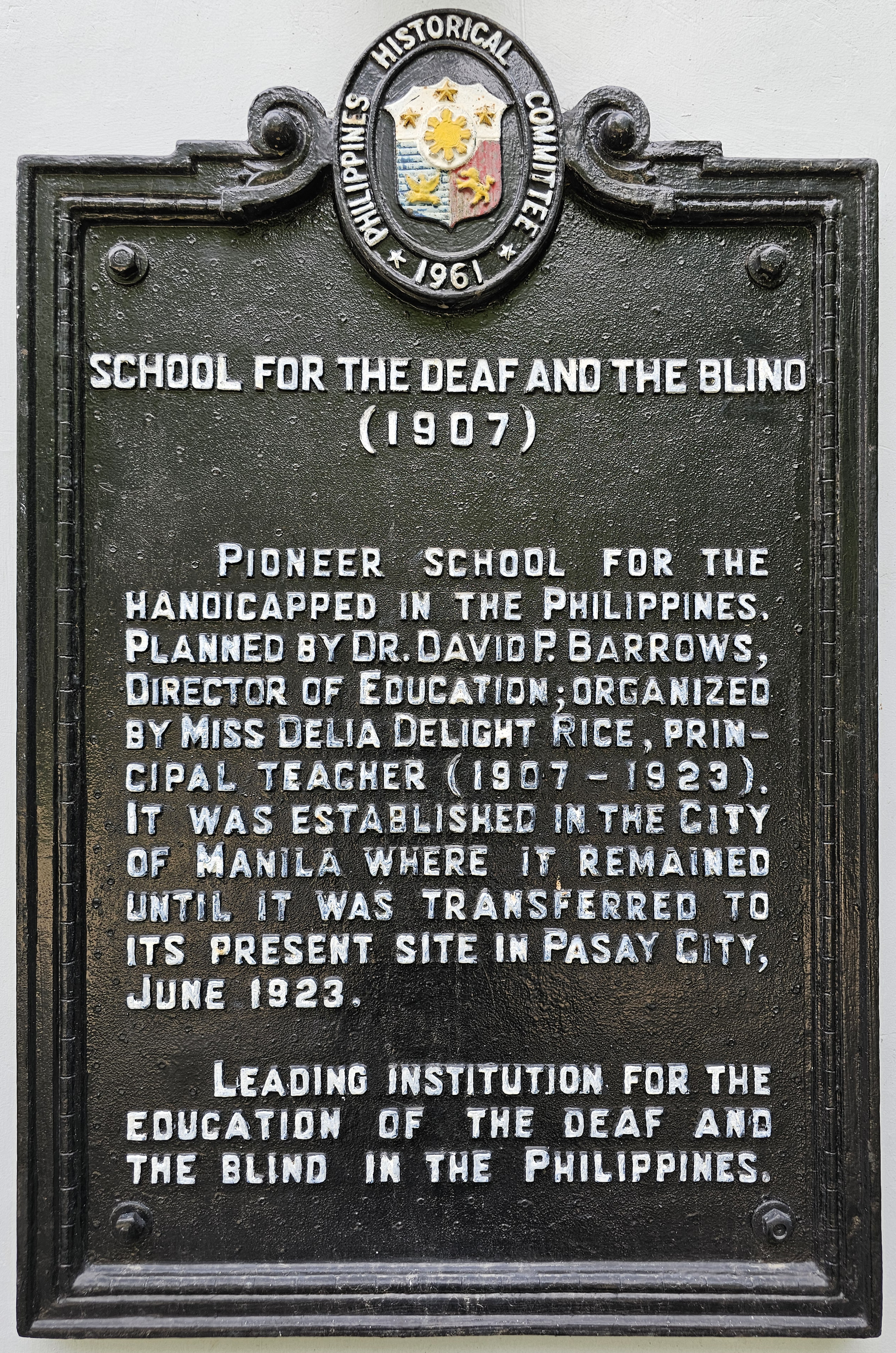
Historical marker

In 1961, the National Historical Commission of the Philippines installed a historical marker on the school. In 2018, the National Museum of the Philippines recognized the school's main building as an Important Cultural Property.
