= National Council on Disability Affairs =

- Abbreviation: NCDA
- Formation: January 4, 1981
- Location: Isidora Street, Brgy. Holy Spirit, Diliman, Quezon City, 1127 Philippines
- Executive Director: Glenda D. Relova (2024)
- Budget: ₱52.44 million (2020)
- Employees: 34 (2024)
- Website: www.ncda.gov.ph

The National Council on Disability Affairs (NCDA; Filipino: Pambansang Sanggunian Ukol sa Ugnayang Pangmaykapansanan), formerly known as the National Council for the Welfare of Disabled Persons (NCWDP), is the Philippine government agency mandated to formulate policies and coordinate the activities of all agencies, whether public or private, concerning disability issues and concerns. As such, the NCWDP is the lead agency tasked to steer the course of program development for persons with disabilities and the delivery of services to the sector.

Under Presidential Executive Order No. 709 issued last February 26, 2008, it redefines the functions and organizational structure of the National Council for the Welfare of Disabled Persons (NCWDP) and renames it as the "National Council on Disability Affairs (NCDA)."

NCDA is tasked to monitor the implementation of several laws to ensure the protection of persons with disabilities (PWD)s' civil and political rights. These laws include the Republic Act No. 7277, otherwise known as Magna Carta for Disabled Persons, Batas Pambansa Blg. 344 or Accessibility Law. Also included are Republic Act 6759 or White Cane Act and ILO Convention No. 159 or the Vocational Rehabilitation of Persons With Disability. It has also been tasked, through Proclamation No. 125, to coordinate activities and to monitor the observance of the Asian and Pacific Decade of Disabled Persons (1993–2002) in the Philippines. Proclamation No. 125 was issued by the President Fidel V. Ramos on January 15, 1993, to enjoin both the government and the private entities to organize projects based on the policy categories mentioned in the agenda for action of the decade.

NCDA was an attached agency of the Department of Social Welfare and Development (DSWD). However, President Gloria Macapagal Arroyo ordered the Office of the President to further strengthen the government programs for the welfare of persons with disabilities. Executive Secretary Eduardo Ermita said the President effected the transfer through Executive Order No. 676 to closely monitor and improve the government action and program development for persons with disabilities and delivery of services to the sector.

On April 5, 2011, NCDA was again transferred back to the Department of Social Welfare and Development based on Executive Order No. 33 issued by President Benigno Aquino III. The DSWD Secretary will become the ex-officio chairman of the council.

== History ==
Based on historical accounts the government's concern for the disabled persons began as early as 1917 and the national concern for rehabilitation was manifested by non-government organizations as well. On January 16–20, 1978, the country hosted the Second International Conference on Legislation Concerning the Disabled organized by the Rehabilitation International's national affiliate, the Philippine Foundation for the Rehabilitation for Disabled Persons (PFRD). During the said conference, President Ferdinand Marcos signed Presidential Decree No. 1509 creating the National Commission Concerning Disabled Persons (NCCDP). NCCDP was tasked to prepare and adopt an integrated and comprehensive long-term National Rehabilitation Plan (NRP).

From the time of its inception in 1978, the Philippine Foundation for the Rehabilitation of Disabled, Inc. (PFRD) served as the commission's Secretariat to assist the NCCDP Board in the implementation of its objectives and functions. This arrangement stayed in effect until P.D. 1509 was amended by Presidential Decree No. 1761 on January 4, 1981.

With the success of the important work began during the International Year of Disabled Persons in 1981, the Decade of Disabled Persons (1981–1991) was proclaimed for nationwide observance on December 17, 1981, with NCCDP as lead agency.

== Powers and functions ==
- Formulate policies on disability prevention and rehabilitation for the welfare of persons with disabilities.
- Formulate research and development policies on health, education, labor and social welfare for persons with disabilities.
- Undertake continuing research and related studies on various topics pertaining to disability prevention, rehabilitation and equalization of opportunities for persons with disabilities.
- Formulate integrated and comprehensive long and medium-term national plans on the welfare of persons with disabilities.
- Establish and maintain linkages and networking with local and international organizations, including organization of and for persons with disabilities.
- Conduct program evaluation and monitoring, consultative meetings and symposia on issues related to disability prevention and rehabilitation.
- Propose legislation and initiate advocacy programs for the welfare of persons with disabilities.
- Develop a broad public information and dissemination program on disability prevention, rehabilitation, full participation and equalization of opportunities.
- Submit periodic reports to the DSWD Secretary on activities of the council.
- Establish and maintain a data bank and referral system on disability prevention, rehabilitation, full participation and equalization of opportunities.

== Objectives ==
1. To formulate and advocate policies according to internationally and nationally accepted standards in the areas of prevention of the causes of disability, rehabilitation and equalization of opportunities for Persons With Disabilities (PWDs).
2. To develop, promote and regularly review the national plan for the prevention, rehabilitation, full participation and equalization of opportunities for persons with disabilities.
3. To coordinate, monitor and evaluate the implementation of policies, plans and programs.
4. To advocate/promote respect for rights and privilege of Persons With Disabilities.

== Thrusts and directions for 2008 ==
1. Maintains and strengthens coordination and networking with local government units, non-government organizations, people's organizations and other concerned agencies and get their commitment to implement programs in line with national and international mandates on disability;
2. Promotes the institutionalization of Community Based Rehabilitation (CBR), Non-Handicapping Environment (NHE), accessible Information and Communications Technology (ICT) for persons with disability as part of Web accessibility initiatives in the Philippines, Republic Act No. 9442 or the Amendment of the Magna Carta for the Disabled Persons, 1% budgetary allocation for persons with disability and older persons and other emerging disability trends and concerns;
3. Strengthens the Regional Committees for the Welfare of Disabled Persons as a structure for consultation and coordination through the provision of technical assistance and resource augmentation to link with local government units;
4. Intensifies advocacy in support of programs for persons with disability and other disability-related matters, i.e. education, skills development or training on ICT;
5. Monitors and assesses the implementation of the national and international mandates on disability in consultation with concerned government organizations, non-government organizations, people's organizations and local government units;
6. Strengthens database on disability for policy formulation and program development.
7. Conducts policy review and consultation dialogues with different stakeholders, right holders and duty bearers in preparation for the participation on the United Nations Convention on the Rights of Persons with Disabilities.

== National and international non-government agency affiliates/partners ==
- Abilympics Philippines – This organization is in collaboration with NCDA. It aims to coordinate with various agencies to produce participants to compete in the International Abilympics (IA).
- Asia-Pacific Center on Disability – NCDA is one of the focal organizations of APCD.
- Autism Society Philippines – The ASP is a grassroots NGO, representing individuals on the autism spectrum and the families who care for them on various NCDA Sub-Committees and the NCDA board.
- Digital Access for Information Systems – NCDA is one of the member organizations of DAISY Consortium.
- Handicap International Philippines – NCDA is one of the partners of Handicap International, a funding agency.
- Manila Christian Computer Institute for the Deaf Foundation – MCCID provides training and supports other programs of NCDA through the sub-committee on ICT.
- NCDA Accessible Online Learning System – Launched in December 2023, these free online courses on disability are an excellent way to learn about the challenges faced by people with disabilities and how to create a more inclusive society. The available courses vary from disability awareness and etiquette to accommodations and support units.
- Nova Foundation for Differently Abled Persons – Nova Foundation heads the NCDA sub-committee on ICT.
- Philippine Web Accessibility Group – NCDA initiates directly supervises and monitors the activities of PWAG.
- Vision Office Limited, Canada – Vision Office conducts trainings for NCDA.

== See also ==
- Philippines at the Summer Paralympics
- Paralympic Committee of the Philippines
- Phil Sports Federation of the Deaf
