= Bohol Deaf Academy =

Coordinates: 9.63049°N 123.87913°E

Information
- School type: Private School, High School
- Established: 2005
- Gender: Mixed

Bohol Deaf Academy (BDA) is a private, coed, residential Philippine high school for deaf students, located in Tagbilaran City, Bohol. It was established in 2005 and specializes in advanced academic and vocational instruction for college and work-bound students.

BDA is the only private school for the deaf in Bohol, and is recognized by the Philippine Department of Education as a "school of excellence". All of BDA's students receive partial or full scholarships—the only residential high school in the region with such status.

The school is unique in the Philippines for offering a "Vocational Oriented" curriculum, which reserves 2 days per week for vocational skills training, as well as on-the-job training with International Deaf Education Association (IDEA), Philippines, the largest private employer of deaf people in the country. This relationship allows for internships in Dao Diamond Hotel—the only deaf-run hotel in the Philippines, the Garden cafe, a restaurant employing deaf adults, established in 1984, and the IDEA construction team.

BDA is also the only high school in the country with a deaf Principal, deaf vocational and academic teachers, and deaf maintenance personnel.

Completed in 2005, BDA was constructed by deaf masons, carpenters, painters, and welders from IDEA.
