= Jordanstown =

Townland near Belfast, Northern Ireland

Coordinates: 54.67991°N 5.888672°W

Jordanstown: Irish: Baile Mhic Shiúrdáin
- Townland and electoral ward
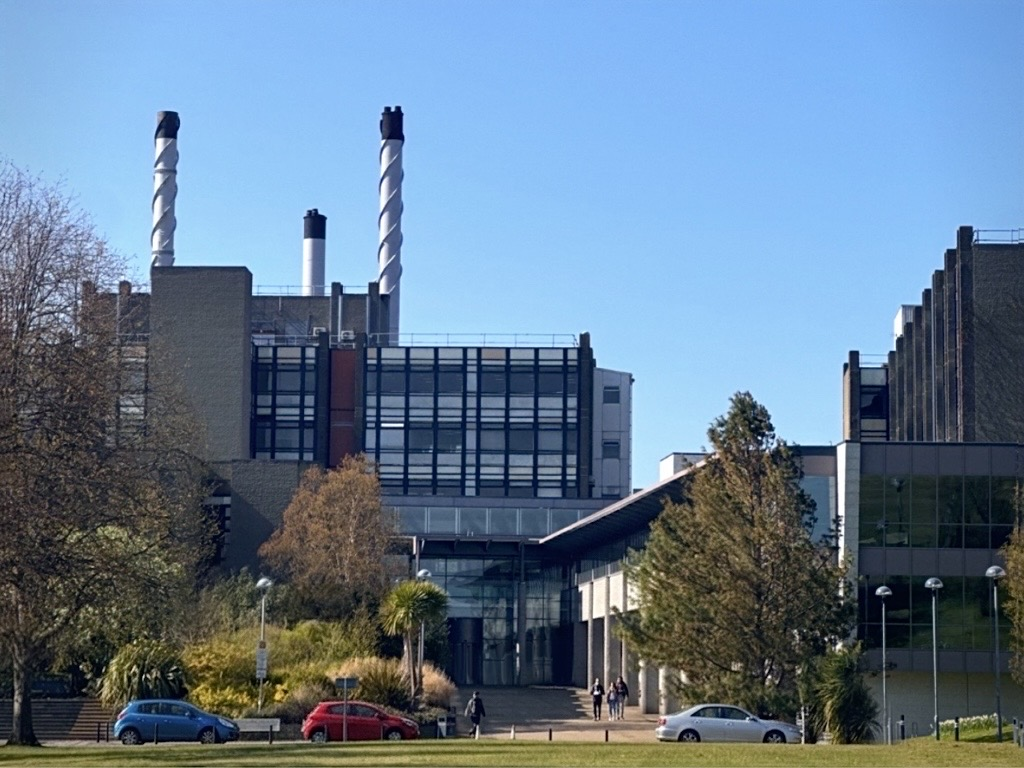
- Ulster University Jordanstown (UUJ)

- Location within Northern Ireland
- Population: 6,225 (2011 census)
- District: Antrim and Newtownabbey
- County: County Antrim
- Country: Northern Ireland
- Sovereign state: United Kingdom
- Post town: Newtownabbey
- Postcode district: BT37
- Dialling code: 028
- UK Parliament: East Antrim
- NI Assembly: East Antrim

Jordanstown is a townland (of 964 acres) and electoral ward in County Antrim, Northern Ireland. It is within the urban area of Newtownabbey and the Antrim and Newtownabbey Borough Council area. It is also situated in the civil parish of Carnmoney and the historic barony of Belfast Lower. It had a population of 6,225 in the 2011 census, with an average age of 40.

Jordanstown is home to Ulster University (formerly the University of Ulster), often referred to as UUJ. The campus developed from a former Ulster College of Physical Education and later formed part of the Ulster Polytechnic before the establishment of the university, which became the largest university campus in Northern Ireland. The area is served by local public transport, including bus services connecting the campus with Belfast and surrounding towns. Jordanstown railway station also provides connections to Belfast and Larne.

Jordanstown also includes a bowling club, a few schools and shops. It also has a beach and seafront park area called Loughshore Park, which hosts various events throughout the year including the three-day Loughshore Festival over the last weekend in August. The park sits on the shore of Belfast Lough.

== Name ==
The place is named from an Anglo-Norman family called Jordan who accompanied John de Courcy to Carrickfergus in 1182. The surname Jordan is ultimately derived from the river Jordan, the name of which was used as a Christian name by returning crusaders who brought back Jordan water to baptise their children [Bally Jurdon 1604].

== History ==
=== Development ===
Jordanstown was a semi-rural district until the 1950s when it expanded rapidly with the construction of new housing. Middle-class families were attracted to the area due to its location adjacent to Belfast Lough and the railway station, which provides access to Belfast City Centre.

Jordanstown railway station was opened on 1 February 1853.

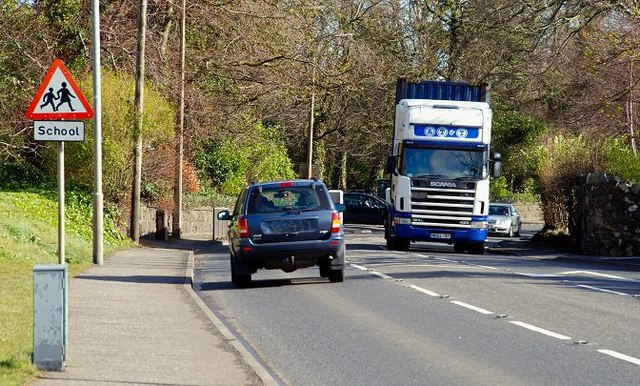
Shore Road in Jordanstown in 2008

In 2015, sections of the Shore Road (A2) were upgraded, improving traffic flow between Jordanstown, Belfast, and surrounding settlements. The improvements enhanced road access to the Jordanstown campus of Ulster University and other local destinations.

=== The Troubles ===
On 4 November 1983, 28-year-olds John Martin and Stephen Fyfe, and 29-year-old William McDonald, all members of the Royal Ulster Constabulary (RUC), were killed by a Provisional Irish Republican Army time bomb, hidden in the ceiling of a classroom, which exploded during a lecture to RUC members at the Ulster Polytechnic, Jordanstown, now a campus of Ulster University. Nuala O'Loan, in her capacity as a prison independent custody visitor (ICV), who was named Northern Ireland's first Police Ombudsman many years later, was injured in the attack, and, pregnant, lost the baby she was carrying at the time.

== Demography ==
Jordanstown is a small settlement within Belfast Metropolitan Urban Area (BMUA). On census day 2011 (27 March 2011), the usually resident population of Jordanstown was 6,225. Of these:

- 97.61% were from the white (including Irish Traveller) ethnic group
- 14.22% belong to or were brought up Catholic and 74.84% belong to or were brought up in a 'Protestant and other (non-Catholic) Christian (including Christian related)'
- 70.94% indicated that they had a British national identity, 11.45% had an Irish national identity and 33.80% had a Northern Irish national identity.

On census day in 2001 (29 April 2001), there were 5,494 people living in Jordanstown. Of these:

- 16.9% were under 16 years old and 48.9% were aged 60 and above
- 32.6% of the population were male and 50.5% were female

== Churches ==
Churches in Jordanstown include St. Patrick's Church (Church of Ireland) and Whiteabbey Presbyterian Church (Presbyterian).

== Sport ==
U.U.J. F.C. play association football in the Northern Amateur Football League.

== Education ==
- Whiteabbey Primary School
- Jordanstown Schools for the Deaf and Blind.
- Thornfield House School for those with Specific Speech Impairments.
- Rosstulla Special School
- Monkstown Community High School
- Belfast High School
- University of Ulster

== Local councillors and MLAs ==
Jordanstown is covered by the university district electoral area of Newtownabbey Borough Council. Local Members of the Legislative Assembly (MLAs) for the area include:

- Sammy Wilson (DUP)
- David Hilditch (DUP)
- Alastair Ross (DUP)
- Roy Beggs (UUP)
- Ken Robinson (UUP)
- Sean Neeson (Alliance)

== Notable people ==
- Stephanie Meadow (born 1992), professional golfer
- Andrew Reid (born 1994), motorcycle racer
- James Purdon Martin (1893–1984), neurologist
