= Languages of the United Kingdom =

- Main: English (98%; (Note: According to the 2011 census, 53,098,301 people in England and Wales, 5,044,683 people in Scotland, and 1,681,210 people in Northern Ireland can speak English "well" or "very well"; totalling 59,824,194. Therefore, out of the 60,815,385 residents of the UK over the age of three, 98% claim they can speak English "well" or "very well".) national and de facto official) (Note: Statistics indicate respondents who can speak at least "well")
- Minority: UK Wide: Scots (2.23%) (2022), (Note: Out of the 67.6 million residents of the UK over the age of three, 1,508,540 (2.23%) can speak Scots,) Welsh (0.9%) (2021), (Note: The usual resident population of England and Wales was 59,597,300 on Census Day, 21 March 2021, and 538,300 said they could speak Welsh) Cornish (<0.01% L2), Scottish Gaelic, Irish, Ulster Scots (0.05%), Angloromani, Beurla Reagaird, Shelta
- Immigrant: Arabic, Bengali, Dari, Gujarati, French, Latvian, Chinese, Punjabi, Polish, Portuguese, Romanian, Russian, Spanish, Tamil, Urdu
- Signed: British Sign Language, (0.2%) (Note: Statistics undertaken with assumptions and large disparities between home countries) Irish Sign Language, Signed English, Northern Ireland Sign Language
- Keyboard layout: British QWERTY

English is the most widely spoken and de facto official language of the United Kingdom. A number of regional and migrant languages are also spoken. Indigenous Indo-European regional languages include both Celtic languages and Germanic languages. The main Celtic languages are grouped into Goidelic, which includes Irish and Scottish Gaelic; and the surviving Western Brittonic language, Welsh. Close relatives of English in the West Germanic language group include Scots and Ulster Scots.

There are many non-native languages spoken by immigrants and their descendents, including Polish, Hindi, and Urdu. British Sign Language is sometimes used as well as liturgical and hobby languages such as Latin and Cornish, a Celtic revived form of Southwestern Brittonic.

Welsh is spoken by 538,300 people in Wales according to the 2021 census. Data from the Annual Population Survey shows that 28%, or roughly 862,700 people, of Wales' population aged three and over were able to speak the language in March 2024. (Note: The Welsh government and the ONS are investigating the inconsistency between responses.) Welsh is a de jure official language under the Welsh Language (Wales) Measure 2011 in Wales.

Irish is spoken by about 124,000 people in Northern Ireland and is a de jure official language there since 2022.

== List of languages and dialects ==
=== Living ===
The table below outlines living indigenous languages of the United Kingdom, England, Scotland, Wales and Northern Ireland. The languages of the Crown Dependencies, the Channel Islands and the Isle of Man, are not included here.

Language	Type	Spoken in	Numbers of speakers in the UK
English	West Germanic	Throughout the United Kingdom	UK (2021 data): 91.1% (52.6 million) of usual residents, aged three years and over, had English (English or Welsh in Wales) as a main language, down from 92.3%, or 49.8 million, in 2011
Scots (Ulster Scots in Northern Ireland)	West Germanic	Scotland (Scottish Lowlands, Caithness, Northern Isles) and Berwick-upon-Tweed; Northern Ireland (Counties Down, Antrim, Londonderry)	UK (2022 data): 2.23%; Scotland: 27.74%, or 1,508,540 Scots speakers (Scottish Census Data 2022)
Welsh	Celtic (Brythonic)	Wales (especially west and north) and parts of England near the Welsh–English border Welsh communities in major English cities such as London, Birmingham, Manchester and Liverpool.	UK (2021 data): 0.90%; Wales (2021 data): 17.8%; 538,300 people in the 2021 census. An estimation of 862,700 people, or 28%, of Wales' population aged three and over were able to speak the language in March 2024. (Note: England: 110,000 (estimated speakers in 2001) with 8,200 first language speakers (2011 census); Scotland and Northern Ireland: 1,000 (estimated speakers in 2001))
British Sign Language	BANZSL	Throughout the United Kingdom	151,056, of whom 86,700 are deaf: England: 127,000 (of whom 73,000 are deaf); Scotland: 12,556 (7,200); Wales: 7,200 (4,000); Northern Ireland 4,300 (2,500), 2011 Census data.
Irish	Celtic (Goidelic)	Northern Ireland, with communities in Glasgow, Liverpool, Manchester, London etc.	Northern Ireland: 71,872 (2021 census data)
Angloromani	Mixed	Spoken by English Romanichal Traveller communities in England, Scotland and Wales	90,000 (1990 data)
Scottish Gaelic	Celtic (Goidelic)	Scotland (Scottish Highlands and Hebrides with substantial minorities in various Scottish cities); A small community in London	UK (2022 data): 0.20%; Scotland (2022 data): 135,915, or 2.5%, of the Scottish population at the time of Scotland's 2022 census
Shelta	Mixed	Spoken by Irish Traveller communities throughout the United Kingdom	Est. 30,000.
Cornish	Celtic (Brythonic)	Cornwall (even smaller minorities of speakers in Plymouth, London, and South Wales)	In the 2021 UK Census, 567 people noted that they could speak Cornish. This was 0.00083% of the UK or 0.099% of the Cornish population of 570,300.
Irish Sign Language	Francosign	Northern Ireland	Unknown
Northern Ireland Sign Language	BANZSL	Northern Ireland	Unknown

==== Anglic ====
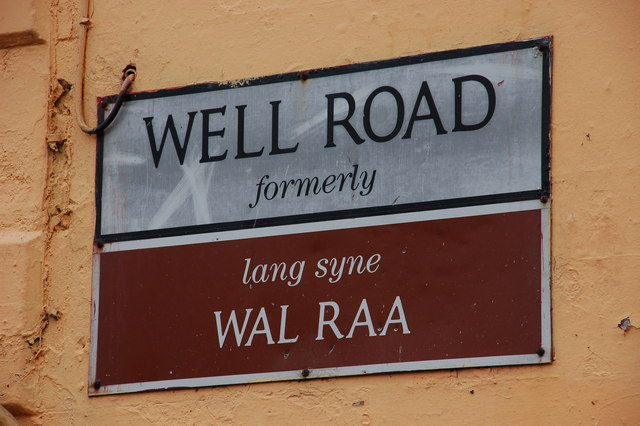
A street sign in Ballywalter, Northern Ireland, in English and Ulster Scots

- British English
  - English English (as spoken in England)
    - Northern English
      - Cheshire dialect
      - Cumbrian
      - Northumbrian
      - Geordie (of Newcastle-upon-Tyne and surrounding area)
      - Lancastrian (Lancashire, northern parts of Greater Manchester, eastern parts of Merseyside and surrounding area)
      - Mackem (of Sunderland and surrounding area)
      - Mancunian (Greater Manchester, Cheshire East and surrounding area)
      - Yorkshire/Tyke
      - Scouse (Liverpool and other parts of Merseyside, Cheshire West, parts of North Wales and surrounding area)
    - East Midlands English
    - West Midlands English
      - Black Country (of Dudley, Wolverhampton, Walsall and Sandwell)
      - Brummie (spoken in Birmingham)
      - Potteries (North Staffordshire, centred on Stoke on Trent)
    - Southern England English
      - East Anglian
      - Estuary English
      - London
        - Cockney
        - Multicultural London English
      - West Country dialects (Bristol, Devon, Dorset, Somerset; also parts of Gloucestershire, Wiltshire and Herefordshire)
        - Cornish English
  - Scottish English
    - Highland English
  - Welsh English
    - Cardiff dialect (additional varieties of which spoken throughout South Wales)
  - Hiberno English
    - Ulster English
  - Sign Supported English (a sign language based on English, not BSL)
- Scots
  - Insular Scots
    - Shetland dialect
    - Orcadian
  - Northern Scots
    - Doric
  - Central Scots
    - Glaswegian
  - Southern Scots
  - Ulster Scots

==== Insular Celtic ====
- Brythonic languages
  - Western Brittonic languages
    - Welsh
  - Southwestern Brittonic languages
    - Cornish
- Goidelic languages
  - Irish
    - Ulster Irish
  - Scottish Gaelic
    - Beurla Reagaird
  - Manx

==== Mixed ====
- Angloromani
- Scottish Cant
- Shelta

==== Sign languages ====
- BANZSL
  - British Sign Language
    - Northern Ireland Sign Language
- Francosign
  - Irish Sign Language

=== Extinct ===
- Insular Celtic
  - Brythonic
    - Cumbric
    - Pictish
  - Goidelic
    - Galwegian Gaelic
- Anglic
  - Old English
    - Middle English
      - Yola
      - Fingalian
      - Early Scots
        - Middle Scots
- Nordic
  - Old Norse
    - Norn
- Indic
  - Romani
    - Welsh Romani
- Romance
  - Anglo-Norman
- Kentish Sign
  - Old Kentish Sign

== Regional languages and statistics ==
Main languages of residents of the United Kingdom, 2021
English	91.1%
Scots	2.23%
Welsh	0.90%
Scottish Gaelic	0.20%
Irish	0.10%
Cornish	0.00083%

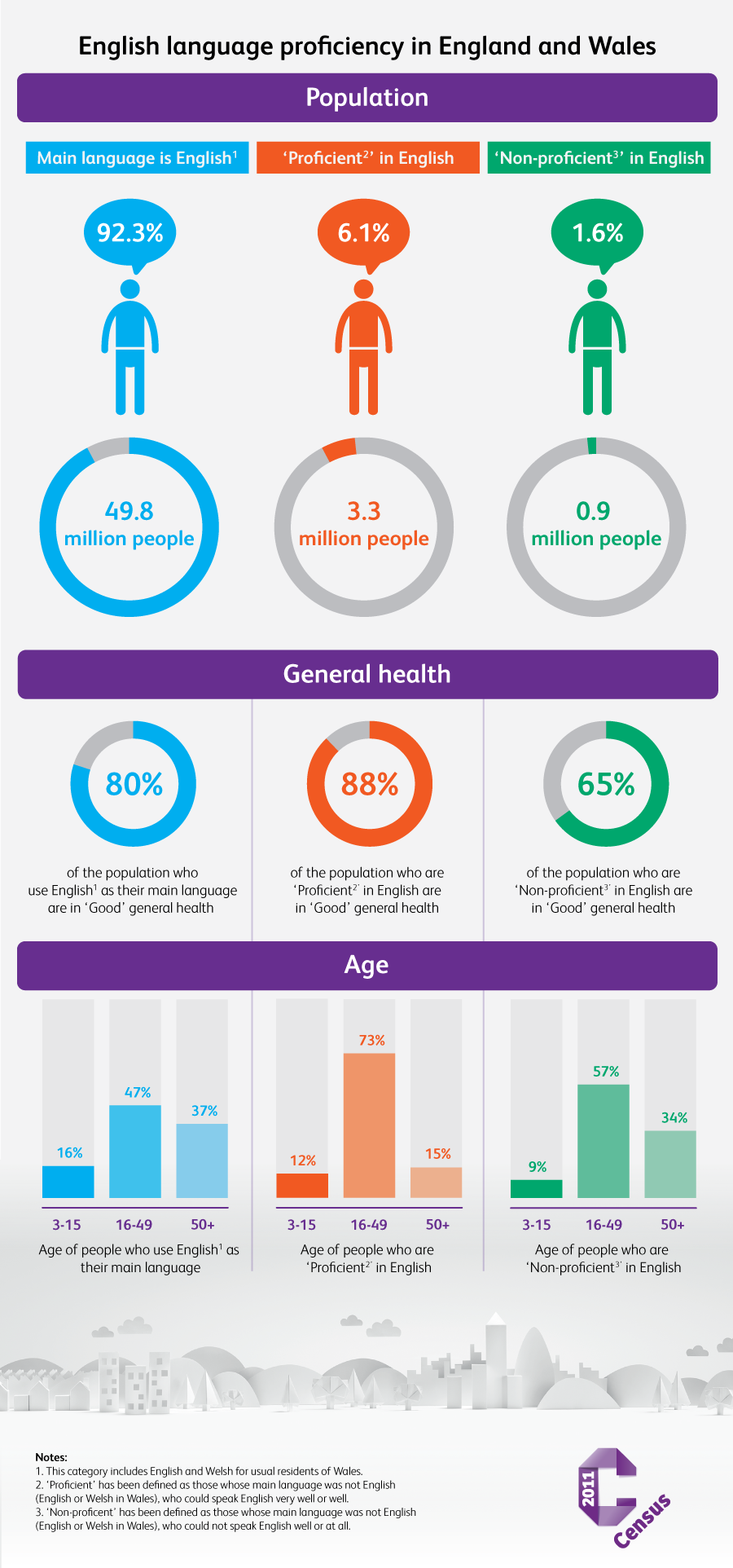
English language proficiency in England and Wales in 2011. The 'English' category included Welsh for usual residents of Wales.

The share of London's population whose main language is English, 2021

=== England ===
==== English ====
In the 2011 UK census, 98% of people over the age of three were reported as speaking English.

English is a West Germanic language brought around the 5th century CE to the east coast of what is now England by Germanic-speaking immigrants from around present-day northern Germany, who came to be known as the Anglo-Saxons. The fusion of these settlers' dialects became what is now termed Old English: the word English is derived from the name of the Angles. English soon displaced the previously predominant Common Brittonic and British Latin throughout most of England.

The English language spread into what was to become south-east Scotland under the influence of the Anglian medieval kingdom of Northumbria. Following the economic, political, military, scientific, cultural, and colonial influence of Great Britain and the United Kingdom from the 18th century, via the British Empire, and of the United States since the mid-20th century, it has been widely dispersed around the world, and become the leading language of international discourse.

Many English words are based on roots from Latin, because Latin in some form was the lingua franca of the Christian Church and of European intellectual life. The language was further influenced by the Old Norse language, with Viking invasions and settlements in England from the 8th to the 11th centuries.

The Norman conquest of England in 1066 gave rise to heavy borrowings from Old French, and vocabulary and spelling conventions began to give what had now become Middle English the superficial appearance of a close relationship with Romance languages. The Great Vowel Shift that began in the south of England in the 15th century is one of the historical events marking the separation of Middle and Modern English.

==== Cornish ====
Cornish, a Brythonic Celtic language related to Welsh, was spoken in Cornwall throughout the Middle Ages. Its use began to decline from the 14th century, especially after the Prayer Book Rebellion in 1549. The language continued to function as a first language in Penwith in the far west of Cornwall until the late 18th century, with the last native speaker thought to have died in 1777.

A revival initiated by Henry Jenner began in 1903. In 2002, the Cornish language was named as a historical regional language under the European Charter for Regional or Minority Languages. The UN classes it as a critically endangered language.

=== Wales ===
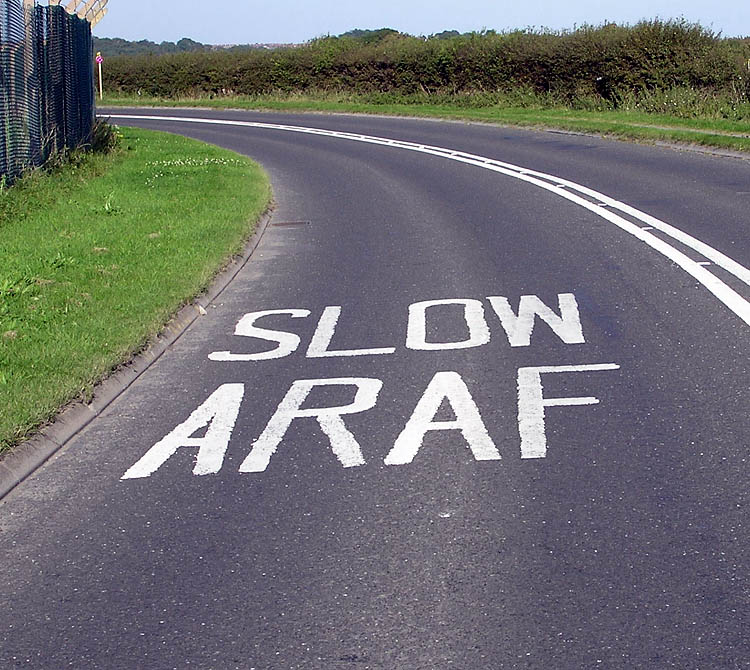
Bilingual road markings near Cardiff Airport, Vale of Glamorgan

Welsh (Cymraeg) emerged in the 6th century from Brittonic, the common ancestor of Welsh, Breton, Cornish, and dead language known as Cumbric. Welsh is thus a member of the Brythonic branch of the Celtic languages, and is spoken natively in Wales.

The Welsh Language Board indicated in 2004 that 553,000 people (19.7% of the population of Wales in households or communal establishments) were able to speak Welsh. Based on an alternative definition, there has been a 0.9 percentage point increase when compared with the 2001 census, and an increase of approximately 35,000 in absolute numbers within Wales. Welsh is therefore a growing language within Wales. Of those 553,000 Welsh speakers, 57% (315,000) were considered by others to be fluent, and 477,000 people consider themselves fluent or "fair" speakers. 62% of speakers (340,000) claimed to speak the language daily, including 88% of fluent speakers.

There is some controversy over the actual number who speak Welsh: some statistics include people who have studied Welsh to GCSE standard, many of whom could not be regarded as fluent speakers of the language. Conversely, some first-language speakers may choose not to report themselves as such. These phenomena, also seen with other minority languages outside the UK, make it harder to establish an accurate and unbiased figure for how many people speak it fluently. Furthermore, no question about Welsh language ability was asked in the 2001 census outside Wales, thereby ignoring a considerable population of Welsh speakers – particularly concentrated in neighbouring English counties and in London and other large cities. It is estimated that 110,000 to 150,000 people in England speak Welsh.

The 2011 census recorded an overall reduction in Welsh speakers, from 582,000 in 2001 to 562,000 in 2011, despite an increase in the size of the population—a 2% drop (from 21% to 19%) in the proportion of Welsh speakers.

The 2021 United Kingdom census indicated that on census day the population of England and Wales was 59.6 million. Of this population, roughly 538,300 people noted that they could speak Welsh, or 0.90% of the population. Within Wales, this percentage grows to 17.8%. Data from the Annual Population Survey shows that 28%, or roughly 862,700 people, of Wales' population aged three and over were able to speak the language in March 2024. 32.5% (1,001,500) reported that they could understand spoken Welsh, 24.7% (759,200) could read and 22.2% (684,500) could write in Welsh.

Both the English and Welsh languages have official, but not always equal, status in Wales. English has de facto official status everywhere, whereas Welsh has limited, but still considerable, official, de jure, status in only the public service, the judiciary, and elsewhere as prescribed in legislation. The Welsh language is protected by the Welsh Language Act 1993 and the Government of Wales Act 1998.

Since 1998, it has been common, for example, for almost all British Government Departments to provide both printed documentation and official websites in both English and Welsh. In December 2010, the National Assembly for Wales unanimously approved a set of measures to develop the use of the Welsh language within Wales. In February 2011, this measure received Royal Assent and was passed, making the Welsh language an officially recognised language within Wales.

=== Scotland ===
==== Scots ====
The Scots language originated from Northumbrian Old English. The Anglo-Saxon Kingdom of Northumbria stretched from south Yorkshire to the Firth of Forth from where the Scottish elite continued the language shift northwards. Since there are no universally accepted criteria for distinguishing languages from dialects, scholars and other interested parties often disagree about the linguistic, historical and social status of Scots. Although a number of paradigms for distinguishing between languages and dialects do exist, these often render contradictory results. Focused broad Scots is at one end of a bipolar linguistic continuum, with Scottish Standard English at the other. Consequently, Scots is often regarded as one of the ancient varieties of English, but with its own distinct dialects. Alternatively Scots is sometimes treated as a distinct Germanic language, in the way Norwegian is closely linked to, yet distinct from, Danish.

The 2011 UK census was the first to ask residents of Scotland about Scots. A campaign called Aye Can was set up to help individuals answer the question. The specific wording used was "Which of these can you do? Tick all that apply" with options for 'Understand', 'Speak', 'Read' and 'Write' in three columns: English, Scottish Gaelic and Scots. Of approximately 5.1 million respondents, about 1.2 million (24%) could speak, read and write Scots, 3.2 million (62%) had no skills in Scots and the remainder had some degree of skill, such as understanding Scots (0.27 million, 5.2%) or being able to speak it but not read or write it (0.18 million, 3.5%). There were also small numbers of Scots speakers recorded in England and Wales on the 2011 Census, with the largest numbers being either in bordering areas (e.g. Carlisle) or in areas that had recruited large numbers of Scottish workers in the past (e.g. Corby or the former mining areas of Kent).

The 2022 census for Scotland reported that of a population of 5,436,600 in Scotland, 1,508,540 people could speak Scots, or 27.74% of the population of Scotland. However, with an estimated population of 67.6 million in the UK in 2022, this percentage falls to 2.23% of the population of the UK.

==== Scottish Gaelic (Gàidhlig) ====
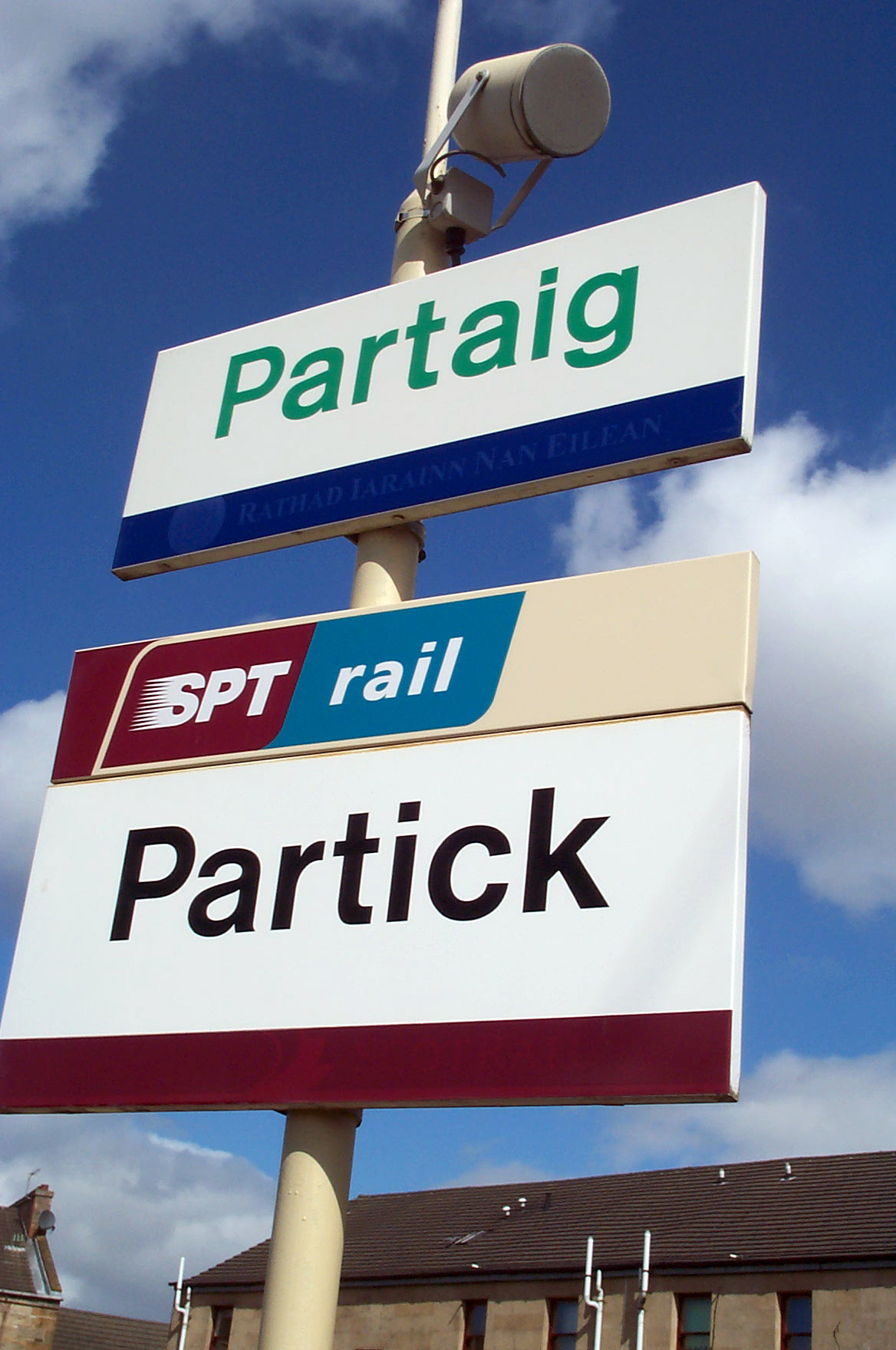
A bilingual sign, in Scottish Gaelic and English, at Partick railway station, Glasgow

Scottish Gaelic is a Celtic language native to Scotland. A member of the Goidelic branch of the Celtic languages, Scottish Gaelic, like Modern Irish and Manx, developed out of Middle Irish, and thus descends ultimately from Primitive Irish. Outside Scotland, a dialect of the language known as Canadian Gaelic exists in Canada on Cape Breton Island and isolated areas of the Nova Scotia mainland. This variety has around 2000 speakers, amounting to 1.3% of the population of Cape Breton Island.

The 2011 census of Scotland showed that a total of 57,375 people (1.1% of the Scottish population aged over three years old) in Scotland could speak Gaelic at that time, with the Outer Hebrides being the main stronghold of the language. The census results indicate a decline of 1,275 Gaelic speakers from 2001. A total of 87,056 people in 2011 reported having some facility with Gaelic compared to 93,282 people in 2001, a decline of 6,226. Despite this decline, revival efforts exist and the number of speakers of the language under age 20 has increased.

The Gaelic language was given official recognition for the first time in Scotland in 2005, by the Scottish Parliament's Gaelic Language (Scotland) Act 2005, which aims to promote the Gaelic language to a status "commanding equal respect" with English. However, this wording has no clear meaning in law, and was chosen to prevent the assumption that the Gaelic language is in any way considered to have "equal validity or parity of esteem with English". A major limitation of the act, though, is that it does not constitute any form of recognition for the Gaelic language by the UK government, and UK public bodies operating in Scotland, as reserved bodies, are explicitly exempted from its provisions.

=== Northern Ireland ===
==== Irish (Gaeilge) ====
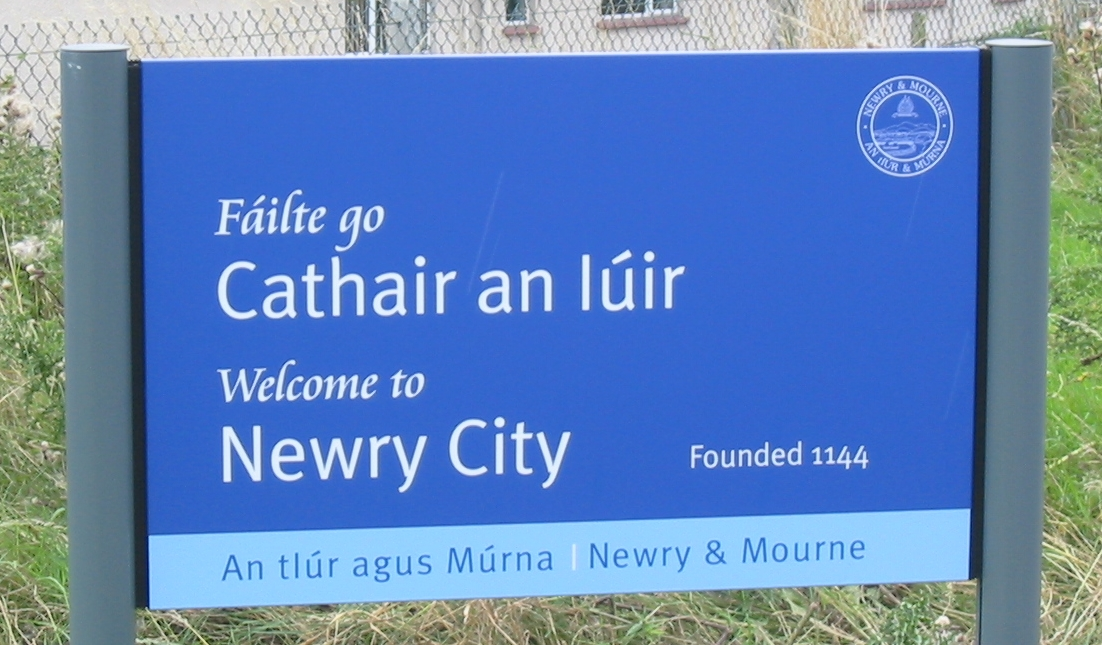
A bilingual sign, in Irish and English, in Newry

Irish was the predominant language of the Irish people for most of their recorded history, and they brought their Gaelic speech with them to other countries, notably Scotland and the Isle of Man where it gave rise to Scottish Gaelic and Manx.

It has been estimated that the active Irish-language scene probably comprises 5 to 10 per cent of Ireland's population. In the 2011 census, 11% of the population of Northern Ireland claimed "some knowledge of Irish" and 3.7% reported being able to "speak, read, write and understand" Irish. In another survey, from 1999, 1% of respondents said they spoke it as their main language at home.

==== Ulster Scots ====
2% speak Ulster Scots, seen by some as a language distinct from English and by some as a dialect of English, according to the 1999 Northern Ireland Life and Times Survey (around 30,000 speakers). Some definitions of Ulster Scots may also include Standard English spoken with an Ulster Scots accent. The language was brought to Ireland by Scottish planters from the 16th Century.

=== Principal minority language areas ===
- Welsh: North-West Wales: Percentage of speakers 69% (76% understand Welsh). Population: Gwynedd – 118,400 (2001 census)
- Scottish Gaelic: Outer Hebrides: Percentage of speakers 61%. Population: Na h-Eileanan Siar – 27,400 In the 2001 census, each island overall was over 50% Gaelic speaking – South Uist (71%), Harris (69%), Barra (68%), North Uist (67%), Lewis (56%) and Benbecula (56%). With 59.3% of Gaelic speakers or a total of 15,723 speakers, this made the Outer Hebrides the most strongly coherent Gaelic speaking area in Scotland.

=== British Sign Language ===
British Sign Language, often abbreviated to BSL, is the language of 125,000 Deaf adults, about 0.3% of the total population of the United Kingdom. It is not exclusively the language of Deaf people; many relatives of Deaf people and others can communicate in it fluently. Recognised as a language by the UK Government in March 2003, BSL has the highest number of monolingual users of any indigenous minority language in the UK.

=== UK census ===
Abilities in the regional languages of the UK, other than Cornish, for those aged three and above, in the UK census 2011.

Ability	Wales		Scotland				Northern Ireland			
Ability	Welsh		Scottish Gaelic		Scots		Irish		Ulster-Scots	
Ability	Number	%	Number	%	Number	%	Number	%	Number	%
Understands but does not speak, read or write	157,792	5.15%	23,357	0.46%	267,412	5.22%	70,501	4.06%	92,040	5.30%
Speaks, reads and writes	430,717	14.06%	32,191	0.63%	1,225,622	23.95%	71,996	4.15%	17,228	0.99%
Speaks but does not read or write	80,429	2.63%	18,966	0.37%	179,295	3.50%	24,677	1.42%	10,265	0.59%
Speaks and reads but does not write	45,524	1.49%	6,218	0.12%	132,709	2.59%	7,414	0.43%	7,801	0.45%
Reads but does not speak or write	44,327	1.45%	4,646	0.09%	107,025	2.09%	5,659	0.33%	11,911	0.69%
Other combination of skills	40,692	1.33%	1,678	0.03%	17,381	0.34%	4,651	0.27%	959	0.06%
No skills	2,263,975	73.90%	5,031,167	98.30%	3,188,779	62.30%	1,550,813	89.35%	1,595,507	91.92%
Total	3,063,456	100.00%	5,118,223	100.00%	5,118,223	100.00%	1,735,711	100.00%	1,735,711	100.00%
Can speak	562,016	18.35%	57,602	1.13%	1,541,693	30.12%	104,943	6.05%	35,404	2.04%
Has some ability	799,481	26.10%	87,056	1.70%	1,929,444	37.70%	184,898	10.65%	140,204	8.08%

Distribution of those who stated they could speak a regional language in the 2011 census.

Note: Scale used varies for each map.

Welsh

Scots

Scottish Gaelic

Irish

Ulster-Scots

== Status ==
Certain nations and regions of the UK have frameworks for the promotion of their autochthonous languages.

- In Wales, the Welsh Language Act 1993 requires English and Welsh to be treated equally throughout the public sector. This was further enforced through the passing of the Welsh Language (Wales) Measure 2011.
- In Scotland, the Gaelic Language (Scotland) Act 2005 gave the Scottish Gaelic language its first statutory basis. The Western Isles region of Scotland has a policy to promote the language.
- In Northern Ireland, the Identity and Language (Northern Ireland) Act 2022 will “provide official recognition of the status of the Irish language”, in addition to English, with Ulster Scots as an officially recognised minority language.

The UK government has ratified the European Charter for Regional or Minority Languages in respect of:

- Cornish (in Cornwall)
- Irish and Ulster Scots (in Northern Ireland)
- Manx (in the Isle of Man)
- Scots and Scottish Gaelic (in Scotland)
- Welsh (in Wales)

Under the European Charter for Regional or Minority Languages, which is not legally enforceable, but which requires states to adopt appropriate legal provision for the use of regional and minority languages, the UK government has committed itself to the recognition of certain regional languages and the promotion of certain linguistic traditions. The UK has ratified for the higher level of protection (Section III) provided for by the Charter in respect of Welsh, Scottish Gaelic and Irish.

Cornish, Scots in Scotland and Northern Ireland, in Northern Ireland officially known as Ulster Scots or Ullans, but in the speech of users simply as Scottish or Scots, are protected by the lower level (Section II).

The UK government has also recognised British Sign Language as a language in its own right of the United Kingdom.

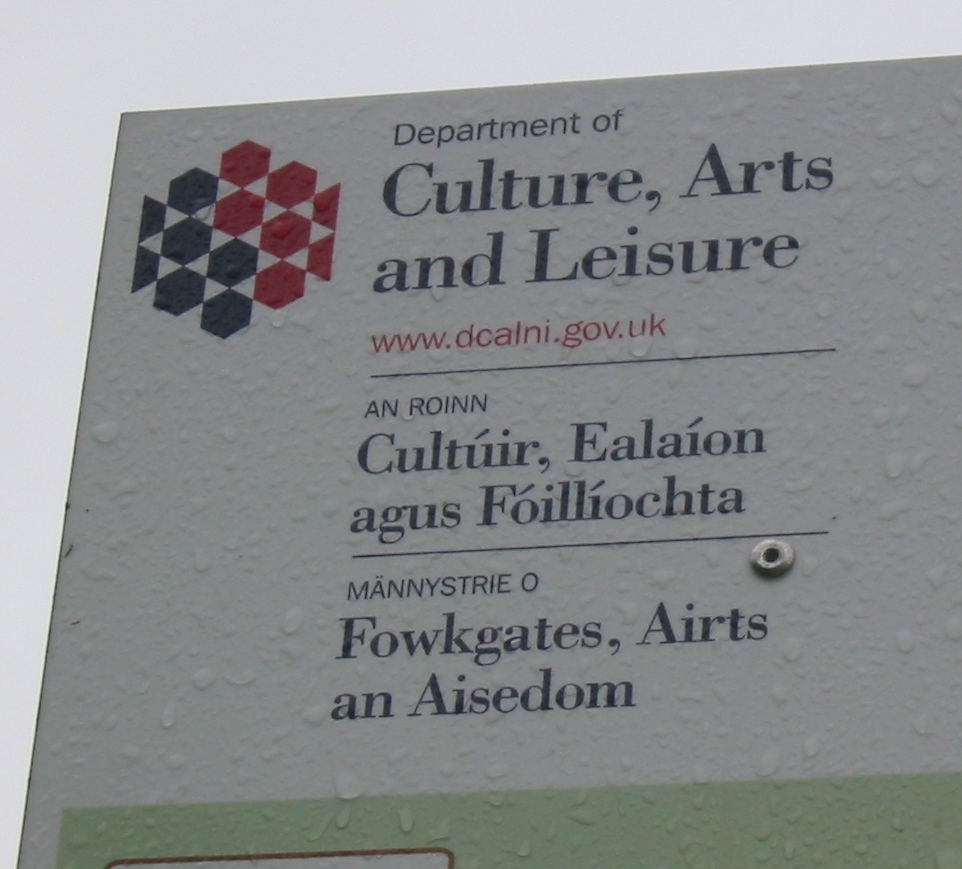
In Northern Ireland, the department responsible for culture displays official administrative identity in English, Irish and Ulster Scots

A number of bodies have been established to oversee the promotion of the regional languages: in Scotland, Bòrd na Gàidhlig oversees Scottish Gaelic. Foras na Gaeilge has an all-Ireland remit as a cross-border language body, and Tha Boord o Ulstèr-Scotch is intended to fulfil a similar function for Ulster Scots, although hitherto it has mainly concerned itself with culture. In Wales, the Welsh Language Commissioner (Comisiynydd y Gymraeg) is an independent body established to promote and facilitate use of the Welsh language, mainly by imposing Welsh language standards on organisations.

The Cornish Language Partnership is a body that represents the major Cornish language and cultural groups and local government's language needs. It receives funding from the UK government and the European Union, and is the regulator of the language's Standard Written Form, agreed in 2008.

=== Controversies ===
==== Language versus dialect ====
There are no universally accepted criteria for distinguishing languages from dialects, although a number of paradigms exist, which give sometimes contradictory results. The distinction is therefore a subjective one, dependent on the user's frame of reference.

Scottish Gaelic and Irish are generally viewed as being languages in their own right rather than dialects of a single tongue, but they are sometimes mutually intelligible to a limited degree – especially between southern dialects of Scottish and northern dialects of Irish (programmes in these two forms of Gaelic are broadcast respectively on BBC Radio nan Gàidheal and RTÉ Raidió na Gaeltachta), but the relationship between Scots and English is less clear, since there is usually partial mutual intelligibility.

Since there is a very high level of mutual intelligibility between contemporary speakers of Scots in Scotland and in Ulster (Ulster Scots), and a common written form was current well into the 20th century, the two varieties have usually been considered as dialects of a single tongue rather than languages in their own right; the written forms have diverged in the 21st century. The government of the United Kingdom "recognises that Scots and Ulster Scots meet the Charter's definition of a regional or minority language". Whether this implies recognition of one regional or minority language or two is a question of interpretation. Ulster Scots is defined in legislation (The North/South Co-operation (Implementation Bodies) Northern Ireland Order 1999) as: the variety of the Scots language which has traditionally been used in parts of Northern Ireland and in Donegal in Ireland.

While in continental Europe closely related languages and dialects may get official recognition and support, in the UK there is a tendency to view closely related vernaculars as a single language. Even British Sign Language is mistakenly thought of as a form of 'English' by some, rather than as a language in its own right, with a distinct grammar and vocabulary. The boundaries are not always clear cut, which makes it hard to estimate numbers of speakers.

==== Hostility ====
In Northern Ireland, the use of Irish and Ulster Scots is sometimes viewed as politically loaded, despite both having been used by all communities in the past. According to the Northern Ireland Life and Times Survey 1999, the ratio of Unionist to Nationalist users of Ulster Scots is 2:1. About 1% of Catholics claim to speak it, while 2% of Protestants claim to speak it. The disparity in the ratios as determined by political and faith community, despite the very large overlap between the two, reflects the very low numbers of respondents. Across the two communities 0% speak it as their main language at home. A 2:1 ratio would not differ markedly from that among the general population in those areas of Northern Ireland where Scots is spoken.

Often the use of the Irish language in Northern Ireland has met with the considerable suspicion of Unionists, who have associated it with the largely Catholic Republic of Ireland, and more recently, with the republican movement in Northern Ireland itself. Catholic areas of Belfast have street signs in Irish similar to those in the Republic. Approximately 14% of the population speak Irish, however only 1% speak it as their main language at home.

Under the 2006 St Andrews Agreement, the British government committed itself to introducing an Irish Language Act, and it was hoped that a consultation period ending in March 2007 could see Irish becoming an official language, having equal validity with English, recognised as an indigenous language, or aspire to become an official language in the future. However, with the restoration of the Northern Ireland Assembly in May 2007, responsibility for this was passed to the Assembly, and the commitment was promptly broken. In October 2007, the then Minister of Culture, Arts and Leisure, Edwin Poots MLA, announced to the assembly that no Irish Language Act would be brought forward. As of April 2016, no Irish Language Act applying to Northern Ireland has been passed, and none is currently planned.

Some resent Scottish Gaelic being promoted in the Lowlands. Gaelic place names are relatively rare in the extreme south-east, the part of Scotland which had previously been under Northumbrian rule, and the extreme north-east, part of Caithness, where Norse was previously spoken.

Two areas with mostly Norse-derived placenames (and some Pictish), the Northern Isles (Shetland and Orkney) were ceded to Scotland in lieu of an unpaid dowry in 1472, and never spoke Gaelic; its traditional vernacular Norn, a derivative of Old Norse mutually intelligible with Icelandic and Faroese, died out in the 18th century after large-scale immigration by Lowland Scots speakers. To this day, many Shetlanders and Orcadians maintain a separate identity, albeit through the Shetland and Orcadian dialects of Lowland Scots, rather than their former tongue.

Norn was also spoken at one point in Caithness, apparently dying out much earlier than Shetland and Orkney. The Norse speaking population were entirely assimilated by the Gaelic speaking population in the Western Isles. To what degree this happened in Caithness is a matter of controversy, although Gaelic was spoken in parts of the county until the 20th century.

==== Non-recognition ====
Scots within Scotland and the regional varieties of English within England receive little or no official recognition. The dialects of northern England share some features with Scots that those of southern England do not. The regional dialects of England were once extremely varied, as is recorded in Joseph Wright's English Dialect Dictionary and the Survey of English Dialects, but they have died out over time so that regional differences are now largely in pronunciation rather than in grammar or vocabulary.

Public funding of minority languages continues to produce mixed reactions, and there is sometimes resistance to their teaching in schools. Partly as a result, proficiency in languages other than "Standard" English can vary widely.

== Immigrant languages ==
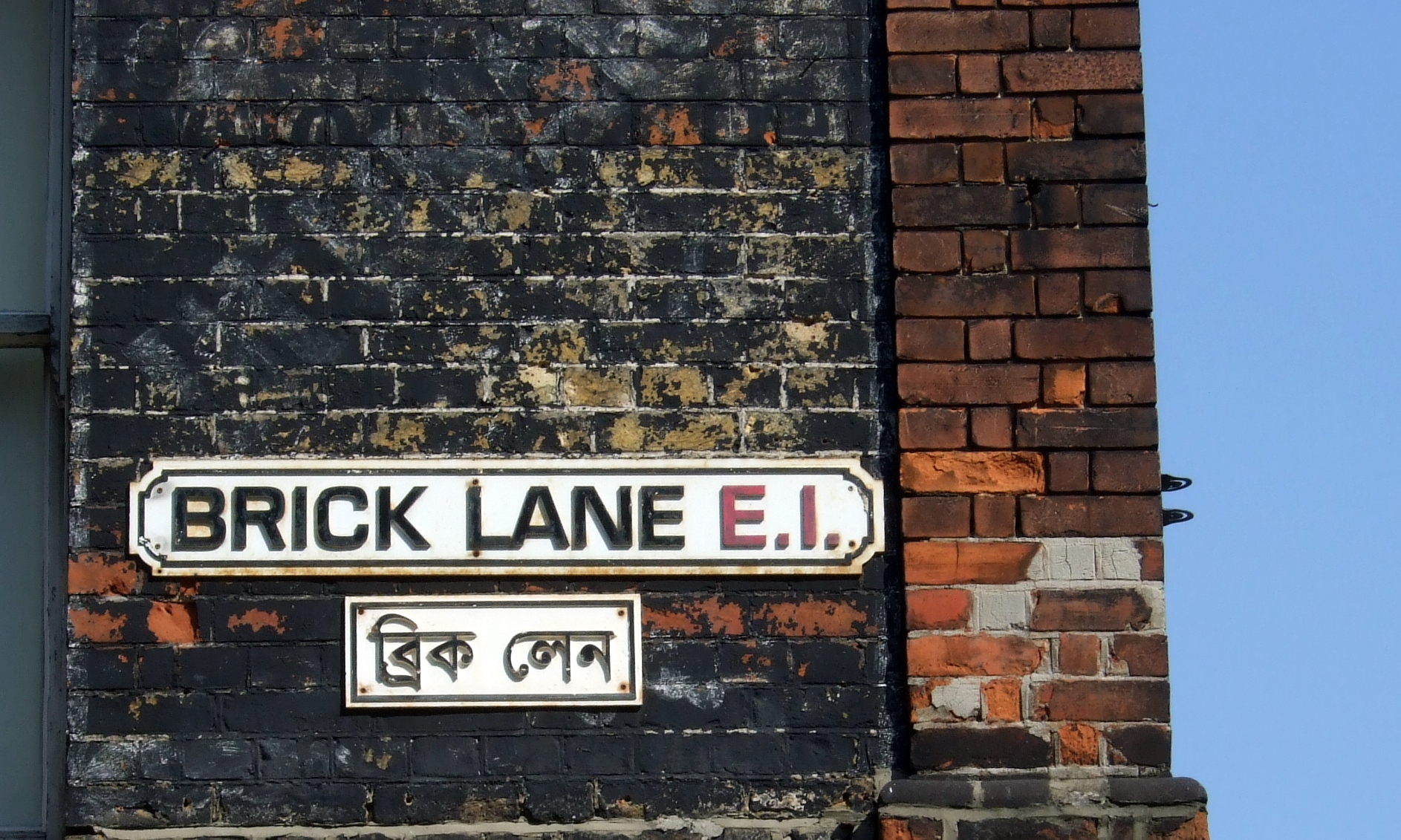
A 'Brick Lane' street sign in English and Bengali, Tower Hamlets, London

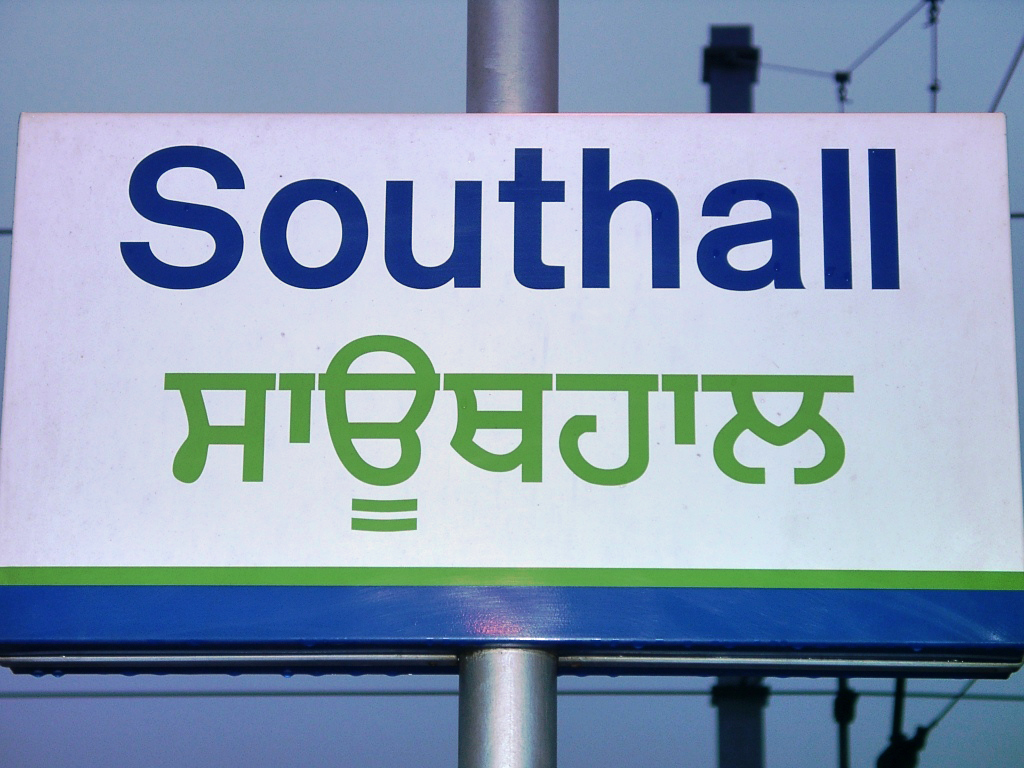
A sign in English and Punjabi at Southall railway station, Southall, London

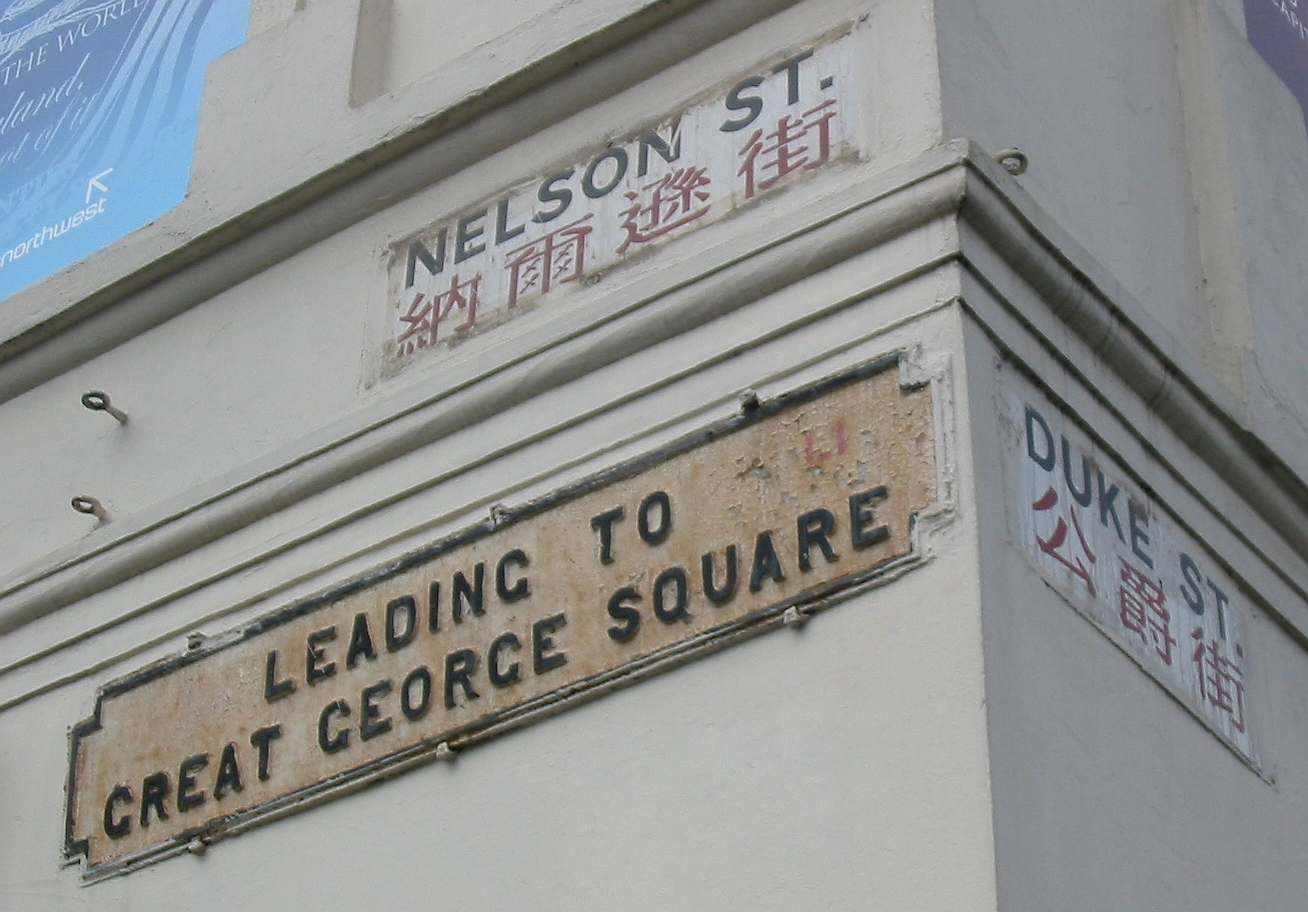
Bilingual street signs in Chinatown, Liverpool, Merseyside

Communities migrating to the UK in recent decades have brought many more languages to the country. Surveys started in 1979 by the Inner London Education Authority discovered over 100 languages being spoken domestically by the families of the inner city's school children. Current school censuses collect information on over 300 language categories. Data on the total number of languages entered onto national census forms in 2021 (England and Wales and Northern Ireland), and 2022 (Scotland) is not yet published. Write in data in 2011 covered over 600 languages and categories.

Many Black Britons speak English as their first language. Their ancestors mostly came from the West Indies, particularly Jamaica, and generally also spoke English-based creole languages. Hence there are significant numbers of Caribbean creole speakers (see below for Ethnologue figures). A large proportion of the Black British population, especially African-born immigrants speak French as a first or second language.

British Asians speak dozens of different languages, and it is difficult to determine how many people speak each language alongside English. The largest subgroup of British Asians are those of Punjabi origin (representing approximately two thirds of direct migrants from South Asia to the UK), from both India and Pakistan. In 1994, they numbered over 2 million in the UK, and are the largest Punjabi community outside of Indian subcontinent.

Among British Pakistanis, Pahari-Pothwari, and particularly Mirpuri, is the most spoken language. Since it is a spoken language lacking a standardised form, Urdu is also used by the community in the media and literature. The Punjabi language movement considers it to be a dialect of Punjabi. There have been efforts by numerous initiatives to document and gain recognition for the language, particularly in wake of the 2021 United Kingdom census. Institutions such as the National Health Service (NHS) have started to provide Pothwari translation services throughout the country.

Predominantly people of Bangladeshi origin in the UK speak Sylheti, which is mostly a spoken language with no standard form, and is also generally considered as a dialect of Bengali. Recent Italian-Bangladeshi migrants to the UK mostly speak standard Bengali, including other dialects. Standard Bengali is used by the community as a whole particularly in media. Sylheti had been enlisted as part of the list of native languages spoken by students in British schools, and some institutions such as the National Health Service (NHS) provide Sylheti translation services.

=== Most common immigrant languages ===
In the 2021 census, English or Welsh was the main language of 91.1% of the residents of England and Wales. Among other languages, the most common were as follows.

1. Polish 611,845 or 1.1% of the population
2. Romanian 471,954 or 0.8%
3. Punjabi 290,745 or 0.5%
4. Urdu 269,849 or 0.5%
5. Portuguese 224,719 or 0.4%
6. Spanish 215,062 or 0.4%
7. Arabic (with Varieties of Arabic) 203,998 or 0.4%
8. Bengali (with Sylheti and Chatgaya) 199,495 or 0.3%
9. Gujarati 188,956 or 0.3%
10. Italian 160,010 or 0.3%
11. Tamil 125,363 or 0.2%
12. French 120,259 or 0.2%
13. Lithuanian 119,656 or 0.2%
14. Chinese 118,271 or 0.2%
15. Turkish 112,978 or 0.2%
16. Bulgarian 111,431 or 0.2%
17. Russian 91,255 or 0.2%
18. Persian 87,713 or 0.2%
19. Hungarian 87,356 or 0.2%
20. Greek 76,675 or 0.1%

== Second or additional languages ==
Throughout the UK, many citizens can speak a second or even a third language from secondary school education, primary school education or from private classes. A 2006 survey found that 23% of the UK population self-reported that they could hold a "basic conversation" in French, 9% in German and 8% in Spanish. In the same survey, 38% of UK citizens reported that they could speak well enough to have a conversation, at least one language other than their mother tongue, 18% at least two languages and 6% at least three languages. 62% of UK citizens cannot speak any second language. These figures include those who describe their level of ability in the second language as "basic".

Language teaching is compulsory in all English schools from the ages of 5 or 7. Modern and ancient languages, such as French, German, Spanish, Latin, Greek, Urdu, Mandarin, Russian, Bengali, Hebrew, and Arabic, are studied. Language teaching is compulsory from the ages of 11 or 12 in Scotland and Wales.

== Law French and Latin ==
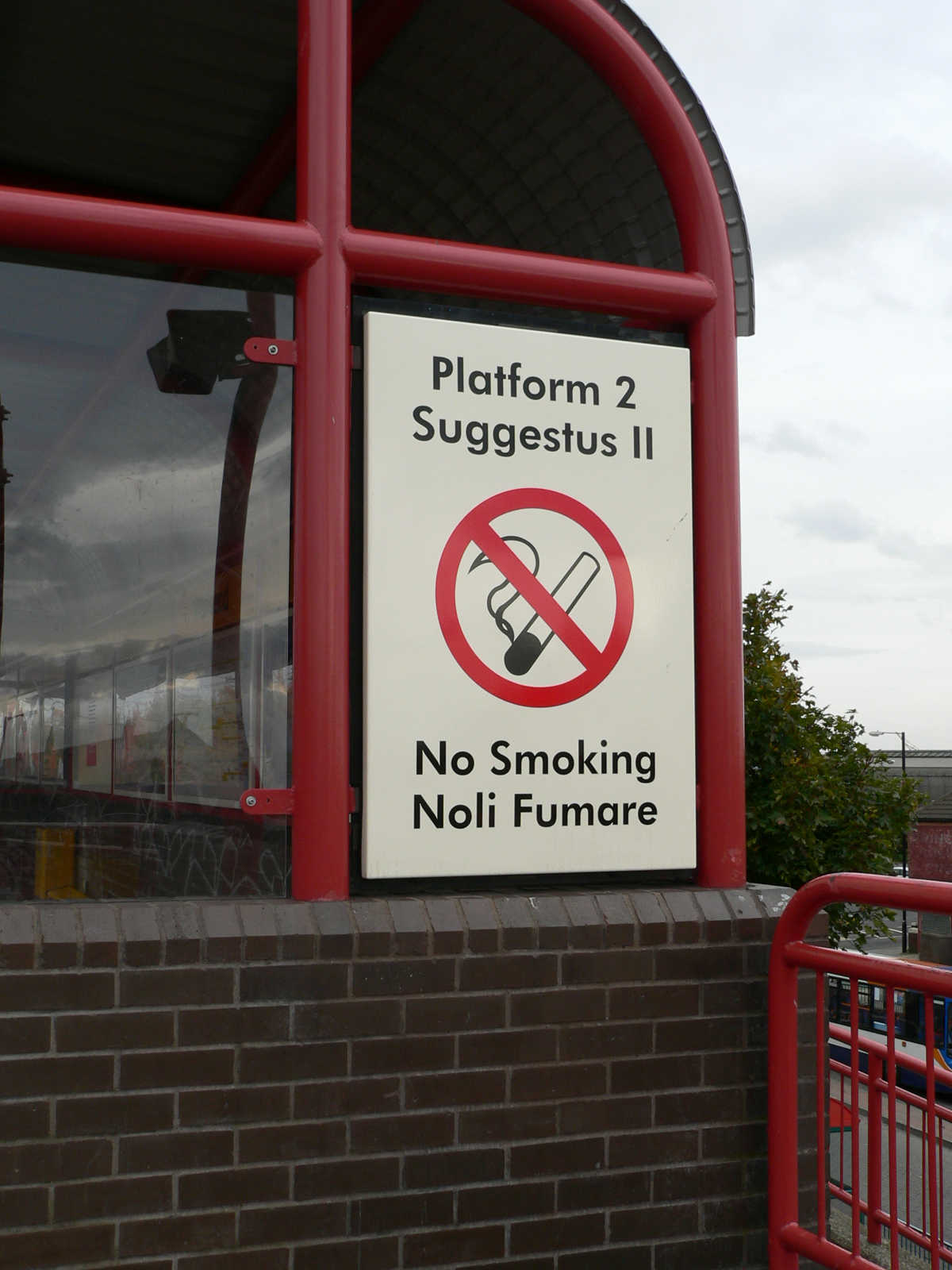
The signs at Wallsend Metro station are in English and Latin as a tribute to Wallsend's role as one of the outposts of the Roman empire.

Law French is still used in the Houses of Parliament for certain official business between the clerks of the House of Commons and the House of Lords, and on other official occasions such as the dissolution of Parliament.

Latin is also used to a limited degree in certain official mottoes, for example Nemo me impune lacessit, legal terminology (habeas corpus), and various ceremonial contexts. Latin abbreviations can also be seen on British coins. The use of Latin has declined greatly in recent years.

The Catholic Church retains Latin in official and quasi-official contexts. Latin remains the language of the Roman Rite, and the Tridentine Mass is celebrated in Latin. Although the Mass of Paul VI is usually celebrated in English, it can be and often is said in Latin, in part or whole, especially at multilingual gatherings. It is the official language of the Holy See, the primary language of its public journal, the Acta Apostolicae Sedis, and the working language of the Roman Rota.

At one time, Latin and Greek were commonly taught in British schools, and were required for entrance to the ancient universities until 1919, for Greek, and the 1960s, for Latin A-Levels and Highers are still available in both subjects.

== Extinct languages ==
=== Cornish ===
Cornish became extinct as a first language in the late 18th century, ceasing to have any fully competent speakers by 1800. Its cultural legacy has continued within Cornwall.

There are small numbers of second-language speakers of revived varieties of Cornish, and these appear in the table of living languages in this article. Many people therefore regard the Cornish language not as "extinct" but as "critically endangered" or by other similar terms.

=== Norn ===
A North Germanic language once spoken in the Shetland Islands, Orkney Islands and Caithness. It is likely that the language was dying out in the late 18th century, with the reports putting the last Norn speakers in the 19th century. Walter Sutherland from Skaw in Unst, who died about 1850, has been cited as the last native speaker of the Norn language. The remote islands of Foula and Unst are variously claimed as the last refuges of the language in Shetland, where there were people "who could repeat sentences in Norn, probably passages from folk songs or poems, as late as 1893". Fragments of vocabulary survived the death of the main language and remain to this day, mainly in place-names and terms referring to plants, animals, weather, mood, and fishing vocabulary.

=== Kentish Sign ===
Unrelated to both Banzsl British Sign Language, Northern Irish SL and Francosign Irish SL, the sign language spoken in Kent was a unique village sign language that fell into disuse and was superseded by BSL in the 17th century. There are weak rumours that Martha's Vineyard Sign Language, (one of ASL's substrate languages) descended through Kentish signers, though proper evidence has not yet been substantiated.

=== Pictish ===
Pictish was probably a Brittonic language, or dialect, spoken by the Picts, the people of northern and central Scotland in the Early Middle Ages, which became extinct c.900 AD. There is virtually no direct attestation of Pictish, short of a limited number of geographical and personal names found on monuments and the contemporary records in the area controlled by the Kingdom of the Picts. Such evidence points to the language being closely related to the Brittonic language spoken prior to Anglo-Saxon settlement in what is now southern Scotland, England and Wales. A minority view held by a few scholars claims that Pictish was at least partially non-Indo-European or that a non-Indo-European and Brittonic language coexisted.

=== Cumbric ===
Cumbric was a variety of the Common Brittonic language spoken during the Early Middle Ages in the Hen Ogledd or "Old North" in what is now Northern England and southern Lowland Scotland. It was closely related to Old Welsh and the other Brittonic languages. Place name evidence suggests Cumbric speakers may have carried it into other parts of northern England as migrants from its core area further north. It may also have been spoken as far south as Pendle and the Yorkshire Dales. Most linguists think that it became extinct in the 12th century, after the incorporation of the semi-independent Kingdom of Strathclyde into the Kingdom of Scotland.

== Scripts ==
Official script	Scheduled languages
English	English, Scots, Ulster Scots, Cornish
Gaelic	Irish, Scottish Gaelic

== See also ==
- British Overseas Territories#Languages
- Literature in the other languages of Britain
- Regional accents of English speakers
- British English
- British literature
- Languages of the European Union
- European languages
- Celtic languages
- History of the Scots language
- Gaelic road signs in Scotland
- Beurla Reagaird
- Polari
- Pidgin English
