= British languages =

The British languages or a British language may refer to either:

- The Languages of the United Kingdom (demonym: British), including Britain
  - British English, a dialect of English
- Brittonic languages, a branch of Insular Celtic languages
  - Common Brittonic, an ancient language once spoken across Britain
  - Welsh language, spoken natively in Wales and the England–Wales border, once called British in English

== See also ==
- Breton language, spoken in Brittany, France.
