= NISL =

NISL may refer to:

- National Indoor Soccer League (2021-)
- National Indoor Soccer League, former name of the Major Indoor Soccer League (2008–2014)
- Northern Ireland Sign Language
