= British Sign Language =

Sign language used in the United Kingdom

British Sign Language (BSL)
- Breetish Sign Leid (Ulster Scots); Iaith Arwyddion Prydain (Welsh); Cànan Soidhnidh Bhreatainn (Scottish Gaelic); Teanga Chomharthaíochta na Breataine (Irish)
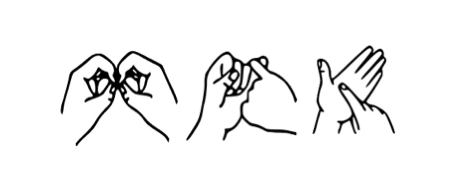
- "BSL" in British Sign Language
- Native to: United Kingdom
- Native speakers: 77,000 (2014); 250,000 L2 speakers (2013)
- Language family: BANZSL: British Sign Language (BSL)
- Writing system: none widely accepted SignWriting

Official status
- Recognised minority language in: England; Scotland; Wales

Language codes
- ISO 639-3: bfi
- Glottolog: brit1235

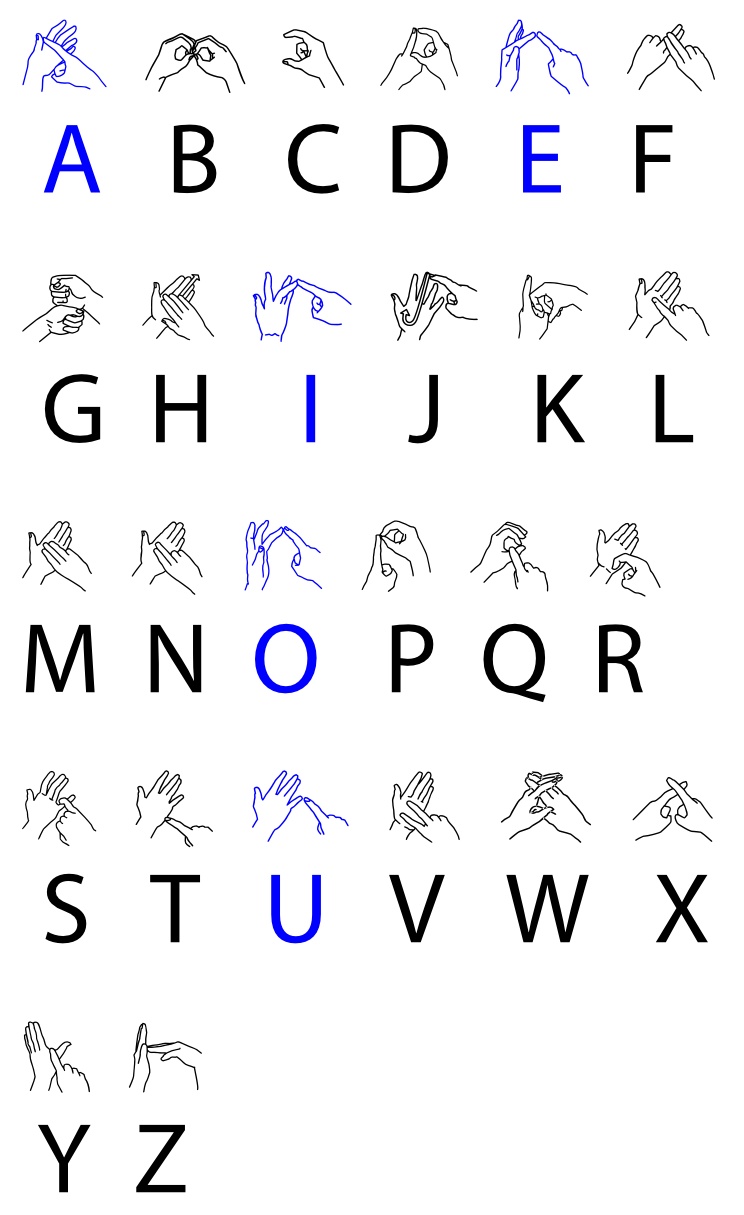
The BSL manual alphabet (right-hand-dominant form shown)

British Sign Language (BSL) is a sign language used in the United Kingdom and is the first or preferred language among the deaf community in the UK. Based on the percentage of people who reported 'using British Sign Language at home' on the 2011 Scottish Census, the British Deaf Association estimates there are 151,000 BSL users in the UK, of whom 87,000 are Deaf. People who are not deaf may also use BSL, as hearing relatives of deaf people, sign language interpreters or as a result of other contact with the British Deaf community. The language makes use of space and involves movement of the hands, body, face and head.

== Usage ==
In 2016 the British Deaf Association (BDA) said that, based on official statistics, it believes there are 151,000 people who use BSL in the UK, and 87,000 of these are deaf. This figure does not include professional BSL users, interpreters, translators, etc. unless they use BSL at home. By contrast, in the 2011 England and Wales Census 15,000 people living in England and Wales reported themselves using BSL as their main language.

In Northern Ireland, there are about 4,500 users of BSL and 1,500 users of Irish Sign Language, an unrelated sign language. A hybrid version, dubbed "Northern Ireland Sign Language", is also used.

== Recognition and status ==
On 18 March 2003 the UK government formally recognised BSL as a language in its own right. In 2022, the British Sign Language Act was passed, which legally recognised BSL as a language of England, Wales and Scotland.

=== In education ===
BSL is used in some educational establishments, but is not always the policy for deaf children in some local authority areas.

==== GCSE (England and Wales) ====
As of January 2026, there is no GCSE qualification in British Sign Language available to students, but one is under development in England and planned for Wales. The Department for Education began to develop the GCSE in 2019, but the process was delayed due to the Covid-19 pandemic. In June 2023, the UK Government launched a consultation for the GCSE, with teaching initially planned to begin in schools from September 2025. In 2024, Qualifications Wales suspended development of its GCSE in BSL, setting a new goal to introduce it to schools in Wales in 2027.

In 2025, Ofqual ran a second consultation to gather feedback on its proposed rules for the qualification in England, releasing the results and its final decisions on the rules in November. GCSE exam boards who want to run the qualification in England must next make detailed offers to Ofqual for accreditation based on these regulations.

=== In visual media ===
Welsh Government daily COVID-19 press conference in November 2020; Welsh and English instantaneous signing

Many British television channels broadcast programmes with in-vision signing, using BSL, as well as specially made programmes aimed mainly at deaf people such as the BBC's See Hear and Channel 4's VEE-TV. There is also a specially dedicated British Sign Language channel, LumoTV (previously BSL Zone), established in 2008.

All BBC channels (excluding BBC One and BBC Alba) provide in-vision signing for some of their programmes. BBC News broadcasts in-vision signing at 08:00–08:30, 13:00–14:00 and 18:00–18:30 GMT/BST every weekday and at 07:00–07:30 on the weekends. BBC Two also broadcasts in-vision signed repeats of the main channel's primetime programmes between 00:00 and 05:00 each weekday and early Saturday mornings. It also provides signing on weekday mornings between 08:00 and 09:00. In 2024, over 10% of Channel 4's programming was signed, including popular shows such as Hollyoaks and Gogglebox.

=== British Sign Language Dictionary ===
Published in 1992, the British Sign Language Dictionary was compiled for the British Deaf Association by the Deaf Studies Research Unit at the University of Durham. The dictionary was edited by David Brien, assisted by a team composed by Mary Brennan, Clark Denmark, Frances Elton, Liz Scott Gibson, Graham Turner and Dorothy Miles, among others. It depicts over 1,800 signs through pictures and diagrams, each sign accompanied by definitions, explanations and usage. The signs are ordered not alphabetically, as a dictionary of the English language, but rather according to the phonological characteristics of the language. For example, signs that are based on the "fist" handshape come before signs based on the "open hand" handshape. The foreword was written by Diana, Princess of Wales, who was the patron of the BDA.

=== BSL Corpus and SignBank ===
The British Sign Language Corpus Project, based at the Deafness Cognition and Language Research Centre (University College London), was funded between 2008 and 2011 to provide a video corpus of BSL in four regions (Bristol, Birmingham, London and Manchester). It was succeeded by the BSL SignBank, which moved the BSL Corpus online between 2011 and 2015. It also draws on the 1992 BSL Dictionary for its vocabulary.

== Dialects ==
BSL has many regional dialects. Certain signs used in Scotland, for example, may not be understood immediately, or not understood at all, by those in Southern England, or vice versa. Some signs are even more local, occurring only in certain towns or cities (such as the Manchester system of number signs). Likewise, some may go in or out of fashion, or evolve over time, just as terms in oral languages do. Families may have signs unique to them to accommodate for certain situations or to describe an object that may otherwise require fingerspelling.

== Classification ==
Although the United Kingdom and the United States share English as the predominant spoken language, British Sign Language is quite distinct from American Sign Language (ASL), having only 31% signs identical, or 44% cognate. BSL is also distinct from Irish Sign Language (ISL), which is more closely related to French Sign Language (LSF) and ASL. BSL is also distinct from Signed English, a manually coded method expressed to represent the English language.

BANZSL family tree

Old British Sign Language (c. 1760–1900)
Maritime SL (c. 1860–present)	Swedish SL family? (c. 1800–present)
Papua NG SL (c. 1990–present)	Fiji Sign Language	Auslan (c. 1860–present)	New Zealand SL (c. 1870–present)	British SL (c. 1900–present)	Northern Ireland SL (c. 1920–present)	South African SL (c. 1860–present)

The sign languages used in Australia and New Zealand, Auslan and New Zealand Sign Language respectively, evolved largely from 19th century BSL, and all retain the same manual alphabet and grammar and possess similar lexicons.

The sign language used in Sri Lanka is also closely related to BSL despite the oral language not being English, demonstrating variation in distance between sign languages and spoken ones.

While private correspondence from William Stokoe hinted at a formal name for the language in 1960, the first usage of the term "British Sign Language" in an academic publication was likely by Aaron Cicourel.

== History ==
=== Early sign language ===
The earliest known document describing the use of signing in a legal context is dated to c. 1324 and mentions John de Orleton, a deaf man assigning his property to a family member. Published in 1450, the History of the Syon Monastery at Lisbon and Brentford, contains descriptions of signs—some of which are still in use. The earliest evidence of signing in registry records is from a marriage ceremony between a deaf man, Thomas Tilsye and Ursula Russel on 6 February 1576 at St Martin's Church, now Leicester Cathedral. The document recorded that "the sayde Thomas, for the expression of his minde instead of words, of his own accorde used these signs…First he embraced her with his armes, and took her by the hande, putt a ring upon her finger and layde his hande upon her harte, and held his hands towards heaven; and to show his continuance to dwell with her to his lyves ende he did it by closing of his eyes with his hands and digging out of the earthe with his foote, and pulling as though he would ring a bell with divers other signs approved".

Richard Carew's Survey of Cornwall (1602) includes a description of Edward Bone, a deaf servant, meeting his deaf friend John Kempe. Bone had some knowledge of Cornish and was able to lipread, but appeared to prefer signing. Carew described the situation thus:

Somewhat neerre the place of his [Bone's] birth, there dwelt another, so affected, or rather defected, whose name was Kempe: which two, when they chaunced to meete, would use such kinde embracements, such strange, often, and earnest tokenings, and such heartie laughtes, and other passionate gestures, that their want of a tongue, seemed rather a hindrance to other conceiving [understanding] them, then to their conceiving one another.

John Bulwer, who had an adopted deaf daughter Chirothea Johnson, authored four late-Renaissance texts related to deafness, sign language and the human body: Chirologia; or, The Natural Language of the Hand (1644), Philocopus; or, The Deaf and Dumb Man’s Friend (1648), Pathomyotamia (1649) and Anthropometamorphosis (1650). In particular, Chirologia focuses on the meanings of gestures, expressions and body language, and describes signs and gestures in use at the time, some of which resemble signs still in use, while Philocopus explores the use of lipreading by deaf people and the possibility of deaf education.

Another writer of the same time, George Dalgarno, recognised that sign language was unrelated to English. In 1661 he wrote that "The deaf man has no teacher at all and through necessity may put him upon... using signs, yet those have no affinity to the language by which they that are about him do converse among themselves." In November 1666, diarist Samuel Pepys described a conversation between George Downing and a deaf boy named Oliver who used "strange signs", which may have been in Old Kentish sign language.

British Sign Language has evolved, as all languages do, from these origins by modification, invention and importation.

=== 18th and 19th century ===
==== Early deaf education and the Braidwood Academy ====
Thomas Braidwood, a teacher from Edinburgh, founded 'Braidwood's Academy for the Deaf and Dumb' in 1760, which is believed to be the first school for deaf children in Britain. The school primarily taught oral communication, however there is evidence of 'deaf signing' being used as a teaching method (albeit probably following the structure of English). This combined system came to be known as the English method—a sort of midway point between French manualist and German oralist systems, and was the first codification of what would later develop into British Sign Language.

Joseph Watson was trained as a teacher of the deaf under Thomas Braidwood. He eventually left in 1792 to become the headmaster of the Asylum for the Deaf and Dumb in Bermondsey where he advocated for 'natural signing'—likely referring to the way deaf children naturally sign, as opposed to following English structure. This 'natural signing' is thought to be the precursor to modern BSL.

The use of sign names is mentioned in the memoirs of one pupil who attended Braidwood Academy from 1814 to 1820, describing them thus:

Every pupil of the school had a fixed sign, instead of his own name, by which he became known. His sign took its rise from some peculiarity in his person or countenance [...] No sign which might refer to something disagreeable in the person or character of any pupil, was, however, allowed to stand.

In 1815 when Thomas Gallaudet visited England, the Braidwood school refused to teach him their methods unless he paid them. So instead, Gallaudet found himself in Paris, having been invited there by the much more accommodating Abbé Sicard. Gallaudet would eventually take much of what he had learnt in France, back to the United States. As a consequence American Sign Language (ASL) today has a 60% similarity to modern French Sign Language and is almost unintelligible to users of British Sign Language.

By the mid 1800s, sign was the most prominent mode of communication within deaf schools in Britain, and by 1870, there were 22 (often residential) schools found in most major cities around the country.

==== The Milan Conference and later deaf education ====
The Second International Congress on Education of the Deaf, also known as the Milan Conference, was held in 1880, and proscribed the use of sign language in education; for the best part of a century, sign language was no longer used in the education of deaf children.

Signing was actively discouraged in schools by punishment, and deaf education emphasised teaching deaf children to learn to lip read and finger spell, due to the prevailing belief across Europe established that signing was bad. Since there was no (or very little) exchange of sign language within educational establishments, signing was preserved through deaf clubs or within families.

=== 20th century ===
Until the 1940s, sign language skills were passed between deaf people without a unified sign language system and many deaf people lived in residential institutions.

In 1978, the government-issued Warnock Report advocated for the mainstreaming of deaf children which led to the closure of many deaf schools. During this time, the Total Communication method was popularised.

From the 1970s there has been an increasing tolerance for the language, in part due to its recognition as a natural language by linguists.

In the 1980s, BSL started to be used as language of instruction in schools again, alongside English. This decade saw the start of deaf programming on British television. Deaf scholar and activist Paddy Ladd is credited with getting sign language on television and enabling deaf children to be educated in sign.

BSL users campaigned to have BSL recognised on an official level. Police and Criminal Evidence Act 1984 mandates the provision of interpreters.

In 1999, the Federation of Deaf People (FDP) led a 4000-strong march in London to demand the recognition of BSL as a language. This can be considered to mark the first political march by the modern 'British Deaf Community', as an established community.

=== 21st century ===
==== Let Sign Shine ====
Let Sign Shine is a campaign started by Norfolk teenager Jade Chapman, whose sister is deaf, to raise awareness of BSL and to petition for BSL to be taught in schools. The campaign's petition to Parliament attracted support from over four thousand people. Chapman won awards for her work including the education award category at the Bernard Matthews Youth Award 2014 for her work in raising awareness of the importance of sign language.

Having been donated £1,000 from the Bernard Matthews Youth Award, Let Sign Shine used this to start a British Sign Language course at Dereham Neatherd High School.

==== Official language recognition ====
In 2021, MP Rosie Cooper (a CODA) introduced the British Sign Language Bill to recognise BSL, this time as an official language (not merely its existence as had been done in 2003), which was backed by the government. After being dormant from June 2021, the bill began moving through Parliament on 28 January 2022, but during a meeting with stakeholders on 7 February, the language of the bill was revealed to have been pared down substantially, disappointing said stakeholders. The British Deaf Association stated that it was 'unhappy' with this removal of language from the bill. The British Sign Language Act received royal assent on 28th April 2022.

== Linguistics ==
Linguistics is the study of language, including those like BSL that are not carried by sound. In all sign languages the great majority of 'words' (hand gestures) cannot be understood in other sign languages. How one language signs a certain number would be different from how another language signs it. The way sentences are constructed (syntax) differs from sign language to sign language, just as with different spoken languages. British Sign Language is described as a 'spatial language' as it "moves signs in space".

=== Phonology ===
Like many other sign languages, BSL phonology is defined by elements such as handshape, orientation, location, movement, and non-manual features. There are phonological components to sign language that have no meaning alone but work together to create a meaning of a signed word: hand shape, movement, location, orientation and facial expression. The meanings of words differ if one of these components is changed. Signs can be identical in certain components but different in others, giving each a different meaning. Facial expression falls under the nonmanual feature component of phonology. These include "eyebrow height, eye gaze, mouthing, head movement, and torso rotation."

=== Grammar ===
In common with other languages, whether spoken or signed, BSL has its own grammar which govern how phrases are signed. BSL has a particular syntax. One important component of BSL is its use of proforms. A proform is "...any form that stands in the place of, or does the job of, some other form." Sentences are composed of two parts, in order: the subject and the predicate. The subject is the topic of the sentence, while the predicate is the commentary about the subject. Question words are generally at the end of a sentence.

BSL uses a topic–comment structure. Topic-comment means that the topic of the signed conversation is first established, followed by an elaboration of the topic, being the 'comment' component. The canonical word order outside of the topic–comment structure is object–subject–verb (OSV), and noun phrases are head-initial.

=== Evolution ===
The language continues to evolve as older signs such as alms and pawnbroker have fallen out of use and new signs such as internet and laser have been coined. The evolution of the language and its changing level of acceptance meant that older users tend to use more finger spelling while younger ones make use of a wider range of signs.

In 2019, over 100 signs for scientific terms, including 'deoxyribonucleotide' and 'deoxyribonucleoside', were added to BSL, after being conceived by Liam Mcmulkin, a deaf graduate of the University of Dundee, who had found finger-spelling such words tiresome, during his degree course. Similarly, architects Chris Laing and Adolfs Kristapsons developed a project called SignStrokes which developed new signs for the built environment, having not wanted to continuously make new signs for different architectural concepts.

== Learning British Sign Language ==
British Sign Language can be learnt from formal institutions throughout the UK and three examination systems exist. Courses are provided by community colleges, local centres for deaf people and private organisations.

A teaching qualification programme was started by the British Deaf Association in 1984 at the University of Durham, called BSL Tutor Training Course, which closed in 1999.

National awarding organisations run training for BSL teachers. Each of these organisations has its own curriculum, teaching materials and resources.

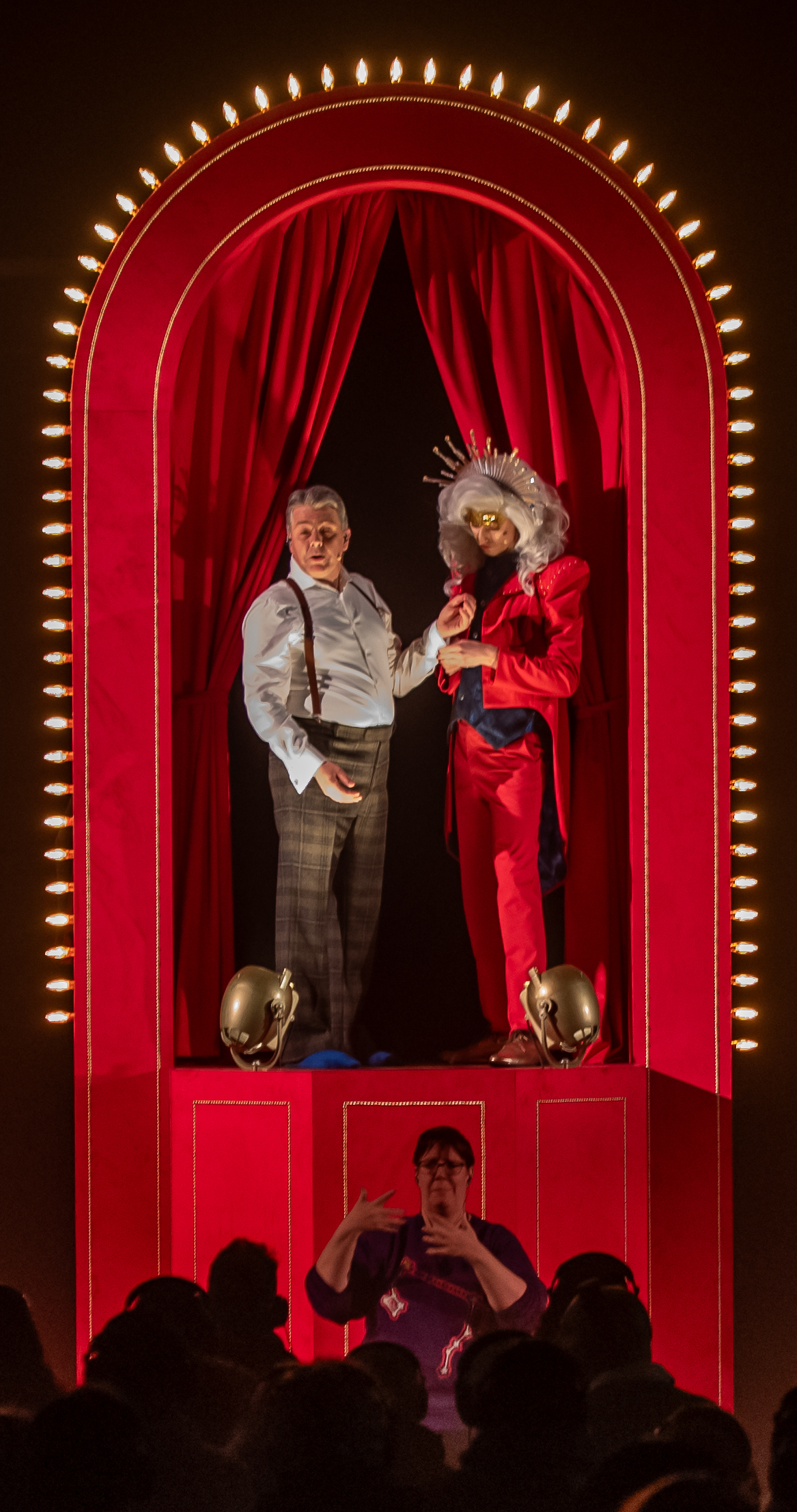
BSL interpreter below performers during The Gifting performance, LEEDS 2023

=== Becoming a BSL / English interpreter ===
There are two qualification routes: via post-graduate studies, or via National Vocational Qualifications. Deaf studies undergraduate courses with specific streams for sign language interpreting exist at several British universities; post-graduate level interpreting diplomas are also on offer from universities and one private company. Course entry requirements vary from no previous knowledge of BSL to NVQ level 6 BSL (or equivalent).

The qualification process allows interpreters to register with the National Registers of Communication Professionals with Deaf and Deafblind People (NRCPD), a voluntary regulator. Registrants are asked to self-certify that they have both cleared a DBS (Disclosure and Barring Service) check and are covered by professional indemnity insurance. Completing a level 3 BSL language assessment and enrolling on an approved interpreting course allows applications to register as a TSLI (Trainee Sign Language Interpreter). After completing an approved interpreting course, trainees can then apply to achieve RSLI (Registered Sign Language Interpreter) status. RSLIs are currently required by NRCPD to log Continuous Professional Development activities. Post-qualification, specialist training is still considered necessary to work in specific critical domains.

=== Communication support workers ===
Communication support workers (CSWs) are professionals who support the communication of deaf students in education at all ages, and deaf people in many areas of work, using British Sign Language and other communication methods such as Sign Supported English. The qualifications and experience of CSWs vary: some are fully qualified interpreters, others are not.

=== BSL apps ===
There are currently two BSL language learning apps and web platforms: Bright BSL and Lingvano.

== See also ==
- Languages in the United Kingdom
- Makaton
- Inspirisles
