= Trevor Johnston =

Australian linguist

Trevor Johnston FAHA is an Australian expert on Auslan.

Johnston received his PhD from the University of Sydney in 1989 for his work on Auslan. Johnston was responsible for coining the term Auslan, and created the first Auslan dictionary, which was also one of the first sign language dictionaries that sequenced signs throughout according to principles that were language internal - such as handshape.

While Johnston's research focuses on sign languages, his interests within this area are broad. They include both public and academic contributions towards sign language documentation and description, sociolinguistic variation, language change, language policy and professional development for teachers of the deaf and teachers of sign languages. Johnston has made an important contribution to developments in the emerging field of corpus linguistics of sign languages.

Johnston is a native Auslan user, having grown up with deaf signing parents and an extensive network of deaf relatives on both sides of his family.

Johnston was elected a Fellow of the Australian Academy of the Humanities in 2010.

== Key Publications ==
(2008) Johnston, T. Corpus of grammar and discourse strategies of deaf native users of Auslan (Australian Sign Language), Endangered Languages Archive, SOAS, University of London. http://elar.soas.ac.uk/node/3. Public access from 2012.

(2007) Johnston, T., & A. Schembri. Auslan (Australian Sign Language): An Introduction to Sign Language Linguistics. Cambridge: Cambridge University Press.

(2003) Johnston, T., & A. Schembri (eds). The Survival Guide to Auslan: a beginner's pocket dictionary of Australian Sign Language. Sydney: North Rocks Press.

(1989) Johnston, T. Auslan: The sign language of the Australian deaf community. Unpublished doctoral dissertation, University of Sydney, Sydney.
