= Papua New Guinean Sign Language =

Official language of Papua New Guinea

- PNGSL
- Native to: Papua New Guinea
- Native speakers: 30,000 (2015)
- Language family: indigenous–Auslan creole: Papua New Guinean Sign Language

Official status
- Official language in: Papua New Guinea

Language codes
- ISO 639-3: pgz
- Glottolog: papu1255

Papua New Guinean Sign Language (PNGSL) is a sign language originating from Papua New Guinea. The standardised form of PNGSL was made an official language of Papua New Guinea in 2015.

The language has been called "Melanesian Sign Language". However, this does not translate what the community calls it, and is misleading because it is not used elsewhere in Melanesia.

== Location ==
It is unknown to what extent and where PNGSL is used in Papua New Guinea. However, tests so far have found that speakers from different areas of PNG have been able to communicate with each other, though there is great regional variation due to the influence of home sign. Many children learning PNGSL were raised by hearing parents using home sign, and these children have markedly influenced the language at deaf gatherings.

== History ==
BANZSL family tree

Old British Sign Language (c. 1760–1900)
Maritime SL (c. 1860–present)	Swedish SL family? (c. 1800–present)
Papua NG SL (c. 1990–present)	Fiji Sign Language	Auslan (c. 1860–present)	New Zealand SL (c. 1870–present)	British SL (c. 1900–present)	Northern Ireland SL (c. 1920–present)	South African SL (c. 1860–present)

Auslan (Australian Sign Language) was introduced to Papua New Guinea in the 1990s. There was influence from Tok Pisin and more importantly mixture with local or home sign, as the languages diverged to the point where, by 2015, it was estimated that they were only about 50% mutually intelligible and that native speakers of Auslan and PNGSL were not able to understand one another.

By the time sign language was made official, PNGSL was being used as the language of instruction in deaf schools and deaf units within hearing schools. Books purported to be of PNGSL up to this point were actually of Auslan. The first book of actual PNGSL is expected to be published in 2016.

Separate, local sign languages have been described in Enga and Chimbu provinces.

== Relevant academic literature ==
- Kendon, A. (2020). Sign Language in Papua New Guinea. A Primary Sign Language from the Upper Lagaip Valley, Enga Province. Amsterdam/Philadelphia: John Benjamins Publishing Company
