= Inspirisles =

2021 tabletop role-playing game

- Designers: Richard Oxenham
- Publication: 2021
- Genres: Tabletop role-playing game

Inspirisles and its sequel Overisles are tabletop role-playing games by Richard Oxenham that teach basics of American Sign Language and British Sign Language while players cast spells and solve puzzles. The settings are based on Celtic mythology and Arthurian legend. Inspirisles was published in 2021 after raising £31,501 on Kickstarter and the sequel, Overisles, was published in 2023 after raising £183,621.
