= Australian deaf community =

The deaf community in Australia is a diverse cultural and linguistic minority group. Deaf communities have many distinctive cultural characteristics, some of which are shared across many countries. These characteristics include language, values and behaviours. The Australian deaf community relies primarily on Australian Sign Language, or Auslan. Those in the Australian deaf community experience some parts of life differently than those in the broader hearing world, such as access to education and health care.

== Australian Sign Language ==
Australian Sign Language, also known as Auslan, is the primary signed language for deaf Australians. It is hard to tell how many signing deaf people are in Australia as much information is unavailable, and what information is available is largely out of date.

Auslan is the native languages of a few deaf signers in Australia, although it is the preferred language. It's common for deaf Australians to not learn Auslan until they are in school with other deaf children. In some cases, they do not learn it or pick it up until adulthood because they did not go to a specialized school for the deaf where there would be more people to learn from or practice with.

Signers in Australia use a combination of Auslan and natural sign language, signed English and contact signing to communicate best between each other, including with hearing people. Not all deaf signers are especially proficient in English, and English and Australian Sign Language are not interchangeable and are, in fact, entirely separate languages although they have influenced one another. Those who know Auslan and English would be considered bilingual. Although some schools for the deaf teach using Auslan, English is the written language.

Auslan shows up in many ways through different dialects or accents, and the way someone may sign Auslan can be affected by several external factors such as region, religion, age and school.

== Community ==
People of the Australian deaf community are usually someone who acquired deafness or significant hearing impairments in childhood and can sign in Auslan. Those who acquired deafness or hearing differences in adulthood likely have a good understanding of spoken language, namely English, and may be able to read lips or communicate with most people relatively easily. The number of deaf people in Australia may be configured using data from hearing tests done at birth, although this does not guarantee that said persons know how to sign Auslan.

Being a part of the Australian deaf community may include a robust social life with other deaf people, although deaf people are a part of the larger hearing world as well. Signing is used in schools, clubs, and organizations directly between members or through interpreters.

== Education ==
Deaf children are typically not born from deaf parents, and therefore likely do not learn much signing from their parents at the time that is critical for language development. They likely pick it up when they enter school, assuming that said school has other deaf children or teaches Auslan. More often, schools do not teach Auslan unless it is a specialized school for deaf children depending on the mode of teaching used. Even so, teachers of Auslan may have learned slightly outdated Auslan which may affect the quality of education of Deaf students who rely on signing.

Bilingual programs are available to deaf students in Australia. While bilingual models of teaching exist, they are relatively recent. Deaf children often learned or currently learn Auslan or another form of signed language during social events like recess. Currently, it is often that students in mainstream schooling are taken out of classrooms and taught one-on-one, which may impede their socialization with other students. Interpreters are not always available, and the quality of the sign language in the classroom varies.

== Medicine ==
Health care related to hearing impairments in Australia includes hearing devices like hearing aids and cochlear implants. Implantation of cochlear implants for deaf children is relatively high in Australia compared to the rest of the world, and around 80% of significantly deaf or hard of hearing children receive one. Many in deaf communities, including the Australian deaf community, object to the push for cochlear implants to solve or cure deafness since, to some, deafness is a cultural trait and not something to be fixed, and the reliance on spoken language can hinder a deaf child's ability to acquire a language proficiently.

There are notable shortages of Auslan interpreters trained to give medical information in the sign language. There are also some places in Australia where accommodations for deaf patients, such as appointment booking with text or email; and limitations such as additional fees for interpreters or longer appointments, and additional patient responsibilities like providing one's own interpreter.
