= BANZSL =

Sign language family

- Geographic distribution: Great Britain, Northern Ireland, South Africa, Newfoundland and Labrador, Maritimes, Australia and New Zealand
- Linguistic classification: One of the world's primary sign language families
- Subdivisions: British Sign; Auslan; New Zealand Sign; South African Sign; Maritime Sign; Northern Ireland Sign; PNG Sign; ?Swedish Sign

Language codes
- Glottolog: bsli1234
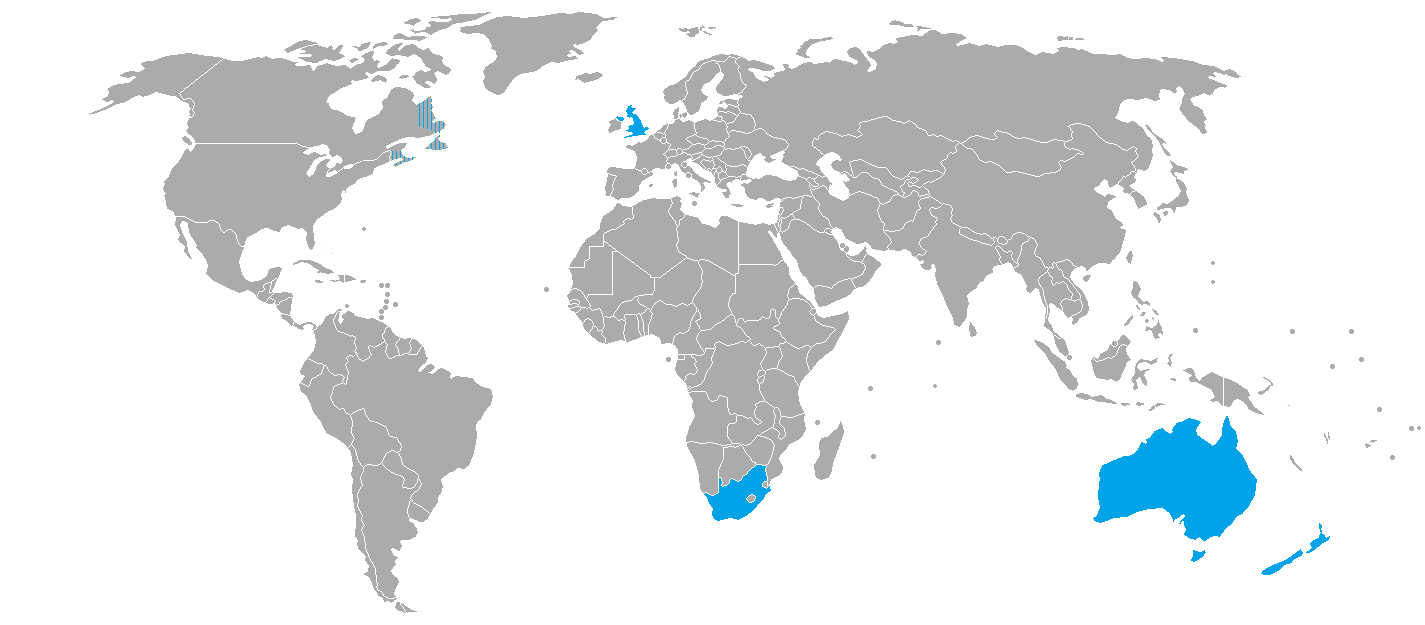
- Areas where BANZSL languages are signed Areas where a BANZSL language is fading from use

British, Australian and New Zealand Sign Language (BANZSL, /ˈbænzəl/), or the British Sign Language (BSL) family, is a language family or grouping encompassing three related sign languages: British Sign Language, Auslan and New Zealand Sign Language (NZSL). The term BANZSL was coined informally by the linguists Trevor Johnston and Adam Schembri in the early 2000s. However, in 2024, Schembri remarked that the Wikipedia article on BANZSL had begun describing it with the more specific or authoritative meaning of "the language from which modern BSL and Auslan and New Zealand sign language have descended", a meaning that "took on a life of its own—something that we didn't intend". As a result, Schembri says he and Johnston have disowned the term due to pushback from Deaf communities, who were concerned that it was replacing the names of each of the three languages.

BSL, Auslan and NZSL all have their roots in a Deaf sign language used in Britain during the 19th century. The three languages in question are related in their use of similar grammar, manual alphabet, and high degree of lexical (sign) overlap.

American Sign Language and the BANZSL varieties are not part of the same language family. However, there is still significant overlap in vocabulary, probably due largely to relatively recent borrowing of lexicon by signers of all three BANZSL varieties, with many younger signers unaware which signs are recent imports.

Between Auslan, BSL and NZSL, 82% of signs are identical (per Swadesh lists). When considering identical as well as similar or related signs there are 98% cognate signs between the languages. By comparison, ASL and BANZSL have only 31% signs identical, or 44% cognate. Further information will be available after completion of the BSL corpus, allows for comparison with the Auslan corpus, and the New Zealand Sign Language project.

There continues to be language contact between BSL, Auslan and NZSL through migration (deaf people and interpreters), the media (television programmes such as See Hear, Switch, Rush and SignPost are often recorded and shared informally in all three countries) and conferences (in 1999 many deaf British people travelled to Australia for the World Federation of the Deaf Conference, WFD, in Brisbane).

According to Henri Wittmann (1991), Swedish Sign Language also descends from BSL. From Swedish SL arose Portuguese Sign Language and Finnish Sign Language, the latter with local admixture; Danish Sign Language is largely mutually intelligible with Swedish SL, though Wittmann places it in the French Sign Language family.

Anderson (1979) instead suggested that Swedish Sign, German Sign and British Sign share one origin in a "North-West European" sign language.

== Languages ==
- BSL (sign attested from 1644 may not be BSL), with approximately 151,000 users
  - Auslan (1860. ASL and ISL influences), with approximately 10 000 users
    - Papua New Guinea Sign Language (c. 1990), which is a creole formed with Auslan, used by 30,000 people
    - Fiji Sign Language, an indigenous base with a large amount of Auslan vocabulary
  - New Zealand SL (1800s), used by approximately 20,000 people
  - Northern Ireland SL (19th century - with American Sign Language and Irish Sign Language influences)
  - South African SL (somewhere between 1846 & 1881), used by perhaps 235,000 people
  - Maritime SL (c. 1860), with perhaps 100 extant users
  - ? Swedish Sign Language family (1800)
    - Swedish Sign Language (1800)
    - Finnish SL (1850s, with local admixture)
    - Finland-Swedish SL (1850s, a middle form between Finnish and Swedish SL)
    - Eritrean Sign (1955, with much local admixture)
    - Portuguese SL (1823)
    - Cape Verdian Sign (1990s, with local admixture)

BANZSL family tree

Old British Sign Language (c. 1760–1900)
Maritime SL (c. 1860–present)	Swedish SL family? (c. 1800–present)
Papua NG SL (c. 1990–present)	Fiji Sign Language	Auslan (c. 1860–present)	New Zealand SL (c. 1870–present)	British SL (c. 1900–present)	Northern Ireland SL (c. 1920–present)	South African SL (c. 1860–present)

== See also ==
- Old French Sign Language – a contemporary of BANZSL
- French Sign Language family
