= New Zealand Sign Language =

- NZSL
- te reo Rotarota o Aotearoa te reo Turi o Aotearoa
- Native to: New Zealand
- Native speakers: 23,000 (2018 census)
- Language family: BANZSL: New Zealand Sign Language

Official status
- Official language in: New Zealand

Language codes
- ISO 639-3: nzs
- Glottolog: newz1236

People who can use New Zealand Sign Language

New Zealand Sign Language or NZSL (Māori: te reo Rotarota o Aotearoa; also known as te reo Turi o Aotearoa, literally "Deaf language of New Zealand") is the main language of the deaf community in New Zealand. It became an official language of New Zealand in April 2006 under the New Zealand Sign Language Act 2006. The purpose of the act was to create rights and obligations in the use of NZSL throughout the legal system and to ensure that the Deaf community had the same access to government information and services as everybody else. According to the 2013 Census, over 20,000 New Zealanders know NZSL.

New Zealand Sign Language has its roots in British Sign Language (BSL), and may be technically considered a dialect of British, Australian and New Zealand Sign Language (BANZSL). There are 62.5% similarities found in British Sign Language and NZSL, compared with 33% of NZSL signs found in American Sign Language.

Like other natural sign languages, it was devised by and for deaf people, with no linguistic connection to a spoken or written language.

NZSL uses the same two-handed manual alphabet as BSL (British Sign Language) and Auslan (Australian Sign Language).

It uses more lip-patterns in conjunction with hand and facial movement to cue signs than BSL, reflecting New Zealand's history of oralist education of deaf people. Its vocabulary includes Māori concepts such as marae and tangi, and signs for New Zealand placenames (e.g., Rotorua – mudpools,, Wellington – W shaken by wind, and Christchurch – 2 Cs.)

== History ==
BANZSL family tree

Old British Sign Language (c. 1760–1900)
Maritime SL (c. 1860–present)	Swedish SL family? (c. 1800–present)
Papua NG SL (c. 1990–present)	Fiji Sign Language	Auslan (c. 1860–present)	New Zealand SL (c. 1870–present)	British SL (c. 1900–present)	Northern Ireland SL (c. 1920–present)	South African SL (c. 1860–present)

The early British immigrants to New Zealand who were deaf brought British Sign Language with them. The first known teacher of sign language was Dorcas Mitchell, who taught the children of one family in Charteris Bay, Lyttelton Harbour, from 1868 to 1877. By 1877 she had taught 42 pupils.

When the first school for the deaf (then called the Sumner Deaf and Dumb Institution) was opened at Sumner, south east of Christchurch in 1878, Mitchell applied unsuccessfully for the position of principal. Instead it went to Gerrit Van Asch, who agreed with the Milan congress of deaf educators of 1880 (to which no deaf people were invited) that teaching should be oral only, and that sign language should be forbidden. (He would not even admit pupils who could sign, so only 14 were admitted.) This was the policy of the school until 1979. A documentary film about the school made in the 1950s makes no mention of sign language. Similar policies were maintained at the schools at Titirangi and Kelston that opened in 1940 and 1958.

Unsurprisingly, the children used sign language secretly and after leaving school, developing NZSL out of British Sign Language largely without adult intervention for over 100 years. The main haven for NZSL was the Deaf Clubs in the main centres. In 1979, "Total Communication" (a "use anything that works" philosophy) was adopted at the Sumner School, but the signing it used was "Australasian Sign Language" an artificial signed form of English. As a result, younger signers use a number of Australasian signs in their NZSL, to such an extent that some call traditional NZSL "Old Sign". NZSL was adopted for teaching in 1994.

In 1985, Marianne Ahlgren proved in her PhD thesis at Victoria University of Wellington that NZSL is a fully-fledged language, with a large vocabulary of signs and a consistent grammar of space.

The New Zealand Sign Language Teachers Association (NZSLTA – formerly known as the New Zealand Sign Language Tutors Association) was set up in 1992. Over the next few years adult education classes in NZSL began in several centres. In 1997 a Certificate in Deaf Studies programme was started at Victoria University of Wellington, with instruction actually in NZSL, designed to teach deaf people how to competently teach NZSL to the wider public. Also in 1992 an interpreter training programme was established at the Auckland Institute of Technology, now known as Auckland University of Technology. This programme was first directed and taught by Dr Rachel Locker McKee (hearing) and Dr David McKee (deaf) and came about due to lobbying by the New Zealand Deaf Community and others who recognised the need for safer and more professional interpreting services. They had as early as 1984 sought support for more research to determine the need for sign language interpreters. Other than a one-off course run in 1985, this was the first time a professional training programme with a qualification was offered in New Zealand. Many of those who have gone on to work as professional NZSL interpreters began their journey in NZSL community classes taught by members of the NZSLTA.

An important step toward the recognition of NZSL was the publication in 1998 of a comprehensive NZSL dictionary by Victoria University of Wellington and the Deaf Association of NZ. It contains some 4000 signs (which correspond to many more meanings than the same number of English words, because of the way signs can be modulated in space and time), sorted by handshape, not English meaning, and coded in the Hamburg Notational System, HamNoSys, as well as pictorially. In 2011, Victoria University launched an Online Dictionary of New Zealand Sign Language based on the original 1998 work, which includes video clips of each sign with examples and the ability to search for signs based on features of the sign (handshape, location, etc.) as well as the sign's English gloss.

For some years, TVNZ broadcast a weekly news programme, "News Review", interpreted in NZSL. This was discontinued in 1993 after a joint survey of deaf and hearing-impaired people found a majority favoured captioned programmes. Many Deaf people felt they had been misled by the survey. There has been no regular programming in NZSL since.

Between August 2012 to August 2013 the Human Rights Commission carried out an inquiry into the use and promotion of New Zealand Sign Language (NZSL). The inquiry has focused on working with key government agencies and the Deaf community around the inquiry's three terms of reference 1) The right to education for deaf people and potential users of NZSL. 2) The rights of deaf people, and other potential users of NZSL, to access communication, information and services, and the right to freedom of expression and opinion, through the provision of professional NZSL interpreter services and other NZSL services and resources. 3) The promotion and maintenance of NZSL as an official language of New Zealand. The full report of the inquiry, A New Era in the Right to Sign, was launched in Parliament by the Minister for Disability Issues, Tariana Turia, on 3 September 2013.

== Official language status ==
NZSL became the third official language of New Zealand on 11 April 2006, joining English and Māori. The parliamentary bill to approve this passed its third reading on 6 April 2006. At the first reading in Parliament, on 22 June 2004, the bill was supported by all political parties. It was referred to the Justice and Electoral Committee, which reported back to the House on 18 July 2005. The second reading passed by 119 to 2 on 23 February 2006 with only the ACT party opposing, because the government was not providing funding for NZSL. It passed the third reading on 6 April 2006 by the same margin. The bill received Royal assent on 10 April 2006 and became law the following day.

The use of NZSL as a valid medium of instruction has not always been accepted by the government, the Association of Teachers of the Deaf, nor by many parents. However, in light of much research into its validity as a language and much advocacy by deaf adults, parents of deaf children (both hearing and deaf) and educationalists, NZSL has since become — in tandem with English — part of the bilingual/bicultural approach used in public schools (including Kelston Deaf Education Centre and Van Asch Deaf Education Centre) since 1994. Victoria University of Wellington has courses in New Zealand Sign Language, although it has yet to develop a major programme for it. Auckland University of Technology (AUT) offers a 3-year Bachelor of Arts course with an NZSL-English Interpreting major.

== Variants ==
Differences in lexicon in New Zealand Sign Language have largely developed through the student communities surrounding five schools for the deaf in New Zealand:

- Van Asch Deaf Education Centre (formerly Sumner School for the Deaf), opened 1880 (Christchurch)
- St Dominic's School for the Deaf, opened 1944 in Wellington, moved to Feilding in 1953
- Titirangi School for the Deaf, opened 1942 and closed in the end of 1959 (when the classes opened at Kelston, Titirangi became a boarding house)
- Mt Wellington School for the Deaf opened (due to overflow at Titirangi) 1952 and closed in the end of 1959 – when the classes opened at Kelston, Mt Wellington became a boarding house.
- Kelston School for the Deaf, opened 1958 (Auckland) and Kelston School for the Deaf Children was renamed in 1991 to Kelston Deaf Education Centre.

== See also ==
- Sign Language Interpreters Association of New Zealand
- English Language Act 2026
- Maori Language Act 1987
