= Drisana Levitzke-Gray =

Australian disability rights campaigner

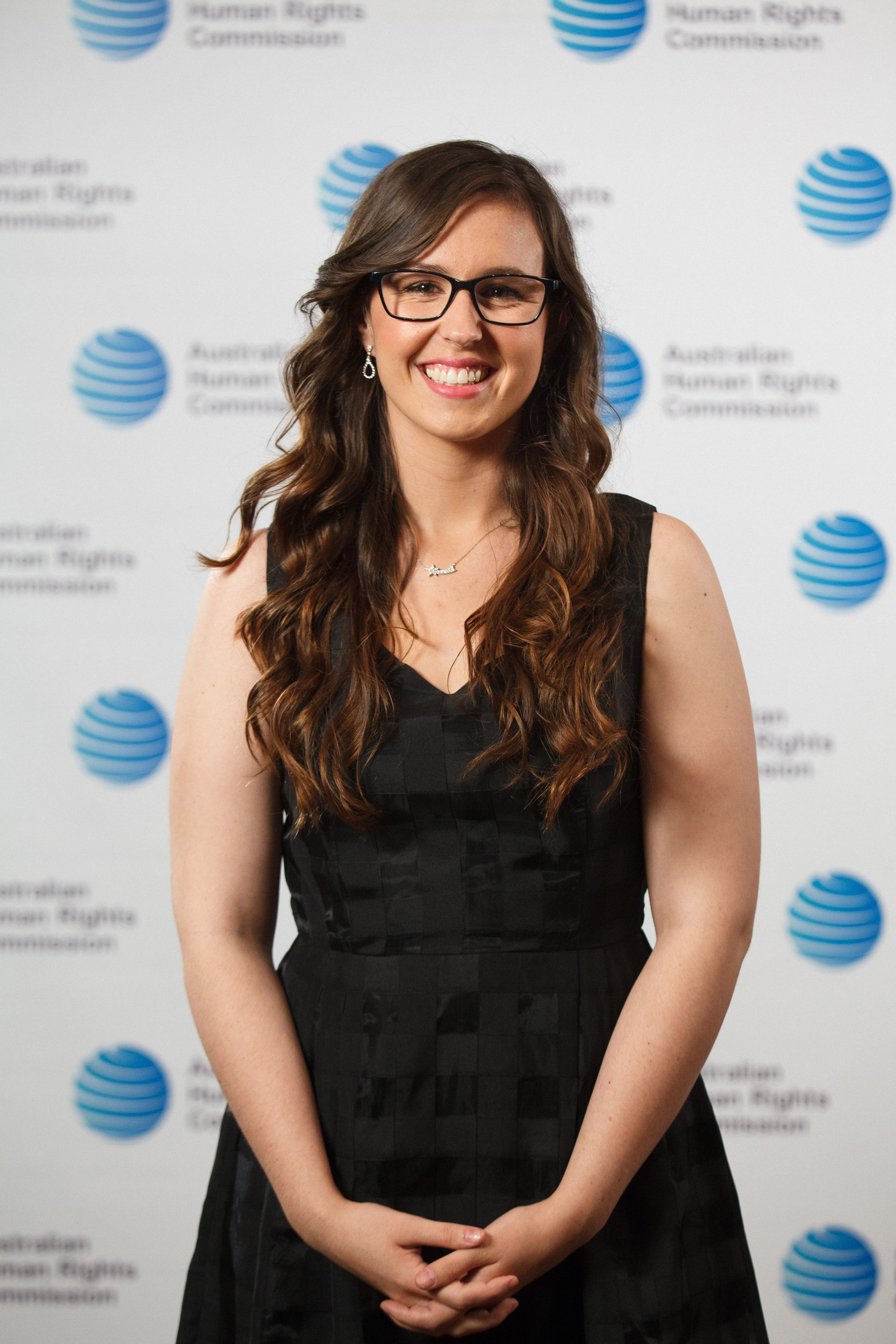
Levitzke-Gray in 2015

Drisana Levitzke-Gray (born 1993) is an Australian disability rights campaigner from Perth, Western Australia. She is an advocate for deaf culture, and a native speaker of Auslan. In 2015, she was the Young Australian of the Year.

== Personal life ==
Levitzke-Gray was born from a line of deaf women, and is the fifth woman on her line to be deaf or partially deaf: great, great-grandmother Eva Johnston, her daughter Dorothy Shaw, Danielle Shaw, Patricia Levitzke-Gray, and herself. Her father is also deaf, and she has a deaf brother.

== Deaf culture ==
Levitzke-Gray was selected in 2011 by Deaf Australia to attend the World Federation of the Deaf Youth Section Leadership Camp in Durban, South Africa, and the World Federation of the Deaf General Assembly.

Levitzke-Gray attended the Frontrunners international deaf youth leadership course in 2012 and 2013.

In January 2014, Levitzke-Gray was the first deaf person in Western Australia and Australia to participate in jury duty.

== Awards ==
- Aspects of Tourism Award - Shenton College, WA
- 2013 - Deaf Australia Youth of the Year
- 2015 - Young Australian of the Year
