= Aaron Cicourel =

American sociologist (1928–2023)

Aaron Victor Cicourel (August 29, 1928 – July 22, 2023) was an American sociologist. A professor of sociology who spent much of his career at the University of California, San Diego, he specialized in sociolinguistics, medical communication, decision-making, and child socialization. He was intellectually influenced greatly by Alfred Schutz, Erving Goffman, and Harold Garfinkel.

== Life and career ==
After receiving his B.A and M.A. from UCLA and his PhD from Cornell University, Cicourel accepted posts as visiting assistant professor at Northwestern University, assistant professor to associate professor at the University of California, Riverside, visiting professor at the University of Buenos Aires in Argentina, lecturer in the Department of Sociology and associate research sociologist in the Center for the Study of Law and Society at the University of California at Berkeley, visiting professor at Columbia University, professor of sociology at the University of California at Berkeley, professor of sociology at the University of California at Santa Barbara, professor in the School of Medicine and Department of Sociology at the University of California at San Diego, and research professor of cognitive science at the latter institution.

Cicourel held a Russell Sage Foundation Post Doctoral Fellowship at the University of California at Los Angeles Medical Center, a National Science Foundation Senior Postdoctoral Fellowship at London University in England, a Guggenheim Fellowship at the University of Madrid in Spain, and was a Fulbright lecturer in Brazil and Spain. In November 2007, he was awarded Docteur Honoris Causa by Université de Fribourg in Switzerland, and in 2008 was awarded Doctor Honoris Causa Complutense University of Madrid.

Cicourel was elected Fellow of the American Academy of Arts and Sciences and of the American Association for the Advancement of Science. Cicourel lived in Berkeley, California.

Cicourel was likely the first scholar to use the full name of "British Sign Language" in an academic publication.

Aaron Cicourel died on July 22, 2023, at the age of 94.

== Selected bibliography ==
- Le Raisonnement Medical. Paris: Seuil. (Also published in Korean)
- The Educational Decision-Makers. NY: Bobbs-Merrill (with J.Kitsuse) (Also published in Japanese)
- Method and Measurement in Sociology. NY: Free Press, 1964. (Also published in German, Japanese and Spanish).
- The Social Organization of Juvenile Justice. NY: Wiley, 1968. (Reprinted in 1976 and 1994)
  - French translation released in 2018, La justice des mineurs au quotidien de ses services, Editions ies, Genève (ebook available)
- Cognitive Sociology: Language and Meaning in Social Interaction. New York: Free Press. 1974.
- Theory and Methods in a Study of Argentine Fertility. NY: Wiley-Interscience, 1974.
- Language Use and Classroom Performance. (with others) NY: Academic Press, 1974.
- Three Models of Discourse Analysis. Discourse Processes 3:101–131.
- Interpenetration of Communicative Contexts: Examples from Medical Encounters. Social Psychology Quarterly.
- Formal semantics, pragmatics, and situated meaning. In Pragmatics at Issue, Vol. 1, edited by J. Verschueren. Amsterdam: John Benjamins.
