= South African Sign Language =

Official sign language of South Africa

- Native to: South Africa
- Native speakers: 235,000 (2011 census)
- Language family: BANZSL: South African Sign Language

Official status
- Official language in: South Africa

Language codes
- ISO 639-3: sfs
- Glottolog: sout1404

South African Sign Language (SASL, Afrikaans: Suid-Afrikaanse Gebaretaal) is the primary sign language used by deaf people in South Africa. The South African government added a National Language Unit for South African Sign Language in 2001. SASL is not the only manual language used in South Africa but it is being promoted as the language to be used, although Deaf people in South Africa historically do not form a single group.

In 1995, the previous South African National Council for the Deaf (SANCD) was transformed into the Deaf Federation of South Africa (DeafSA), which resulted in a radical policy change in matters for Deaf people in South Africa, such as the development and adoption of a single sign language and the promotion of sign language over oralism. Schools for the deaf have remained largely untransformed, however, and different schools for Deaf children in South African still use different sign language systems. At several schools for the Deaf the use of any sign language is either discouraged or simply not taught. There are as many as twelve different systems of signed oral language in South Africa.

In addition to South African sign languages, American Sign Language (ASL) is also used by some Deaf people in South Africa. Most local sign languages in South Africa show the influence of American Sign Language.

In South Africa, newscasts on television employ the sign language known as SASL. The South African parliament also uses sign language, however different sign language interpreters are known to use various signals for the same topics. There are around 40 schools for the Deaf in South Africa, most using a variety of SASL.

Sign language is explicitly mentioned in the South African constitution, and the South African Schools Act permits the study of the language in lieu of another official language at school.

By 2011, there were 84 SASL interpreters on DeafSA's interpreter register, including 43 without any training, 31 who have completed 240 study hours of interpreter training, and 10 who have gained an additional 3 years' experience and completed a further 480 study hours. A total of seven SASL interpreters have actually been accredited by SATI/DeafSA. SASL interpreters can apply for accreditation without having completed any formal training in SASL.

== Status ==
South African Sign Language is not entirely uniform and continues to evolve. Due to the geographical spread of its users and past educational policies, there are localised dialects of South African Sign Language and signs with many variants. Earlier efforts to create reference material and standardise the language, such as books (1980 Talking to the Deaf, 1994 Dictionary of SASL), can only be used as historical records of the language. Daily TV broadcasts in sign language give today's South African Sign Language its national cohesion and unity.

=== Official recognition ===
Sign language is mentioned in four South African laws, namely the Constitution, the Use of Official Languages Act, the South African Schools Act, and the Pan South African Language Board Act.

In May 2022, the 18th Constitutional Amendment Bill to make SASL an official language, was published for public comment. In May 2023 the bill was voted on by parliament, and on 19 July 2023 it was signed into law.

==== General recognition ====
The Constitution states that a board named the Pan South African Language Board should be established to "promote, and create conditions for, the development and use of ... sign language". In terms of the law that establishes the Pan South African Language Board (Act 59 of 1995), the board may establish language bodies to advise it on "any particular language, sign language or augmentative and alternative communication".

In terms of the Use of Official Languages Act, Act No. 12 of 2012, all government departments and government entities must have a language policy that states which languages are considered the official languages of that entity, and each language policy must also specify how that department or entity intends to communicate with people whose language of choice is "South African sign language".

Until 2023, neither South African Sign Language nor any other sign language was an official language of South Africa. In 2008 the SASL Policy Implementation Conference gathered many key role players including scholars, researchers and teachers, policy makers, advocates and governmental bodies to promote South African Sign Language to become recognised as South Africa's twelfth official language.

==== Educational recognition ====
According to the South African Schools Act, Act 84 of 1996, all schools must have a language policy, and that when selecting languages for such a policy, a "recognised Sign Language" should be evaluated as if it has official language status along with the other eleven official languages.

According to the "Language in Education" policy in terms of section 3(4)(m) of the National Education Policy Act, Act 27 of 1996, the main aims of the Ministry of Education's policy for language in education include "to support the teaching and learning of all other languages required by learners or used by communities in South Africa, including languages used for religious purposes, languages which are important for international trade and communication, and South African Sign Language, as well as Alternative and Augmentative Communication".

South African Sign Language is accepted as one of the languages of instruction in the education of Deaf learners.

=== Demographics ===
The number of deaf people in South Africa (600,000 deaf and 1.4 million people with hearing loss) does not give an accurate depiction of the number of people who communicate in South African Sign Language. Estimates vary greatly, from 700,000 to 2 million users. A request was made to the Human Sciences Research Council (South Africa) to measure this as part of the 2011 census.

== Linguistic features ==
=== Fingerspelling ===
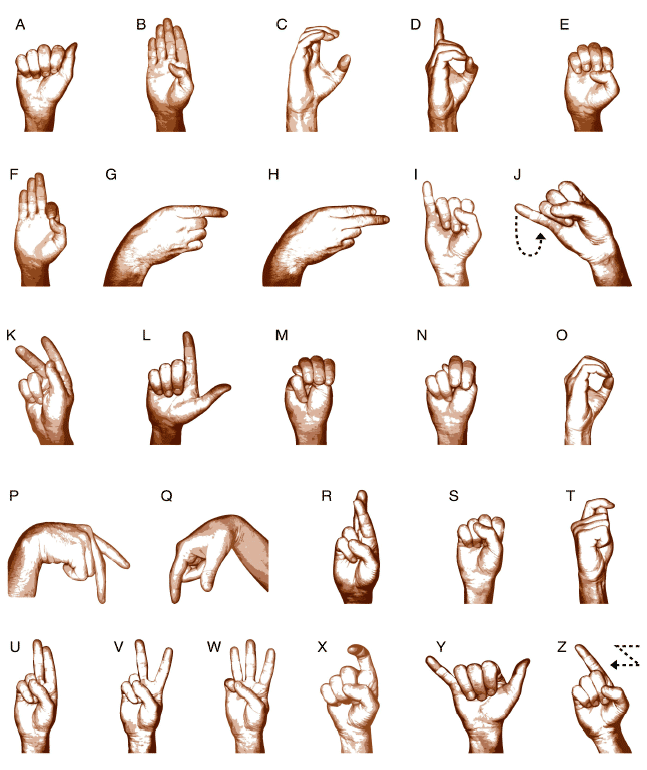
South African Sign Language one-handed manual alphabet for fingerspelling

Fingerspelling is a manual technique of signing used to spell letters and numbers (numerals, cardinals). Therefore, fingerspelling is a sign language technique for borrowing words from spoken languages, as well as for spelling names of people, places and objects. It is a practical tool to refer to the written word.

Some words which are often fingerspelled tend to become signs in their own right (becoming "frozen"), following linguistic transformation processes such as alphanumeric incorporation and abbreviation. For instance, one of the sign-names for Cape Town uses incorporated fingerspelled letters C.T. ( transition from handshape for letter 'C' to letter 'T' of both wrists with rotation on an horizontal axis). The month of July is often abbreviated as 'J-L-Y'.

Fingerspelling words is not a substitute for using existing signs: it takes longer to sign and it is harder to perceive. If the fingerspelled word is a borrowing, fingerspelling depends on both users having knowledge of the oral language (English, Sotho, Afrikaans etc.). Although proper names (such as a person's name, a company name) are often fingerspelled, it is often a temporary measure until the Deaf community agrees on a Sign name replacement.

=== Sign-names and Idioms ===
Sign names are specific signs which are associated with proper names (a location, a person, an organisation). Sign names are often chosen based on a salient physical property. For instance:

- The sign name for Nelson Mandela is signed using a flat B-hand that follows a hair-line over the head.
- The sign name for the bank ABSA is made with both hands following the movement implied in the company corporate logo.

=== Variation ===
South Africa is one of a few countries to have legal recognition of sign language. There is presumably some regional variation, but signers from across the country can readily understand each other, as demonstrated for example at the annual Deaf Forum.

It is commonly believed among South Africans, even among Deaf South Africans, that different language communities have different sign languages. This is evidently the result of the Deaf not being able to understand sign-language interpreters from other communities. However, this is because such "interpreters" do not actually use sign language, but rather Signed English, Signed Xhosa, etc., and only those who have been schooled in these artificial codes can understand them. (See manually coded language in South Africa.)

== History of education of the Deaf in South Africa ==
BANZSL family tree

Old British Sign Language (c. 1760–1900)
Maritime SL (c. 1860–present)	Swedish SL family? (c. 1800–present)
Papua NG SL (c. 1990–present)	Fiji Sign Language	Auslan (c. 1860–present)	New Zealand SL (c. 1870–present)	British SL (c. 1900–present)	Northern Ireland SL (c. 1920–present)	South African SL (c. 1860–present)

Timeline:

- 1863: Irish nuns start training programmes in sign language
- 1874: Grimley Institute for the Deaf and Dumb established by Bridget Lynne in Cape Town
- 1881: De La Bat school established in Worcester
- 1920: Adoption of oralism in Deaf schools
- 1934: Separation between European and Non-European schools
- 1941: First school "for the Black Deaf" established
- 1984: Medium of education changed from vernacular (native tongue) to English in Department of Education and Training schools
- 1996: "Sign language" (but not specifically SASL) mentioned in the Constitution of the Republic of South Africa as a language to be promoted

As early as 1863, Irish nuns were involved in training programmes for the Deaf. Irish Sign Language, "originally heavily influenced by French Sign Language" is said to have had a noticeable influence in sign languages in the world, including in South Africa.

In 1874 in Cape Town, the first institution for the Deaf called Grimley Institute for Deaf and Dumb was established by an Irish Deaf woman named Bridget Lynne.

In 1881 in Worcester, De La Bat school for the Deaf was established.

From 1877, Dominican sisters started to settle near Durban. In 1884, Sister Stephanie Hanshuber from Germany introduced the oral method in South Africa.

In 1888 "King William's Town Convent School for the Education of the Deaf" was formally opened.

"Since there is little historical evidence, it is presumed that South African Sign Language has a mixture of the Irish influence from the Dominican Irish nuns, and British influence as well as the American influence. (Sign Language is the natural language of the Deaf.)"

== See also ==
- Sign language
- Languages of South Africa
- Manually coded language in South Africa
