= Fiji Sign Language =

Deaf sign language of Fiji

- FSL
- Native to: Fiji
- Language family: indigenous– Auslan creole

Language codes
- ISO 639-3: fjs
- Glottolog: fiji1246

Fiji Sign Language is the local deaf sign language of Fiji. It developed from Australasian Signed English, introduced to the country in the 1980s, but has since undergone influence from other sign languages. Variation between areas and ethnicities is present in Fiji Sign Language.

== Usage ==
Fiji Sign Language is generally used by all deaf people in Fiji irrespective of ethnicity, although differences between areas and ethnicities do exist. For instance, the sign for KAVA is different between Fijian and Indo-Fijian signers, due to the different preparation methods for the drink.

== Geographical distribution ==
As of 2019, Fiji Sign Language was mainly used in Suva and "a few other large centres". Outside of these areas, opportunity to learn the language are much less accessible; deaf students in certain rural areas sometimes have "little access to language and education".

== History ==
Fijian Sign Language developed from Australasian Signed English, which was introduced to Fiji from Australia in the early 1980s. The two primary schools for deaf children, the Gospel School for the Deaf and the Hilton Special School, in Suva, used the system for "many years". Initially, at the Hilton Special School, Fiji signing was proscribed against, and children caught signing were punished, but students still signed to each other in secret. The Hilton Special School later adopted Auslan dictionaries, which influenced Fijian Sign Language. It has since developed many new signs not found in Australasian Signed English and developed differences in its grammar from English. It has also undergone influence from Nigerian Sign Language and New Zealand Sign Language.

BANZSL family tree

Old British Sign Language (c. 1760–1900)
Maritime SL (c. 1860–present)	Swedish SL family? (c. 1800–present)
Papua NG SL (c. 1990–present)	Fiji Sign Language	Auslan (c. 1860–present)	New Zealand SL (c. 1870–present)	British SL (c. 1900–present)	Northern Ireland SL (c. 1920–present)	South African SL (c. 1860–present)
