= Maritime Sign Language =

Maritime Canadian sign language

Maritime Sign Language (MSL)
- Langue des Signes Maritime
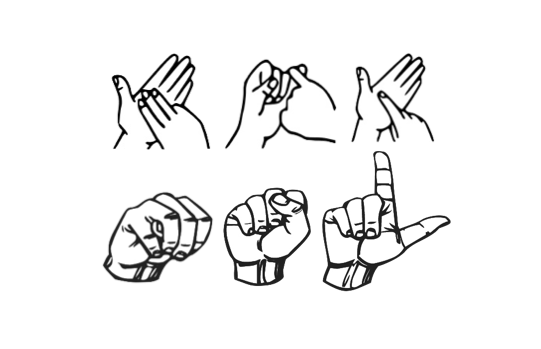
- Top: "MSL" in two-handed BANZSL fingerspelling Bottom: "MSL" in one-handed ASL fingerspelling
- Native to: Canada
- Region: Atlantic Canada
- Native speakers: 90 (2009)
- Language family: BANZSL: Maritime Sign Language (MSL)
- Writing system: none

Language codes
- ISO 639-3: nsr
- Glottolog: mari1381
- ELP: Maritime Sign Language

Maritime Sign Language (MSL; French: Langue des signes maritime) is a sign language used in Canada's Atlantic provinces.

Maritime Sign Language is descended from British Sign Language through the convergence of deaf communities from the Northeastern United States and the United Kingdom who immigrated to Canada during the 18th and 19th centuries. As late as the mid-20th century, it was the dominant form of sign language in The Maritimes and the language of instruction at the Halifax School for the Deaf (1857–1961) and the Atlantic Provinces Special Education Authority in Amherst, Nova Scotia (1961–1995).

MSL is being supplanted by American Sign Language (ASL), so that by 2020, MSL has been largely restricted to older Deaf people in the Maritimes. Younger generations are educated in ASL and have less knowledge of and less regard for MSL, while some of the older generation remain loyal to MSL. The number of MSL speakers is unknown and was estimated to have been fewer than 100 in 2009; most were concentrated in Nova Scotia, some in New Brunswick, while almost none were thought to remain in Newfoundland and Labrador (only three were said to exist) or Prince Edward Island. ASL and MSL have 'blended' in the region. ASL has been demonstrated to influence the vocabulary and grammar of MSL; for example, because the original BANZSL two-handed manual alphabet is no longer used in the Maritimes and has been replaced by the one-handed American manual alphabet, lexicalized signs are developed from one-handed fingerspelling.

Resources (education, interpretation, etc.) for MSL speakers are largely lacking, but a grant to the Nova Scotia Cultural Society of the Deaf produced VHS tapes documenting the language, and in the 2010s a project was started to document placenames in Atlantic Canada in both MSL and ASL, resulting in interactive online maps.

The language is recorded in a 2017 documentary film, Halifax Explosion: The Deaf Experience, and was contrasted with ASL to comic effect in a piece performed at the 2019 Sound Off Theatre Festival in Edmonton about a Nova Scotian and an American travelling in Eastern Canada.

BANZSL family tree

Old British Sign Language (c. 1760–1900)
Maritime SL (c. 1860–present)	Swedish SL family? (c. 1800–present)
Papua NG SL (c. 1990–present)	Fiji Sign Language	Auslan (c. 1860–present)	New Zealand SL (c. 1870–present)	British SL (c. 1900–present)	Northern Ireland SL (c. 1920–present)	South African SL (c. 1860–present)
