= Clark Denmark =

British deaf activist, lecturer and interpreter

Clark Denmark is a British activist, lecturer and interpreter. He is deaf and a British Sign Language (BSL) user, and he is widely recognised within the Deaf community for his role in advancing the recognition and wider understanding of BSL.

== Activity ==
Born and educated in Scotland, Denmark worked at Durham University, where he joined a task force between the BDA and University to develop a sign language training course, which provided teachers with a formal qualification.

He also joined the editorial team of the British Sign Language Dictionary. The Dictionary collects over 1,800 pictures of signs, as well as their definition and explanations, and was published in 1992.

He then joined the University of Bristol's Centre for Deaf Studies when the first degree in Deaf Studies was established in 1992. He taught sign language and deafness-related subjects there for the following 15 years.

He then worked at UCLan on the BSL QED, a project funded by the British Government aimed at bringing British Sign Language in line with the European Language framework, in order to draw a national higher education curriculum for teaching BSL and to create teaching materials to support teachers of BSL. The linguistic resources were made available online.

While at UCLan, Denmark achieved an MA on Deaf studies with a thesis on teaching English to Indian signers through e-learning.

In 1988 he met Princess Diana, who had become a patron of the BDA and was keen to learn more sign language. She was privately tutored by Denmark, and she wrote the foreword of the British Sign Language Dictionary and delivered an address at the BDA's centenary celebrations in 1990.

Well known within the Deaf community, Denmark currently appears often as a television Deaf interpreter on the BBC working for Red Bee Media, translating the news live from spoken English into Sign Language, and as a presenter on the BBC programme See Hear. In 2017 Denmark became the first Deaf person to interpret BBC news live into British Sign Language.
