= Auslan =

Sign language of the Australian deaf community

- Australian sign language
- Native to: Australia
- Region: Australia
- Native speakers: 16,242 (2021 census)
- Language family: BANZSL: Auslan

Language codes
- ISO 639-3: asf
- Glottolog: aust1271
- ELP: Australian Sign Language

Auslan (/ˈɒzlæn/; an abbreviation of Australian Sign Language) is the sign language used by the majority of the Australian deaf community. Auslan is related to British Sign Language (BSL) and New Zealand Sign Language (NZSL); the three have descended from the same parent language, and together comprise the BANZSL language family. As with other sign languages, Auslan's grammar and vocabulary is quite different from spoken English. Its origin cannot be attributed to any individual; rather, it is a natural language that emerged spontaneously and has changed over time.

== Recognition and status ==
Auslan was recognised by the Australian government as a "community language other than English" and the preferred language of the deaf community in policy statements in 1987 and 1991. However, this recognition has yet to filter through to many institutions, government departments, and professionals who work with deaf people.

The emerging status of Auslan has gone hand-in-hand with the advancement of the deaf community in Australia, beginning in the early 1980s. In 1982, the registration of the first sign language interpreters by NAATI, a newly established regulatory body for interpreting and translating, accorded a sense of legitimacy to Auslan, furthered by the publishing of the first dictionary of Auslan in 1989 (Johnston, 1989). Auslan began to emerge as a language of instruction for deaf students in primary and secondary schools from the late 1980s—mainly through the provision of Auslan/English interpreters in mainstream (hearing) schools with deaf support units, but also in some specialised bilingual programmes for deaf children. Boosted by the 1992 enactment of the federal Disability Discrimination Act, Auslan/English interpreters are also increasingly provided in tertiary education.

Today there is a growing number of courses teaching Auslan as a second language, from an elective language subject offered by some secondary schools to a two-year full-time diploma at TAFE.

Auslan content on television in Australia is limited. For some time, "Deaf TV", which was entirely in Auslan and was produced by deaf volunteers, aired on community television station Channel 31 in Melbourne. During the COVID-19 pandemic, Auslan experienced a period of increased visibility through press conferences from federal and state leaders and health officials, which invariably featured Auslan interpreters. Since 2020, the ABC News channel's Sunday 5pm bulletin has included Auslan interpretation.

Auslan Day is celebrated on 13 April each year. This date was chosen as the anniversary of the publication of the first Auslan dictionary in 1989.

=== Prominent advocates for Auslan ===
In 2006 David Gibson was the first member of any Parliament in Australia to give a maiden speech in Auslan and was involved in Auslan events for the National Week of Deaf People at the Queensland Parliament, including the use of Auslan interpreters for question time and a debate between members of the deaf community and members of parliament on disability issues in 2007.

The Young Australian of the Year for 2015, Drisana Levitzke-Gray, is a strong proponent of Auslan and, in her acceptance speech using Auslan, called on the Government of Australia, and Australians, to learn and use Auslan as a natural language, as a human right for Australians.

== History ==
BANZSL family tree

Old British Sign Language (c. 1760–1900)
Maritime SL (c. 1860–present)	Swedish SL family? (c. 1800–present)
Papua NG SL (c. 1990–present)	Fiji Sign Language	Auslan (c. 1860–present)	New Zealand SL (c. 1870–present)	British SL (c. 1900–present)	Northern Ireland SL (c. 1920–present)	South African SL (c. 1860–present)

Thomas Pattison, early deaf educator

Auslan evolved from sign language varieties brought to Australia during the nineteenth century from Britain and Ireland. The earliest record of a deaf Australian was convict Elizabeth Steel, who arrived in 1790 on the Second Fleet ship "Lady Juliana". There is as yet no historical evidence, however, that she used a sign language. One of the first known signing Deaf immigrants was the engraver John Carmichael who arrived in Sydney in 1825 from Edinburgh. He had been to a Deaf school there, and was known as a good storyteller in sign language.

Thirty-five years later, in 1860, a school for the deaf was established by another deaf Scotsman, Thomas Pattison—the Royal Institute for Deaf and Blind Children in New South Wales. In Victoria just a few weeks later, the Victorian College for the Deaf was founded by a deaf Englishman, Frederick J Rose, who had been educated at the Old Kent Road School in London. These schools and others had an enormous role in the development of Auslan, as they were the first contact with sign language for many deaf children. Because they were residential boarding schools, they provided ample opportunity for the language to thrive, even though in many schools, signing was banned from the classroom for much of the 20th century.

Irish Sign Language (ISL) also had an influence on the development of Auslan, as it was used in Roman Catholic deaf schools until the 1950s, especially in Sydney. The first Catholic school for deaf children was established in 1875 by Irish nuns. As such, like Auslan evolving from BSL, Australian Irish Sign Language (or AISL) was born. Unlike British Sign Language, both ISL and AISL use a one-handed alphabet originating in French Sign Language (LSF), and although this alphabet has now almost disappeared from Australia, some initialised signs from the ISL/AISL manual alphabet are still used in Auslan. The language contact post-secondary education between Australian ISL users and 'Australian BSL' users accounts for some of the dialectal differences seen between modern BSL and Auslan.

In more recent times, Auslan has seen a significant amount of lexical borrowing from American Sign Language (ASL), especially in signs for technical terms. Some of these arose from the Signed English educational philosophies of the 1970s and 80s, when a committee looking for signs with direct equivalence to English words found them in ASL and/or in invented English-based signed systems used in North America and introduced them in the classroom. ASL contains many signs initialised from an alphabet which was also derived from LSF, and Auslan users, already familiar with the related ISL alphabet, accepted many of the new signs easily. Tertiary education in the US for some deaf Australian adults also accounts for some ASL borrowings found in modern Auslan.

== Grammar ==
=== Word order ===
Previously, Auslan had been said to be OSV, but more recent scholars have said that this idea is a false-equivalent of Auslan with spoken languages and that using anchor signs is not the same as word order. In general, word order in Auslan takes into account context and fluidity between signs being used, being less rigid than many spoken languages. Rather, Auslan instead follows the clause/word order of TTC—Time, topic, comment. The frequency of SVO in Auslan may come from code-switching with English (with very high bilingualism for Auslan users), as it is more common with "loan words (signs), English-based idiomatic phrases [and] fingerspelling" as well as by those who learned Auslan later in life.

In question phrases, the question word must always be at the end in Auslan in open questions. This word order is the same for both questions and statements, with questions in Auslan formed by either adding a question word at the end of a clause TOM KICKED PETER WHY or using nonmanual features of a questioning expression.

=== Verbs ===
Verbs in Auslan which are depicting signs use head-marking to show the semantic role of the arguments, rather than subject/object. An example of this is the word give, which involves an actor and a recipient. Both of these arguments can be expressed on the verb by using signing space.

Verb predicates can be formed by using individual vocabulary words in sequential order (more commonly used by anglophones who speak Auslan as a second language) or using depicting signs, which can "blur" word order, as it allows for multiple signs to be used at once. This is generally a mark of high competence and fluency in the language. Lexicalisation of common predicates is common, and compounding is the most common way that new lexical items are produced.

Auslan is a zero-copula language, which means that the verb to be is not used at all except when quoting English (in which it is finger-spelt). Auslan replaces copula with interrogatives for certain phrase types, sometimes in this context called "rhetorical questions" or "modifiers", using non-manual features to express that it is a statement rather than a question. The interrogatives of Auslan are more or less direct translations to English ones, with WHY used for this purpose sometimes translated as BECAUSE. Examples of use are as follows:

- Phoebe is an engineer : PHOEBE WHAT ENGINEER
- She is at school : SHE WHERE SCHOOL
- I went shopping with my sister : (BEFORE) I SHOP WITH WHO MY SISTER

=== Pronouns ===
Pronouns are established using the signing space, either arbitrary (for non-present people/things) or iconic. For example, "I will give you the doll tomorrow" would be signed as TOMORROW DOLL GIVE, with the sign GIVE starting at the speaker's body and finishing at the receiver's. The use of signing space also makes all pronouns non-gendered.

== Auslan in relation to English ==
It is sometimes wrongly assumed that English-speaking countries share a single sign language. Auslan is a natural language distinct from spoken or written English. Its grammar and vocabulary often do not have direct English equivalents and vice versa. However, English, as the dominant language in Australia, has had a significant influence on Auslan, especially through manual forms such as fingerspelling and (more recently) Signed English.

It is difficult to sign Auslan fluently while speaking English, as the word order may be different, and there is often no direct sign-to-word equivalence. However, mouthing of an English word together with a sign may serve to clarify when one sign may have several English equivalents. In some cases, the mouth gesture that accompanies a sign may not reflect the equivalent translation in English (e.g. a sign meaning "thick" may be accompanied by a mouth gesture that does not resemble any English word).

=== Fingerspelling ===
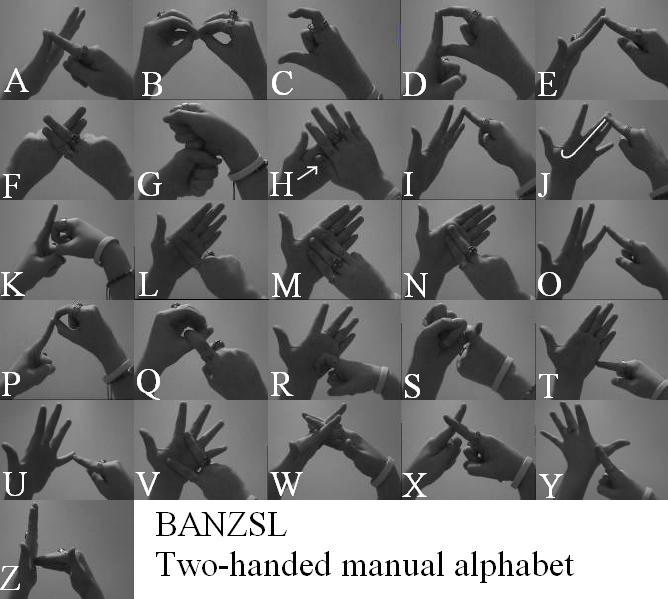
A chart showing the two-handed manual alphabet as used in British Sign Language, Australian Sign Language and New Zealand Sign Language

A two-handed manual alphabet, identical to the one used in British Sign Language and New Zealand Sign Language, is integral to Auslan. This alphabet is used for fingerspelling proper nouns such as personal or place names, common nouns for everyday objects, and English words, especially technical terms, for which there is no widely used sign. Fingerspelling can also be used for emphasis, clarification, or, sometimes extensively, by English-speaking learners of Auslan. The proportion of fingerspelling versus signs varies with the context and the age of the signer. A recent small-scale study puts fingerspelled words in Auslan conversations at about 10% of all lexical items, roughly equal to ASL and higher than many other sign languages, such as New Zealand Sign Language. The proportion is higher in older signers, suggesting that the use of fingerspelling has diminished over time.

Schembri and Johnston (2007) found that the most commonly fingerspelled words in Auslan include "so", "to", "if", "but" and "do".

Some signs also feature an English word's initial letter as a handshape from a one- or two-handed manual alphabet and use it within a sign. For example, part of the sign for "Canberra" incorporates the letter "C".

=== Signed English ===
Australasian Signed English was created in the late 1970s to represent English words and grammar, using mostly Auslan signs together with some additional contrived signs, as well as borrowings from American Sign Language (ASL). It was used largely in education for teaching English to deaf children or for discussing English in academic contexts, and it is not clear to what extent this continues to be the case. It was thought to be much easier for hearing teachers and parents to learn another mode of English than to learn a new language with a complex spatial grammar such as Auslan.

The use of Signed English in schools is controversial with some in the deaf community who regard Signed English as a contrived and unnatural artificially constructed language. Signed English has now been largely rejected by deaf communities in Australia and its use in education is dwindling; however, a number of its signs have made their way into normal use.

== Acquisition and nativeness ==
Unlike oral languages, only a minority of deaf children acquire their language from their parents (about 4 or 5% have deaf parents). Most acquire Auslan from deaf peers at school or later through deaf community networks. Many learn Auslan as a "delayed" first language in adolescence or adulthood, after attempting to learn English (or another spoken/written language) without the exposure necessary to properly acquire it. The deaf community often distinguish between "oral deaf" who grew up in an oral or signed English educational environment without Auslan, and those "Deaf Deaf" who learnt Auslan at an early age from deaf parents or at a deaf school. Regardless of their background, many deaf adults consider Auslan to be their first or primary language, and see themselves as users of English as a second language.

== Variation and standardisation ==
Auslan exhibits a high degree of variation, determined by the signer's age, educational background, and regional origin, and the signing community is very accepting of a wide range of individual differences in signing style.

There is no standard dialect of Auslan. Standard dialects arise through the support of institutions, such as the media, education, government and the law. As this support has not existed for most sign languages, coupled with the lack of a widely used written form and communications technologies, Auslan has probably diverged much more rapidly from BSL than Australian English has from British English.

Auslan was introduced to Papua New Guinea, where it mixed with local or home sign and Tok Pisin to produce Papua New Guinean Sign Language. Sign languages related to Auslan also appear to be used in some other parts of the Asia-Pacific, such as in Fiji.

=== Dialects ===
Linguists often regard Auslan as having two major dialects—Northern (Queensland and New South Wales), and Southern (Victoria, Tasmania, South Australia, and Western Australia). The vocabulary of the two dialects traditionally differed significantly, with different signs used even for very common concepts such as colours, animals, and days of the week; differences in grammar appear to be slight.

These two dialects may have roots in older dialectal differences from the United Kingdom, brought over by deaf immigrants who founded the first schools for the deaf in Australia — varieties from the southeast of England in Melbourne and Scottish varieties in Sydney, although the relationship between lexical variation in the UK and Australia appears much more complicated than this (some Auslan signs appear similar to signs used in a range of regional varieties of BSL). Before schools were established elsewhere, deaf children attended one of these two initial schools, and brought signs back to their own states. As schools opened up in each state, new signs also developed in the dormitories and playgrounds of these institutions. As a result, Auslan users can identify more precise regional varieties (e.g., "Sydney sign", "Melbourne sign", "Perth sign", "Adelaide sign" and "Brisbane sign"), and even vocabulary that may have been unique to individual schools. In a conversation between two strangers, one from Melbourne and the other from Perth, it is likely that one will use a small number of signs unfamiliar to the other, despite both belonging to the same "southern dialect". Signers can often identify which school someone went to, even within a few short utterances.

Despite these differences, communication between Auslan users from different regions poses little difficulty for most deaf Australians, who often become aware of different regional vocabulary as they grow older, through travel and deaf community networks, and because deaf people are so well practised in bridging barriers to communication.

== Indigenous Australian sign languages and Auslan ==
A number of Indigenous Australian sign languages exist, unrelated to Auslan, such as Warlpiri Sign Language and Yolngu Sign Language. They occur in the southern, central, and western desert regions, coastal Arnhem Land, some islands of the north coast, the western side of Cape York Peninsula, and on some Torres Strait Islands. They have also been noted as far south as the Murray River.

Deaf Indigenous people of Far North Queensland (extending from Yarrabah to Cape York) form a distinct signing community using a dialect of Auslan; it has features of Indigenous sign languages and gestural systems as well as signs and grammar of Auslan.

== Written and recorded Auslan ==
Auslan has no written form; in the past transcribing Auslan was largely an academic exercise. The first Auslan dictionaries used either photographs or drawings with motion arrows to describe signs; more recently, technology has made possible the use of short video clips on CD-ROM or online dictionaries.

SignWriting, however, has its adherents in Australia.

A Silent Agreement was Australia's first theatrically released feature film to showcase Australian Sign Language in its main dialogue and as a plot element, with some scenes depicted entirely in Auslan. There is also one scene where the characters discuss the risky politics of using non-deaf actors using sign language in film.

== See also ==
- List of sign languages
