= Annual Population Survey =

Statistical survey

The Annual Population Survey (APS) is a combined statistical survey of households in Great Britain which is conducted quarterly by the Office for National Statistics (ONS). It combines results from the Labour Force Survey (LFS) and the English, Welsh and Scottish Labour Force Survey boosts which are funded by the Department for Education and Skills (DfES), the Department for Work and Pensions (DWP), the Welsh Government and the Scottish Government.

== History ==
APS data was first published in July 2005, containing data collected between January and December 2004. Since then, APS data has been published quarterly but with each dataset relating to a whole year. Between January 2004 and December 2005, an additional sample boost, the APS boost, was introduced but then discontinued in 2006 due to a lack of funding. In 2007, the APS and the LFS data were reweighted by the ONS, now using population estimates for 2007–2008.

The key feature of the APS is its emphasis on relatively small geographic areas, providing information on selected social and socio-economic variables between the 10-yearly censuses. Some of the topics included in the APS are, for example, education, health, employment and ethnicity.

== Methodology and scope ==
The APS is published quarterly with each dataset containing 12 months of data. For each dataset, the sample size is approximately 170,000 households and 360,000 individuals.

== Re-using the data ==
Users can obtain Annual Population Survey data from the UK Data Service website; certain data can also be accessed at the NOMIS website. The Labour Force Survey data service provides tables using APS data.
