= Northern Ireland Sign Language =

Sign language used mainly by deaf people in Northern Ireland

- NISL
- Native to: United Kingdom and Ireland
- Region: Northern Ireland
- Native speakers: "BSL" is the native or preferred language of 3,500 in Northern Ireland (2007)
- Language family: BANZSL Family. Emerging from British, Irish, and American Sign.: Northern Ireland Sign Language

Language codes
- ISO 639-3: –
- Glottolog: None
- IETF: isg-u-sd-gbnir

Northern Ireland Sign language (NISL) is a sign language used mainly by deaf people in Northern Ireland.

NISL is described as being related to Irish Sign Language (ISL) at the syntactic level while the lexicon is based on British Sign Language (BSL) and American Sign Language (ASL).

A number of practitioners see Northern Ireland Sign Language as a distinct and separate language from both BSL and ISL though "many 'Anglo-Irish' Northern Irish signers argue against the use of the acronym NISL and believe that while their variety is distinct, it is still a part of British Sign Language."

As of March 2004 the British Government recognises only British Sign Language and Irish Sign Language as the official sign languages used in Northern Ireland.

BANZSL family tree

Old British Sign Language (c. 1760–1900)
Maritime SL (c. 1860–present)	Swedish SL family? (c. 1800–present)
Papua NG SL (c. 1990–present)	Fiji Sign Language	Auslan (c. 1860–present)	New Zealand SL (c. 1870–present)	British SL (c. 1900–present)	Northern Ireland SL (c. 1920–present)	South African SL (c. 1860–present)
