= Georgina Kleege =

Georgina Kleege (born 1956) is an American writer and a professor of English at University of California, Berkeley. Kleege was diagnosed as legally blind, with macular degeneration, at age 11. Kleege has written classic essays and memoirs in the field of disability studies on blindness and teaches a range of classes at Cal Berkeley with a specialization in creative writing and disability studies. She is best known for her autobiographical collection of essays in 1999 with her book titled Sight Unseen, where she compared her view of the world to the world's view of blindness. Her work often explores the relationship of art, culture, technology, and disability.

== Career ==
Kleege has taught creative writing and literature at Ohio State University and the University of Oklahoma. She is currently As of 8 April 2022 a professor in the Department of English at the University of California at Berkeley. Kleege has received the UC Berkeley Distinguished Teaching Award in 2016, and the Distinguished Teaching Award from the Division of Arts and Humanities in 2013.

== Research contributions ==
Kleege's book Sight Unseen (Yale University Press, 1999), which blends memoir and criticism, was well received. Reviewers from a variety of fields praised it. Alistair Fielder wrote in the British Medical Journal that it "offers a fascinating and scholarly glimpse into a specific impairment (blindness) and, more importantly, provides unique insight into the complex relation between normal function and impairment." Catherine Kudlick wrote for the National Federation of the Blind that it is "not your standard memoir" and that "it has a refreshingly nuanced view of blindness."

Her book Blind Rage: An Open Letter to Helen Keller was published by Gallaudet University Press in 2006. An excerpt from it appeared in Sign Language Studies 7.2 in 2007. In it she reconsiders her childhood hatred of Helen Keller, exploring Keller's iconic status as the most famous deaf-blind person.

Kleege also works to expand existing practices in art history and museum education for the blind and people with low vision. As the child of two parents who were both artists, she points out that many museum programs for the blind assume no vision at all (as opposed to a spectrum of vision) as well as delivering extremely basic, nonspecialist information about art. She has written and spoken to the field of museum education, including a 2005 keynote address to Art Beyond Sight. She also developed a tour and video series called Haptic Encounters in which she touches and describes artworks included in the Contemporary Jewish Museum in San Francisco, highlighting "qualities such as texture, temperature, weight, resilience, and density that may not be apparent to the eyes alone." Her book More than Meets the Eye: What Blindness Brings to Art covers current practices in art description as well as offering the suggestion of turning to blind experts for knowledge about art beyond the visual.

== Publications ==
Her primary works include:

- More Than Meets the Eye: What Blindness Brings to Art (nonfiction), Oxford University Press, 2018, ISBN 9780190604356.
- Home for the Summer (novel), Post-Apollo Press, 1989, ISBN 9780942996128.
- Sight Unseen (nonfiction), Yale University Press, 1999, ISBN 9780300076806.
- Blind Rage: Letters to Helen Keller (nonfiction), Gallaudet University Press, 2006, ISBN 9781563682957.
