= Alker (surname) =

Alker is a surname. Notable people with the surname include:

- Doug Alker (1940–2025), British writer and deaf activist
- Hayward Alker (1937–2007), American academic and writer
- Hermann Alker (1885–1967), German architect
- Imre Alker (born 1941), Hungarian wrestler
- John Alker (fl. 1797–1832), English clockmaker
- Malcolm Alker (born 1978), English rugby league player
- Steve Alker (born 1964), Welsh darts player
- Steven Alker (born 1971), New Zealand golfer
