= Centre for Deaf Studies =

Several institutions are named the Centre for Deaf Studies, including:

- Centre for Deaf Studies, Dublin at Trinity College Dublin, Ireland
- Centre for Deaf Studies, Bristol at the University of Bristol, England
