= Subaltern (postcolonialism) =

Concept from critical theory and post-colonial studies

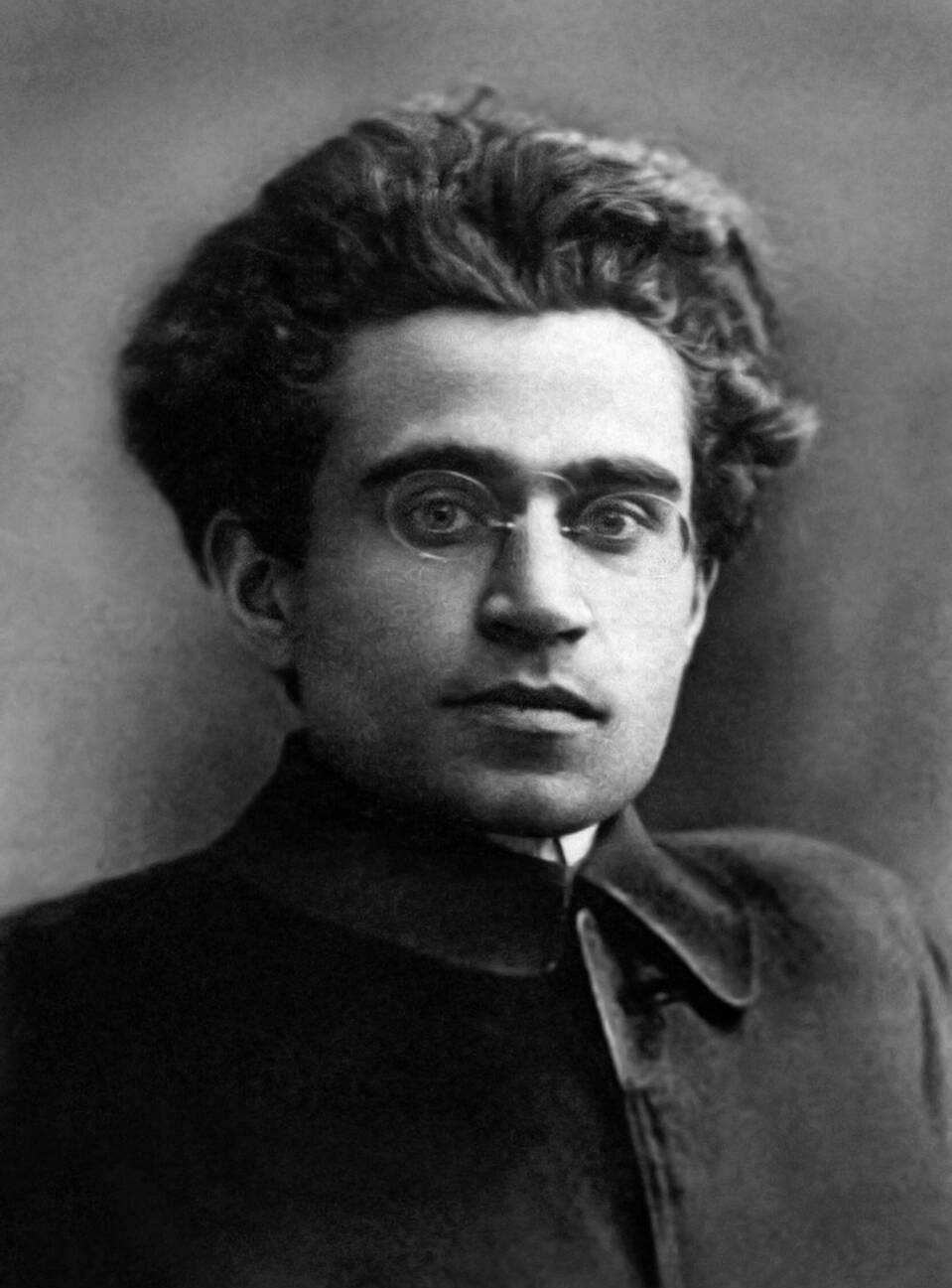
Antonio Gramsci coined the term subaltern to explain the socio-economic status of "the native" in an imperial colony.

In postcolonial studies and in critical theory, subalterns are the colonial populations who are socially, politically, and geographically excluded from the hierarchy of power of an imperial colony and from the metropolitan homeland of an empire. Antonio Gramsci coined the term subaltern to identify the cultural hegemony that excludes and displaces specific people and social groups from the socio-economic institutions of society, in order to deny their agency and voices in colonial politics. The terms subaltern and subaltern studies entered the vocabulary of post-colonial studies through the works of the Subaltern Studies Group of historians who explored the political-actor role of the common people who constitute the mass population, rather than re-explore the political-actor roles of the social and economic elites in the history of India.

As a method of investigation and analysis of the political role of subaltern populations, Karl Marx's theory of history presents colonial history from the perspective of the proletariat; that the who? and the what? of social class are determined by the economic relations among the social classes of a society. Since the 1970s, the term subaltern has denoted the colonized peoples of the Indian subcontinent, imperial history told from below, from the perspective of the colonized peoples, rather than from the perspective of the colonizers from Western Europe. By the 1980s, the Subaltern Studies method of historical enquiry was applied to South Asian historiography. As a method of intellectual discourse, the concept of the subaltern originated as a Eurocentric method of historical enquiry for the study of non-Western peoples (of Africa, Asia, and the Middle East) and their relation to Western Europe as the centre of world history. Subaltern studies became the model for historical research of the subaltern's experience of colonialism in the Indian subcontinent.

== Denotations ==
In postcolonial theory, the term subaltern describes the lower social classes and the Other social groups displaced to the margins of a society; in an imperial colony, a subaltern is a native man or woman without human agency, as defined by his or her social status. Nonetheless, the feminist scholar Gayatri Chakravorty Spivak cautioned against an over-broad application of the term the subaltern, because the word:

subaltern is not just a classy word for "oppressed", for Other, for somebody who's not getting a piece of the pie ... . In post-colonial terms, everything that has limited or no access to the cultural imperialism is subaltern—a space of difference. Now, who would say that's just the oppressed? The working class is oppressed. It's not subaltern ... .
Many people want to claim [the condition of] subalternity. They are the least interesting and the most dangerous. I mean, just by being a discriminated-against minority on the university campus; they don't need the word 'subaltern' ... . They should see what the mechanics of the discrimination are. They're within the hegemonic discourse, wanting a piece of the pie, and not being allowed, so let them speak, use the hegemonic discourse. They should not call themselves subaltern.

In Marxist theory, the civil sense of the term subaltern was first used by Antonio Gramsci (1891–1937). In discussions of the meaning of the term subaltern in the work of Gramsci, Spivak said that he used the word as a synonym for the proletariat (a code word to deceive the prison censor to allow his manuscripts out the prison), but contemporary evidence indicates that the term was a novel concept in Gramsci's political theory. The postcolonial critic Homi K. Bhabha emphasized the importance of social power relations in defining subaltern social groups as oppressed, racial minorities whose social presence was crucial to the self-definition of the majority group; as such, subaltern social groups, nonetheless, also are in a position to subvert the authority of the social groups who hold hegemonic power.

In Toward a New Legal Common Sense (2002), the sociologist Boaventura de Sousa Santos applied the term subaltern cosmopolitanism to describe the counter-hegemonic practice of social struggle against Neoliberalism and globalization, especially the struggle against social exclusion. Moreover, de Sousa Santos applied subaltern cosmopolitanism as interchangeable with the term cosmopolitan legality to describe the framework of diverse norms meant to realise an equality of differences, wherein the term subaltern identifies the oppressed peoples, at the margins of society, who are struggling against the hegemony of economic globalization. Context, time, and place determine who, among the marginalised peoples, is a subaltern; in India, women, Shudras and Dalits (also known as Untouchables), and rural migrant labourers are part of the subaltern social stratum.

In his 2003 work Understanding Deaf Culture: In Search of Deafhood, deaf scholar Paddy Ladd employs the term subaltern in reference to Deaf culture as a culturo-linguistic minority within a majority (hearing) culture, especially in reference to Deaf epistemologies.

== Theory ==
Postcolonial theory studies the power and the continued dominance of Western ways of intellectual enquiry, the methods of generating knowledge. In the book Orientalism (1978), Edward Said conceptually addresses the oppressed subaltern native to explain how the Eurocentric perspective of Orientalism produced the ideological foundations and justifications for the colonial domination of the Other. Before their actual explorations of The Orient, Europeans had invented imaginary geographies of the Orient; predefined images of the savage peoples and exotic places that lay beyond the horizon of the Western world. The mythologies of Orientalism were reinforced by travellers who returned from Asia to Europe with reports of monsters and savage lands, which were based upon the conceptual difference and strangeness of the Orient; such cultural discourses about the Oriental Other were perpetuated through the mass communications media of the time, and created an Us-and-Them binary social relation with which the Europeans defined themselves by defining the differences between the Orient and the Occident. As a foundation of colonialism, the Us-and-Them binary social relation misrepresented the Orient as backward and irrational lands, and, therefore, in need of the European civilizing mission, to help them become modern, in the Western sense; hence, the Eurocentric discourse of Orientalism excludes the voices of the subaltern natives, the Orientals, themselves.

The cultural theorist Stuart Hall said that the power of cultural discourse created and reinforced Western dominance of the non-Western world. That the European discourses describing the differences between The West and The East, applied European cultural categories, languages, and ideas to represent the non-European Other. The knowledge produced by such discourses became social praxis, which then became reality; by producing a discourse of difference, Europe maintained Western dominance over the non Western-European Other, using a binary social relation that created and established the Subaltern native, realised by excluding The Other from the production of discourse, between the East and the West.

== The voice of the subaltern ==
In Geographies of Post colonialism (2008), Joanne Sharp developed Spivak's line of reasoning that Western intellectuals displace to the margin of intellectual discourse the non–Western forms of "knowing" by re-formulating, and thus intellectually diminishing, such forms of acquiring knowledge as myth and folklore. To be heard and to be known, the subaltern native must adopt Western ways of knowing (language, thought, reasoning); because of such Westernization, a subaltern people can never express their native ways of knowing, and, instead, must conform their native expression of knowledge to the Western, colonial ways of knowing the world. The subordinated native can be heard by the colonisers only by speaking the language of their empire; thus, intellectual and cultural filters of conformity muddle the true voice of the subaltern native. For example, in Colonial Latin America, the subordinated natives conformed to the colonial culture, and used the linguistic filters of religion and servitude when addressing their Spanish imperial rulers. To make effective appeals to the Spanish Crown, slaves and natives would address the rulers in ways that masked their own, native ways of speaking.

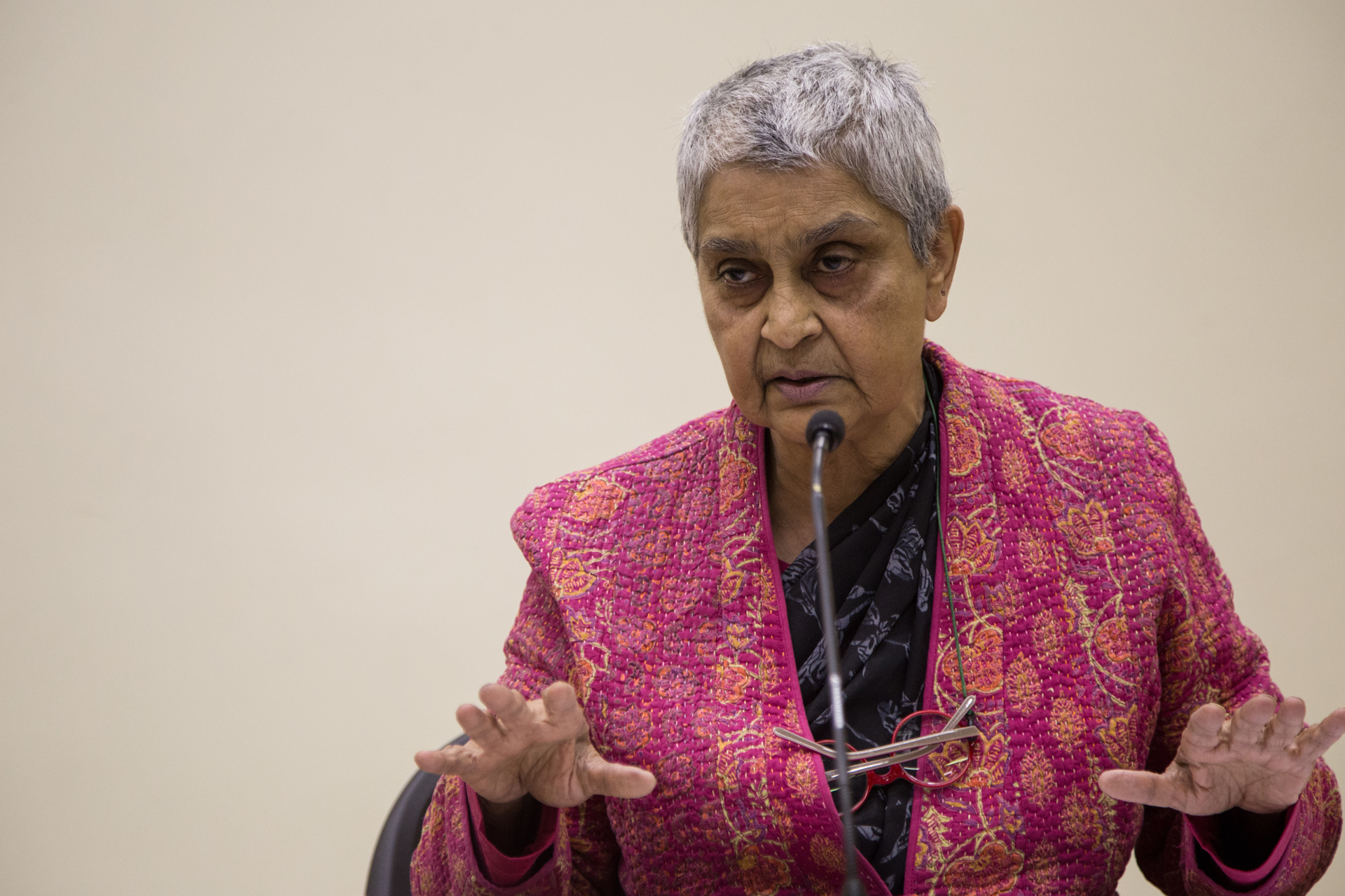
Indian philosopher and theorist Gayatri Spivak, seen here giving a speech at the Internationaler Kongress in Berlin

The historian Fernando Coronil said that his goal as an investigator must be "to listen to the subaltern subjects, and to interpret what I hear, and to engage them and interact with their voices. We cannot ascend to a position of dominance over the voice, subjugating its words to the meanings we desire to attribute to them. That is simply another form of discrimination. The power to narrate somebody's story is a heavy task, and we must be cautious and aware of the complications involved." Like Spivak, bell hooks questions the academic's engagement with the non–Western Other. That in order to truly communicate with the subaltern native, the academic would have to remove him or herself as "the expert" at the center of the Us-and-Them binary social relation. Traditionally, the academic wants to learn of the subaltern native's experiences of colonialism, but does not want to know the subaltern's (own) explanation of his or her experiences of colonial domination. In light of the mechanics of Western knowledge, hooks said that a true explanation can come only from the expertise of the Western academic, thus, the subaltern native surrenders knowledge of colonialism to the investigating academic. About the binary relationship of investigation, between the academic and the subaltern native, hooks said that:

[There is] no need to hear your [native] voice, when I can talk about you better than you can speak about yourself. No need to hear your voice. Only tell me about your pain. I want to know your story. And then I will tell it back to you in a new way. Tell it back to you in such a way that it has become mine, my own. Re-writing you, I write myself anew. I am still author, authority. I am still [the] colonizer, the speaking subject, and you are now at the center of my talk.

The subaltern voice is used in order to explore the experience of colonialism from the perspective of the oppressed and powerless. This may range from the social to the economic, and focusses on the effects of imperialism on those whom it disadvantaged. It is thus important that such narratives are not viewed from a standpoint of cultural superiority.

== Development discourse ==
According to the subaltern perspective, colonial and Orientalist thinking is integral to mainstream development discourse. This discourse advocates modernization theory, the notion that an underdeveloped country's modernization should follow the path to modernization taken (and established) by the developed countries of the West. As such, proponents identify capitalist economic systems, free trade, open markets, and liberal democratic state governance as the means by which countries should modernize en route to becoming "developed" like Western countries. This stance claims that participants in mainstream development discourse misconstrue Western social, political, economic, and cultural policies as universally applicable and indeed advocate applying them to every country in order to modernize it.

In Making Development Geography (2007), Victoria Lawson presents a critique of mainstream development discourse as mere recreation of the Subaltern, which is effected by means of the subaltern being disengaged from other social scales, such as the locale and the community; not considering regional, social class, ethnic group, sexual- and gender-class differences among the peoples and countries being modernized; the continuation of the socio-cultural treatment of the subaltern as a subject of development, as a subordinate who is ignorant of what to do and how to do it; and by excluding the voices of the subject peoples from the formulations of policy and practice used to effect the modernization.

As such, the subaltern are peoples who have been silenced in the administration of the colonial states they constitute, they can be heard by means of their political actions, effected in protest against the discourse of mainstream development, and, thereby, create their own, proper forms of modernization and development. Hence do subaltern social groups create social, political, and cultural movements that contest and disassemble the exclusive claims to power of the Western imperialist powers, and so establish the use and application of local knowledge to create new spaces of opposition and alternative, non-imperialist futures.

== Bibliography ==
- Dube, Saurabh / Seth, Sanjay / Skaria, Ajay (Ed.): Dipesh Chakrabarty and the Global South: Subaltern Studies, Postcolonial Perspectives, and the Anthropocene, Routledge, London/New York 2020.
- Darder, Antonia: Decolonizing Interpretive Research: A Subaltern Methodology for Social Change, Routledge, London/New York 2019.
- Santos, Boaventura de Sousa: Toward a New Legal Common Sense, 2nd ed. (London: LexisNexis Butterworths), particularly, 2002: 458–493.
- Chakrabarty, Dipesh: Habitations of Modernity: Essays in the Wake of Subaltern Studies. University of Chicago Press 2002.
- Rodríguez, Ileana: The Latin American subaltern studies reader. Duke University Press, North Carolina 2001.
- Guha, Ranajit: Subaltern Studies Reader, 1986-1995. University of Minnesota Press 1997.
- Bhabha, Homi K.: "Unsatisfied: notes on vernacular cosmopolitanism." In: Text and Nation: Cross-Disciplinary Essays on Cultural and National Identities. Ed. Laura Garcia-Moreno and Peter C. Pfeiffer. Columbia, SC: Camden House, 1996: 191-207.
- Spivak, Gayatri Chakravorty: "Can the Subaltern Speak?". In: Marxism and the Interpretation of Culture. Eds. Cary Nelson and Lawrence Grossberg. Urbana, IL: University of Illinois Press, 1988: 271-313.
