= Jon Henner =

American linguist, academic, and theorist

- Born: Jonathan Henner
- Died: August 14, 2023 (aged 40)
- Spouse: Emily Carrigan
- Children: 3

Academic background
- Education: Illinois State University, BA, 2005; Walden University, MS, 2008; Boston University. Ed.D., 2016
- Thesis: The relationship between American Sign Language vocabulary and the development of language-based reasoning skills in deaf children (2016)

Jonathan Henner (died August 14, 2023) was an American linguist, academic, and theorist.

== Biography ==
Henner was born Jonathan Henner on November 26, 1982.. Raised in near Chicago, Henner attended John Hersey High School.

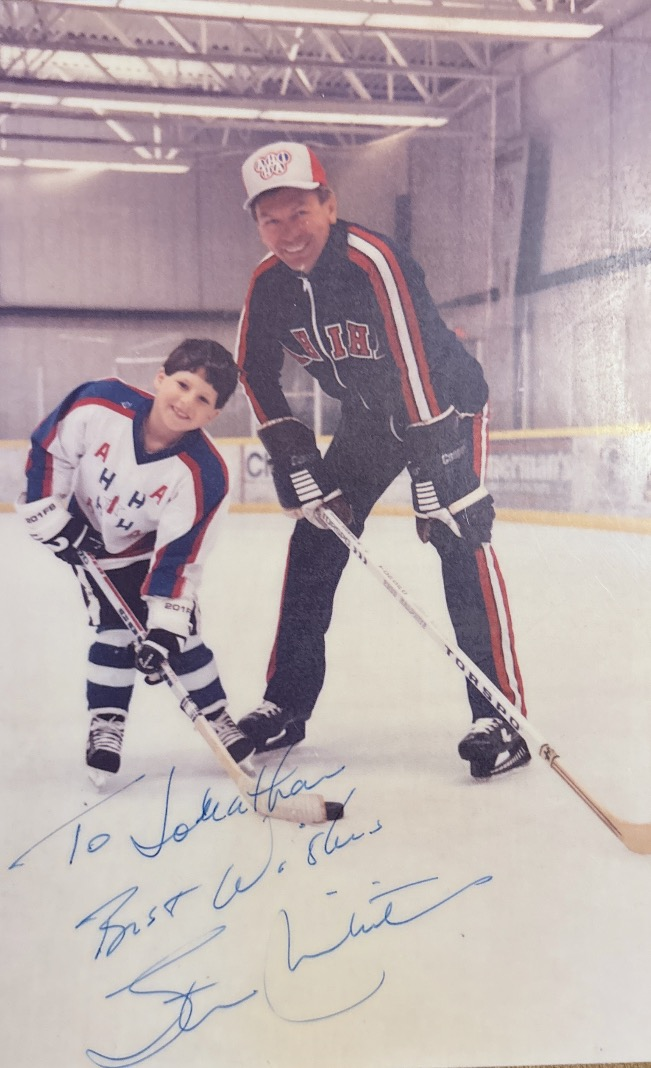
Jon Henner pictured next to Hall of Fame player Stan Mikita

Briefly attending Gallaudet University, Henner transferred to Illinois State University. Expelled from the deaf education program for challenging its views of deaf children, Henner graduated in 2005 with a bachelors in philosophy. In 2008, Henner was awarded a master's in psychology from Walden University. Under the supervision of Robert J. Hoffmeister, Henner was awarded his Doctor of Education in Developmental Studies form Boston University.

He was a Visiting Assistant Professor at the College of the Holy Cross for one year, where he began a collaboration with Octavian Robinson, who introduced him to disability theory, disability justice, and deaf epistemologies. In 2016, Henner became an Assistant Professor in Professions in Deafness at the University of North Carolina Greensboro School of Education. Promoted to Associate Professor in 2022, Henner was the university's first Deaf tenured professor.

Jon Henner was formerly married to Tamara Schmidt, with whom he had one child, and then went on to marry Emily Carrigan, with whom he had two children. On August 14, 2023, Henner died from cancer aged 40.

== Scholarly work ==
In collaboration with Octavian Robinson, Henner originated a named framework, Crip Linguistics, for understanding the intersection of language and disability. This was first published in a 2023 manifesto, and then as The Crip Linguistics Reader. The core idea in this framework is that many common ways understanding language across linguistics, speech language pathology, and education, carry ableist and audist notions that some ways of using language are good and correct and others are bad or broken. Crip Linguistics instead holds that all the ways that people use language are deserving of dignity, a stance Henner captured in an often quoted line: "How you language is beautiful. Don’t let anyone tell you your languaging is wrong. Your language is the story of your life." In Crip Linguistics Goes to School, Henner and Robinson argued that education systems often police the language of disabled students, forcing children to conform to normative language practices (e.g., forcing deaf children to try to learn to hear and speak) in ways that are harmful. For deaf children, they argued, rather than expecting children to conform to normative language standards, "Teachers of the deaf must have attained the fluency in all languages that their students are expected to use." Following his death, the Journal of Deaf Studies and Deaf Education dedicated a special issue to the topic. Crip Linguistics has since been taken up by scholars across disciplines, informing research on sign language linguistic theory, the language practices of deaf immigrants, and disabled young children's early literacy.

Henner published a significant amount of his academic perspectives on Twitter, where he wrote frequently about his academic work informed by "his personal experience as a Jewish gender-bending multiply disabled autistic deaf parent... and for the last six years of his life, as someone grappling with advanced melanoma, chronic pain, and illness." He was deliberate about writing about academic topics outside the cannon, and in mainstream venues as a way of "centering perspectives that aren't journal sanitized" and "including marginalized folks doing work on their languages and communities."

In 2021, he wrote a tweet that sparked a controversy about the sign language interpreter that had been hired to interpret for the Biden administration's press briefings, Heather Mewshaw. Mewshaw had also appeared in videos from a group called Right Side ASL that included political misinformation and conspiracy theories. The Washington Post and TIME quoted him explaining how an interpreter's personal beliefs can color their interpretation, and that conflicts of interest can undermine the credibility of a translation, and that giving Mewshaw a national platform was harmful to deaf communities.

== Selected Bibliography ==
=== Books and edited volumes ===
- Robinson, Octavian; Moriarty, Erin; Henner, Jon, eds. (2025). ''The Crip Linguistics Reader''. Gallaudet University Press.
- Enns, Charlotte; Henner, Jonathan; McQuarrie, Lynn, eds. (2021). Discussing Bilingualism in Deaf Children: Essays in Honor of Robert Hoffmeister. Routledge.
- Kurz, Christopher; Golos, Debbie; Kuntze, Marlon; Henner, Jon; Scott, Jessica (2021). Guidelines for Multilingual Deaf Education Teacher Preparation Programs. Gallaudet University Press.

=== Journal articles ===
- Robinson, Octavian E.; Henner, Jonathan (2017). "The personal is political in The Deaf Mute Howls: deaf epistemology seeks disability justice". Disability & Society. 32 (9): 1416–1436. doi:10.1080/09687599.2017.1313723.
- Henner, Jon; Caldwell-Harris, Catherine L.; Novogrodsky, Rama; Hoffmeister, Robert (2016). "American Sign Language syntax and analogical reasoning skills are influenced by early acquisition and age of entry to signing schools for the deaf". Frontiers in Psychology. 7: 1982. doi:10.3389/fpsyg.2016.01982. PMC 5183573. PMID 28082932.
- Novogrodsky, Rama; Henner, Jon; Caldwell-Harris, Catherine; Hoffmeister, Robert (2017). "The development of sensitivity to grammatical violations in American Sign Language: native versus nonnative signers". Language Learning. 67 (4): 791–818. doi:10.1111/lang.12245.
- Henner, Jon; Novogrodsky, Rama; Reis, Jeanne; Hoffmeister, Robert (2018). "Recent issues in the use of signed language assessments for diagnosis of language related disabilities in signing deaf and hard of hearing children". The Journal of Deaf Studies and Deaf Education. 23 (4): 307–316. doi:10.1093/deafed/eny014. PMID 29767737.
- Robinson, Octavian; Henner, Jonathan (2018). "Authentic voices, authentic encounters: cripping the university through American Sign Language". Disability Studies Quarterly. 38 (4). doi:10.18061/dsq.v38i4.6111.
- Henner, Jon; Novogrodsky, Rama; Caldwell-Harris, Catherine; Hoffmeister, Robert (2019). "The development of American Sign Language–based analogical reasoning in signing deaf children". Journal of Speech, Language, and Hearing Research. 62 (1): 93–105. doi:10.1044/2018_JSLHR-L-18-0062. PMID 30521664.
- Caselli, Naomi; Hall, Wyatte; Henner, Jon (2020). "American Sign Language interpreters in public schools: an illusion of inclusion that perpetuates language deprivation". Maternal and Child Health Journal. 24 (11): 1323–1329. doi:10.1007/s10995-020-02975-7. PMID 32666224.
- Scott, Jessica; Henner, Jon (2020). "Second verse, same as the first: on the use of signing systems in modern interventions for deaf and hard of hearing children in the USA". Deafness & Education International. doi:10.1080/14643152.2020.1792071 (inactive 24 July 2026).
- Henner, Jon; Pagliaro, Claudia; Sullivan, Sara; Hoffmeister, Robert (2021). "Counting differently: assessing mathematics achievement of signing deaf and hard of hearing children through a unique lens". American Annals of the Deaf. 166 (3): 318–341. doi:10.1353/aad.2021.0023. PMID 34719519.
- Hoffmeister, Robert; Henner, Jon; Caldwell-Harris, Catherine; Novogrodsky, Rama (2022). "Deaf children's ASL vocabulary and ASL syntax knowledge supports English knowledge". The Journal of Deaf Studies and Deaf Education. 27 (1): 37–47. doi:10.1093/deafed/enab032. PMID 34788799.
- Namboodiripad, Savithry; Henner, Jonathan (2022). "Rejecting competence: essentialist constructs reproduce ableism and white supremacy in linguistic theory". Language Learning. doi:10.1111/lang.12534.
- Henner, Jon; Robinson, Octavian (2023). "Unsettling languages, unruly bodyminds: a crip linguistics manifesto". Journal of Critical Study of Communication and Disability. 1 (1): 7–37. doi:10.48516/jcscd_2023vol1iss1.4.
- Henner, Jon; Robinson, Octavian (2023). "Crip linguistics goes to school". Languages. 8 (1): 48. doi:10.3390/languages8010048.
- Scott, Jessica; Henner, Jon; Skyer, Michael E. (2023). "Six arguments for Vygotskian pragmatism in deaf education: multimodal multilingualism as applied harm reduction". American Annals of the Deaf. 168 (1): 56–79. doi:10.1353/aad.2023.a904167. PMID 38588086.
- Nair, Vishnu; et al. (2023). "Accent modification as a raciolinguistic ideology: a commentary in response to Burda et al. (2022)". Journal of Critical Study of Communication and Disability. 1 (1): 105–112. doi:10.48516/jcscd_2023vol1iss1.21.
- Henner, Jon; Robinson, Octavian; Gabriel, Rachael (2025). "Layers, cells, and constellations: Jon Henner's Twitter platform as crip activism". The Journal of Deaf Studies and Deaf Education. 30 (SI): SI7–SI25. doi:10.1093/jdsade/enaf022. PMID 40499936.
- Henner, Jon; Butts, Terynce; Holcomb, Leala (2025). "Tales of a fourth-grade nothingburger: a critical inquiry into deficit-framed research". The Journal of Deaf Studies and Deaf Education. 30 (SI): SI26–SI42. doi:10.1093/jdsade/enaf024. PMID 40499934.
- Gentry, Ashley H.; Henner, Jon; Walker, Kristin; Hoffmeister, Robert (2025). "Learning disability identification in residential schools for deaf students". The Journal of Deaf Studies and Deaf Education. 30 (SI): SI67–SI78. doi:10.1093/jdsade/enaf026. PMID 40315410.
- Scott, Jessica Armytage; Pagliaro, Claudia M.; Kilpatrick, Jennifer Renée; Henner, Jon; Smith-Warshaw, Janice (2025). "Updates and current trends in deaf education teacher preparation programs: an update to Dolman (2010)". The Journal of Deaf Studies and Deaf Education. 30 (SI): SI104–SI115. doi:10.1093/jdsade/enaf032. PMID 40318217.
- Gabriel, Rachael; Holcomb, Leala; Dostal, Hannah; Henner, Jon (2025). "What deaf readers can teach us about science of reading: "all means all" isn't an equity framework for literacy". The Journal of Deaf Studies and Deaf Education. 30 (SI): SI116–SI128. doi:10.1093/jdsade/enaf030. PMID 40499932.

=== Book chapters ===
- Henner, Jon; Hoffmeister, Robert J.; Reis, Jeanne (2017). "Developing sign language measurements for research with deaf populations". In Cawthon, Stephanie; Garberoglio, Carrie Lou (eds.). Research in Deaf Education: Contexts, Challenges, and Considerations. Oxford University Press.

=== Thesis ===
- Henner, Jon (2016). The relationship between American Sign Language vocabulary and the development of language-based reasoning skills in deaf children (EdD). Boston University. hdl:2144/14562.
