= Jeff McWhinney =

Jeff McWhinney (born 1960 in Belfast, Northern Ireland), is a leader in the UK deaf community.

== Early life ==
McWhinney was born into a deaf family in Belfast, both his brother and sister are deaf.

During the Troubles in Northern Ireland loyalists killed his cousin because she married a Roman Catholic.

McWhinney was raised in a bilingual environment, his family who used both British Sign Language (BSL) and as some may say, Northern Ireland Sign Language (NISL) and English. He came to pick up Irish Sign Language (ISL) from the community. He later learned to communicate in American Sign Language (ASL), and French Belgian Sign Language (LSFB).

He was educated at the Jordanstown Schools in Belfast, where there was a teacher who also taught his father. He then went to Mary Hare Grammar School for the deaf in the 1970s.

== Deaf rights and organisations ==
In Belfast, McWhinney was frustrated by the Deaf clubs and organisations that were not managed by deaf people. He started the Northern Ireland Workshop with the Deaf which invited speakers such as Paddy Ladd and George Montgomery to speak about Deaf liberation.

He became the first Secretary of the Euro Youth Deaf Council.

His big break in his career within charities for deaf people, came about in 1984 when he worked for Breakthrough (now DeafPlus), a charity working towards integration between deaf and hearing people.

In 1995 he became the first ever Deaf person, in its 100 plus years history, to be appointed as the chief executive officer (CEO) of the British Deaf Association (BDA), one of the largest societies for deaf people in the UK. From this position, he was involved in gaining UK Government recognition of British Sign Language as an official language.

He also became the Director of the Greenwich Association of Disabled People. Whilst working for the Greater London Council and subsequently the London Borough Disability Resource Team, Jeff has established eleven Deaf Image campaign groups in London and a number of sign language centred services including the UK 's first sign language interpreting booking agency in 1987.

In 1999 McWhinney "challenged a decision made by staff at Woolwich Crown Court that he could not sit as a juror because of his disability, [he however] failed to have the decision overturned".

== "SignVideo" company ==
He left his BDA management post in September 2004 to start up a new video technology enterprise, as managing director of Significan't (UK) Ltd. This company was considered to the fastest growing social enterprise staffed entirely by sign language users.
