= Deaf Bibliography =

- Producer: Karen Nakamura (Japan)
- History: 1984-present

Coverage
- Disciplines: Deaf studies
- Update frequency: Rolling

Links
- Website: www.deaflibrary.org

Deaf Bibliography is a searchable online bibliographic database to works in deaf studies published by Karen Nakamura since 1995. The database can be queried using quick search, Boolean, and faceted search options. Items included are monographs, chapters in edited volumes, journal articles, and pamphlets. It covers all facet of deaf culture, including Japan. Languages included are English and Japanese. Subject areas covered are the social and environmental sciences, humanities and arts, alongside some items from medical, biological, and natural sciences. Every entry in the bibliography is categorised by region, country, and subject, and newer entries are tagged with additional keywords. While the primary concern of the Deaf Bibliography is to cultural deaf models, the bibliography also contains information related to hard of hearing issues.
