= Centre for Deaf Studies, Bristol =

Department of the University of Bristol, England

Centre for Deaf Studies
- Type: Public red brick research university
- Active: 1978–2013
- Parent institution: University of Bristol
- Director: Sandra Smith
- Location: F Block Social Sciences Complex, 8 Woodland Road, Bristol, BS8 1TN, England, United Kingdom; 51°27′37″N 2°36′18″W
- Language: British Sign Language, English
- Research Areas: Linguistics, Sign language Acquisition, Deaf culture, Psychology, Deaf Education, Assistive technology
- Degrees: BSc; MSc; Research MPhil; PhD; Diploma of Higher Education
- Website: Center for Deaf Studies Official Website (Archived)

The Centre for Deaf Studies was a department of the University of Bristol, England, in the field of deaf studies, which it defines as the study of the "language, community and culture of Deaf people". Established in 1978, the centre claimed to be the first higher educational Institute in Europe "to concentrate solely on research and education that aims to benefit the Deaf community". The centre was at the forefront in establishing the disciplines of deaf studies and deafhood. It used British Sign Language (BSL), had a policy of bilingual communication in BSL and English, and employed a majority of deaf teaching staff.

The centre offered Bachelor of Science (BSc) and Master of Science (MSc) courses, as well as research degrees at MPhil and PhD level. Bristol University announced plans to close the BSc course in May 2010 after a failed campaign by the centre's supporters and staff. By 2013 the centre was being gradually shut down by the university, by means of a programme of redundancies and staff attrition.

== History ==
The centre was founded in 1978. Early research into the acquisition and usage of BSL was the first funded research into the topic in the UK. In 1980, the centre produced the first coding manual for BSL, followed by the first textbook on the language in 1985. In 1980, the centre ran the first National Conference on Sign Language in the UK, and the following year it hosted the first International Conference on Sign Language to be held in the UK. It also organised the first International Deaf Researchers Workshop in 1985.

In 1984, the centre coined the term "deaf studies", and in 2001, it established the first professorship in the discipline. Also in 2001, it employed a deaf director, the first time that the head of a European academic centre had been deaf. In 2003, the book Understanding Deaf Culture: In Search of Deafhood, by the centre's researcher Paddy Ladd, popularised the term "deafhood", which Ladd had coined in 1990.

== Research ==
Research at the centre fell into five areas: the language, linguistics and literature of sign language; acquisition of sign language; community and deaf culture, known as "deafhood"; cognition and psychology; and the applications of technology, such as videotelephony and e-learning. An audio-visual phone went on trial with the Avon and Somerset Police.

== Courses and services ==
The centre was an innovator in education. In 1981, it offered the first university-level certificate course in BSL for professionals. In 1985, it started a diploma course, social science in deaf studies. This was followed in 1987 by a part-time course in sign language interpretation, which became full-time in 1990. In 1992, the centre established the earliest full-time, university-level training programme for Deaf people to be taught in sign language. In 1993, a Diploma of Higher Education was established, the earliest undergraduate course on deaf studies in the UK, and in 1999, the first BSc and MSc in deaf studies followed.

Bristol was one of a handful of universities in the UK to offer an undergraduate degree in deaf studies. In May 2010, the university announced plans to close the undergraduate course as part of a drive to save £15 million. The campaign against this focussed on the lack of justice in targeting staff and students with particular needs, and the aggressiveness of the university's approach to the CDS, led by the Dean, Dr Judith Squires. There were accusations that her Faculty saved other units only by sacrificing the CDS. The shutdown of the programme was successful and the last students from the undergraduate degree graduated in 2013.

The centre offered until recently postgraduate courses: a certificate and diploma in deaf studies, and an MSc in Deaf Studies. The centre also offered a range of short courses, including BSL, BSL interpreting and Deafhood studies. Deafstation, a daily news service in BSL, was run by the centre.

== Staff ==
In 2012, close to closure, the centre's director was Sandra Smith. The Harry Crook Professor in Deaf Studies was Jim Kyle, who was at Bristol for over 20 years and is a leading expert on Deaf policy. Other researchers included a Reader, Dr Paddy Ladd, a lecturer, Dr Sarah Batterbury, and several researchers. The majority of teaching staff were Deaf. In late 2012, the academic staff were offered part-time contracts only, or redundancy - to take effect in 2013. All accepted redundancy, except Prof. Kyle. The Deaf community accused Bristol University of trying to close the centre through staff attrition; by shutting the undergraduate degree, they were able to claim that few staff were needed for teaching.

== Closure ==
The university stopped admitting students in 2013. University Council passed a resolution with only a vote of dissent. CDS' closure was the first event in a double-shock for Bristol's Deaf community. The very next day, Bristol Deaf Club (an organisation not connected to the CDS, but attended by many CDS staff and the hub for the Bristol Deaf community) announced that it was selling its building to the Elim church
