= Sprachheilschule St. Gallen =

School for deaf and speech-impaired children in St. Gallen, Switzerland

Coordinates: 47.4247°N 9.3626°E

- St. Gallen; Switzerland

Information
- Former names: "Taubstummenanstalt St. Gallen" (1859–1983)
- Type: Private special school with boarding facilities
- Established: 1859
- Founder: St. Gallischer Hilfsverein für die Bildung taubstummer Kinder
- Oversight: St. Gallischer Verein für Hören, Sprache und Kommunikation

The Sprachheilschool St. Gallen ("St. Gallen speech therapy school"), founded in 1859 as the Taubstummenanstalt St. Gallen ("St. Gallen institute for deaf-mutes"), is a private special school in St. Gallen, Switzerland, for deaf, hard-of-hearing, and speech-impaired children. It was established by the St. Gallischer Hilfsverein für die Bildung taubstummer Kinder, took on speech therapy from 1937, and was renamed in 1983.

== Foundation and organization ==
The association was created on the initiative of Babette Steinmann, who had founded a women's association some years earlier for the support of poor deaf children considered capable of education. A governing committee of three women and four men supervised the institute, handling staffing, boarding fees, and admissions, and assessing whether applicants were suited to training. From 1897 the canton of St. Gallen had a permanent delegate on the committee, which was enlarged to nine members, three of them women, under the revised statutes of 1934.

Shortly after the institute opened in 1859 on the outskirts of St. Gallen, the association bought the former Kurzenburg restaurant on the Rosenberg, which housed it thereafter. Georg Friedrich Erhardt, a German teacher specializing in the education of deaf people, was its first director, and further teachers were soon engaged as pupil numbers grew. The first women educators began work in the boarding section in 1945, relieving the teaching staff of supervising pupils outside lesson hours.

== Pupils and funding ==
Children from all parts of eastern Switzerland could attend, though those from the canton of St. Gallen were given priority. Applicants had to be between eight and twelve years old on entry, and schooling lasted six or seven years; the opening of a kindergarten in 1940 lowered the admission age to five and lengthened the course. Until the 1980s most children lived in the boarding section.

In its early years the institute was financed almost entirely by donations and bequests and by boarding fees paid by parents. Cantonal subsidies grew during the first half of the 20th century and were written into the St. Gallen law on teachers' salaries that came into force in 1947. From 1960 the disability insurance covered a large part of the boarding costs, relieving parents.

Beginning with ten pupils, the institute could take up to 48 children, both Catholic and Reformed, after its move, and a new building inaugurated in 1899 met the strong demand. Numbers rose steadily over the following 30 years to a maximum of about 118 boarders around 1930, then fell by some 40 per cent by 1937, as the number of deaf children in Switzerland declined rapidly from the mid-1930s, chiefly owing to the iodisation of table salt introduced in 1922. Faced with a trend that called the existence of such institutions across the country into question, the institute responded in 1937 by creating the first speech therapy school in Switzerland, admitting children with speech disorders alongside those who were deaf or hard of hearing. The former soon formed the majority, though they stayed only briefly.

== Teaching methods ==
The institute practised oralism, which aimed to teach spoken language to deaf children through lip reading and the articulation of sounds, requiring pupils to conform to the linguistic norm of the hearing majority. To enforce speech, boarders who used sign language were punished: their hands were crossed behind their backs or placed in cardboard tubes, and blows to the hands were frequent. The teaching itself could be violent or violate the children's physical integrity, as when teachers touched pupils' faces to make them articulate correctly. The use of technical aids in learning spoken language became general with the appearance of hearing aids in the 1950s and 1960s. Sign language was regarded as an obstacle: it was not taught, deaf children were not allowed to use it in their free time, and parents were urged to give it up. The institute continued to favor purely oral teaching even as other Swiss schools began to abandon the method in the 1980s and introduce gestural and visual elements.

Vocational integration after schooling, supervised from 1942 by a dedicated service within the institute, was the argument it advanced to justify teaching spoken language and the strong pressure to adapt that this placed on deaf young people. The language barrier nonetheless blocked access to many occupations, and admission to higher education remained limited to rare cases.

== Renaming and later development ==
The institution, which included a boarding section for deaf, hard-of-hearing, and speech-impaired people, was renamed Sprachheilschule St. Gallen in 1983, in response to growing criticism of the term taubstumm ("deaf-mute") as discriminatory by those concerned and their families. With the opening of a cochlear implant centre in 1995, the school specialized in supporting children with electronic hearing devices, and it began, like other special schools, to work toward integrating pupils into mainstream education.

By 2026 most of the children attending had language-acquisition disorders, while those with a hearing impairment formed only a minority, and the school had three residential groups of eight or nine children each.

Since 2024 the umbrella organization has been called the St. Gallischer Verein für Hören, Sprache und Kommunikation.

== Historical reappraisal ==
As in many other countries, deaf people campaigned from the 1980s against the prohibition of sign language and their marginalization in society. In the 2010s they called for work to document their experiences in Swiss speech therapy schools. The resulting studies attested to the violence and violations of physical integrity that children and adolescents faced, including at the "Taubstummenanstalt St. Gallen". The restrictions on freedom of communication and the resulting discrimination—termed audism in research—deeply impeded the individual development of people with hearing impairments. Under pressure from the Swiss Federation of the Deaf, the remaining special schools and the Schweizerischer Hörbehindertenverband (Sonos) acknowledged in a joint declaration in 2021 the harmful effects of banning sign language for deaf people. On its 165th anniversary in 2024, the Sprachheilschule St. Gallen came out in favour of recognizing the right to sign language.

== Bibliography ==
- H. Ammann, 80 Jahre Taubstummenanstalt St. Gallen – 1859–1939, 1939
- Taubstummenanstalt und Sprachheilschule St. Gallen, ed., Hundert Jahre Taubstummenanstalt St. Gallen, 1859–1959, 1959
- B. Schlegel et al., eds., 125 Jahre Sprachheilschule St. Gallen. Ehemals Taubstummen- und Sprachheilschule, 1984
- J. Gstrein, Weisst du noch wie es früher war... mit den "Strafen". Eine Befragung von Gehörlosen über ihre Erlebnisse zur Sozialisation im Gehörloseninternat, 1999
- V. Blaser, M. Ruoss, "'Gitter am Kopf und Loch im Herzen'. Lebenswelten ehemaliger Schüler und Schülerinnen der Taubstummenanstalt St. Gallen, 1930er bis 1950er Jahre", in M. Schmidt, A. Werner, eds., Zwischen Fremdbestimmung und Autonomie, 2019, 83–119
- V. Blaser, "Entstummen" und "verkehrsfähig" machen: Die Berufseingliederung gehörloser Frauen und Männer an der Taubstummenanstalt und Sprachheilschule St. Gallen (1930er–1950er Jahre), 2020
- R. Hesse, A. Canonica et al., Aus erster Hand. Gehörlose, Gebärdensprache und Gehörlosenpädagogik in der Schweiz im 19. und 20. Jahrhundert, 2020
- S. Matter, V. Blaser, "Die Wirkungsmacht des Audismus und der Kampf um die Anerkennung der Gebärdensprachen", in C. Häfeli, M. Lengwiler, M. Vogel Campanello, eds., Zwischen Schutz und Zwang. Normen und Praktiken im Wandel der Zeit, 2024, 139–153
- V. Blaser, Expertise herausfordern – Partizipation erkämpfen. Gehörlosigkeit, Bildung und Beruf in der Deutschschweiz, 1980er und 1990er Jahre, doctoral thesis, University of Bern, 2025

=== Sources ===
- E. Sutermeister, ed., Quellenbuch zur Geschichte des schweizerischen Taubstummenwesens, 2 vols., 1929

=== Archives ===
- Staatsarchiv St. Gallen, Sprachheilschule St. Gallen
