= Terry Riley (broadcaster) =

British deaf rights activist and broadcaster (1944–2019)

Terence Riley (1944-2019) was a British deaf rights activist and broadcaster. He was Deaf and a British Sign Language user.

== Early life ==
Riley was born in Manchester in 1944 to Deaf parents, Mary and Terence (Snr), of Roman Catholic background. He was born hearing, but lost most of his hearing due to mastoiditis. His parents were assiduous members of the local Deaf club and they took him along since he was one week old. When Riley was 15, he became secretary of Manchester Deaf Centre.

Riley working life started working on the cheese counter at Seymour Mead grocers, then as a delivery boy, as a butcher and finally for the gas board.

== Broadcasting activity ==
With the help of Doug Alker, Riley joined the BBC's Deaf magazine programme See Hear in 1993 as a researcher, to director, to producer and finally, in 2002, to Series Editor, the first Deaf person to hold that position. In 2008 he left the BBC to become the first Chief Executive of the British Sign Language Broadcasting Trust, which commissions and funds programmes, series and movies in British Sign Language.

== Deaf activism ==
Riley was involved with the British Deaf Association (BDA) for fifty years, serving at various times as a Branch Secretary, Branch Chairman, Area Council Chair, a member of the Executive Council, and for three consecutive terms as Chair of the BDA, from 2008 to 2018.

He received the BDA Medal of Honour in 2000. To the end of his life he lobbied for the legal recognition of British Sign Language in the UK.

As well as campaigning nationally, Riley served as vice-president of the European Union of the Deaf from 1991 to 1994, and as a board member from 2001 to 2005. From 2011 to 2019, he served on the Board of the World Federation of the Deaf, and was awarded the title of Honorary Board member at the XX General Assembly of the World Federation of the Deaf in July 2019.

== Personal life ==
Riley was married to Angela and spent the later part of his life in Kent.

Riley was passionate about sport and, while working for BBS See hear, helped to push the case for Deaf Sport in the UK by broadcasting Deaf Sport events and issues. He was chosen to chair the Deaf Sports Forum meeting in 2001 which led to the setting up of the Deaf Sports Strategy Group (DSSG). Riley was a supporter of Cheadle Town FC and Manchester City FC.

In 2011, Riley was awarded the Honorary Degree of Doctor of Arts by the University of Wolverhampton.

In June 2014, he was awarded an OBE for services to broadcasting and the Deaf community.
