= Teresa Blankmeyer Burke =

American philosopher

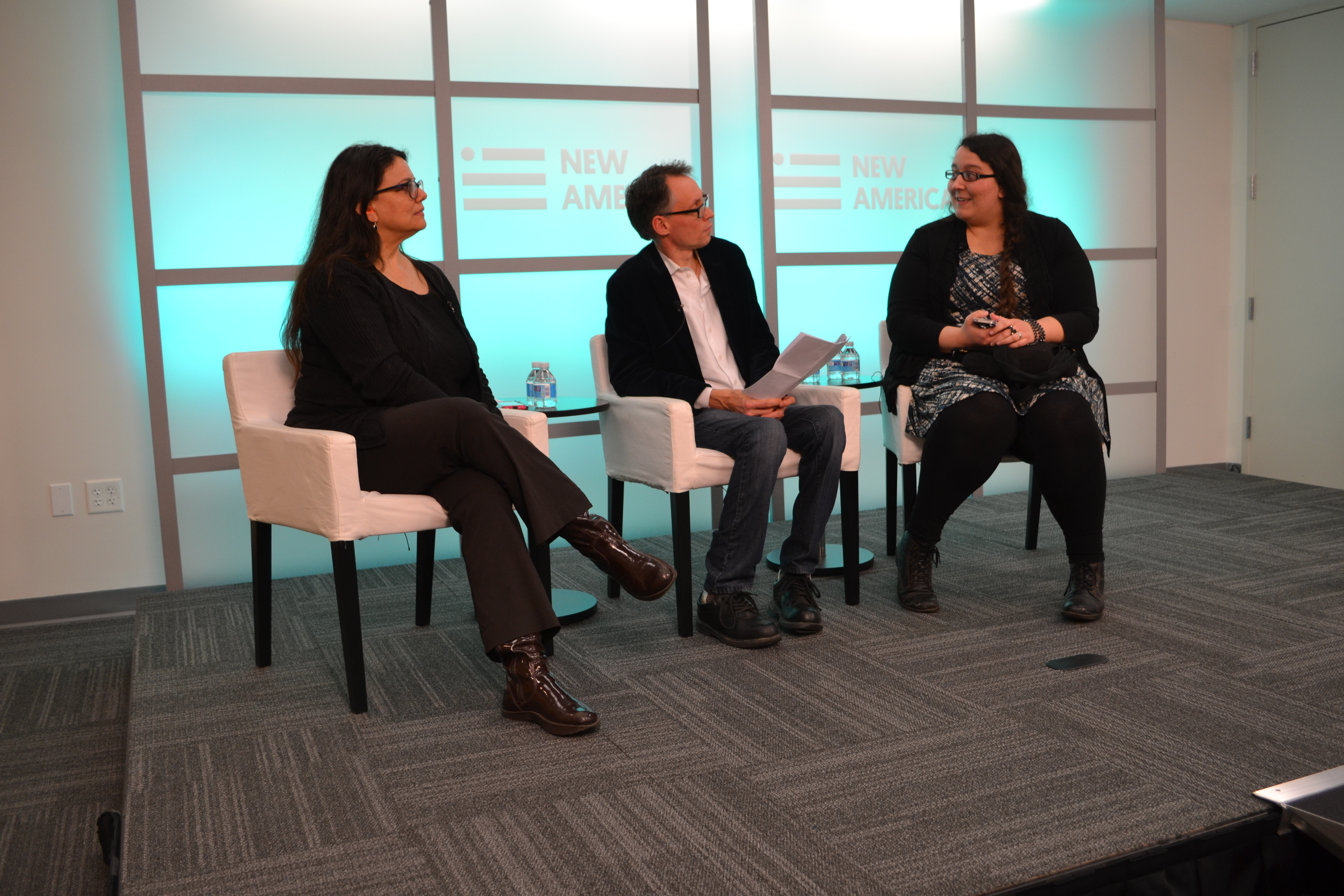
- Teresa Blankmeyer Burke, Lawrence Carter-Long (National Council on Disability), Julia Bascom in 2015

Education
- Education: Mills College, University of New Mexico

Philosophical work
- Institutions: Gallaudet University, University of New Mexico
- Main interests: Deaf philosophy, virtue ethics, moral justification, bioethics

Teresa Blankmeyer Burke is a Professor of Philosophy at Gallaudet University. She is the first signing deaf woman to receive a PhD in philosophy in the world, as well as the first deaf person to receive a PhD in philosophy at the University of New Mexico.

Her work primarily focuses on deaf philosophy (the intersection of philosophy and Deaf studies) and bioethics. Her primary interests lay in areas such as virtue ethics, moral justification, and the ethics of sign-language interpreting. Since the use of American Sign Language to discuss topics in philosophy is a relatively new development, Burke grappled with the lack of an existing philosophical lexicon in ASL and the philosophical considerations as to what the development of that lexicon could or should look like.

== Education and career ==
During Burke's early education, she was mainstreamed, and only received significant exposure to sign language when she reached post-secondary education. Burke received a bachelor's degree in Biology, Ethics, and Society from Mills College in 1993. During her time at Mills, Burke led a student movement aimed at increasing access to ADA accommodations, including filing a complaint with the Department of Justice towards this goal. She went on to obtain master's and doctoral degrees in philosophy from the University of New Mexico in 2003 and 2011, respectively. Burke was the first signing Deaf student to receive a doctorate degree in philosophy, and the University of New Mexico did not have appropriate academic accommodations for deaf doctoral students in place when she started pursuing her degree. When she first started at UNM, Burke was paired with a signing interpreter who had just graduated from an interpreter training program, who had never taken any philosophy coursework, and who was not certified. Burke had to fight in order to receive appropriate accommodations (including an appropriately trained interpreter), including filing complaints with higher administrators at UNM and having to threaten to file a complaint with the Department of Justice. (Many of Burke's initial interpreters lacked any philosophy-specific subject knowledge; one of Burke's interpreters signed "Greek word" every time they heard a word they didn't understand and assumed was Greek during a lecture given by Alexander Nehamas.)

Burke served as an instructor at Gallaudet from 2005 to 2011, before receiving an appointment as Assistant Professor of Philosophy. Besides her academic appointments, Burke has served in a variety of other roles. Burke is the current chair of the U.S. National Association of the Deaf's Subcommittee on Bioethics and is also a member of the American Philosophical Association's Inclusiveness Committee, the American Society for Bioethics and Humanities Task Force on Disability, and the World Federation of the Deaf Bioethics Committee.

== Research areas ==
Burke's primary research focus has been Deaf philosophy; the intersection of philosophy and Deaf studies. Within this realm, she has worked on topics such as the ethics of sign-language interpreting, deaf gain through the lens of intrinsic and instrumental value, moral justification regarding the use of technology to intentionally bear deaf children, and deaf liberty. Since Burke actively teaches and 'does' philosophy using American Sign Language, she has also worked extensively both on the development of a more thorough philosophical lexicon for ASL, and on philosophical questions about what linguistic features should signal particular philosophical moves - quite literally, what the act of doing philosophy looks like. She is also an expert on the medicalization of deafness and "curing" deafness.

== Publications ==
Burke has published a number of refereed papers and book chapters. Burke also makes an active effort to contribute to public philosophy within the signing Deaf community by facilitating online discussions about issues of ethics in both English and ASL, as well as being an active blogger.
