= Ceil Lucas =

American linguist

- Born: March 19, 1951 (age 75)
- Other name: Ceil Kovac
- Occupation: Professor of Linguistics
- Known for: Sign language linguistics, sociolinguistic variation in American Sign Language
- Title: Professor Emerita

Academic background
- Education: Whitman College; University of Texas, Austin; Georgetown University
- Thesis: Children's acquisition of variable features (1980)

Academic work
- Discipline: Linguist
- Sub-discipline: Sociolinguistics, Linguistic variation, Sign language
- Institutions: Gallaudet University

Ceil (Kovac) Lucas (born March 19, 1951) is an American linguist and a professor emerita of Gallaudet University, best known for her research on American Sign Language.

== Early life and education ==
Lucas was born in the United States but raised from ages five through twenty-one in Guatemala City and in Rome, Italy.

Lucas studied at Whitman College in Walla Walla, Washington, and received her BA in French and art history. Later, she earned her M.S. and PhD (1980) in linguistics from Georgetown University. (She also holds an M.A. from the University of Texas at Austin.)

== Career ==
In 1973, Lucas started teaching Italian and continues to do so.

Lucas began teaching at Gallaudet University in 1981 and, alongside Robert Johnson and Scott Liddell, was one of the inaugural faculty to teach in the university's new linguistics graduate program. Lucas was a professor in the Department of Linguistics at Gallaudet University until her retirement in 2014.

During her tenure at Gallaudet, Lucas served as principal investigator on two research projects in the field of sign language linguistics. The first of these was the large-scale project Sociolinguistic Variation In ASL (funded by the National Science Foundation Grant Numbers: SBR 9310116, SBR 9709522).The results of this study are summarized in the book Sociolinguistic Variation In ASL (Lucas et al. 2001). (Results of its pilot study are discussed in the introductory chapter of Sociolinguistics in Deaf Communities (Lucas 1995).) The second project became titled The History and Structure of Black ASL (funded by The Spencer Foundation and NSF, Grant Numbers: BCS-0813736, DRL-0936085). The results of this study are summarized in the book The Hidden Treasure of Black ASL: Its History and Structure (McCaskill et al. 2011).

== Honors ==
Lucas was editor of Sign Language Studies at Gallaudet University Press from 2009 to 2021.

In 2022, Lucas was one of the recipients of the LSA's Linguistics, Language and the Public award. In 2023, she was inducted as a Fellow of the Linguistic Society of America.

== Bibliography ==
- Kovac, Ceil. 1980. Children’s Acquisition of Variable Features. PhD dissertation, Georgetown University.
- Lucas, Ceil (ed.). 1990. Sign Language Research: Theoretical Issues. Washington, D.C.: Gallaudet University Press.
- Lucas, Ceil, and Clayton Valli. 1992. Language Contact in the American Deaf Community. Academic Press.
- Lucas, Ceil (ed.). 1995. Sociolinguistics in Deaf Communities . Washington, D.C.: Gallaudet University Press. ISBN 978-1-56368-345-9, ISSN 1080-5494.
- Lucas, Ceil (ed.). 1996. Multicultural Aspects of Sociolinguistics in Deaf Communities . Washington, D.C.: Gallaudet University Press. ISBN 978-1-56368-108-0.
- Lucas, Ceil (ed.). 1998. Pinky Extension and Eye Gaze: Language Use in Deaf Communities . Washington, D.C.: Gallaudet University Press. ISBN 978-1-56368-070-0, ISSN 1080-5494.
- Lucas, Ceil, Robert Bayley, and Clayton Valli. 2001. Sociolinguistic Variation in American Sign Language . Washington, D.C.: Gallaudet University Press. ISBN 978-1-56368-113-4, ISSN 1080-5494.
- Lucas, Ceil (ed.). 2001. The Sociolinguistics of Sign Languages. Cambridge University Press.
- Lucas, Ceil, Robert Bayley, and Clayton Valli. 2003. What's Your Sign for Pizza?: An Introduction to Variation in American Sign Language . Washington, D.C.: Gallaudet University Press. ISBN 978-1-56368-144-8.
- Lucas, Ceil (ed.). 2002. Turn-Taking, Fingerspelling, and Contact in Signed Languages . Washington, D.C.: Gallaudet University Press. ISBN 978-1-56368-128-8, ISSN 1080-5494.
- Lucas, Ceil (ed.). 2003. Language and the Law in Deaf Communities . Washington, D.C.: Gallaudet University Press. ISBN 978-1-56368-317-6.
- Valli, Clayton, Ceil Lucas, Kristin J. Mulrooney, and Miako N.P. Rankin. 2011. Linguistics of American Sign Language: An Introduction . 5th edition. Washington, D.C.: Gallaudet University Press. ISBN 978-1-56368-507-1.
- McCaskill, Carolyn, Ceil Lucas, Robert Bayley, and Joseph Hill. 2011. The Hidden Treasure of Black ASL: Its History and Structure . Washington, D.C.: Gallaudet University Press. ISBN 978-1-56368-489-0.
- Bayley, Robert, Richard Cameron, and Ceil Lucas. 2013. The Oxford Handbook of Sociolinguistics. Oxford University Press.
- Schembri, Adam C., and Ceil Lucas. 2015. Sociolinguistics and Deaf Communities. Cambridge University Press.
