= Centre for Deaf Studies, Dublin =

The Centre for Deaf Studies is part of the School of Linguistic, Speech and Communication Sciences, Trinity College Dublin and is the only university offering Deaf studies related courses on the island of Ireland.

The Centre originally offered a range of two-year full-time Diploma courses in (i) ISL Teaching, (ii) ISL/English Interpreting and (iii) Deaf Studies. Since 2009, a four-year honors Bachelor in Deaf Studies has been running. Students follow a common two-year programme, specializing in Deaf Studies or Interpreting or Teaching in the sophister years (third and fourth).

== History ==
Established in 2001, following a decade of campaigning by the Irish Deaf Society, the Centre for Deaf Studies was originally located at Waterloo Lane, Dublin 4. By 2003, more space was needed and the Centre moved to the first floor of St. Vincent's Centre for the Deaf, Drumcondra, Dublin 9, where it remained until 2010. In autumn 2010, the Centre moved to its new home at 7-9 Leinster Street South, a College owned premises.

The core faculty at the Centre for Deaf Studies are: Dr. John Bosco Conama, Ms. Carmel Grehan, Prof. Lorraine Leeson, Ms. Teresa Lynch, Mr. Patrick A. Matthews and Dr. Sarah Sheridan.

Part-time/occasional lecturers who have taught at the Centre for Deaf Studies over the years include:

- Ms. Deirdre Byrne-Dunne
- Ms. Tracey Daly
- Mr. Senan Dunne
- Ms. Dawn Duffin
- Dr. Colin Flynn
- Ms. Alvean Jones
- Ms. Susan Foley-Cave
- Mr. Cormac Leonard
- Mr. Brian Lynch
- Ms. Patricia Lynch (RIP)
- Dr. Patrick McDonnell
- Ms. Wendy Murray Snr.
- Ms. Wendy Murray Jnr.
- Dr. Irene Murtagh
- Ms. Evelyn Nolan-Conry (RIP)
- Dr. Fergus O'Dwyer
- Ms. Caitriona O'Brien
- Ms. Laura Sadlier (RIP)
- Ms. Helena Saunders
- Mr. Haaris Sheikh
- Mr. Robert Smith
- Ms. Gudny Thorvaldsdottir
- Ms. Nora Ungar

The Centre for Deaf Studies is part of the Centre for Language and Communication Studies (CLCS) at Trinity College Dublin (TCD). Staff from CLCS and the Department of Clinical Speech and Language Studies (CSLS), both within the School of Linguistic, Speech and Communication Sciences, contribute to teaching.

Colleagues from the School who have contributed to teaching over the years include:

Dr. Vania Aguiar, Mr. Brian Conry, Dr. Jeffrey Kallen, Prof. David Little, Dr. Breffni O'Rourke, Dr. Heath Rose, Prof. David Singleton, Dr. Irene Walsh.

== Research ==
The Centre has engaged in a wide range of research activity to date, working to fulfill its remit of developing the discipline of Deaf Studies in Ireland. Work includes the development of the Signs of Ireland corpus, a digital multimodal corpus annotated in ELAN. The Signs of Ireland corpus is used in teaching and learning at the Centre and was the basis for Lorraine Leeson and John Saeed's volume describing the linguistic and sociolinguistic situation of Irish Sign Language (Edinburgh University Press, 2012) and several postgraduate dissertations.

CDS staff (Leeson, Matthews, Sheridan) have also built an Irish Sign Language as a second language acquisition corpus (SLAC), which staff and students are working to annotate. The SLAC-ISL corpus is a parallel corpus, built in collaboration with colleagues at Stockholm University (Scrönström, Mesch). This is one of the first L2 sign language corpus projects in the world.

Other work has centered on the application of the Common European Framework of Reference for Languages to ISL teaching and assessment, the assessment of interpreters, deaf education, interpreters in educational contexts, interpreters in medical contexts, interpreters in mental health settings, interpreter career trajectories, the psychology of L2-M2 learners, the context of deaf children acquiring ISL at home, and work on deaf peoples’ access to employment, etc.

The Centre is home to an Applied Sign Linguistics lab, with a cohort of PhD and masters by research candidates working with classic Grounded Theory methodology. Academics have also supported students working on descriptive, functional and cognitive linguistic driven analyses of sign languages.

The Laura Sadlier Freshman Prize and the Laura Sadlier Sophister Award were officially founded in 2014 in recognition of the outstanding contributions made to the Centre for Deaf Studies by Laura Sadlier. These prizes will be presented annually to Junior Freshman students from the Centre for Deaf Studies who have demonstrated significant improvement in ISL proficiency and/or cultural engagement with the Deaf Community and to Senior Sophister students from the Centre for Deaf Studies. The recipient of this award will have demonstrated academic achievement, collegiality and engagement with the Deaf Community during the course of their studies.

== Staff ==
- Director: Dr. John Bosco Conama, Assistant Professor
- Mr. Patrick A. Matthews, Assistant Professor & Coordinator - Bachelor in Deaf Studies
- Professor Lorraine Leeson
- Ms. Carmel Grehan, Assistant Professor
- Ms. Teresa Lynch, Assistant Professor
- Ms. Sarah Sheridan, Assistant Professor
- Mr. Haaris Sheikh, Adjunct Assistant Professor and Doctoral Candidate
- Prof. Terry Janzen, Visiting Professor, University of Manitoba, Canada.
