= Rikki Poynter =

German deaf YouTuber and activist

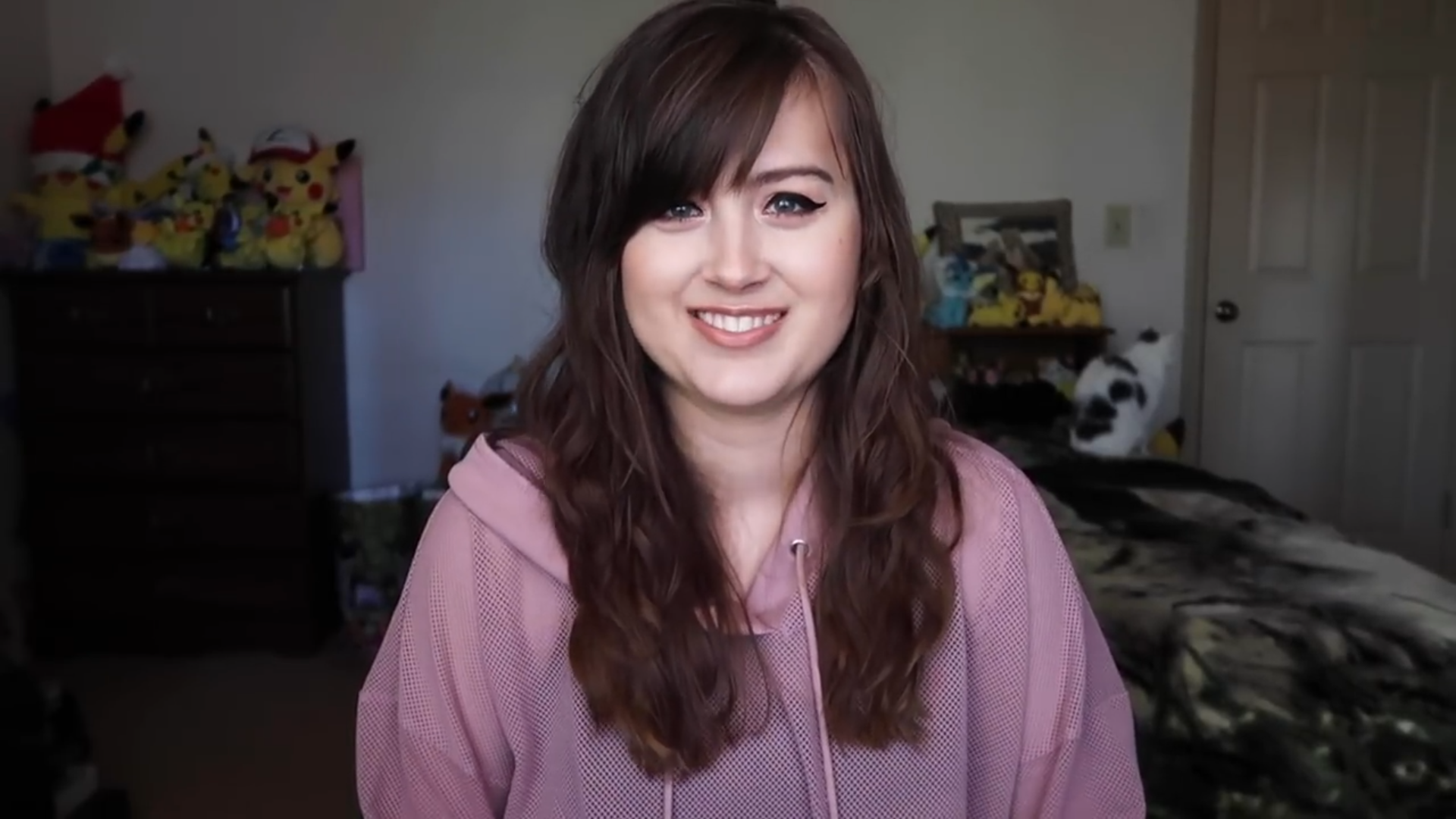
- Poynter in 2019
- Born: July 16, 1991 (age 35); Kirchheimbolanden, Germany
- Occupation: Deaf activist

YouTube information
- Channel: rikkipoynter
- Years active: 2010–present
- Genres: Lifestyle; vlogs; beauty; deaf; closed captioning
- Subscribers: 99 thousand
- Views: 12,786,703
- Last updated: 24 September 2026

Rikki Poynter (born July 16, 1991) is a deaf YouTuber and activist. She began as a beauty vlogger and is now a lifestyle vlogger with a focus on deaf awareness, accessibility, and the importance of closed captioning.

== Background ==
Poynter was first diagnosed with hearing loss at age 11, genetically inherited from a deaf parent. She describes her deafness as severe in her right ear and moderate to severe in her left ear. She was raised orally under a German deaf mother and an American hearing father in a mainstream environment and attended mainstream schools from K-12, which she described as difficult due to a lack of accommodation. In her early 20s, Poynter became more involved in the Deaf community and began to learn American Sign Language (ASL) in 2015.

== YouTube channel ==
Poynter created her YouTube channel soon after high school when she started uploading makeup tutorials to her YouTube channel RikkiPoynter. She continued creating beauty videos for the next four years, but then decided to use her platform to spread awareness on Deaf issues because she wanted to create content that was beneficial and meaningful.

In 2014, Poynter uploaded her first video speaking about her deafness. She rebranded her YouTube channel, which now covers a variety of topics relating to Deaf culture, Deaf issues, closed captioning, and other lifestyle topics. In her videos, Poynter shares her own personal stories about being Deaf. Her videos are described as using humor and snark to highlight challenges facing the deaf/Deaf/Hard of Hearing (d/Deaf/HoH) community and to debunk misconceptions.

Her YouTube channel currently has over 91,500 subscribers and a combined video view count of over 6.8 million across 608 videos. Her most popular video, "Sh*t Hearing People Say (Things You Don't Say to Deaf & Hard of Hearing)" has over 500,000 views.

Through YouTube and social media, Poynter has been able to find a supportive community that has also helped push for Deaf rights and better closed captioning on YouTube.

== Activism ==
As an online activist, Poynter advocates for improved closed captioning on YouTube, raises awareness against audism, and speaks about challenges that face the d/Deaf/HoH community. She also advocates for the inclusion of intersectionality- specifically in relation to Deafness and disability- in feminism.

=== Closed captioning awareness ===
Poynter's main focus is to fight for a higher quantity and quality of closed captioning on YouTube videos. According to Poynter, YouTube's automatically generated closed captions are often inaccurate, do not make sense in the context of the video, and/or contain profanity or inappropriate words. Because of this, Poynter encourages YouTube creators to manually enter their own closed captions.

In 2014, Poynter began making videos about this issue and advocating it on her social media platforms. Her goals are to teach YouTubers about the importance of closed captions and to increase the number of creators that caption their content. Her efforts include sending emails and handwritten letters to popular YouTube stars to tell them about the challenges of the lack of captions for the Deaf community on YouTube and to give information on how they can caption their videos. She has also contacted YouTube itself regarding improving their automatic captioning system.

Her efforts have attracted attention by mainstream media, including ABC News, BBC News, and Huffington Post. It has also gotten the attention of high-profile YouTubers such as Laci Green, Tyler Oakley, and Tanya Burr. In January 2015, Oakley released a video saying that he has captioned all of his videos and encouraged other YouTubers to do the same, citing Poynter and her video "Deaf Accessibility on YouTube" as one of the reasons he was motivated to do so. Poynter states that although there is often a lack of response and action from those that she has contacted, Closed captioning awareness is improving.

In September 2016, Poynter launched the #NoMoreCraptions campaign to fight against poor closed captioning, including ones that are positioned incorrectly, that lack proper grammar and punctuation, and that include unnecessary comments and/or jokes. The video and campaign explained how to caption videos with Federal Communications Commission guidelines, called on viewers to contact YouTubers they watch to improve or include captions, and invited other YouTubers to make their own #NoMoreCraptions videos. Two days after the campaign began, there were 47 #NoMoreCraptions videos made by other YouTubers in support of the initiative.

=== Deaf Poynters ===
Poynter created a website called 'Deaf Poynters ', which is focused on spreading Deaf awareness and advocating for Deaf rights. The website offers information on Deaf culture through articles written by the d/Deaf/HoH community, including personal stories. Other articles posted to the site include history and facts to educate those that are unfamiliar with the background of deafness.

The Deaf Poynters website sells merchandise, including stickers, pins, buttons, and prints that include Rikki's commonly used hashtags and slogans such as, #deaftalent, #nomorecraptions, and "Do I look deaf now?". Through the Deaf Poynters website, viewers have the opportunity to donate to Rikki through platforms including, Patreon, and Amazon Wishlist.

=== Public engagements ===
In addition to online advocacy, Poynter speaks about Deaf issues and closed captioning at events. At VidCon 2015, Poynter led a workshop called "Lights, Camera, Caption!" for creators to learn about Deaf culture, the importance of closed captioning, and how to do caption content. In 2016, she led the workshop again, and also participated on the panel Disabilities on YouTube. At Buffer Festival, she was part of the Science and Education panel in 2015, and the Women on YouTube panel in 2016. In 2015, Poynter also gave a talk at Lycoming College about accessibility and deaf issues such as captioning, sign language access and police brutality.

=== Other involvement ===
Poynter formerly wrote articles for DTV News, a news channel with accessible content for the d/Deaf/HoH community.

She is the social media specialist and blogger for Deaf Women in Film, a resource that supports deaf women in the film industry.

Poynter also actively supports movements such as #DeafTalent, which aims to acknowledge Deaf individuals working in the media industry and stop the trend of casting hearing actors in Deaf roles.

She also contributes video content to Ai-Media, a service that provides access to the world's content through live captioning, closed captions, transcripts and audio description.
