= Arthur Verney =

British Deaf rights campaigner and activist

Arthur Verney (1943–2013) was a British Deaf and disability rights campaigner and activist.

== Early life and education ==
Verney was born in Birmingham. He had spina bifida. As a hearing child of Deaf parents (CODA), his first language was British Sign Language.

After attending Moseley Grammar school, Verney trained as a Deaf Welfare officer. He then studied Social Work at Liverpool Polytechnic (1964–66). In 1970, Verney took up a position as the first director of the course in social work with deaf people at the North London Polytechnic and in 1975 he became social work services officer at the Welsh Office.

== Deaf and disability rights activist ==
In 1980, Verney became general secretary of the British Deaf Association (BDA). At the time, it was a charity mostly run by hearing people. Verney was responsible for transforming it into an organisation led by Deaf people and for the campaigning arm of the association. In 1983, Jock Young, the first Deaf chairman of the association, was elected.

Verney helped to establish a training course at Durham University for Deaf people to become sign language teachers, and in 1982 he established what would become the Sign Language week, aimed at promoting the awareness and use of British Sign Language. In 1989 the BDA had more than one million pound in income for the first time and that was much due to his work.

Verney was one of the promoters, together with Jock Young, of the European Union of the Deaf, which was launched in 1985 as the European Community Regional Secretariat, bringing together Deaf associations from Germany, the Netherlands and France to work together to empower Deaf people across Europe. Verney became the EUD's executive officer from 1989 to 1992. He also helped founding the European Disability Forum (EDF).

In 1992, following a successful funding application, Verney became European regional officer of Disabled People's International, working alongside disability rights campaigner Rachel Hurst. Among his achievements, he organised a Disabled People's parliament (December 1993), where 440 disabled people took the place of the MEPs and reported to the European Commission in first person, and he ran workshops across Europe on human rights, bioethics, independent living and accessibility. He took also part in the Campaign for Independent Living. He was forced to stand down in 2002 due to ill health.

== Personal life ==
He married Ann Hilder in 1968, and together had a daughter. They divorced in 1990. Verney died on 24 September 2013.
