= Gallaudet University Press =

- Parent company: Gallaudet University
- Status: Active
- Founded: 1980
- Country of origin: United States
- Headquarters location: Washington, D.C.
- Distribution: International, Chicago Distribution Center
- Publication types: Books, ebooks, journals
- Nonfiction topics: Sign languages, Deaf studies, Deaf education, Sign language interpretation, Deaf history, Deaf culture
- Fiction genres: Academic non-fiction, fiction (literature, poetry, memoirs)
- No. of employees: 7
- Official website: gupress.gallaudet.edu

Gallaudet University Press (GUPress) is a publisher that focuses on issues relating to deafness and sign language. It is a part of Gallaudet University in Washington D.C., and was founded in 1980 by the university's board of trustees. The press is a member of the Association of University Presses. The press publishes two quarterly journals: American Annals of the Deaf and Sign Language Studies.

== Mission statement ==
Gallaudet University Press is a vital, self-supporting member of the Gallaudet educational and scholarly community. The mission of the Press is to disseminate knowledge about deaf and hard of hearing people, their languages, their communities, their history, and their education through print and electronic media.

== Series ==
=== The Gallaudet Classics in Deaf Studies Series ===
The series' editor is Kristen C. Harmon. The first volume of this series, published in 1998, was a reprinting of Albert Ballin's book The Deaf Mute Howls; which was originally printed in 1930. The 11th volume of the series is due to be published in June 2018.

=== The Sociolinguistics in Deaf Communities Series ===
The series' editors are Ceil Lucas and Jordan Fenlon. The first volume of this series was published in 1995. The 23rd volume of this series was published in January 2018.

=== The Studies in Interpretation Series ===
The series' editors are Melanie Metzger and Earl Fleetwood. The 16th volume of this series is due to be published in May 2018.

== See also ==
- List of English-language book publishing companies
- List of university presses
