= Deaf philosophy =

Philosophical perspective

Deaf philosophy is an emerging sub-field of philosophy covering bioethics, metaphysics, epistemology, while also including elements of linguistics and existentialism. This field and culture of philosophical discussion arose because of linguistic differences between spoken and signed language.

The field of Deaf Philosophy includes both issues influenced by cultural relations to Deaf identity, what it means to be d/Deaf, along with the practice of philosophical discussion among Deaf scholars. Deaf philosophers themselves typically use American Sign Language to communicate concepts and ideas. Discussion of this topic in written scholarship typically occurs in English.

Prominent philosophers in this sub-field include Teresa Blankmeyer Burke, among others.

== History ==
Within the field of philosophy itself, deaf people have been a topic of discussion since antiquity. The first discussion of deaf people using signed language to communicate with each other occurred in Plato's Cratylus Plato asks:

"Suppose that we had no voice or tongue, and wanted to communicate with one another, should we not, like the deaf and dumb, make signs with the hands and head and the rest of the body?"

These discussions were focused on deafness within the model of disability rather than as a cultural identity. Deaf people holding a specific cultural identity was not an aspect that was present within these early philosophical discussions.

The first development of a sub-field of philosophy that is culturally Deaf in nature started in 2008 with the publication of Bauman's Listening to Phonocentrism with Deaf Eyes: Derrida's Mute Philosophy of (Sign) Language.

== Subfields ==
Deaf philosophy contains numerous intersectional subfields. Those subfields include: metaphysics, epistemology, bioethics, existentialism, among others.

=== Metaphysics ===
Burke covers Deaf Metaphysics in Deaf Identities: Exploring New Frontiers discussing how Deaf people recognize others as Deaf and how Deaf people recognize themselves as such. This field covers what a Deaf identity is, and what makes someone Deaf. Authors, such as Paul, analyze how Deaf people view themselves and their bodies. Paul also questions if Deafness is truly a disability, or if it is simply approached from such a perspective because of social and environmental influences.

=== Epistemology ===
Thomas Holcomb in 2010 covered the topic of Deaf epistemology analyzing epistemology from a Deaf point of view. Discussion on this topic has also taken place among Flemish scholars.

=== Bioethics ===
The field of Deaf bioethics deals with ethical questions such as if it is permissible for a Deaf family to select for deafness in a child. Additionally, the field deals with ethical questions such as what a cure for Deafness would mean for the Deaf community. This has overlap with existentialism.

=== Existentialism ===
Deaf Existentialists deal with numerous questions, one of which is why Deaf people should continue to exist in the face of genetic advancement. Deaf people often are resistant to 'cures' for their condition due to it being a medical identity along with a cultural identity, and a 'cure' could mean an eventual loss of language and culture. Additionally, Deaf Existentialists discuss what the meaning of a Deaf identity is.

== In practice ==
=== In academia ===
Philosophers outside and within the Deaf community will often discuss how best to educate a d/Deaf individual. This falls under bioethics because deafness is both a physical condition but also in many cases a cultural identity. In academia, the question of how to best educate a deaf child is longstanding with sources dating back to 1855.

== See also ==
- Deaf Studies
- Deaf culture
- Deaf education
- Deaf theology
