= Lilian Lawson =

Scottish linguist and activist

Lilian Keddie Lawson, OBE, is a Scottish linguist and activist. She is Deaf and a British Sign Language user.

== Activity ==
She was born in Fife to a hearing family. She was sent to the Donaldson's School for the Deaf in Edinburgh, before attending Mary Hare Grammar School, where she showed her organising skills when she got involved in a number of societies and activities. She was interested in science and studied zoology at the University of Edinburgh in the 1970s. After graduation, she was contacted by Mary Brennan, who at the time was pioneering research in British Sign Language at the Moray House in Edinburgh. Together with Brennan she published groundbreaking research that gave BSL the status of a language.

She then worked for the British Deaf Association as an administrator alongside Paddy Ladd, for 11 years. It was a busy period for the Association. Her husband, Jock Young, was elected in 1985 as the first Deaf chair of the Association. During his tenure, the British Sign Language Dictionary was published, and Princess Diana was the Patron of the association.

In 1992 Lawson moved back to Scotland to work for the Scottish section of the Royal National Institute for Deaf People (RNID), position she held until 2000, when she became the director of the Scottish Association for the Deaf, then just renamed Scottish Council on Deafness (SCoD), role she had for almost 14 years.

In the 2005 New Year Honours Lawson was appointed OBE "For services to Deaf people", and was the first Deaf person in Scotland to receive this honour.

Her campaigning work was key in achieving legal recognition for BSL in Scotland and led to the approval of the BSL Scottish Bill in 2015.

In 2016 she was awarded an honorary doctorate of Letters by Heriot Watt University for her work in the field of research on British Sign Language as a campaigner with the Deaf community. In the same year she was also awarded with the Francis Maginn Award by the BDA, to recognise her work for the Deaf community.

== Selected publications ==
- Lawson, Lilian; McLean, Frankie; O'Neill, Rachel; Wilks, Rob (31 December 2019). "4. Recognising British Sign Language in Scotland". The Legal Recognition of Sign Languages. pp. 67–82. doi:10.21832/9781788924016-006. ISBN 9781788924016. S2CID 242726061.
- Brennan, Mary; Colville, Martin D.; Lawson, Lilian K. (1984). Words in hand : a structural analysis of the signs of British sign language ([2nd] ed.). Edinburgh: Edinburgh BSL Research Project. ISBN 0950975001.
