= American Annals of the Deaf =

Deafness-related academic journal

- Discipline: Deaf studies, deaf education
- Language: English
- Edited by: Peter V. Paul

Publication details
- History: 1847–present
- Publisher: Gallaudet University Press (United States)
- Frequency: Quarterly + 1 reference issue

Standard abbreviations
- ISO 4: Am. Ann. Deaf

Indexing
- CODEN: ANDFAL
- ISSN: 0002-726X (print); 1543-0375 (web)
- LCCN: 15014404
- OCLC no.: 05695496

Links
- Journal homepage; Current issue; Past issues

The American Annals of the Deaf is a peer-reviewed academic journal published quarterly with one annual reference issue. The journal is published by Gallaudet University Press in Washington, D.C. It was first established in 1847 as the American Annals of the Deaf and Dumb. The journal's name was changed in 1886 upon the printing of volume 31, issue 4. The journal has been published continuously since its inception, with the exception of a seven-year interruption from 1861 to 1868 due to the American Civil War.

The journal is "the official organ of the Council of American Instructors of the Deaf (CAID) and the Conference of Educational Administrators of Schools and Programs for the Deaf (CEASD)."

== Editors ==
Editor	Years active
Luzerne Rae	1847–1854
Samuel Porter	1854–1861
None; production ceased for Civil War	1861–1868
Lewellyn Pratt	1868–1870
Edward Allen Fay	1870–1920
Irving S. Fusfeld	1920–1966
Powrie V. Doctor	1948–1968
McCay Vernon	
Peter V. Paul	present
