= Jock Young (deaf rights campaigner) =

British deaf rights campaigner

John "Jock" Young OBE (1926–2005) was a British deaf rights campaigner. He was deaf and a British Sign Language user.

== Early life ==
Jock Young was born in Glasgow and received his education at the Glasgow Institute for the Deaf in Langside. He had ambitions to become an electrical engineer, but after leaving school he was sent for an apprenticeship to a shoe maker and repairer. After completing his apprenticeship, he got a job for the shoe repairing firm Napier's. He then took a job with Singer in Clydebank as a night shift supervisor, and then for Rolls-Royce in Hillington.

Young then took a part-time role as Youth and Community Officer for the Glasgow and West of Scotland Society of the Deaf, and then was hired as Social Work Assistant for the Edinburgh and East of Scotland Society of the Deaf, role he kept until he retired in 1991.

Young was the Honorary Secretary of Scottish Regional Council (SRC) of the British Deaf Association (BDA) from 1969 to 1983.

== Chair of the British Deaf Association ==
In 1983, during the Torquay Congress, Jock Young became Chair of the BDA, the first Deaf person ever to be elected as chair. Murray Holmes (also deaf and Scottish) was elected as vice-chair. Young continued to work in that role until 1992.

During his tenure, the BDA achieved remarkable public recognition. Princess Diana became a dedicated patron of the Association and she committed to learn some British Sign Language. After years of work, in 1993 the Dictionary of British Sign Language was published.

Along with Arthur Verney, Young helped to set up the European Community Regional Secretariat of the World Federation of the Deaf, now known as the European Union of the Deaf. It was launched in 1985, and Young served as Honorary Director until 1991. In 1988 the organisation achieved the recognition of sign languages of the European Community's member states.

== Personal life ==
Young was married to Lilian Lawson, who worked along with him at the British Deaf Association (BDA) during the 80s. Young was a badminton player and a keen member of the Glasgow Deaf Drama Club. He also served on the Glasgow Mission committee.

He was awarded with an OBE in 1992 for his services to the Deaf community.
