= Deaf plus =

Deaf and hard of hearing individuals with additional disabilities

Deaf and hard of hearing individuals with additional disabilities are referred to as "Deaf Plus" or "Deaf+". Deaf children with one or more co-occurring disabilities could also be referred to as hearing loss plus additional disabilities or Deafness and Diversity (D.A.D.). About 40–50% of deaf children experience one or more additional disabilities, with learning disabilities, intellectual disabilities, autism spectrum disorder (ASD), and visual impairments being the four most concomitant disabilities. Approximately 7–8% of deaf children have a learning disability. Deaf plus individuals utilize various language modalities to best fit their communication needs.

== Disabilities ==
=== Hereditary syndromes ===
==== Usher syndrome ====
Usher syndrome is the most common condition that causes both deafness and blindness, accounting for around 50% of hereditary deafblindness. Usher syndrome is caused by gene mutation.

==== CHARGE syndrome ====
CHARGE syndrome is rare, and caused by a genetic disorder. The acronym comes from the features associated with CHARGE syndrome which are as follows: C- coloboma of the eye, H- heart defects, A- atresia of nasal choanae, R- retardation of growth and/or development, G- genital and/or urinary abnormalities, and E- ear abnormalities and deafness.

==== Goldenhar syndrome ====
Goldenhar syndrome is a congenital genetic defect that affects the development of the mandible, ears, soft palette, nose, and lip.

=== Maternal infections ===
Congenital rubella syndrome, Cytomegalovirus, and toxoplasmosis are known to cause deafness or more severe complications in children during pregnancy.

=== Congenital disorders ===
Congenital disorders are defined as a set of conditions present at or before birth and can be caused by genetic make up inherited by their parents, infections during pregnancy, or birth defects.

==== Cerebral palsy ====
Cerebral palsy is one of the most common disabilities that affects motor development, occurring in about 1–4 out of 1,000 children. Out of these children, about 15–25% will have some form of hearing loss, ranging from mild to profound. Deafness and cerebral palsy are considered to be an associative conditions for one another because they commonly co-occur. Both of these disabilities have similar risk factors that cause it, such as premature birth, infections, and genetic abnormalities. Out of those with cerebral palsy, bilateral hearing loss occurs most frequently, but it has been found that those who have unilateral hearing loss tend to have greater severity of hearing loss in the one affected ear. Commonly, Deaf individuals would learn sign language in order to communicate with others; however, due to the motor limitations that come with having cerebral palsy, this may be difficult. Sign language instruction can still be used with assistive technology being a solution to overcome any difficulties with the physical action of signing. Additional methods of communication and language to be introduced to those with cerebral palsy are speech therapy and augmentative and alternative communication (AAC).

==== Down syndrome ====
Around 15-20% of newborns with Down syndrome are also diagnosed with some degree of congenital hearing loss. Children with Down syndrome commonly have glue ear, which can lead to infections in the ear, and may cause hearing loss. Glue ear is a condition in which the middle part of the ear behind the eardrum fills with fluid.

=== Autism spectrum disorder ===
Three percent, or 1 in 59, of deaf children have autism spectrum disorder (ASD). The average age of ASD diagnosis for hearing children is 56 months, but for deaf children the average age is 66.5 months. Overlapping diagnostic factors exist for both hearing loss and autism, which include: language delays, difficulty with language functioning, delayed theory of mind, failure to respond to name (auditory), and pragmatic language difficulties. Language difficulties can differ due to the modality of sign languages compared to spoken languages: one study found that native signing autistic children did not reverse pronouns, but another study found autistic signers were more likely to produce signs with reversed palm orientation, meaning they sign it the way they view it being signed to them. Co-occurring medical concerns for children with ASD include intellectual disabilities in 50–75%, seizures in 25–30%, sleep disturbances, gastrointestinal difficulties in 16–85%, and pica eating disorder.

=== Sensory disabilities ===
==== Deafblindness ====
Deafblindness is a condition that can be either congenital or acquired. 87% of deafblind children and youth have at least one additional disability, with 43% having four or more disabilities. 50% of deafblindness is due to Usher syndrome.

=== Learning disabilities ===
Deaf and hard of hearing individuals who also have learning disabilities tend to be diagnosed later in life due to the misconception that the learning difficulties they face are due to their hearing loss. When diagnosing a learning disability in an individual with hearing loss, it is important to differentiate if the achievement difficulties are due to a perception or processing problem. Many of the causes of hearing loss overlap with the causes of the development of learning disabilities, such as anoxia, prematurity, and more, making them more likely to co-occur. The language delay caused by learning disabilities can be reduced through early educational intervention, but hearing impairment makes this process difficult and rather further promotes language delay.

==== Dyslexia ====
10% of deaf individuals are believed to have dyslexia, which equates to about 25% of dyslexic individuals. For those with mild to moderate hearing loss, reading difficulties become enhanced in classrooms with background noise since it enhances their difficulties with perceiving speech sounds. Both dyslexia and hearing loss affect verbal processing in spoken languages; however, dyslexia is not limited to phonological processing issues. Dyslexia can also include underlying visual and cognitive components, which will make reading acquisition even more difficult for those with hearing loss.

One way to combat this difficulty with hearing loss and learning disabilities is with a hearing aid or cochlear implant since it will allow for them to combat any auditory issues with their learning disability, but may not be effective if their disability is caused by other factors such as visual components.

=== Other health impairments (OHI) ===
==== Attention deficit hyperactivity disorder ====
The general population of children with attention deficit hyperactivity disorder (ADHD) is estimated to be 7.2 percent, however the prevalence of deaf children ranges from 3.5 to 38.7 percent. Some researchers have speculated the inattention, impulsivity, and hyperactivity associated with ADHD in deaf children could just be an adaptive strategy to access information in auditory based environment.

== Language ==
Deaf plus individuals utilize a variety of language options such as spoken language, signed language, and Augmentative and Alternative Communication (AAC). Deaf plus individuals may also utilize nonsymbolic expression such as facial expressions, gestures, and body movements.

According to ongoing tracking in metro Atlanta, the most common developmental disability to co-occur with hearing loss is intellectual disability (23%), followed by cerebral palsy (10%), autism spectrum disorder (7%), and/or vision impairment (5%). Hearing loss may also be related to a number of syndromes. A study from Gallaudet research Institute from 1999 to 2012 has shown Deaf schools across states had 40–50 percent of students with additional disabilities.

In 2015, 264 teachers of Deaf students reported they did not receive disability specific training for attention deficit hyperactivity disorder/attention deficit disorder (35%), autism spectrum disorder (73%), emotional behavior disorder (58%), intellectual disability (51%), learning disability (37%), and visual impairment (61%).
