= Deaf studies =

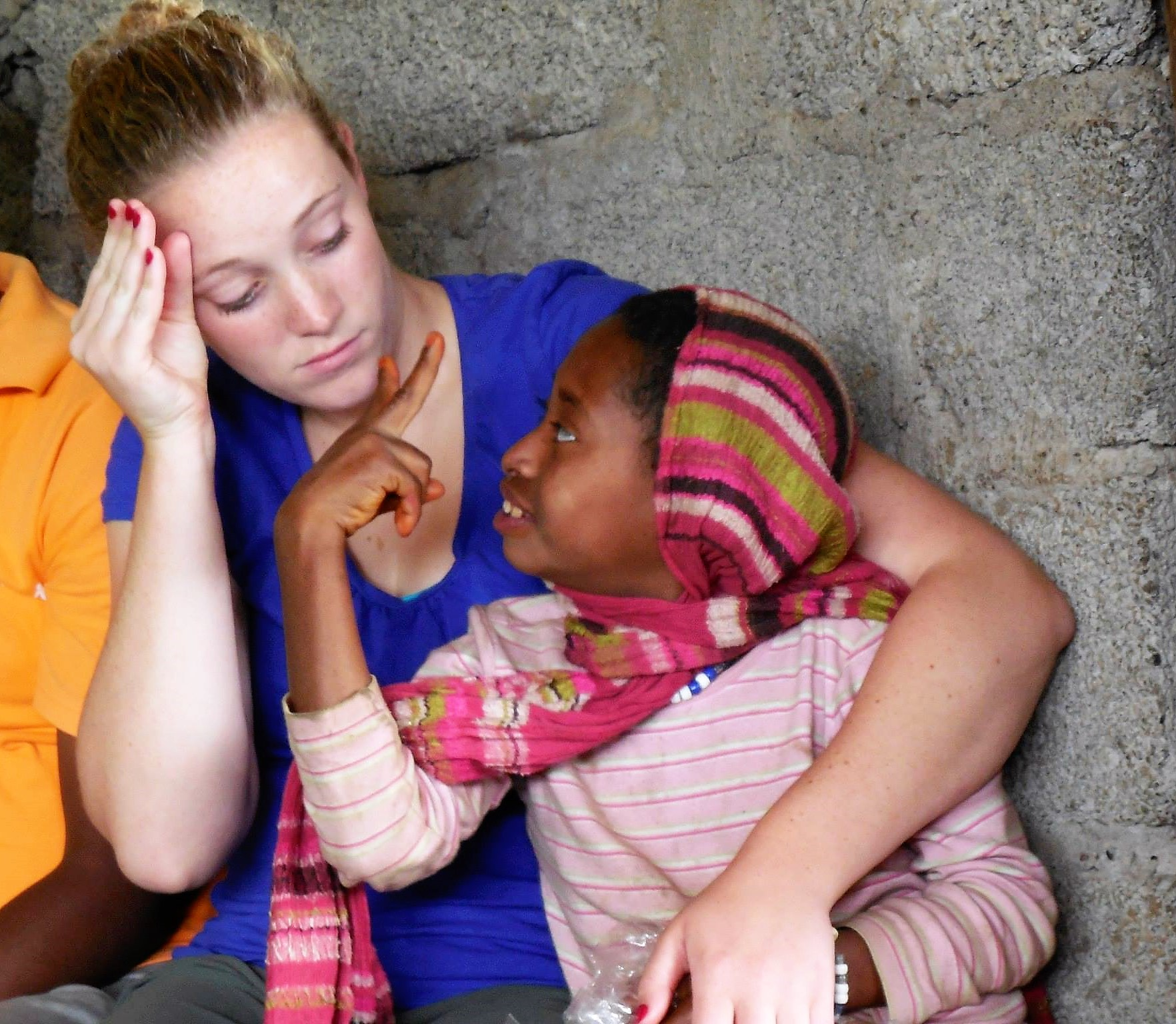
The emergence of Deaf Studies was facilitated by the revelation that signed languages are bona fide languages.

Deaf studies are academic disciplines concerned with the study of the deaf social life of human groups and individuals. These constitute an interdisciplinary field that integrates contents, critiques, and methodologies from anthropology, cultural studies, economics, geography, history, political science, psychology, social studies, and sociology, among others. The field focuses on the language, culture, and lives of the deaf from the social instead of the medical perspective.

Deaf studies are also described as those comprising the scientific study of the deaf-related aspects of the world.

== Background ==
Deaf studies emerged with the recognition that deaf people have a culture and that such culture is unique, requiring alternative ways of understanding this segment of the population outside of pathological frameworks. The University of Bristol began using the term "deaf studies" in 1984 after the founding of the Centre for Deaf Studies in 1968. Scholars began identifying themselves with the field, particularly after degree-granting programs in Deaf Studies began to emerge in the United Kingdom and the United States from the late 1970s to the 1980s. The first master's degree on Deaf Studies was introduced at the University of Bristol in 1992.

== Areas ==
Studying the lives of those who are deaf include learning about their culture, sign language, history and their human rights. Being involved in "Deaf Studies" means focusing on the sociological, historical and linguistic aspects of the deaf and hearing impaired. Within this, it prepares individuals to work with the deaf and hearing impaired. Those who participate and join this field of study are involved with promoting the change of views and perspectives of the larger society regarding Deaf people. Some perspectives of larger society, such as the belief that deafness is a disability, can result in deaf studies being related to the field of disability studies, although not all deaf people agree that deafness should be connected to disabilities. There is also an intersection of these fields in the study of those who are deaf plus, meaning both Deaf and disabled.

Deaf studies includes the study of:

- Deaf culture
- Deaf people
- Sign language
- Body language
- Social skills
- Personal skills

The field of Deaf studies has intersected with other academic fields of study. Examples of such fields are:

- Deaf theology
- Deaf philosophy
- Deaf history

== University-based deaf studies centers ==
- United States
  - Masters offered
    - Washington University in St. Louis, St. Louis, MO
    - Gallaudet University, Washington, D.C.
    - Lamar University, Beaumont, Texas
    - California State University, Northridge, Northridge, California
    - McDaniel College, Westminster, Maryland
  - Bachelors offered
    - Boston University, Boston, MA
    - Carolina University, Winston-Salem, NC
    - California State University, Northridge, Northridge, California
    - California State University, Sacramento, Sacramento, California
    - Columbia College Chicago, Chicago, Illinois
    - Gallaudet University, Washington, D.C.
    - Lamar University, Beaumont, Texas
    - Towson University, Towson, Maryland
    - Utah Valley University, Orem, Utah
    - Keuka College Keuka Park, New York
  - State Certifications
    - Texas Woman's University, Denton, Texas (offers Masters in Deaf Education)
    - Cincinnati State, Community College in Cincinnati Ohio (Offers masters, Interpreter Training Program ITP)
  - Associate in Arts offered
    - Bristol Community College, Fall River, MA
    - College of the Holy Cross, Worcester, MA
    - Ohlone College, Fremont, CA
    - Utah Valley University, Orem, Utah
- United Kingdom
  - University of Central Lancashire, Lancashire, England
  - Centre for Deaf Studies, Bristol, University of Bristol, Bristol
  - University of Wolverhampton, Wolverhampton, England
  - York Saint John University, York, England
- New Zealand
  - Victoria University of Wellington
- Germany
  - Humboldt University, Berlin
- Hong Kong
  - Centre for Sign Linguistics and Deaf Studies, The Chinese University of Hong Kong, Hong Kong
- India
  - National Institute of Speech and Hearing, Kerala, India (offers Degree in Deaf Education)
- The Netherlands
  - Visual Language, Signs and Gestures, Max Planck Institute for Psycholinguistics, Nijmegen
- Czech republic
  - Ustav jazyku a komunikace neslysicich (Institute of Deaf Studies), Faculty of Arts, Charles University, Prague
- Poland
  - Polish Sign Language Philology at the University of Warsaw, master's degree (second cycle studies)

== National and transnational Deaf studies centers ==
- New Zealand
  - Kelston Deaf Education Centre
- Philippines
  - School of Deaf Education and Applied Studies, De La Salle–College of Saint Benilde

== Deaf studies associations ==
- United States
  - CSUN Deaf Studies Association, Northridge, California
- United Kingdom
  - The British Association of Teachers of the Deaf

== Deaf-related major projects ==
- India
  - Deafchild India

== See also ==
- American Annals of the Deaf
- Journal of Deaf Studies and Deaf Education
- Deaf Bibliography for a categorised list of publications in the field since 1984
- Deaf history
- Deafhood
- Sign Language Studies

== External sources ==
- Ustav jazyku a komunikace neslysicich (Institute of Deaf Studies)
