= National Institute of Speech and Hearing =

Rehabilitation institute in India

- നാഷണൽ ഇൻസ്റ്റിറ്റ്യൂട്ട് ഓഫ് സ്പീച്ച് ആൻഡ് ഹിയറിങ്
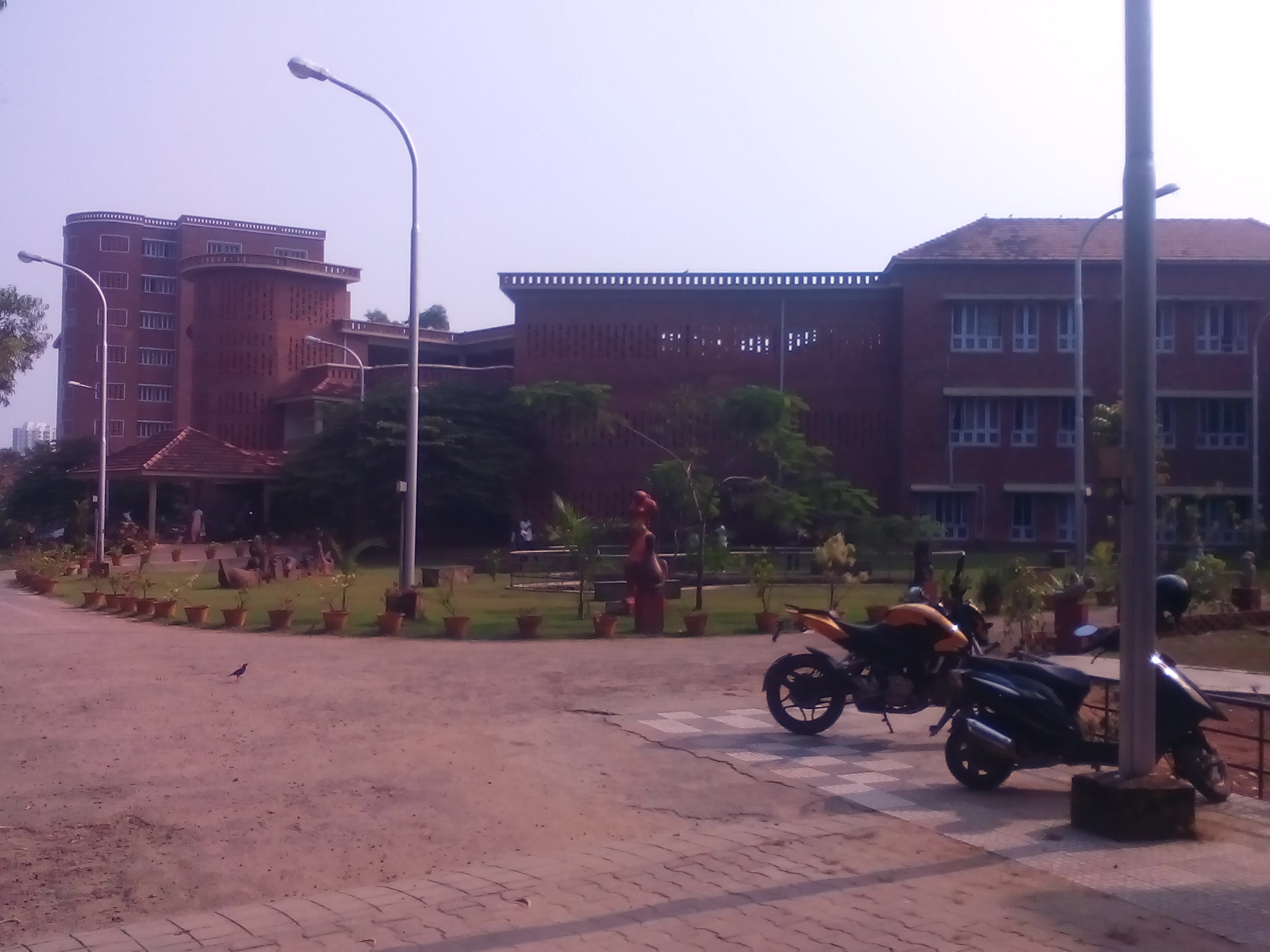
- NISH (National Institute of Speech and Hearing)
- NISH Rd, Aakkulam, Thiruvananthapuram, Kerala 695017, India; South Asia

Information
- Other name: NISH
- Established: 1997

The National Institute of Speech and Hearing (NISH) is an institute devoted to the education and rehabilitation of individuals with speech-language and hearing impairments located in Thiruvananthapuram, the capital city in the Indian state of Kerala. It was established in 1997 on the initiative of the state of Kerala and is a self-financing affiliate college of the University of Kerala. Academics at NISH is unique in the sense that NISH has an integrated campus where students with hearing impairment and students with normal hearing share the same campus. Bachelor's level courses exclusively for students with hearing impairment include Degree courses in Fine Arts, Computer Science and Commerce affiliated to University of Kerala. On the other hand, NISH also provides RCI approved professional courses at undergraduate level and graduate level in Audiology and Speech Language Pathology as well as diploma courses affiliated to Kerala Health University (KUHS)

Its academic courses include Bachelor in Audiology & Speech and Language Pathology, Master in Audiology & Speech and Language Pathology, Bachelor of Occupational Therapy (BOT),Bachelor of Science in Computer Science (for the hearing impaired), and Bachelor of Fine Arts (for the hearing impaired).

== Internal mentoring ==
The NISH launched a mentoring programme for first year students. Each teacher is given three or four students to mentor.

== Experiential learning ==
A program of experiential learning was started at the NISH in December 2012 with 17 students participating in an activity-based learning method where the students become performers and the teachers, facilitators.

== Activities of NISH ==
- Implementation of various disability-related projects of Govt. of India and Govt. of Kerala.
- Consultative work on policy formulation and implementation on disability as assigned by Government
- Trans-disciplinary assessment and intervention for various disabilities (Communication Disorders, Autism Spectrum Disorders, Other Developmental Disabilities) by audiologists, speech-language pathologists, physiotherapists, occupational therapists, special educators, psychologists, ENT doctors, and Neurologists.
- Early intervention programs for young hearing-impaired children before school age
- Early intervention programs for young children in the Autism Spectrum
- Academic programs including degree courses for Hearing Impaired students,
- Professional rehabilitation courses like BASLP, MASLP, DECSE, and DISLI.
- Assistive Technology (AT) assessment, implementation, and follow-up.
- Counseling and parent guidance.
- Camps and outreach programs such as Public Seminars, Hands-on workshops, CRE programs
- Social relevant research in the field of disability & rehabilitation
- Collaborative projects with institutions in India as well as international
- Faculty exchange programs with institutions working in similar areas both domestic and international
- Internship and employment support for students with industrial organizations
