= Journal of Deaf Studies and Deaf Education =

- Discipline: Deaf studies, deaf education
- Language: English
- Edited by: Hannah Dostal

Publication details
- History: 1996–present
- Publisher: Oxford University Press
- Frequency: Quarterly
- Impact factor: 2.0, 5 Year Impact Factor 1.938, 2021 Impact Factor; 2024 Cite Score (Scopus) = 3.1

Standard abbreviations
- ISO 4: J. Deaf Stud. Deaf Educ.

Indexing
- ISSN: 1081-4159 (print); 1465-7325 (web)
- LCCN: 96660060
- OCLC no.: 32075519

Links
- Journal homepage; Online access; Online archive

The Journal of Deaf Studies and Deaf Education is a peer-reviewed academic journal covering basic and applied research relating to individuals who are deaf, including developmental, cultural, educational, and linguistic topics. It is published by Oxford University Press four times per year since the first volume and issue, which was published in 1996. The journal publishes original academic research, scoping and literature reviews, meta-analyses, family and practitioner briefs, book reviews, and signed media.

The journal is committed to increasing diversity in all areas of the publication process by creating processes that value and center historically marginalized perspectives.

== Editors ==
Editor	Years active
Hannah Dostal	2022–present
Editor	Years active
Susan Easterbrooks	2016–2024
Editor	Years active
Marc Marschark	1996–2016

== Abstracting and indexing ==
The journal is indexed and abstracted in: CINAHL, Current Contents® /Social and Behavioral Sciences, Education Research Abstracts, E-psyche, Journal Citation Reports /Social Sciences Edition, Linguistics & Language Behavior Abstracts, MEDLINE with Full Text, ProQuest 5000 International, ProQuest Central, ProQuest Health & Medical Complete, ProQuest Medical Library, ProQuest Nursing & Allied Health Source, ProQuest Pharma Collection, ProQuest Psychology Journals, ProQuest Wilson Databases, PsycINFO Database with Full Text, Psychlit, Social Sciences Citation Index®, Social Scisearch®, Studies on Women and Gender Abstracts, The Standard Periodical Directory, and Wilson OmniFile Full Text Mega Edition.
