= Hermann Alker =

German architect

- Born: 13 March 1885; Lambrecht, Germany
- Died: 26 May 1967 (aged 82); Karlsruhe, Germany
- Occupation: Architect

Hermann Alker (13 March 1885 – 26 May 1967) was a German architect. His work was part of the art competitions at the 1928 Summer Olympics, the 1932 Summer Olympics, and the 1936 Summer Olympics.
