= British Deaf Association =

UK charitable organization

The British Deaf Association (BDA) is a deaf-led British charity that campaigns and advocates for deaf people who use British Sign Language.

== History ==
It was preceded by the National Association for the Deaf and Dumb (NADD), which had been founded by deaf people in 1886. The creation of the NADD had been in response to the perceived threats to the language and education rights of deaf people which had arisen after the Milan Conference of 1880. This international congress, where the majority of those attending were people who taught hearing to deaf children, had passed a resolution banning the use of sign languages throughout the world. The participants of the conference had then returned to their home countries, determined to eradicate both the employment of deaf teachers and the use of sign language in schools. They also sought to reduce class sizes to those that were manageable by hearing teachers.

A Royal Commission on the education of deaf children was launched in 1889 but it failed to consult deaf people and supported the establishment of the Pure Oral System and so the banning of sign language; in response the magazine Deaf Mute encouraged deaf people to unite in defence of their own interests.

In 1889, the NADD ceased to exist and so four deaf men, including Francis Maginn and George Healey, arranged a meeting in January 1890 at St. Saviour's Church for the Deaf, Oxford Street, London, that they called the "National Conference of Adult Deaf and Dumb Missions and Associations". The conference considered the forming of a national society to "elevate the education and social status of the Deaf and Dumb in the United Kingdom" and resulted in the formation of the British Deaf and Dumb Association (BDDA) in Leeds on 24 July 1890. The BDDA deleted the world "Dumb" from its title in 1971. It wasn't until the 1970s that schools began to look again at accepting sign language.

The advent of sign language and its acceptance by the general public resulted in deaf leaders slowly coming back to the forefront starting with Jock Young as the first deaf chair in 1983 and, in the mid-1990s, its first deaf chief executive, Jeff McWhinney.

In the 1990s the BDA became a deaf-led organisation and the campaigning for the recognition of sign language is to date the main focus of their work. The current Chair is Dr. Robert Adam. Previous Chairs include the late Terry Riley, editor of the BBC's See Hear programme.

== Chairs ==
Jock Young (1983-)

Murray Holmes

== Charter ==
In 2003, the BDA released a document describing various steps for public services to improve accessibility for Deaf people and BSL users, called the 'BSL Charter'.

In 2017, the BDA released an updated version of the charter called the Charter for British Sign Language.

=== Signatures ===
The Mayor of London, Sadiq Khan, signed the charter in November 2023.

== See also ==
- Doug Alker
- Terry Riley
- Arthur Verney
- Jock Young
