= Sign Language Studies =

- Discipline: Deaf studies, deaf education, sign languages
- Language: English
- Edited by: Ceil Lucas

Publication details
- History: 1972–present
- Publisher: Gallaudet University Press (United States)
- Frequency: Quarterly

Standard abbreviations
- ISO 4: Sign Lang. Stud.

Indexing
- ISSN: 0302-1475 (print); 1533-6263 (web)
- LCCN: 74641714
- JSTOR: 03021475
- OCLC no.: 7831830517

Links
- Journal homepage; Online archives (2000-present); Journal page at Project MUSE

Sign Language Studies is a quarterly peer-reviewed academic journal covering basic and applied research relating to sign languages used throughout the world. It was established in 1972 with William Stokoe of Gallaudet University as founding editor-in-chief. It covers linguistic, cultural, and educational topics.

== History ==
The journal was established by William Stokoe, with the first issue printed in 1972. From 1973 to 1975, the journal was published with the support of Thomas Sebeok through Mouton and Company and Indiana University. Subsequently, the journal was published by Stokoe's publishing company, Linstok Press in Silver Spring, Maryland. Stokoe chose to number issues consecutively since the journal's inception. Linstok Press continued as the journal's publisher until the winter of 1996, and the last issue printed by Linstok was number 93.

Following Stokoe's death, Gallaudet University Press took over publication in 2000 after a 3-year hiatus. The journal's numbering was restarted with "Volume 1, Issue 1". David F. Armstrong, who had served on the editorial board since 1986, became the new editor of the journal. Armstrong served as editor from 2000 to 2009. Ceil Lucas served as editor from 2009 to 2021. The current editors are Erin Wilkinson and Pilar Pinar.

=== Editors ===
The following persons are or have been editor-in-chief:

- William C. Stokoe (1972-1996)
- David F. Armstrong (2000-2009)
- Ceil Lucas (2009–2021)
- Erin Wilkinson and Pilar Pinar (2021-present)

== Abstracting and indexing ==
- EBSCO databases
- Emerging Sources Citation Index
- ERIC
- International Bibliography of the Social Sciences
- Modern Language Association Database
- ProQuest databases
- PsycINFO
- Scopus
