= Paddy Ladd =

English deaf scholar, author, activist, researcher (born 1952)

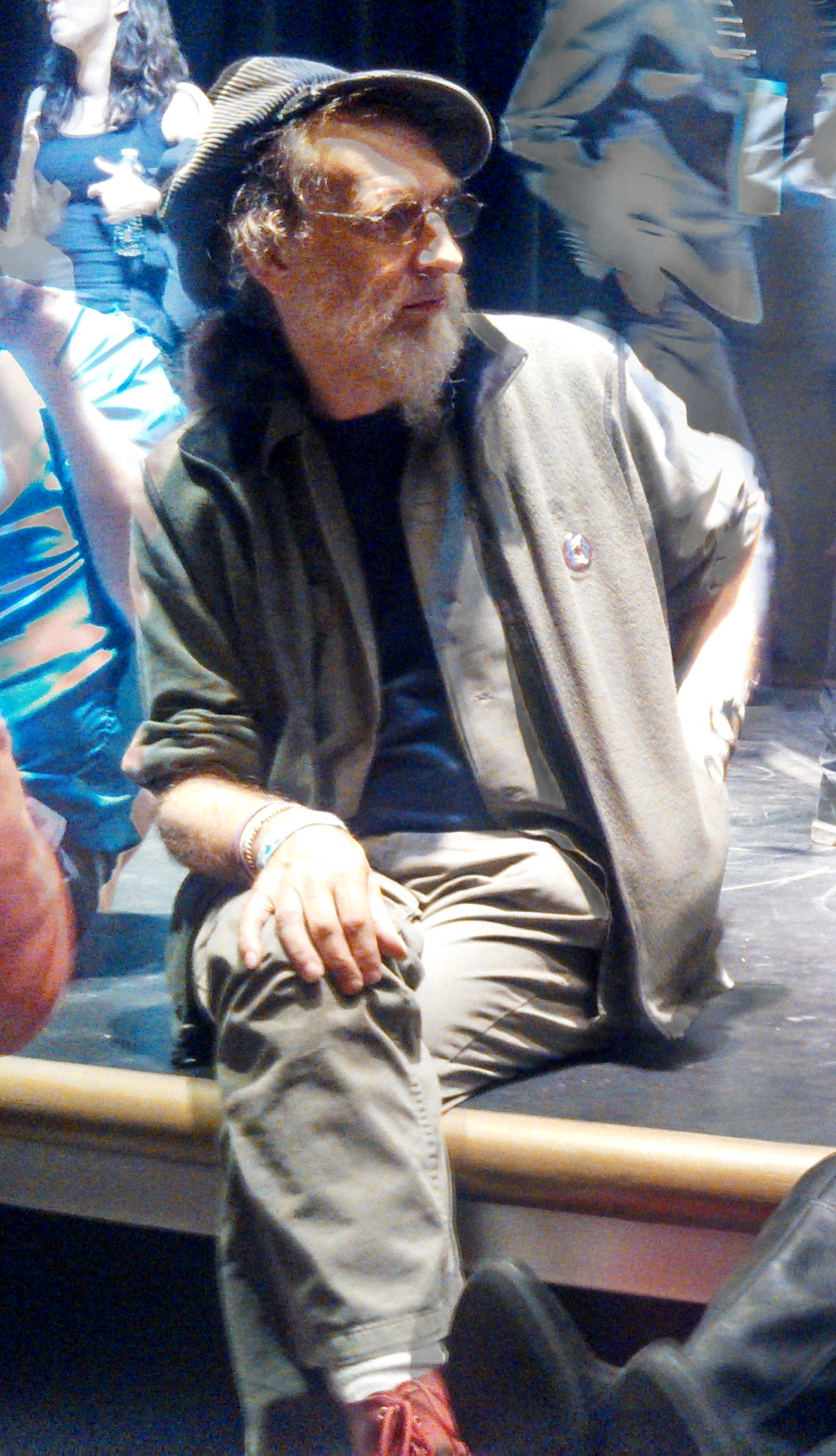
- Ladd attending a performance of Deafhood Monologues at the Tower Theatre in September 2013
- Born: 11 February 1952 (age 74)
- Occupations: Deaf scholar; author; activist; researcher

Paddy Ladd (born 11 February 1952) is an English deaf scholar, author, activist and researcher of deaf culture. He has been a core campaigner for Deaf rights since the 80s, and was involved in the National Union of the Deaf, one of the earliest British Deaf activist organisations. Ladd worked at the Centre for Deaf Studies at the University of Bristol where he had previously studied. He has written, edited and contributed to numerous publications in the field, including coining the term 'Deafhood'. His works have received international recognition.

== Early life ==
Ladd was born in 1952 in Windsor, Berkshire to working class parents who had struggled for a long time to have children. He has a younger brother. Ladd was taught to read and write by his mother before he started school. She enrolled Ladd at a local hearing school, defying a doctor who had told her to send him to a residential school in Manchester. Ladd's mother died from cancer when he was 8, having been ill for 6 years, and his father raised the two children on his own, working seven days a week to support them. Ladd remembers his father being scolding and emotionally distant.

Following the death of his mother, Ladd's father moved the family from Windsor to a small village near Swindon, Wiltshire where he attended another mainstream primary school. His experience there was not enjoyable and negatively affected his self-esteem. At age 18, Ladd went to Reading University to study English literature. Having to rely on lip-reading, he had trouble following the lectures.

== Career ==
=== Social work ===
After graduating, he applied for many jobs, including a teacher of deaf children, but was rejected because he was deaf. Ladd decided on becoming a social worker for deaf people and tried to enrol at North London Polytechnic under Arthur Verney. However, he was told he needed more experience before he would be accepted. Ladd found work in Hillingdon in London as a social worker for deaf children. Having not been taught to sign up until this point, at the age of 22 Ladd enrolled on a course run by hearing people.

=== National Union of the Deaf ===
In 1976, Ladd was one of the co-founders of the National Union of the Deaf (NUD). There he met elder deaf people such as Arthur Dimmock and Stan Woodhouse. Part of the reason for its establishment was the perceived disconnect between the aims of deaf people, and organisations for deaf people (run by hearing people) such as the National Deaf Association (NDA) and the National Deaf Children's Society. The NUD advocated for education for deaf children through direct action as well as Deaf representation on British television. In 1981, Ladd was asked to be one of two Deaf senior administrators within the NDA, the other being with Lilian Lawson. There, he finally felt at home within the Deaf community, and it was here that he met figures such as Dorothy Miles.

=== Deaf television ===
Through the BBC community television programme Open Door (1973-1983), the NUD developed and submitted Signs of Life, a programme showcasing the Deaf community and its aspirations for representation on television, with Ladd as the presenter. It was broadcast in 1979, after a 2 year wait. Bill Cotton, director of the BBC had seen the programme and organised for it to be archived owing to its cultural and historical significance.

The NUD and BDA came together to set up the Deaf Broadcasting Campaign (DBC) which demanded a weekly Deaf programme.

==== See Hear ====
Emerging out of the previous conversations with Bill Cotton, in 1981, See Hear began its weekly broadcast on the BBC. Ladd was approached by Arthur Verney while still working at the BDA and was asked to be a presenter for the programme. Ladd was reluctant at first because he had strongly disliked the early series, as the presenters were told to speak and were permitted to use only minimal signing. Verney managed to convince Ladd and he became part of the programme, hoping to change it from the inside. Ladd was the first deaf presenter, and presented the earliest programmes from 1984 in both sign and speech.

=== Return to academia ===
In 1992, Ladd returned to academia and became the first non-US citizen to hold the Powrie V. Doctor Chair in Deaf Studies at Gallaudet University, Washington DC. He left the university in 1993.

Ladd completed his Ph.D. in Deaf Culture at the University of Bristol in 1998. There, by 2003 he became director of graduate studies at the Centre for Deaf Studies. He was also a lecturer and MSc Coordinator for Deaf Studies at the University of Bristol to approx 2007, then after a brief pause, MSc in Deafhood Studies 2009. Despite considerable international pressure, the centre was wound down as the MSc was closed in 2009, the undergrad programme taught out from 2010 to 2013, and the centre finally closed in the July of that year.

Ladd's contribution to the Deaf world has not only been academic. For a period, he toured with the Grateful Dead as their on stage interpreter. He was also founder of the Glastonbury Festival's Sign Zone, which provided translators to sign from designated locations at the Glastonbury site.

In 2003, Ladd authored the book, Understanding Deaf Culture: In Search of Deafhood, the first book on Deaf culture to be written outside the US.

== Select publications ==
- — (2002). Understanding Deaf Culture: In Search of Deafhood. Clevedon, UK: Multilingual Matters. ISBN 9781853595462. OCLC 729954482.
- — (2022). Seeing Through New Eyes, Deaf Cultures and Deaf Pedagogies: The Unrecognized Curriculum. San Diego, CA: Dawnsign Press. ISBN 9781581211399. OCLC 1284919922.

== See also ==
- British Sign Language
