= Audism =

Form of discrimination against deaf people

Audism as described by deaf activists is a form of discrimination directed against deaf people, which may include those diagnosed as deaf from birth, or otherwise. Tom L. Humphries coined the term in an unpublished manuscript in 1975, which he later reiterated in his doctoral project in 1977, but it did not start to catch on until Harlan Lane used it in his writing. Humphries originally applied audism to individual attitudes and practices; whereas Lane broadened the term to include oppression of deaf people.

== Types of audism ==
Linguistic audism can occur by banning use of sign languages, such as the 1880 Milan conference when signed language was banned in schools. Many schools throughout the world engaged in such prohibition and some continue to do so. Audism may also be found in deaf education and in other corporate institutions and groups that deal with deafness. In these cases the educators, administrators, and professionals within these organizations behave in a way that is meant to dominate or marginalize the deaf community.

Dysconscious audism favors what is normal for hearing people. This limits deaf culture and pride, by creating an environment in which deaf people must conform to the ways of hearing people. It greatly impacts deaf education in terms of shunning sign languages (manualism) in favor of communication that is based on spoken languages (oralism), and more acceptable to hearing people.

Ben Bahan describes audism in two forms: overt and covert audism. Overt audism is a term used to define deaf people and their culture as inferior to hearing culture. In the medical field, this idea can manifest by looking at deafness as something to be fixed, but can also be applied to practices such as audiology, speech therapy, medicine psychology, social work and other fields. This does not mean that all institutions inherently practice audism but that they are revert to audiological tendencies. These two forms illustrate the exclusion of deaf people from specific institutions or practices. Bahan notes inventions such as telephones, radios, or a lunch bell can be considered audist because they are sound-based technologies.

Additionally, deaf people can practice forms of discrimination against members of their own community, based on what they believe is acceptable behavior, use of language, or social association. Dr. Genie Gertz explored examples of such audism in American society in her published dissertation. Audism can also occur between groups of deaf people, with some who choose not to use a sign language and not to identify with deaf culture considering themselves to be superior to those who do, or members of the deaf community asserting superiority over deaf people who use listening and spoken language to communicate. Dr. Frank P. Adams investigated manifestation of dysconscious Audism as Crab Mentality and implicit discriminatory attitudes in his published dissertation This also applies to members of the deaf community who obtain cochlear implants. For several decades, cochlear implants have caused disputes within the deaf community regarding the concept of the deaf identity. In a show of audism from both sides, deaf individuals may shun those with cochlear implants for not being "deaf enough", while those with the implants may look down on those who choose not to get them.

Active audism is when a person knowingly engages in audist behavior. The person knows the effects of audism, yet still engages in this behavior and has an audist attitude. Passive audism is when a person is engaging in audist behavior, yet does not have knowledge about the deaf community's values. Passive audists do not think about how their actions or words concern deaf individuals, hearing individuals, or sign language.

== History ==
The principles and ideas behind audism have been experienced by the deaf community for many centuries, but the term "audism" was first coined in 1975 by deaf scholar Tom Humphries in his unpublished essay. Humphries originally defined audism as, "the notion that one is superior based on one's ability to hear or behave in the manner of one who hears". Since then, other scholars, such as Harlan Lane in his book, Mask of Benevolence, have attempted to further expand on Humphries' definition to include different levels of audism: individual, institutional, metaphysical, and laissez-faire. As Humphries' definition stands, it only incorporates individual audism, which includes deaf jokes, hate crimes, and low classroom expectations of deaf people.

The idea that there is systemic, or institutional, audism within society was originally proposed in Harlan Lane's Mask of Benevolence, as an extension of David T. Wellman's concept of institutional racism. It was further expanded by H-Dirksen Bauman, in Audism: Exploring the Metaphysics of Oppression, and again, by Richard Eckert and Amy Rowley, in Audism: A Theory and Practice of Audiocentric Privilege, and institutional audism is now described as, "a structural system of exploitative advantage that focuses on and perpetuates the subordination of deaf Communities of origin, language, and culture".

Despite scholars' best efforts to incorporate all aspects of audism, still, there is another important facet of audism. Scholars have noted that deaf people who used their voice had more societal rights than those deaf people who did not have the ability to speak. In attempt to quantify this relationship, Bauman extended the concept of phonocentrism proposed by Jacques Derrida, "the supremacy of speech and repression of nonphonetic forms of communication", and developed the term, metaphysical audism. Metaphysical audism refers to the idea of language being a distinguishing factor in what makes us human; however, with metaphysical audism, language becomes confused with speech, and in turn, speech becomes linked to being human.

== Origins of audism ==
The seeds of audism were reflected in the lack of early documentation and a misunderstanding of deaf people and their language. Limited evidence can be provided about the treatment of deaf individuals by ancient civilizations. However, the documentation that is provided shows a resistance towards deaf people as a functioning part of society. Aristotle's Poetics alluded that those labeled as "disabled" would be put to death for the benefit of the rest of society. During the time of the Renaissance, efforts to educate deaf individuals posed complications due to the lack of literacy from the vast majority of society, deaf and hearing alike. In New England during the pilgrimage to America, any variant from the category of the norm was grounds for witchcraft or sorcery.

Richard Eckert coined the term laissez-faire audism to indicate the modern state of acknowledging members the deaf community's humanity, but denying their independence, for example through pediatric cochlear implantation.

== Audism in the educational system ==
Audiological ideologies have shaped curriculum within deaf Education. Because deaf people make up 1% of the American population, teachers are less equipped to work with the needs of deaf or hard of hearing students. In the US, the Individuals with Disabilities Education Act (IDEA) and the Education for all Handicapped Children Act (EAHCA) allow deaf children to more easily participate in mainstream public education if their families so choose. These acts provide education policies that reinforced integration of deaf individuals into hearing society. Signed languages were generally replaced with Manually Coded English as a method of communication, and deaf and hard of hearing students were placed with hearing students in hopes that this would further speech development. Within these mainstream public schools deaf students face challenges such as needing to focus on a computer or a board while keeping up with the class conversation. Additionally, due to the design of some of these schools curriculums, deaf students are more likely to fall behind in reading levels compared to their hearing classmates. This gap in reading level between deaf students and their hearing peers is also likely to grow as they progress through school.

Institutions such as the National Association of the Deaf (NAD) continue to work with U.S. Officials to improve these policies, claiming these educational practices were audist and create precedence of one language over another by implementing English as the primary language for instruction.

== Audism in the legal system ==
Lack of access to communication in trials of deaf individuals has resulted in mistrials attributed to factors including interpreter and CART provider error and unqualified interpretation, all contributing to an overall lack of understanding or misunderstanding by the judge and members of the jury. These factors have also led to unlawful sentences in some criminal cases. The Americans with Disabilities Act (ADA) requires deaf individuals be given equal access in the courtroom through a qualified interpreter. The law establishes stricter guidelines for interpreting licensure, aiming to reduce the number of errors in the courtroom.

Conversely, a deaf man convicted of rape in Norway successfully appealed for a shorter sentence by arguing his deafness constituted a mitigating circumstance, reducing his degree of culpability for the crime. The court's decision angered the Norwegian deaf community, which perceived the rationale behind the reduced sentence as patronizing, ignoring the capacity of deaf individuals to reason and thus to be held fully accountable and to receive the same sentences as other, hearing, Norwegian citizens.

Another example of audism in the legal system was what happened to a man by the name of Magdiel Sanchez. This man was shot and killed in front of his house by a police officer for approaching them with a metal pipe, which according to his neighbors he used to communicate and ward off stray dogs.

According to a news article from CNN there was a hit and run committed by Magdiel Sanchez's father (he did not hit a person) and when the police arrived at the scene, Magdiel was on his porch and began to walk towards the officers with a metal pipe. The officers Sgt Christopher Barnes and, Lt Matthew Lindsey, yelled for Sanchez to drop his pipe; but being deaf he could not hear them. Sanchez's neighbors who were on the scene, tried to tell the officers that Magdiel could not hear them because he was deaf.

While this may not be exactly audism, it does show that the legal system did not have any protocol for communicating with deaf people; nor did they have someway to identify, if a person is deaf or hard of hearing, such as signing "are you deaf?" to a person who does not respond to verbal demands.

Domestic crimes committed among and against deaf individuals tend to have a lower investigation rate than domestic crime between hearing individuals. A study shows that deaf women have a higher rate of abuse than hearing women, although the disparity has attracted little attention for further research.

Among deaf individuals incarcerated in Texas in 2004, 20% were judged "linguistically incompetent", unable to either understand the charges they faced or to meaningfully participate in the creation of their defense, while another 30% were "adjudicatively incompetent, unable to understand the legal proceedings without targeted instructional intervention. These statuses were the results of either lack of fluency in any language or functional illiteracy, respectively. As a result, it is unlikely that these deaf inmates had received their constitutional right to due process of law. However, all deaf inmates studied had nevertheless been convicted and incarcerated, possible violations of their constitutional rights. Notably, deaf individuals who were either ASL-dominant bilinguals equally comfortable in both American Sign Language (ASL) and English were the least likely to fall into either category and therefore the most likely to have received due process.

== Audism in linguistics ==
Audism can be closely linked to the term linguicism, or ideologies that pertain to the way in which an institution is facilitated and regulated in favor of a dominant culture through the basis of language. Linguicism highlights spoken language to be a part of the dominant culture and signed languages to be of the minority culture, expanding that those who use spoken language are provided with more accessible economic, social and political resources which give them an advantage over those who use signed languages.

Audism is linked to phonocentric values in defining linguistics. Linguistic terminology has been determined by sound based methodologies, for instance the concept of linearity in spoken languages fails to recognize the grammatical structures of visual-manual-kinesthetic based languages. Additionally, early twentieth century linguists determined those without sound-based languages did not possess any capacity for language while others romanticized sign languages or believed them to be primitive. However, additional linguists argue this claim minimizes the advances in deaf studies and the recognition of signed languages as a part of the linguistic lexicon.

For centuries, there has been controversy over whether linguistic theory pertains to signed languages. It was not until William Stokoe contested this argument and found structural evidence that linked ASL to linguistic rules that ASL was finally recognized as a language. These claims, however, are still contested by some lawmakers and educators due to the inability to recognize the rules of visual-modal languages and misconceptions of their origins outside of sound-based languages.

== Additional resources pertaining to audism ==
Personal accounts of audism have been documented from documentaries such as Audism Unveiled, a movie that discusses the oppression of deaf people and their personal struggles with audism. Other accounts can be seen through the research of academics such as Peter Hauser whose TedTalk illustrated the detriments audism has on the identity. His studied illustrated a connection between the lack of exposure to deaf culture and a deaf person's self esteem.

== Controversy ==
Activists in the deaf community claim that audists harm deaf culture by considering deafness a disability, rather than as a cultural difference. Some deaf activists assert that cochlear implants are a tool of cultural genocide.

As many as 95% of deaf children in the US are born to hearing parents.

== Advocates for audist ideology ==
Alexander Graham Bell – inventor of the telephone. An avid supporter of eugenics, he published the essay Memoir Upon the Formation of a Deaf Variety of the Human Race which condemned intermarriage between deaf individuals. He championed the oralist movement, his associated endeavors including pushing for the removal of sign language from deaf schools to be replaced with his own alphabet called "Visible Speech", and striving to cure deafness.

Horace Mann founded the first school for the deaf in Connecticut but whose policies educational reform that pushed the oralist methods, such as a focus on lipreading and articulation in the education of deaf children.

Garrick Mallery studied Indian culture and sign language for the Bureau of Ethnology in the Smithsonian Institution. Although he recognized the validity of modal languages, he argued that signed languages were inferior to oral languages on the basis that they could not be written down.

== Activists against audism ==
Rikki Poynter (born 1991) is a deaf YouTuber and activist. She began as a beauty vlogger and is now a lifestyle vlogger with a focus on deaf awareness, accessibility, and the importance of closed captioning.

== See also ==
- Oralism
- Deaf Education
- Deafhood
- Deaf culture
- Deaf Gain
- Models of deafness
- Language Acquisition
