= Karen Nakamura =

- Born: October 23, 1970 (age 55)
- Education: Cornell University (B.A.), Yale University (M.Phil., Ph.D.)
- Occupations: Academic, author, filmmaker, photographer
- Known for: Robert and Colleen Haas Distinguished Chair of Disability Studies, Professor of Anthropology at University of California, Berkeley
- Awards: John Whitney Hall Book Prize (2008), Abe Fellowship (2003), Carnegie Corporation Great Immigrants Award (2022)

Karen Nakamura (born October 23, 1970) is an American academic, author, filmmaker, photographer and the Robert and Colleen Haas Distinguished Chair of Disability Studies and Professor of Anthropology at University of California, Berkeley. Previously she was associate professor of Anthropology and East Asian Studies and Chair of LGBT Studies at Yale University.

== Work ==
Nakamura was awarded a B.A. in psychology from Cornell University in 1993. She continued her studies at Yale University, earning an M.Phil. in Socio-Cultural Anthropology in 1998. She was awarded her Ph.D. at Yale in 2001.

Nakamura is currently the Robert and Colleen Haas Distinguished Chair of Disability Studies and Professor of Anthropology at University of California, Berkeley. She has previously worked at Yale University, Macalester College, and Bowdoin College as well as a brief stint working for Canon/NeXT and heading her own company, Global Mapping Systems.

== Selected works ==
In a statistical overview derived from writings by and about Karen Nakamura, OCLC/WorldCat encompasses roughly 9 works in 10+ publications in 1 language and 400+ library holdings.

- "A Disability of the Soul : an Ethnography of Schizophrenia and Mental Illness in Contemporary Japan" (2013)
- Deaf in Japan: Signing and the Politics of Identity (2006)
- Deaf Identities, Sign Languages, and Minority Social Movement Politics in Modern Japan (1868-2000) (2001)
- About American Sign Language (2006)
- Deaf Resource Library (2009)

== Honors ==
- Association for Asian Studies, John Whitney Hall Book Prize, 2008
- Abe Fellowship, Social Science Research Council and Japan Foundation Center for Global Partnership, 2003
- In 2022, Nakamura was named by Carnegie Corporation of New York as an honoree of the Great Immigrants Awards.
