= Islay (novel) =

1986 novel by Douglas Bullard

- Author: Douglas Bullard
- Cover artist: Eugene Orr
- Language: English
- Genre: Novel
- Publisher: T.J. PUBLISHERS INC.
- Publication date: 1986
- Publication place: United States
- Media type: Print
- Pages: 337 pp

Islay is a novel by author Douglas Bullard. It is "the first and possibly the only novel by a Deaf American to focus on Deaf culture" (Peters 122). Islay was published in 1986 by T.J. PUBLISHERS, INC. located in Silver Spring, Maryland. The novel tells the story of the protagonist Lyson Sulla, who has a goal of becoming Governor of the State of Islay and making it a state by and for Deaf people.

== About the author ==
Douglass Bullard (1937–2005), was a graduate of Gallaudet College. He grew up in the Deep South and traveled around the world as well as lived in many different places. He was an Alaskan geologist and is the author of several novels. Islay, however, is the only work of his that was published. He was the president of the Florida Association of the Deaf for some time.

== Writing style ==
The text of Islay is written in three different codes. The bulk of the text is written in English. Additionally, American Sign Language used in dialogue between characters is written in italicized ASL Gloss. Finally, dialogue across TTY machines in Islay is written in capital letters.

The italicized gloss form of ASL used in Islay is neither truly English nor truly ASL. An example of this gloss form, coming from Lyson about his desire for a homeland for the Deaf is as follows:

You know that Laurent Clerc had same dream. Himself greatest deaf in history, started Golden Age for deaf there France. Then brought sign here America; almost started new Golden Age for us deaf, but hearing oralism frustrated him, broke up deaf cooperation and almost destroyed Sign Language. That why Clerc liked idea for deaf gathering into one state where deaf itself normal! (6–7).

The ASL gloss used in Islay is a word for word translation of ASL, keeping word order but losing much of the grammar of the language. This method shows the differences between spoken English and sign language.

An example of the TTY writing form is as follows:

MARY HERE. WHERE HAVE YOU BEEN Q. I WAITED SINCE SIX. DISGUSTED GA. (67).

When using a TTY, the 'Q' after a sentence makes it a question. 'GA' means "go ahead", which informs the person on the other line that you are done talking and they can type their response.

Islay 's different coding styles are unique, but easily understood by those with a background in American Sign Language and TTYs.

== Meaning of title ==
When the book was first released, there was much talk about what the title meant. Some people speculated it was a mix of the finger spelled acronyms for "I Love You" (ILY) and American Sign Language (ASL) while others hypothesized it was derived from "island". "Bullard actually came across the word in the dictionary, liked how it sounded, and decided to use it – then later flew to the island Islay off the coast of Scotland only to discover that the real island closely resembled his fictional one" (Peters 124).

== Plot summary ==
The book has three sections, titled "Strings", "Drums", and "Cymbals". These three sections document Lyson's journey to make Islay a Deaf state. He comes across many problems along the way, and is ridiculed by some. Others accuse him of being a peddler and he is misunderstood by many. His wife, in the beginning of the novel is embarrassed by his dream and keeps Lyson behind lock and key when he is working on his project. She does not want her friends to know about what he is doing and does everything in her power to keep it a secret.

In the first section, "Strings", the book's protagonist Lyson Sulla is in the beginning stages of his plans for a state by and for Deaf people. He is learning about the state Islay, and how it could work for what he is envisioning. He receives financial support from his in-laws so that he can move to Islay. Once there, he spends a week's time looking over the state, seeing how it will work for him, and meeting with public officials. He is pleased with what he sees in Islay and believes that it will work for what he plans. He moves his wife, Mary out to Islay with him. Once they are moved into a large home, they throw a big party.

The second section, "Drums" documents Lyson's travels to recruit other Deaf people to move to Islay. He meets many Deaf people along the way and is able to convince many well-established Deaf people to move to Islay. He also has a few misunderstandings along the way when people misunderstand what his intentions and meanings are.

In the last section, "Cymbals", many Deaf people move their families to Islay and open businesses. Lyson still has troubles, as he is accused of real estate fraud. However, he gets out of this predicament. Those who moved to Islay register to vote, so as to help Lyson become governor. The election is a rough experience for Lyson, but in the end he wins, becoming Governor of Islay.

== See also ==
- List of historical separatist movements in North America – Former separatist movements
