= Doug Alker =

British writer

Doug Alker (1940 - 2025) was the former chair of the British Deaf Association and the Royal National Institute for the Deaf. His self-published 2000 book, Really Not Interested in the Deaf?, is a criticism of the Royal National Institute for the Deaf (RNID) and the story of his departure from the group.

After leaving RNID Alker set up the radical political pressure group Federation of Deaf People (FDP) in 1998. As the chair, he and the FDP are primarily responsible for pressuring the UK government into officially recognizing British Sign Language. The FDP organised a 4000-strong march to Trafalgar Square in 1999 demanding the recognition of BSL. The march also delivered a petition to 10 Downing Street with 30,000 signatures backing the cause. On 18 March 2003 the UK government formally recognized that BSL is a language in its own right.

He previously worked as a researcher for the BBC television programme See Hear.

== Publications ==
- Alker, Doug (1 July 2000). Really Not Interested in the Deaf?. Doug Alker. ISBN 978-0953903702.
