= Deafhood =

Term used in deaf culture

Deafhood is a term coined by Paddy Ladd in his book Understanding Deaf Culture: In Search of Deafhood. While the precise meaning of the word remains deliberately broad—Ladd himself calls Deafhood a "process" rather than something finite and clear—it attempts to convey an affirmative and positive acceptance of being deaf.

== Definition ==
In the introduction of his 2003 book Understanding Deaf Culture, In Search of Deafhood, Ladd provides a description of the concept:

"It represents a process – the struggle by each Deaf child, Deaf family and Deaf adult to explain to themselves and each other their own existence in the world. In sharing their lives with each other as a community, and enacting those explanations rather than writing books about them, Deaf people are engaged in a daily praxis, a continuing internal and external dialogue. This dialogue not only acknowledges that existence as a Deaf person is actually a process of becoming and maintaining ‘Deaf’, but also reflects different interpretations of Deafhood, of what being a Deaf person in a Deaf community might mean."

Unlike deafness, which is often used to describe deaf people only in terms of their hearing loss, Deafhood asserts being deaf has a positive value for humankind and does not need to be cured like a disease. Many other deaf people, like Ella Mae Lentz, have used this term to explain a deaf person's unique personal journey to discover and understand themselves as a deaf person. Some in the deaf community, regardless of whether or not they had read Ladd's book, latched onto this concept as a way to unite the varied segments of the deaf community. Others have found the term too ambiguous to be helpful.

H-Dirksen L. Bauman quotes Ladd's definition of Deafhood in the introduction of the work Open Your Eyes: "Deafhood is not seen as a finite state but as a process by which deaf individuals come to actualize their deaf identity, positing that those individuals construct that identity around several differently ordered sets of priorities and principles, which are affected by various factors such as nation, era, and class."

According to Ladd, Deafhood requires deaf people to evaluate and liberate themselves from the oppression they have faced historically from the majority hearing society.

== Internationalist aspects of Deafhood ==
Paddy Ladd states that the heart of Deafhood is the international spirit. Communication is difficult on an international level because signed languages are not universal and each country can have one or more signed languages. Signing must be kept in the purest form possible, leaving out "accents" and other added effects so that both parties can be understood. In these settings, Ladd states "one's national identity begins a process of 'enlarging' itself into a transnational commonality of Deafhood." This points to the fact that there are two approaches to Deafhood. One is based on the effort in maintaining Deafhood within the boundaries of the oppressive deaf world as it was historically. The second approach is focused on trying to do the opposite—to enlarge the idea of what Deafhood might mean, taking ideas from anywhere and adapting them to deaf life.

== Historical views of Deafness ==
The concept is empowering for Deaf people because of the history of discrimination deaf individuals faced. Many deaf individuals faced audism, a new term meaning to discriminate based on the inability to hear. Deaf people historically have often been considered incapable of abstract thinking, since they lacked speech to express thoughts.

This tradition of thought was overturned during the period of Enlightenment. The ideology during this period was focused on scientific thinking. Two major schools of thought emerged concerning which method of education would benefit deaf children: with a visual sign language or with solely speaking and lipreading, manualism vs. oralism. Since sign language was associated with prejudices of inferiority, of (allegedly) being unequal with spoken languages, of (allegedly) lacking abstract vocabulary, and of (allegedly) possessing no grammar, the Oralist ideology was able to win significant levels of control in the education of the deaf.

Through this type of education, deaf children acquire certain negative notions of deafness, of superiority of speaking over signing, of hearing people being smarter. The stigma from this movement largely affects many deaf people today. There is a large need to disassociate from this oppressive thinking in their adult lives, when they participate in the deaf culture. When William Stokoe and other linguists showed that American Sign Language was a true language with its own grammatical structure, deaf people in America became more motivated to seek recognition from mainstream society on the legitimacy of American deaf culture and their status as a linguistic minority.

Deafhood has received recognition during the protests at Gallaudet University in Washington, D.C., in May and October 2006. Gallaudet University is still the world's only university in which all programs and services are specifically designed to accommodate deaf and hard of hearing students.

== See also ==
- Deaf culture
- Identity politics
- Islay (novel)
