= Deaf history =

The history of deaf people and deaf culture make up deaf history. The Deaf culture is a culture that is centered on sign language and relationships among one another. Unlike other cultures the Deaf culture is not associated with any native land as it is a global culture. While deafness is often included within the umbrella of disability, many view the Deaf community as a language minority. Throughout the years many accomplishments have been achieved by deaf people. To name the most famous, Helen Keller and Douglas Tilden were both deaf and contributed great works to culture.

Deaf people who know Sign Language are proud of their history. In the United States, they recount the story of Laurent Clerc, a Deaf educator, and Thomas H. Gallaudet, an American educator, coming to the United States from France in 1816 to help found the first permanent school for deaf children in the country. In the late 1850s there was a debate about whether or not to create a separate deaf state in the west. This deaf state would be a place where all deaf people could migrate, if chosen to, and prosper; however, this plan failed and the whole debate died.

Another well-known event is the 1880 Second International Congress on Education of the Deaf in Milan, Italy, where hearing educators voted to embrace oral education and remove sign language from the classroom. This effort resulted in strong opposition within Deaf cultures today to the oralist method of teaching deaf children to speak and lip read with limited or no use of sign language in the classroom. The method is intended to make it easier for deaf children to integrate into hearing communities, but there have been many arguments about whether the manual method (where the teachers teach Sign Language as the main way to communicate) or the Oral method (where the teachers make the student learn to speak) are better. Most people now agree that the Manual Method is the preferred method of Deaf communication. The use of sign language is central to the Deaf peoples as a cultural identity and attempts to limit its use are viewed as an attack.

== Bond history of the deaf culture ==
Sign language is the most important instrument for communication between deaf people and the Deaf culture. Using sign language deaf people can join social networks, local and globally, which join the Deaf culture together. Sign Language is a loose term for people that are deaf or hard of hearing and use signs to communicate. American Sign Language (ASL) is most closely related to the older form of French Sign Language, as Laurent Clerc, who was deaf and a teacher, was brought to the America's by Thomas Hopkins Gallaudet. Though Clerc brought French Sign Language, there was already sign language being used. Martha's Vineyard had more than average deaf people who had created their own Martha's Vineyard Sign Language. The French Sign Language and the Sign Language that was already in use, became American Sign Language. Deaf and Hard of Hearing communities are closely drawn together due to their culture and use of Sign Language. Sign languages, like the English language, are always changing. In the United States there are many varieties of Sign Language - from SEE sign (Signed Exact English), which follows English grammar rules when using modified ASL signs, to the Rochester Method, where every single word is finger spelled out in the English Language, generally without the use of signs. There is a grey area in between 'English' and 'ASL' known as Contact Variety (previously referred to as Pidgin Sign Language, or PSE), which uses any number of combinations of English word order/grammar combined with aspects of ASL (or SEE).

Another powerful bonding forced in the Deaf culture is athletics. Athletics open up a path to achievement where many others are shut out by prejudice due to the level playing field of certain sports. Athletics also create many networking opportunities for Deaf people across the United States to expand their social circles, due to the increased mobility that results from out-of-state competitions, because the deaf population is considerably small at the local scale. Deaf people participate in athletic activities to cultivate their cultural identity as Deaf people. In athletics, they can find solidarity where they are able to comfortably communicate with one another without barriers, embrace values and social norms natural for them and distinct from those in the hearing community, and allow for Deaf people to participate as coaches, athletes, and participants. The American Athletic Association of the Deaf (AAAD) is huge help for deaf people by representing Deaf clubs and organizations throughout the entire American states. The impact of sports in the deaf community can also be seen on the international level. The Deaflympics, sanctioned by the International Olympic Committee, are an elite international sporting event where deaf athletes from across the world compete against each other quadrennially.

== Famous living Deaf people ==
- Nyle DiMarco
- Ashley Fiolek
- Matt Hamill
- Braam Jordaan
- Chella Man
- Marlee Matlin
- Heather Whitestone
- Shoshannah Stern

== Timeline ==
- 1000 B.C.: Hebrew Law denied deaf rights. The Torah protected the deaf from being cursed by others, but did not allow them to participate fully in the rituals of the Temple. Special laws concerning marriage and property were established for deaf-mutes, but deaf-mutes were not allowed to be witnesses in the courts.
- c. 364 B.C.: Aristotle asserted that the "Deaf are born incapable to reason".
- c. 360 B.C.: Socrates, as quoted by Plato in Cratylus, mentioned the deaf who express themselves in gestures movement, depicting that which is light or a higher sphere by raising the hands or describing a galloping horse by imitating its motion.
- c. 44 B.C.: Quintus Pedius is the earliest deaf person in recorded history known by name.
- 135 A.D.: Saint Ovidius died; he is the patron saint of curing auditory disease.
- 131: Galen, a Greek physician from Pergamon wrote "Speech and hearing share the same source in the brain…"
- 738: In the Justinian Code, Emperor Justinian deduced that being deaf and mute are two different traits and are not always together.

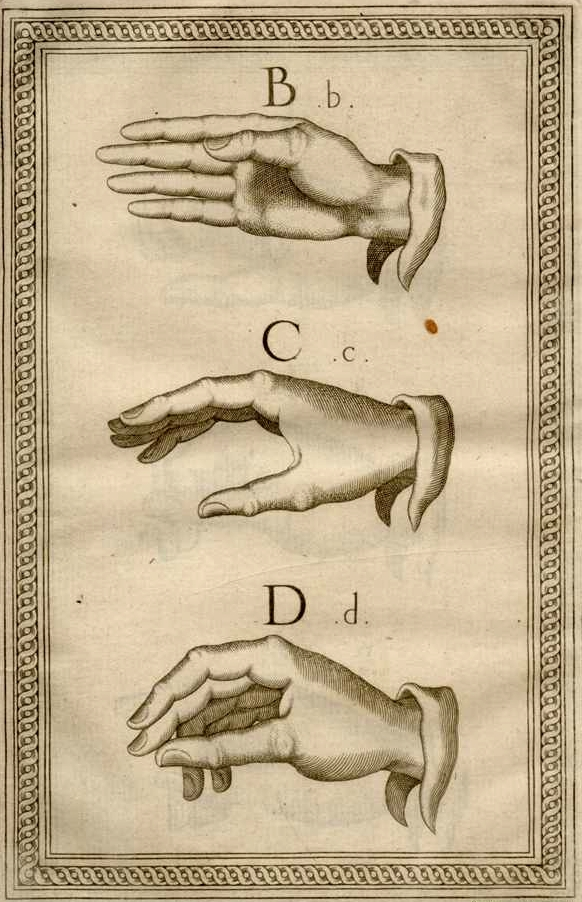
B, C, D. Engravings by Diego de Astor of Reducción de las letras y arte para enseñar a hablar a los mudos (Bonet, 1620)

- 1550: Pedro Ponce de León is credited as the first teacher of the deaf in history, as he developed a form of sign language and successfully taught speech to deaf people from birth.
- 1620: Juan Pablo Bonet published the first book on the subject of manual alphabetic signs for the deaf. However, it was not until 1885 that it was published in England, as Simplification of the letters of the alphabet and method of teaching deaf-mutes to speak.
- 1668: William Holder and John Wallis taught a deaf man to speak "plainly and distinctly, and with a good and graceful tone."
- 1778: Samuel Heinicke opened the first school for the deaf and mute in Germany.
- 1817: The American School for the Deaf was founded in Hartford, Connecticut. This was the first school for children with disabilities anywhere in the western hemisphere.
- 1857: In 1857, the 34th United States Congress passed H.R. 806, which chartered a grammar school as the Columbia Institution for the Instruction of the Deaf and Dumb and the Blind and funded tuition costs for indigent deaf, dumb (mute), or blind children belonging to the District of Columbia.
- 1849: Ferdinand Berthier became the first deaf person to receive the Legion of Honour.
- Late 1850s: In the late 1850s there was a debate about whether or not to create a separate deaf state in the west. This deaf state would be a place where all deaf people could migrate, if chosen to, and prosper; however, this plan failed and the whole debate died.
- 1860: The Victorian College for the Deaf was founded.
- 1864: The U.S. Congress authorized the Columbia Institution for the Instruction of the Deaf and Dumb and the Blind to confer college degrees, and President Abraham Lincoln signed the bill into law. Edward Miner Gallaudet was made president of the entire corporation, including the college. It was the first college in the world established for people with disabilities and is now known as Gallaudet University.
- 1880: The Second International Congress on Education of the Deaf happened in 1880 in Milan, Italy. It is commonly known as "The Milan Conference". The conference held deliberations from September 6, 1880, to September 11, 1880, declared that oral education was superior to manual education, and decided to ban the use of sign language in school. Following the conference, schools in Europe and the United States switched to using speech therapy without sign language as a method of education for the deaf.
- 1880: America's National Association of the Deaf was established.
- 1883: Ed Dundon became the first deaf player in Major League Baseball.
- 1883: Henry Winter Syle became the first deaf person to be ordained a priest in the Episcopal Church in the United States.
- 1896: The first woman (Julia Foley) was elected to the board of the United States National Association of the Deaf.
- 1911: Cal Rodgers became the first deaf pilot in the U.S. in 1911.
- 1924: The first Deaflympics, held in Paris in 1924, were the first ever international sporting event for athletes with a disability.
- 1932: The Italian National Agency for the Deaf was established in September 1932 in Padua, Italy, under the auspices of Ente Nazionale Sordomuti (ENS), the Italian Deaf Association.
- 1933-1945: The Third Reich forcibly sterilized hereditary deaf people in Germany and murdered many deaf people. Nevertheless, the role of Deaf people in Nazi Germany was more complicated than simply being victimized, as many Deaf Organizations during the Holocaust also collaborated with the Nazis.
- 1949: There were racially segregated schools for the deaf in 13 states.
- 1951: The World Federation of the Deaf was established in September 1951 in Rome, Italy, at the first World Deaf Congress, under the auspices of Ente Nazionale Sordomuti (ENS), the Italian Deaf Association.
- 1952: Gallaudet College started to admit black students.
- 1958: PL 85-905, which authorized loan services for captioned films for the deaf, became law in the U.S.
- 1960: Pierre Gorman of Australia became the first deaf person to receive a PhD at Cambridge University.
- 1960: The Junior United States National Association of the Deaf was established.
- 1960: William Stokoe published Sign Language Structure (1960), which was the first place the term "American sign language" was ever formally used. (The fully capitalized version: "American Sign Language," first appeared in the Buff and Blue in October 1963.)
- 1964: Robert Weitbrecht made the first successful teletypewriter phone call from one deaf person to another. It took several tries, until Weitbrecht's words appeared clearly: "Are you printing now? Let's quit for now and gloat over the success."
- 1964: Women members of the United States National Association of the Deaf were first allowed to vote.
- 1965: Black members were first accepted into the United States National Association of the Deaf.
- 1965: Carl G. Croneberg was the first to discuss analogies between Deaf and hearing cultures in his appendices C/D of the 1965 Dictionary of American Sign Language.
- 1965: The National Technical Institute for the Deaf at the Rochester Institute of Technology in Rochester, New York, was established by the U.S. Congress.
- Early 1970s: Paul Taylor created America's first local telephone relay system for the deaf.
- 1971: The October 31, 1971 episode of The French Chef (on its ninth anniversary) was the first U.S. television show to be captioned for deaf viewers.
- 1972: The first Miss Deaf America Pageant (called the Miss Deaf America Talent Pageant until 1976) was held during the United States National Association of the Deaf Convention in Miami Beach, Florida; the winner was Ann Billington.
- 1973: The Rehabilitation Act of 1973 includes a section requiring that disabled people be given access and equal opportunity to use the resources of organizations that receive federal funds or that are under federal contracts.
- 1974: Alice Lougee Hagemeyer created Deaf Awareness Week, later called Deaf Heritage Week, in which programs about deaf culture are held in libraries.
- 1975: Tom L. Humphries coined the term audism in his doctoral dissertation in 1975.
- 1975: 94-142 Education of All Handicapped Children Act passed.
- 1975: Board of Education of the Hendrick Hudson Central School District v. Rowley, 458 U.S. 176 (1982) is a United States Supreme Court case concerning the interpretation of the Education for All Handicapped Children Act of 1975. Amy Rowley was a deaf student, whose school refused to provide a sign language interpreter. Her parents filed suit contending violation of the Education for All Handicapped Children Act of 1975. In a 6–3 decision authored by Justice Rehnquist, the Court held that public schools are not required by law to provide sign language interpreters to deaf students who are otherwise receiving an equal and adequate education.
- 1977: The Rainbow Alliance of the Deaf is a nonprofit established in America in 1977 to, "establish and maintain a society of Deaf LGBT to encourage and promote the educational, economical, and social welfare; to foster fellowship; to defend our rights; and advance our interests as Deaf LGBT citizens concerning social justice; to build up an organization in which all worthy members may participate in the discussion of practical problems and solutions related to their social welfare." RAD now has chapters in the United States and Canada.
- 1978: The (American) National Center for Law and the Deaf was founded in Washington, D.C.
- 1980: Phyllis Frelich won the 1980 Best Actress Tony Award; she was the first deaf actor or actress to win a Tony Award.
- 1980: Alice Lougee Hagemeyer founded the unit now known as the Library Service to People who are Deaf or Hard of Hearing Forum, which is a unit within the American Library Association.
- 1980: Gertrude Galloway became the first female president of the United States National Association of the Deaf.
- 1981: Black Deaf Experience conference was held at Howard University in Washington, DC.
- 1982: America's National Black Deaf Advocates was established in 1982 "to promote the leadership development, economic and educational opportunities, social equality, and to safeguard the general health and welfare of Black deaf and hard-of-hearing people."
- 1982: In a 1982 case involving hereditary deafness, the Supreme Court of California was the first state supreme court to endorse the child's right to sue for wrongful life, but in the same decision, limited the child's recovery to special damages. This rule implies that the child can recover objectively provable economic damages, but cannot recover general damages like subjective "pain and suffering"—that is, monetary compensation for the entire experience of having a disabled life versus having a healthy mind and/or body.
- 1986: Baltimore Leather Association of the Deaf (BLADeaf), the first deaf leather club in America, was founded. Its original name was Maryland Lambda Alliance of the Deaf and it had three name changes before its name was changed to BLADeaf. It was founded by Elwood C. Bennett, Scott Wilson, and Harry "Abbe" Woosley, Jr.
- 1987: Marlee Matlin became the first deaf performer to win an Academy Award, as well as the youngest winner in the Best Actress category.
- 1988: Virginia Nagel was ordained as the first deaf female priest in the Episcopal Church.
- 1988: A Deaf President Now student demonstration was held at Gallaudet University in Washington, D.C. On March 13 Dr. I. King Jordan was named the first deaf president of the university.
- 1990: The Americans with Disabilities Act of 1990 was enacted.
- 1993: Rebecca Dubowe became the first deaf woman to be ordained as a rabbi in the United States.
- 1993: Zobrest v. Catalina Foothills School District, 509 U.S. 1 (1993), was a case before the United States Supreme Court. A deaf child and his parents sued the Catalina Foothills Unified School District in Arizona because the district refused to provide a sign language interpreter for the child after he transferred from a public school to Salpointe Catholic High School, a parochial school. Plaintiffs challenged the refusal to provide an interpreter on a variety of constitutional and statutory grounds, including the federal Individuals with Disabilities Education Act ("IDEA"), its Arizona counterpart, an IDEA regulation, the Arizona Constitution, and the Establishment and Free Exercise Clauses of the First Amendment to the United States Constitution. Plaintiffs successfully sought relief from a federal district court, which concluded "The service at issue in this case is part of a general government program that distributes benefits neutrally to any child qualifying as 'handicapped' under the IDEA, without regard to the 'sectarian-nonsectarian, or public-nonpublic nature' of the school the child attends". In a 5–4 decision, the Supreme Court reached the same issue, but reversed on the merits, finding that if it provided an interpreter the school district would not violate the Establishment Clause.
- 1995: Heather Whitestone, the first deaf Miss America, was crowned in 1995.
- 1996: Gallaudet College was renamed Gallaudet University.
- 1999: Beth Lockard was ordained as the first deaf pastor in the Evangelical Lutheran Church in America.
- 1999: Bates v. UPS (begun in 1999) was the first equal opportunity employment class action brought on behalf of deaf and hard of hearing workers throughout America concerning workplace discrimination. It established legal precedence for deaf and hard of hearing employees and customers to be fully covered under the Americans with Disabilities Act. Key findings included
1. UPS failed to address communication barriers and to ensure equal conditions and opportunities for deaf employees;
2. Deaf employees were routinely excluded from workplace information, denied opportunities for promotion, and exposed to unsafe conditions due to lack of accommodations by UPS;
3. UPS also lacked a system to alert these employees as to emergencies, such as fires or chemical spills, to ensure that they would safely evacuate their facility; and
4. UPS had no policy to ensure that deaf applicants and employees actually received effective communication in the workplace.

The outcome was that UPS agreed to pay a $5.8 million award and agreed to a comprehensive accommodations program that was implemented in their facilities throughout the country.

- 2005: India's National Association of the Deaf began.
- 2006: The Unity for Gallaudet movement occurred at Gallaudet University.
- 2006: In 2006 the American Library Association and the National Association of the Deaf declared that they would recognize March 13 to April 15 as National Deaf History Month.
- 2008: Darby Leigh became the first deaf rabbi ordained by the Reconstructionist movement.
- 2008: Lance Allred became the first deaf player in the NBA.
- 2009: International Week of the Deaf (IWDeaf) is celebrated annually across the world during the last full week of September since 2009.
- 2010: In July 2010 in Vancouver, Canada, the board of the 21st International Congress on the Education of the Deaf (ICED) formally voted to reject all of the 1880 Milan resolutions.
- 2011: This year the Conservative Movement unanimously passed the rabbinic responsa, "The Status of the Heresh [one who is deaf] and of Sign Language," by the Committee on Jewish Law and Standards (CJLS). This responsa declared that, among other things, "The Committee on Jewish Law and Standards rules that the deaf who communicate via sign language and do not speak are no longer to be considered mentally incapacitated. Jews who are deaf are responsible for observing mitzvot. Our communities, synagogues, schools, and camps must strive to be welcoming and accessible, and inclusive. Sign language may be used in matters of personal status and may be used in rituals. A deaf person called to the Torah who does not speak may recite the berakhot via sign language. A deaf person may serve as a shaliah tzibbur in sign language in a minyan whose medium of communication is sign language.
- 2011: Mary Whittaker became the first deaf person to be ordained into the Church of Scotland.
- 2012: The Supreme Court of India declared that a deaf and mute person need not be prevented from being presented as a witness in court merely on account of their physical disability. The court explained that a deaf and mute person can testify in writing or through gestures.
- 2012: It was announced that Netflix would offer closed captions on all TV and movie content from September 2014 as part of a settlement with a deaf viewer from Massachusetts (Lee Nettles) who sued the company. In 2012, a federal judge in Springfield, Massachusetts ruled in that lawsuit that Netflix and other online providers that serve the public are subject to the federal Americans with Disabilities Act, the first ruling in the country to recognize that Internet-based businesses are covered by the act.
- 2014: In 2014, the National Association of the Deaf filed a complaint with the United States Department of Justice Civil Rights Division alleging that thousands of lectures and other course content that had been made freely available via YouTube and iTunes by the University of California, Berkeley violated the Americans with Disabilities Act of 1990 because numerous lectures in the university's Massive open online course program featured automatically generated captions, which contained inaccuracies. In 2016, the Department of Justice concluded that the content would violate the ADA unless it was updated to conform to the current Web Content Accessibility Guidelines. In response, a university spokesperson stated that the costs of "captioning alone would exceed a million dollars" and that the university would comply with the DOJ order by removing all of the content from public access.
- 2015: In Pierce v. District of Columbia (2015), Ketanji Brown Jackson of the United States District Court for the District of Columbia ruled that the D.C. Department of Corrections violated the rights of a deaf inmate under the Americans with Disabilities Act because jail officials failed to provide the inmate with reasonable accommodations, or to assess his need for reasonable accommodations, during his detention in 2012. Jackson held that "the District's willful blindness regarding" Pierce's need for accommodation and its half-hearted attempt to provide Pierce with a random assortment of auxiliary aids—and only after he specifically requested them—fell far short of what the law requires."
- 2022: CODA became the first film featuring predominantly deaf actors in leading roles to win the Academy Award for Best Picture.
- 2022: Troy Kotsur became the first deaf man to win an Academy Award for acting; he won the Academy Award for Best Supporting Actor for his role in CODA.

== See also ==
- Deaf culture
- Deaf education
- Deaf studies
- History of deaf education in the United States
- History of deaf education in Africa
- History of institutions for deaf education
- List of deaf firsts
