= Laurent Clerc Award =

Annual award bestowed by Gallaudet University

The Laurent Clerc Award is an annual honor bestowed by Gallaudet University's Alumni Association to recognize a deaf person for "his or her outstanding contributions to society," and specifically to honor their achievements in the interest of deaf people. It is named for Laurent Clerc (1785–1869). It has been given to notable scientists and inventors, such as deaf scientist Robert Weitbrecht, to honor his contributions in developing the teleprinter and an acoustic coupler for the early computer modem. It is awarded by Gallaudet University's Alumni Association through its Laurent Clerc Cultural Fund.

== Recipients ==
- 2020 Ernest Elmer Hairston
- 2019 Nancy Rourke
- 2018 Drago Renteria
- 2017 Michelle A. Banks
- 2016 Nyle Lorenzo DiMarco
- 2015 Stephen C. Baldwin
- 2014 Alfred Sonnenstrahl
- 2013 Ann Silver
- 2012 Charles C. Baird
- 2011 Allison Schlesinger-Sepulveda, founder of National Center for Deaf Advocacy
- 2010 Barbara Kannapell
- 2009 Scott DeLoach
- (2008: No award)
- 2007 Roy "Ed" Bosson and Nathie L. Marbury
- 2006 Gertrude Scott Galloway
- (2005: No award)
- 2004 Carol Padden and Tom L. Humphries
- 2003 Kevin Nolan, Sr.
- 2002 Berta Foster
- 2001 Frank Lala
- 2000 Ben Soukup
- 1999 Sam Rittenberg
- 1998 Alexander "Sandy" Ewan
- 1997 Marvin J. Marshall
- 1996 Ausma Smits
- 1995 Earnest I. Okwara
- 1994 Albert Couthen
- 1993 Gilbert C. Eastman
- 1992 John B. Davis
- 1991 Otto B. Berg
- 1990 Leo M. Jacobs
- 1989 Jack R. Gannon
- 1988 Ernest Marshall
- 1987 Charley E. Whisman
- 1986 William J. Marra and Willard Shorter
- 1985 William T. Griffing and Florence B. Crammatte
- 1984 Jess M. Smith
- 1983 Gordon L. Allen
- 1982 Alan B. Crammatte
- 1981 Byron B. Burnes
- 1980 Frederick C. Schreiber
- 1979 Frank B. Sullivan
- (1977 & 1978: No award)
- 1976 Robert G. Sanderson
- 1975 Frank R. Turk
- 1974 Benjamin M. Schowe, Sr.
- 1973 James N. Orman
- (1972: No award)
- 1971 Robert H. Weitbrecht
- 1970 David Peikoff
