= Nebraska School for the Deaf =

Public school in Omaha, Nebraska, U.S.

Location
- 41°17′15.1″N 95°58′41.1″W

Information
- Type: Public
- Established: 1869
- Closed: 1998
- Grades: K–12
- Colors: Black and orange

The Nebraska School for the Deaf, or NSD, was a residential school for Deaf students in kindergarten through Grade Twelve at 3223 North 45th Street in Omaha, Nebraska, United States. Founded in 1869, the school closed in 1998. The school attracted national attention throughout its existence, first for controversial teaching practices and then for its closure.

== History ==
The NSD was founded in 1869 by a deaf man named William DeCoursey French on 23 acres (93,000 m^{2}) in North Omaha.

NSD was long a site for educational innovation. In 1893 the school's superintendent was cited for his commitment to encouraging teachers to use innovative techniques for classroom teaching, including gender integration and age-level isolation.

The Nebraska School for the Deaf basketball team was the first deaf school to have won an all-classes state championship in 1931, defeating teams from hearing schools to win the title. The team was coached by Nick Petersen, a graduate of the school.

=== American Sign Language controversy ===
In 1911 the school was the target of the Nebraska Legislature, which passed a bill that year that banned the use of American Sign Language at the school after intensive lobbying for the ban by the National Education Association and Alexander Graham Bell. Bell bankrolled the activities of an organization called the American Association to Promote the Teaching of Speech to the Deaf during this period. In 1911 school superintendent Frank Booth was quoted as writing in reference to American Sign Language, "That language is not now used in the school-room and I hope to do away with its use outside the school-room."

Using a rationalization that cited successes of the integrated style of combined signing and speech used in instruction at Gallaudet University, state legislators faced immediate opposition from students and alumni who argued for an identical system at NSD. After four years and several attempts to repeal Nebraska's law, there was no change, and the rule remained in force. Today this case is viewed as a rallying point for the deaf community in the United States.

=== Later years ===
In the 1970s, George Propp, a school faculty member, examined the spending practices of the school and predicted the school's coming financial difficulties. Discussing the current concepts of deaf education, Propp stated that deaf schools "will require a massive application of the resources that exist, as well as the development of technology that lies beyond our present dreams".

In 1985 there was a proposal to merge this school with the Nebraska School for the Visually Handicapped.

In the 1990s the school was the location of an innovative program that engaged high school students as storytellers with primary grade students at the school. The younger children became more involved with literature and the older students learned to select appropriate stories, prepare for storytelling, and select the appropriate communication mode.

=== Closure ===
Starting in 1984, state authorities at the Nebraska Department of Education attempted to close the NSD. Several organizations, including the National Association of the Deaf, the Nebraska Association of the Deaf and the Nebraska School for the Deaf Alumni Association, were involved in protesting the closure. The state was the target of much criticism from Nebraska's Deaf community, including a historic rally in which members of local, regional and national Deaf advocacy organizations descended on the Omaha Association of the Deaf Hall to devise strategies for keeping the school open.

After the 1997–98 school year the NSD closed due to diminishing enrollment and increasing per-student costs. That year, the school had fewer than 40 students enrolled.

The State of Nebraska has since established regional programs providing services once conducted by the school. The state also helps local school districts pay tuition and residential costs at nearby states' schools for the deaf for students who require a residential program according. Iowa School for the Deaf since 1998 admits deaf students from Nebraska.

== Campus ==
The school included dormitory facilities.

== Nebraska School for the Deaf Museum ==
The School for the Deaf Museum opened in the Administration Building, seen here on the left.

The 23-acre campus was sold in 1998 by the State of Nebraska to the Genesis Foundation for $2.5 million. Starting with an attempt to discredit the school in 1984 and leading to the closure of the school in 1998, the Nebraska School for the Deaf Alumni Association (NSDAA) fought to protect the interests of their alma mater. Today the NSDAA serves and encourages children in becoming more involved in deaf education, heritage and culture statewide, including operating the Nebraska School for the Deaf Museum located on the original campus. The campus was listed on the National Register of Historic Places in 2019.

Opened in 2001, the museum's exhibits focus on the history of the school, issues in education and communication within the deaf community and contributions made by deaf people in America. Four rooms have been outfitted to show period life at the school, including a 1930s school room, an athletic display, a 1950s teen club and a 1970s dorm room. There is also some art and woodwork created by school students in the early 20th century.

== Notable alumni ==
- Lyman Hunt, lobbyist who tried to prevent the passage of the infamous Nebraska Legislature Bill in 1911 that banned the use of American Sign Language at the school
- Nick Petersen, instructor and coach; led his team winning all-state championship with a 29–0 record
- Dr. George Propp, the only graduate to receive a doctorate; taught at NSD; later worked at the University of Nebraska–Lincoln
- Perry Seely, teacher at NSD; eventually established the California School for the Deaf in Riverside, California
- Alice Lougee Hagemeyer, the First Deaf Librarian for the Deaf Community in the United States. Founder of Friends of Libraries for Deaf Action (FOLDA), Hagemeyer also created the Library for Deaf Action (LDA) and advocated for the establishment of Deaf History Month.

== Notable faculty ==
- Earl Bates, television producer and local television show host
- Jack R. Gannon, deaf historian, author and educator
- Alvin E. Pope, former teacher; became superintendent of the New Jersey School for the Deaf in 1917, serving until 1939

== See also ==
- Education in Omaha
- History of Omaha
- Nebraska Center for the Education of Children Who Are Blind or Visually Impaired

== Bibliography ==
- Knudson, B.G. (Spring 2003). "Superintendents of American Residential Schools for the Deaf: A Profile". American Annals of the Deaf. 148 (1): 49–55. doi:10.1353/aad.2003.0005. PMID 12765090. S2CID 1022102. - Profile, Profile at PubMed
