= Council of Schools and Services for the Blind =

Consortium of specialized schools in Canada and the United States

The Council of Schools and Services for the Blind (COSB) is a consortium of specialized schools in Canada and the United States whose major goal is improving the quality of services to children who are blind and visually impaired.

COSB is a membership organization of special purpose schools for students who are blind or visually impaired, including those with multiple disabilities.

Schools and classrooms specialized approaches to instruction in small group settings ensure that the curriculum is fully accessible to each individual student. COSB schools specialise in teaching the skills that students use to gain independence at the same level as their sighted peers. Known as the Expanded Core Curriculum, these skills such as Orientation and Mobility (travel and movement skills) and the use of Assistive Technology become the tools students use to maximize learning in school and to be fully engaged in their homes and communities.

COSB schools are an example of why the Individuals with Disabilities Education Act (IDEA) calls for a range of educational placement options so that the learning opportunities of students are not restricted by the limitations of any one type of educational setting. Under IDEA students should have the option of attending a school that best matches their learning needs at a particular time in their educational career. An ideal balance is achieved when a student's local public school and that state's COSB school collaborate to allow the student to freely move between settings based upon educational need.

COSB schools provide a variety of services and supports. Key among these are specialized residential and day campuses in most states; short and longer-term program options; outreach services to students and educators in under-served areas; training and networking opportunities for families; professional development programs; the development of specialized curricula and teaching practices; research; braille production; and clearinghouses for instructional materials and public information on blindness.

== Member schools ==
- Alabama Institute for the Deaf and Blind
- Arizona State Schools for the Deaf and Blind
- Arkansas School for the Blind
- Braille Institute of America
- California School for the Blind
- Colorado School for the Deaf and Blind
- Florida School for the Deaf and Blind
- Georgia Academy for the Blind
- Governor Morehead School
- Hadley Institute for the Blind and Visually Impaired
- Idaho Educational Services for the Deaf and Blind
- Illinois School for the Blind and Visually Impaired
- Indiana School for the Blind and Visually Impaired
- Iowa Braille and Sight Saving School
- St. Joseph's School for the Blind
- Junior Blind of America
- Kansas State School for the Blind
- Kentucky School for the Blind
- Lavelle School for the Blind
- Louisiana School for the Visually Impaired
- Maryland School for the Blind
- Michigan Department of Education, Low Incidence Outreach (former Michigan School for the Blind)
- Minnesota State Academy for the Blind
- Mississippi School for the Blind
- Missouri School for the Blind
- Montana School for the Deaf and Blind
- Nebraska Center for the Education of Children Who Are Blind or Visually Impaired
- New Mexico School for the Blind and Visually Impaired
- New York Institute for Special Education
- North Dakota Vision Services/School for the Blind
- Ohio State School for the Blind
- Oklahoma School for the Blind
- Overbrook School for the Blind
- Perkins School for the Blind
- South Carolina School for the Deaf and Blind
- South Dakota School for the Blind and Visually Impaired
- Tennessee School for the Blind
- Texas School for the Blind and Visually Impaired
- Utah School for the Deaf and Blind
- Virginia School for the Deaf and the Blind
- Washington State School for the Blind
- West Virginia Schools for the Deaf and Blind
- Western Pennsylvania School for Blind Children
- Wisconsin Center for the Blind and Visually Impaired

== Official website ==
- https://www.cosbvi.org
