= Jack R. Gannon =

Author and historian of Deaf culture (1936–2022)

- Born: November 23, 1936; West Plains, Missouri, U.S.
- Died: March 14, 2022 (aged 85)
- Education: Gallaudet University
- Occupations: Author, historian, teacher, coach
- Awards: Laurent Clerc Award (1989)

Jack Randle Gannon (November 23, 1936 – March 14, 2022) was an American author and historian of Deaf culture. Deaf since age eight, he had chronicled the history and culture of Deaf people and organizations around the world, most notably in his 1981 book Deaf Heritage. Gannon was an educator at the Nebraska School for the Deaf and served for many years in administrative roles at Gallaudet University.

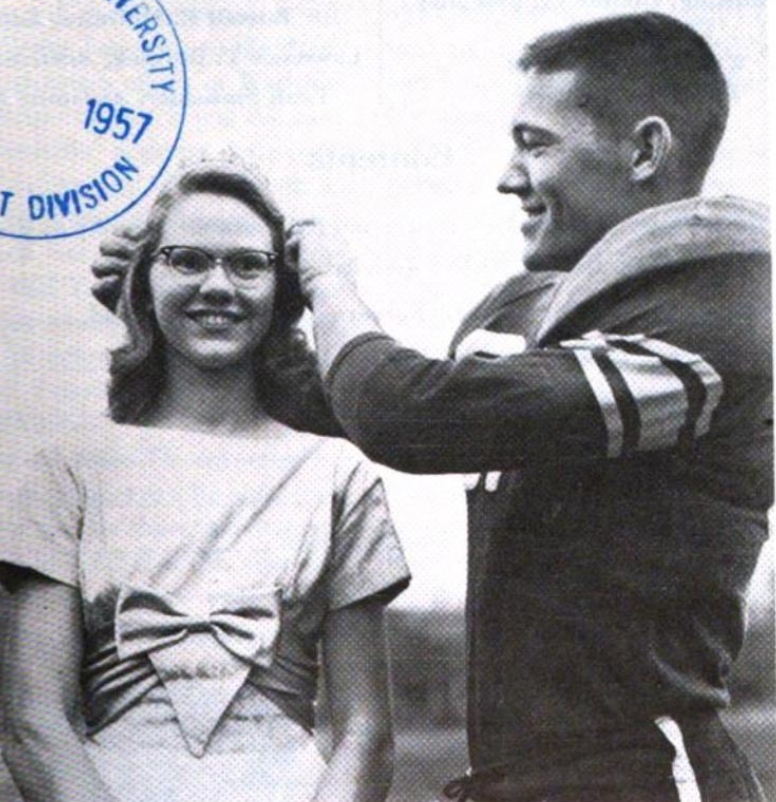
Rosalyn Faye Lee and Jack R. Gannon, from a 1957 publication

== Early life and education ==
Jack Gannon was born in West Plains, Missouri, on November 23, 1936. His family moved to Richmond, California during World War II, where his parents worked in the shipyards. Gannon became deaf at age eight after becoming ill with spinal meningitis. He enrolled in the California School for the Deaf in Berkeley. When the war ended, his family returned to Missouri; Gannon received most of his education at the Missouri School for the Deaf, where he graduated in 1954.

Gannon attended Gallaudet University and edited the student newspaper, The Buff and Blue. He met student Rosalyn Faye Lee at Gallaudet and they dated through their college years, getting married five days after graduating in 1959. Rosalyn collaborated with Jack on all of his writing projects; they have two children, Christine and Jeff.

== Career ==
After graduating and marrying, the Gannons moved to Nebraska to take jobs working at the Nebraska School for the Deaf. Jack Gannon worked at the school from 1959 to 1968, teaching graphic arts and coaching football. His football team played an undefeated season in 1967 for the first time in the school's history and Gannon was named Omaha's WOWT Coach of the Year. While in Nebraska Gannon served as president of the Nebraska Association of the Deaf and as the editor of The Deaf Nebraskan.

In 1968 the family returned to the Washington, D.C. area and Gannon became the Executive Secretary of the Gallaudet College Alumni Association. He held multiple positions through his career at Gallaudet, including Director of Alumni Relations. From 1989 until his retirement in 1996, Gannon served as the Special Assistant to the President for Advocacy, assisting president I. King Jordan.

== Scholarship ==
Gannon's Deaf Heritage: a Narrative History of Deaf America (1981) is a comprehensive account of the deaf in the United States since the founding of the American School for the Deaf in 1817. Deaf Heritage is considered a classic and cornerstone of Deaf cultural history.

His other books include The Week the World Heard Gallaudet, a photo chronicle of the 1988 Deaf President Now protests, and Through Deaf Eyes: a Photographic History of an American Community, coauthored with Douglas C. Baynton and Jean Lindquist Bergey. Gannon curated a traveling exhibit titled "History Through Deaf Eyes" which inspired a two-hour PBS documentary, the first comprehensive film on deaf history. In 2011 he published a history of the World Federation of the Deaf featuring achievements of the Deaf community and national organizations of the Deaf around the globe. His autobiography, Get Your Elbow Off the Horn, was published in 2020.

== Honors and legacy ==
Gannon was awarded an honorary Doctor of Letters degree by Gallaudet University in 1988. In 1989 Gannon received the Laurent Clerc Award, presented by Gallaudet for "outstanding contributions to society."

In 2011 Jack and Rosalyn Gannon received the International Solidarity Merit Award, First Class from the World Federation of the Deaf. National Association of the Deaf President Bobbie Beth Scoggins described the couple as a "dynamic duo whose commitment and perseverance enlighten the world about the history and accomplishments of the Deaf community both in the United States and globally".

Gannon was selected in 2014 as one of Gallaudet's "Visionary Leaders," fifteen prominent alumni honored to celebrate the university's 150th anniversary.

In their retirement, the Gannons lived on an 18th-century farmhouse in New Market, Maryland. Gannon died on March 14, 2022, at the age of 85.

== Bibliography ==
- Deaf Heritage : a Narrative History of Deaf America. Washington, D.C. : Gallaudet University Press, 2012 ISBN 0913072397 OCLC 421832587
- The Week the World Heard Gallaudet. Washington, D.C. : Gallaudet University Press, 1989 ISBN 0930323548 OCLC 18836090
- Through Deaf Eyes : a Photographic History of an American Community. Washington, D.C. : Gallaudet University Press, 2007 ISBN 1563683474 OCLC 1135285783
- World Federation of the Deaf : a History. Silver Spring, Md. : National Association of the Deaf, 2011 ISBN 9780913072967 OCLC 785424763
- Get Your Elbow Off the Horn : Stories Through the Years. Washington, D.C. : Gallaudet University Press, 2020 ISBN 9781944838652 OCLC 1141950071
