= Lawrence R. Newman =

American activist and writer (1925–2011)

Lawrence R. Newman (March 23, 1925 – July 4, 2011) was a prominent deaf activist, educator and author who served two terms as President of the National Association of the Deaf from 1986 to 1990. He was named "California Teacher of the Year" in 1968. An early proponent of bilingual education for the Deaf, he was the author of two books: Sands of Time: NAD Presidents 1880-2003, and I Fill this Small Space: The Writings of a Deaf Activist. Newman was awarded on honorary doctor of letters degree by Gallaudet University in 1978 in recognition of his extensive advocacy efforts as an educator and writer.

== Quotations ==
- "Education is to deaf people what the Golden Fleece was to Jason in mythology. He was willing to go through many trials and tribulations because if he could get the Golden Fleece, the throne in the kingdom of Greece would be his. If deaf people could get an education, their minds would be set free and the kingdom of the world would be theirs."

Cultural offices
Preceded by Lawrence H. Forestal	President of the National Association of the Deaf (United States); 1986–1990	Succeeded by Roz Rosen
