= Dorothy Miles =

British poet, activist (1931–1993)

- Born: Dorothy Squire; 19 August 1931; Holywell, Flintshire, Wales
- Died: 30 January 1993 (aged 61); London, England
- Education: Royal School for the Deaf; Mary Hare School
- Alma mater: Gallaudet College
- Occupation: Poet
- Writing career
- Language: English, British Sign Language, American Sign Language

Dorothy "Dot" Miles (née Squire; 19 August 1931 - 30 January 1993) was a Welsh poet and activist in the Deaf community. Throughout her life, she composed her poems in English, British Sign Language, and American Sign Language. Her work laid the foundations for modern sign language poetry in the United States and the United Kingdom. She is regarded as the pioneer of BSL poetry and her work influenced many contemporary deaf poets.

Miles studied at Gallaudet College. From 1957 to 1977, she lived in the United States and worked in education as well as writing. She joined the National Theatre of the Deaf in the US near the time of its founding in 1967. She later returned to the United Kingdom, where she became a key member of the British Deaf Community. By the early 1990s, Miles was experiencing manic depression. In 1993, Miles died by suicide, falling from a second-floor window.

== Biography ==
Miles (née Squire) was born 19 August 1931 in Holywell, Flintshire, North Wales, daughter of James and Amy Squire (née Brick). She was the youngest of five surviving children. In 1939 she contracted cerebrospinal meningitis, which left her deaf. She was educated at the Royal School for the Deaf and the Mary Hare School. In 1957, aged 25, she went to the United States to take up a place at Gallaudet College, sponsored in part by the British Deaf and Dumb Association. During her time at the college she became the first member of a junior class to be a member of the Gallaudet Phi Alpha Pi honour society, was in the 1961 edition of "Who's Who in American Colleges and Universities", edited the student magazines and won prizes for both her prose writing and poetry and for acting. Some of her work was published in The Silent Muse, an anthology of selected writings by deaf authors of the last 100 years. She also wrote the Bison's song.

She married a fellow student, Robert Thomas Miles, in September 1958. They separated in 1959. She graduated in 1961 receiving a BA with distinction. She worked in the United States as a teacher and counselor for deaf adults. In 1967, she joined the newly founded National Theatre of the Deaf (NTD) and began to create sign language poetry that deaf people – as well as hearing people – could appreciate. First a wardrobe mistress, she first acted with NTD in 1968 in their production of Dylan Thomas's Under Milk Wood, whose script she also helped to translate. Miles also worked with NTD's Little Theatre of the Deaf, which produced shows for children and teenagers.

Miles graduated from Connecticut College with a master's degree in 1974; her thesis was titled "A History of Theatre Activities in the Deaf Community of the U.S.".

In 1975, Miles left the NTD to work with the campus service for the deaf at California State University, Northridge. She returned to live in England in the autumn of 1977, after twenty years in the United States. Miles was soon involved in the National Union of the Deaf's pioneering television programme Signs of Life for Open Door (in which she performed her poem "Language for the Eye") and was involved in discussions that led to the See Hear television series. She took work with the British Deaf Association, working on various projects. She compiled the first teaching manual for BSL tutors and became involved in setting up the Council for the Advancement of Communication with Deaf People (CACDP). She also worked on the BDA dictionary.

For a while she worked as a self-employed writer, lecturer and performer, becoming involved in promotion of sign language teaching and training of tutors and deaf theatre. She was involved in setting up and then teaching on the British Sign Language Tutor Training Course – the first university course for training deaf people to become BSL tutors. She also wrote the best-selling BBC book BSL – A beginner's guide, which was published to complement the television series.

== Death ==
By the early 1990s, Miles was a key figure in the British Deaf Community. She died on 30 January 1993 when she fell from the window of her second-floor flat. The inquest at St. Pancras Coroner's Court concluded that she killed herself while experiencing manic depression.

== Legacy ==
Miles is regarded as a key figure in the literary heritage of sign language and the deaf community. It has been suggested that she is the source of most of the sign language poetry performed today. She was passionate about deaf issues, culture and sign language and longed to bridge the gap between deaf and hearing people.

She features as one of a series of portraits of notable deaf artists painted by Nancy Rourke.

The Dorothy Miles Cultural Centre was established by a group of both Deaf and hearing friends in her memory. It was an organisation based in Surrey, spreading British Sign Language and raising Deaf Awareness in the community. This mantle was taken up by Dot Sign Language, which took over when the Cultural Centre closed. Dot Sign Language continues to teach qualifying British Sign Language courses in Woking and Guildford, as well as Deaf Awareness workplace training. They spend many hours working in the community, in Schools, Scout troops, Brownies and all other youth groups, so that all youngsters can see BSL in action, in real life and interact with Deaf people. They have such a high pass rate and such teaching methods that they were shortlisted for award and recognition in January 2017 by the examining body 'Signature'.

In April 2024 a Purple Plaque (celebrating Remarkable Women in Wales) was unveiled outside Miles's childhood home, 27 Westbourne Avenue, Rhyl by her niece, Liz Deverill.

On 19 August 2024, the 93rd anniversary of her birth, Miles was honoured with a Google Doodle created by Deaf artist Youmee Lee.

== Bibliography ==
- BBC. British Sign Language: A Beginner's Guide. Produced to accompany the BBC Television series, British Sign Language. It includes a foreword by HRH The Princess of Wales. BBC Television.
- Miles, Dorothy (1 December 1976). Gestures: Poetry in Sign Language. Joyce Media. ISBN 0-917002-12-1.
- Miles, Dorothy (27 July 1998). Bright Memory. Doncaster: British Deaf History Society. ISBN 1-902427-02-5.
