= Roz Rosen =

American Deaf advocate and academic administrator

- Born: February 22, 1943; The Bronx
- Alma mater: Gallaudet University; Catholic University of America
- Occupation: Teacher, academic administrator, activist
- Employer: Gallaudet University; National Center on Deafness (2006–2014)

Roslyn "Roz" Goodstein Rosen is an American advocate for the Deaf community. Rosen was the president of the National Association of the Deaf from 1990 to 1993 and was a board member for the World Federation of the Deaf from 1995 to 2003. She served in multiple academic administrator roles throughout her career, including as the Vice President for Academic Affairs at Gallaudet University, and was the director of the National Center on Deafness from 2006 to 2014.

== Early life and education ==
Roslyn Goodstein was born in The Bronx on February 22, 1943. Both she and her brother were born deaf to deaf parents; they were raised learning American Sign Language and English.

She attended the Lexington School for the Deaf in Queens, graduating in 1958. At the time, Lexington used exclusively oral education, but the students used sign language when instructors were not present. She earned two degrees from Gallaudet College: a bachelor's degree in art education (1962) and master's degree in the education of the deaf (1964). Rosen performed in several productions while in Gallaudet's drama club. Later she went on to earn a Ph.D. in education from Catholic University of America (1980). Her dissertation was titled Recommendations on Educational Placement and Services for Hearing-Impaired Students by Four Types of Administrators.

She and her husband, Herbert Rosen, met while they were both students at Gallaudet and were married in 1961. They have three children.

== Career ==
Rosen started her career as a rehabilitation counselor at the Department of Vocational Rehabilitation, working there from 1964 to 1966. For the next decade she worked for several organizations in Washington, D.C., including as a sign language instructor for the Bureau of the Education of the Handicapped, a films specialist for Captioned Films for the Deaf, and in several roles for the Model Secondary School for the Deaf. In 1977 and 1978, she coordinated Gallaudet College's program to educate people about the recently passed Education for All Handicapped Children Act. From 1978 to 1983, Rosen served as the Director of the Special School of the Future, a program sponsored by the W. K. Kellogg Foundation and Gallaudet, working with demonstration schools.

Her connection to Gallaudet continued when she was appointed Dean of the College of Continuing Education in 1981. She served in that role until 1993, when she was named vice president for Academic Affairs. She was the first female Deaf Dean and the first Deaf female provost at the Gallaudet. In that position, Rosen led all university academic and student support programs, undergraduate and graduate degree programs, as well as continuing education and outreach programs. Rosen resigned as vice president in 1999.

In 1990, Rosen was elected president of the National Association of the Deaf, making her the second deaf female president of the organization. In that role she was a frequent representative for the American Deaf community, including providing her expertise on the topic of cochlear implants for the show 60 Minutes in 1992. After her term as NAD president was up in 1993, she went to on become a board member for the World Federation of the Deaf from 1995 to 2003 and an international officer of the federation from 2005 to 2006. Simultaneously, Rosen served as the executive director of the Council on Education of the Deaf from 2000 to 2006.

Rosen became the director of the National Center on Deafness, located on the campus of California State University Northridge, in 2006. After her retirement in 2014, she continued to serve on multiple boards and wrote the children's book Deaf Culture Fairy Tales in 2017.

Cultural offices
Preceded by Lawrence R. Newman	President of the National Association of the Deaf (United States); 1990–1993	Succeeded by Benjamin J. Soukup
