= Electoral firsts in Germany =

This article lists electoral firsts in Germany.

== Women ==
=== First female chancellor ===
- Angela Merkel in 2005

=== First female defence minister ===
- Ursula von der Leyen in 2013

=== First female health minister ===
- Elisabeth Schwarzhaupt in 1961

=== First black woman MP ===
- Awet Tesfaiesus in 2021

=== First Moroccan woman ===
- Sanae Abdi in 2021

== LGBT ==
=== First gay Member of the Bundestag ===
- Herbert Rusche in 1985

=== First gay Vice-Chancellor ===
- Guido Westerwelle in 2009

=== First lesbian Member of the Bundestag ===
- Jutta Oesterle-Schwerin in 1987

=== First lesbian member of the Federal Cabinet ===
- Barbara Hendricks in 2013

=== First bisexual Member of the Bundestag ===
- Ricarda Lang in 2021

=== First transsexual Member of the Bundestag ===
- Nyke Slawik and Tessa Ganserer in 2021

== Ethnic minorities ==
=== First MPs of African descent ===
==== Senegalese ====
- Karamba Diaby in 2013
- Charles M. Huber in 2013

=== First MPs of Asian descent ===
==== Iranian ====
- Sahra Wagenknecht in 2005

==== Korean ====
- Ye-One Rhie in 2021

=== First MPs of European descent ===
==== Bosnian ====
- Adis Ahmetovic and Jasmina Hostert in 2021

=== First MPs with disabilities ===
- Heike Heubach (deaf) in 2024
