= DCMP =

DCMP may refer to:

- DC Motema Pembe, a football club of the Democratic Republic of the Congo
- Described and Captioned Media Program
- Deoxycytidine monophosphate
- Disaster Case Management Program, a federally funded program administered by the Department of Homeland Security's Federal Emergency Management Agency (FEMA).
- The Dulles Corridor Metrorail Project, also known as the Silver Line (Washington Metro)
