= Glenn Anderson (disambiguation) =

Glenn Anderson (born 1960) is a retired Canadian pro hockey player.

Glenn Anderson may also refer to:

- Glenn M. Anderson (1913–1994), former Lieutenant Governor of California and United States congressman
  - Glenn M. Anderson Freeway or Interstate 105
- Glenn S. Anderson (born 1954), Michigan State Senate member
- Glenn Anderson (Washington politician) (born 1958)
- Glenn B. Anderson (born 1945), first Black deaf man to earn a doctoral degree
