= Iowa Braille and Sight Saving School =

Coordinates: 42.162205°N 92.032732°W

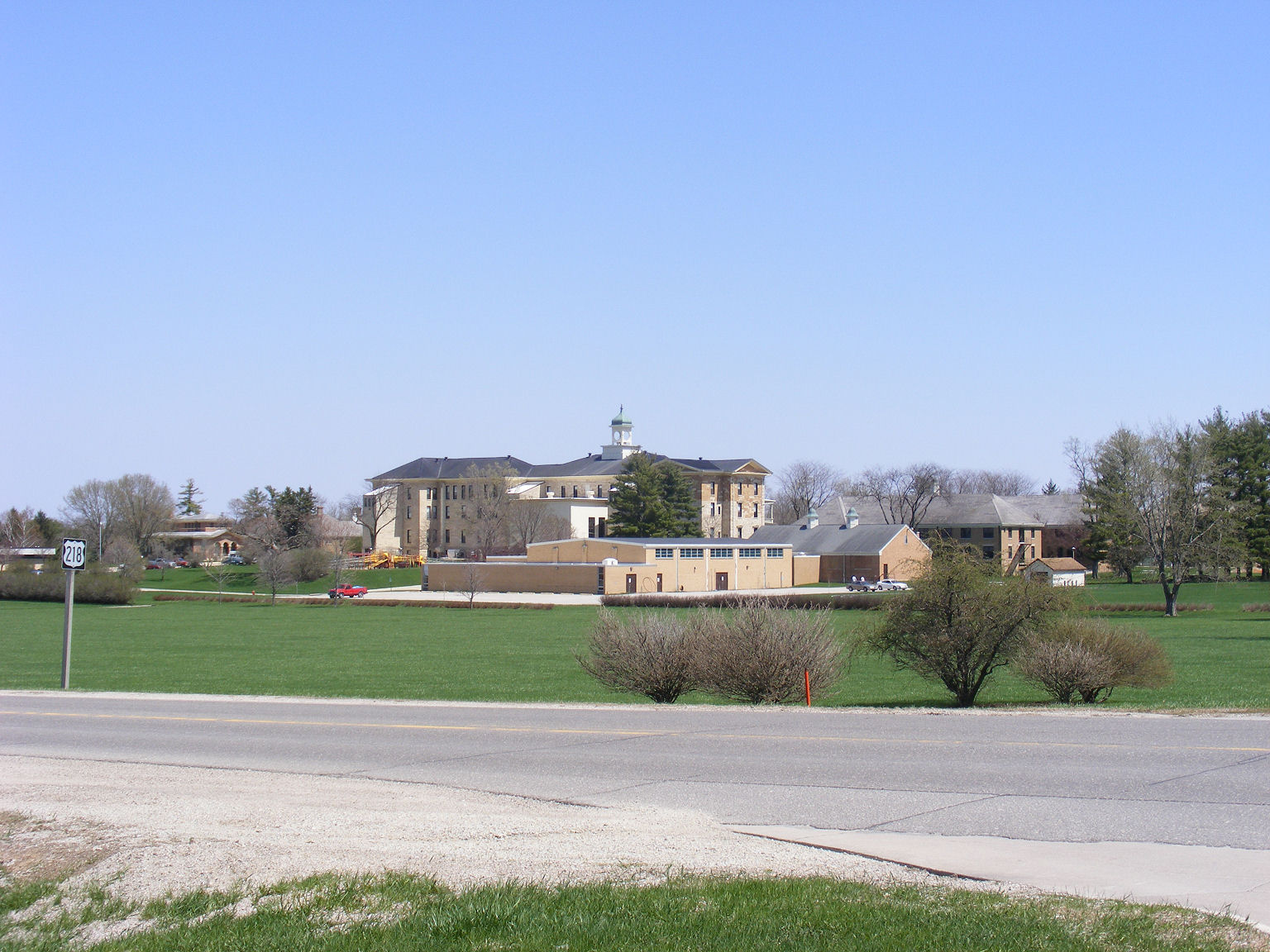

Location
- 1002 G Avenue; Vinton, Iowa; United States

Information
- Type: Public special school
- Established: 1852; 174 years ago
- School district: Iowa Board of Regents
- Mascot: Rams
- Website: Official Website

Iowa Braille and Sight Saving School was a state-operated school for the blind. It was replaced by the Iowa Educational Services for the Blind and Visually Impaired. Vinton, Iowa, hosted the school and continued as host of the state agency that replaced it until 2020.

Students from all over Iowa were housed and educated at the school. During its existence, students in special education were entitled to educational programming until age 21. Students could attend the school for short-term enrollment for specialized skill development and training. Students attended classes that met individual educational needs. Some students attended select classes at the local public school. Instruction was provided in specialized areas of core curriculum for students with visual impairments, which include compensatory skills, orientation and mobility, social interaction skills, independent living skills, career education/work experience, use of assistive/adaptive technology and visual efficiency skills.

The school opened in 1852 as the Iowa College for the Blind. Mary Ingalls, sister of Laura Ingalls Wilder (author of the Little House on the Prairie series), attended the school, graduating in 1889. Her stay was typical for blind students of that era. In the novel Little Town on the Prairie, Wilder describes her sister's curriculum at the college as "political economy, and literature, and higher mathematics, and sewing, knitting, beadwork and music." The subsequent novel These Happy Golden Years mentions Mary's use of a Braille slate and attendance at the college's chapel.

The eclectic musician Moondog studied with composer Burnet Tuthill at the school in the 1950s.

As of fall 2011, IBSSS no longer had a residential component. Instead, all school-age visually impaired children in Iowa received specialized instruction in their local school districts from professionals employed by the agency, whose administrative offices were located in the old school building in Vinton.

== Transformation into statewide support organization ==
As part of its transformation from a residential school to a state agency, it underwent a name change to the Iowa Statewide System For Vision Services. The plan called for students to continue to come to the school for short-term summer programs in the future, though the difficulty of maintaining trained staff without an ongoing residential program affected the viability of such programs.

Iowa Educational Services for the Blind & Visually Impaired (IESBVI), is now headquartered in Council Bluffs.

The school was a member of Council of Schools and Services for the Blind (COSB), a commitment that is carried on by the IESBVI.

== Development of Campus & Facilities ==
The school had dormitories for students.

Since 2008, the North Central Region headquarters for AmeriCorps National Civilian Community Corps (NCCC) has been located on the campus. During the July 2011 derecho, the campus and buildings sustained considerable damage.

The City of Vinton bought the former facility for $1 in 2020. The city plans to establish offices and areas for special events.
