= Missouri School for the Deaf =

School in Fulton, Missouri, U.S.

Coordinates: 38.8484°N 91.9408°W

Missouri School for the Deaf (MSD) is a school in Fulton, Missouri, that has served deaf and hard-of-hearing students in the state since 1851.

It has grades K–12 and serves students aged 5 to 21. The internal academic divisions are: Stark Elementary School, Wheeler Middle School, and Wheeler High School.

In 1997 its enrollment was about 65 or 70 students, with about 33% having additional disabilities.

== Campus ==
Elementary and middle school students are in cottages built in 1997; they are Gannon Cottage, named after Jack R. Gannon; Redden Cottage, after Laura Redden Searing (Howard Glyndon); and Reid Cottage, after teacher William Cooper Reid. Before 1997 they were in Stark Hall's dormitories. High school students are in Kerr Hall, named after MSD founder William Dabney Kerr; and Tate Hall, named after MSD superintendent James Nolley Tate. They have separate sides for female and male students.

== Athletics ==
As of 1997 MSD's sports teams usually play other schools categorized as 1A, and it plays against other schools for the deaf in the Great Plains tournament.

== Notable alumni ==
- Jack R. Gannon, teacher, coach, and author
- CJ Jones, actor
