= Nebraska Center for the Education of Children Who Are Blind or Visually Impaired =

Special school in Nebraska, United States

Coordinates: 40°41′12″N 95°51′22″W

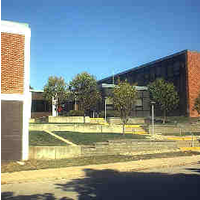

The Nebraska Center for the Education of Children Who Are Blind or Visually Impaired (NCECBVI) is located in Nebraska City, Nebraska, United States. It was founded in 1875 and serves children from infancy to adults age 21. NCECBVI's program offers the expertise and specialized skills of the center's staff to blind, visually impaired, and other disabled students in residential, day, and outreach settings. Services are provided to local school districts, students, families, teachers, and other support staff, upon request. It was previously the Nebraska School for the Visually Handicapped (NSVH).

The center offers residential services. Services are also offered to provide intense training in specific skills related to the blind or visually impaired such as Braille, technology, orientation and mobility, and daily living skills. The duration of this service varies due to the needs of the student, family and local education agency. The center provides:

- Education for academic, functional, and multi-disabilities students until age 21
- Intense training in specific skills
- Continuation of resident school academics
- Assessment and evaluations
- Training for transition to the resident's school district

The center is a member of the Council of Schools for the Blind.

== History ==
The Nebraska Legislature passed an act to create the Institute for the Blind at Nebraska City on February 19, 1875, two years after Samuel Bacon had traveled to Nebraska to persuade the legislature to do so. According to the law, the school had to have at least 10 acres (4.0 ha) of space, be less than 1 mile (1.6 km) from the Otoe County Courthouse, and for the community of Nebraska City to generate and pay $4,000. Bacon used much of his own funds to establish the school as the legislature did not appropriate much.

There were initially three students enrolled.

In 1985 there was a proposal to merge this school with the Nebraska School for the Deaf.

It received its current name in 1999. The Nebraska Department of Education wished to change it from being a boarding school to providing services for blind students in regular public schools throughout Nebraska. Today it remains a boarding school while also servicing the visually impaired students throughout the state.

== Student body ==
In the 1990s the graduating classes had numbers as few as three students each. In 1998 it had 17 students.

== In media ==
In 1976, Nebraska ETV produced a documentary about the school titled Look Where We're Going.

== See also ==
- Council of Schools for the Blind
