= Glenn B. Anderson =

American writer

Glenn B. Anderson is an American writer who was the first Black Deaf man to earn a doctoral degree. Anderson is the author of a book titled Still I Rise: The Enduring Legacy of Black Deaf Arkansans Before and After Integration. He is a member of the board for the National Black Deaf Advocates and an editor for the Arkansas Association of the Deaf newsletter.

== Early life and education ==
Anderson was born on October 16, 1936 or 1945, in inner-city Chicago, Illinois. He contracted pneumonia at the age of 7 and due to complications from the illness, he became deaf. Anderson attended a program with 150 other deaf students for both elementary school and middle school. For high school he attended Parker High School in a program with 15 other deaf students. Minimal support was provided and thus he struggled with understanding the teacher in class. He found a way to succeed academically and received honors and an award for scholar-athlete of the year. He graduated from Parker High School in 1964. Anderson attended Northern Illinois University with a concentration in physical education. After one semester he transferred to Gallaudet University. He joined various clubs and student athletic teams including basketball, track and student body government. Anderson changed his major from physical education to psychology. In 1968 he graduated from Gallaudet and had the only black family at commencement. In 1970, he earned his master's degree from University of Arizona. In 1982, Anderson became the first Black Deaf man to earn a doctorate degree as he graduated from New York University with a Ph.D in Rehabilitation Counseling.

== Career ==
Anderson started his counseling career in 1970 after graduating with a master's degree in Rehabilitation Counseling. He got a job in 1970 as a Vocational Rehabilitation Counselor in Detroit, becoming the first deaf person to be hired for that position in Michigan. After working for two years in that position, he started work at New York University in the Deafness Research and Training Center. He worked as an associate research scientist there from 1972 through to 1975. While pursuing his Ph.D., he worked at LaGuardia Community College, City University in New York. He worked as a Coordinator of Continuing Education Programs from 1975 through to 1982, the same year he obtained his Ph.D. He has participated in countless national workshops and conferences, and has led multiple university courses. In 2002–2005, Anderson was appointed by President George W. Bush as a member of the National Council on Disability. He is a member of the board for the National Black Deaf Advocates and an editor for the Arkansas Association of the Deaf newsletter.

Anderson has a book titled "Still I Rise: The Enduring Legacy of Black Deaf Arkansans Before and After Integration". This book was published in 2006 and is accompanied in a DVD format using American Sign Language.

== Personal life ==
Anderson met his wife, Karen, when he was a student at New York University. They later had two children. Anderson's son Jamaal Anderson played as a defensive end for the National Football League.

== Awards and honors ==
Title	Year received
Scholar-Athlete of the Year Award from Parker High School	1964
American Athletic Association of the Deaf Hall of Fame	1992
Frederick C. Schreiber Leadership Award by the National Association of the Deaf	1994
Linwood Smith Humanitarian Award by the National Black Deaf Advocates	1995
Gallaudet University Athletic Hall of Fame	1995
National Hall of Fame for Persons with Disabilities	2004
Alice Cogswell Award for valuable service to Deaf people	2007
Lifetime Achievement Award by the National Black Deaf Advocates	2012
