= Gertrude Scott Galloway =

American educator and administrator

- Born: November 12, 1930; Washington, D.C.
- Died: July 17, 2014; Austin
- Occupations: Educator, official
- Awards: Laurent Clerc Award (2006)

Gertrude Scott Galloway (November 12, 1930 – July 17, 2014) was an American educator and administrator working with deaf children. She was the first female president of the National Association of the Deaf. She is among the first deaf women to head a school for the deaf in the United States. Galloway was an advocate for deaf women throughout her life.

== Early life ==
Gertrude Scott was born on November 12, 1930, in Washington, D.C. She was born deaf to deaf parents and deaf grandparents. She was enrolled in Kendall Demonstration Elementary School at age six; since she had been raised using American Sign Language, the school's teaching through oralism proved frustrating.

She entered Gallaudet College at age fifteen, just weeks after her father (Roger O. Scott) died. At Gallaudet she was active in drama productions, costarring with deaf theatre icon Bernard Bragg; she also served as the representative of women in her class as the head senior. She earned her Bachelor of Arts in Deaf Education from Gallaudet in 1951. She went on to receive a Master of Education degree in 1972 from Western Maryland College as well as a doctorate in Special Education Administration in 1993 from Gallaudet.

== Career ==
Galloway married shortly after graduating with her undergraduate degree in 1951 and raised three children, working occasional jobs as a keypunch operator and substitute teacher. After a "devastating" divorce, Galloway and her children moved to Frederick, Maryland in 1970, where she took a position teaching math at the Maryland School for the Deaf. When the Columbia campus of the school opened in 1973, she was offered the position of assistant principal. She held that role until 1990, establishing programs for elementary-aged students and students with multiple disabilities. During the 1970s and 1980s she also taught psychology and women's studies at Hood College and ASL for Western Maryland College.

In January 1991 she became the Marie H. Katzenbach School superintendent for the Deaf, becoming the first deaf superintendent in the school's 107-year history. She follows Jane Fernandes, as one of the first deaf women to head a school for the deaf in the United States. In that position, she worked to make the school a resource center for the deaf in New Jersey and advocated for deaf children to have quality interactions with other children, both deaf and hearing.

== Service ==
She became the first female president of the National Association of the Deaf, serving from 1980 to 1982. While in that role, she worked to establish a stronger political network for NAD and increase the visibility of other women in the organization. She also led efforts to ensure every television broadcaster provided substantial closed captioning, organizing a national rally against CBS. She later went on to become the first female president of the Conference of Educational Administrators of Schools and Programs for the Deaf (1994-1996) as well as the first female president of the Deaf Seniors of America (1999-2005).

From 1986 to 1988, she was one of the thirteen experts to serve on the National Commission on Education of the Deaf. The 1988 final report of that committee, "Toward Equality: Education of the Deaf," indicated that education in the U.S. was not sufficiently meeting the needs of deaf students and drafted recommendations including the recognition of ASL as an official language. Galloway chaired the National Commission on Equal Educational Opportunities for Deaf Children, working to implement the recommendations of the earlier commission.

== Death and legacy ==
Galloway died July 17, 2014, in Austin, Texas. After her death, former NAD president Roz Rosen remarked on Galloway's legacy: "Gertie was a trailblazer in every sense of the word. She was a living legend and role model for everyone. Her ability to pinpoint and reframe the issues was amazing, such as 'The Deaf child has the right to be Deaf.' She also was an awesome storyteller with a wicked sense of humor."

She earned multiple awards throughout her life. In 1995 she earned the Bailer Award from Western Maryland College for her "significant contribution to the field of education." The Laurent Clerc Award, given by Gallaudet University for "outstanding contributions to society," was awarded to Galloway in 2006. Galloway was also selected as one of Gallaudet University's "Visionary Leaders", fifteen prominent alumni honored to celebrate the school's 150th anniversary in 2014.

The Gertrude S. Galloway Award for Deaf Woman of the Year, awarded by Deaf Life magazine, "honors an outstanding stereotype-breaker, teacher, administrator, superintendent, leader." In 2020, Gallaudet University awarded the first Gertrude Scott Galloway Advocacy and Social Justice Award, presented annually to a "strong advocate for social justice for deaf or hard of hearing people."
