= List of deaf firsts =

This is a list of deaf firsts noting the first time that a deaf person achieved a given historical feat. This list also includes some deafblind persons.

== Academics ==
- Ferdinand Berthier, French deaf educator, intellectual and political organiser, first deaf person to receive the Legion of Honour (1849)
- Helen Keller, American author, disability rights advocate, political activist and lecturer, first deafblind person to earn a Bachelor of Arts degree (1904)
- Pierre Gorman, Australian librarian, academic and educator of children with disabilities, first deaf person to receive a PhD at Cambridge University (1960).
- Geraldine Lawhorn, American musician, actress and instructor, first deafblind African-American person to earn a college degree (1983)
- Irving King Jordan, American educator, first deaf president of Gallaudet University (1988)
- Haben Girma, American lawyer and advocate, first deafblind graduate of Harvard Law School (2013).

== Sports ==
- Ed Dundon, American baseball pitcher and first deaf player in MLB (1883-1884)
- Lance Allred, American basketball forward and first legally-deaf NBA player (2008)

== Actors ==
- Marlee Matlin, American actress, first deaf winner of an Academy Award for Best Actress for her role in Children of a Lesser God (1986)
- Troy Kotsur, American actor, first deaf man to win an Academy Award for acting; he won the Academy Award for Best Supporting Actor for his role in CODA (2022)

== Other ==
- Henry Winter Syle, American cleric, first deaf person to be ordained a priest in the Episcopal Church in the United States (1883).
- Wilma Newhoudt-Druchen, South African politician, first deaf female Member of Parliament in the world
- Heather Whitestone, first deaf woman to win the title of Miss America (1995)
- Heike Heubach, first deaf Member of the German Bundestag (2024)

== See also ==
- Deaf history
- List of deaf people
