= Nancy Rourke =

American painter

- Citizenship: United States
- Education: BFA in Graphic Design & Painting (1982) and MFA in Computer Graphics & Painting (1986) at Rochester Institute of Technology (NTID)
- Occupations: Artist and advocate
- Notable work: Deaf Artist Series: Nancy Rourke (2014)
- Awards: Laurent Clerc Award by Gallaudet University’s Alumni Association (2019)>br/> 2024 Disability Futures Fellow - part of a cohort supported by the Ford Foundation and Mellon Foundation
- Website: nancyrourke.com

Nancy Rourke (born c. 1950s) is an internationally known Deaf American painter, muralist, and activist whose oil paintings and public artworks explore Deaf identity, cultural affirmation, and social justice. She was trained in painting and graphic design at Rochester Institute of Technology (RIT), Rourke worked for two decades as a graphic designer before returning to fine art. Since the late 2000s, she has been closely associated with the Deaf View/Image Art (De'VIA) movement and developed a distinctive visual language often described as ‘Second Wave of De’VIA’ and ‘Rourkeism’.

== Early life and education ==
Rourke grew up in San Diego, California. Her mother was from Michigan, and her father was an enrolled member of the federally recognized Mesa Grande Band of Mission Indians in the Kumeyaay Nation. She pursued formal art education through programs connected with the National Technical Institute for the Deaf and Rochester Institute of Technology, studying painting, computer graphics, and design. After a long career as ~~a~~ corporate graphic designer, she returned to full-time painting and community-focused art practice around 2009–2011, shifting her emphasis from graphic design to artwork explicitly rooted in Deaf culture and De'VIA principles. Two of her greatest inspirations were Jean Michel Basquiat and Jacob Lawrence, and their work in the civil rights movement.

== Career ==
Rourke's career began with various graphic design jobs at companies such as Xerox, 20th Century Fox, and Microsoft. After 2009, she became a full-time artist with a focus on Deaf View/Image Art after she began to explore deaf culture. She additionally works to bring the Deaf View/Image Art curriculum into schools for art teachers. She hosts retreats, galleries, and works through several artist-in-residencies in schools nationwide. Some of her experience also pertains to assisting deaf inmates who did not have access to interpreters or video phones in prison, and creating programs to expand their artistic abilities.

In 2014, she published "Nancy Rourke: Deaf Artist Series."

In 2019, she has been awarded the Laurent Clerc Award by Gallaudet University's Alumni Association to recognize a deaf person for "his or her outstanding contributions to society."

== Artistic style and themes ==
Rourke’s painting style is characterized by large, energetic fields of bold primary colors (red, blue, yellow), heavy impasto, and figurative-abstraction that communicate themes of resistance, affirmation, and liberation for Deaf people. Her work often depicts hands, mouths, eyes, and other motifs used within De'VIA to symbolically address oralism, audism, and the centrality of sign language in Deaf life. Rourke has described and written about a personal visual vocabulary often labeled Rourkeism and the related concept of Surdism, a term she uses to articulate art that centers the Deaf experience and aims toward social change.

== Exhibitions ==
Rourke has exhibited widely in the United States and internationally, participating in solo and group shows at galleries, academic institutions, and cultural centers. Her work has been shown in venues associated with Deaf studies and contemporary art; she has been featured in exhibitions at RIT/NTID venues and has taken part in international De'VIA-related shows.

== Publications ==
In 2014, she published Deaf Artist Series: Nancy Rourke. The book was distributed through presses and Deaf-culture outlets; the book presents her paintings alongside biographical and interpretive material and has been used as an educational resource in Deaf education and art programs.

== Awards and recognition ==
In recognition of her artistic and community work, Rourke has received multiple honors. In 2019, she was awarded the Laurent Clerc Award by Gallaudet University's Alumni Association to recognize a deaf person for "his or her outstanding contributions to society."

She was named a 2024 Disability Futures Fellow, part of a cohort supported by the Ford Foundation and Mellon Foundation and has been recognized by organizations that platform Deaf and disability-focused artists. Rourke is also listed among United States Artists supported artists and has received fellowships and awards acknowledging her role as an artist-advocate.
