= Mississippi School for the Blind =

Coordinates: 32.341397°N 90.155798°W

- 1252 Eastover Drive, Jackson, MS 39211; United States

Information
- Established: 2 March 1848; 177 years ago
- School board: Mississippi State Board of Education
- Principal: Mrs. Robin Acord
- Grades: K–12
- Gender: Coed
- Website: msb.msdbk12.org

Mississippi School for the Blind (MSB) is a state-operated K-12 public school for blind children located in Jackson, Mississippi, United States.

The Mississippi State Legislature established the Institution for the Instruction of the Blind on March 2, 1848, through Article 9, Chapter 43. The legislature appropriated $2,500 to the operation of the institution.

It has dormitories housing students from outside of the Jackson metropolitan area.
