= John B. Davis =

Economist (Marquette University; Universiteit van Amsterdam; Tinbergen Instituut)

John Bryan Davis is an American economist and philosopher. He is professor emeritus of economics at the University of Amsterdam and Marquette University. He has previously held positions at Università di Torino, Université de Paris I Panthéon-Sorbonne, Erasmus University, Cambridge University, and Duke University, among others. He is a former president of the Association for Social Economics and the History of Economics Society, former vice-president of the European Society for the History of Economic Thought, and former Chair of the International Network for Economic Method. He has also served as co-editor of the Journal of Economic Methodology and editor of the Review of Social Economy.

Davis is primarily known for his historical and philosophical work on economics. In The Theory of the Individual in Economics (2003), Individuals and Identity in Economics (2011), and more recently Identity, Capabilities, and Changing Economics (2024), he discusses the philosophical and methodological issues concerning individual agency and identity in economics. Other topics discussed in Davis's work include the philosophical development of John Maynard Keynes, stratification economics, economic pluralism, and complexity economics.

== Selected Publications ==
Books

- Keynes's Philosophical Development. Cambridge University Press, 1994.
- The Theory of the Individual in Economics: Identity and Value. Routledge, 2003.
- Economic Methodology: Understanding Economics as a Science. Palgrave Macmillan, 2010 (with Marcel Boumans; second edition, 2016).
- Individuals and Identity in Economics. Cambridge University Press, 2011.
- Identity, Capabilities, and Changing Economics: Reflexive, Adaptive, Socially Embedded Individuals. Cambridge University Press, 2024.

Articles

- "The Turn in Economics: Neoclassical Dominance to Mainstream Pluralism?" Journal of Institutional Economics, 2 (1), 1-20, 2006.
- "The Turn in Recent Economics and Return of Orthodoxy" Cambridge Journal of Economics, 32 (3), 349–366, 2008.
- "Identity and Individual Economic Agents: A Narrative Approach" Review of Social Economy, 67, 71–94, 2010.
