= Described and Captioned Media Program =

- Founded: 1950
- Purpose: Deaf education, Blind education, promote equal accessibility, captioning, audio description
- Location: Spartanburg, South Carolina, United States of America
- Region served: United States of America
- Website: dcmp.org

The Described and Captioned Media Program (DCMP), originally known as Captioned Films for the Deaf, Inc. in 1950, and later known as Captioned Films and Videos and the Captioned Media Program, is a national nonprofit funded by the United States Department of Education under federal Public Law 85-905. It is currently administered by the National Association of the Deaf.

The DCMP houses a national library of accessible educational media (e.g., DVDs, CD-ROMs, and streaming video) that is available to teachers and parents/guardians of K-12 students who are deaf, hard of hearing, blind, visually impaired, or deaf-blind. It also maintains a search gateway that allows users to selectively search across the DCMP clearinghouse of accessibility-related articles on deafness, blindness, accessibility, captioning, and description, including collaborator websites.

== History ==
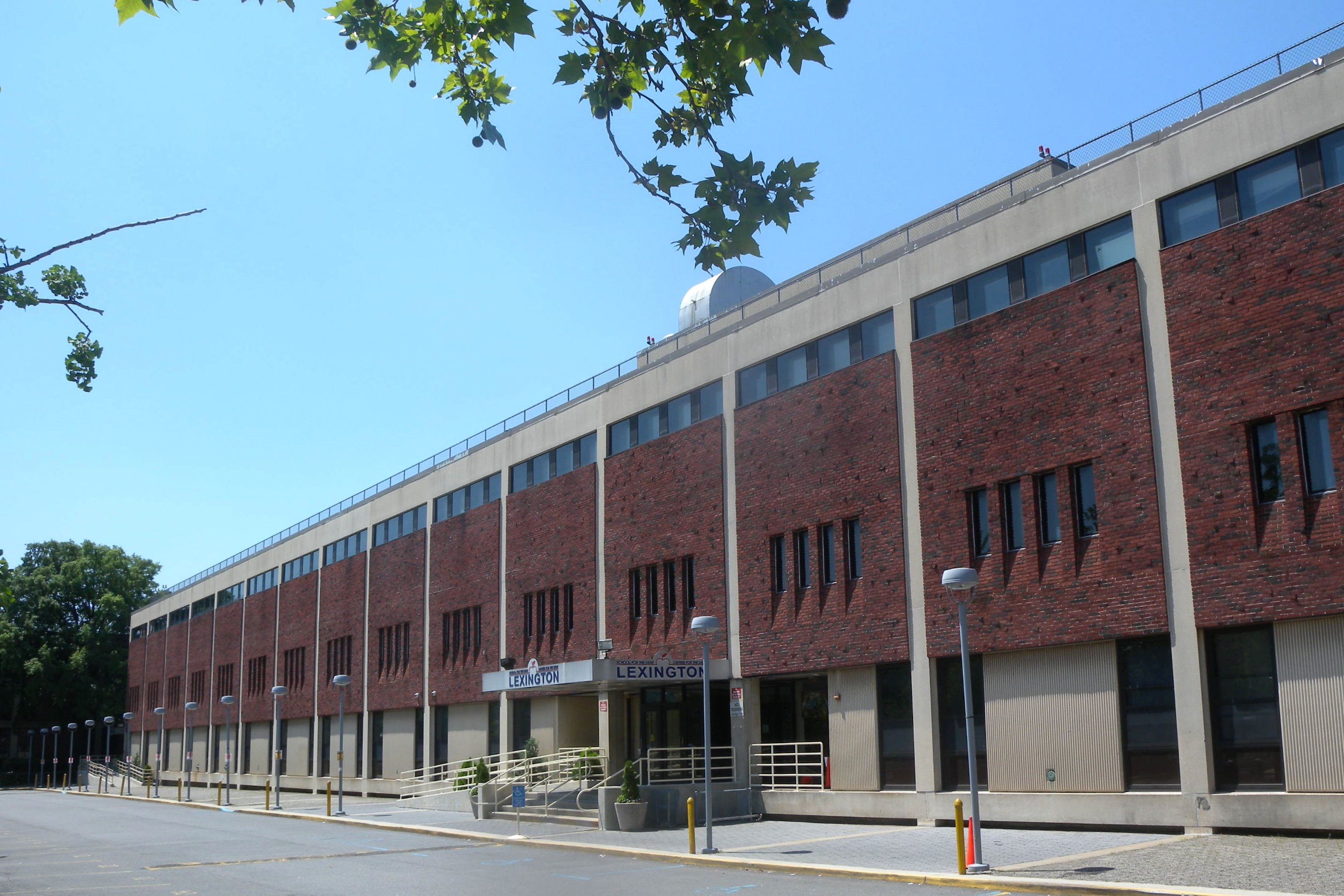
Lexington School for the Deaf

Captioned Films for the Deaf, Inc. was established in 1950 in Hartford, Connecticut. Founders Edmund Boatner, superintendent of the American School for the Deaf, and Dr. Clarence O’Connor, superintendent of the Lexington School for the Deaf, organized the program as a private nonprofit corporation. In a few years, a library of thirty captioned theatrical films was acquired.

Although the program was initially a success, more financial support was needed than could be provided by private funds. The possibility of government support was explored at length. Organizations, including the National Association of the Deaf, the National Fraternal Society of the Deaf, the Conference of Executives of American Schools for the Deaf, and the Alexander Graham Bell Association for the Deaf, lobbied Congress on behalf of the program.

In 1958 the Captioned Films for the Deaf, Inc. became federal Public Law 85-905. The private corporation dissolved, and its entire collection of films was donated to the government. In July 1959 the requisite funding was made available, and in October of that year the new federally run Captioned Films for the Deaf (CFD) program opened its doors to the public.

Although the initial purpose of the CFD was to provide subtitled Hollywood films to deaf people, Congress soon amended the original law to authorize the acquisition, captioning, and distribution of educational films.

In 1984 CFD introduced videocassettes and subsequently became Captioned Films/Videos (CFV). Throughout the late 1980s and early 1990s, 16mm films were withdrawn from the collection in favor of the more widely used VHS format. Likewise, in the mid-to-late 1990s, DVD, interactive CD-ROM, and streaming media gradually took over as the formats of choice in many schools and homes across the country. To reflect this evolution, CFV was again rebranded as the Captioned Media Program (CMP). This change occurred simultaneously with an increased focus on accessible media for K-12 students and their teachers and parents. In 2006 the CMP began serving students with vision loss, and once again changed its name to the Described and Captioned Media Program.

Along the way, the program established quality standards for captioned media, particularly that which is used in educational settings. The Captioning Key: Guidelines and Preferred Techniques (now known as the Captioning Key for Educational Media) is a manual designed to encourage high-quality captioning standards. Given its wide circulation and constant evolution, the Captioning Key remains an important component of the DCMP’s services today.

DCMP service to students who are blind or visually impaired involves another essential accessibility tool: audio description. In October 2008 the DCMP also released its Description Key for Educational Media. Developed in partnership with the American Foundation for the Blind, the Description Key is a first-of-its-kind reference for description vendors. The DCMP also evaluates American captioning and description vendors according to these guidelines.
