= Ann Silver =

British physiologist (1929–2023)

- Born: 23 November 1929; British India
- Died: 10 March 2023 (aged 93)
- Education: University of Edinburgh
- Known for: Cholinesterases research

Acetylcholine

Ann Silver (23 November 1929 – 10 March 2023) was a British physiologist, known for her pioneering work on the neurotransmitter acetylcholine. She wrote a seminal text on the Biology of cholinesterases in 1974 and helped to lay the foundations of the cholinergic hypothesis by mapping cholinergic systems and helping to emphasise the importance of these pathways in brain areas central to cognitive and memory functions, leading to the use of cholinesterase inhibitors in the treatment of Alzheimer's disease.

== Background ==
Ann Silver was born at a British hospital in India where her father was serving in the Indian army. Although a baptismal certificate states that she was "said to be born" on 23 November 1929, no actual birth certificate was issued. Her father was born in Grenada, then part of the British West Indies, where his Scottish father was a Church of Scotland minister. The family returned to Britain in 1930 and settled in Suffolk. She has an older brother, Ian A. Silver, who studied zoology at Cambridge, where he then lectured on veterinary anatomy. He is now an emeritus professor of Comparative Pathology at Bristol University.

Silver died on 10 March 2023, at the age of 93.

== Education ==
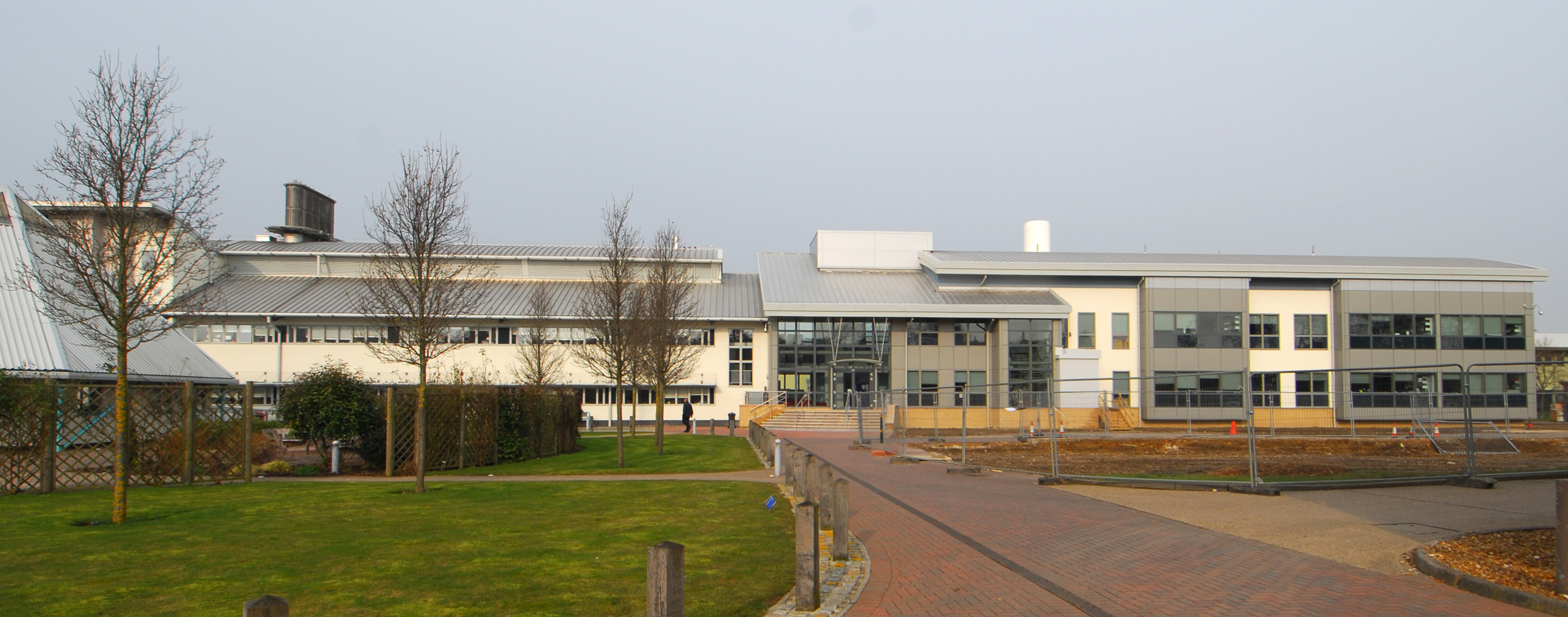
Babraham Institute buildings

Silver was educated at the University of Edinburgh, where she studied zoology, physiology and pharmacology graduating with a BSc (Hons) in 1954. In 1961 she was awarded a PhD in physiology, concerning the transport of choline acetyltransferase in nerves. Her PhD was undertaken as an external student since she was based in Cambridge at that time, carrying out research work for the Agricultural Research Council Institute of Animal Physiology at Babraham (later Babraham Institute).

== Career ==
Catherine Hebb, who had first stimulated Silver's interest in cholinesterases while teaching at the University of Edinburgh, invited Silver to join her when she moved to The Agricultural Research Council Institute of Animal Physiology at Babraham. Silver's initial research was on organophosphorous compounds and their anti-cholinesterase effects. The institute was to remain Ann's employer for most of her career, where she continued to work with Catherine Hebb, co-authoring several papers on their research on the acetylcholine system. While there, Silver worked on the acetylcholine system, mapping the enzymes, choline acetyltransferase (ChAT) and acetylcholinesterase (AchE) and investigating the nerve transport mechanism. She worked with many other eminent scientists at Babraham, a number of whom had also come from or studied at the University of Edinburgh. These included the director Sir John Gaddum, pharmacologist and neurochemist, Marthe Vogt, who had previously lectured in pharmacology and neuro-physiologist Krešimir Krnjević, who had also gained a PhD at the university. After many years in the lab, Silver eventually moved into the role of Information Officer, when a rise in anti-vivisection activity prompted a need for better public relations and awareness. Previous experience of working with the Physiological Society on what would or would not be licensed, made her a suitable candidate for this role. Silver then became ethical editor on the Journal of Physiology, where several of her own research articles were published, ensuring that experiments in any published papers had been conducted humanely.
