= Kansas State School for the Blind =

- School emblem

Location
- Kansas City, Kansas; United States; 39.116530°N 94.639500°W

Information
- Type: Public
- Established: 1867/1868
- Superintendent: Jon Harding
- Grades: K-12
- Campus size: 10 acres
- Campus type: Urban
- Colors: Red, yellow, blue
- Mascot: Eagle
- Website: Kansas State School for the Blind

Kansas State School for the Blind (KSSB) is a fully accredited public high school located in Kansas City, Kansas, U.S., serving students in grades Pre-K through 12. The school was established in 1867. It is located on 10 acres (40,000 m^{2}) located in downtown Kansas City, Kansas. It opened in May, 1868 and admitted the first five students.

== History ==
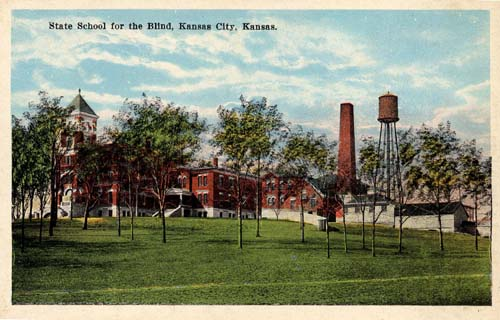
Kansas State School for the Blind, circa 1882

The land the KSSB sits on was donated to the city of Wyandotte upon the death of a Native American man, William Johnson. When the town was platted in 1856, the 10 acres (40,000 m^{2}) of land was designated for a park. In 1863, the city leased the land to the state of Kansas provided it would be used as a "blind asylum".

In 1867, the legislature set aside $10,000 for the construction of the first building which was completed in October of that year. In March 1868, another $10,500 was set aside until a total of 10 children (aged 10–21) were enrolled. Local newspapers advertised the school under the name "Asylum for the Blind" and 11 students had applied by April 23, 1868. The exact date of the school's opening date is unknown, but it most likely opened in May 1868. Other historical accounts cite the school opening in October 1867 (when the first building was completed) or September 1868.

Governor Samuel J. Crawford appointed a Board of Trustees for the asylum and hired W. H. Sawyer as the superintendent. The Board of Trustees controlled the school until 1876 when the Board of Trustees of State Charitable Institutions took over. In 1877, the name of the school was changed to the "Kansas Institution for the Education of the Blind". Despite this name, the school was not recognized as a true educational institution, rather it was operated as a charitable organization. Between 1905 and 1913, the school was run by the Board of Trustees of State Charities and Corrections.

In 1913, the school was renamed the Kansas School for the Blind and was recognized as an educational institution. It was moved to the control of the Board of Administration alongside state colleges. In 1939, the School for the Blind and the School for the Deaf were placed under the Board of Regents. In 1969, the school's name was changed to the "Kansas State School for the Visually Handicapped" to be more inclusive as many of the students were not fully blind. In the 1971–72 school year, the school was placed under the Kansas State Board of Education, which currently administers the school.

In the 1991–92 school year, the school's name changed to its current title, Kansas State School for the Blind.

== Campus ==
Its dormitory is the Edlund Residence Hall.
