= Alice Lougee Hagemeyer =

Deaf American librarian

- Born: 1934 (age 91–92); Scottsbluff, Nebraska
- Occupation: Librarian

Alice Lougee Hagemeyer (born 1934) is a deaf American librarian who worked to make libraries more accessible for deaf people.

== Career ==
Hagemeyer graduated from Gallaudet University in 1957. From 1957 to 1991, she worked for the District of Columbia Public Library. In 1974, she created Deaf Awareness Week, later called Deaf Heritage Week, in which programs about deaf culture are held in libraries. She became the District of Columbia Public Library's first full-time "Librarian for the Deaf Community" in 1976. Also in 1976, she earned a master's degree in Library Science from the University of Maryland. Simultaneously, she joined the American Library Association’s (ALA) office for Diversity, Literacy, and Outreach Services in 1976 to lead the Bridging Deaf Cultures interest group, which have been improving libraries’ service for deaf people over the past 50 years. In 1979, she began The Red Notebook, which was a binder of information by and about deaf people for the Martin Luther King Memorial Library. In 2001, the information went online, on a website called "The Red Notebook." In 1980, she founded the unit now known as the Library Service to People who are Deaf or Hard of Hearing Forum, which is a unit within the American Library Association. In 1986, she co-founded Friends of Libraries for Deaf Action, which became an official section of the National Association of the Deaf in 1992. She was also the chair of the National Association of the Deaf Ad Hoc Committee on National Deaf History Month, and started the initiative to get March 13 to April 15 recognized as National Deaf History Month in the United States. In 2006, the American Library Association and the National Association of the Deaf declared that they would recognize that time as National Deaf History Month.

She received the National Association for the Deaf's President's Award in 1980, was recognized as one of the University of Maryland's College of Information Studies' Distinguished Alumni in 1987, and was granted Honorary Membership in the American Library Association in 2007. Also in 2007, she was also named Deaf Person of the Month for August by DeafPeople.com.

She is the author of Deaf Awareness Handbook for Public Librarians, and The Public Library Talks To You (a handbook for deaf people who use public libraries.) In 1992, in her article "We Have Come a Long Way", published in Library Trends, she describes characteristics of deaf people and ways libraries can develop policies and services that provide accessibility to the deaf community.
