= Carol Padden =

American sign language researcher

- Born: 1955 (age 70–71); Washington, D.C.
- Spouse: Tom Humphries
- Awards: MacArthur Fellow
- Scientific career
- Fields: Communications
- Institutions: University of California, San Diego

Carol A. Padden (born 1955 in Washington, D.C.) is an American academic, author, and lecturer. She is a professor in the Department of Communication at the University of California, San Diego, where she has been teaching since 1983.

== Background ==
She was born deaf to a Deaf family, and also has a Deaf older brother. Both of her parents were faculty members at Gallaudet University.

"My parents are both deaf, and I have an older deaf brother, so sign language was a natural part of my upbringing. When I was eight, I transferred from a special school for deaf children to my local public school and for the first time, I was among children and adults who did not sign. I often describe this experience as being educated abroad, because it gave me a sense of self and difference that I did not have before".

She was raised bilingually in English and American Sign Language. As a child, she was immersed in Deaf culture: the people with whom she and her family socialized attended both Deaf schools and Deaf clubs.

Padden is married to Tom Humphries, who is also Deaf and has co-authored several books with her. They have a daughter, who is not deaf.

== Education ==
Padden received a Bachelor's of Science degree in linguistics at Georgetown University in 1978. She received a PhD in linguistics at UC-San Diego in 1983 under the supervision of David Perlmutter. Padden's PhD dissertation on American Sign Language morphology and syntax was published in the Garland Press Outstanding Dissertations (Linguistics Series, 1988).

== Views on Deaf Culture ==
Deaf in America: Voices from A Culture was a pioneer in Deaf Studies. This book's goal was to "write about people in a new and different way." Padden and Humphries did not want to focus on writing about their hearing loss, but to focus on their language and their culture. Much has been written since this book, and Deaf Studies has really flourished. In 1988, however, this was a relatively new concept.

Neal Conan: Let's start with the big question: What is deaf culture? How does the condition of deafness lead to the creation of a culture? Carol, why don't you go first. Ms. Padden: Yes, I'll start with that. The concept of culture is a way to capture something that deaf people share – not only deaf people, but groups of deaf people that are all over the world. It describes what deaf people have in common, their common history, their sets of ideas, their common practices. Culture itself captures a sense of commonality within a group of people. American Sign Language is a critical part of that commonality.

Carol Padden has experienced Deaf Culture first-hand since birth. However, in the Deaf Community, this is not always the case. Many Deaf people from hearing families do not have exposure to Deaf culture until they become adults. In fact, Carol Padden's spouse Tom Humphries became deaf at the age of six, but did not meet other Deaf people until he entered college. Together, they have participated in a new generation of research on sign language.

== Honors and awards ==
She was named a 1992 Guggenheim Fellow.

In 2010, the John D. and Catherine T. MacArthur Foundation named Carol Padden a recipient of its so-called "genius" grant. The foundation recognized Padden's pioneering work in the morphology and evolution of American Sign Language with a no-strings attached grant of $500,000.

She was elected a fellow of the Linguistics Society of America in 2011.

== Selected works ==
Padden's published writings encompass 43 works in 78 publications in 7 languages and 5,474 library holdings. Several of her publications were created with her husband and co-author, Tom Humphries.

- Open Your Eyes: Deaf Studies Talking
- A Basic Course in American Sign Language (TJ Publishers, 1980) ISBN 978-0-932666-43-7
- Deaf in America: Voices from a Culture. Harvard University Press. 1988. ISBN 978-0-674-19424-3.
- Learning American Sign Language (Allyn & Bacon, 1991, 2nd ed. 2003) ISBN 978-0-13-528571-8
- Inside Deaf Culture. Harvard University Press. 2005. ISBN 978-0-674-01506-7.
