= National Black Deaf Advocates =

U.S. non-profit organization

- Abbreviation: NBDA
- Type: Nonprofit organization
- Tax ID no.: 38-3119153
- Legal status: 501(c)(3)
- Purpose: To promote the leadership development, economic and educational opportunities, and social equality, and to safeguard the general health and welfare of Black deaf and hard of hearing people.
- Headquarters: Austin, Texas, U.S.
- Coordinates: 30.217048°N 97.7458165°W
- Region served: United States
- Members: 600
- President: Isidore Niyongabo
- Vice President, Chair: Kimberly Lucas
- Interim Secretary: Kamili Belton
- Treasurer: Ibukun Odunlami
- Revenue: $168,721 (2020)
- Expenses: $14,723 (2020)
- Employees: 0 (2020)
- Volunteers: 14 (2020)
- Website: www.nbda.org

The National Black Deaf Advocates (NBDA) is an advocacy organization for Black deaf and hard of hearing people in the United States.

== Organization ==
NBDA serves as the national advocate for deaf and hard of hearing African-Americans. Membership includes not only African-American adults who are deaf and hard of hearing but also deaf and hard-of-hearing people of all races, parents of children who are deaf or hard of hearing; professionals who work with the deaf and hard of hearing youth and adults; sign language interpreters; and affiliated individuals and organizations.

The executive board serves on a voluntary basis and consists mainly of deaf and hard-of-hearing individuals. Its officers (president, vice-president, treasurer, and secretary) are elected during the national conventions and elected board representatives represent each region (Eastern, Southern, Southwestern, Midwestern, and Western). The NBDA has several programs and scholarships:

=== Scholarships ===
The NBDA provides educational scholarships to undergraduate and graduate black deaf students.

=== Workshops ===
The NBDA has established two programs for youth and young adults: the Collegiate Black Deaf Student Leadership Institute and the Youth Empowerment Summit.

=== Pageant ===
The Miss Black Deaf America beauty pageant is a competition for young Black Deaf women. Since its inception in 1983, during the second National Black Deaf Advocates Conference in Philadelphia, the pageant has crowned more than 20 Miss Black Deaf America winners. Miss Black Deaf America winners receive college scholarships towards supporting their educational goals.

=== News ===
The NBDA Connections is the official publication of NBDA exclusively for NBDA members. It is published in every season.

== History ==
At the 100th anniversary of the National Association of the Deaf in July 1980, a Black deaf caucus was held. Led by Charles "Chuck" V. Williams of Ohio, Sandi LaRue and Linwood Smith of Washington, DC, they presented issues of the NAD's lack of attentiveness to the concerns of Black Deaf Americans as well as the lack of representation of Black Deaf individuals as convention delegates. Sandi LaRue issued a statement to the convention attendees: "NAD must take action to communicate better with the Black deaf community, encourage the involvement of minorities" within the national and state organizations, and recruit more Black Deaf children in the Junior NAD and youth leadership camp. The July 6, 1980 The Cincinnati Enquirer published an article on the needs of Black Deaf people at the NAD convention in which LaRue stated to the newspaper, "We would like to get on the cover and front pages."

A local Black Deaf committee in DC began the work on planning a mini-conference by, for, and about the Black Deaf experience. The first Black Deaf Conference, "Black Deaf Experience," was held on June 25–26, 1981, at Howard University in the city.

Charles "Chuck" V. Williams proposed hosting a national conference in Ohio the following year. On August 13–15, 1982, in Cleveland, Black Deaf people from all over the United States met again to address cultural and racial issues impacting the Black Deaf community. The conference theme "Black Deaf Strength through Awareness" drew more than 300 conference attendees. A debate was held as to whether a national organization should be formed. The idea was accepted.

A new organization, National Black Deaf Advocates, was officially formed. The six founding members were Lottie Crook, Ernest Hairston, Willard Shorter, Linwood Smith, Charles "Chuck" V. Williams, and Elizabeth "Ann" Wilson. In 1983 Sheryl Emery was elected as the founding president of NBDA and established the organization's by-laws and developed the administrative guidelines. Celeste Owens served as vice president.

== Past presidents ==
- Albert Couthen, Executive Secretary, 1982–1983
- Sheryl D. Emery, Executive Director, 1983–1987
- Celeste Owens-Samuels, Acting Executive Director, 1987–1988
- Lottie Crook, President, 1988–1990
- Carl Moore, President, 1990–1993
- Pamela Lloyd-Ogoke, President, 1993–1995 and 1995–1997
- Albert Couthen, President, 1997–2000
- Gwendolyn Powell, President, 2000–2001
- Steven Younger, Acting President, 2001–2002
- Dr. Reginald Redding, President, 2002–2005
- Thomas Samuels, President, 2005–2007
- Fred M. Beam, President, 2007–2009
- Ernest E. Garrett III, President, 2009–2011
- Benro Ogunyipe, President, 2011–2013
- Patrick Robinson, President, 2013–2015
- Tim Albert, President, 2015–2017
- Evon Black, President, 2017–2019
- Isidore Niyongabo, President, 2019-Current

== Past national conferences ==
Year	Location	Conference Theme
1981	Washington, DC	The Black Experience (Not NBDA Conference)
1982	Cleveland, OH	Black Deaf Strength Through Awareness (First National Conference)
1983	Philadelphia, PA	Our Place In The Society
1984	New York, NY	Destroying The Myths, Discovering The Truths
1985	Washington, DC	Glancing Back, Shape The Present, And Looking Ahead
1986	Chicago, IL	If Not Us, Then Who? If Not Now, Then When?
1987	Cleveland, OH	The Black Family: Togetherness
1988	Detroit, MI	Deaf, Gifted and Black
1989	Atlanta, GA	Returning To Basics, Defining Our Organization
1990	Oakland, CA	Motivation And Perseverance Make Dreams Come True
1991	Memphis, TN	The 90’s, What Challenges For Deaf And Hearing Impaired Americans
1993	St. Thomas, Virgin Islands	Vision of Unity: Bridging The Gap Through Broad Based Experiences
1994	St. Paul, MN	Tools For A Healthier, Wiser Black Community
1995	Nashville, TN	Thoughts And Dreams Challenge Our Black Deaf Americans
1996	Los Angeles, CA	Taking Charge: Empowerment, Leadership, and Motivation
1997	Washington, DC	Black Deaf Leadership In the 21st Century: Preparing the Way
1998	Indianapolis, IN	The Black Deaf Community: Building Collaborative Partnerships
1999	Montego Bay, Jamaica	Combing our Efforts: Education, Employment, and Youth Empowerment
2000	Houston, TX	Determining, Acquiring And Realizing Our Challenge In The New Millennium
2002	Detroit, MI	Claiming the Abundance – Black Deaf Culture: Education, Technology, Finance, and Employment
2003	Denver, CO	Soaring Higher: Meeting the Challenges, Realizing the Opportunities
2004	Philadelphia, PA	Our Place In Society: Looking Back, Moving Forward
2005	Orlando, FL	Building on Dr. Andrew Foster’s Legacy: Volunteerism and Self-Help
2007	St. Louis, MO	Today’s Vision Is Tomorrow’s Reality: Celebrating 25 Years of Progress
2009	Scottsdale, AZ	Moving To A Higher Level: Change Starts From Within
2011	Charlotte, NC	Overcoming Today’s Changing World: Changes We Need to Reinforce a Better Tomorrow
2013	New Orleans, LA	Aiming for Greater Excellence!
2015	Louisville, KY	Partners in Progress: Creating the Vision Together
2017	Baltimore, MD	Ignite & Explore Beyond All Limits
2019	Oakland, CA	Building Together: A Community of Strength, Knowledge and Power
2021	Birmingham, AL	TBA

== Past regional conferences ==
Year	Region	Location	Conference Theme
2006	Eastern	New York City, NY	Together We Unite, Together We Commit, and Together We Achieve: Inspiration, Motivation, & Preparation are our Key to Community Success
2006	Midwestern	Chicago (Alsip), IL	Black and Deaf: Together, We Stand Strong
2006	Southern	Atlanta, GA	Southern Renaissance
2006	Southwestern	Houston, TX	UJIMA: Strengthening Our Deaf Community Through Collective Work and Responsibility
2008	Eastern	Washington, D.C.	Rising to a Higher Level
2008	Midwestern	Louisville, KY	No Struggle, No Progress
2008	Southern	Charlotte, NC	You Make A Difference: Changing and Expanding Yourself
2008	Southwestern	Little Rock, AR	Empowering Our Black Deaf Community
2010	Eastern	Philadelphia, PA	It’s Our Move: A Challenge for Change
2010	Midwestern	Detroit, MI	Passing the Torch: A New Generation of Leadership
2010	Southern	Birmingham, AL	Together Everyone Achieves More Enriching the Black Deaf Community through Training, Education, Employment, Advocacy & Mentoring
2010	Southwestern	New Orleans, LA	Cultivating the Mind, Energizing the Spirit, and Progressing the People within the African American Deaf Community
2012	Eastern	South Plainfield, NJ	The Future is in Our Hands
2012	Midwestern	Cleveland (Middleburg Heights), OH	Bridging the Generational Gap
2012	Southern	Atlanta (East Point), GA	Reconnect, Refocus, Recharge
2012	Southwestern	Dallas, TX	Let’s Get Our Shine On
2014	Eastern	New York City, NY	Refocus: The Past Lights Our Future Path
2014	Midwestern	Indianapolis, IN	Through Empowerment, We Can Succeed & Gain Equality
2014	Southern	Memphis, TN	Celebrating the Past, Living the Present, Preparing for the Future
2014	Southwestern	Houston, TX	Iparabo: Come Together As One
2016	Eastern	Washington, DC	Make Us Matter
2016	Midwestern	Columbus, OH	State of the Black Health: Living Well in the 21st Century
2016	Southern	Jacksonville, FL	Moving Onward & Upward: Positive - Progress
2016	Southwestern	Little Rock, AR	Together We Can Rise to A Higher Level
2018	Eastern	Philadelphia, PA	TBA
2018	Midwestern	Indianapolis, IN	It Starts With Us
2018	Southern	Raleigh, NC	What Matters to You
2018	Southwestern	New Orleans, LA	Discovering the Treasure of Black Deaf Leadership
2020	Eastern	TBA	TBA
2020	Midwestern	St. Louis, MO	Expecting the Best for the Black Deaf Community in 2020
2020	Southern	TBA	TBA
2020	Southwestern	Dallas, TX	20/20 Vision - The View From Here: Black and Deaf in America
