= Henry Winter Syle =

American episcopal priest

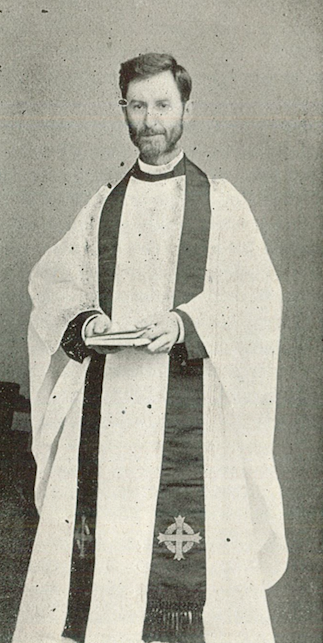
- Born: November 9, 1846; Shanghai, China
- Died: January 6, 1890; Philadelphia, Pennsylvania
- Venerated in: Anglican Communion
- Feast: August 27

Henry Winter Syle (November 9, 1846 – January 6, 1890) was the first deaf person to be ordained a priest in the Episcopal Church in the United States.

Henry Winter Syle was born in Shanghai, China; Syle was a student and parishioner of Thomas Gallaudet. He was deaf from an early age. He attended Trinity College in Hartford, Connecticut, St. John's College in Cambridge, England, and Yale University in New Haven, Connecticut. Syle was encouraged to become a priest by Gallaudet. Ordained on October 14, 1883, he became the first deaf clergyman in the United States. He established a congregation for the deaf in 1888.

Syle struggled with poor health his whole life. He died of pneumonia on Jan. 6, 1890, in Philadelphia, Pennsylvania.

He is commemorated along with his teacher, Thomas Gallaudet on August 27 on the Episcopal calendar of saints.

He died on January 6, 1890, and was interred at West Laurel Hill Cemetery in Bala Cynwyd, Pennsylvania.
