= Tom L. Humphries =

American academic

- Citizenship: United States
- Occupation: Professor

Tom L. Humphries is an American academic, author, and lecturer on Deaf culture and deaf communication. Humphries is a professor at the University of California, San Diego (UCSD).

== Early life ==
Humphries coined the term audism in an unpublished paper in 1975 and repeated the term in his doctoral PDE (Project Demonstrating Excellence) in 1977. He earned his Ph.D. in Cross Cultural Communication and Language Learning at Union Institute & University in 1977.

== Career ==
Humphries is an associate professor in the Department of Communication at the San Diego branch of the University of California.

In addition to teaching at UCSD, he has been developing an experimental curriculum for teaching deaf children by applying bilingual teaching practices.

One way of framing his major area of interest is summarized in the abstract of his 2010 Lyons Lecture at the Rochester School for the Deaf:

The processes of deaf identity construction are not unique phenomena but echo the experience of other embedded cultural groups, particularly those that are stressed by the assertion of hegemony over them by others. Theorists Jose Marti and W.E.B. Du Bois, who struggled with similar issues, offer us ways to think about the complicated discourses of Deaf culture and the local social histories in which Deaf culture is constructed.

== Selected works ==
Humphries' published writings encompass 43 works in 78 publications in 7 languages and 5,474 library holdings. His works are created with his wife and co-author, Carol Padden.

- A Basic Course in American Sign Language (1980)
- Deaf in America: Voices from a Culture (1988)
- Inside deaf culture (2004)
- Learning American Sign Language (1992)

Chapters

- Humphries, T. (1996). "On deaf-mutes, the strange, and the modern Deaf self" in Culturally Affirming Psychotherapy with Deaf Persons. N. Glickman and M. Harvey, eds., Hillsdale, NJ: Lawrence Erlbaum Associates, 1996.
- ____________. (2001). "On Deaf-mutes, the Strange, and the Modern Deaf Self," in Culturally Affirming Psychotherapy with Deaf Persons, N. Glickman and M. Harvey, eds., Hillsdale, NJ: Lawrence Erlbaum Associates, 1996. Reprinted in Deaf World: A Historical Reader and Primary Sourcebook, Lois Bragg, Ed. New York: New York University Press.
- ____________. (2004). "The modern Deaf self: Indigenous practices and educational imperatives," in Literacy and Deaf People: Cultural and Contextual Perspectives. B. Brueggemann, ed.. Gallaudet University Press.
- ____________. (2008). "Scientific explanation and other performance acts in the re-organization of DEAF," in Signs and Voices, Lindgren, DeLuca & Napoli, eds. Gallaudet University Press.
- ____________. (2008). "Scientific explanation and other performance acts in the re-organization of DEAF," in Signs and Voices, Donna Jo Napoli, ed.. Gallaudet University Press.
- ____________. (2008). "Talking culture and culture talking" in Open Your Eyes, Dirksen Bauman, ed., University of Minnesota Press.

Journals

- Humphries, T. and B. Allen. "Re-organizing teacher preparation in Deaf Education" in Sign Language Studies. 8:2. 2008.
- ____________. and MacDougall, F. "Chaining and other links: making connections between American Sign Language and English in two types of school settings" in Visual Anthropology Review, 15:2, Fall/Winter 1999/2000.
