= National Association of the Deaf (United States) =

U.S. nonprofit organization

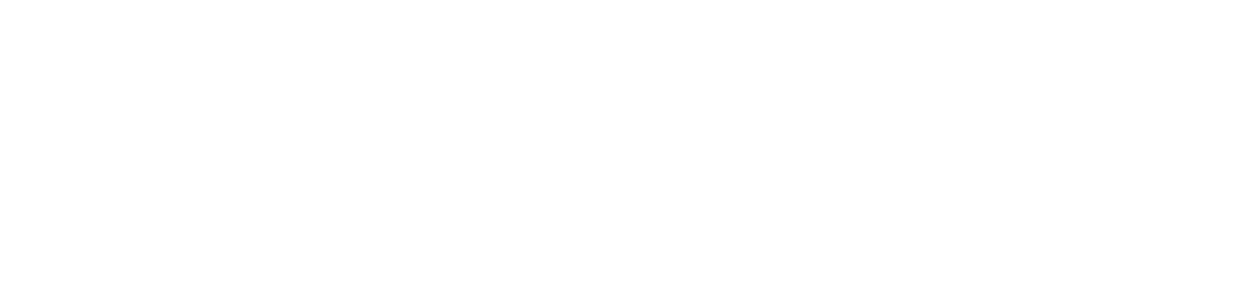
- Founded: August 25, 1880; 146 years ago
- Type: Nonprofit organization
- Tax ID no.: 94-1358295
- Legal status: 501(c)(3)
- Purpose: To preserve, protect, and promote the civil, human, and linguistic rights of deaf and hard of hearing people in the United States of America.
- Location: Silver Spring, Maryland, United States
- Coordinates: 38.9978611°N 77.0310896°W
- Region served: United States
- President: Stephanie Hakulin
- CEO: Bobbie Beth Scoggins (interim)
- Revenue: $4,485,930 (2023)
- Expenses: $4,933,975 (2023)
- Endowment: $290,573 _{(2021)}
- Employees: 28 (2024)
- Volunteers: 25 (2023)
- Website: nad.org
- Formerly called: National Association of Deaf Mutes

The National Association of the Deaf (NAD) is an organization for the promotion of the rights of deaf people in the United States. NAD was founded in Cincinnati, Ohio, in 1880 as a non-profit organization run by Deaf people to advocate for deaf rights, its first president being Robert P. McGregor of Ohio. It includes associations from all 50 states and Washington, DC, and is the US member of the World Federation of the Deaf, which has over 120 national associations of Deaf people as members. It has its headquarters in Silver Spring, Maryland.

All of its presidents were late-deafened until 1980; Gertrude "Gertie" Galloway was the first President who was born Deaf (and she was also the first female President). NAD previously hosted the Miss Deaf America Ambassador Program (MDAAP) as well as the Youth Ambassador programs, both of which have been discontinued. The association holds biennial conventions. It has advocated for deaf rights in all aspects of life, from public transportation to education.

== Mission statement ==
The mission of the National Association of the Deaf is "to preserve, protect and promote the civil, human and linguistic rights of deaf and hard of hearing people in the United States of America."

While it works for Deaf people, it also works to promote knowledge about the rights, culture, and language of Deaf people to hearing people.

== Activities ==
The NAD advocates for any issues that are associated with deaf rights. Early on, it worked to preserve sign language, especially under George Veditz. During his time as president, Veditz and other members of the NAD used the new film technology to capture individuals signing so that their language would never be lost.

Although African-Americans were not permitted to be members until later, starting in the early 20th century, the NAD advocated for vocational training for the "Colored Deaf" population. Because of the lack of rights afforded to blacks in NAD, several groups were formed, included National Black Deaf Advocates.

The NAD has also fought to keep deaf teachers teaching deaf students and for the opening of deaf residential schools across the country.

In 1909, President William Howard Taft signed a law allowing deaf individuals to take civil service exams only after the NAD fought to have this as a law.

NAD was a strong advocate for having captioned films and, in 1958, President Dwight Eisenhower signed a law requiring films to be captioned.

The NAD supported the students and faculty of Gallaudet University in the Deaf President Now protests of 1988.

The Americans with Disabilities Act (ADA) of 1990 was also fought for by the NAD. Most recently, the NAD has advocated for professional sports stadiums to provide captioning for the referees calls and for announcers' comments. The association has worked to require insurance companies to have deaf people as clients and for landlords to have deaf tenants. Hotels are now required to provide "deaf-friendly" alarm clocks and smoke detectors because of the NAD's persistence in the matter.

The NAD fights for the right of deaf individuals to be able to use American Sign Language and to be provided an interpreter. The NAD website gives information on the rights of deaf individuals have and how to go about gaining them.

The biennial NAD conference includes awarding of various awards.

=== Complaints against massive open online courses ===
The NAD has filed several successful complaints to force the removal of massive open online courses without mandated closed captioning.

In 2014, NAD filed a complaint with the United States Department of Justice Civil Rights Division alleging that thousands of lectures and other course content that had been made freely available via YouTube and iTunes by the University of California, Berkeley violated the Americans with Disabilities Act of 1990 because numerous lectures in the university's Massive open online course program featured automatically generated captions, which contained inaccuracies. In 2016, the Department of Justice concluded that the content would violate the ADA unless it was updated to conform to the current Web Content Accessibility Guidelines. In response, a university spokesperson stated that the costs of "captioning alone would exceed a million dollars" and that the university would comply with the DOJ order by removing all of the content from public access.

Following the success of this lawsuit, NAD sued Harvard and MIT. In 2019, Harvard paid $1.5 million to the NAD. In 2020, MIT paid $1 million to NAD. In total, the lawsuits earned over $2.5 million for NAD and successfully removed over 20,000 MOOC lectures.

== Milestones ==
- 1896: The first woman (Julia Foley) was elected to the board of the NAD.
- 1960: The Junior NAD was established.
- 1964: Women members of the NAD were first allowed to vote.
- 1965: Black members were first accepted into the NAD.
- 1972: The first Miss Deaf America Pageant (called the Miss Deaf America Talent Pageant until 1976) was held during the NAD Convention in Miami Beach, Florida; the winner was Ann Billington.
- 1980: Gertrude Galloway became the first female president of the NAD.

== State associations ==
State associations are affiliated with but independent of the NAD. All 50 states and Washington, DC, have state associations, many of which provide a dual membership with the NAD. Some state associations receive their bylaws from the NAD.

== See also ==
- Americans with Disabilities Act of 1990
- Rehabilitation Act of 1973#Section 504
- Disability subsection on Accessibility
- Deaf culture
- Deaf history
- Timeline of disability rights in the United States
- Timeline of disability rights outside the United States
- Laurent Clerc Awards

== Other sources ==
- Gallaudet University Archives, Timeline: Gallaudet University and the Deaf Community
- Dunn, Lindsay Moeletsi. Edited by Mervin D. Garretson. "Education, Culture and Community: The Black Deaf Experience." A Deaf American Monograph 45 (1995): 37–41.
