= Amy (1981 film) =

1981 American family drama film by Vincent McEveety

- Theatrical release poster
- Directed by: Vincent McEveety
- Written by: Noreen Stone
- Produced by: Jerome Courtland
- Starring: Jenny Agutter; Barry Newman; Kathleen Nolan; Chris Robinson; Lou Fant; Margaret O'Brien; Nanette Fabray
- Cinematography: Leonard J. South
- Edited by: Gregg McLaughlin
- Music by: Robert F. Brunner
- Production company: Walt Disney Productions
- Distributed by: Buena Vista Distribution
- Release date: March 20, 1981
- Running time: 100 minutes
- Country: United States
- Language: English
- Box office: $2.5 million

Amy is a 1981 American drama film directed by Vincent McEveety and starring Jenny Agutter. It was produced by Walt Disney Productions, distributed by Buena Vista Distribution, and written by Noreen Stone.

== Plot ==
In 1913, Amy Medford leaves her possessive, abusive husband to begin a new life teaching speech to deaf students in the rural Appalachian Mountains at a school for blind and deaf children. Though encountering resistance from those who question whether it's even possible to teach speech to children with hearing impairments, Amy becomes close to the staff and children, building a new life for herself and gaining the personal strength she will need to stand up to the domineering, violent husband who is not content to let her live her own life.

== Cast ==
- Jenny Agutter as Amy Medford
- Barry Newman as Dr. Ben Corcoran
- Kathleen Nolan as Helen Gibbs
- Chris Robinson as Elliot Medford
- Lou Fant as Lyle Ferguson
- Margaret O'Brien as Hazel Johnson
- Nanette Fabray as Malvina
- Lance LeGault as Edgar Wanbuck
- Lucille Benson as Rose Metcalf
- Jonathan Daly as Clyde Pruett
- Lonny Chapman as Virgil Goodloe
- Brian Frishman as Mervin Grimes
- Jane Daly as Molly Tribble
- Dawn Jeffory as Caroline Chapman
- Peggy McCay as Mrs. Grimes
- Len Wayland as Mr. Grimes
- Virginia Vincent as Edna Hancock
- Norman Burton as Caruthers
- Otto Rechenberg as Henry Watkins
- Ronnie Scribner as Walter Ray
- Seamon Glass as Mr. Watkins

== Production ==
Amy was originally filmed as a television movie titled Amy on the Lips, and was the first television movie that Disney Studios made for an adult audience.

Nanette Fabray and Louise Fletcher were interested in the role of "Malvina", a teacher of deaf children. Fabray, who played the part, was hearing impaired, and Fletcher's parents were deaf.

The deaf children in the film, except for Brian Frishman, were students from the California School for the Deaf in Riverside, California. Dawn Jeffory, who was cast as Caroline Chapman, had a real-life role as a guest instructor at the school, and was helpful to director Vincent McEveety in working with the children. Lyle Ferguson, the school superintendent, was played by Lou Fant, a son of deaf parents, who helped establish the National Theatre for the Deaf.

By January 1981, the film's title was changed to Amy and given a theatrical release as Walt Disney Productions felt that the film was "so powerful" it warranted a theatrical release.

== Music ==
The film's score was written by Robert F. Brunner. The film features one original song, "So Many Ways", written by Bruce Belland (lyrics) and Robert F. Brunner (music). The song was sung by Julie Budd and plays during the film's opening credits and is reprised during the film's end credits.

== Educational film ==
In 1982, Disney Educational Services excerpted a sequence from the film for educational use, entitled Amy-on-the-Lips.

== Home media ==
Amy was originally released as a double bill on a re-release of Alice in Wonderland. The film came to video cassette in October 1981. Disney released a manufactured-on-demand DVD of the film as part of their "Disney Generations Collection" line of DVDs on June 28, 2011.

== See also ==
- List of films featuring the deaf and hard of hearing
