= Rose and Melvin Smith =

Married American artists

Rose J. Smith and Melvin R. Smith
- Education: University of Minnesota, Twin Cities (BA)
- Occupation: Artists
- Years active: 1968–present
- Known for: Rondo series

Rose and Melvin Smith are two American artists, married to one another, whose multimedia artworks primarily address Black life in the United States, specifically in the context of the Rondo neighborhood of Saint Paul, Minnesota. Their works have been exhibited in and collected by galleries and museums in New York City, Chicago, Oklahoma, and the Twin Cities.

== Early life ==
Rose J. Smith, born Rose JoAnn Beecham, spent most of her life living in Rondo. She and her parents, along with five brothers and four sisters, had moved there from Missouri in 1950 so that her father could locate work. Growing up, she earned awards for her art at Marshall Junior High School and Mechanic Arts High School.

Melvin R. Smith, on the other hand, spent much of his life in Oklahoma City, Oklahoma. In high school, he was the first Black student at his high school to win the Scholastic Art Award Gold Key. He then joined the United States Marine Corps, after which he moved to the Twin Cities for college.

The two met as students at the University of Minnesota, Twin Cities and quickly married in 1968 after a blind date; Rose J. Smith was a studio art student who made paintings, while Melvin R. Smith studied journalism and worked at the Minnesota Daily.

Both Smiths lived in Rondo at the time. The historic neighborhood had been "the center of black life in St. Paul" in the early twentieth century and "stood out as one of the country's only stories of integration without violence"; it was also where many Black artists worked, most notably Gordon Parks, while additionally serving as a hotspot for the civil rights movement and bringing together Black community vis-à-vis social clubs and Black churches. However, the neighborhood was eventually demolished, from 1958–1968, due to construction plans for the Interstate 94 highway. The Smiths, following their marriage, moved out of Rondo following the highway's completion, as did hundreds of other families.

== Career ==
Rose J. Smith is a painter, while Melvin R. Smith is a sculptor and collage artist. After leaving Rondo in 1968, they decided to "follow the journey of a lost tribe of African Americans in art" by hosting exhibitions all throughout Minnesota, as well as traveling to New York City, Chicago, and Atlanta, among other crucial sites of Black artistry. Along the way, they held various jobs, such as leading a modeling agency, running a flower shop, and shooting professional photography. After the September 11 attacks, however, the Smiths returned to Saint Paul and establish themselves as "Minnesota artists." "We've had art shows in New York. Chicago. But yet nobody in Minnesota knew who we were," Melvin R. Smith told KARE 11.

Since their marriage, the Smiths have shown work in the South Side Community Art Center, the Studio Museum in Harlem, Chicago State University, and many other places, and many of their pieces have since been collected by institutions like the Weisman Art Museum, the Fred Jones Jr. Museum of Art, the Oklahoma State Collection, the Minnesota Historical Society, the Roxane and Steve Gudeman Collection, and the Travelers Insurance Collection.

In the nineties, the Smiths began the Rondo series, "a sprawling body of work that stands as an elegiac anthem for that lost neighborhood and the enduring community that lives on in its wake" according to the Weisman Art Museum in Minneapolis. Largely inspired by the sensibilities of jazz, their artworks in the series range from portraits to three-dimensional models while making use of "photographs, archival materials, and their own experiences."

Also since the nineties, Melvin R. Smith's 40-foot-tall sculpture, The Spirit of Rondo, has stood in the Western Sculpture Park on Marion Street in Saint Paul. According to Melvin R. Smith, it represents numerous Black leaders and historical figures but was especially influenced by James Thompson, a freedman who came to Minnesota after emancipation and became the first Black person to settle on the grounds now known as Saint Paul. The Smiths stated that they had plans to someday move The Spirit of Rondo to Summit-University, Saint Paul so that it could be viewed by drivers on Interstate 94.

In 1997, the Smiths opened the Oklahoma Museum of African-American Art, which they ran for six years. Later, in 2019, Melvin R. Smith received a McKnight Fellowship. In addition to making art, Melvin R. Smith has also coached tennis for over four decades, having taught Saint Paul mayor Melvin Carter at a young age. In 2023, the Smiths were the featured artists of the Unity Church-Unitarian of Saint Paul. Their work was exhibited in the church's Parish Hall.

== Personal life ==
The Smiths are based in Eagan, Minnesota, in a house which Melvin R. Smith had built himself. Inside it, both Smiths have their own separate studios. Often asked if they've ever collaborated on a piece together, Melvin R. Smith stated, with laughter, "Oh my god, no."

== Exhibitions ==
- Rose and Melvin Smith: Remembering Rondo, Weisman Art Museum, June 7–September 8, 2019
- Journey Of A Lost Tribe, Fort Gansevoort, October 13, 2022 – January 10, 2023 (Online)
- Recollections of Rondo, Fort Gansevoort, November 17, 2023 – January 20, 2024
