= Washington Hall (New York City) =

Coordinates: 40°42′52″N 74°0′21″W

Washington Hall (1809–1844) was a red brick building designed by John McComb Jr. located at the southeast corner of Broadway and Reade Street. It was built from 1809 to 1812 on the site of the African Burial Ground in what is now the Civic Center of Lower Manhattan in New York City. During its history, it served as a hotel, banquet hall, and restaurant at various times.

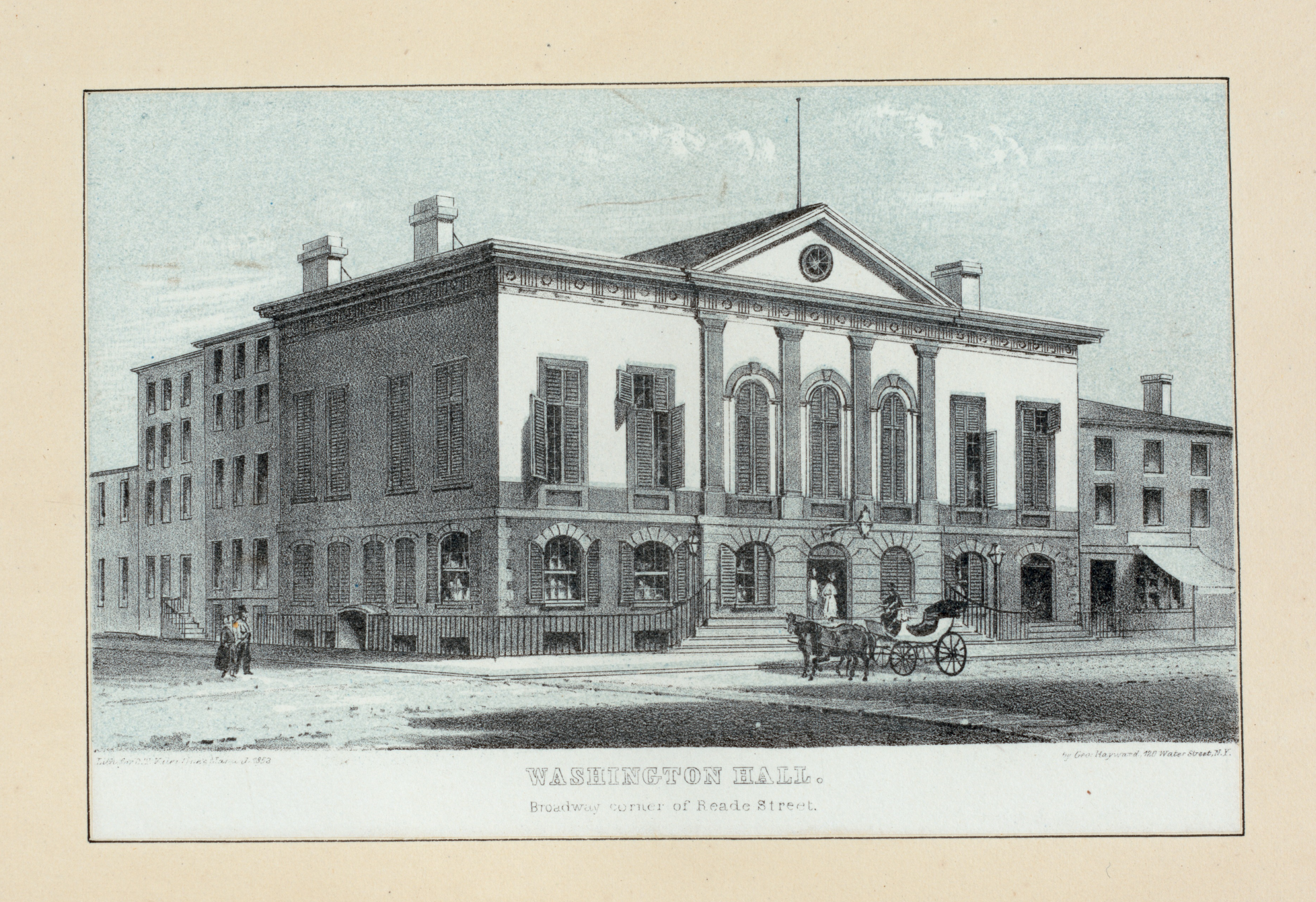
Washington Hall 1809-1844

It was originally owned by Dutch-American merchant John Gerard Coster. It served as an early meeting place and headquarters for the Washington Benevolent Society, a semi-secret association that was an electoral arm of the Federalist Party. On September 20, 1824, it was the site of a banquet for the Marquis de Lafayette as part of his 1824-1825 tour of the United States. In May 1826, Samuel Akerly gave an address here concerning the education of the students at the New York Institution for the Deaf and Dumb, which also served as a fundraiser for the school.

In 1835, it was the location of the first meeting of the Saint Nicholas Society, which was founded by Washington Irving.

Washington Hall became less prominent during the mid-19th century, as the oyster bar in its basement became more important than the hotel itself. The hotel burned down in July 1844 and Coster, the owner died the following month, at which point his heirs sold the property to A.T. Stewart. Stewart, in turn, would replace the ruins of Washington Hall with the original section of the A.T. Stewart Dry Goods Store, a building which still stands to this day.
