= Lou Fant =

American Sign Language teacher

- Born: Louie Judson Fant Jr. December 13, 1931; Greenville, SC
- Died: June 11, 2001 (aged 69); Seattle, WA
- Occupations: Teacher, author, coach
- Known for: Sign language education and consulting
- Notable work: Ameslan: An Introduction to American Sign Language, The American Sign Language Phrase Book

Lou Fant (December 13, 1931 – June 11, 2001) was a pioneering teacher, author and expert on American Sign Language (ASL). He was also an actor in film, television, and the stage. Natively bilingual in ASL and English, he often played roles relating to sign language and the deaf.

His life centered on advocacy and teaching for the deaf.

== Personal life and education ==
Fant was born December 13, 1931, in Greenville, South Carolina. He was the only child of deaf parents Louie Judson Fant and Hazeline Helen Reid. Though hearing, he learned ASL as a native language from his parents. They moved to Dallas in 1944 where he graduated from Baylor University, and later received his M.A. in Special Education from Columbia University.

At Baylor, he met and married Lauralea Irwin. They moved to New York, and later to Washington D.C. where he taught at Gallaudet College. They had four children and remained married until her death in 1988. Fant later married Barbara Bernstein, and was married to her until his death in Seattle of pulmonary fibrosis.

== Career ==
He began his career teaching at the New York School for the Deaf, then at Gallaudet University in Washington, D.C.

In 1967, Fant helped establish the National Theater of the Deaf in Waterford, Connecticut and the Registry of Interpreters for the Deaf.

Fant was also a sign language poet, using creative alterations in space and time of ordinary signs to create a type of sign language performance art.

Fant led the Seattle Central Community College Interpreter Training Program from 1989 to 2000, until his retirement.

=== Hollywood career ===
In the 1970s Fant relocated to Southern California to pursue his acting career. Fant took part in numerous television productions, including General Hospital and Little House on the Prairie, and in film, such as Looking for Mr. Goodbar. He was also sign-language coach for some well-known actors, including Henry Winkler, Diane Keaton, Robert Young and Melissa Gilbert. He coached actors in the use of sign language for Children of a Lesser God. He also appeared in television commercials. While in Southern California, he also co-hosted a talk show, "Off Hand," with Herb Larson, a deaf instructor at California State University Northridge, where Fant also taught ASL classes. GREEN

== Publications ==
Fant published nine books, and contributed to eight films promoting use of sign language. His Ameslan: An Introduction to American Sign Language (1972) was the first book designed to teach ASL as a unique language rather than as a mere lexicon of signs.

== Filmography ==
Year	Title	Role	Notes
1972	Pete 'n' Tillie	Party Guest	Uncredited
1974	Airport 1975	Needlepoint Woman's Husband - Passenger	Uncredited
1976	The Pom Pom Girls	Principal	
1977	Looking for Mr. Goodbar	Teacher	
1977	The Bionic Woman	Convict	S2:E15 "Deadly Ringer: Part 1"
1980	Resurrection	Harvey	
1980	Little House on the Prairie	Nathan Page	S6:E17 "Silent Promises"
1981	Amy	Lyle Ferguson	
1985	Tuff Turf	Mr. Croyden	
