= Harvey Prindle Peet =

American educator

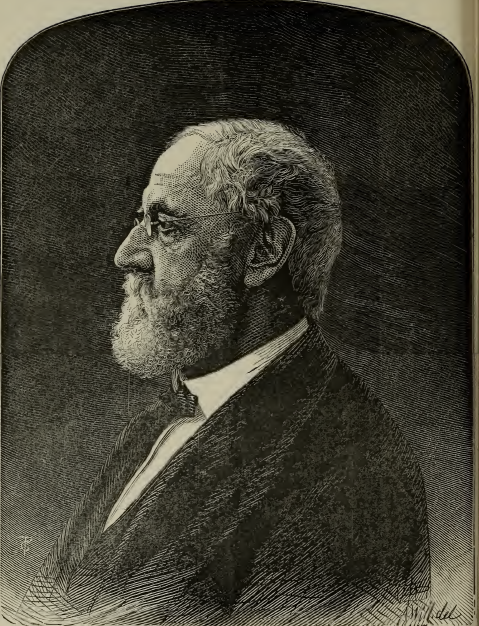
- Born: November 19, 1794; Bethlehem
- Died: January 1, 1873; New York City
- Resting place: Spring Grove Cemetery
- Education: Phillips Academy, Yale University, Gallaudet University
- Occupation: Teacher
- Employers: American School for the Deaf; New York School for the Deaf

Harvey Prindle Peet (November 19, 1794 – January 1, 1873) was an American educator.

== Biography ==
Harvey Prindle Peet was born in Bethlehem, Connecticut, on November 19, 1794, the son of Richard and Joanna (Prindle) Peet. He began to teach a district school at the age of 16, and persevered until he had earned money enough for a two years' course at Phillips Academy, Andover. He graduated from Yale College in 1822.

On leaving college his intention was to devote his life to the Christian ministry, but an invitation to teach in the American Asylum for the Deaf and Dumb, at Hartford, Connecticut, gave him the opportunity to discover and develop his rare fitness for what was then a new profession. His life was thenceforwards devoted to the cause of deaf-mute education. For nearly nine years he continued in Hartford, and was then appointed Principal of the N. Y. Institution for the Instruction of the Deaf and Dumb, in New York City. Entering on this office in February 1831, he fulfilled its duties for more than thirty-six years, for fourteen of them being President of the board of directors. The degree of LL.D. was conferred on him in 1849 by the Regents of the University of the State of New York, and that of PhD. by the National Deaf-mute College in 1871. Under his care the N Y. Institution rose to be much the largest of its kind in the world, and one of the most successful. He published a series of elementary text-books for the use of deaf-mutes, and wrote numerous papers on deaf-mute education and kindred topics.

In 1867, Dr. Peet retired from the active labors of his position, retaining the title of emeritus Principal, and serving as one of the Board of Directors until his death. For the last few years of his life he suffered from rheumatic affections, which finally reaching the region of the heart induced congestion of the lungs. He died in New York City within two hours after the opening of the New Year, 1873.

Dr. Peet married three times. His first wife, Margaret Maria Lewis, daughter of Rev. Isaac Lewis, D.D., to whom he was married November 27, 1823, died September 23, 1832, leaving three sons, who became able and accomplished teachers of the deaf and dumb. The two younger, Edward and Dudley (the latter a graduate of Yale in 1852), died in 1862; and the eldest (Yale, 1845) succeeded to his father's office. Dr. Peet married, in 1835, Miss Sarah Ann Smith, a daughter of Matson Smith, M.D., who died December 30, 1864. His third wife, Mrs. Louisa P. Hotchkiss, to whom he was married January 15, 1868, survived him. The number of the American Annals of the Deaf and Dumb for April 1873 is a memorial of his life and services.
