= Samuel Akerly =

American physician

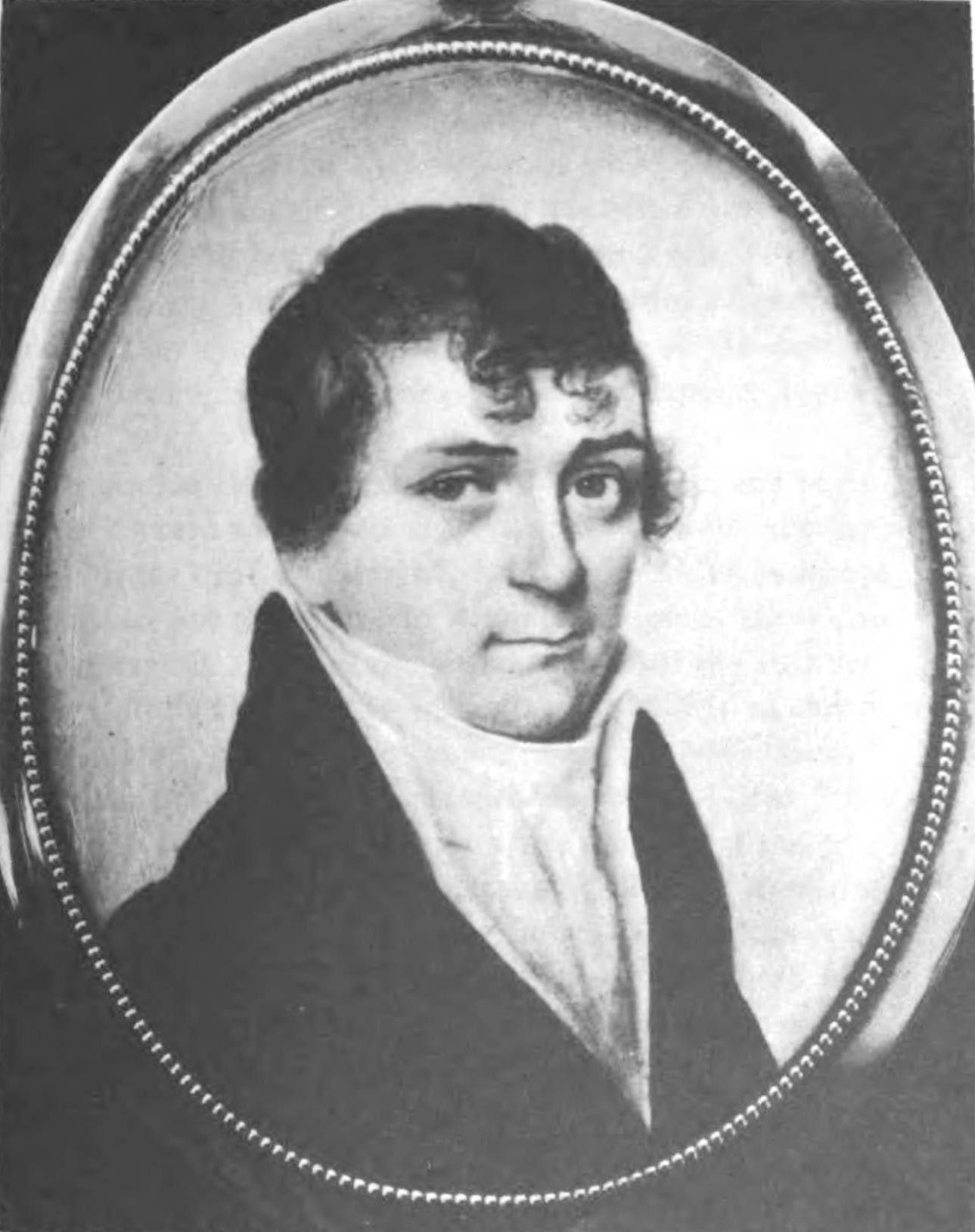
- Born: May 1785
- Died: July 6, 1845; Staten Island
- Education: Columbia College (BA, MA); College of Physicians and Surgeons (MD)
- Occupation: Medical doctor

Samuel Akerly (May 1785 – July 6, 1845) was an American medical doctor, superintendent of the New York Institution for the Deaf from 1821 to 1831, and co-founder and president of the New York Institute for the Education of the Blind from 1831 to 1842.

== Early life ==
The Akerly family came from Lancashire, England, and settled in Long Island by way of Connecticut. Samuel Akerly was born in May 1785 in New York City. He graduated from Columbia College in 1804 and was awarded a Master of Arts in 1807. He studied at the College of Physicians and Surgeons in 1807 and was awarded a Doctor of Medicine degree.

== Career ==
Over his lifetime, Akerly contributed to medical and scientific periodicals, was active in institutions for the education of both deaf and blind people. In 1808, he exchanged letters with Benjamin Rush over the use of mercury as a possible cure for tuberculosis. During the War of 1812, he served as Post Surgeon for the United States Army at Fort Gansevoort. Later in his life, he was active in War of 1812 veterans organizations.

Besides his work on the education of the deaf and blind, he was interested in a variety of scientific disciplines including conchology, entomology, geology, and ichthyology. He served as one of the early vice-presidents of the New York Academy of Sciences.

Akerly was also interested in educational causes more broadly. In 1829, he was on a committee led by Albert Gallatin that promoted common schools in Greece, in the aftermath of the Greek War of Independence.

He also was engaged in New York City politics. In 1817, he was an assistant to the aldermen of the New York City Council, and in that capacity supported a proposal for gas lighting for downtown Manhattan.

=== New York Institution for the Deaf ===
Beginning in 1817, Akerly was affiliated with the New York Institution for the Deaf and from 1821 to 1831, he served as the superintendent, secretary and attending physician of the institution. During this period he corresponded with Mason Fitch Cogswell, co-founder of the American School for the Deaf in Connecticut. In their correspondence, they discuss the prior animosity between the two institutions, stemming from the fact that the earliest teacher of the New York Institution, though he came from Hartford, instead followed the pedagogical philosophy of Joseph Watson. Akerly and Cogswell hoped their differences could be overcome through a new shared pedagogical philosophy. In 1826, he gave an address at Washington Hall concerning the education of its students. Apart from deaf education, Akerly also researched medical cures for deafness, but due to the general state of medicine at the time, had no success.

=== New York Institute for the Education of the Blind ===
Given that he was active in developing instruction for deaf-mutes, he subsequently became interested in education for the blind. In 1831, he co-founded the New York Institute for the Education of the Blind along with Samuel Wood and John Dennison Russ. In 1833, he created an early alphabet for the blind.

== Personal life and death ==
Akerly married Mary Ketchum of Waterford, New York with whom he had 6 children. Akerly was brother-in-law to United States Senator Samuel L. Mitchellwho founded the New York Academy of Sciences.

Akerly lived in what is today known as the Olmstead-Beil House from 1839 until his death on July 6, 1845, in Staten Island.

== Bibliography ==
- Mineralogical description of the country near the Wall-kill and the Shawungunk mountains in New York (1804)
- Conchology of New York and its vicinity (1806)
- Medical topography of the Military Positions in the third United States Military District (1817)
- Essay on the Geology of the Hudson River and the Adjacent Regions (1820)
- Observations and Correspondence on the Nature and Cure of Deafness, and other Diseases of the Ears (1821)
- Address Delivered at Washington Hall (1826)
- Medical Dictionary (1831)
