= Bernard Bragg =

American dramatist

- Born: Bernard Nathan Bragg; September 27, 1928; Brooklyn, New York, U.S.
- Died: October 29, 2018 (aged 90); Los Angeles, California, U.S.
- Occupations: Actor, producer, director, playwright, artist, author
- Known for: Co-founder of the National Theatre of the Deaf

Bernard Bragg (September 27, 1928 – October 29, 2018) was a deaf actor, producer, director, playwright, artist, and author who is notable for being a co-founder of the National Theatre of the Deaf and for his contributions to Deaf performing culture. According to The New York Times, Bragg was "regarded by many as the leading professional deaf actor in the country".

== Early life and education ==
Bernard Bragg was born on September 27, 1928, in Brooklyn, New York, the son of Jennie and Wolf Bragg. He grew up learning American Sign Language (ASL), which was taught to him by his two deaf parents. From a young age, Bragg demonstrated an interest in theatre, which developed as a result of the influence of his father, who was an amateur actor and play manager. Throughout his childhood and adolescence, Bragg attended the New York School for the Deaf, informally known as "Fanwood", and entered Gallaudet College (now University) upon graduating in 1947. Whilst attending Gallaudet, Bragg studied theater under a deaf professor named Frederick Hughes, and starred as the lead role in a number of school plays, for which he won numerous honors. Ultimately, Bragg's theatrical activity culminated in his directing of a play, an adaptation of John Galsworthy's Escape. In addition to theater, Bernard Bragg wrote poetry throughout his time in college, earning the Teegarden Award for Creative Poetry in his senior year.

== Teaching career, mime, and the founding of the National Theatre of the Deaf ==
Shortly after graduating from Gallaudet College in 1952, Bragg was offered a teaching position at the California School for the Deaf, Berkeley, which he accepted. While working as a member of the school faculty, Bragg was given the authority to direct drama productions performed by the students of the institution. In addition, Bragg contributed to shows staged by the National Association of the Deaf and the Los Angeles Club of the Deaf outside of school hours. Four years after becoming a teacher, in 1956, Bragg met the world-famous mime Marcel Marceau after seeing one of his shows in San Francisco. Marceau took a liking to the aspiring actor, and offered to teach him mime in France. Bragg accepted the offer, and travelled to Paris at the end of the 1956 school year. Upon returning to the United States, Bragg began performing mime in various locations throughout the state of California while maintaining his career as a teacher. In addition, Bragg enrolled in San Francisco State University, graduating with a master's degree in special education and a minor in drama in 1959. Two years later, in 1961, a New York University psychologist named Dr. Edna Levine petitioned Bragg about the possibility of creating a professional troupe of exclusively deaf actors. Although funding for the concept could not initially be achieved, the project was saved by David Hays, a Broadway set designer, who overtook management for the idea in 1966. In 1967, Bernard Bragg met with Hays and several other performers and individuals involved in the theatre, and together they founded the National Theatre of the Deaf in Connecticut, prompting Bragg to quit his job as a teacher at the California School for the Deaf, a position which he held for 15 years.

== Debut on NBC ==
Shortly after the founding of the NTD, NBC offered to film Bragg and a set of all deaf actors in a 1-hour program special that would serve as a part of the series NBC Experiment in Television. Premiering on April 2, 1967, the special featured Bernard Bragg, Audree Norton, Ralph White, Howard Palmer, Gil Eastman, June Russi, Phyllis Frelich, and Lou Fant as deaf actors. Gene Lasko, Joe Layton, Arthur Penn, and Nanette Fabray were responsible for the script, musical score/choreography, stage direction, and program introduction, respectively. The special was aired nationwide and made history by being the very first televised instance of deaf actors conversing and performing in sign language rather than mime.

=== Criticism ===
Prior to its airing in April, the idea for the special faced heavy criticism from The Alexander Graham Bell Association for the Deaf and Hard of Hearing, which deemed the program's use of sign language as inappropriate for television.

== Career as a director ==
Bernard Bragg directed numerous plays throughout his lifetime. Tales from a Clubroom, one of his most notable plays, was written in collaboration with Eugene Bergman; it was last performed for a live audience in 2006. In his later years when he moved back to California, Bragg began to teach at California State University Northridge. While working there, he wrote and directed several plays, including To Whom It May Concern; Laugh Properly, Please; and True Deaf. Although most of his productions premiered in the United States, some were adapted for foreign audiences in Germany and China as well. In 2013, Bragg played himself in No Ordinary Hero: The SuperDeafy Movie.

=== Plays ===
- Bragg, Bernard. “Moments Preserved.” National Association of the Deaf, San Francisco, CA, 1966
- Bragg, Bernard and Eugene Bergman. Tales From a Clubroom. Premiered in Cincinnati, OH, 1980.
- Bragg, Bernard. That Makes Two of Us. Premiered at Gallaudet University, Washington D.C., 1982.
- Bragg, Bernard. On the Eve of Golden Wedding Anniversary. Premiered in Berlin, Germany, 1998.
- Bragg, Bernard. To Whom It May Concern. Premiered at California State University, Northridge (CSUN), Northridge, California, 1998.
- Bragg, Bernard. Laugh Properly, Please. Premiered at CSUN, Northridge, California, 1999.
- Bragg, Bernard. To Whom It May Concern [German version]. Premiered in Berlin, Germany, 1999.
- Bragg, Bernard. True Deaf. Premiered at CSUN, Northridge, California, 2000.
- Bragg, Bernard. A Journey Into the World of Visual Wonders. Premiered in Hong Kong, China, 2004.

=== Art and poetry ===
Bernard had an interest in creating art and writing poetry. The following is an example of one of his most well-known poems:

"The Sign Language as I Know it"

Give me back my language the way I signed it when I was young.
Give me back my language the way it used to be– before linguists “discovered” it and conferred a new name on it.
Give me back my language the way I learned from my deaf parents, from their deaf friends, from my teachers, both deaf and hearing.
Give me back my language the way I remember how the deaf storytellers role-modeled it to me.
Give me back my language without any of those rules, restrictions, impositions, or fixed boundaries that the linguists established for it.
Give me back my language that has a great potential for change and growth.
Give me back my language which is very much part of who I am.

== Honors and awards ==
- 1975 La Decoration au Merite Social International — Premiere Classe, World Federation of the Deaf
- 1977 Special Tony Award for Theatrical Excellence to the Actors of the National Theatre of the Deaf (NTD Photo with Sidenote by Michael Schwartz)
- 1986 National Hall of Fame for Persons with Disabilities
- 1988 Doctor of Humane Letters, Gallaudet University
- 1989 The John Bulwer Award, The National Center on Deafness
- 1990 The Bernard Bragg Artistic Achievement Award, Center on Deafness, Chicago
- 1997 Honorary Founder's Award, New York School for the Deaf
- 2001 Special Lifetime Achievement Recognition Award, World Federation of the Deaf, Rome
- 2006 The Bernard Bragg Humanitarian Award, ICODA
- 2007 Recognition Award: NTD Founder, Texas Association of the Deaf
- 2008 Fred C. Schreiber Distinguished Service Award, National Association of the Deaf
