= Mannix =

American detective television series (1967–1975)

- Genre: Action; Detective fiction
- Created by: Richard Levinson; William Link
- Developed by: Bruce Geller
- Starring: Mike Connors; Joseph Campanella (season 1); Gail Fisher (seasons 2–8)
- Theme music composer: Lalo Schifrin
- Composers: Lalo Schifrin; Lyn Murray; Leith Stevens; Joseph Mullendore; Richard Shores; Richard Hazard
- Country of origin: United States
- No. of seasons: 8
- No. of episodes: 195 (list of episodes)

Production
- Camera setup: Single-camera
- Running time: approx. 50 minutes
- Production companies: Desilu Productions (1967–1968) (season 1); Paramount Television (1968–1975) (seasons 1–8)

Original release
- Network: CBS
- Release: September 16, 1967 – April 13, 1975

Mannix is an American detective television series that originally aired for eight seasons on CBS from September 16, 1967, to April 13, 1975. The show was created by Richard Levinson and William Link, and developed by executive producer Bruce Geller. The title character, Joe Mannix, is a private investigator played by Mike Connors.

== Premise ==
During the first season of the series, Joe Mannix works for a large Los Angeles detective agency called Intertect, which was the planned original title of the show. His superior is Lew Wickersham, played by Joseph Campanella. Intertect uses computers to help solve crimes.

As opposed to the other employees, Mannix belonged to the classic American detective archetype, thus usually ignoring the computers' solutions, disobeying his boss's orders, and setting out to do things his own way. He wears plaid sport coats and has his own office that he keeps sloppy between his assignments. Wickersham has cameras throughout the Intertect offices to monitor employee performance, and provides immediate feedback via intercom. Unlike other Intertect operatives, Mannix attempts to block the camera with a coat rack and questions Wickersham, comparing him to Big Brother.

To improve the show's ratings, Desilu head Lucille Ball and producer Bruce Geller made changes for the show to be more similar to other private-eye shows. Ball thought stories featuring computers were too high-tech and beyond the comprehension of the average viewer of the time, so the focus of the show changed. In the first episode of season two, Mannix explains that he had quit Intertect. From the second season on, Mannix worked on his own, with the assistance of his loyal secretary Peggy Fair, a police officer's widow played by Gail Fisher, one of the first black actresses featured in a regular series role.

Mannix gains a working relationship with the Los Angeles Police Department (LAPD), and often exchanges information with his contacts there. The first of these to have a featured role was Lieutenant George Kramer, portrayed by Larry Linville, who had been Peggy's late husband's LAPD partner. Over the course of the series, Mannix's most frequent LAPD contact is Lieutenant Art Malcolm, played by Ward Wood. Another semiregular guest, although not as frequent, was Robert Reed, whose appearances as Lieutenant Adam Tobias coincided with his tenure on The Brady Bunch, also produced by Paramount Television.

Jack Ging played another Mannix contact, Lieutenant Dan Ives, who made several appearances later in the series. Yet another LAPD contact was Lieutenant Dave Angstrom, played by Frank Campanella (real-life brother of Joseph Campanella). In the 1969 season, he also employs the services of a competitive private investigator, Albie Loos (performed by Joe Mantell), as a sort of investigative gofer. In the 1972 season, Albie returns, played by a different actor (Milton Selzer).

While Mannix was not generally known as a show that explored socially relevant topics, several episodes had topical themes. Season two had episodes featuring compulsive gambling, deaf and blind characters who were instrumental in solving cases in spite of their physical limitations, and episodes that focused on racism against Blacks and Hispanics. Season four had an episode focusing on the effects of CTE on a former boxing champion. Season five had an episode focusing on the effects of alcoholism and an episode about fragging. Season six had an episode focusing on the effects that the Vietnam War had on returning veterans, including the effects of PTSD. Season eight had an episode focusing on a rape-induced pregnancy.

== Episodes ==
| Season | Episodes | Originally released | | Rank | Rating |
| Season | Episodes | First released | Last released | Rank | Rating |
|---|---|---|---|---|---|
| 1 | 24 | September 16, 1967 | March 16, 1968 | 58 | —N/a |
| 2 | 25 | September 28, 1968 | April 12, 1969 | 42 | —N/a |
| 3 | 25 | September 27, 1969 | March 21, 1970 | 30 | 19.9 |
| 4 | 24 | September 19, 1970 | March 13, 1971 | 17 | 21.3 |
| 5 | 24 | September 15, 1971 | March 8, 1972 | 7 | 24.8 |
| 6 | 24 | September 17, 1972 | March 11, 1973 | 42 | —N/a |
| 7 | 24 | September 16, 1973 | March 31, 1974 | 31 | —N/a |
| 8 | 24 | September 22, 1974 | April 13, 1975 | 20 | 21.6 (Note: Tied with Cannon) |

== Character ==
Joseph R. "Joe" Mannix is a regular guy, without pretense, who has a store of proverbs on which to rely in conversation. What demons he has mostly come from having fought in the U.S. Army during the Korean War, where as an Airborne Ranger lieutenant he led a twelve-man team operating behind enemy lines for three months before being captured by the Chinese Communists; he was initially listed as MIA while interned as a prisoner of war in a brutal POW camp, until he escaped. Over the length of the series, a sizable percentage of his old Army comrades turn out to have homicidal impulses against him, as does his fellow running back from his college football days. (Note: The episode that introduced police lieutenant Art Malcolm portrayed him as a Korean War buddy of Mannix's, but that connection was generally ignored thereafter.)

During the series, Mannix is also revealed to have worked as a mercenary in Latin America. Like the actor Mike Connors who played the title role, Mannix is of Armenian descent, and speaks fluent Armenian from time to time during the series, as well as conversational Spanish.

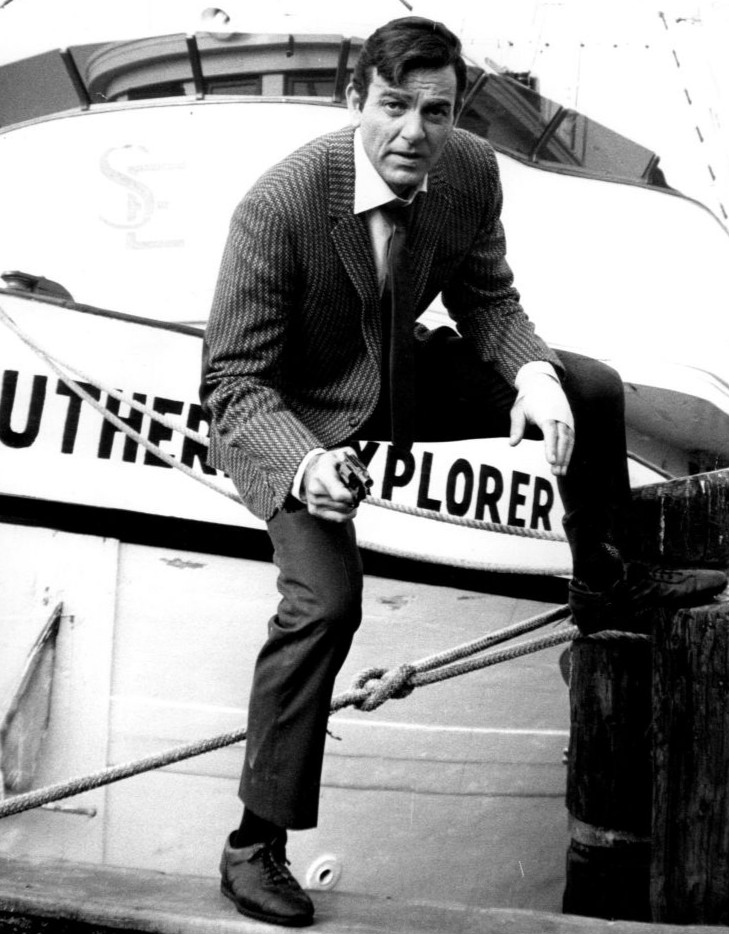
Mike Connors as Joe Mannix, 1968

Mannix is notable for the high level of physical punishment he withstands. During the course of the series, he is shot and wounded over a dozen separate times, and knocked unconscious around 55 times. He frequently takes brutal beatings to the abdomen; some of these went on quite a long time, particularly by the television standards of the era. His vehicle was always a convertible: in season one, Mannix drove a customized Oldsmobile Toronado, replete with a panoramic rear-view mirror; in seasons 2–6, he drove a 1968 Dodge Dart GTS 340 or 1970-73 Plymouth Barracudas. In the final season, he drove a Chevrolet Camaro. Though he can expect to be shot at or run off the road by another car or find his vehicle sabotaged, he keeps his cool and perseveres until his antagonists are brought down.

While making the television pilot "The Name Is Mannix", Connors dislocated his shoulder running away during a From Russia with Love–type helicopter pursuit, and broke his left wrist punching a stuntman who happened to be wearing a steel plate on his back. This character aspect was lampooned multiple times by radio comedians Bob and Ray, with "Blimmix" beginning as being portrayed as dim-witted, and ending with Blimmix being soundly beaten by his adversary. These parodies retained the theme song composed by Lalo Schifrin at the beginning and conclusion.

Starting in season two, Mannix lives and works in West Los Angeles in a mixed-use development called Paseo Verde; his home at 17 Paseo Verde has an attached office from which he runs his agency. The design for the 17 Paseo Verde set is based on a Santa Barbara, California, building that still exists.

Mannix grew up in a town called Summer Grove, where he was a star football and basketball player. Summer Grove had a thriving Armenian immigrant community. As of 1969, Mannix's mother had died 10 years earlier, and Mannix had not been back to the town since the funeral. Mannix's estranged father, Stefan (played by Victor Jory), was still living in Summer Grove, and Mannix and his father started a reconciliation. When Mannix returns to Summer Grove for a case three years later, he and his father are on good terms.

Following military service in the Korean War, Mannix attended Western Pacific University on the GI Bill, graduated in 1955, and obtained his private investigator's license in 1956. He has a black belt in karate. Throughout the series, he appears proficient in a variety of athletic pursuits, including sailing, horseback riding, and skiing. He is an accomplished pool player, plays golf regularly, and is also a skilled airplane pilot. In the first season, he carries a Walther PP semiautomatic pistol. From the second season on, Mannix carries a Colt Detective Special snubnosed revolver in .38 Special caliber.

=== Appearances on other shows ===
In 1971, Connors guest-starred on an episode of Here's Lucy entitled "Lucy and Mannix Are Held Hostage".

In 1997, Connors reprised the role of Mannix in an episode of Diagnosis: Murder titled "Hard-Boiled Murder", which served as a sequel to the 1973 Mannix episode "Little Girl Lost". Several other actors from the old Mannix episode also reprised their roles. In a comic reference to Mannix's famous history of serious injuries and repeated concussions, the show portrayed the main character of Diagnosis: Murder, Dr. Mark Sloan (Dick Van Dyke), as Mannix's longtime physician who advises him to avoid concussions. This draws a sardonic response from Mannix that he'd had "more than his share" of concussions and other injuries during his active career.

Mannix was referred to several times in Mystery Science Theater 3000 episodes when a foot chase or a fight occurred.

While not exactly a show, Mike Connors appears in his Joe Mannix guise as himself in the 2003 comedy film, Nobody Knows Anything. He's depicted as having succumbed to a schizophrenic state of mind where he actually believes he's Mannix while seeing a psychiatrist who finally loses his patience with him and outright tells him "Your name is not Joe Mannix, Mr. Ohanian! It's Krekor Ohanian, you live in Fresno, and you make cheap white wine!"

== Production ==
Gary Morton, Lucille Ball's second husband and head of Desilu Studios, noticed a 1937 Bentley convertible being driven by Mike Connors. A car enthusiast, Morton began talking about cars to Connors, when he remembered a Desilu detective show coming up in which he thought Connors would do well.

Mannix was initially a production of Desilu Productions, which had been purchased by Gulf + Western earlier in 1967. During the first season, Gulf + Western integrated Desilu's operations into its Paramount Pictures subsidiary, and the company became Paramount Television. The series featured a dynamic split-screen opening credits sequence set to theme music from noted composer Lalo Schifrin. Unusual for a private detective series, the Mannix theme is in triple time, the same signature used for waltzes.

The show's title card, opening credits, and closing credits roll are set in variations of the City typeface, a squared-off, split-serif face that was long used by IBM Corporation as part of their corporate design and still appears in their logo. This refers to the computers used by Intertect in the first season. The dot over the "i" in Mannix had the appearance of a computer tape reel. This was removed after the first season.

Over the life of the series, several famous entertainers were featured in one-time roles, including Neil Diamond and Buffalo Springfield as themselves and Lou Rawls as a club singer, Rich Little as an impressionist, and Milton Berle as a stand-up comedian. Essay humorist Art Buchwald also had a cameo role unrelated to journalism, and in another episode, Rona Barrett played herself.

=== Cancellation ===
Mannix finished its eighth season in the top 20 in the Nielsen ratings and plans were made for a ninth season. Mike Connors said that he had been told at a CBS network party the week before the network was to release its 1975 fall schedule that the show was a certain pickup. The reason for the cancellation was that competing network ABC, looking to improve its ratings, began contacting production companies in an attempt to purchase rebroadcast rights for various series. At the time, ABC and Paramount had a fairly successful relationship. ABC approached Paramount with an offer to purchase the rights to rebroadcast older episodes of Mannix as part of their late-night lineup, which they agreed to do.

CBS was unhappy with the move, as Paramount had not informed them of what they were planning to do. The idea of having one of their series airing on a competing network, even if it was only in reruns, turned the tide of opinion against Mannix, as CBS felt viewers would stay away from the newer episodes airing on their network since they could watch the series on a competitor. Thus, when CBS released its schedule a few days later, Mannix was not a part of it. Connors found out about the cancellation through a phone call, with a reporter contacting him asking for comment. Connors said in a later interview, "I felt so lost when it was over."

=== Mannix's automobiles ===
The automobile was a focus of Mannix's professional life, and he had several of them as his personal vehicle in the eight-year run of the series. Those were:

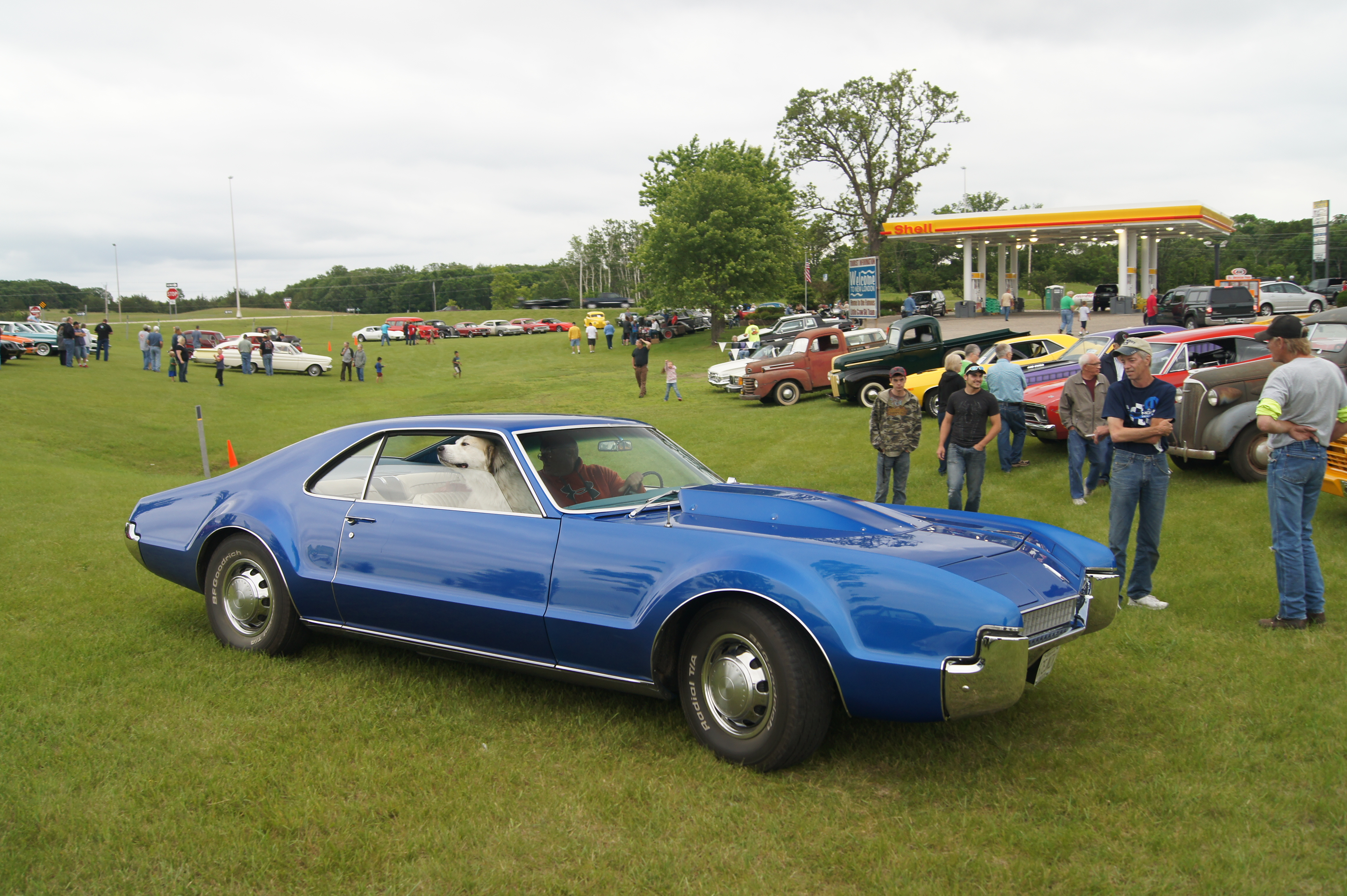
A 1967 Oldsmobile Toronado of the type driven by Mannix in the show's first season

- Season one – 1966 Mercury Comet Caliente convertible (pilot episode: "The Name Is Mannix"), 1967 Mercury Comet Cyclone convertible (one episode only: "Skid Marks on a Dry Run"), 1967 Ford Galaxie 500 four-door hardtop, then a 1967 Ford Fairlane 500 four-door sedan after the Galaxie got shot up – both were Intertect company cars (one episode only: "The Cost of a Vacation"). In all other season-one episodes, Mannix drove a 1967 Oldsmobile Toronado customized into a roadster by George Barris, builder of TV's Batmobile from the 1960s Batman ABC series, since the producers wanted a convertible and Oldsmobile never produced an open-topped Toronado. Due to a change in episode run order ("The Cost of a Vacation" was the second episode of Mannix shot after the pilot, although it was the sixth episode CBS broadcast), the one-shot appearances of the Galaxie and Fairlane were after the Toronado had been established as Mannix's car.
- Season two – 1968 Dodge Dart GTS 340 convertible "kustomized" by George Barris with functional hood scoops, Lucas Flamethrower driving lights, blacked-out grille, racing-style gas filler cap, molded-in rear spoiler, blacked out tail light panel, and custom tail light lenses. The car was originally red, but Executive Producer Bruce Geller wanted it changed to a British Racing Green, which Barris did. (This car still retains its original red paint under the carpet.) A Motorola car-phone (a remarkably expensive and rare item in 1968) was installed. Rader mag wheels like those on the Batmobile were originally installed by Barris, but changed later in the 1968 season to Cragar S/S chrome wheels. Barris also installed his own "Barris Kustoms" emblem on the lower part of each front fender. No duplicate 1968 Mannix Darts were built; it is a "one of one" car. This car was used in both the 1968 and 1969 seasons.

Though a 1969 Dart was built by Barris to replicate this car in the show's 1969 season, the 1968 Dart was regularly seen during the 1969 season. (In the 1969 episode "A Penny for the Peep Show", both the 1968 and 1969 Darts are used in the same shot, to elude a police tail on Mannix, but no explanation in the episode was given for why or how two identically customized green Dart convertibles show up together.)

In further tracing the car's history, the 1968 Dart was reportedly sold to a secretary at Paramount Studios and then was lost for decades until being discovered near a ranger station in the Southern California mountains. It has since been restored to its original Mannix/Barris condition and was featured in Hemmings Muscle Machines, December 2009 issue.

The 1968 Mannix Dart and its intriguing history were also featured on the TV show Drive on Discovery HD Theater in 2010. The TV show reunited the car with Mike Connors for the first time in over 40 years.

The car is currently owned by C. Van Tune, former editor-in-chief of Motor Trend magazine, who conducted the TV interview with Mike Connors and who also wrote an article on the Mannix Dart for the summer 2011 issue of Motor Trend Classic magazine. In that article, the Dart is reunited with Mike Connors, George Barris, and Mannix stuntman Dick Ziker.

Another article on the famous Dart was published in the October 2011 issue of Mopar Action magazine. An article in the New York Times (July 22, 2012) included information on the 1968 Mannix Dart and a recent photo of Mike Connors with the car. The Mannix Dart was also mentioned on Sirius/XM Radio's "60s on 6" channel by disc jockey Mike Kelly.

In October 2016, the car magazine Power & Performance News published an article on the 1968 "Mannix" Dart, written by C. Van Tune.

- Season three – A 1969 Dodge Dart GTS 340 convertible was "kustomized" by George Barris to replicate the 1968 Dart; this car was totalled in a wreck soon after being sold, following its use on the series.
- Season four – 1970 Plymouth Barracuda 340 dark green convertible
- Season five – Three 1971 Plymouth Barracuda convertibles (all dark green with green interiors and black soft tops) were supplied by Chrysler Corporation, and all had differently sized (318, 340, 383) engines. One was wrecked, but later repaired. In one episode, the hood is raised, dynamite is discovered, and the air cleaner reads 383.
- Season six – 1973 Plymouth Barracuda convertible (actually two of the 1971 cars updated with 1973 grilles, headlamps, front fenders, front/rear bumpers, and tail lights)
- Season seven – 1974 Dodge Challenger 360 Coupe: Two were built especially for the show, and had every available option installed, including the rare factory sunroof. Mild Barris customizing included Cragar S/S 15-inch chrome wheels, G60x15 Goodyear radial tires, and an upper body pinstripe.
- Season eight – A Chevrolet Camaro LT, and a red 1975 Chevrolet Impala two-door with a white convertible roof were used.

=== Fair's automobiles ===
Peggy Fair's cars were less prominent, but in seasons two through eight, they included a Simca 1000, Simca 1204 hatchback, Dodge Colt hardtop, and finally a Chevrolet Vega hatchback.

=== Music ===
Lalo Schifrin composed the music for the series. The theme "Mannix", with the B-side "End Game", was released as a single in 1969. Unusual for a hard-boiled detective show, Schifrin wrote the theme song as a jazz waltz, in 6/8 time.

== Guest stars ==
Mannix featured hundreds of guest stars:

- Julie Adams
- Charles Aidman
- Claude Akins
- Lew Alcindor
- Anne Archer
- Barry Atwater
- Val Avery
- Richard Bakalyan
- Hugh Beaumont
- Vincent Beck
- Henry Beckman
- Ed Begley Jr.
- Pamela Bellwood
- Lee Bergere
- Oscar Beregi
- Milton Berle
- Whit Bissell
- Bill Bixby
- Karen Black
- Lloyd Bochner
- Frank Bonner
- Antoinette Bower
- Eric Braeden
- Thordis Brandt
- Geraldine Brooks
- Kathie Browne
- Richard Bull
- Brooke Bundy
- Victor Buono
- Frank Campanella
- Joseph Campanella (Note: After playing Mannix's boss in season one, he returned as a different character, a client, in a season six episode.)
- Anthony Caruso
- Ted Cassidy
- Robert Colbert
- John Colicos
- Robert Conrad
- Yvonne Craig
- John Dehner
- Neil Diamond
- John Doucette
- Don Dubbins
- Howard Duff
- Anthony Eisley
- Dana Elcar
- Robert Ellenstein
- Sam Elliott
- Roy Engel
- Erik Estrada
- Linda Evans
- Shelley Fabares
- Mike Farrell
- Norman Fell
- Pamelyn Ferdin
- Gail Fisher (Note: Prior to playing Mannix's secretary starting in season two, she played a different character, a reporter, in a season one episode.)
- Paul Fix
- Victor French
- Beverly Garland
- Mark Goddard
- Don Gordon
- Harold Gould
- Gloria Grahame
- Kevin Hagen
- Sid Haig
- Mariette Hartley
- Katherine Helmond
- Douglas Henderson
- Howard Hesseman
- John Hillerman
- Kim Hunter
- Diana Hyland
- Jill Ireland
- Robert Ito
- Mako Iwamatsu
- Russell Johnson
- Victor Jory
- Gordon Jump
- Katherine Justice
- Diane Keaton
- Sally Kellerman
- Sandy Kenyon
- Christopher Knight
- Walter Koenig
- Nancy Kovack
- Frank Langella
- Marta Kristen
- Robert Lansing
- Cloris Leachman
- June Lockhart
- Robert Loggia
- Ronald Long
- Perry Lopez
- Barbara Luna
- Dawn Lyn
- Ken Lynch
- Carol Lynley
- Larry Manetti
- Paul Mantee
- Scott Marlowe
- John Marley
- Arlene Martel
- Frank Marth
- Marianne McAndrew
- Darren McGavin
- Katherine MacGregor
- Gerald McRaney
- Burgess Meredith
- Judi Meredith
- Lee Meriwether
- Vera Miles
- Del Monroe
- Priscilla Morrill
- Vic Morrow
- Diana Muldaur
- Richard Mulligan
- Lloyd Nolan
- Sheree North
- Audree Norton
- Mel Novak
- Gerald S. O'Loughlin
- David Opatoshu
- Alan Oppenheimer
- Julie Parrish
- Leslie Parrish
- Michael Pataki
- Felton Perry
- Nehemiah Persoff
- Joanna Pettet
- Barney Phillips
- Paul Picerni
- Slim Pickens
- Phillip Pine
- Eve Plumb
- Ann Prentiss
- Ford Rainey
- Logan Ramsey
- John Randolph
- Lou Rawls
- Stafford Repp
- Barbara Rhoades
- John Ritter
- Pernell Roberts
- Percy Rodriguez
- Marion Ross
- Barbara Rush
- Alfred Ryder
- George Savalas
- Tom Selleck
- William Shatner
- Joan Shawlee
- Martin Sheen
- Tom Skerritt
- Laraine Stephens
- Warren Stevens
- Jan Sterling
- Dean Stockwell
- Jacqueline Susann
- Loretta Swit
- Nita Talbot
- Vic Tayback
- Berlinda Tolbert
- Malachi Throne
- Harry Townes
- Joyce Van Patten
- Elena Verdugo
- John Vernon
- Garry Walberg
- Jessica Walter
- Carol Wayne
- David Wayne
- Fritz Weaver
- Adam West
- William Windom
- Paul Winfield
- H. M. Wynant
- Anthony Zerbe

== Awards and honors ==
For his work on Mannix, Mike Connors was nominated for six Golden Globe Awards, winning once, and for four Emmy Awards. Gail Fisher was nominated for four Emmy Awards, winning once, and for three Golden Globe Awards, winning twice.

The series was twice nominated for the Emmy Award for Best Dramatic Series, and four times for the Golden Globe Award, winning once. In 1972, writer Mann Rubin won an Edgar Award from the Mystery Writers of America for the episode "A Step in Time".

== Royalties lawsuit ==
In May 2011, Connors filed suit in Los Angeles Superior Court against Paramount and CBS Television Studios, claiming that he was never paid royalties from the Mannix series. With the release of the series on DVD, the case was later settled out of court in November of that year.

== Home media ==
=== DVD ===
CBS Home Entertainment (distributed by Paramount) has released all eight seasons of Mannix on DVD in Region 1.

On May 9, 2017, CBS DVD released Mannix- The Complete Series on DVD in Region 1.

In Region 4, Shock has released the first three seasons on DVD in Australia.

| DVD Name | Ep # | Release dates | |
| DVD Name | Ep # | Region 1 | Region 4 |
|---|---|---|---|
| The First Season | 24 | June 3, 2008 | August 10, 2010 |
| The Second Season | 25 | January 6, 2009 | October 12, 2010 |
| The Third Season | 25 | October 27, 2009 | February 9, 2011 |
| The Fourth Season | 24 | January 4, 2011 | N/A |
| The Fifth Season | 24 | July 5, 2011 | N/A |
| The Sixth Season | 24 | January 24, 2012 | N/A |
| The Seventh Season | 24 | July 3, 2012 | N/A |
| The Eighth and Final Season | 24 | December 4, 2012 | N/A |
| The Complete Series | 194 | May 9, 2017 | N/A |

=== Syndication ===
CBS Television Distribution holds the distribution rights for Mannix, but only distributes a package of 130 episodes to local stations. The first and eighth seasons are not part of the package, nor are several episodes from season seven.

The program currently airs on MeTV as part of its late-night lineup and has also aired on its sister network H&I; all 194 episodes of Mannix have aired on both networks.

It has also been broadcast on FETV from 2021 to 2023.
