= Washington Benevolent Societies =

American political societies

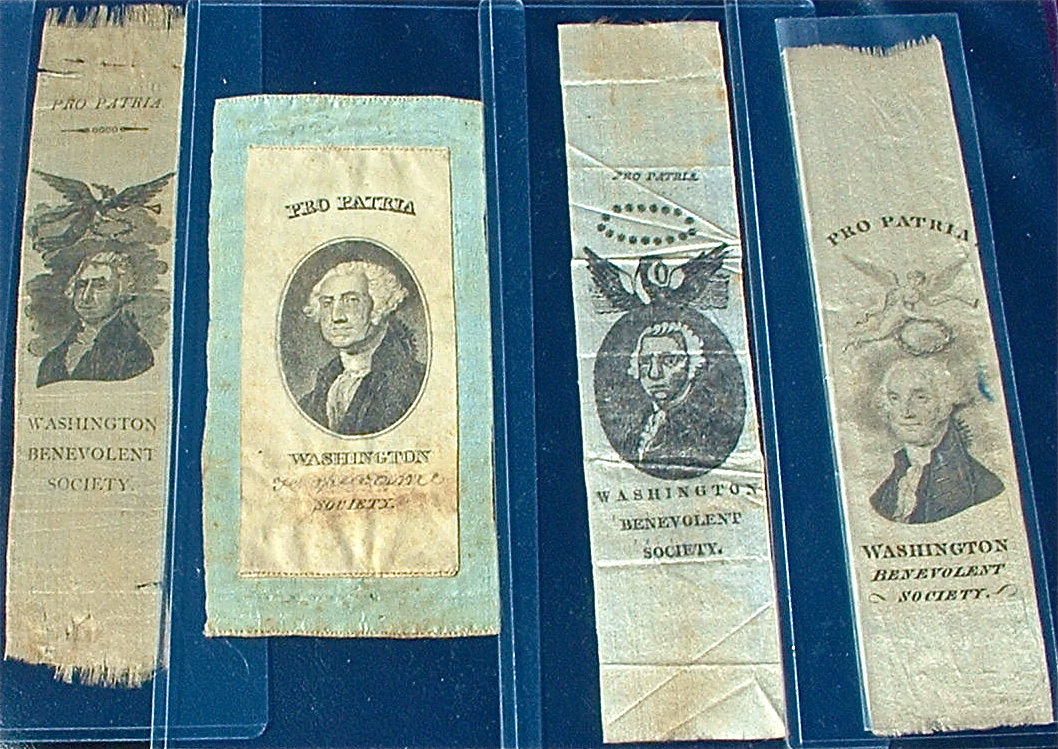
Ribbons

The Washington Benevolent Societies (the "WBS") were grass-roots political clubs set up from 1808 to 1816 by the Federalist Party in the U.S. to electioneer for votes. The first branch of the organization was set up in New York City, in opposition to the older Tammany Society. An early membership certificate of group indicates that this branch was "instituted in the City of New York, on the 12th day of July, 1808." The President of that first WBS was Isaac Sebring (perhaps the Federalist merchant described in "The Old Merchants of New York City) and Secretary was Guilian C. Verplanck. The New York branch of the society met at Washington Hall.

Societies were also formed in Rhode Island in 1810, as the threat of warfare loomed.

In a July 6, 1812 edition of the "Federalist" newspaper in New Jersey, it is reported that: "Coinciding with the first state peace convention, the initial public appearance of the Washington Benevolent Society in New Jersey occurred in Trenton on July 4, 1812." The WBS helped pioneer electioneering techniques in a democracy. "The promise of participation in the parade and receipt of the badge of the Society had been used as part of the Trenton Society's membership drive, for the Federalists were interested in gaining as many members as possible." Ribbon badges with George Washington's portrait and the words "Pro Patria" ("For Country") printed on silk or vellum were issued to members of the Societies. "Silk ribbons bearing Washington's portrait issued by the society are among the earliest mass-produced partisan objects in American political history." In addition, members of the group were often given printed with copies of "Washington's Farewell Address".

Into the Age of Jackson, an oration on Washington's Birthday, February 22, was commonly delivered before the Washington Benevolent Societies in various states, and sometimes it would be printed.

== Secondary scholarly sources ==
- Harlan H. Ballard, "A forgotten fraternity," Collections of the Berkshire Historical and Scientific Society 3 (1900) pp 279–98.
- David Hackett Fischer. The Revolution of American Conservatism: The Federalist Party in the Era of Jeffersonian Democracy (1976) ISBN 0-226-25135-7
