= Gilbert Eastman =

American actor and playwright (1934–2006)

- Born: September 12, 1934; Middletown, Connecticut, U.S.
- Died: December 2, 2006 (aged 72)
- Occupations: Educator; actor; playwright; author; television host

Gilbert Eastman (September 12, 1934 – December 2, 2006) was an American educator, actor, playwright, author, and television host. He acted in American Sign Language (ASL) plays and wrote many of them. Eastman taught and performed at the National Theatre of the Deaf (NTD), while writing and performing in many of their plays. In 1993, he won an Emmy Award for co-hosting the show Deaf Mosaic.

== Personal life ==
Gilbert Eastman was born in Middletown, Connecticut, on September 12, 1934. Eastman attended the American School for the Deaf in Hartford, Connecticut. After graduating from there in 1952, he attended Gallaudet University, receiving a bachelor's degree in art in 1957. After Eastman graduated from Gallaudet University, he married a deaf actress named June Russi. He graduated from the Catholic University of America in Washington, D.C., with a master's degree in drama, with him being the first deaf person to receive that degree. In 1967, 1968, and 1971, Eastman studied during the summer with the National Theatre of the Deaf (NTD). He received an honorary doctorate in 2002 from Gallaudet University. Eastman died from cancer on December 2, 2006.

== Career ==
=== Teaching and media ===
Eastman was invited by David Hays to instruct a non-verbal communication class at the NTD during the summer. Due to Hays not assigning an interpreter, Eastman created Visual Gestural Communication (VGC). VGC is a form of communication in which people who are deaf use "universal gestures, facial expressions, body language, and pantomime to communicate." He taught in Gallaudet's College Drama Department from 1957 to 1969 and was its chairman since 1963. Eastman wrote about VGC in the 1989 book From Mime to Sign. He wrote a biography about Laurent Clerc, the first deaf person to teach in the United States. Eastman wrote What in 1982, followed by Aladdin and His Magic Lamp in 1983. He began co-hosting the Gallaudet University news program Deaf Mosaic during the late 1980s and he won an Emmy Award for the show in 1993.

=== Actor and playwright ===
Eastman had a role in multiple American Sign Language (ASL) plays by the Gallaudet Dramatics Club and the D.C. Club for the Deaf, including the plays Macbeth, Charley's Aunt, and The Hairy Ape. He was in the play All the Way Home, with the National School of the Deaf, on NBC Experiment in Television in 1967. Along with other NTD actors, Eastman had roles in Hamlet, The Tale of Kasane, and Gianni Schicchi. He was the stage manager for many plays and directed over 40 plays in multiple genres. His 1972 ASL version of the play Antigone was performed at the John F. Kennedy Center for the Performing Arts in 1973. In that same year, Eastman wrote an ASL combination play of My Fair Lady and Pygmalion titled Sign Me Alice. He wrote a sequel to Sign Me Alice. In 1995, he performed for deaf and hearing children at the Rochester Senior Center in Rochester, New York, with an interpreter.
