= National Theatre of the Deaf =

American theatre company

- Abbreviation: NTD
- Founded: 1967; 59 years ago
- Headquarters: West Hartford, Connecticut, U.S.
- Coordinates: 41.7712702°N 72.7473777°W
- Board Chair: Tyrone Giordano
- Website: ntd.org

The National Theatre of the Deaf (NTD) is an American theatre company founded in 1967 and based in Connecticut, United States.

The company presents productions that combine American Sign Language and spoken language to make performances accessible to both deaf and hearing audiences. NTD is affiliated with a drama school founded in 1967 and with the Little Theatre of the Deaf (LTD), established in 1968 for younger audiences.

Before the NTD’s founding, there were no college-level theatre programs designed for deaf actors. The three major deaf theatre groups active earlier were the New York Association of the Deaf, the New York Theatre Guild of the Deaf, and the Metropolitan Theatre Guild of the Deaf.

NTD’s first official performance was The Man With His Heart in the Highlands at Wesleyan University in 1967. Company members participated in the first National and Worldwide Deaf Theatre Conference in 1994. The NTD has received awards including the Tony Award for Theatrical Excellence. The group has toured all 50 states and more than 30 countries.

== Founding ==
In 1946, Robert Panara, a graduate of Gallaudet University and teacher at the New York School for the Deaf, produced a play with his student Bernard Bragg, then 17 years old. When both later taught and studied at Gallaudet, they developed the concept of a national theatre for the deaf.

In 1963, Dr. Edna Levine, a professor of deaf studies at New York University, saw Bragg perform a one-man show in New York City and discussed creating a dedicated theatre for the deaf with him. In 1965, they secured a federal grant from the U.S. Department of Health, Education, and Welfare, with further support from the Office of Education, to establish the NTD. Mary E. Switzer, Boyce R. Williams, and Malcolm Norwood of the Rehabilitation Services Administration supported the project.

Levine and Bragg collaborated with set designer David Hays, a Harvard graduate and Broadway designer, to define the organization’s goals, funding, and location. Other contributors included Anne Bancroft, Arthur Penn, and Gene Lasko, who had worked together on The Miracle Worker.

== Mission and location ==
The founders’ stated mission was to present sign language on stage for both deaf and hearing audiences, using a mix of sign language and spoken word. Productions have featured both deaf and hearing performers, with deaf actors using sign, mime, and gesture, and hearing actors providing spoken dialogue. Bragg’s training with the French mime Marcel Marceau influenced early NTD productions.

The NTD was first located at the Eugene O'Neill Theatre Center in Waterford, Connecticut. In 1983 it moved to Chester, Connecticut, then to Hartford, Connecticut in 2000, and later to the American School for the Deaf in West Hartford in 2004. Since 2012, it has operated again from the O'Neill Theatre Center while maintaining an office at the American School for the Deaf.

According to testimony from Executive Director Betty Beekman before the Connecticut Appropriations Committee in March 2015, the organization’s mission includes presenting theatre that integrates American Sign Language and spoken English.

== Actors, instructors, and curriculum ==
The founding company included:

- Violet Armstrong
- Bernard Bragg
- Charles Corey
- Gilbert Eastman
- Lou Fant
- Ed Fearon
- Joyce Flynn Lasko
- Phyllis Frelich
- Dorothy Miles
- Mary Beth Miller
- Audree Norton
- Howard Palmer
- Will Rhys
- June Russi
- Tim Scanlon
- Morton Steinberg
- Andrew Vasnick
- Joe Velez
- Ralph White

Early instructors included Bernard Bragg, Eric Malzkuhn, Bob Panara, Sahome Tachibana, Gina Blau, William Rhys, and George C. White III.

The school’s curriculum covered acting, mime, movement, stagecraft, lighting, costuming, theatre history, dance, and physical performance skills such as tumbling and fencing.

=== Notable actors ===
Phyllis Frelich received the Tony Award for Best Actress in a Play in 1980 for Children of a Lesser God. Linda Bove became known for her role on Sesame Street. Former NTD member Troy Kotsur, who performed with the company from 1991 to 1993, won the Academy Award for Best Supporting Actor for CODA and credited deaf theatre organizations for supporting his career. Other actors who have appeared with NTD include Colleen Dewhurst, Sir Michael Redgrave, Chita Rivera, Jason Robards, and Meryl Streep. NTD actress Jane Norman later taught at Gallaudet University and contributed to deaf media studies.

== Productions, touring, and reception ==
Company members and students rehearsed and toured extensively in the United States and abroad, often traveling by bus and staying in shared accommodations. They performed works by both hearing and deaf playwrights.

Reactions to NTD productions have varied. Hearing audiences have generally responded positively, while some deaf and hard of hearing viewers have expressed mixed views—some feeling that productions leaned toward hearing audiences, while others appreciated their accessibility and visibility.

The NTD has been featured in publications such as Silent News, the Puppetry Journal, and on the television program Deaf Mosaic during the 1980s and 1990s.

Year(s)	Show Title
1967–1968	The Man With His Heart in the Highlands
1967–1968	The Tale of Kasane
1967–1968	Tyger! Tyger! And other Burnings
1967–1968	Gianni Schicchi
1967–1968	On the Harmfulness of Tobacco
1968–1969	The Critic
1968–1969	Camera 3 (LTD)
1968–1969	The Love of Don Perlimoplin and Belissa in the Garden
1968–1969	Blueprints
1969–1970	Under Milkwood
1969–1970	Sganagelle
1970–1971	Woyzeck
1970–1971	Journeys
1971–1972	My Third Eye
1972–1973	Gilgamesh
1973–1974	Optimism (or) The Misadventures of Candide
1973–1974	A Child's Christmas in Wales
1974–1975	The Dybbuk
1974–1975	Priscilla, Princess of Power
1975–1976	Parade
1976–1977	Four Saints in Three Acts
1976–1977	On the Harmfulness of Tobacco
1977–1978	The Three Musketeers
1977–1978	Sir Gawain and the Green Knight
1977–1978	Who Knows One
1978–1979	Volpone
1978–1979	Quite Early One Morning
1979–1980	Our Town
1979–1980	Four Thurber Tales (LTD)
1979–1980	The Wooden Boy
1980–1981	The Iliad: Play by Play
1980–1981	Silken Tent
1981–1982	The Ghost of Chastity Past
1981–1982	Gilgamesh
1981–1982	Issa's Treasure
1981–1982	The Road to Cordoba
1982–1983	Parzival, from the Horse's Mouth
1982–1983	Big Blue Marble (LTD)
1983–1984	The Hero with a Thousand Faces
1984–1985	All the Way Home
1984–1985	A Christmas Carol
1984–1985	A Child's Christmas in Wales
1985–1986	In a Grove
1985–1986	Race a Comet, Catch a Tale (LTD)
1985–1986	Farewell, My Lovely!
1986–1987	The Heart is a Lonely Hunter
1986–1987	The Gift of the Magi
1987–1988	The Dybbuk
1987–1988	A Child's Christmas in Wales
1987–1988	The Light Princess
1988–1989	King of Hearts
1989–1990	The Odyssey
1990–1991	One More Spring
1990–1991	Collaborates with Pilobolus
1991–1992	Treasure Island
1992–1993	Ophelia
1992–1993	Sports (LTD)
1993–1994	Under Milkwood
1993–1994	The Wonderful "O" (LTD)
1994–1996	Italian Straw Hat
1996–1997	Curiouser & Curioser
1997–1998	Peer Gynt
1997–1998	World of Whys (LTD)
2020–2021	Deafenstein

== Bibliography ==
- Cosh, Jackie. "Model lessons in a theatre for the deaf." The Times Educational Supplement Scotland 2274 (2012): 20.
- Hays, David. "The National Theatre of the Deaf." Deaf, The National Theatre of the. New York: The National Theatre of the Deaf (1969)
- Powers, Helen. "The National Theatre of the Deaf." (2021)
- Wells, Cortney. "A Decade of Deaf Theatre: An analysis of theatre within the Deaf Community, the expansion of its acceptance, and the influence it has today." (2016).
