= James M. Nack =

American poet (1809–1879)

- Born: January 4, 1809; New York City, United States
- Died: September 23, 1879 (aged 70)
- Education: Collegiate School (New York City), New York Institution for the Instruction of the Deaf and Dumb
- Occupation: deaf American poet
- Known for: maybe the first book published in the United States by a deaf man
- Notable work: The Legend of the Rocks, And Other Poems
- Spouse: Martha W. Simon (m. 1838)
- Children: daughters

James M. Nack (January 4, 1809 – September 23, 1879) was a deaf American poet.

== Biography ==
In 1809, Nack was born in New York City to a poor family. Unable to afford school, Nack was taught by his sister and attended The Collegiate School (New York City) through the Dutch Reformed Church. Nack started reading at age four and was starting to write poetry at age 8. At age nine, Nack experienced a traumatic brain injury falling down a flight of stairs. After several weeks in a coma, Nack woke and was deaf. Later Nack lost his speech as well.

Despite his disabilities, Nack continued to write. At age 12, he authored a play.

Nack attended the New York Institution for the Instruction of the Deaf and Dumb in Manhattan from 1818 until 1823. One of Nack's poems, The Blue-Eyed Maid, got the attention of Abraham Asten, clerk of the city and county of New York. Asten gave Nack a job in the clerk's office where James became an assistant. Nack was able to spend long periods of time reading in Asten's personal library.

In 1827, Nack published The Legend of the Rocks, And Other Poems, the first of several volumes of poetry. This may have been the first book published in the United States by a deaf man. During this time, Nack also contributed poems to the New York Mirror.

Nack wrote mainly about family life and his daughters. He also wrote translations in French, German, and Dutch.

Nack married Martha W. Simon in 1838.

== Principal works ==
- The Legend of the Rocks, And Other Poems 1827
- An Ode on the Proclamation of President Jackson 1833
- Earl Rupert and Other Tales and Poems 1839
- The Immortal: A Dramatic Romance and Other Poems 1850
- The Romance of the Ring and Other Poems 1859
