= Audree Norton =

American actress

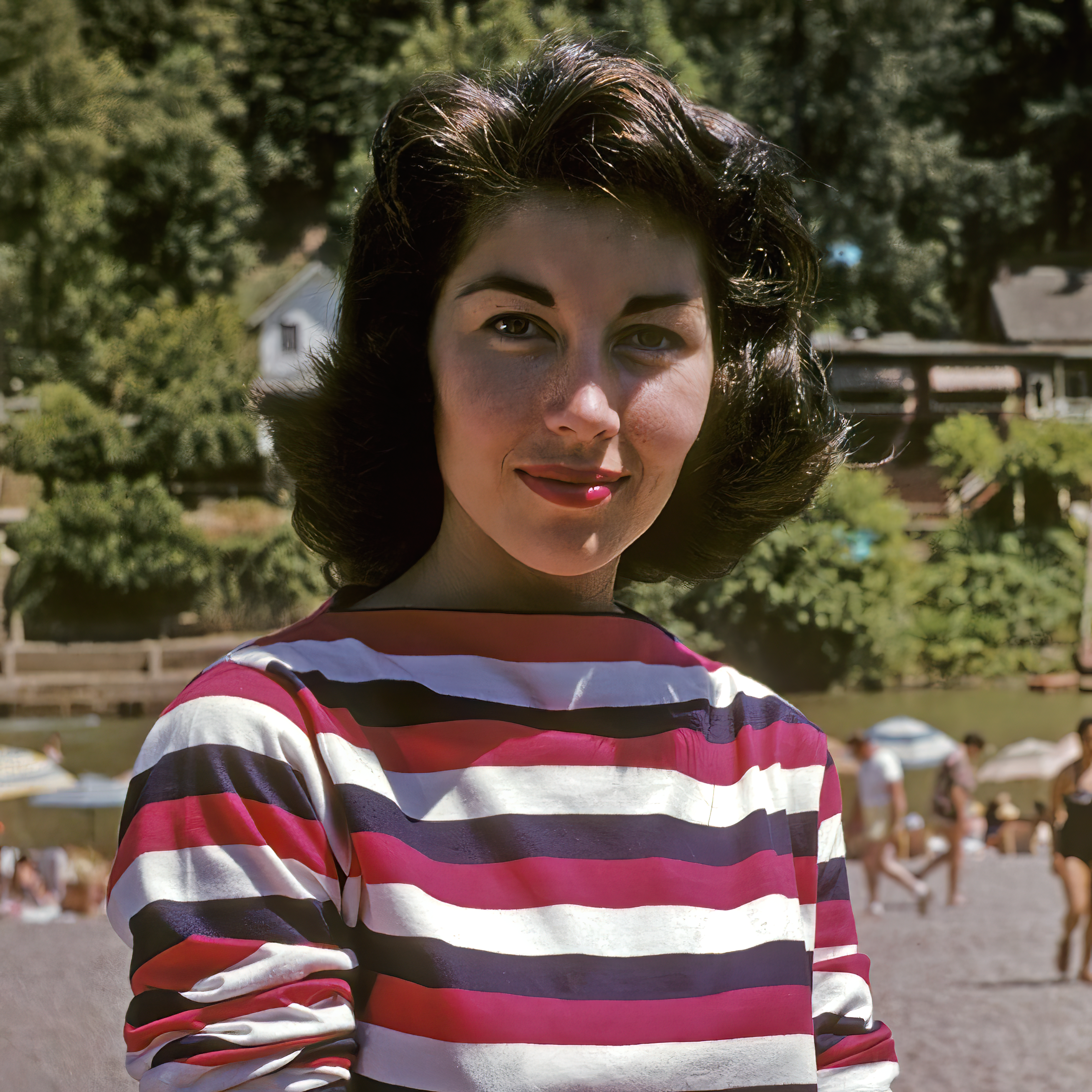
- Born: January 13, 1927; Great Falls, Montana
- Died: April 22, 2015 (aged 88); Fremont, California
- Education: Gallaudet University; California State University, East Bay
- Occupation: Actress

Audree Lauraine Norton (January 13, 1927 – April 22, 2015) was a deaf actress and educator.

== Biography ==
Audrey Norton was born in Great Falls, Montana to Lauraine (née Greenman) and Joseph Bennett. At three years old she became deaf from spinal meningitis. Two years later her parents divorced and soon after she and her mother moved to St. Paul, Minnesota. Her mother enrolled her at the W. Roby Allen School in Faribault, Minnesota. The Allen School used the oralism method that taught speech and lip reading and did not permit the use of sign language. Audree's mother learned that if Audree was to attend Gallaudet College (now university) she would have to attend the Minnesota State Academy for the Deaf (MSAD) that was located across the street from the Allen School. Once at MSAD Audree flourished finally able to use sign language. A 1952 graduate of Gallaudet University, she was one of the founding members of the National Theatre of the Deaf. In 1974, she was the first Deaf person to earn a master's degree in Rhetoric from California State University, East Bay.

She performed one of Elizabeth Barrett Browning's poems to music on the television series An Experiment in Television. She also performed in episodes of Family Affair, The Man and the City, Mannix and The Streets of San Francisco. In 1967, she was the first deaf actor to have a photograph featured in Time magazine.

In 1978, she was the center of a controversy towards Deaf actors and actresses. Norton auditioned to appear in an ABC Afterschool Special titled Mom and Dad Can't Hear Me, but was told by the casting director that she could not have the part because he would rather have people who can speak. Norton complained to the Screen Actors Guild, which launched protests by deaf people in the United States. After this incident, Norton never performed on television again.

She was the lead actress for the Kodak TV commercial "Memories", which was directed by Stuart Hagmann. It won a Clio Award for Best Commercial of the Year (1974).

In 2012, Norton received an honorary doctorate of humane letters from Gallaudet University.

In 2015, Norton died in Fremont, California.

Audree and Kenneth Norton were married for sixty-three years and had three children: Nikki Rexroat (Gary), Kurt Norton, and Dane Norton; two grandchildren: Tessa Bailey (née Rexroat) Paine (Justin) and Travis Alexander Norton Rexroat (Sophia Pellicoro); and two great-grandsons: Wesley Draper Paine and William Bennett Paine.

== Filmography ==
- NBC Experiment in Television (1967) (National Theater of the Deaf)
- Mannix (1968) (Jody Wellman) (The Silent Cry)
- Family Affair (1970) (Dr. Robinson) (The Language of Love)
- The Man and the City (1971) (Ann Larrabee) (Hands of Love)
- The Streets of San Francisco (1975) (Deaf Witness, uncredited) (Web of Lies)
