= Fort Gansevoort =

Former US Army fort

- New York City borough of Manhattan, New York, between Gansevoort Street and West 12th Street
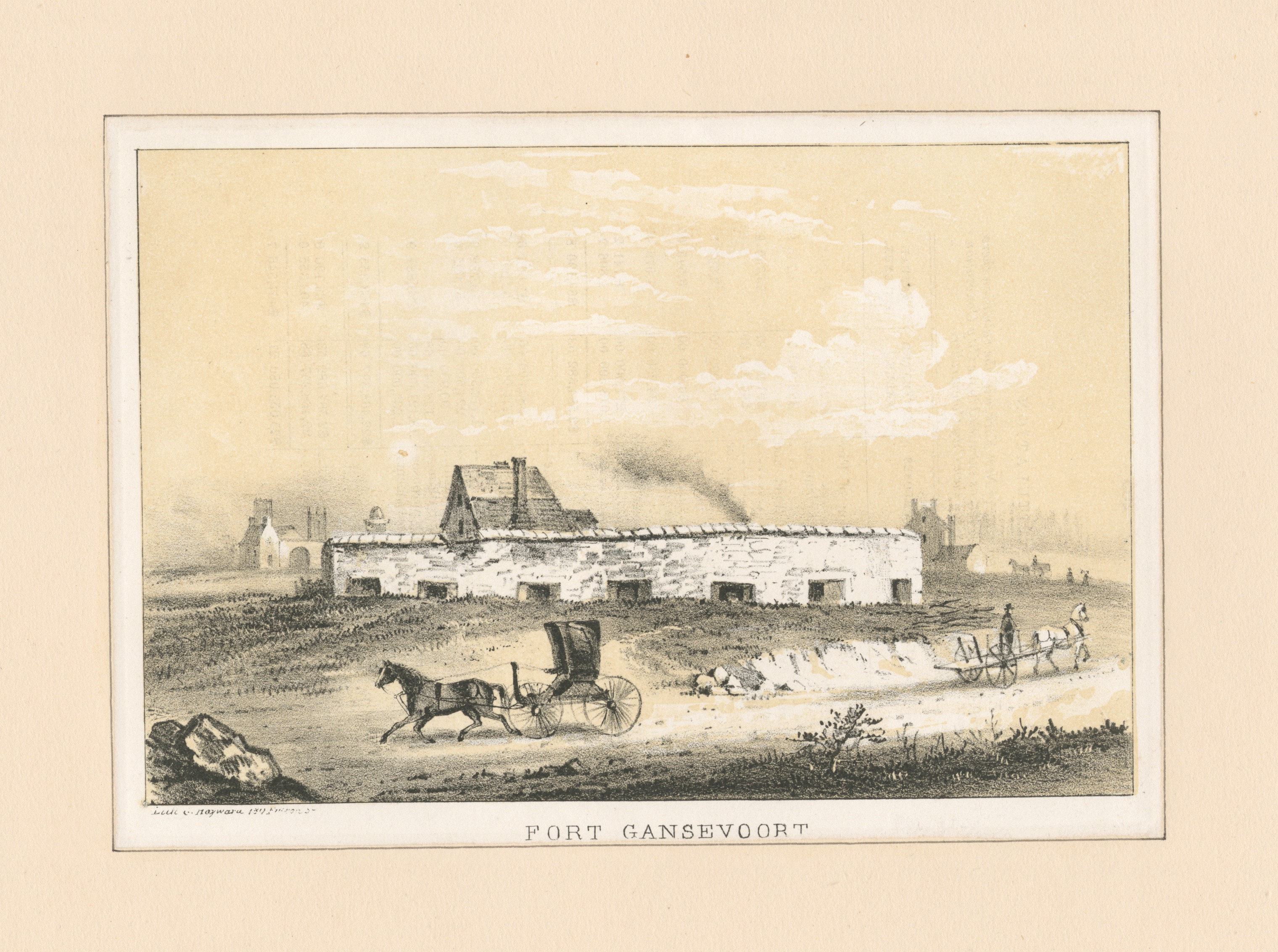
- Fort Gansevoort

Location
- Coordinates: 40°44′23″N 74°00′32″W

Site history
- Built: 1812
- Built by: United States Army Corps of Engineers
- In use: 1812–1849
- Materials: red sandstone
- Fate: demolished 1854
- Battles/wars: War of 1812

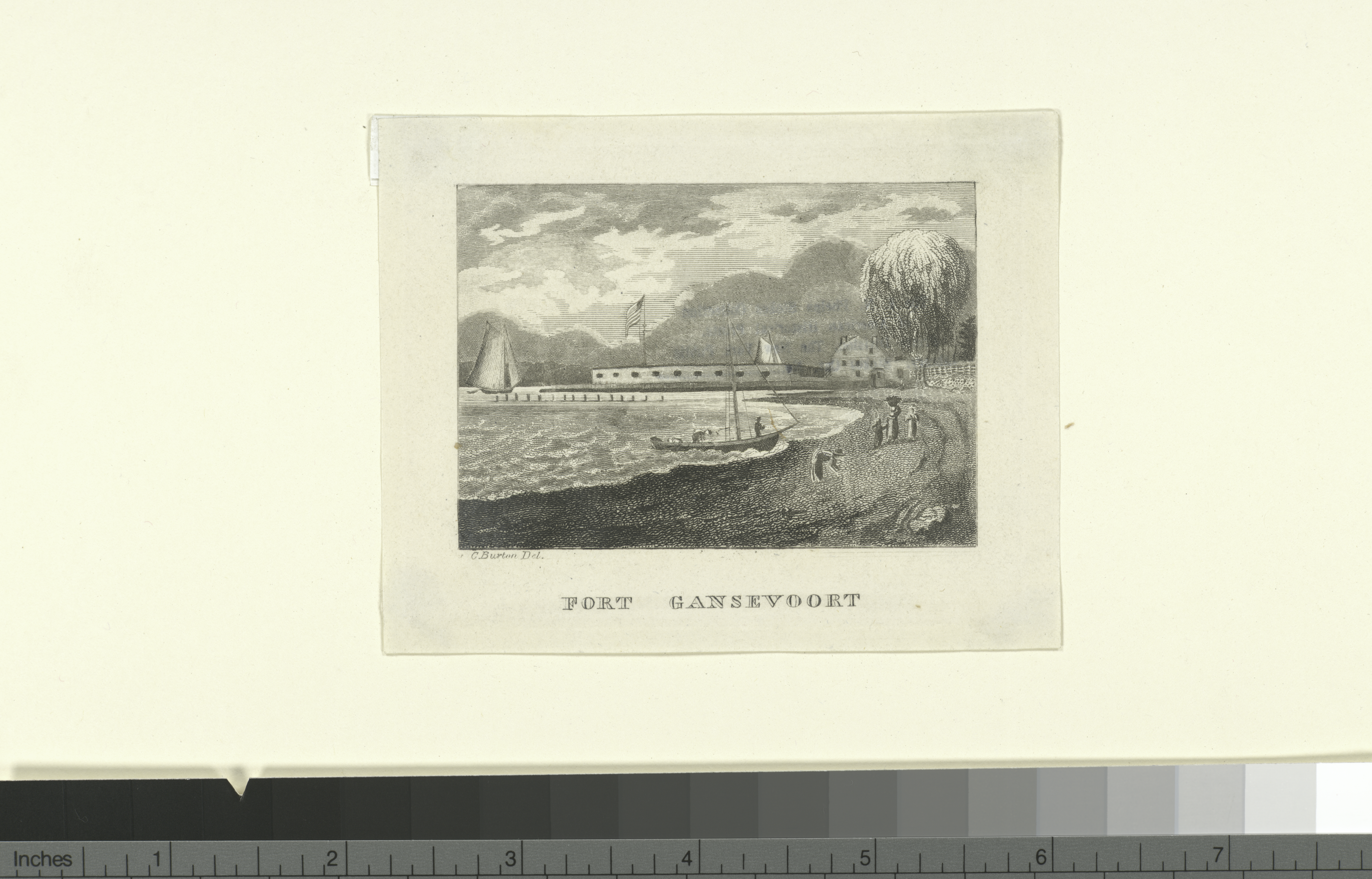

Fort Gansevoort is a former United States Army fort in the New York City borough of Manhattan. It was also known as the White Fort due to its whitewashed exterior.

== History ==
The fort was named for Peter Gansevoort, a Revolutionary War officer. It was located between Gansevoort Street and West 12th Street, near the west end of Gansevoort Street, strategically positioned to defend the Hudson River. The fort was completed in 1812, shortly after the outbreak of the War of 1812, and mounted 22 guns, along with a shot furnace, magazine, arsenal, and barracks. Some sources state that construction began in 1808; however, the fort does not appear in the Secretary of War's report on fortifications for December 1811. Forts built with state or local resources did not appear in these reports. The fort was part of what was later called the second system of US fortifications.

In support of the fort, North Battery, constructed similarly to Castle Clinton, was built on landfill in the Hudson River, and connected to Manhattan by a bridge at Canal Street.

Samuel Akerly served as Post Surgeon for the fort.

Fort Gansevoort did not see action, as New York City was not attacked in that war. It was demolished in either 1849 or 1854 (references vary). It was on the site of a previous weapons development center, where George Bomford developed the first columbiad cannon.

== See also ==
- Seacoast defense in the United States
