= New York School for the Deaf =

Location
- Greenburgh, New York; United States; 41.0523°N 73.7974°W

Information
- Type: Private non-profit organization
- Established: 1817; 209 years ago
- Founder: Reverend John Standford
- Faculty: 110
- Grades: Preschool-12
- Enrollment: 143
- Colors: Blue and gold
- Athletics: Soccer, volleyball, basketball, cheerleading, and track
- Athletics conference: Eastern Schools for the Deaf Athletic Association & City Schools Sports Association Westchester
- Mascot: Tornadoes
- Website: Official NYSD website

The New York School for the Deaf is a private school for the deaf in Greenburgh, New York, in Westchester County just north of New York City, United States. It is private non-profit tax-exempt organization under article 501(c)(3) of U.S. law.

== History ==
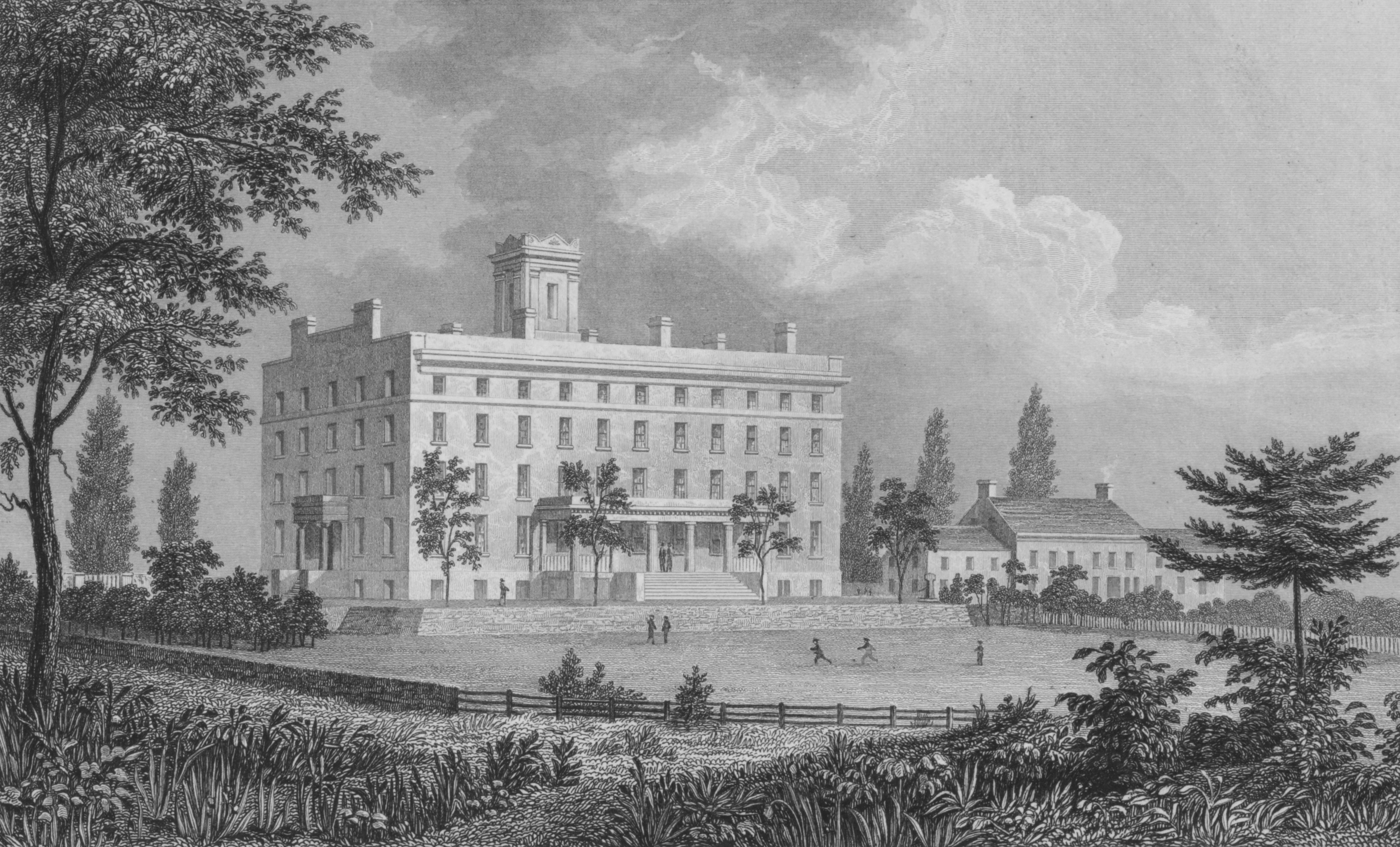
New York Institution for the Instruction of the Deaf and Dumb, 1835

The school had its origins in 1808, when the Rev. John Stanford gathered a small group of deaf children to teach them the alphabet and basic language skills in New York City. The New York School for the Deaf was chartered in 1817 as the New York Institution for the Instruction of the Deaf and Dumb. It held its first classes in New York City in 1818, just after the American School for the Deaf, and thus is recognized as the second oldest permanent deaf school in the United States. The first African American deaf student to be educated in the United States, Horace Crawford, enrolled at the school in 1818.

In 1829 it would move uptown to 49th Street and Madison Avenue. In 1856, this location would be sold to Columbia College (now Columbia University) and served as the site of Columbia's Madison Avenue campus. After the 1857 move, it would move to Upper Manhattan to an area then known as Carmansville. In 1892, the school was the first U.S. school of any kind to introduce a military curriculum. For six decades, tight formation drill was an everyday occurrence on the parade grounds.

It changed its name to the New York School for the Deaf in 1933 and moved to its current and final location in Greenburgh, New York in 1938, where it remains. In 1952, the school dropped the military curriculum and welcomed girls again, and since then has expanded its programs to benefit both deaf and hard-of-hearing school children, and more recently, pre-school classes as well.

== Education ==
Since 1977, Fanwood uses the total communication method of deaf education, which employs multiple means of communication including sign language and other modes, as necessary for each child.

=== Technology ===
TTY phones and closed caption TVs were used starting in the 1970s. More recently the school has introduced video phones, interactive whiteboards and computer assisted learning.

== Distinguished alumni, faculty, trustees and visitors ==
- Samuel Akerly - faculty and later co-founder of New York Institute of the Blind
- Frederick Augustus Porter Barnard - deaf American scientist and educator, later president of Columbia University
- Bernard Bragg - deaf performer, writer, director, poet, and artist
- De Witt Clinton - first president of the board of trustees (1817-1818)
- Helen Keller - visited the school as a teenager in 1893, chaperoned by her friend Alexander Graham Bell
- James Milnor - third president of the board of trustees (1829)
- Samuel Mitchell - second president of the board of trustees (1818-1829)
- Samuel Morse - trustee (1861-1863)
- James M. Nack - deaf poet
- Harvey Prindle Peet - headed the school for 36 years
- Andrew Leete Stone - professor, Civil War chaplain, writer, pastor
